= HP Pavilion dv2000 series =

Laptop model series by HP

HP Pavilion dv2000
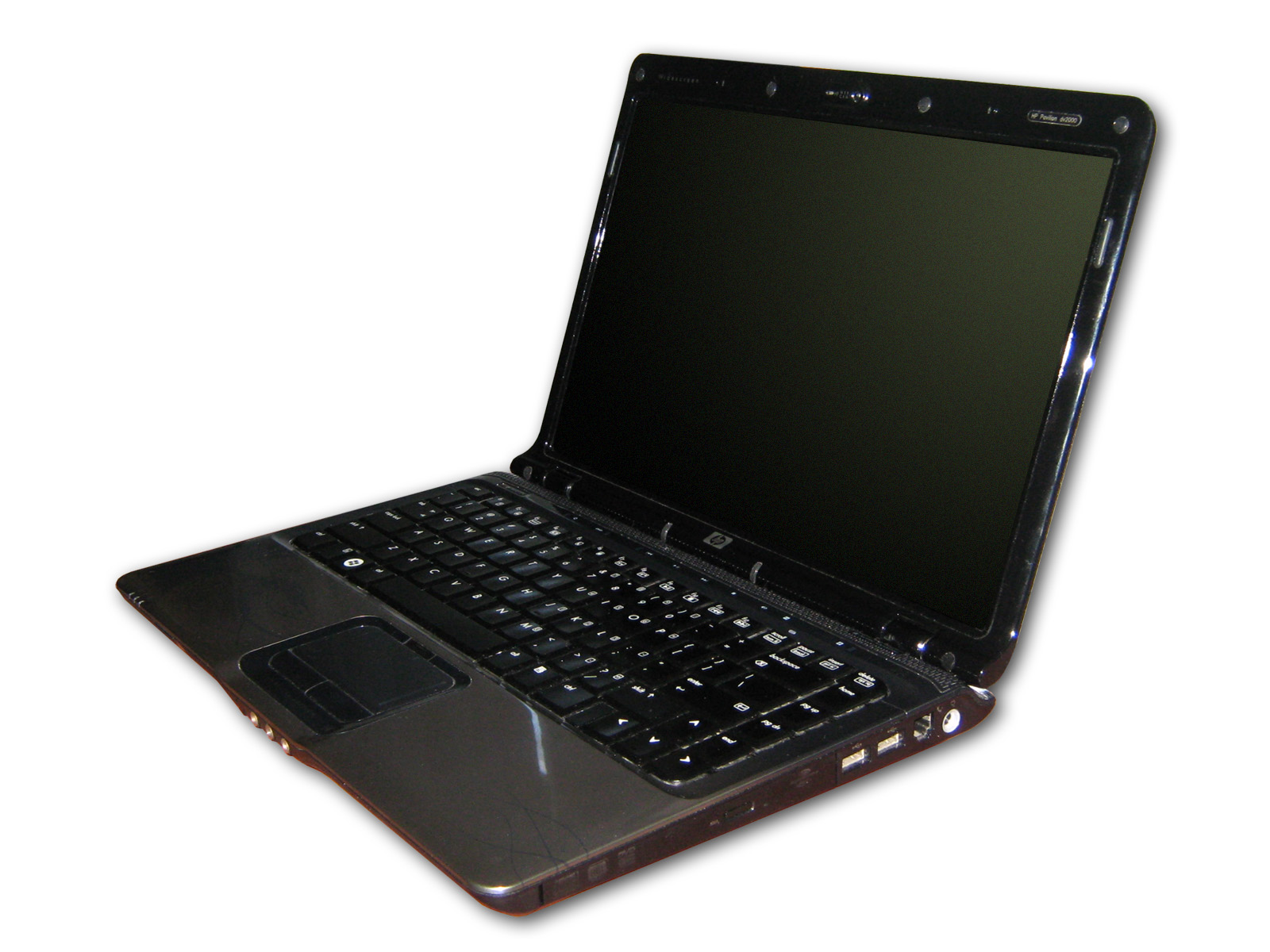
- Pavilion dv2500se
- Developer: Hewlett-Packard (HP Inc.)
- Manufacturer: Quanta Computer Inc.; Wistron
- Type: Laptop
- Released: May 9, 2006; 20 years ago
- Lifespan: 2006–2008
- Discontinued: September 2008; 18 years ago
- Display: 14.1"
- Predecessor: dv1000
- Successor: dv4
- Related: dv9000, dv6000

The HP Pavilion dv2000 was a model series of laptops manufactured by Hewlett-Packard Company from 2006 to 2008 that featured 16:10 14.1" diagonal displays. It was produced concurrently with the dv6000 and dv9000 series, featuring 15.4" and 17.0" displays respectively.

The dv2000 series was replaced by the 14.1" dv4 series in mid-to-late September 2008. Sales of the dv2000 series stopped around that time alongside the related dv6000 and dv9000 series as they were being replaced with the dv4, dv5 and dv7 series, with the remaining stock of laptops being cleared out afterwards.

== Models ==
=== Overall model list ===
Note: non-exhaustive list

- dv2000t - uses Intel processors
- dv2000z - uses AMD processors
- dv2200la (North-Latin America) - uses an Intel Core duo-core processor
- dv2322la (Latin America) - uses an Intel Pentium dual-core processor
- dv24xx - uses AMD processors (DV2410, DV2412, DV2416, DV2419, DV2420)
- dv24xxca - uses an Intel Celeron M processor (dv2402ca)
- dv2500t - uses Intel processors
- dv2500z - uses AMD processors
- dv2500bw (Broadband Wireless Series) - includes a built-in WWAN card
- dv2500se (Special Edition) - features the Verve Imprint finish
- dv2700t - uses Intel processors
- dv2700z - uses AMD processors
- dv2700bw (Broadband Wireless Series) - includes a built-in WWAN card
- dv2700se (Special Edition) - features the Verve Imprint finish
- dv2890nr (Artist Edition) - features the Artist Edition Imprint finish

Note: Models with AMD processors were never sold in CTO configurations; only pre-configured models were available for those with AMD processors.

==== Model number suffixes ====
The two- or three-letter suffix on the model number indicates special information like country or language (dv----xx). The following chart describes each suffix.

- t: Intel processor
- z: AMD processor
- ae: Artist Edition ("Artist Edition" imprint)
- bw: Broadband Wireless series
- se: Special Edition ("Special Edition" imprint)

The following suffixes corresponds to the region where the notebook is sold.

- us: United States
- ca: Canada
- la: Latin America
- br: Brazil
- ea / ee / [e + other letter]: Europe / Middle East
- eo / so / no: Scandinavia
- ec / sc / nc: Czech Republic and Slovakia
- au / ax: Asia / Australia - AMD processor (AU = AMD + UMA graphics; AX = AMD + discrete graphics)
- tu / tx: Asia / Australia - Intel processor (TU = Intel + UMA; TX = Intel + discrete)
- ap: Asia Pacific

Other suffixes include:

- nr: no rebate
- cl: club model, only available through discount shopping clubs such as Costco and Sam's Club
- wm: Walmart model
- dx: Best Buy model
- od: Office Depot model
- st: Staples model

=== Pavilion dv2000 ===
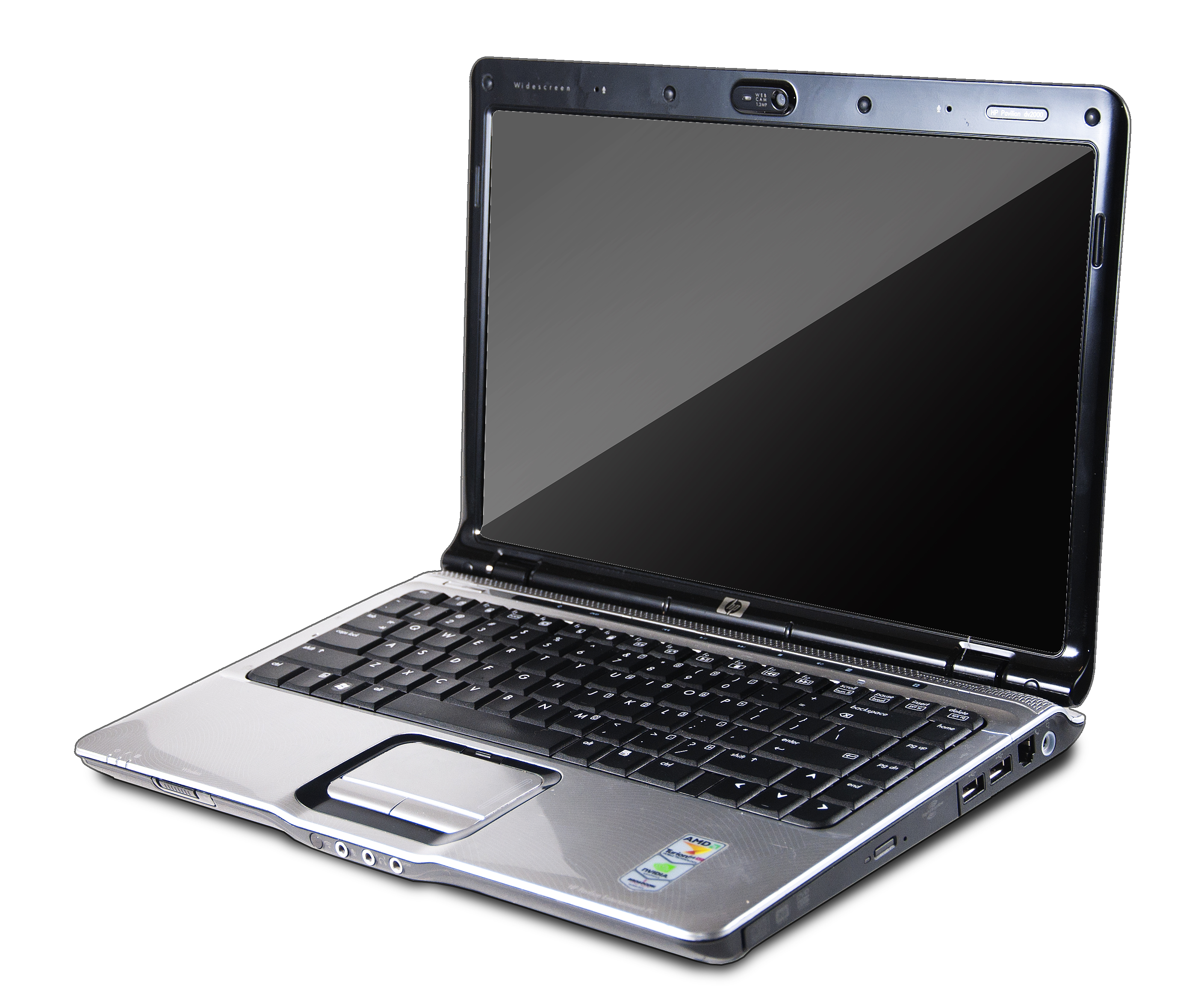
HP Pavilion dv2000 series

First model in the Pavilion dv2000 series, released in 2006. The dv2000t sub-brand uses Intel CPUs, generally Intel Core Solo, Core Duo and Celeron, while the dv2000z uses AMD CPUs, generally AMD Turion and Sempron. Both models came with either integrated or discrete graphics. It uses the Wave pattern as part of HP's Imprint finish.

Model numbers range from dv2000 to dv2499.

=== Pavilion dv2500 ===
Second model in the Pavilion dv2000 series, released in 2007. The dv2500t sub-brand uses Intel CPUs, generally Intel Core 2 Duo, while the dv2500z uses AMD CPUs, generally AMD Athlon, Turion and Sempron. Both models came with either integrated or discrete graphics. It uses the Radiance pattern as part of HP's Imprint finish, with some models featuring other unique patterns.

Model numbers range from dv2500 to dv2699.

==== Pavilion dv2620us ====
Model released in October 2007.

===== Specifications =====
- Processor: Tyler-class (65 nm) Turion 64 X2 TL-58 1.9 GHz
  - Front side bus: HyperTransport (800 MHz / 1600 MT/s)
- Graphics: NVIDIA GeForce 7150M (up to 256 MB maximum)
- Display: 14.1" 16:10 aspect ratio WXGA (1280 x 800) High-Definition "HP BrightView" LCD
- Video output: S-video, VGA (resolution depends on graphics display adapter)
- Speakers: Integrated Altec Lansing stereo speakers
- Audio output: analog and digital. Features two separate audio outputs: one 3.5 mm stereo, and one S/PDIF optical.
- Chipset: nForce 630M MCP67M/MCP67D
- BIOS: Phoenix BIOS
- Memory: 4 GB maximum, 2 slots DDR2, 1.8 volt unbuffered, asymmetric or interleaved operation supported
- Storage: 1 internal SATA drive bay, accepts 2.5 inch hard disk drives and solid state drives
- Optical drive: LightScribe SuperMulti 8X DVD±RW and 24X CD-RW combo drive with double layer support
- Battery: 6 cell Li-Ion (2.20 Ah/2.55 Ah) or optional 12 cell Li-Ion (2.20 Ah)
- Network: Marvell E8039 Ethernet 10/100BT integrated network interface; high speed 56K modem
- Wireless: Broadcom 4321AGN Wi-Fi Adapter (with Bluetooth)
  - It also has an option for mobile broadband from the Verizon Wireless V740 ExpressCard
- Media: Microphone, 1.3-megapixel webcam (HP WebCam)
- Security: Kensington lock
- I/O ports: 3 USB 2.0, IEEE 1394 FireWire, PCI expansion port 3 (proprietary bus for docking port), ExpressCard/54, Integrated Consumer IR (remote control receiver), 5-in-1 digital media card reader, microphone in, RJ-11 (modem), RJ-45 (LAN), VGA, TV out (S-video). External SATA (eSATA) is not supported.
- HP Imprint design: Radiance imprint finish
- Operating system: Windows Vista Home Premium (32-bit)
- Dimensions (inches): 13.15 length x 9.33 width x 1.54 maximum closed height
- Weight: approximately 5.29 lb (2.40 kg)
- Accessories: remote control, 65 watt AC power adapter
  - Dock/base: The HP xb3000 Notebook Expansion Base was designed for use with this system. It uses the proprietary PCI expansion port 3 docking station port. The HP Notebook QuickDock is also available for this laptop, connected via the same docking station port.

=== Pavilion dv2700 ===
This was the third and final model in the Pavilion dv2000 series, released in late 2007 and generally available in 2008. The dv2700t sub-brand uses Intel CPUs, generally Intel Core 2 Duo, while the dv2700z uses AMD CPUs, generally AMD Athlon, Turion and Sempron. Both models came with either integrated or discrete graphics. It uses the Radiance pattern as part of HP's Imprint finish, with some models featuring other unique patterns.

Model numbers range from dv2700 to dv2899.

==== Weight and dimensions ====
NOTE: Weight varies by configuration.

	dv2800tae	dv2700tse	dv2700t
Weight (with standard battery)	5.59 lb (2.54 kg)	5.29 lb (2.40 kg)	5.29 lb (2.40 kg)
Width (left to right)	13.15 in.	13.15 in.	13.15 in.
Depth (front to back)	9.33 in.	9.33 in.	9.33 in.
Height (max) (thickness)	1.54 in.	1.54 in.	1.54 in.
Height (min) (thickness)	1.02 in.	1.02 in.	1.02 in.

==== Customizable features ====
The following are customizable features only available in the United States (HP CTO notebooks).

Color	dv2800tae	dv2700tse	dv2700t
Radiance			✓
Verve		✓	
Artist Edition	✓		
Operating system	dv2800tae	dv2700tse	dv2700t
Windows Vista Home Basic 32-bit			
Windows Vista Home Premium 32-bit	✓	✓	✓
Windows Vista Home Premium 64-bit			✓
Windows Vista Business 32-bit			✓
Windows Vista Ultimate 64-bit	✓	✓	✓
Processors (Intel)	dv2800tae	dv2700tse	dv2700t
Intel Pentium Dual-Core mobile processor			
T2390 (1.86 GHz, 1 MB L2 cache, 533 MHz FSB)			✓
Intel Core 2 Duo processor			
T5750 (2.0 GHz, 2 MB L2 cache, 667 MHz FSB)	✓	✓	✓
T5850 (2.16 GHz, 2 MB L2 cache, 667 MHz FSB)	✓	✓	✓
T8100 (2.10 GHz, 3 MB L2 cache, 800 MHz FSB)	✓	✓	
T8300 (2.40 GHz, 3 MB L2 cache, 800 MHz FSB)	✓	✓	
T9300 (2.50 GHz, 6 MB L2 cache, 800 MHz FSB)	✓	✓	
Display	dv2800tae	dv2700tse	dv2700t
14.1" WXGA high-definition HP BrightView widescreen display (1280 × 800)	✓	✓	✓
Memory	dv2800tae	dv2700tse	dv2700t
1 GB DDR2 system memory (2 DIMM)			✓
2 GB DDR2 system memory (2 DIMM)	✓	✓	✓
3 GB DDR2 system memory (2 DIMM)	✓	✓	✓
4 GB DDR2 system memory (2 DIMM)	✓	✓	✓
Graphics card	dv2800tae	dv2700tse	dv2700t
Intel GMA X3100		✓	✓
128 MB NVIDIA GeForce 8400M GS	✓	✓	✓
Personalization	dv2800tae	dv2700tse	dv2700t
Webcam only	✓	✓	✓
Webcam + fingerprint reader		✓	✓
Networking	dv2800tae	dv2700tse	dv2700t
Intel PRO/wireless 3945ABG network connection	✗	✓	✓
Intel PRO/wireless 4965AGN network connection		✓	✓
Intel PRO/wireless 4965AGN network connection and Bluetooth	✓	✓	✓
Broadband wireless	dv2800tae	dv2700tse	dv2700t
Verizon wireless V740 ExpressCard (service activation required)	✓	✓	✓
Hard drive	dv2800tae	dv2700tse	dv2700t
120 GB 5400 rpm SATA hard drive	✓	✓	✓
160 GB 5400 rpm SATA hard drive	✓	✓	✓
250 GB 5400 rpm SATA hard drive	✓	✓	✓
320 GB 5400 rpm SATA hard drive	✓	✓	✓
Primary CD/DVD drive	dv2800tae	dv2700tse	dv2700t
SuperMulti 8× DVD+/-R/RW with double layer support	✓	✓	✓
LightScribe SuperMulti 8× DVD+/-RW with double layer support	✓	✓	✓
Blu-ray ROM with SuperMulti DVD+/-R/RW double layer	✓	✓	✓
TV & entertainment experience	dv2800tae	dv2700tse	dv2700t
HP ExpressCard digital/analog TV tuner	✓	✓	✓
Primary battery	dv2800tae	dv2700tse	dv2700t
6-cell lithium-ion battery		✓	✓
High-capacity 6-cell lithium-ion battery	✓	✓	✓
12-cell lithium-ion battery	✓	✓	✓

== Manufacturing ==
Quanta Computer Inc. and Wistron, which are original design manufacturers (ODM), manufacturer the hardware, motherboard, and design of the dv2000 series of laptops alongside the dv6000 and dv9000 series (as well as other HP laptops made by HP at the time). Quanta and Wistron have also manufactured their equivalent Compaq Presario-branded models, which were different in design but using similar hardware. This was a common practice by many other brands of the era.

== Hardware issues ==
HP has identified hardware issues with certain HP Pavilion dv2000/dv6000/dv9000 and Compaq Presario V3000/V6000 series notebook PCs equipped with Nvidia chipsets, most of them with AMD microprocessors. For the dv2000 series, this includes many models from the dv20xx, dv21xx, dv22xx, dv23xx, dv24xx, dv25xx, dv26xx, dv27xx, and the dv28xx series (where xx is any other 2 digits). Many of these issues were caused by overheating, a common problem with many of these HP laptops of this timeframe (as well as other manufacturers).

Some symptoms include:

- Missing wireless connections (no wireless networks detected by the laptop and the wireless adapter is absent from Device Manager)
- Video card or graphics chipset failures (no video from either the display or an external monitor)
- Sound system, optical drive and/or hard drive problems

The Nvidia graphics chips in certain dv2000 series models are also prone to GPU failures caused by overheating or long-term regular use, commonly referred to as "bumpgate". This was a major problem for various other manufacturers of the era. Some users have recommended a resoldering of the Nvidia GPUs on the motherboard due to the aforementioned issues causing the solder of the GPUs to liquify.

The Intel-based dv2000 series with Core Solo, Core Duo, Core 2 Duo or Pentium Dual Core processors and Intel 945 chipsets are mostly resistant from the above issues, except for those with dedicated Nvidia video chips.
