= HP Pavilion dv9000 series =

Laptop model series by HP

HP Pavilion dv9000
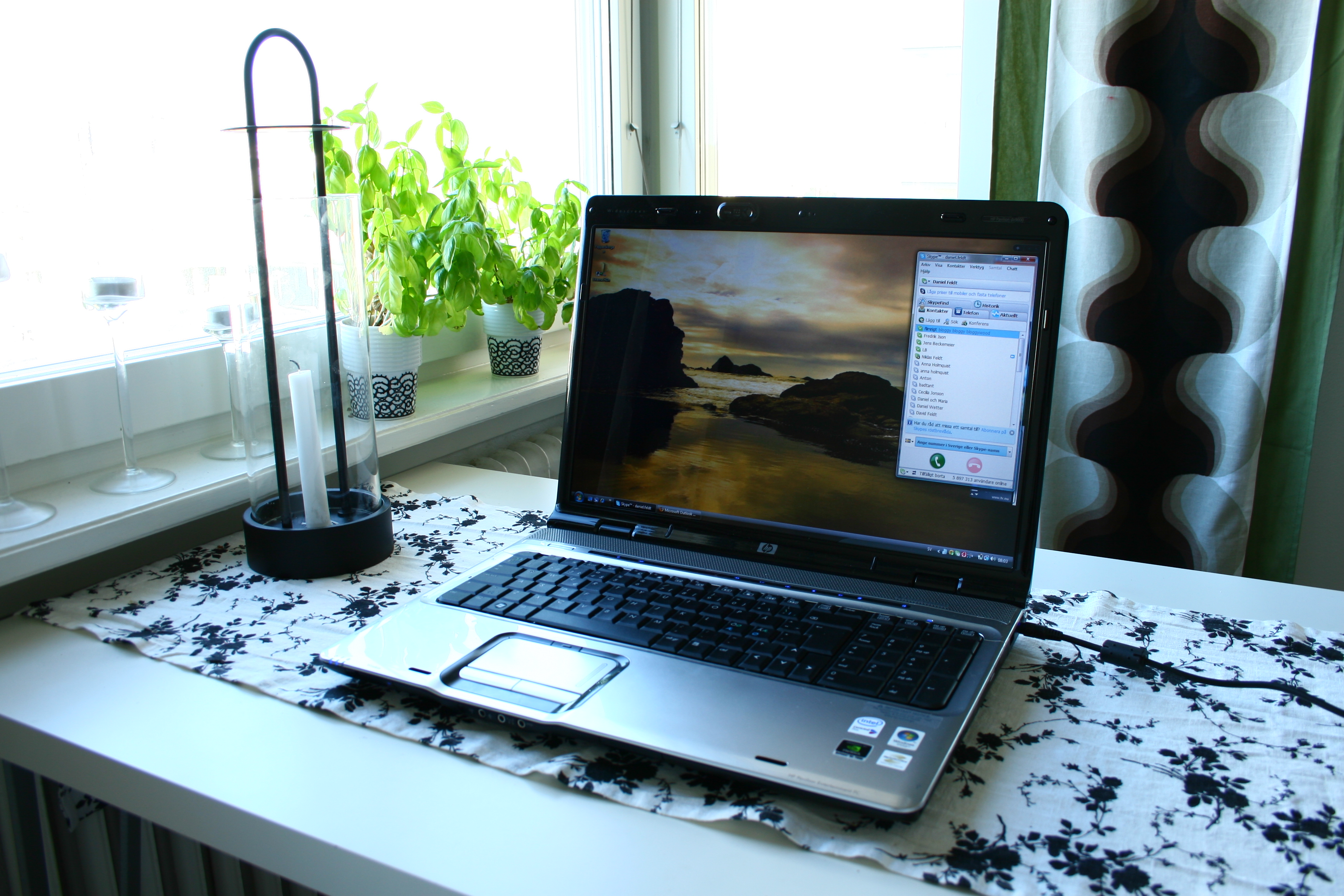
- HP Pavilion dv9380
- Developer: Hewlett-Packard (HP Inc.)
- Manufacturer: Quanta Computer Inc.
- Type: Laptop
- Released: July 12, 2006; 20 years ago
- Lifespan: 2006–2008
- Discontinued: September 2008; 18 years ago
- Display: 17.0"
- Predecessor: dv8000
- Successor: dv7
- Related: dv6000, dv2000

The HP Pavilion dv9000 was a model series of laptops manufactured by Hewlett-Packard Company from 2006 to 2008 that featured 16:10 17.0" diagonal displays. It was produced concurrently with the dv2000 and dv6000 series, featuring 14.1" and 15.4" displays respectively.

The dv9000 series (as well as other 17"+ laptops from other manufacturers) are also notable for having dual SATA 2.5" hard disk drive expansion bays, which can be used in a RAID configuration, if supported. (Note: The dv9000 series of laptops do not support RAID configurations at all due to them being typically preinstalled with "Home" versions of Windows, which cannot support creation of striped or spanned volumes (also known as "dynamic disks") in the Disk Management tool. However, some laptops also came with professional or business-oriented versions of Windows, which can support software RAID configurations via the creation of striped or spanned volumes (or "dynamic disks").) By default, however, most models of this series of laptops only came with one hard drive installed, and the user must purchase an additional hard drive kit if they want to add a secondary hard drive to the system. However, there are some laptops that contained two hard drives built-in, which are typically those preconfigured by the user.

The closest competitor to the dv9000 series was the Dell XPS M1530, which was a 15.4" laptop released around the same time as the dv9700 series in November 2007 and had similar features.

The dv9000 series was succeeded by the larger 17.3" dv7 series in July 2008. Sales of the dv9000 series stopped in mid-to-late September 2008 alongside the related dv2000 and dv6000 series as they were being replaced with the dv4, dv5 and dv7 series, with the remaining stock of laptops being cleared out afterwards.

== Overview ==
First introduced in July 2006, the HP Pavilion dv9000 series was a series of high-definition capable widescreen laptops using the HP Imprint finish. It features a 17.0" 16:10 liquid crystal display (LCD) in a clamshell-type case, measuring 15.16 x 11.65 x 1.57 inches and weighing at about 7.7 lb (3.5 kg) to 8.4 lb (3.8 kg). Specific internal components can be custom-chosen by the customer as build-to-order configurations or pre-selected by the manufacturer for the retail market.

Unique to this model series (as well as many other laptops in the HP Pavilion laptop line at the time) was HP QuickPlay, which allows the user to view multimedia content without booting into the operating system. On models preinstalled with Windows Vista, the QuickPlay boot option was removed due to compatibility issues, but the main features are still available as a separate application from within Windows.

== Models ==
=== Pavilion dv9000 ===
The Pavilion dv9000 is the first model of the Pavilion dv9000 series of laptops, introduced in 2006. Two models released within the dv9000 model series were the dv9000t and dv9000z, differing with their options of processors and graphics hardware as well as their feature sets. The dv9000t series featured Intel processors with Intel chipsets while the dv9000z series featured AMD processors and Nvidia nForce chipsets. All models from this series came preinstalled with either Windows XP or Windows Vista depending on the time of manufacture.

Model numbers for the dv9000 series range from dv9000 to dv9499.

==== Pavilion dv9000t ====
Model introduced in September 2006. Uses Intel CPUs and an Intel Calistoga 945PM motherboard.

===== Specifications =====
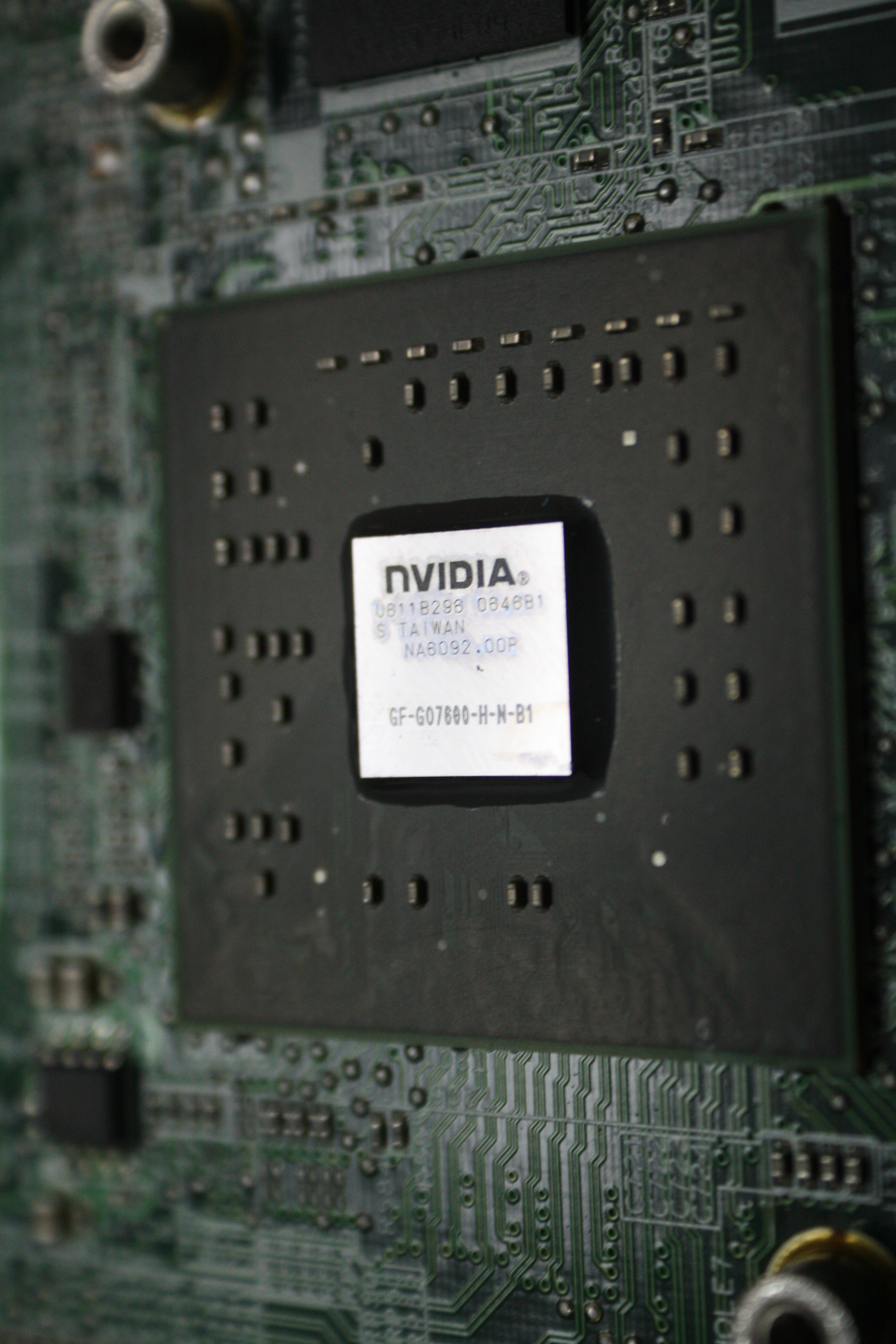
An Nvidia GeForce Go 7600 graphics chip soldered onto the motherboard of an HP Pavilion dv9000 series laptop

- Processor: Merom-class (65nm) T2080 1.7 GHz, T2350 1.8 GHz, T5600 1.8 GHz, T7200 2.0 GHz
  - Front side bus: 533 MHz to 667 MHz (dependent on processor model)
- Graphics: Nvidia GeForce Go 7600 (256 MB or 512 MB)
- Display: 17.0" 16:10 aspect ratio WXGA (1440 x 900) or WSXGA+ (1680 x 1050) high-definition "HP BrightView" LCD
  - WXGA+ panels came in either a single or dual lamp configuration; WSXGA+ panels only came in a single lamp configuration.
- Video output: HDMI 1080p, S-video, VGA (resolution depends on graphics display adapter)
- Speakers: integrated Altec Lansing stereo speakers
- Audio output: analog and digital. Early models had three separate audio outputs: one 3.5 mm stereo, one S/PDIF optical and one HDMI. Later models only have two outputs: one 3.5 mm stereo and one HDMI, with the S/PDIF optical jack being replaced with a secondary stereo jack. The HP product documentation alludes to this change.
- Chipset: Intel Calistoga 945PM featuring I/O Controller Hub 7 (ICH7) southbridge
- BIOS: Phoenix BIOS
  - RAID support: no support for hardware RAID configurations. RAID configurations only supported in software via dynamic disks (AKA striped or spanned volumes; not supported in "Home" editions of Windows)
- Memory: 2 GB maximum, 2 slots DDR2, 1.8 volt unbuffered, asymmetric or interleaved operation supported
- Storage: 2 internal SATA 2.5" drive bays, supports compatible hard disk drives (and solid state drives)
  - Two hard drives can be used in a RAID configuration, usually in software, by a supported operating system. RAID support (either hardware or software) is not required to use a secondary hard drive. Alternatively, both drives can be used as separate individual drives.
  - Supports up to 320 GB of hard drive storage using dual 160 GB hard drives in a software RAID configuration
- Optical drive: LightScribe SuperMulti 8X DVD±RW and 24X CD-RW combo drive with double layer support
  - Optional HD DVD optical drives are available.
- Battery: 8-cell li-ion (2.2 Ah)
- Network: Ethernet 10/100/1000 integrated network interface; high-speed 56k modem
- Wireless: Intel PRO/Wireless 3945ABG (with or without Bluetooth)
  - Optional integrated Bluetooth and mobile broadband via the Verizon Wireless V740 ExpressCard are available.
- Media: microphone, 1.3-megapixel webcam (HP WebCam)
- Security: Kensington lock, fingerprint reader
- I/O ports: 4 USB 2.0 (3 on models with fingerprint reader), IEEE 1394 FireWire, PCI expansion port 3 (proprietary bus for docking port), ExpressCard/54, Integrated Consumer IR (remote control receiver), 5-in-1 digital media card reader, microphone in, RJ-11 (modem), RJ-45 (LAN), VGA, TV out (S-video), HDMI. External SATA (eSATA) is not supported.
- HP imprint design: Wave imprint finish
- Operating system(s): Windows XP Home Edition SP2, Windows XP Professional SP2, Windows XP Media Center Edition 2005 (optional), Windows Vista Home Basic (32-bit), Windows Vista Home Premium (32-bit), Windows Vista Business (32-bit; optional), Windows Vista Ultimate (64-bit; optional)
- Dimensions (inches): 15.16 length x 11.65 width x 1.57 maximum closed height
- Weight: approximately 7.7 lb (3.5 kg) to 8.2 lb (3.7 kg)
- Accessories: remote control, 90 watt AC power adapter
  - Dock/base: Supports the HP xb3000 docking station, connected via the proprietary PCI expansion port 3. The HP Notebook QuickDock port replicator using the same port connection is also available.

==== Pavilion dv9000z ====
Model introduced in July 2006. Uses AMD CPUs and an nForce 430M C51M/C51D motherboard.

===== Specifications =====
- Processor: Richmond-class (90 nm) Turion 64 MK-36 2.0 GHz, Tyler-class (65 nm) Athlon 64 X2 TK-53 1.7 GHz, TK-55 1.86 GHz; Turion 64 X2 TL-56 1.8 GHz, TL-58 1.9 GHz, TL-60 2.0 GHz, TL-62 2.1 GHz, TL-64 2.2 GHz
  - Front side bus: HyperTransport (800 MHz / 1600 MT/s)
- Graphics: Nvidia GeForce Go 6150 or Nvidia GeForce Go 7600 (256 MB)
- Display: 17.0" 16:10 aspect ratio WXGA (1440 x 900) or WSXGA+ (1680 x 1050) high-definition "HP BrightView" LCD
  - WXGA+ panels came in either a single or dual lamp configuration; WSXGA+ panels only came in a single lamp configuration.
- Video output: HDMI 1080p (only on some models), S-video, VGA (resolution depends on graphics display adapter)
- Speakers: integrated Altec Lansing stereo speakers
- Audio output: analog and digital. Early models had three separate audio outputs: one 3.5 mm stereo, one S/PDIF optical and one HDMI (on some models). Later models only have two outputs: one 3.5 mm stereo and one HDMI (on some models), with the S/PDIF optical jack being replaced with a secondary stereo jack. The HP product documentation alludes to this change.
- Chipset: nForce 430M C51M/C51D
- BIOS: Phoenix BIOS
  - RAID support: No support for hardware RAID configurations. RAID configurations only supported in software via dynamic disks (AKA striped or spanned volumes; not supported in "Home" editions of Windows)
- Memory: 2 GB or 4 GB maximum, 2 slots DDR2, 1.8 volt unbuffered, asymmetric or interleaved operation supported
- Storage: 2 internal SATA 2.5" drive bays, supports compatible hard disk drives (and solid state drives)
  - Two hard drives can be used in a RAID configuration, usually in software, by a supported operating system. RAID support (either hardware or software) is not required to use a secondary hard drive. Alternatively, both drives can be used as separate individual drives.
  - Supports up to 320 GB of hard drive storage using dual 160 GB hard drives in a software RAID configuration
- Optical drive: LightScribe SuperMulti 8X DVD±RW and 24X CD-RW combo drive with double layer support
  - Optional HD DVD optical drives are available.
- Battery: 8-cell li-ion (17.6 Ah) or high-capacity 8-cell li-ion (20.4 Ah)
- Network: Ethernet 10/100BT integrated network interface; high-speed 56k modem
- Wireless: Broadcom 802.11b/g WLAN, 802.11a/b/g WLAN and Bluetooth, 802.11a/b/g/n (draft 802.11n) WLAN, 802.11 pre-n WLAN and Bluetooth
  - Optional integrated Bluetooth and mobile broadband via the Verizon Wireless V740 ExpressCard are available.
- Media: Microphone, 1.3-megapixel webcam (HP WebCam)
- Security: Kensington lock, fingerprint reader
- I/O ports: 4 USB 2.0 (3 on models with fingerprint reader), IEEE 1394 FireWire, PCI expansion port 3 (proprietary bus for docking port), ExpressCard/54, Integrated Consumer IR (remote control receiver), 5-in-1 digital media card reader, microphone in, RJ-11 (modem), RJ-45 (LAN), VGA, TV out (S-video). External SATA (eSATA) is not supported.
- HP imprint design: Wave imprint finish
- Operating system(s): Windows XP Home Edition SP2, Windows XP Professional SP2, Windows XP Media Center Edition 2005 (optional), Windows Vista Home Basic (32-bit), Windows Vista Home Premium (32-bit), Windows Vista Business (32-bit; optional), Windows Vista Ultimate (64-bit; optional)
- Dimensions (inches): 15.16 length x 11.65 width x 1.57 maximum closed height
- Weight: approximately 7.8 lb (3.5 kg) to 8.4 lb (3.8 kg)
- Accessories: remote control, 90 watt AC power adapter
  - Dock/base: Supports the HP xb3000 docking station, connected via the proprietary PCI expansion port 3. The HP Notebook QuickDock port replicator using the same port connection is also available.

=== Pavilion dv9200 ===
The Pavilion dv9200 is a variation of the Pavilion dv9000 series of laptops, which became generally available in 2007. It is based on the dv9000t model series, exclusively using Intel Core/Core 2 Duo CPUs with discrete Nvidia graphics in most models of this series. All models of the dv9000 series came preinstalled with Windows Vista from this model series onwards.

Other models within the dv92xx-dv94xx range were also available with AMD processors and Nvidia nForce chipsets.

==== Specifications ====
- Processor: Merom-class (65nm) T5200 1.6 GHz, T5500 1.6 GHz, T2250 1.7 GHz, T5300 1.7 GHz
  - Front side bus: 533 MHz to 667 MHz (dependent on processor model)
- Graphics: Nvidia GeForce Go 7600 (256 MB)
- Display: 17.0" 16:10 aspect ratio WXGA (1440 x 900) LCD
  - WXGA+ panels came in either a single or dual lamp configuration; WSXGA+ panels only came in a single lamp configuration.
- Video output: HDMI 1080p, S-video, VGA (resolution depends on graphics display adapter)
- Speakers: integrated Altec Lansing stereo speakers
- Audio output: analog and digital. Early models had three separate audio outputs: one 3.5 mm stereo, one S/PDIF optical and one HDMI. Later models only have two outputs: one 3.5 mm stereo and one HDMI, with the S/PDIF optical jack being replaced with a secondary stereo jack. The HP product documentation alludes to this change.
- Chipset: Intel Calistoga 945PM featuring I/O Controller Hub 7 (ICH7) southbridge
- BIOS: Phoenix BIOS
  - RAID support: No support for hardware RAID configurations. RAID configurations only supported in software via dynamic disks (AKA striped or spanned volumes; not supported in "Home" editions of Windows)
- Memory: 2 GB maximum, 2 slots DDR2, 1.8 volt unbuffered, asymmetric or interleaved operation supported
- Storage: 2 internal SATA 2.5" drive bays, supports compatible hard disk drives (and solid state drives)
  - Two hard drives can be used in a RAID configuration, usually in software, by a supported operating system. RAID support (either hardware or software) is not required to use a secondary hard drive. Alternatively, both drives can be used as separate individual drives.
  - Supports up to 320 GB of hard drive storage using dual 160 GB hard drives in a software RAID configuration
- Optical drive: LightScribe SuperMulti 8X DVD±RW and 24X CD-RW combo drive with double layer support
- Battery: 8-cell li-ion (2.2 Ah)
- Network: Ethernet 10/100/1000 integrated network interface; high-speed 56k modem
- Wireless: Intel PRO/Wireless 3945ABG (with or without Bluetooth)
  - Optional integrated Bluetooth and mobile broadband via the Verizon Wireless V740 ExpressCard are available.
- Media: microphone, 1.3-megapixel webcam (HP WebCam)
- Security: Kensington lock, fingerprint reader
- I/O ports: 4 USB 2.0 (3 on models with fingerprint reader), IEEE 1394 FireWire, PCI expansion port 3 (proprietary bus for docking port), ExpressCard/54, Integrated Consumer IR (remote control receiver), 5-in-1 digital media card reader, microphone in, RJ-11 (modem), RJ-45 (LAN), VGA, TV out (S-video), HDMI. External SATA (eSATA) is not supported.
- HP imprint design: Wave imprint finish
- Operating system(s): Windows Vista Home Premium (32-bit/64-bit), Windows Vista Business (32-bit; optional), Windows Vista Ultimate (64-bit; optional)
- Dimensions (inches): 15.16 length x 11.65 width x 1.57 maximum closed height
- Weight: approximately 7.7 lb (3.5 kg) to 8.2 lb (3.7 kg)
- Accessories: remote control, 90 watt AC power adapter
  - Dock/base: Supports the HP xb3000 docking station, connected via the proprietary PCI expansion port 3. The HP Notebook QuickDock port replicator using the same port connection is also available.

=== Pavilion dv9500 ===
The Pavilion dv9500 is a variation of the Pavilion dv9000 series of laptops, which was introduced as early as May 2007. It succeeds the prior Pavilion dv9000 model series. Two models released within the dv9500 model series were the dv9500t and dv9500z, differing with their options of processors and graphics hardware as well as their feature sets. The dv9500t series featured Intel processors with Intel chipsets while the dv9500z series featured AMD processors and Nvidia nForce chipsets.

Model numbers for the dv9500 series range from dv9500 to dv9699.

==== Pavilion dv9500t ====
Uses Intel CPUs and an Intel Crestline GM/PM965 motherboard.

===== Specifications =====
- Processor: Merom-class (65nm) T2300 1.6 GHz, T5250 1.5 GHz, T7100 1.8 GHz, T7300 2.0 GHz, T7500 2.2 GHz, T7700 2.4 GHz
  - Front side bus: 667 MHz to 800 MHz (dependent on processor model); The T2300 is limited to 533 MHz while the T5250 is limited to 667 MHz.
- Graphics: Intel GMA X3100 UMA, Nvidia GeForce 8400M GS (128 MB) or Nvidia GeForce 8600M GS (256 MB)
- Display: 17.0" 16:10 aspect ratio WXGA (1440 x 900) LCD
  - WXGA+ panels came in either a single or dual lamp configuration; WSXGA+ panels only came in a single lamp configuration.
- Video output: HDMI 1080p, S-video, VGA (resolution depends on graphics display adapter)
- Speakers: integrated Altec Lansing stereo speakers
- Audio output: analog and digital. Early models had three separate audio outputs: one 3.5 mm stereo, one S/PDIF optical and one HDMI. Later models only have two outputs: one 3.5 mm stereo and one HDMI, with the S/PDIF optical jack being replaced with a secondary stereo jack. The HP product documentation alludes to this change.
- Chipset: Intel Crestline PM965 or Intel Crestline GM965 featuring I/O Controller Hub 8 (ICH8) southbridge
- BIOS: Phoenix BIOS
  - RAID support: No support for hardware RAID configurations. RAID configurations only supported in software via dynamic disks (AKA striped or spanned volumes; not supported in "Home" editions of Windows)
- Memory: 4 GB maximum, 2 slots DDR2, 1.8 volt unbuffered, asymmetric or interleaved operation supported. Intel specifies that only 533 to 667 MHz memory clock speed is supported; but HP pre-sales telephone support has stated twice that the motherboard does support 533 to 800 MHz memory. The sales team does not differentiate between compatibility and utilization. 800 MHz DDR2 is being installed for orders that include 800 MHz-capable processors.
- Storage: 2 internal SATA 2.5" drive bays, supports compatible hard disk drives (and solid state drives)
  - Two hard drives can be used in a RAID configuration, usually in software, by a supported operating system. RAID support (either hardware or software) is not required to use a secondary hard drive. Alternatively, both drives can be used as separate individual drives.
  - Supports up to 500 GB of hard drive storage using dual 250 GB hard drives in a software RAID configuration
- Optical drive: LightScribe SuperMulti 8X DVD±RW and 24X CD-RW combo drive with double layer support
  - Optional HD DVD or Blu-ray optical drives are available.
- Battery: 8-cell li-ion (2.2 Ah)
- Network: Ethernet 10/100/1000 integrated network interface; high-speed 56k modem
- Wireless: Intel PRO/Wireless 4965AGN (with or without Bluetooth)
  - Optional integrated Bluetooth and mobile broadband via the Verizon Wireless V740 ExpressCard are available.
- Media: Microphone, 1.3-megapixel webcam (HP WebCam)
- Security: Kensington lock, fingerprint reader
- I/O ports: 4 USB 2.0 (3 on models with fingerprint reader), IEEE 1394 FireWire, PCI expansion port 3 (proprietary bus for docking port), ExpressCard/54, Integrated Consumer IR (remote control receiver), 5-in-1 digital media card reader, microphone in, RJ-11 (modem), RJ-45 (LAN), VGA, TV out (S-video), HDMI. External SATA (eSATA) is not supported.
- HP imprint design: Radiance imprint finish
- Operating system(s): Windows Vista Home Premium (32-bit/64-bit), Windows Vista Business (32-bit; optional), Windows Vista Ultimate (64-bit; optional)
- Dimensions (inches): 15.16 length x 11.65 width x 1.57 maximum closed height
- Weight: approximately 7.7 lb (3.5 kg) to 8.2 lb (3.7 kg)
- Accessories: remote control, 90 watt AC power adapter
  - Dock/base: Supports the HP xb3000 docking station, connected via the proprietary PCI expansion port 3. The HP Notebook QuickDock port replicator using the same port connection is also available.

==== Pavilion dv9500z ====
Uses AMD CPUs and an nForce 630M MCP67M/MCP67D motherboard.

===== Specifications =====
- Processor: Tyler-class (65 nm) Athlon 64 X2 TK-53 1.7 GHz, TK-55 1.86 GHz; Turion 64 X2 TL-56 1.8 GHz, TL-58 1.9 GHz, TL-60 2.0 GHz, TL-62 2.1 GHz, TL-64 2.2 GHz, TL-66 2.3 GHz, TL-68 2.4 GHz
  - Front side bus: HyperTransport (800 MHz / 1600 MT/s)
- Graphics: Nvidia GeForce 7150M or GeForce 8400M GS (128 MB)
- Display: 17.0" 16:10 aspect ratio WXGA (1440 x 900) LCD
  - WXGA+ panels came in either a single or dual lamp configuration; WSXGA+ panels only came in a single lamp configuration.
- Video output: HDMI 1080p (only on some models), S-video, VGA (resolution depends on graphics display adapter)
- Speakers: integrated Altec Lansing stereo speakers
- Audio output: analog and digital. Early models had three separate audio outputs: one 3.5 mm stereo, one S/PDIF optical and one HDMI (on some models). Later models only have two outputs: one 3.5 mm stereo and one HDMI (on some models), with the S/PDIF optical jack being replaced with a secondary stereo jack. The HP product documentation alludes to this change.
- Chipset: nForce 630M MCP67M/MCP67D
- BIOS: Phoenix BIOS
  - RAID support: No support for hardware RAID configurations. RAID configurations only supported in software via dynamic disks (AKA striped or spanned volumes; not supported in "Home" editions of Windows)
- Memory: 4 GB maximum, 2 slots DDR2, 1.8 volt unbuffered, asymmetric or interleaved operation supported
- Storage: 2 internal SATA 2.5" drive bays, supports compatible hard disk drives (and solid state drives)
  - Two hard drives can be used in a RAID configuration, usually in software, by a supported operating system. RAID support (either hardware or software) is not required to use a secondary hard drive. Alternatively, both drives can be used as separate individual drives.
  - Supports up to 500 GB of hard drive storage using dual 250 GB hard drives in a software RAID configuration
- Optical drive: LightScribe SuperMulti 8X DVD±RW and 24X CD-RW combo drive with double layer support
  - Optional HD DVD optical drives are available on some models.
- Battery: 8-cell li-ion (17.6 Ah) or high-capacity 8-cell li-ion (20.4 Ah)
- Network: Ethernet 10/100BT integrated network interface; high-speed 56k modem
- Wireless: Broadcom 4321AGN Wi-Fi adapter (with or without Bluetooth)
  - Optional integrated Bluetooth and mobile broadband via the Verizon Wireless V740 ExpressCard are available.
- Media: microphone, 1.3-megapixel webcam (HP WebCam)
- Security: Kensington lock, fingerprint reader
- I/O ports: 4 USB 2.0 (3 on models with fingerprint reader), IEEE 1394 FireWire, PCI expansion port 3 (proprietary bus for docking port), ExpressCard/54, Integrated Consumer IR (remote control receiver), 5-in-1 digital media card reader, microphone in, RJ-11 (modem), RJ-45 (LAN), VGA, TV out (S-video), HDMI (only on some models). External SATA (eSATA) is not supported.
- HP imprint design: Radiance imprint finish
- Operating system(s): Windows Vista Home Premium (32-bit/64-bit), Windows Vista Business (32-bit; optional), Windows Vista Ultimate (64-bit; optional)
- Dimensions (inches): 15.16 length x 11.65 width x 1.57 maximum closed height
- Weight: approximately 7.7 lb (3.5 kg) to 8.2 lb (3.7 kg)
- Accessories: remote control, 90 watt AC power adapter
  - Dock/base: Supports the HP xb3000 docking station, connected via the proprietary PCI expansion port 3. The HP Notebook QuickDock port replicator using the same port connection is also available.

=== Pavilion dv9600 ===
The Pavilion dv9600 is a sub-brand of the dv9500 model series, itself a variation of the Pavilion dv9000 series of laptops. It became generally available in 2007. Two models released within the dv9600 series were the dv9600t and dv9600z, differing with their options of processors and graphics hardware as well as their feature sets. The dv9600t series featured Intel processors with Intel chipsets while the dv9600z series featured AMD processors and Nvidia nForce chipsets.

Model numbers for the dv9600 series range from dv9600 to dv9699.

==== Pavilion dv9600t ====
Uses Intel CPUs and an Intel Crestline GM/PM965 motherboard.

===== Specifications =====
See "HP Pavilion dv9500t" specifications above.

==== Pavilion dv9600z ====
Uses AMD CPUs and an nForce 630M MCP67M/MCP67D motherboard.

===== Specifications =====
See "HP Pavilion dv9500z" specifications above.

==== Pavilion dv9620us ====
Pre-configured AMD model released in October 2007.

===== Specifications =====
- Processor: Tyler-class (65 nm) Turion 64 X2 TL-58 1.9 GHz
  - Front side bus: HyperTransport (800 MHz / 1600 MT/s)
- Graphics: NVIDIA GeForce 7150M (up to 256 MB maximum)
- Display: 17.0" 16:10 aspect ratio WXGA (1440 x 900) LCD
- Video output: S-video, VGA (resolution depends on graphics display adapter)
- Speakers: integrated Altec Lansing stereo speakers
- Audio output: analog only. Features two 3.5 mm stereo jacks.
- Chipset: nForce 630M MCP67M/MCP67D
- BIOS: Phoenix BIOS
  - RAID support: No support for hardware RAID configurations. RAID configurations only supported in software via dynamic disks (AKA striped or spanned volumes; not supported in "Home" editions of Windows)
- Memory: 2 GB maximum, 2 slots DDR2, 1.8 volt unbuffered, asymmetric or interleaved operation supported
- Storage: 2 internal SATA 2.5" drive bays, supports compatible hard disk drives (and solid state drives)
  - Two hard drives can be used in a RAID configuration, usually in software, by a supported operating system. RAID support (either hardware or software) is not required to use a secondary hard drive. Alternatively, both drives can be used as separate individual drives.
  - Supports up to 500 GB of hard drive storage using dual 250 GB hard drives in a software RAID configuration
- Optical drive: LightScribe SuperMulti 8X DVD±RW and 24X CD-RW combo drive with double layer support
- Battery: 8-cell li-ion (17.6 Ah) or high-capacity 8-cell li-ion (20.4 Ah)
- Network: Ethernet 10/100BT integrated network interface; high-speed 56k modem
- Wireless: Broadcom 4321AGN Wi-Fi adapter (without Bluetooth)
  - It also has an option for mobile broadband from the Verizon Wireless V740 ExpressCard.
- Media: microphone, 1.3-megapixel webcam (HP WebCam)
- Security: Kensington lock
- I/O ports: 4 USB 2.0, IEEE 1394 FireWire, PCI expansion port 3 (proprietary bus for docking port), ExpressCard/54, Integrated Consumer IR (remote control receiver), 5-in-1 digital media card reader, microphone in, RJ-11 (modem), RJ-45 (LAN), VGA, TV out (S-video). External SATA (eSATA) is not supported.
- HP imprint design: Radiance imprint finish
- Operating system: Windows Vista Home Premium (32-bit)
- Dimensions (inches): 15.16 length x 11.65 width x 1.57 maximum closed height
- Weight: approximately 7.7 lb (3.5 kg)
- Accessories: remote control, 90 watt AC power adapter
  - Dock/base: Supports the HP xb3000 docking station, connected via the proprietary PCI expansion port 3. The HP Notebook QuickDock port replicator using the same port connection is also available.

=== Pavilion dv9700 ===
The Pavilion dv9700 is a variation of the Pavilion dv9000 series of laptops, which was announced sometime in 2007 before being released as early as November of that year, with the models becoming generally available to retail by January 2008. It was the last model of the Pavilion dv9000 series of laptops, succeeding the prior Pavilion dv9500 and dv9600 series. Two models released within the dv9700 series were the dv9700t and dv9700z, differing with their options of processors and graphics hardware as well as their feature sets. The dv9700t series featured Intel processors with Intel chipsets while the dv9700z series featured AMD processors and Nvidia nForce chipsets.

Model numbers for the dv9700 series range from dv9700 to dv9999.

==== Pavilion dv9700t ====
Uses Intel CPUs and an Intel Crestline GM/PM965 motherboard.

===== Specifications =====
- Processor: Penryn-class (45nm) T5550 1.8 GHz, T8100 (SLAUU) 2.1 GHz, T8300 (SLAPU) 2.4 GHz, T9300 2.5 GHz, T9500 2.6 GHz
  - Front side bus: 667 MHz to 800 MHz (dependent on processor model); The T5550 is limited to 667 MHz.
- Graphics: Intel GMA X3100 UMA, Nvidia GeForce 8400M GS (256 MB) or GeForce 8600M GS (512 MB)
- Display: 17.0" 16:10 aspect ratio WXGA (1440 x 900) LCD
  - WXGA+ panels came in either a single or dual lamp configuration; WSXGA+ panels only came in a single lamp configuration.
- Video output: HDMI 1080p, S-video, VGA (resolution depends on graphics display adapter)
- Speakers: integrated Altec Lansing stereo speakers
- Audio output: analog and digital. Early models had three separate audio outputs: one 3.5 mm stereo, one S/PDIF optical and one HDMI. Later models only have two outputs: one 3.5 mm stereo and one HDMI, with the S/PDIF optical jack being replaced with a secondary stereo jack. The HP product documentation alludes to this change.
- Chipset: Intel Crestline PM965 or Intel Crestline GM965 featuring I/O Controller Hub 8 (ICH8) southbridge
- BIOS: Phoenix BIOS
  - RAID support: No support for hardware RAID configurations. RAID configurations only supported in software via dynamic disks (AKA striped or spanned volumes; not supported in "Home" editions of Windows)
- Memory: 4 GB maximum, 2 slots DDR2, 1.8 volt unbuffered, asymmetric or interleaved operation supported. Intel specifies that only 533 to 667 MHz memory clock speed is supported; but HP pre-sales telephone support has stated twice that the motherboard does support 533 to 800 MHz memory. The sales team does not differentiate between compatibility and utilization. 800 MHz DDR2 is being installed for orders that include 800 MHz-capable processors.
- Storage: 2 internal SATA 2.5" drive bays, supports compatible hard disk drives (and solid state drives)
  - Two hard drives can be used in a RAID configuration, usually in software, by a supported operating system. RAID support (either hardware or software) is not required to use a secondary hard drive. Alternatively, both drives can be used as separate individual drives.
  - Supports up to 500 GB of hard drive storage using dual 250 GB hard drives in a software RAID configuration
- Optical drive: LightScribe SuperMulti 8X DVD±RW and 24X CD-RW combo drive with double layer support
  - Optional HD DVD or Blu-ray optical drives are available.
- Battery: 8-cell li-ion (17.6 Ah) or high-capacity 8-cell li-ion (20.4 Ah)
- Network: Ethernet 10/100/1000 integrated network interface; high-speed 56k modem
- Wireless: Intel PRO/Wireless 4965AGN (with or without Bluetooth)
  - Optional integrated Bluetooth and mobile broadband via the Verizon Wireless V740 ExpressCard are available.
- Media: Microphone, 1.3-megapixel webcam (HP WebCam)
- Security: Kensington lock, fingerprint reader
- I/O ports: 4 USB 2.0 (3 on models with fingerprint reader), IEEE 1394 FireWire, PCI expansion port 3 (proprietary bus for docking port), ExpressCard/54, Integrated Consumer IR (remote control receiver), 5-in-1 digital media card reader, microphone in, RJ-11 (modem), RJ-45 (LAN), VGA, TV out (S-video), HDMI. External SATA (eSATA) is not supported.
- HP imprint design: Radiance imprint finish
- Operating system(s): Windows Vista Home Premium (32-bit/64-bit), Windows Vista Business (32-bit; optional), Windows Vista Ultimate (64-bit; optional)
- Dimensions (inches): 15.16 length x 11.65 width x 1.57 maximum closed height
- Weight: approximately 7.7 lb (3.5 kg) to 8.2 lb (3.7 kg)
- Accessories: remote control, 90 watt AC power adapter
  - Dock/base: Supports the HP xb3000 docking station, connected via the proprietary PCI expansion port 3. The HP Notebook QuickDock port replicator using the same port connection is also available.

==== Pavilion dv9700z ====
Uses AMD CPUs and an nForce 630M MCP67M/MCP67D motherboard.

===== Specifications =====
- Processor: Tyler-class (65 nm) Athlon 64 X2 TK-53 1.7 GHz, TK-55 1.86 GHz; Turion 64 X2 TL-56 1.8 GHz, TL-58 1.9 GHz, TL-60 2.0 GHz, TL-62 2.1 GHz, TL-64 2.2 GHz, TL-66 2.3 GHz, TL-68 2.4 GHz
  - Front side bus: HyperTransport (800 MHz / 1600 MT/s)
- Graphics: Nvidia GeForce 7150M or GeForce 8400M GS (256 MB)
- Display: 17.0" 16:10 aspect ratio WXGA (1440 x 900) LCD
  - WXGA+ panels came in either a single or dual lamp configuration; WSXGA+ panels only came in a single lamp configuration.
- Video output: HDMI 1080p (only on some models), S-video, VGA (resolution depends on graphics display adapter)
- Speakers: integrated Altec Lansing stereo speakers
- Audio output: analog and digital. Early models had three separate audio outputs: one 3.5 mm stereo, one S/PDIF optical and one HDMI (on some models). Later models only have two outputs: one 3.5 mm stereo and one HDMI (on some models), with the S/PDIF optical jack being replaced with a secondary stereo jack. The HP product documentation alludes to this change.
- Chipset: nForce 630M MCP67M/MCP67D
- BIOS: Phoenix BIOS
  - RAID support: no support for hardware RAID configurations. RAID configurations only supported in software via dynamic disks (AKA striped or spanned volumes; not supported in "Home" editions of Windows)
- Memory: 4 GB maximum, 2 slots DDR2, 1.8 volt unbuffered, asymmetric or interleaved operation supported
- Storage: 2 internal SATA 2.5" drive bays, supports compatible hard disk drives (and solid state drives)
  - Two hard drives can be used in a RAID configuration, usually in software, by a supported operating system. RAID support (either hardware or software) is not required to use a secondary hard drive. Alternatively, both drives can be used as separate individual drives.
  - Supports up to 500 GB of hard drive storage using dual 250 GB hard drives in a software RAID configuration
- Optical drive: LightScribe SuperMulti 8X DVD±RW and 24X CD-RW combo drive with double layer support
  - Optional HD DVD optical drives are available on some models.
- Battery: 8-cell li-ion (17.6 Ah) or high-capacity 8-cell li-ion (20.4 Ah)
- Network: Ethernet 10/100BT integrated network interface; high-speed 56k modem
- Wireless: Broadcom 4321AGN Wi-Fi adapter (with or without Bluetooth)
  - Optional integrated Bluetooth and mobile broadband via the Verizon Wireless V740 ExpressCard are available.
- Media: Microphone, 1.3-megapixel webcam (HP WebCam)
- Security: Kensington lock, fingerprint reader
- I/O ports: 4 USB 2.0 (3 on models with fingerprint reader), IEEE 1394 FireWire, PCI expansion port 3 (proprietary bus for docking port), ExpressCard/54, Integrated Consumer IR (remote control receiver), 5-in-1 digital media card reader, microphone in, RJ-11 (modem), RJ-45 (LAN), VGA, TV out (S-video), HDMI (only on some models). External SATA (eSATA) is not supported.
- HP imprint design: Radiance imprint finish
- Operating system(s): Windows Vista Home Premium (32-bit/64-bit), Windows Vista Business (32-bit; optional), Windows Vista Ultimate (64-bit; optional)
- Dimensions (inches): 15.16 length x 11.65 width x 1.57 maximum closed height
- Weight: approximately 7.7 lb (3.5 kg) to 8.2 lb (3.7 kg)
- Accessories: remote control, 90 watt AC power adapter
  - Dock/base: Supports the HP xb3000 docking station, connected via the proprietary PCI expansion port 3. The HP Notebook QuickDock port replicator using the same port connection is also available.

== Manufacturing ==
Quanta Computer Inc., an Original design manufacturer (ODM), manufacturers the hardware, motherboard, and design of the dv9000 series of laptops alongside the dv2000 and dv6000 series (as well as other HP laptops made by HP at the time). This was a common practice by many other brands of the era.

== Performance ==
Note: current listings are posted from independent testing by author. Updates/revisions are requested from verifiable third-party websites.

- High-capacity battery: test on an out-of-box model with dual hard drives, 2.4 GHz processor, 4 GB RAM, no external attachments, Wi-Fi enabled, Balanced power plan, approximately 75% screen brightness yielded 2 hours 35 minutes of DVD runtime before system automatically shut down at 5% battery power.
- Windows Vista: test on an out-of-box model with 2.4 GHz processor, 4 GB RAM, 256 MB graphics adapter, 7200RPM hard drives, no external attachments, Wi-Fi enabled, Balanced power plan yielded a Windows Vista Windows Experience Index of 3.4, with the two lowest scores being Graphics (3.4) and Gaming Graphics (4.5). Comparatively, the Dell XPS M1530 with matching configuration yielded a Windows Experience Index of 5.1.
- Windows 7: test on an out-of-box model with 2.6 GHz processor, 4 GB RAM, 512 MB graphics adapter, solid state drives, no external attachments, Wi-Fi enabled, (Note: The detailed specs are a dv9700t-series dv9843cl model with slightly upgraded specs, including a 2.6 GHz T9500 processor, 4 GB 800 MHz DDR2 RAM, 512 MB GeForce 8600M GS video graphics adapter, a Samsung 850 EVO 120 GB solid state drive, and 32-bit operating system installed.) results yielded a Windows 7 Windows Experience Index of 4.9, with the two lowest scores being Graphics (4.9) and Gaming Graphics (5.5). Other scores were CPU (6.1), Memory (6.1) and hard disk (7.6). Comparatively, the Dell XPS M1530 of a similar configuration yielded a Windows Experience Index of 5.1.

== Upgrades ==
Note: current suggestions are posted from independent testing by author.

=== Operating systems ===
Windows 7

Windows 7 has been known to work flawlessly on the HP Pavilion dv9000 series in several tests, particularly when using the official Windows Vista drivers provided by HP as they are fully compatible with Windows 7.

Although the laptops supported 64-bit processors, and Windows 7 (and by extension, Windows Vista) was offered in both 32-bit and 64-bit versions, a handful of dv9000 series owners have opted to use 32-bit versions of Windows over the 64-bit versions purely for reasons such as less memory overhead, reduced OS footprint, and much greater compatibility with software and drivers. This is especially important for older computers manufactured in the early-to-mid 2000s, which typically had 32-bit only CPUs prior to 2003/2004, as well as low-end to mid-range computers such as the dv9000 series. Despite this, however, there are some limitations when using a 32-bit OS on a 64-bit capable hardware like the dv9000 series, and therefore it is generally not recommended for those specific use cases.

However, if for whatever reason the user should run the 32-bit version of Windows 7 on a dv9000 series laptop, then certain prerequisites must be made in order for 32-bit versions of Windows to be able to run just as well as the 64-bit versions on the dv9000 series. For instance, a PAE patch is available that allows the operating system to use up to 4 GB memory configurations on 32-bit OSes, as it uses up to 3 GB by default (this patch is also confirmed to work with the then-new monthly update rollup model set by Microsoft in 2016 for Windows 7).

For drivers, the fingerprint scanner drivers with DigitalPersona only works with 32-bit versions of Windows, but 64-bit driver packs are available (see the "Windows 10" section below). The (laptop-only) video drivers for Windows 7 from Nvidia's site can also be used; however, version 341.81 (released August 15, 2015) and later is not recommended for models equipped with the GeForce 8600M GS graphics chips due to sleep and hibernation problems. The last known good version of the graphics drivers as of August 1, 2018 is version 332.21 from December 19, 2013. This version is particularly important for 32-bit OSes with PAE enabled, as PAE support is broken on later 32-bit drivers. Version 179.48 of the graphics drivers is recommended for models equipped with integrated Nvidia graphics chips, and is also the latest version.

Also, some drivers (such as the graphics, sound and modem drivers) may have to be installed manually as the installer on some drivers will not be able to detect drivers for the correct operating system that is being used, but they will still work. This is achieved by bypassing the installer and then extracting the files from them using file archiver programs such as WinZip or WinRAR so that they can be installed directly via Device Manager.

An SSD is preferably (but highly) recommended for better performance in modern times; see the "hardware" section below for more information about SSDs.

Windows 10

Windows 10 has also been known to run just as well as (if not better than) Windows 7 on the HP Pavilion dv9000 series of laptops in various tests despite running on the older hardware.

As with the "Windows 7" section above, the same general consensus apply to those using either the 32-bit or 64-bit versions of Windows 10 on an older laptop like the dv9000 series, including their aforementioned advantages/disadvantages. The aforementioned PAE patch for 32-bit versions of Windows 7 has since been updated to provide compatibility with 32-bit versions of Windows 10. Again, an SSD is preferably (but highly) recommended for better performance in modern times; see the "hardware" section below for more information about SSDs.

Nearly all the drivers meant for the dv9000 series are included by default in Windows 10, but some drivers must be installed beforehand. Those installing the fingerprint scanner drivers with DigitalPersona must follow the Windows 7 installation instructions for DigitalPersona in order to install it on Windows 10; 64-bit versions of Windows 10 will likely need separate driver packs, and in the case of the fingerprint scanner drivers with DigitalPersona, these driver packs include sp35583 (drivers). and sp48018 (DigitalPersona). The Ricoh SD card reader will likely need driver pack sp45112. The Synaptics touchpad driver has driver packs in both 32-bit (sp37065 and 64-bit (sp51647) versions; one of them needs to be installed for the appropriate CPU architecture. The drivers for the HP Quick Launch Buttons (QLB) will need the sp40139 driver pack.

The same graphics driver versions for Windows 7 also applies to Windows 10. Version 332.21, dated December 19, 2013, is highly recommended for 32-bit versions of Windows 10 on models using discrete GeForce 8600M GS graphics chips, as later 32-bit drivers have aforementioned issues with PAE support as well as sleep and hibernation problems starting with driver version 341.81 and later as mentioned in the "Windows 7" section above. Models with integrated Nvidia graphics chips should be able to use the latest (and recommended) drivers available, that being version 179.48.

Again, some drivers will also need to be manually installed as the installer would not detect the current operating system being used; the same methods as mentioned in the "Windows 7" section above would also apply here.

The user will also need to exclude driver updates from Windows Update by editing the registry using the registry key "ExcludeWUDriversInQualityUpdate"=dword:00000001, which must be placed at HKEY_LOCAL_MACHINE\SOFTWARE\Policies\Microsoft\Windows\WindowsUpdate. This method will also apply to Windows 7 as well; however, it is unnecessary to do so.

Third-party and open-source utilities like Open-Shell, Desktop Gadgets Revived, and ExplorerPatcher can be used to achieve a Windows 7-like experience on Windows 10, and several tools and utilities are also available to transform Windows 10 into Windows 7 even more, including bringing the Windows 7 look-and-feel (complete with the Windows Aero interface and icons) into Windows 10.

=== Hardware ===
Wi-Fi wireless cards

The Intel PRO/Wireless 7260AC 802.11ac (Wi-Fi 5) wireless card is known to work well with the dv9000 series of laptops, especially for Intel-based models. It dramatically increases wireless connection speeds of up to 866 Mbit/s (2x2), much higher than that of the provided Intel PRO/Wireless 4965AGN 802.11g (Wi-Fi 3) wireless cards included with all Intel-based models since the dv9500t series. They consume less power and generate less heat than the 4965AGN wireless cards, which were known to get hot under normal operations, and is also half the size of said wireless cards. The Intel AX200 802.11ax (Wi-Fi 6) gigabit wireless card is also known to work with the dv9000 series of laptops under Windows 10 64-bit as of April 27, 2018, which also provides much higher connection speeds than the 7260AC and 4965AGN wireless cards.

In order to use these above mentioned wireless cards, a modified BIOS with the whitelist removed (which is specific to each model) must be used. The BIOS for each specific model can be determined by checking the SP number for the BIOS, which can be used to find an equivalent driver pack (with the format "spxxxxx.exe") containing the modified BIOS with the whitelist removed.

Solid-state drives

While solid-state drives (SSDs) are typically more expensive than hard disk drives (HDDs), they have become a popular alternative for data storage in older computers and laptops in recent years. Such advantages of SSDs over HDDs include faster data access and transfer speeds, a lower power consumption and quieter operation, less reliance on moving parts, and (in some cases) more reliable performance (see Solid-state drive § Comparison with other technologies for more info). Most SSDs on the market today are also more affordable than with earlier SSDs released during the heyday of the dv9000 series.

SSDs using a SATA 2.5-inch HDD form factor of any revision will work on the dv9000 series (as well as many other laptops with SATA connections), provided that the user has the proprietary connection adapter specific to the dv9000 series. SSDs using the NVMe M.2 form factor will also work as well via an M.2-to-SATA adapter. However, the drives will run at the slower SATA-II speed due to how the laptops were built (see the SATA § Backward and forward compatibility for more info on compatibility between SATA-II and SATA-III devices), but still provides a significant speed boost in internal hard drive storage.

USB 3.0 expansions

There are several third-party USB 3.0 expansion cards using the ExpressCard format that are offered on sites like eBay. These expansion cards uses a Renesas (formerly NEC Electronics) μPD720202 chipset. Most USB 3.0 ExpressCard expansions on the market today are two-port ones, which provides up to two SuperSpeed USB 3.0 ports and one power jack port to supply additional power for the USB 3.0 ports. A power adapter is included with these cards for the same reason, and is usually plugged into one of the USB ports on the computer.

There are also three-port USB 3.0 ExpressCard expansions available, providing up to three SuperSpeed USB 3.0 ports, but these tend to be more problematic than two-port ones as many USB 3.0-compliant devices require much higher power requirements than that of USB 2.0-compliant devices, which can exceed that of three-port USB 3.0 expansions.

These USB 3.0 expansions are not specific to the dv9000 series, as they are designed to be compatible with every other laptop and notebook computers available with ExpressCard slots.

== Known issues ==
=== Fracturing display hinges ===
Between November 2008 and May 2009, HP recalled many notebooks made by the company due to a design fault that would potentially cause one or both of the hinges to fracture or break off. The use of thin flexible aluminium within a critical location of stress and tension to hold up the large LCD screen was considered a poor choice for a product designed to be opened and closed frequently, resulting in broken or fractured hinges. The right-side hinge will most likely fail; it is not a question of if, but when; but it is not difficult or expensive to replace it as long as no other damage occurred to it when it broke at the time of failure. One sign of a failed hinge is a slight cracking sound on either side of the laptop when closing the lid. If the user does not use their laptop in the event of a hinge failure, no further damage is likely to occur, but reopening it will result in permanent damage to the rear cover due to the failed hinges, making repairs very difficult and expensive.

These issues (among others) led to poor customer service from HP's warranty department; one disappointed customer even reported to a service representative warning them to just "leave the laptop open and don't close the lid, or it may break". Many customers also believed that HP is not standing by with their products, only offering a short 6-month period for repairs, which will simply reoccur due to the poor design of the hinges.

OEM hinges are made of aluminium, which can be distinguished by the shiny silver quality of the lower hinge assembly. Aftermarket replacements are made out of cast with a dull gray color and will not fit properly, nor are the threads properly tapped into the right side mounting holes. This can make replacing the hinges a non-trivial task.

This defect is found on the HP Pavilion dv2000/dv6000/dv9000 series of laptops, and was partly remedied with the later models of the HP Pavilion dv series of laptops/notebooks (e.g. dv2/dv3/dv4/dv5/dv6/dv7) as they use a different design for the hinges.

=== GPU "bumpgate" and overheating ===
The discrete Nvidia graphics chips offered in the high-end models of the HP Pavilion dv9000 series (which included some dv9000, dv9200, dv9500, dv9600, and dv9700 models) as well as several other laptops and notebook computers made by other manufacturers of the time such as the GeForce 8400M and 8600M are infamous for the "bumpgate" problem, which was a type of GPU failure caused by a defective underfill used during manufacturing. This is caused by the repeated thermal cycles from regular use causing the underfill to lose its ability to properly secure the GPU die to the substrate, causing the connecting solder bumps to gradually weaken and eventually break.

Also, the fan and intake vents are vulnerable to clogging up with dust and debris inside the system due to the lack of grating over the intake fan, which can lead to overheating problems. This can also accelerate the weakening of the solder bumps of the built-in GPUs. Some users have recommended a resoldering of the Nvidia GPUs on the motherboard due to the overheating and regular long-term use causing the solder of the GPUs to liquify. Some integrated Nvidia graphics chips like the GeForce Go 6150 are also prone to overheating issues.

HP has since acknowledged these issues as a common "hardware issue with certain dv2000/dv6000/dv9000" series of notebooks in 2008/2009, with the affected models being eligible for repair under their limited warranty services.

=== Miscellaneous issues ===
The wireless card on some dv9000 series models may cease to stop functioning at some point during long-term use, which can be identified by the computer losing all wireless connections along with the wireless adapter not being detected by Device Manager or other computer hardware information programs. Other problems include receiving no video from either the LCD panel or an external monitor, to the laptops not receiving any power or not starting up properly. Some of these issues may also be linked to the overheating problems mentioned above.
