= HP xb3000 =

Docking station accessory by HP

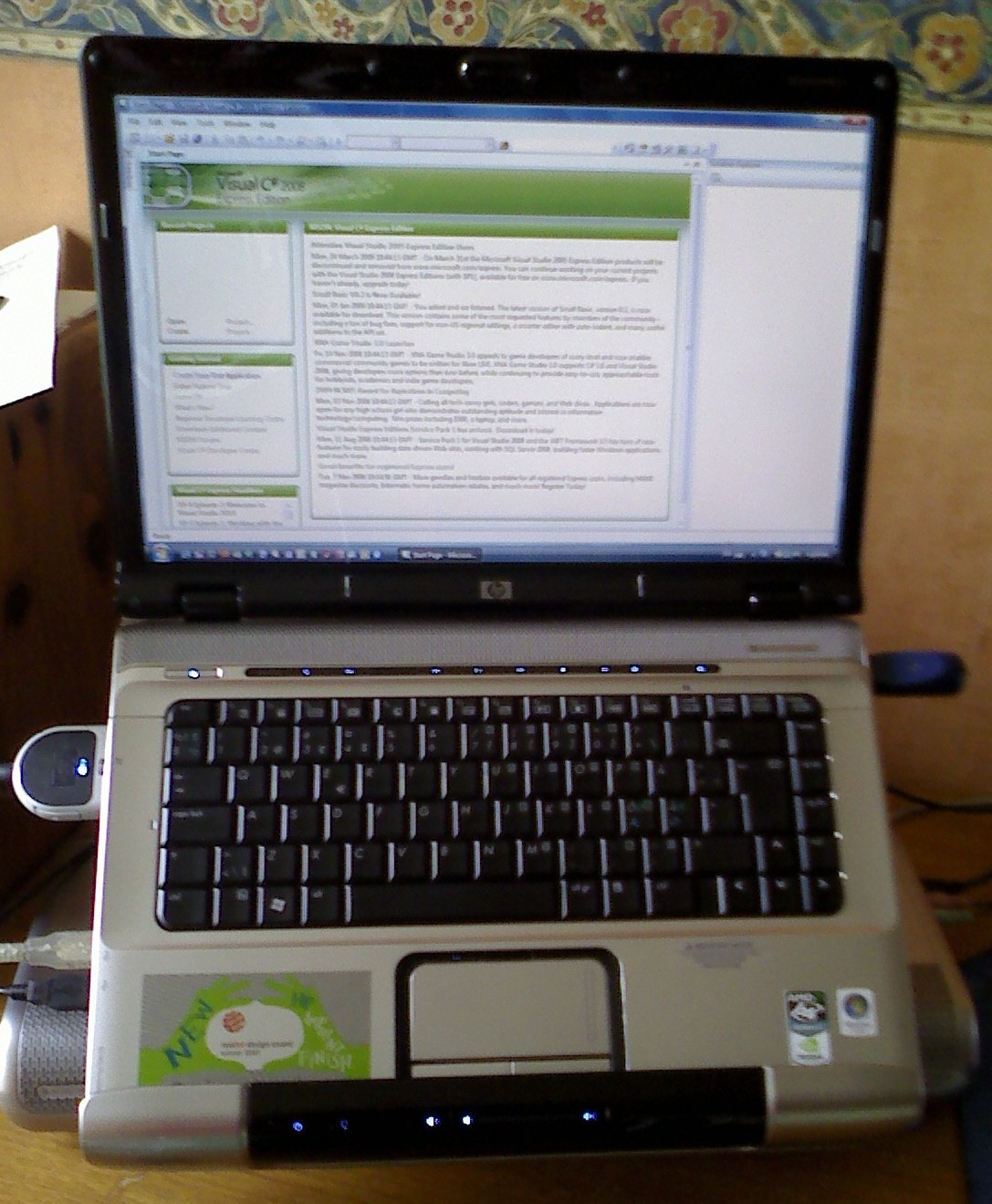
HP Pavilion dv6000 laptop (dv6618eo) with xb3000 Expansion Base

The HP xb3000 Notebook Expansion Base is a laptop docking station manufactured by Hewlett-Packard Company. It was first introduced alongside HP's new line of mobility products in May 2006, which includes the dv2000 series of HP Pavilion laptops.

Its notable features include an inclining tray, a PCI expansion port 3 cable interface (with an adapter for compatibility with another PCI expansion port interface (PCI expansion port 2)), and an integrated 16-bit AT hard drive bay. It was shipped with a USB wireless receiver, wireless keyboard and mouse in select models.

== Specifications ==
Several features of the docking station include:

=== Features ===
- Adjustable vertical tray for height and viewpoint
- Integrated Altec Lansing stereo speakers
- Supports laptop screen displays up to 17"
- Kensington lock slot for security
- Integrated Consumer (IR) port (for use with optional remote control)
- Direct charging of the laptop’s battery without plugging in directly into the laptop
- Includes an adapter (HP Expansion Accessory Adapter) on some models for compatibility with laptops using PCI expansion port 2
- Additional hard disk drive bay for an optional hard disk drive

=== Hosted ports ===
- 3.5 mm stereo TRS connector
- 3.5 mm stereo microphone TRS connector
- 6 USB 2.0
- DC power input (supports laptop AC adaptor)
- Composite video out
- S-video out
- YPbPr component video out
- S/PDIF digital audio out
- VGA
- 10/100 Ethernet (RJ-45)
- Separate DC power input cutout for integrated hard disk drive bay
- Proprietary 16-bit AT hard drive interface

=== Optional features/components ===
- Wireless receiver, keyboard, and mouse included in select models of the xb3000 docking station in some regions and countries.
- HP Mobile Remote Control for use with the integrated IR port to control media applications.
- HP 400GB Hard Drive Kit (HP product number RR041AA#ABA). Includes a 400 GB 7200 RPM SATA hard disk drive and hard drive caddy. The hard drive caddy has a 16-bit AT cable interface for the hard drive and a proprietary 16-bit connector for the docking station.

== Compatible notebook PCs ==
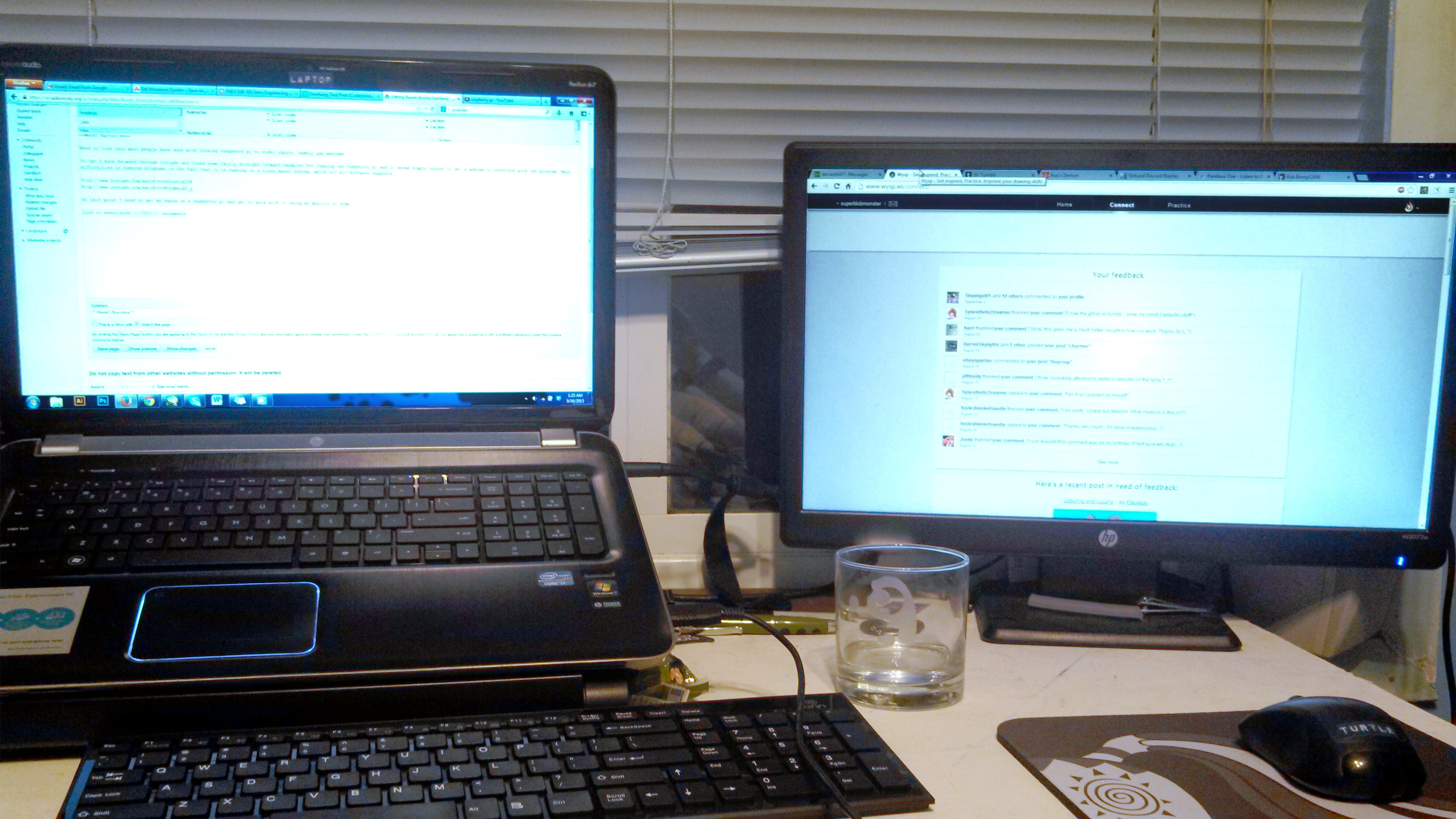
HP Pavilion dv7-6000 laptop with xb3000 Expansion Base and external display

The docking station is compatible with several models of laptops manufactured by Hewlett-Packard that uses the proprietary PCI Expansion Port 3 port.

The following laptops manufactured by Hewlett-Packard are compatible with the xb3000 docking station:

- HP Pavilion dv9000, dv6000, dx6000, dv2000, tx1000, tx2500 series
- Compaq Presario V6000, V3000 series

The docking station is also compatible with the following laptops manufactured by Hewlett-Packard with PCI Expansion Port 2 ports through the use of an adapter (HP Expansion Accessory Adapter) with some limitations (see below):

- HP Pavilion dv8000, dv5000, dv4000, dv1400, ze2000 series
- Compaq Presario ze2000, X6000, V5000, V4000, V2000, M2000 series
- HP Compaq nx4820
- HP Special Edition L2000 series

When using the HP Expansion Accessory Adapter on laptop models with PCI Expansion Port 2, the following features are unavailable or not supported:

- VGA video out
- Built-in power button on docking station
- 3.5 mm stereo microphone TRS connector (works in mono only)

Undocumented but compatible:

- HP Pavilion dv4, dv5, dv6, dv7 and dv8 series
- HP HDX 9000
- HP HDX 18t
- HP HDX 16t

== Operating system support ==
The docking station is compatible with versions of Microsoft Windows such as Windows 98, Windows 2000, Windows Me, and Windows XP. The docking station also supports Windows Vista and Windows 7.
