= HP Pavilion dv2z =

Notebook series by Hewlett-Packard Company

HP Pavilion dv2 series
- Developer: Hewlett-Packard (HP Inc.)
- Type: Laptop/notebook
- Released: 2009
- Display: 12.1" 16:9
- Predecessor: HP Mini
- Successor: HP Envy x2; HP Pavilion (?)
- Related: HP Pavilion: dv7 (17"), dv6 (15+"), dv5 (15"), dv4 (14") series

The HP Pavilion dv2 was a series of 12" notebooks manufactured by Hewlett-Packard Company.

== DV2z ==
In January 2009, AMD announced the Yukon mobile platform for ultra-portable notebooks. The announcement was shortly followed by HP introducing the dv2z based on the Yukon platform. The dv2z was an ultra-portable notebook that measured under 1-inch thick and weighed under 3.81 pounds. The traditional internal optical drive (DVD-ROM) was moved to an external USB enclosure to allow for the slimmer design.

The laptop initially came with an AMD Athlon Neo MV-40 processor and used ATI Radeon Xpress X1250 integrated graphics. The ATI Mobility Radeon HD 3410 was an optional discrete GPU. On June 9, 2009, HP incorporated the dual-core AMD Athlon/Turion Neo X2 processors.

The laptop came with Microsoft Windows Vista pre-installed. A free upgrade offer for Microsoft Windows 7 was made available later in 2009.

=== Configuration ===
- Processors AMD Athlon Neo MV-40 1.6 GHz (single core) or AMD Athlon/Turion Neo X2 1.6 GHz (dual core)
- Memory 1x DDR2 SO-DIMM, maximum 4 GB, single-channel, 400 MHz (PC2-6400)
- Chipset AMD RS690M + SB600
- Graphics ATI Radeon Xpress X1250 IGP or discrete ATI Radeon HD 3410 512 MB (DDR2)
- Display 12.1-inch 1280x800 WXGA TN with glossy finish
- Sound IDT high-definition audio
- Storage SATA-II hard disk with impact sensor
- Network Broadcom BCM4322 802.11a/b/g/n with Bluetooth, wired RJ-45 Realtek Fast Ethernet
- Camera 2.1 MP Chicony Electronics
- Battery 4910 mAh 3-cell Lithium Ion
- Optical Drive optional USB 2.0 External CDRW/Blu-ray
- Mobile broadband optional mobile broadband chipset with Gobi
- Operating System Microsoft Windows Vista or Windows 7 32/64-bit
- Build aluminium-magnesium alloy chassis in either "espresso black" or "moonlight white" finish
- External Ports 1x Fast Ethernet, 1x VGA, 1x microphone jack, 1x headphone jack, 3x USB-2.0 ports, 1x HDMI, 5-in-1 flash reader, 1x power adapter port
