= HP Pavilion dv7 =

Series of laptops by Hewlett-Packard

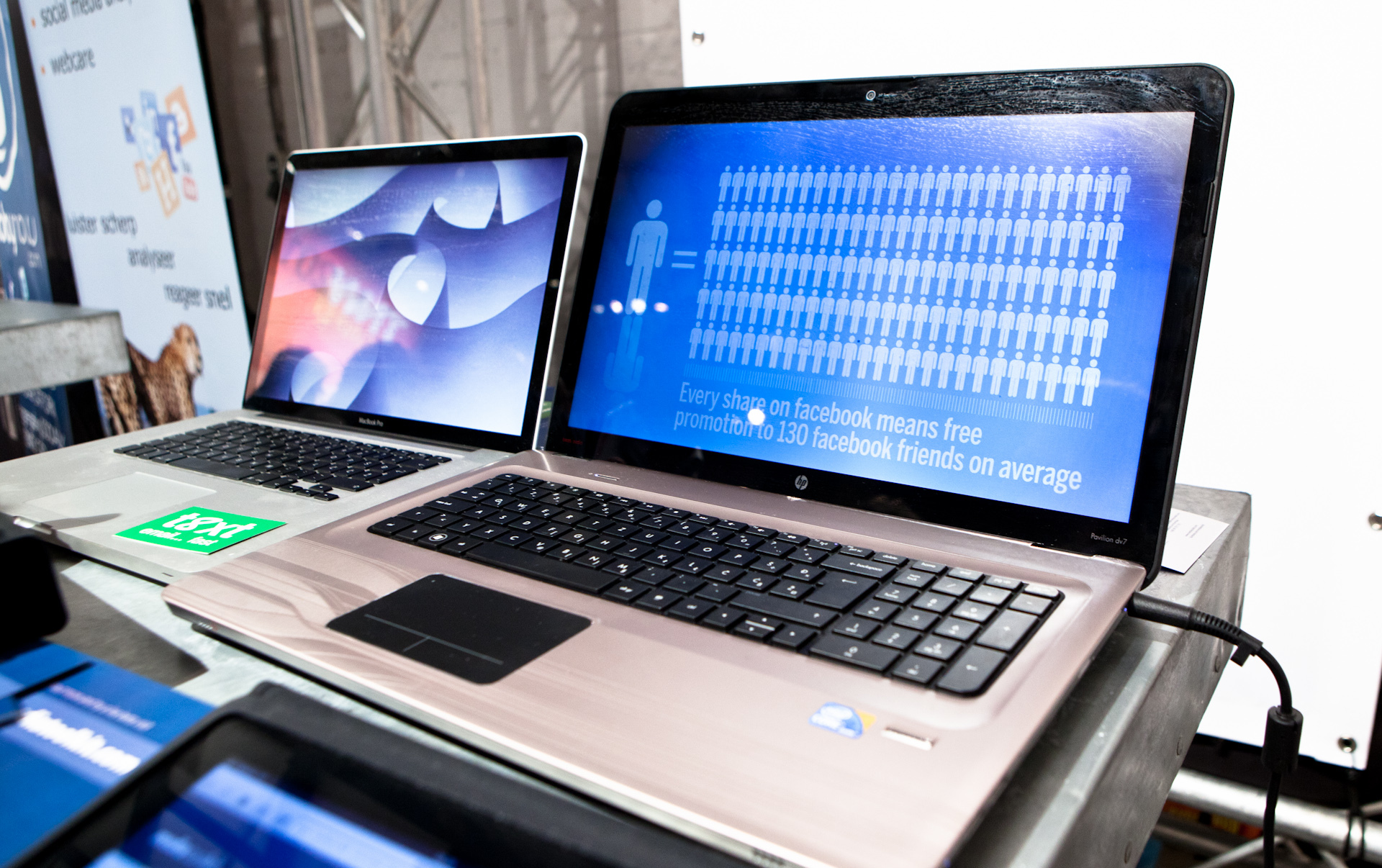
- Pavilion dv7-4000
- Developer: Hewlett-Packard (HP Inc.)
- Type: Laptop
- Released: June 10, 2008; 18 years ago
- Lifespan: 2008–2012
- Discontinued: 2012; 14 years ago
- Display: 17.0" or 17.3"
- Predecessor: dv9000
- Successor: Envy dv7, Pavilion m7
- Related: dv2, dv4, dv5, dv6, dv8

The HP Pavilion dv7 was a model series of laptops manufactured by Hewlett-Packard Company from 2008 to 2012 that featured 16:10 17.0" or 16:9 17.3" diagonal displays. It was produced concurrently with the dv4 and dv5 series, featuring 14.1" and 15.4" displays respectively.

Like most laptops with 17"+ displays at the time, the Pavilion dv7 had room for two hard drives, but most models were only shipped with one drive. If a second hard drive were to be fitted, then a hardware kit consisting of a bracket, connector cable, Mylar shield and screws is required. This is especially important for users trying to add a secondary hard drive, however some pre-configured or build-to-order models did include a secondary hard drive built-in as standard. The Pavilion dv7 has also been used as a common platform for scientific research collection and processing.

The Pavilion dv7 (alongside many others such as the dv2, dv3, dv4, dv5 and dv6) has since been out of production as of August 2012, due to most Pavilion laptops (namely the Pavilion m4, m6, dv6 and dv7 series) being rebranded into the premium HP Envy lineup in 2013.

== Models ==
- dv7t – uses an Intel processor
- dv7z – uses an AMD processor

=== dv7-1000 to dv7-1400 series ===
The first models were produced alongside the dv5 series, introduced in June 2008 and released in July of that year, replacing the previous HP Pavilion dv9000 series. Display is 17.0" CCFL WXGA+ (1440 × 900) or WSXGA+ (1680 × 1050). They utilized the new HP Imprint 2 finish, the successor to the original HP Imprint design from 2006 to 2008, featuring a liquid-metallic design offered in three patterns: Meshy, Intersect, and Espresso. All models up to the dv7-3xxx series were shipped with Windows Vista preinstalled.

	Intel	AMD
Processor	Intel Core 2 Duo (Socket P)	AMD Athlon X2/Turion X2 (Socket S1G2)
Graphics	Nvidia GeForce 9300M GS, Nvidia GeForce 9600M GT	ATI Mobility Radeon HD 3200 (UMA), ATI Mobility Radeon HD (M82) 3450 256 MB

=== dv7-1000/2000 to dv7-2300 series ===
Models produced alongside the dv6 series, released in 2009. Display sizes changed, using 17.3" LED HD+ (1600 × 900) displays with BrightView or flush glass AntiGlare. New look. MediaPlay button was removed from the capacitive board. Uses HP Imprint 2 finish in four patterns: Meshy, Intersect, Expresso, Moonlight.

	Intel	AMD
Processor	Intel Pentium Dual Core, or Core 2 Duo, or Core 2 Quad (Socket P)	AMD Athlon X2/Turion X2 (Socket S1G2)
Graphics	Intel GMA 4700MHD (UMA), ATI Mobility Radeon HD 4530 (M92) 512 MB, ATI Mobility Radeon HD 4650 (M96) 1024 MB	ATI Radeon 4250 (UMA), ATI Mobility Radeon HD 4530 (M92) 512 MB, ATI Mobility Radeon HD 4650 (M96) 1024 MB

=== dv7-3000 to dv7-3300 series ===
Very similar to the dv7-1000/2000 models, also released in 2009. Last model to ship with Windows Vista preinstalled; later models were shipped with Windows 7.

	Intel	AMD
Processor	Intel Pentium Dual Core, or Core 2 Duo, or Core 2 Quad (Socket P), or Core i5 or i7 (Socket G1)	AMD Athlon II/Turion II (Socket S1G3)
Graphics	Intel GMA 4700MHD (UMA), ATI Mobility Radeon HD 4530 (M92) 512 MB, ATI Mobility Radeon HD 4650 (M96) 1024 MB, Nvidia GeForce G 105M 512 MB, Nvidia GeForce 230M 1024 MB, Nvidia GeForce 320M 1024 MB	ATI Radeon 4250 (UMA), ATI Mobility Radeon HD 4530 (M92) 512 MB, ATI Mobility Radeon HD 4650 (M96) 1024 MB

=== dv7-4000 to dv7-4300 series ===
Models produced alongside the dv6-3000 series, released in 2010. Completely changed the design and construction, reducing the amount of gadget link found in previous models. This includes the removal of the ExpressCard slot, remote control, capacitive board, built-in TV tuner, and PCI expansion port 3 found in previous models, and the ports located on the left side of the laptop are reduced as a result of this. HP Imprint 2 was discontinued in favor of a completely new design featuring a combination of aluminum and plastic materials, using a brushed metal finish with metal etchings instead of a glossy finish with inlaid graphics. This new design and construction was also shared with other HP Pavilion laptops of the time such as the 14.1" dm4 series of laptops. Introduced island keyboard and "ClickPad" touchpad without buttons. A new motherboard and cooling system was also developed. Switchable graphics was introduced. All models were shipped with Windows 7 onwards.

	Intel	AMD
Processor	1st-generation Intel Core i3, i5, i7, or Intel Pentium (2-4 cores, Socket G1)	AMD Phenom II/Athlon II/Turion II (2-4 cores, Socket S1G4)
Graphics (UMA)	Intel HD Graphics	ATI Mobility Radeon HD 4250
Graphics (switchable)	ATI Mobility Radeon HD 5650 1024 MB, ATI Mobility Radeon HD 5470 512 MB	ATI Mobility Radeon HD 5470 512 MB, ATI Mobility Radeon HD 5650 1024 MB, ATI Mobility Radeon HD 6370 512 MB, ATI Mobility Radeon HD 6550 1024 MB

=== dv7-5000 series ===
==== Intel-based notebooks ====
- Processors: 2nd-generation Intel Core i7 Quad Core (Socket G2)
- Graphics: Intel HD Graphics (UMA), switchable ATI Mobility Radeon HD 5650 (1024 MB) or ATI Mobility Radeon HD 5470 (512 MB)

=== dv7-6000 to dv7-6100 series ===
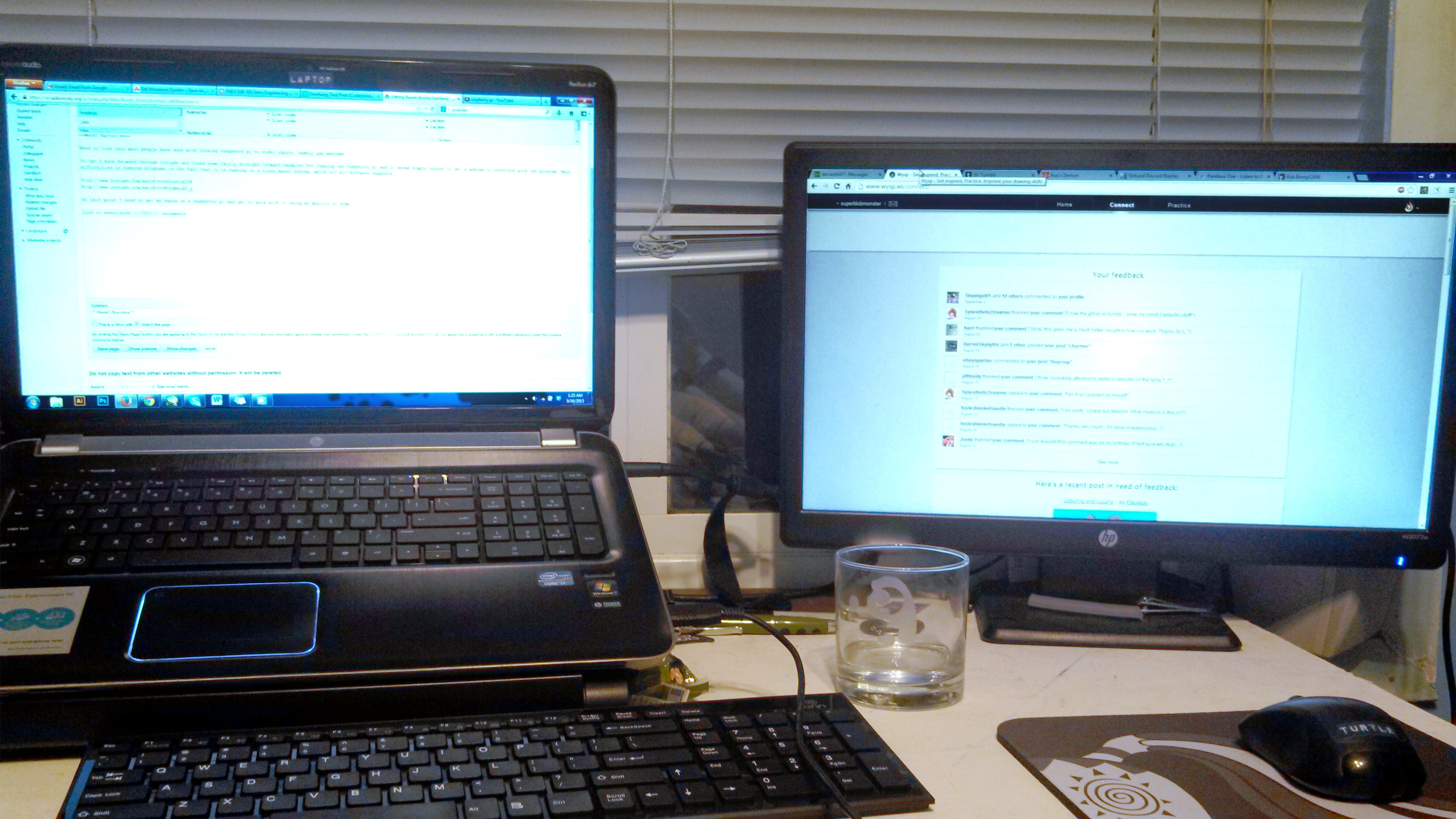
Pavilion dv7-6000 with HP xb3000 stand and external display

Released in 2011. Display is 17.3" LED HD+ (1600 x 900) BrightView or FullHD (1920 × 1080) AntiGlare. New look. Backlit touchpad with mechanical switch. Quad speakers and subwoofer. eSATA combo port was removed.

	Intel	AMD
Processor	2nd-generation Intel Core i3, i5, i7 or Intel Pentium (2-4 cores, Socket G2)	AMD E2, A4, A6, A8 (2-4 cores, Socket FS1), AMD Athlon/Turion/Phenom II (2-4 cores, Socket S1G4)
Graphics (UMA)	Intel HD Graphics	ATI Mobility Radeon HD 4250 128 MB (UMA) for AMD Athlon/Turion/Phenom processors, AMD Radeon HD 6480G (internal) with AMD A4 processors, AMD Radeon HD 6520G (internal) with AMD A6 processors, AMD Radeon HD 6620G (internal) with AMD A8 processors
Graphics (switchable)	ATI Radeon HD 6490M 1 GB, ATI Radeon HD 6770M, ATI Radeon HD 6770M 2 GB	AMD Radeon HD 6755G2, AMD RadeonT HD 6645G2, AMD RadeonT HD 6545G2, AMD RadeonT HD 6515G2, AMD Radeon HD 6650M

=== dv7-7000 and dv7-7100 series ===
Released in 2012. Last Pavilion model in the dv7 series. Some design changes. Quad speakers (two in the lid) and subwoofer. Supported III-generation Intel Core processors and mSATA SSD drive. Later supported two USB 3.0 ports but the second headphone jack was removed. Early models were sold with Windows 7; later models were sold with Windows 8.

	Intel	AMD
Processor	3rd-generation Intel Core i3, i5, i7 (2-4 cores, Socket G2)	AMD A6, A8, A10 (2-4 cores, Socket FS1)
Graphics (UMA)	Intel HD Graphics 3000 or HD Graphics 4000	AMD Radeon HD 7670M 1 GB, AMD Radeon HD 7670M 2 GB, AMD Radeon HD 7730M 2 GB
Graphics (switchable)	Nvidia Geforce 630M 1 GB, Nvidia Geforce 630M 2 GB, Nvidia Geforce 650M 2 GB	AMD Radeon HD 7670M and HD7520G (AMD A6), AMD Radeon HD 7670M and HD7640G (AMD A8), AMD Radeon HD 7670M and HD7660G (AMD A10)

=== ENVY dv7-7200 and dv7-7300 ===
All Pavilion laptops were rebranded as ENVY in 2013 and sold with Windows 8 as the OS. The motherboard was also changed and new CPUs were added. Other specifications remain the same as the previous Pavilion dv7-7000/7100 series notebooks.

In 2015, HP released a new series of HP Envy Laptops including the dv3, dv5 and dv7 models. The models featured a new case design, fingerprint sensor, a lifted hinge, Bang and Olufsen speakers and new Intel Core i processors based on the Skylake architecture. These new models came with Windows 10 preinstalled.
