= HP Pavilion dv4 =

Series of laptop models by Hewlett-Packard

HP Pavilion dv4 series
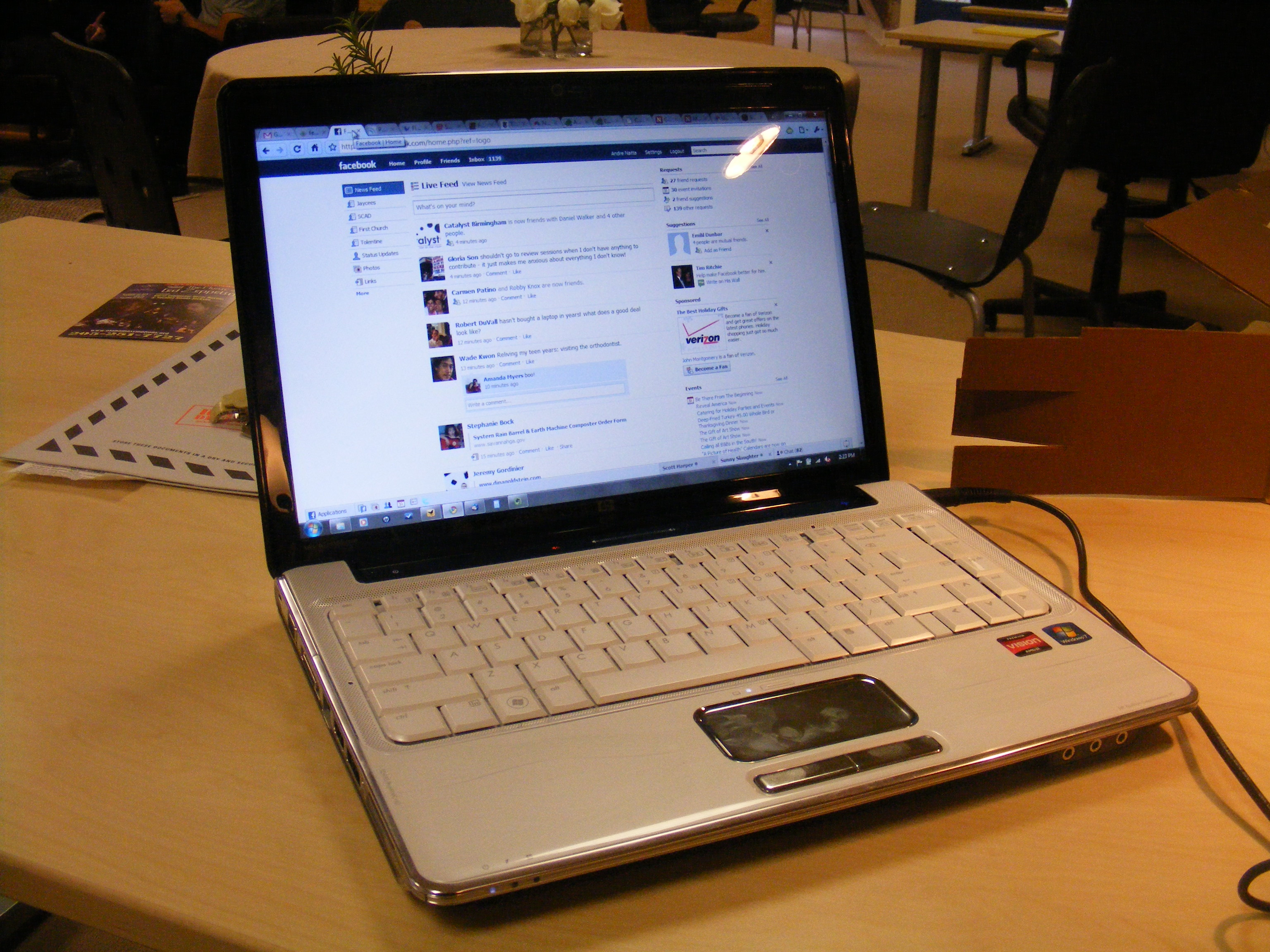
- Developer: Hewlett-Packard (HP Inc.)
- Type: Laptop/notebook
- Released: 2008
- Display: 14.1" 16:9
- Predecessor: HP Pavilion dv2000 series
- Successor: HP Envy dv4; Pavilion dm4
- Related: HP Pavilion: dv7 (17"), dv6 (15+"), dv5 (15"), dv2 (12") series

The HP Pavilion dv4 is a model series of laptops manufactured by Hewlett-Packard Company that features a 14.1" diagonal display. The HP Pavilion dv5 features a 15.4" and the HP Pavilion dv7 a 17" display.

== Models ==
- dv4se (Special Edition) - features the Midnight Wave finish
- dv4-1502yu - uses an Intel processor
- dv4z - uses an AMD processor

== Weight and dimensions ==
	dv4tse	dv4t	dv4z
Weight (with standard battery)	5.18 lb.	4.82 lb.	4.82 lb.
Width (left to right)	13.15 in.	13.15 in.	13.15 in.
Depth (front to back)	9.45 in.	9.45 in.	9.45 in.
Height (max) (thickness)	1.57 in.	1.57 in.	1.57 in.
Height (min) (thickness)	1.34 in.	1.34 in.	1.34 in.

Note: Weight varies by configuration.

== Customizable features ==
The following are customizable features only available in the United States (HP CTO notebooks). Information retrieved from the HP store website, November 2008.

Color	dv4tse	dv4t	dv4z
Onyx		✓	✓
Bronze		✓	✓
Intensity	✓		
Operating system	dv4tse	dv4t	dv4z
Windows Vista Home Basic 32-bit			
Windows Vista Home Premium 32-bit	✓	✓	✓
Windows Vista Home Premium 64-bit	✓	✓	✓
Windows Vista Business 32-bit	✓	✓	✓
Windows Vista Ultimate 64-bit	✓	✓	✓
Windows 7 Home Premium 32-bit		✓	
Windows 7 Home Premium 64-bit		✓	
Processors (AMD)	dv4tse	dv4t	dv4z
(AMD Athlon 64 X2)			
QL-60 (1.9GHz, 1MB (1 L2 cache)			✓
QL-62 (2.0GHz, 1MB (1 L2 cache)			✓
(AMD Turion 64 X2)			
RM-70 (2.0GHz, 1MB L2 cache)			✓
RM-72 (2.1GHz, 1MB L2 cache)			✓
ZM-80 (2.1GHz, 2MB L2 cache)			✓
ZM-84 (2.3GHz, 2MB L2 cache)			✓
(AMD Turion II)			
M520 (2.3GHz, 1MB L2 cache)			✓
Processors (Intel)	dv4tse	dv4t	dv4z
(Intel Pentium Dual-Core)			
T3200 (2.0GHz, 1MB L2 cache, 667MHz FSB)		✓	
(Intel Core 2 Duo)			
T5800 (2.0GHz, 2MB L2 cache, 800MHz FSB)	✓	✓	
P7350 (2.0GHz, 3MB L2 cache, 1066MHz FSB)	✓	✓	
P8400 (2.26GHz, 3MB L2 cache, 1066MHz FSB)	✓	✓	
P8600 (2.40GHz, 3MB L2 cache, 1066MHz FSB)		✓	
T9400 (2.53GHz, 6MB L2 cache, 1066MHz FSB)	✓	✓	
T9600 (2.80GHz, 6MB L2 cache, 1066MHz FSB)	✓	✓	
(Intel Core i)			
i3-330M (2.13GHz, 3MB L2 cache, 2.5GT/s DMI)		✓	
i5-520M (2.4GHz, 3MB L2 cache, 2.5GT/s DMI)		✓	
i5-540M (2.53GHz, 3MB L2 cache, 2.5GT/s DMI)		✓	
Display	dv4tse	dv4t	dv4z
(HP BrightView high-definition widescreen)			
14.1" WXGA (1280 × 800) display		✓	✓
14.1" WXGA (1280 × 800) infinity display	✓	✓	✓
14.1" WXGA (1280 × 800) LED display		✓	✓
Memory (DDR2 system memory (2 DIMM))	dv4tse	dv4t	dv4z
1GB		✓	✓
2GB	✓	✓	✓
3GB	✓	✓	✓
4GB	✓	✓	✓
Graphics card	dv4tse	dv4t	dv4z
Intel GMA 4500MHD		✓	
Intel HD Graphics		✓	
ATI Radeon HD 3200			✓
NVIDIA GeForce 9200M GS (512MB)	✓	✓	
ATI Radeon HD 4550 (512MB)		✓	
Personalization	dv4tse	dv4t	dv4z
Webcam only		✓	✓
Webcam only (infinity display)	✓	✓	✓
Webcam only (LED display)		✓	✓
Webcam + fingerprint reader		✓	✓
Webcam + fingerprint reader (infinity display)		✓	✓
Webcam + fingerprint reader (LED display)		✓	✓
Networking	dv4tse	dv4t	dv4z
802.11b/g WLAN	✓	✓	✓
802.11b/g WLAN + Bluetooth	✓	✓	✓
802.11a/b/g/n WLAN			✓
802.11a/b/g/n WLAN + Bluetooth			✓
Intel WiFi link 5100AGN	✓	✓	
Intel WiFi link 5100AGN + Bluetooth	✓	✓	
Broadband wireless	dv4tse	dv4t	dv4z
Verizon Wireless V740 ExpressCard (service activation required)	✓	✓	✓
Verizon HP ev2210 1×EV-DO Rev A broadband wireless module (service activation required)	✓	✓	
AT&T HP ev2210 1×EV-DO Rev A broadband wireless module (service activation required)	✓	✓	
Hard drive	dv4tse	dv4t	dv4z
(5400 rpm SATA)			
160GB + HP ProtectSmart	✓	✓	✓
250GB + HP ProtectSmart	✓	✓	✓
320GB + HP ProtectSmart	✓	✓	✓
400GB + HP ProtectSmart	✓	✓	✓
(7200 rpm SATA)			
160GB + HP ProtectSmart		✓	
250GB + HP ProtectSmart		✓	
320GB + HP ProtectSmart		✓	
500GB + HP ProtectSmart		✓	
Primary CD/DVD drive	dv4tse	dv4t	dv4z
SuperMulti 8× DVD+/-R/RW with double-layer support	✓	✓	✓
LightScribe SuperMulti 8× DVD+/-RW with double-layer support	✓	✓	✓
Blu-ray ROM + SuperMulti DVD+/-R/RW with double-layer support	✓	✓	✓
LightScribe Blu-ray ROM + SuperMulti; DVD+/-R/RW with double-layer support	✓	✓	
TV & entertainment experience	dv4tse	dv4t	dv4z
No TV tuner w/remote control	✓	✓	✓
HP integrated HDTV hybrid tuner	✓	✓	
Primary battery (lithium ion battery)	dv4tse	dv4t	dv4z
6-cell	✓	✓	✓
High capacity 6-cell	✓	✓	✓
12-cell	✓	✓	✓
Keyboard	dv4tse	dv4t	dv4z
HP color-matching keyboard	✓	✓	✓
