= ExpressCard =

Specification for expansion and memory cards

- Year created: 2003
- Supersedes: PC Card
- No. of devices: 1 per slot
- Speed: 480 Mbit/s effective (USB 2 mode); 1.6 Gbit/s effective (PCIe 1 mode); 3.2 Gbit/s effective (PCIe 2 or USB 3 mode)
- Style: Serial
- Hotplugging interface: Yes
- External interface: Yes

ExpressCard, initially called NEWCARD, is an interface to connect peripheral devices to a computer, usually a laptop computer. The ExpressCard technical standard specifies the design of slots built into the computer and of expansion cards to insert in the slots. The cards contain electronic circuits and sometimes connectors for external devices. The ExpressCard standard replaces the PC Card (also known as PCMCIA) standards.

ExpressCards can connect a variety of devices to a computer including mobile broadband modems (sometimes called connect cards), IEEE 1394 (FireWire) connectors, USB connectors, Ethernet network ports, Serial ATA storage devices, solid-state drives, external enclosures for desktop-size PCI Express graphics cards and other peripheral devices, wireless network interface controllers (NIC), TV tuner cards, Common Access Card (CAC) readers, and sound cards.

== Standards ==
Originally developed by the Personal Computer Memory Card International Association (PCMCIA), the ExpressCard standard is maintained by the USB Implementers Forum (USB-IF). The host device supports PCI Express, USB 2.0 (including Hi-Speed), and USB 3.0 (SuperSpeed) (ExpressCard 2.0 only) connectivity through the ExpressCard slot; cards can be designed to use any of these modes. The cards are hot-pluggable. The ExpressCard standard is an open standard by ITU-T definition, and can be obtained from the USB-IF website free of charge.

USB-IF administers the ExpressCard Compliance Program, under which companies earn the right to obtain a license to use the ExpressCard logo on their compliant products.

== Form factors ==
ExpressCards compared to the predecessor PC Card

The ExpressCard standard specifies two form factors, ExpressCard/34 (34 millimetres (1.3 in) wide) and ExpressCard/54 (54 mm (2.1 in) wide, in an L-shape)—the connector is the same on both (34 mm wide). Standard cards are 75 mm (3.0 in) long (10.6 mm (0.42 in) shorter than CardBus) and 5 mm (0.20 in) thick, but may be thicker on sections that extend outside the standard form for antennas, sockets, etc. With its 75 mm standard length, the ExpressCard will protrude 5 mm over the holder's surface (e.g. laptop surface), whereas a variant with 70 mm length remains level with the surface.

== Comparison to other standards ==
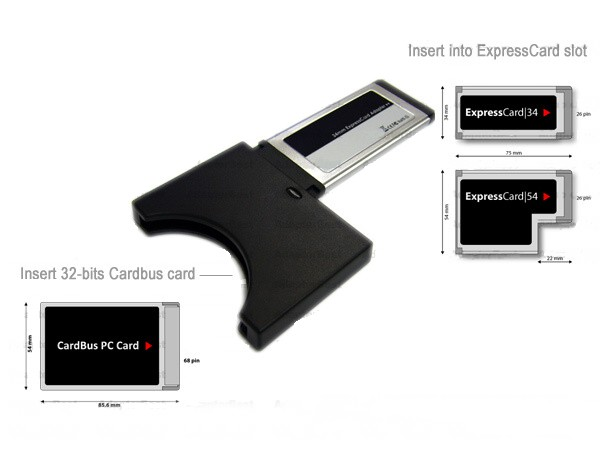
Cardbus to ExpressCard Adapter

The older PC Cards came in 16-bit and the later 32-bit CardBus designs. The major benefit of the ExpressCard over the PC card is more bandwidth, due to the ExpressCard's direct connection to the system bus over a PCI Express ×1 lane and USB 2.0, while CardBus cards only interface with PCI. The ExpressCard has a maximum throughput of 2.5 Gbit/s through PCI Express and 480 Mbit/s through USB 2.0 dedicated for each slot, while all CardBus and PCI devices connected to a computer usually share a total 1.06 Gbit/s bandwidth.

The ExpressCard standard specifies voltages of either 1.5 V or 3.3 V; CardBus slots can use 3.3 V or 5.0 V. The ExpressCard FAQ claims lower cost, better scalability, and better integration with motherboard chipset technology than Cardbus. PCMCIA devices can be connected to an ExpressCard slot via an adapter.

When the PC Card was introduced, the only other way to connect peripherals to a laptop computer was via RS-232 and parallel ports of limited performance, so it was widely adopted for many peripherals. More recently, virtually all laptop equipment has 480 Mbit/s Hi-Speed USB 2.0 ports, and most types of peripheral which formerly used a PC Card connection are available for USB or are built-in, making the ExpressCard less necessary than the PC Card was in its day. Many laptop computers do not have an ExpressCard slot.

== Availability ==
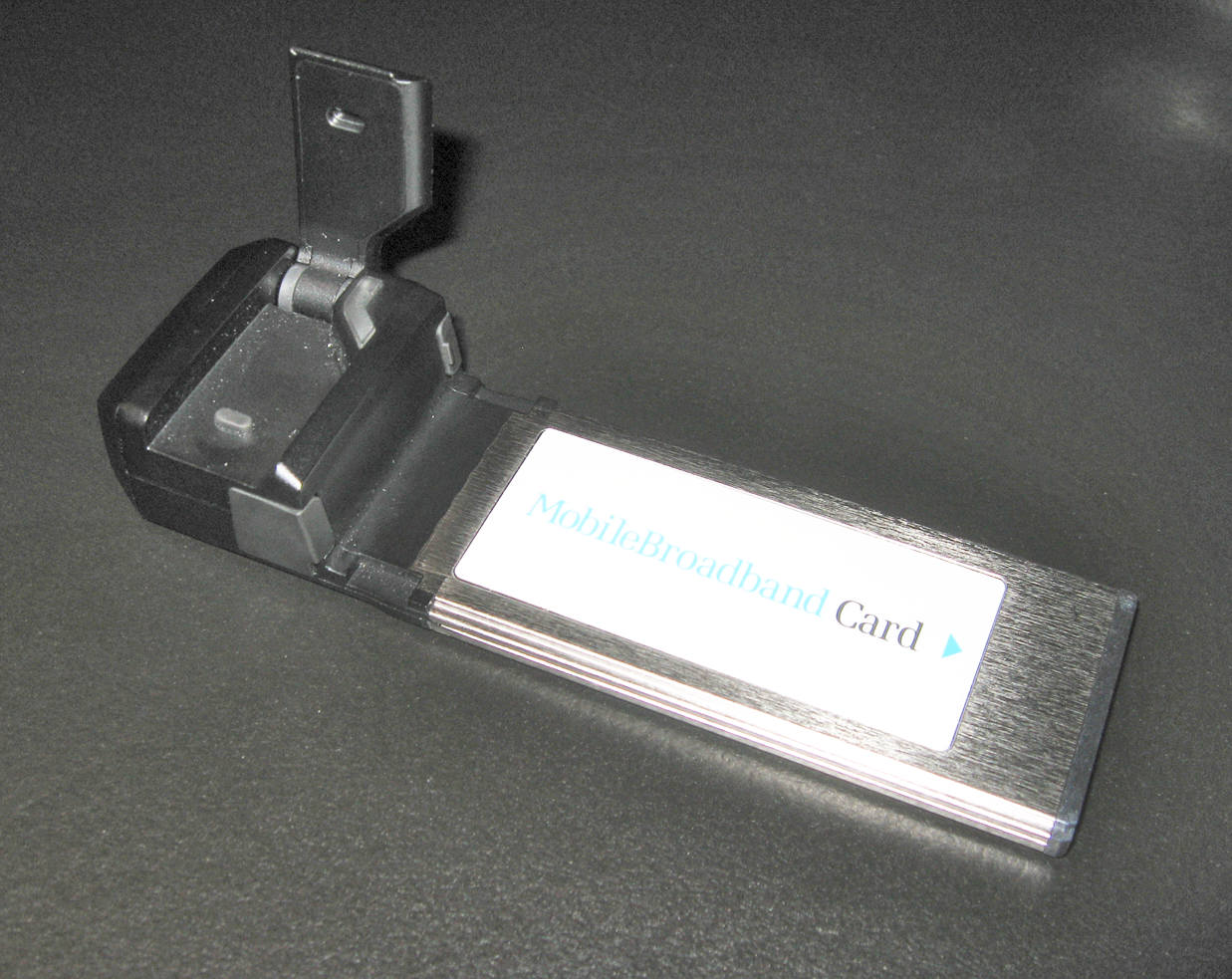
A mobile broadband modem integrated into ExpressCard 34

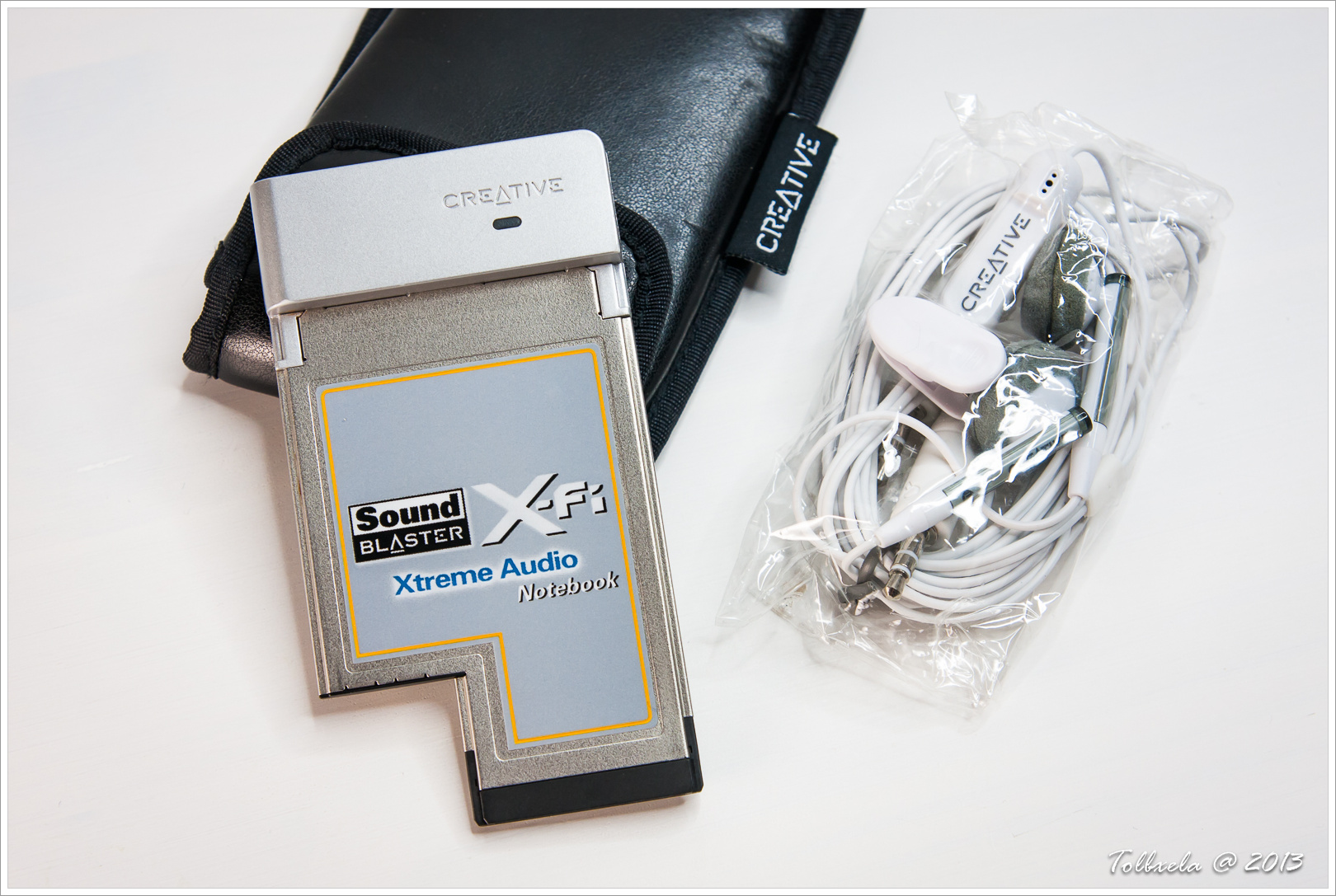
Sound Blaster X-Fi Xtreme Audio Notebook (ExpressCard/54)

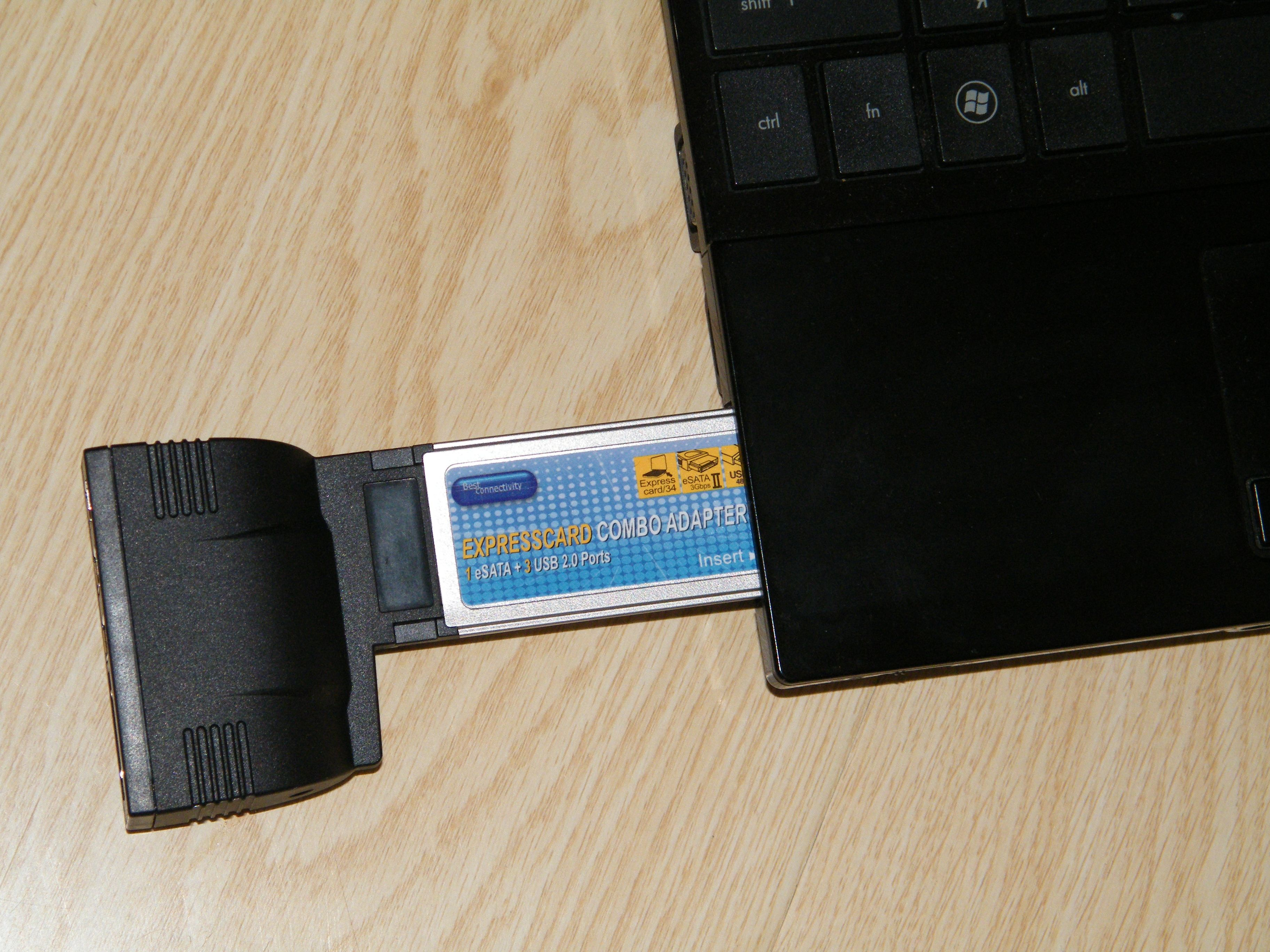
An ExpressCard partially inserted in a laptop

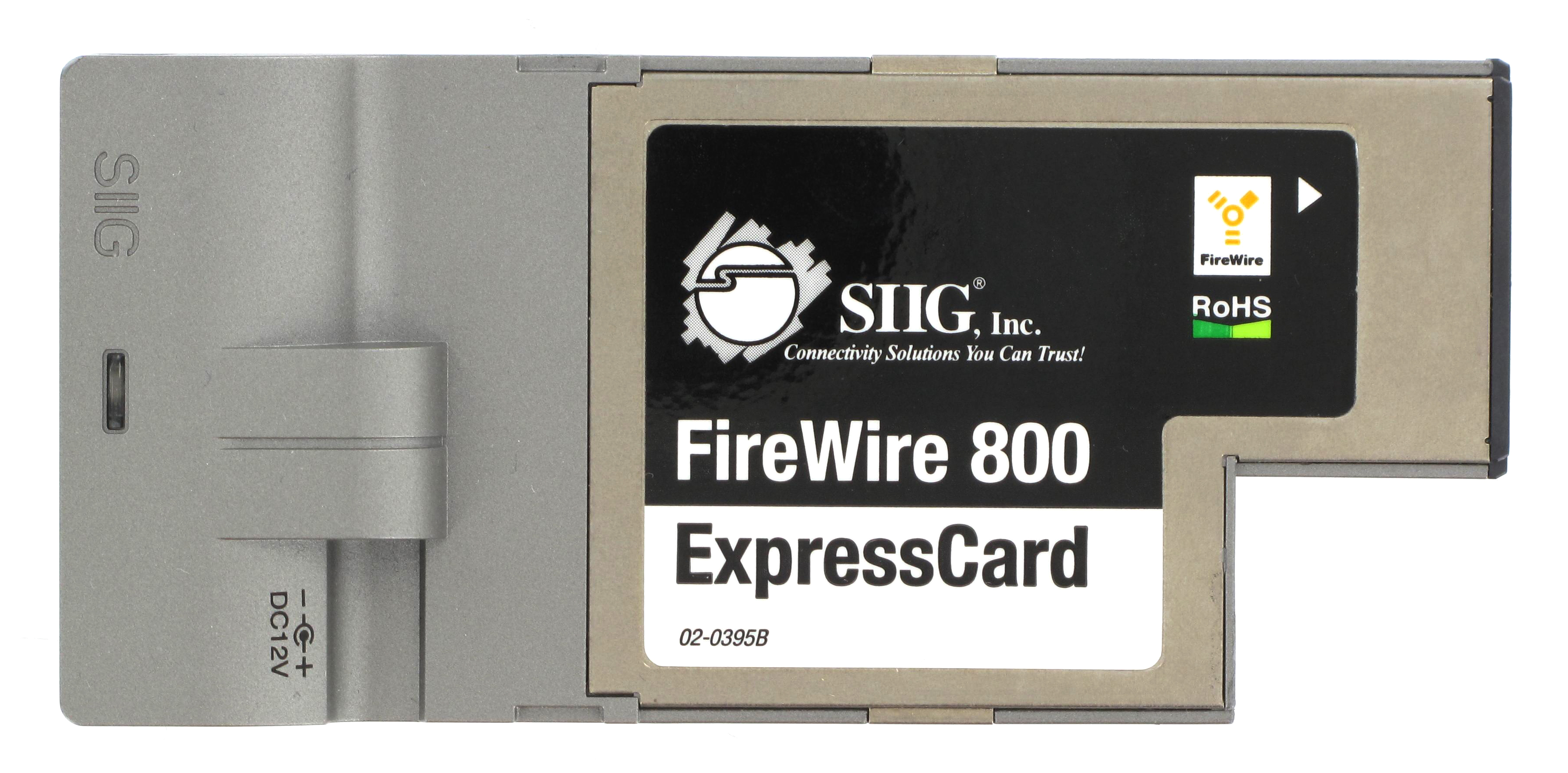
A FireWire 800 ExpressCard

An ExpressCard slot was commonly included on high-end laptops from the mid 2000s to the early 2010s:

- Hewlett-Packard began shipping systems with ExpressCard in November 2004.
- Lenovo integrated the slot into their flagship ThinkPad T43 in May 2005.
- Dell Computer also incorporates this in their Precision (the 17 in models have them exclusively, the 15 in Precisions have both express card and PCMCIA Card slots), Inspiron, Latitude (Latitude D-series have PCMCIA card slots. The D820/D830 have both ExpressCard and PCMCIA card slots. Latitude E-Series 6000 have ExpressCard|34 slots), Studio, Vostro and XPS Laptop product lines.
- Fujitsu-Siemens began shipping systems with ExpressCard in mid-2005.
- Apple Inc. included single ExpressCard/34 slots in every MacBook Pro notebook computer from January 2006 through June 2009. At the June 8, 2009 Apple Worldwide Developers Conference the company announced that the 15-inch and 13-inch MacBook Pro models would replace the ExpressCard slot with a Secure Digital card slot, while retaining the ExpressCard slot on the 17-inch model. In June 2012 Apple discontinued the 17-inch model and no further Macbooks have offered an ExpressCard slot.
- As of 2006, ASUS had also replaced the PC Card slot with an ExpressCard slot on many of its new models.
- Sony also began shipping systems with ExpressCard with its new laptop VGN-C, VGN-SZ, VGN-NS, VPC and FW product line.
- The Acer Aspire laptop series also had a single ExpressCard/54 slot on most new models.
- As of 2007, Panasonic incorporated ExpressCard/54 slots in all the fully rugged and semi-rugged models of their Toughbook brand of laptop computers.
- As of 2007, Gateway notebooks (ML3109 and later) also shipped with ExpressCard/54 interfaces.

Because of the lack of backward compatibility, some laptop manufacturers initially released models incorporating both CardBus (PCMCIA, PC Card) and ExpressCard slots. These included certain models of Acer Aspire, Acer Extensa, Toshiba Satellite, Dell Latitude and Precision, MSI S42x and Lenovo ThinkPad Z60m, R52, T60, R61 and T61.

In March 2005, the Personal Computer Memory Card International Association (PCMCIA) showed some of the first ExpressCard products at the CeBIT trade show in Germany. A large number of ExpressCard devices were presented.

In November 2006, Belkin announced that it was launching the first ExpressCard docking station, which uses the PCIe part of an ExpressCard connection to enable 1600x1200 video and the USB part to provide USB, audio and network ports. This points to the ability for ExpressCard to allow more capable non-OEM docking stations for laptop computers.

In 2007, Sony introduced its Vaio TZ model, which incorporates ExpressCards. Also the Sony Vaio FZ and Vaio Z series have the ExpressCard/34 Slot integrated in them. Sony also uses the ExpressCard/34 form factor for the flash memory modules in its XDCAM EX/SxS based camcorders, making the copying of video data between these cameras and ExpressCard-equipped laptops easier. For this reason, Sony also offers a USB-based SxS reader for desktop computers.

The Toshiba Satellite P and X 200/205 series of laptops and desktop replacements have an ExpressCard/34 slot since April 2007. In P200 series it's a /54 size not /34.

Ever since PCMCIA disbanded in 2009, newer laptops from 2010 on more commonly do not include ExpressCard slots except for some business-oriented models (e.g. some Lenovo models use it for supporting a smart card reader). For WWAN connectivity cards, either mini-PCIe slots or USB connected variants have become the preferred connection methods. For external desktop graphics card enclosures and other peripherals that interface with PCI Express, Thunderbolt has supplanted ExpressCard in that role due to its faster speed and ability to use multiple PCIe 2.0 lanes; the first and second Thunderbolt revisions offered 20 Gbit/s of maximum bandwidth with four PCIe 2.0 lanes while ExpressCard could only muster 5 Gbit/s maximum with one PCIe 2.0 lane.

== ExpressCard 2.0 ==
The ExpressCard 2.0 standard was introduced on March 4, 2009, at CeBIT in Hannover. It provides a single PCIe 1.0 2.5 GT/s lane (optionally PCIe 2.0 with 5 GT/s) and a USB 3.0 "SuperSpeed" link with a raw transfer speed of 5 Gbit/s (effective transfer speed up to 400 MB/s). It is forward and backward compatible with earlier ExpressCard modules and slots. USB 3.0 SuperSpeed compatibility is achieved by sharing the pins with the PCIe link. An inserted card signals which mode should be used.

The standard failed to gain widespread use and some Taiwanese manufacturers discontinued it as early as 2011. After the dissolution of the PCMCIA in 2010, the specification, associated documentation and licensing responsibilities were moved to the USB Implementers Forum. The specifications were last revised in 2009, and removed from their website in 2018.

== See also ==
- List of interface bit rates
