= HP Pavilion dv5 =

Series of laptop computers

HP Pavilion dv5 series
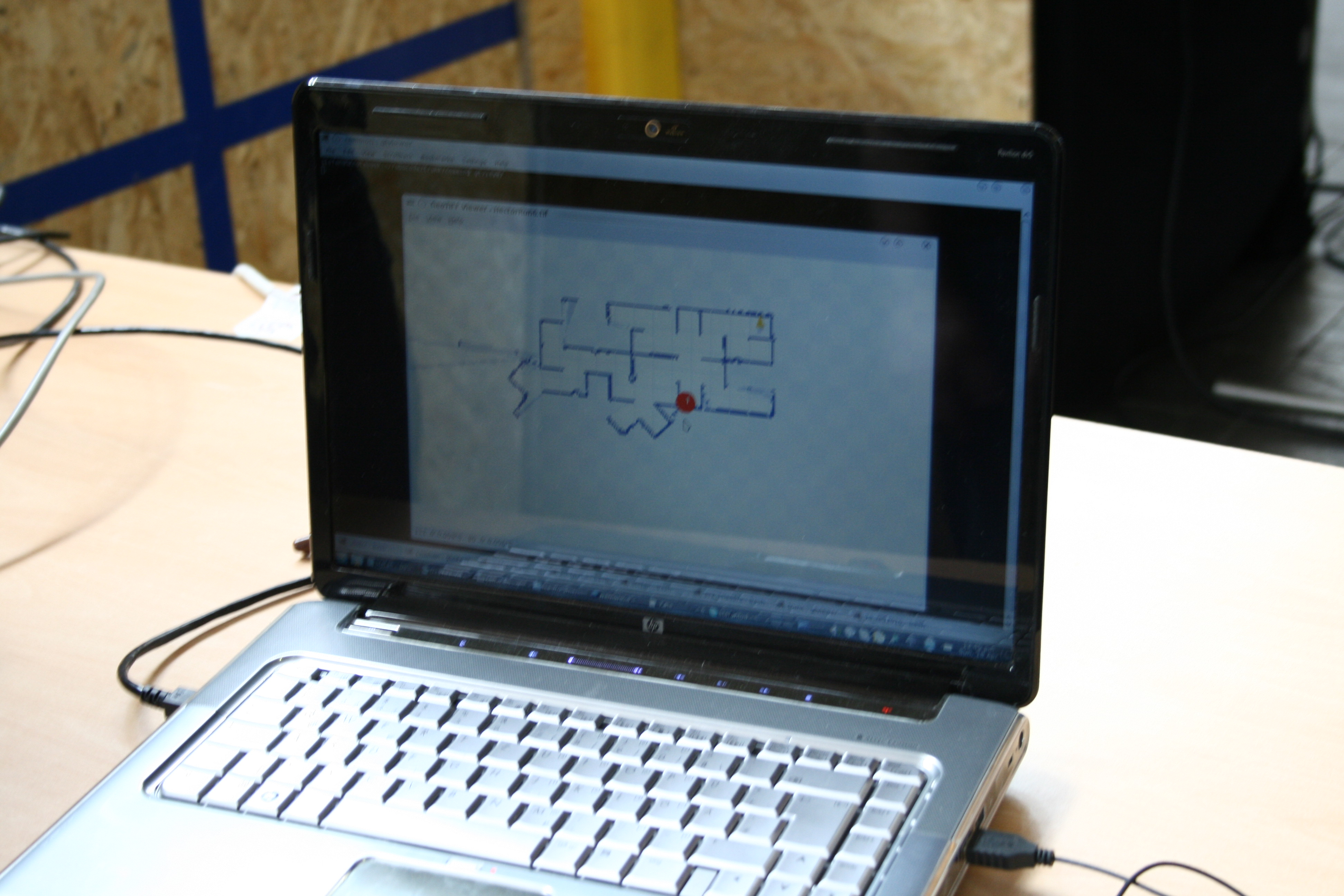
- Developer: Hewlett-Packard (HP Inc.)
- Type: Laptop/notebook
- Released: 2008; 2010
- Display: 15.4" or 14.5" 16:9
- Predecessor: HP Pavilion dv6000 series
- Successor: HP Envy dv5; HP Pavilion (?)
- Related: HP Pavilion: dv7 (17"), dv6 (15+"), dv4 (14"), dv2 (12") series

The HP Pavilion dv5 was a model series of laptop/mobile computers manufactured by Hewlett-Packard Company that features a 15.4" diagonal display. The HP Pavilion dv4 features a 14.1" and the HP Pavilion dv7 a 17" display. The dv5 series has been discontinued, being partially replaced by the dv6 (16") series, and released again as a 14.5" model in 2010. The laptop was announced in June 2008 and was officially released to the market in July 2008. There were also a few special edition versions of this model, like the Renewal Imprint finish special edition, that released on October 3, 2008.

== Models ==
- dv5se (Special Edition) - features the Renewal Imprint finish
- dv5t - uses an Intel processor
- dv5z - uses an AMD processor

== Weight and dimensions ==
| | dv5tse | dv5t | dv5z |
|---|---|---|---|
| Weight (with standard battery) | 5.83 lb (2.64 kg) | 5.83 lb (2.64 kg) | 5.84 lb (2.65 kg) |
| Width (left to right) | 14.05 in. | 14.05 in. | 14.05 in. |
| Depth (front to back) | 10.20 in. | 10.20 in. | 10.20 in. |
| Height (max) (thickness) | 1.65 in. | 1.65 in. | 1.65 in. |
| Height (min) (thickness) | 1.37 in. | 1.37 in. | 1.37 in. |

Note: Weight varies by configuration.

== Customizable features ==
The following are customizable features only available in the United States (HP CTO Notebooks). Information retrieved from the HP store website, November 2008.

| Color | dv5tse | dv5t | dv5z |
| Onyx | | ✓ | ✓ |
| Bronze | | ✓ | ✓ |
| Renewal | ✓ | | |
| Operating system | dv5tse | dv5t | dv5z |
| Windows Vista Home Basic 32-Bit | | | |
| Windows Vista Home Premium 32-Bit | ✓ | ✓ | ✓ |
| Windows Vista Home Premium 64-Bit | | ✓ | ✓ |
| Windows Vista Business 32-Bit | ✓ | ✓ | ✓ |
| Windows Vista Ultimate 64-Bit | | ✓ | ✓ |
| Windows 7 Home Basic 32-Bit | ✓ | ✓ | ✓ |
| Windows 7 Home Basic 64-Bit | | ✓ | ✓ |
| Windows 7 Home Premium 32-Bit | | ✓ | ✓ |
| Windows 7 Home Premium 64-Bit | | | ✓ |
| Windows 7 Professional 32-Bit | ✓ | | ✓ |
| Windows 7 Professional 64-Bit | | ✓ | ✓ |
| Windows 7 Ultimate 32-bit | ✓ | ✓ | ✓ |
| Windows 7 Ultimate 64-bit | | | ✓ |
| Processors (AMD) | dv5tse | dv5t | dv5z |
| (AMD Athlon 64 X2) | | | |
| QL-60 (1.9GHz, 1MB (1 L2 cache) | | | ✓ |
| RM-70 (2.0GHz, 1MB L2 cache) | | | ✓ |
| RM-72 (2.1GHz, 1MB L2 cache) | | | ✓ |
| ZM-82 (2.2GHz, 2MB L2 cache) | | | ✓ |
| ZM-84 (2.3GHz, 2MB L2 cache) | | | ✓ |
| Processors (Intel) | dv5tse | dv5t | dv5z |
| (Intel Pentium Dual-Core) | | | |
| T3200 (2.0GHz, 1MB L2 cache, 667MHz FSB) | | ✓ | |
| (Intel Core 2 Duo) | | | |
| T5800 (2.0GHz, 2MB L2 cache, 800MHz FSB) | ✓ | ✓ | |
| P7350 (2.0GHz, 3MB L2 cache, 1066MHz FSB) | ✓ | ✓ | |
| P8400 (2.26GHz, 3MB L2 cache, 1066MHz FSB) | ✓ | ✓ | |
| P8600 (2.40GHz, 3MB L2 cache, 1066MHz FSB) | | ✓ | |
| T9400 (2.53GHz, 6MB L2 cache, 1066MHz FSB) | ✓ | ✓ | |
| T9600 (2.80GHz, 6MB L2 cache, 1066MHz FSB) | ✓ | ✓ | |
| Display | dv5tse | dv5t | dv5z |
| (HP BrightView high-definition widescreen) | | | |
| 15.4" WXGA (1280 × 800) display | | ✓ | ✓ |
| 15.4" WXGA (1280 × 800) infinity display | ✓ | ✓ | ✓ |
| 15.4" WSXGA+ (1680 × 1050) display | | ✓ | ✓ |
| 15.4" WSXGA+ (1680 × 1050) infinity display | ✓ | ✓ | ✓ |
| Memory (DDR2 system memory (2 Dimm)) | dv5tse | dv5t | dv5z |
| 1GB | | ✓ | ✓ |
| 2GB | ✓ | ✓ | ✓ |
| 3GB | ✓ | ✓ | ✓ |
| 4GB | ✓ | ✓ | ✓ |
| Graphics card | dv5tse | dv5t | dv5z |
| Intel GMA 4500MHD | ✓ | ✓ | |
| ATI Radeon HD 4500 (3GB) | | | ✓ |
| ATI Radeon HD 3450 (256MB) | | | ✓ |
| ATI Radeon HD 3450 (512MB) | | | ✓ |
| NVIDIA GeForce 9200M GS (256MB) | | ✓ | |
| NVIDIA GeForce 9600M GT (512MB) | | ✓ | |
| Personalization | dv5tse | dv5t | dv5z |
| Webcam only | | ✓ | ✓ |
| Webcam only (infinity display) | ✓ | ✓ | ✓ |
| Webcam + fingerprint reader | | ✓ | ✓ |
| Webcam + fingerprint reader (infinity display) | | ✓ | ✓ |
| Networking | dv5tse | dv5t | dv5z |
| 802.11b/g WLAN | ✓ | ✓ | ✓ |
| 802.11b/g WLAN + Bluetooth | ✓ | ✓ | ✓ |
| 802.11a/b/g/n WLAN | | | ✓ |
| 802.11a/b/g/n WLAN + Bluetooth | | | ✓ |
| Intel WiFi link 5100AGN | ✓ | ✓ | |
| Intel WiFi link 5100AGN + Bluetooth | ✓ | ✓ | |
| 56K dialup modem | ✓ | ✓ | ✓ |
| No dialup modem | ✓ | ✓ | ✓ |
| Broadband wireless | dv5tse | dv5t | dv5z |
| Verizon Wireless V740 ExpressCard (service activation required) | ✓ | | |
| Hard drive | dv5tse | dv5t | dv5z |
| (5400 rpm SATA) | | | |
| 160GB + HP ProtectSmart | ✓ | ✓ | ✓ |
| 250GB + HP ProtectSmart | ✓ | ✓ | ✓ |
| 320GB + HP ProtectSmart | ✓ | ✓ | ✓ |
| 400GB + HP ProtectSmart | ✓ | ✓ | ✓ |
| Primary CD/DVD drive | dv5tse | dv5t | dv5z |
| SuperMulti 8× DVD+/-R/RW with double layer support | ✓ | ✓ | ✓ |
| LightScribe SuperMulti 8× DVD+/-RW with double layer support | ✓ | ✓ | ✓ |
| Blu-ray ROM + SuperMulti DVD+/-R/RW with double layer support | ✓ | ✓ | ✓ |
| LightScribe Blu-ray ROM + SuperMulti; DVD+/-R/RW with double layer support | ✓ | ✓ | |
| TV & entertainment experience | dv5tse | dv5t | dv5z |
| No TV tuner w/remote control | ✓ | ✓ | ✓ |
| HP integrated HDTV hybrid tuner | ✓ | ✓ | |
| Primary battery (lithium ion battery) | dv5tse | dv5t | dv5z |
| 6 cell | ✓ | ✓ | ✓ |
| High capacity 6 cell | ✓ | ✓ | ✓ |
| 12 cell | ✓ | ✓ | ✓ |
| Keyboard | dv5tse | dv5t | dv5z |
| HP color matching keyboard | ✓ | ✓ | ✓ |
