= Quickplay =

Quickplay is a style of play in video games (or other entertainment media) where a player can play a game quickly.

It may also refer to:

- Quickplay Media, a Canada-based software and platform provider
- QuickPlay, a specialized feature on HP Pavilion computers

== See also ==
- All pages containing Quickplay
- Quick time
