= HP Essential =

HP desktop and laptop product range

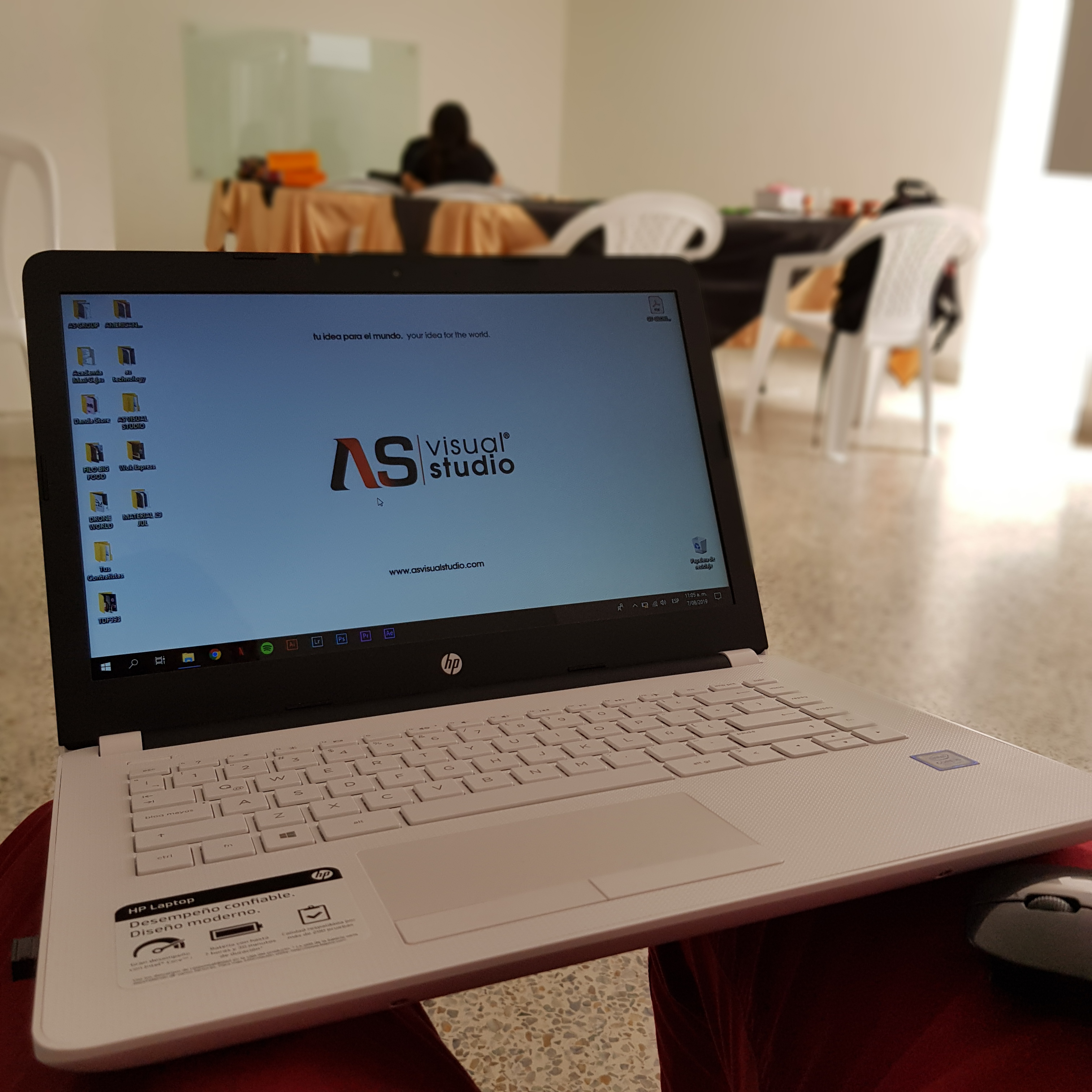
- An "HP Laptop" branded laptop
- Also known as: HP Desktop; HP All-In-One; HP Notebook; HP Laptop
- Developer: Hewlett-Packard (2009–2015); HP Inc. (2015–present)
- Manufacturer: Hewlett-Packard (2009–2015); HP Inc. (2015–present)
- Type: Personal computers
- Released: 2009; 17 years ago
- Operating system: Windows
- CPU: AMD, Intel
- Graphics: AMD, Nvidia, Intel
- Marketing target: Consumer
- Related: HP Pavilion, HP Envy, HP Spectre, HP TouchSmart, HP Stream, HP Chromebook
- Website: HP Store - HP Essential Desktops; HP Store - HP Essential Laptops

HP Essential is a trademark name used by Hewlett-Packard and later by its successor, HP Inc. to denote their own line of entry-level, inexpensive desktops and laptops produced since 2009.

Products under the "Essential" moniker include the HP Desktop, HP All-In-One, HP Laptop and HP Notebook series, as well as products simply branded as "HP". A similar line called HP Stream consisted of low-end consumer-oriented laptops and tablets. All HP Essential products primarily use the Microsoft Windows operating system, with some other operating systems offered on some models.

As of 2026, the HP Essential line is currently being supplanted by the HP OmniBook 3 series of the AI-powered Omni brand (consisting of the OmniBook (a 2024 revival of a 1993–2002 brand), OmniDesk, and OmniStudio brands) due to a corporate streamlining of products that was previously announced in 2024.

== Models ==
Several different models of desktops, all-in-ones, and laptops under the HP Essential brand have been produced. As of 2026, 15 all-in-one models (including seven AI-powered models) and 48 laptop models in the HP Laptop, HP Notebook and HP series (including 8 AI-powered models) are currently offered.

The HP Essential all-in-ones and laptops are only customizable in the United States. A variety of preconfigured models with different setups are available in other countries.

=== HP All-In-One ===
Certain all-in-one models include artificial intelligence technologies, and are branded as "AI PC" or "Copilot+PC".

- HP All-In-One 27 (Intel Core Ultra 5 / Intel Core Ultra 7)
- HP All-In-One 24 (Intel Core Ultra 5 / Intel Core Ultra 7)
- HP All-In-One 22 (Intel N200)

=== HP Laptop ===
- HP Laptop 17t (Intel N200, Intel Core i5/5, Intel Core i7/7)
- HP Laptop 17z (AMD Athlon Gold, AMD Ryzen 5, AMD Ryzen 7)
- HP Laptop 15t (Intel Core i5/5, Intel Core Ultra 5, Intel Core i7/7)
- HP Laptop 15z (AMD Athlon Silver, AMD Ryzen 5)
- HP Laptop 14t (Intel Celeron, Intel N200, Intel Core i3/3, Intel Core i5/5, Intel Core Ultra 5)
- HP Laptop 14z (AMD Athlon Silver, AMD Ryzen 5)

==== HP Laptop AI ====
HP Laptop models featuring artificial intelligence technologies.

- HP Laptop AI 17 (Intel Core Ultra 5 / Intel Core Ultra 7)
- HP Laptop AI 15 (Intel Core Ultra 5 / Intel Core Ultra 7)
- HP Laptop AI 14 (Intel Core Ultra 5)

=== HP Notebook ===
- HP Notebook 15 (2020) (AMD A6)
- HP Notebook 15 (2016) (Intel Core i5)

=== HP ===
==== 200 series ====
HP 250 is a budget laptop from HP. It has 11 generations (as of 2025), from G1 (2013) to G11 (2024). It uses Celeron, Pentium, or Intel Core i3 or i5 processors.

HP 255 notebook is a budget laptop. The latest (as of 2025) tenth generation model (G10) is equipped with AMD Ryzen 3, 5 or 7 mobile processors.

==== 300 series ====
HP 340S notebook comes with a choice of Intel Core i3, i5, and i7 processors.

==== 400 series ====
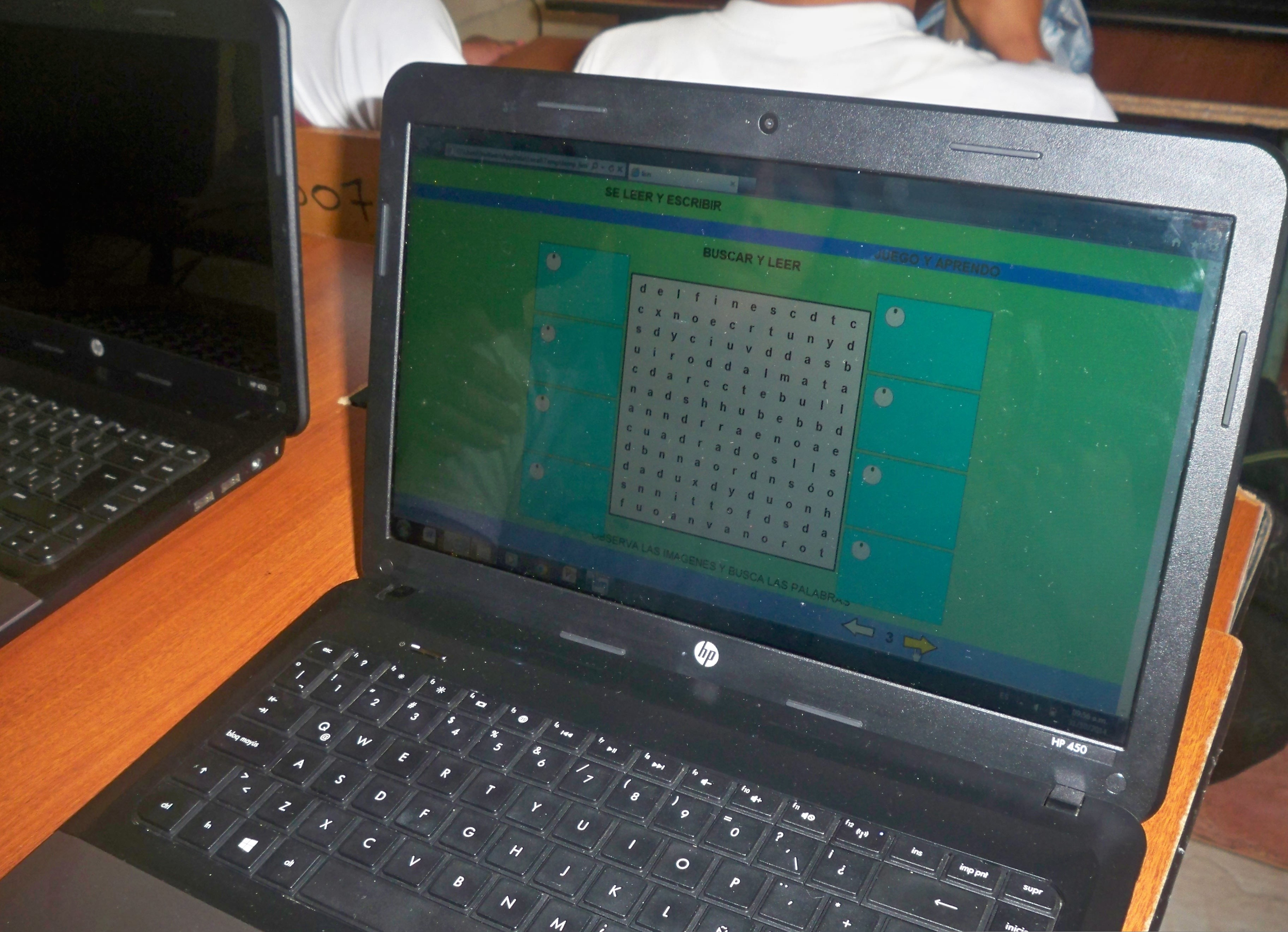
HP 450 notebook

HP 450 notebook comes in a choice of Intel Celeron, Intel Pentium, and Intel Core i3.

==== 500 series ====
HP 520 notebook, a low-end business laptop with either Core Duo T2400 or other Celeron M processors, and either with Windows Vista Business or Basic preinstalled, or if chosen, Red Hat 10.

==== 600 series ====
HP 620 notebook from 2010 featured a dual-core Intel Pentium CPU.

HP 630 was released in 2011 with a Intel Pentium P6200 dual-core processor. The HP 635 instead had an AMD Zacate E-350.

== HP Stream series ==
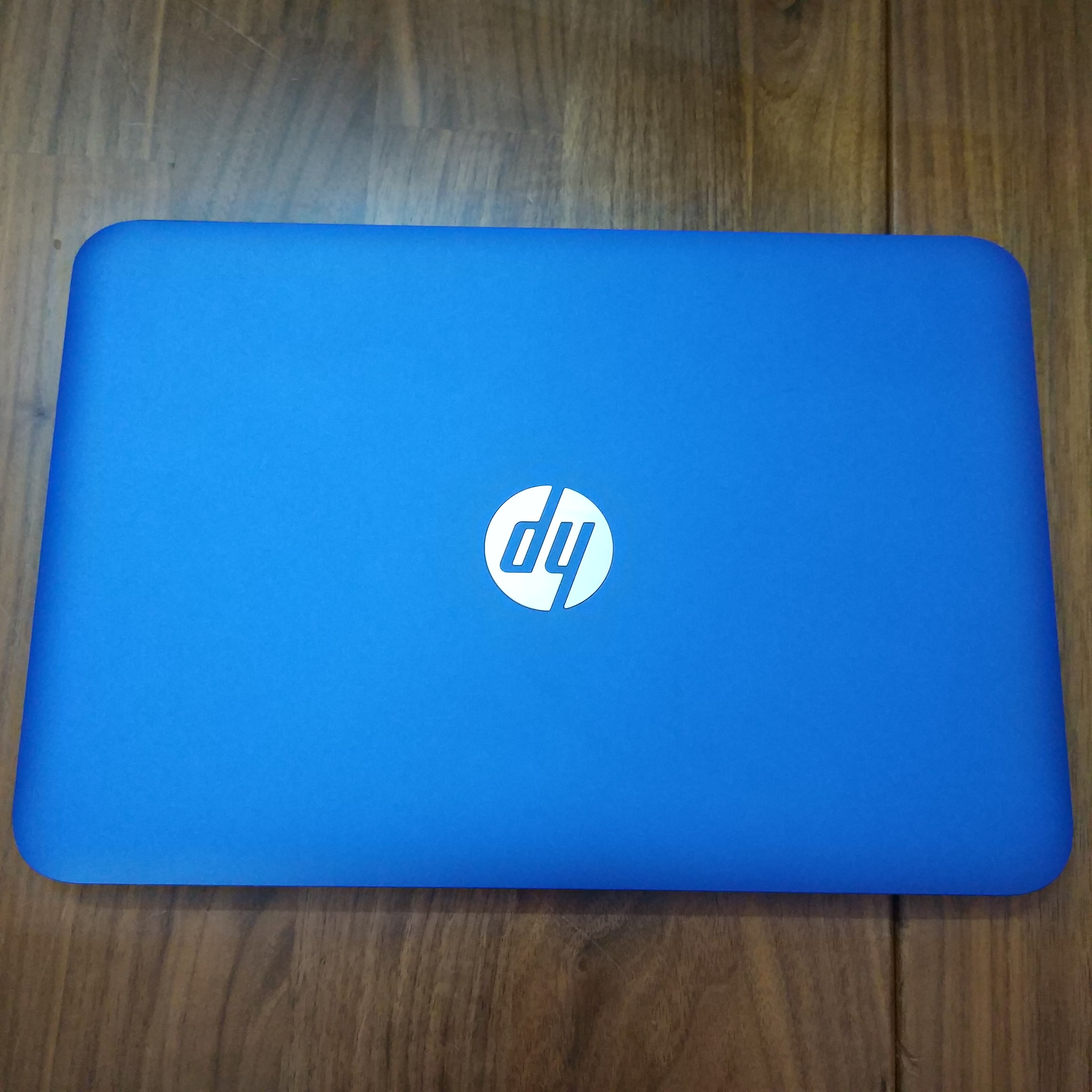
An HP Stream 11

The HP Stream series was first introduced in November 2014.

=== Laptops ===
==== HP Stream 11 ====
The 11-inch model was released in November 2014 as a Chromebook killer. It uses an Intel Celeron N2840 CPU with Intel HD Graphics, and weighs 2.74 pounds (1.24 kg). The ports included on this device is two USB-A (one 3.0, one 2.0), HDMI, SD card, and a 3.5mm headphone jack.

==== HP Stream 11 Pro ====
The first generation of Stream 11 Pro was introduced in January 2015, with the same 1366x768 11.6-inch display as Stream 11, but with a different keyboard.

Since then, more generations of the 11 Pro have been released: G1 (2015); G2 (2015); G3 (2017); G4 (2017); G5 (2020)

==== HP Stream 13 ====
The first HP Stream 13 came with a 2.16 GHz Intel Celeron N2480 processor and Intel HD graphics, retailing for $230.

==== HP Stream 14 ====
HP Stream 14 came out in 2014 with a AMD A4 Micro-6400T APU (model no. series 14-Z0).

An updated version came in 2016 (model no. series 14-AX, 14-CB?) with 1.6 GHz Intel Celeron N3060.

Another Stream 14 revision (model no. series 14-DS) was released in 2020.

==== HP Stream x360 ====
The Stream x360 is a 2-in-1 convertible that came in 11.6" (model. 11-P0) and 13.3" variants when released in 2015. It had a Intel Celeron dual-core 2.16 GHz N2840 chip with 2 GB of RAM.

A second generation (11-AA) was released in 2016 with CPU upgraded to Celeron N3060.

=== Tablets ===
==== HP Stream 7 ====
The HP Stream 7 is a tablet computer that runs Microsoft Corporation's Windows operating system. It was announced on September 29, 2014.

==== HP Stream 8 ====
The HP Stream 8 is a tablet computer designed by Hewlett-Packard that runs Microsoft Corporation's Windows operating system.

=== First generation comparison ===
	Stream 10	Stream 11	Stream 11 Pro	Stream 13	Stream 14	Stream 14 Pro	Stream x360	Stream 7	Stream 8
Type	Laptop						2-in-1	Tablet	
Display	10" 1366x768	11.6" 1366x768		13" 1366x768	14.1" 1366x768		11.6" 1366x768	7" 1280×800	8" 1280×800
CPU	Intel Celeron		Intel Celeron N2840	Intel Celeron			Intel Celeron or Pentium	Intel Atom Z73735G	
Memory	4 GB							1 GB	
Storage	500 GB			1 TB			500 GB	32 GB	
HDMI ports	No	Yes						No	No
USB ports	USB	2x USB 3.0	1x USB 3.0	1x USB 3.0, 2x USB 2.0	1x USB 2.0, 2x USB 3.0			1x USB 2.0	1x USB 2.0
SD card slot	No	Yes						Yes	Yes
Ethernet port	No	No					Yes	No	No

== See also ==
- HP Slate
