= QuickPlayer =

QuickPlayer may refer to:

- QuickPlay by Hewlett-Packard
- QuickPlay by Quickplay Media
- QuickTime Player, part of QuickTime
