= Pedion =

Pedion may refer to:

- Pedion, a triclinic crystal form having a single face
- Mitsubishi Pedion, a subnotebook released in 1998
