= Chiclet keyboard =

Type of keyboard using flat keys separated by bezels

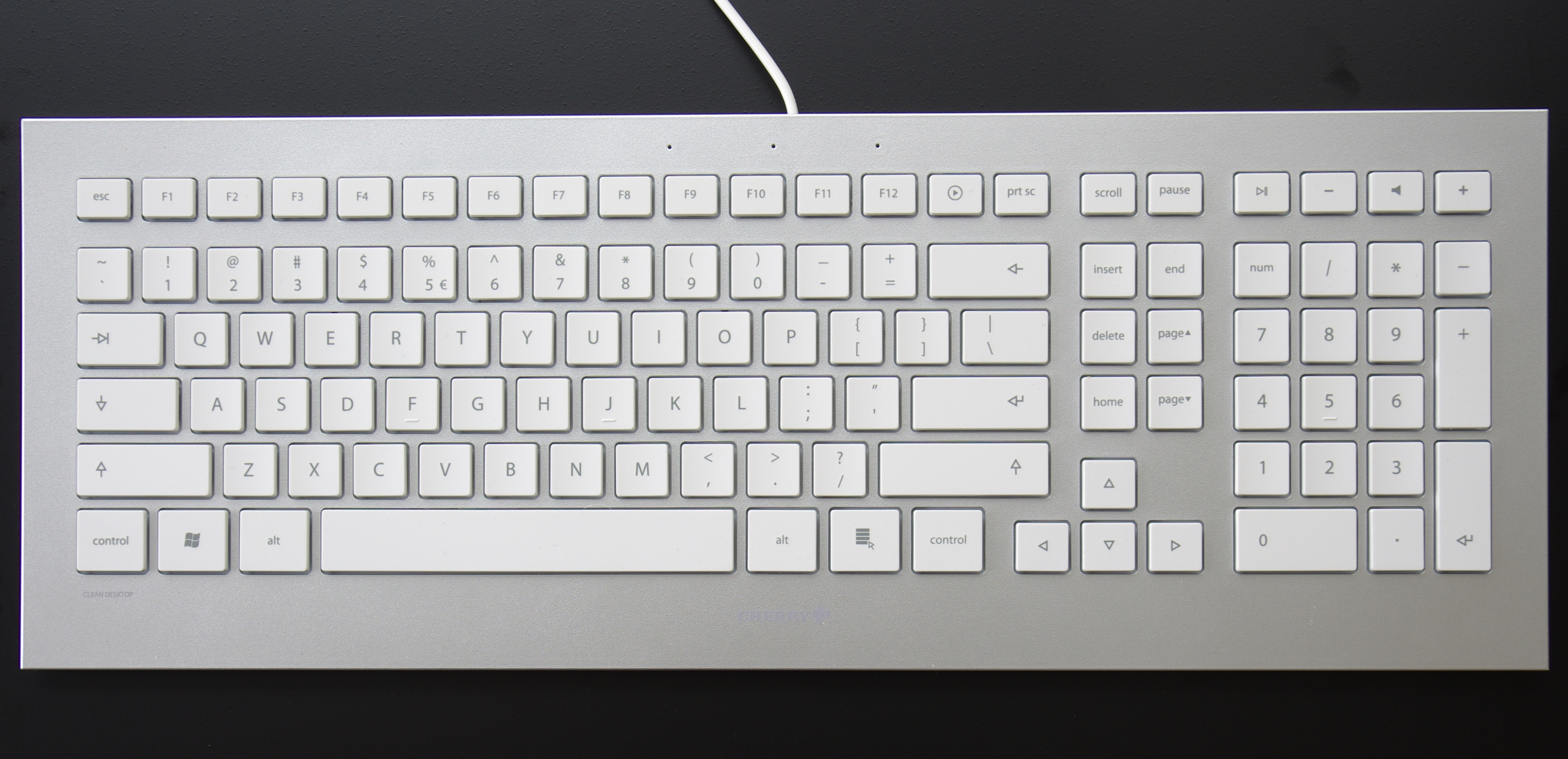
A white standard wired chiclet keyboard (flat keyboard)

A chiclet keyboard is a computer keyboard with keys that form an array of small, flat rectangular or lozenge-shaped rubber or plastic keys that look like erasers or "Chiclets", a brand of chewing gum manufactured in the shape of small squares with rounded corners. It is an evolution of the membrane keyboard, using the same principle of a single rubber sheet with individual electrical switches underneath each key, but with an additional upper layer which provides superior tactile feedback through a buckling mechanism. The term "chiclet keyboard" is sometimes incorrectly used to refer to island-style keyboards.

Since the mid-1980s, chiclet keyboards have been mainly restricted to lower-end electronics, such as small handheld calculators, cheap PDAs and many remote controls, though the name is also used to refer to scissor keyboards with superficially similar appearance.

== History ==
The term first appeared during the home computer era of the late 1970s to mid-1980s. The TRS-80 Color Computer, TRS-80 MC-10, and Timex Sinclair 2068 were all described as having "chiclet keys".

This style of keyboard has been met with poor reception, and especially derided by touch typists. John Dvorak wrote that it was "associated with $99 el cheapo computers". The keys on ZX Spectrum computers are "rubber dome keys" which were sometimes described as "dead flesh", while the feel of the IBM PCjr's chiclet keyboard was reportedly compared to "massaging fruit cake". Its quality was such that an amazed Tandy executive, whose company had previously released a computer with a similarly unpopular keyboard, asked "How could IBM have made that mistake with the PCjr?"

== Design ==
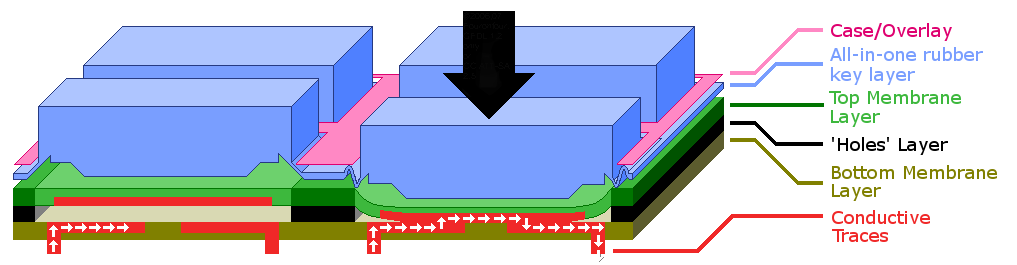
Stylised cross-section of a "rubber" Chiclet keyboard. Under the left key is air space (light grey), just below the upper red conductive layer. The thickness of the bottom three layers is exaggerated for clarity; in real-life they are not much thicker than paper. Note the distortion of the thin rubber where the right-hand key (pressed) joins the sheet. Some designs omit the top membrane (green) and hole (black) layers, instead coating the undersides of the keys themselves with conductive material (red).

Chiclet keyboards operate under essentially the same mechanism as in the membrane keyboard. In both cases, a keypress is registered when the top layer is forced through a hole to touch the bottom layer. For every key, the conductive traces on the bottom layer are normally separated by a non-conductive gap. Electrical current cannot flow between them; the switch is open. However, when pushed down, conductive material on the underside of the top layer bridges the gap between those traces; the switch is closed, current can flow, and a keypress is registered. All such keyboards are characterized by having each key surrounded (and held in place) by a perforated plate, so there is a space between the keys.

Unlike the membrane keyboard, where the user presses directly onto the top membrane layer, this form of chiclet keyboard places a set of moulded rubber keys above this. With some key designs, the user pushes the key, and under sufficient pressure the thin sides of the rubber key suddenly collapse. In other designs — such as that seen in the diagram — the deliberate weak point is where the key joins the rest of the sheet. The effect is similar in both cases. This collapse allows the solid rubber center to move downwards, forcing the top membrane layer against the bottom layer, and completing the circuit. The "sudden collapse" of the chiclet keyboard (along with the movement of the key) provides a greater tactile feedback to the user than a simple flat membrane keyboard.

Most often the tops of the keys were hard, but sometimes they were made of the same material as the rubber dome itself.

Other versions of the chiclet keyboard omit the upper membrane and hole/spacer layers; instead the underside of the rubber keys themselves have a conductive coating. When the key is pushed, the conductive underside makes contact with the traces on the bottom layer, and bridges the gap between them, thus completing the circuit. Grooves between hollow domes on the blue underside permit air to flow out of a dome when a key is pressed, and let air come back in when released.

The dome switch keyboards used with a large proportion of modern PCs are technically similar to chiclet keyboards. The rubber keys are replaced with rubber domes, and hard plastic keytops rest on top of these. Because the keytops are wider than the rubber domes, the keytops are not separated but align almost perfectly with only a minimal gap in between each other.

== Legacy ==
The term "chiclet" has also been used to describe low-profile, low-travel scissor keyboards with simplified, flat keycaps separated by a bezel. The first laptop to feature this style of chiclet keyboard was the Mitsubishi Pedion in 1997 (rebranded as the OmniBook Sojourn by Hewlett-Packard). Sony popularized the chiclet keyboard in laptops with the release of the Vaio X505 in 2004.

== Notable uses ==
All of the computers listed are from the early home computer era, except the OLPC XO-1.

- Atari Portfolio (its keys resemble those of an HP pocket calculator)
- Cambridge Z88 (arguably a mix between a membrane and chiclet keyboard)
- Commodore PET 2001 (the original 1977 PET) has the square keys of a calculator or cash register.
- Commodore 116 (version of the C16 sold only in Europe)
- Enterprise 64 (has a rubber keyboard, on top of which plastic keycaps were glued)
- IBM PCjr
- Jupiter Ace (Sinclair spectrum style black rubber keys)
- Mattel Aquarius (blue rubber keys)
- Microdigital TK 90X (Brazil ZX Spectrum derivation)
- Multitech Microprofessor I (MPF 1) and MPF II (the latter an early Apple II compatible)
- OLPC XO-1 (green rubber keys molded from a single sheet of rubber)
- Oric-1 (hard key tops glued on a rubber sheet, somewhat resembling the PCjr)
- Panasonic JR-200
- Spectravideo SV-318
- TRS-80 Color Computer I (later 'CoCo's have full-travel keyboards)
- TRS-80 MC-10 and its French counterpart, the Matra Alice
- TI-99/4 (predecessor of the TI-99/4A, which has a full-travel keyboard)
- Thomson MO5 (French microcomputer based on the 6809 microprocessor)
- Timex Sinclair 1500 (U.S. ZX81 derivation)
- Timex Sinclair 2068 (U.S. ZX Spectrum derivation)
- VTech Laser 200 (also known as the Video Technology VZ200)
- ZX Spectrum 16/48K (later models have slightly improved keyboards)
- Some early models of MSX computers, for example the Philips VG-8010
