= EVGA =

EVGA may refer to:

- Extended Video Graphics Array, a VESA standard for 1024x768 resolution
- EVGA Corporation, a Taiwanese computer hardware company
- Evga S.A, a Greek dairy company
