= HP OmniBook =

Line of laptops produced by Hewlett-Packard

- Developer: Hewlett-Packard (1993–2002); HP Inc. (2024–present)
- Manufacturer: Hewlett-Packard (1993–2002); HP Inc. (2024–present)
- Type: Laptop
- Released: June 1993; 33 years ago (original); May 2024; 2 years ago (current)
- Lifespan: 1993–2002 (original); 2024–present (current)
- Discontinued: May 2002; 24 years ago (original)
- Operating system: MS-DOS, Windows
- CPU: AMD, Intel, Qualcomm
- Graphics: AMD, Nvidia, Intel, Qualcomm
- Marketing target: Business (1993–2002); Consumer (2024–present)
- Predecessor: 1993 (original): Vectra LS; 2024 (current): Essential; Pavilion; Envy; Spectre
- Related: OmniDesk, OmniStudio

OmniBook is a line of laptops originally produced by Hewlett-Packard and later by its successor, HP Inc. Originally introduced in 1993, HP has used the name for business laptops from 1993 to 2002 and for consumer laptops featuring AI technology since 2024.

The OmniBook brand was initially discontinued after acquiring Compaq in 2002, only to return in 2024 as part of a restructuring plan that year to gradually succeed consumer-oriented brands such as the Spectre, Envy, Pavilion and Essential with the Omni brand (consisting of the OmniBook, OmniDesk and OmniStudio brands), which is designed for the next generation of computing.

== History ==
In June 1993, Hewlett-Packard launched the OmniBook line of business-oriented laptops and subnotebooks. It succeeded the prior HP Vectra LS models of computers. Following the acquisition of Compaq in 2002, the OmniBook line was discontinued in favor of the Compaq Presario, HP Compaq, and HP Pavilion laptops.

In May 2024, HP (as HP Inc.) announced its intentions on restructuring their lineup of consumer PCs in preparation for the next generation of computers with artificial intelligence, stating that most of its PC models (except Omen) would adopt a new branding nomenclature under the new Omni brand, which consisted of the OmniBook, OmniStudio and OmniDesk models. It would coexist alongside the long-running Pavilion brand in use since 1995 among many other brands. The new Omni brand of computers would feature AI-powered hardware and software.

As part of the new Omni branding that year, HP repurposed the old OmniBook name that had been used for its former line of business-oriented laptops in the 1990s for a new line of next generation AI-powered laptops manufactured by HP, reviving the historic nameplate that had been absent for 22 years.

== Models ==
Available models in the HP OmniBook line (1993–2002; 2024–present)
Model name	LCD size and resolution	LCD technology	Processor	Clock speed (MHz)	Graphics	RAM	Max. memory	Storage	Audio	Operating system	Release date	Ref(s).
300	9 in, VGA	Monochrome STN (reflective)	AMD 386SX-LV	20		2 MB	10 MB	40 MB HDD, 10 MB Flash		Windows 3.1 with MS-DOS 5.0	June 1993	
425	9 in, VGA	Monochrome STN (reflective)	TI 486SLC/e	25		2 MB	10 MB	40 MB HDD, 10 MB Flash		Windows 3.1 with MS-DOS 5.0	November 1993	
430	9 in, VGA	Monochrome STN (reflective)	TI 486SLC/e	25		2 MB (40 MB HDD), 4 MB (105 MB HDD)	10 MB	40 MB HDD, 105 MB HDD		Windows 3.1 with MS-DOS 6.2	February 1994	
530	9 in, VGA	Monochrome STN (reflective)	Intel 486SX	33		4 MB	12 MB	130 MB HDD		Windows for Workgroups 3.11 with MS-DOS 6.2	June 1994	
600C	8.5, VGA	Color STN	Intel i486DX4	75			16 MB			Windows for Workgroups 3.11 with MS-DOS 6.2	November 1994	
4000	10.3, VGA (STN) or; 10.4, VGA (TFT)	Color STN or; Color TFT	Intel i486DX2	50			32 MB			Windows for Workgroups 3.11 with MS-DOS 6.2	November 1994	
600CT	9.5, VGA	Color TFT	Intel i486DX4	75			16 MB			Windows for Workgroups 3.11 with MS-DOS 6.2	July 1995	
5500CT	12.1, SVGA	Color STN	Intel Pentium	100 or 120	Local bus video with 1 MB display RAM		64 MB	1.35 GB HDD		Windows for Workgroups 3.11 with MS-DOS 6.22, Windows 95	May 1996	
5500CS	10.4, SVGA or; 12.1, SVGA	Color TFT	Intel Pentium	120 or 133			64 MB			Windows for Workgroups 3.11 with MS-DOS 6.22, Windows 95	May 1996	
800CT	10.4, SVGA	Color TFT	Intel Pentium	133			48 MB	1.44 GB		Windows for Workgroups 3.11 with MS-DOS 6.22 and Windows 95	September 1996	
800CS	10.4, SVGA	Color TFT	Intel Pentium	100			48 MB	2.5" 2 GB IDE hard drive and a 3.5" 1.44 MB floppy drive (external)		Windows for Workgroups 3.11 with MS-DOS 6.22 and Windows 95	September 1996	
5000CT	12.1, SVGA	Color TFT	Intel Pentium	133			48 MB			Windows for Workgroups 3.11 with MS-DOS 6.22, Windows 95	September 1996	
5700	12.1, SVGA	Color TFT	Intel Pentium MMX	150 or 166			160 MB			Windows for Workgroups 3.11 with MS-DOS 6.22 and Windows 95	April 1997	
2000CT	12.1, SVGA	Color TFT	Intel Pentium MMX	133			64 MB			Windows for Workgroups 3.11 with MS-DOS 6.22 and Windows 95	June 1997	
2000CS	12.1, SVGA	Color STN	Intel Pentium MMX	150			64 MB			Windows for Workgroups 3.11 with MS-DOS 6.22 and Windows 95	October 1997	
3000	13.3, XGA	Color TFT	Intel Pentium MMX	233 or 266			144 MB			Windows 95	November 1997	
2100	12.1, SVGA	Color STN or; Color TFT	Intel Pentium MMX	200 or 233			160 MB			Windows 95, Windows NT 4.0	April 1998	
3100	13.3, XGA	Color TFT	Intel Pentium MMX	266			160 MB			Windows 95, Windows NT 4.0	April 1998	
4100	13.3, XGA; 14.1, XGA	Color TFT	Intel Mobile Pentium II	233 or 266			160 MB			Windows 95, Windows NT 4.0, Windows 98	April 1998	
7100	14.1, XGA	Color TFT	Intel Mobile Pentium II	266			288 MB		Sound Blaster Pro-compatible with SRS 3D enhanced audio, Dolby Digital for DVD playback, stereo sound via two built-in speakers and microphone	Windows 95, Windows NT 4.0	April 1998	
Sojourn (Note: Badge-engineered Mitsubishi Pedion)	12.1, SVGA	Color TFT	Intel Mobile Pentium II	233		64 MB	64 MB	1 GB HDD		Windows 95	April 1998	
7150	14.1, XGA	Color TFT	Intel Mobile Pentium II	300			320 MB			Windows 95, Windows NT 4.0, Windows 98	September 1998	
4150; 4150B	13.3, XGA; 14.1, XGA	Color TFT	Intel Mobile Pentium II	300			256 MB			Windows 95, Windows NT 4.0, Windows 98, Windows 2000	October 1998	
900	12.1, SVGA or; 13.3, XGA	Color TFT	Intel Mobile Pentium II or; Intel Mobile Pentium III	300, 360 or 400 (Pentium II); 450 or 500 (Pentium III)			160 MB			Windows 95, Windows NT 4.0, Windows 98	January 1999	
900B	12.1, SVGA or; 13.3, XGA	Color TFT	Intel Mobile Pentium II or; Intel Mobile Pentium III	300, 360 or 400 (Pentium II); 450 or 500 (Pentium III)			192 MB			Windows 95, Windows NT 4.0, Windows 98	1999	
XE	12.1, SVGA (SFN and TFT); 13.3, XGA (TFT)	Color STN (HPA) or; Color TFT	Intel Mobile Pentium II or; Intel Celeron	266 or 300 (Pentium II); 333 (Celeron)			256 MB			Windows 95, Windows NT 4.0, Windows 98	February 1999	
XE2	12.1, SVGA (SFN and TFT); 13.3, XGA (TFT)	Color STN (HPA) or; Color TFT	Intel Mobile Pentium II or; Intel Celeron	300 (Pentium II); 333 (Celeron)			256 MB			Windows 95, Windows NT 4.0, Windows 98	May 1999	
6000	14.1, XGA or; 15.0, SXGA	Color TFT	Intel Mobile Pentium III or; Intel Celeron	700 (Pentium III); 550 (Celeron)	ATI Mobility M/M1 with 2X AGP		128 MB		16-bit Sound Blaster Pro-compatible stereo sound	Windows 95, Windows 98, Windows 2000	May 2000	
XE3	14.1, XGA or; 15.0, SXGA	Color TFT	Intel Mobile Pentium III or; Intel Celeron	933–1133 (Pentium III); 933–1066 (Celeron)	S3 Savage IX		1 GB		ESS Allegro 1988 with built-in stereo speakers and microphone	Windows 98, Windows 2000, Windows XP	September 2000	
500	12.1, XGA	Color TFT	Intel Mobile Pentium III or; Intel Celeron	700 or 750 (Pentium III); 600 (Celeron)			512 MB			Windows 98, Windows 2000	November 2000	
6100	14.1, XGA or; 15.0, SXGA	Color TFT	Intel Mobile Pentium III	1133			512 MB			Windows 98, Windows 2000, Windows XP	August 2001	
XT6200	14.1, XGA or; 15.0, SXGA	Color TFT	Intel Pentium 4 M	1700			1 GB			Windows 2000, Windows XP	March 2002	
VT6200	14.1, XGA or; 15.0, SXGA	Color TFT	Intel Pentium 4 M	1700			1 GB			Windows 2000, Windows XP	March 2002	
X	14, 2.2K (2240 × 1400 pixels)	Color OLED IPS touchscreen	Qualcomm Snapdragon X Elite or; Qualcomm Snapdragon X Plus	3400 (12 cores)	Qualcomm Adreno	16 GB, 32 GB	32 GB	512 GB SSD, 1 TB SSD, 2 TB SSD		Windows 11	May 2024	
Ultra	14, 2.2K (2240 × 1400 pixels)	Color OLED IPS touchscreen	AMD Ryzen AI 300 or Intel Core Ultra 5/7/9	5000 or 5100 (AMD); 4500 or 5100 (Intel)			32 GB			Windows 11	November 2024	

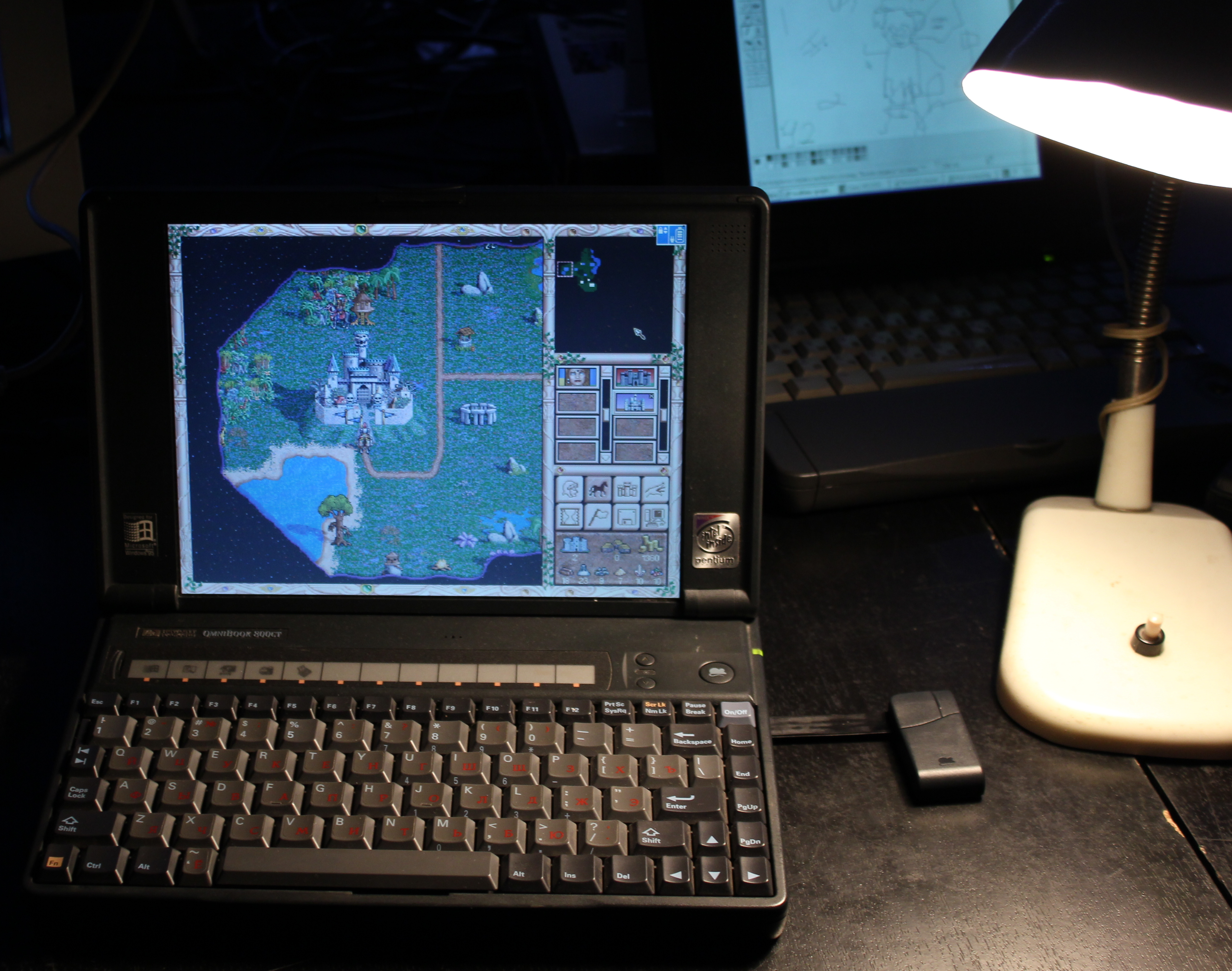
OmniBook 800 (1996)

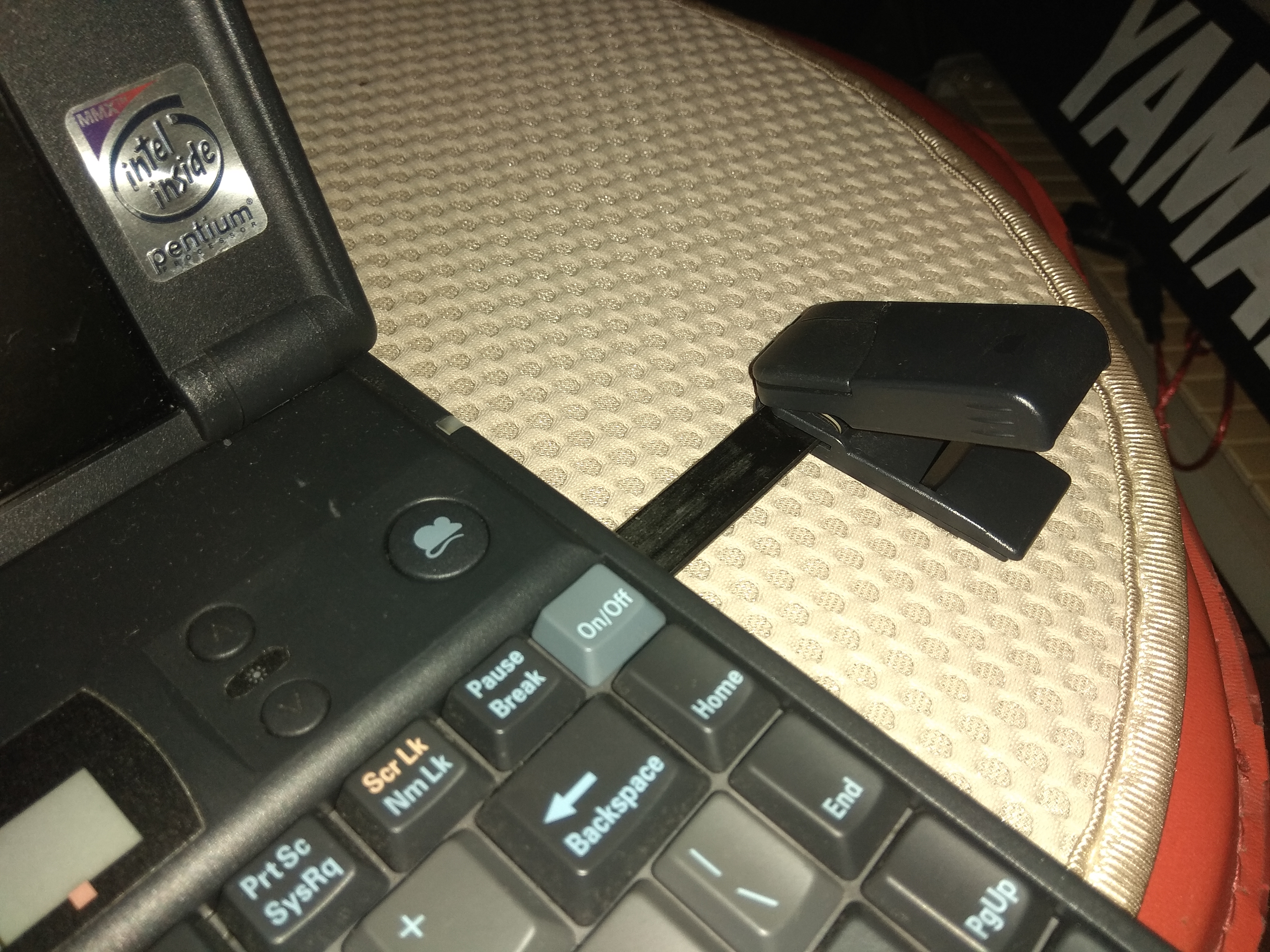
Pop-up mouse of the OmniBook 800CT

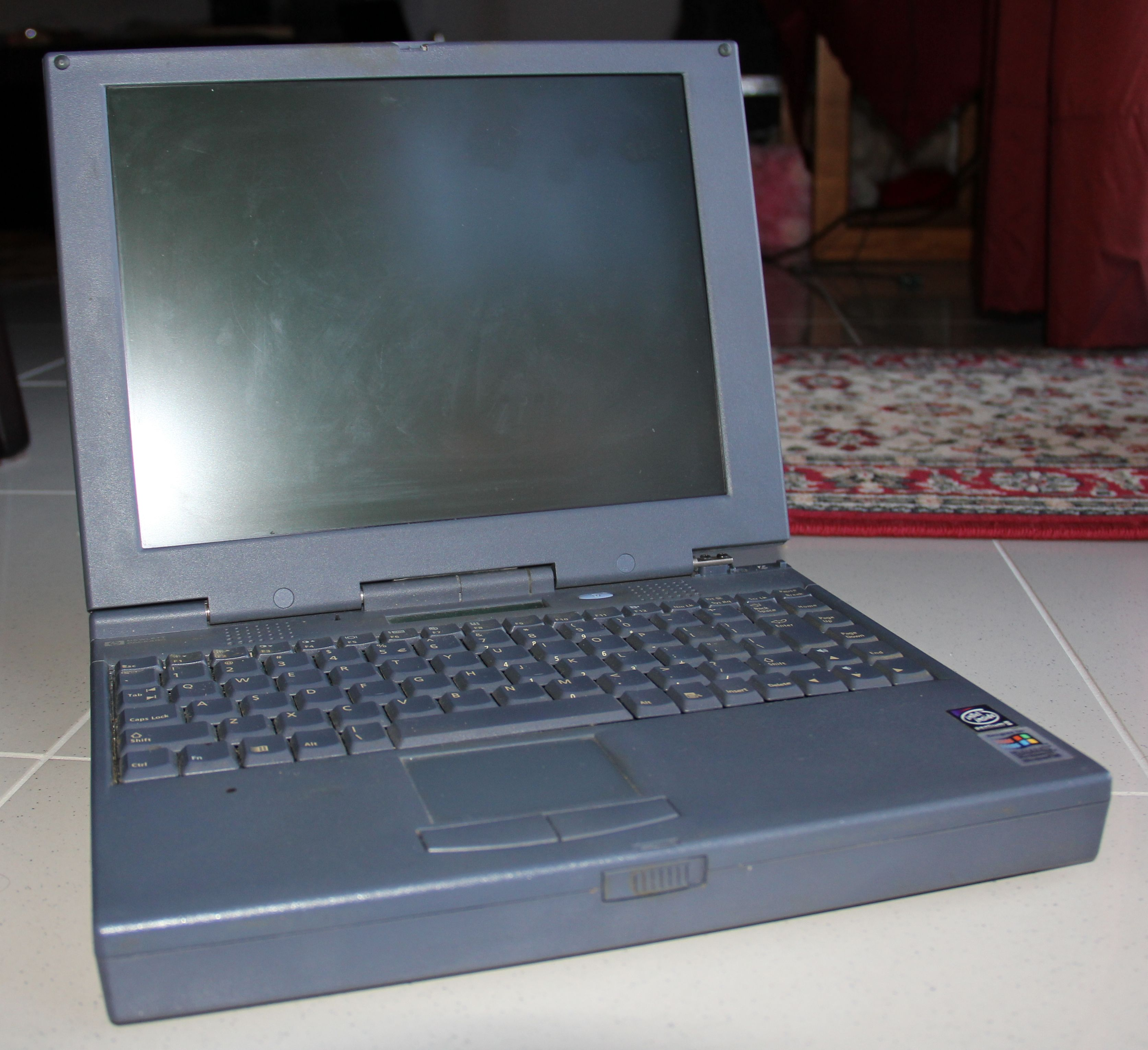
OmniBook 2100 (1998)

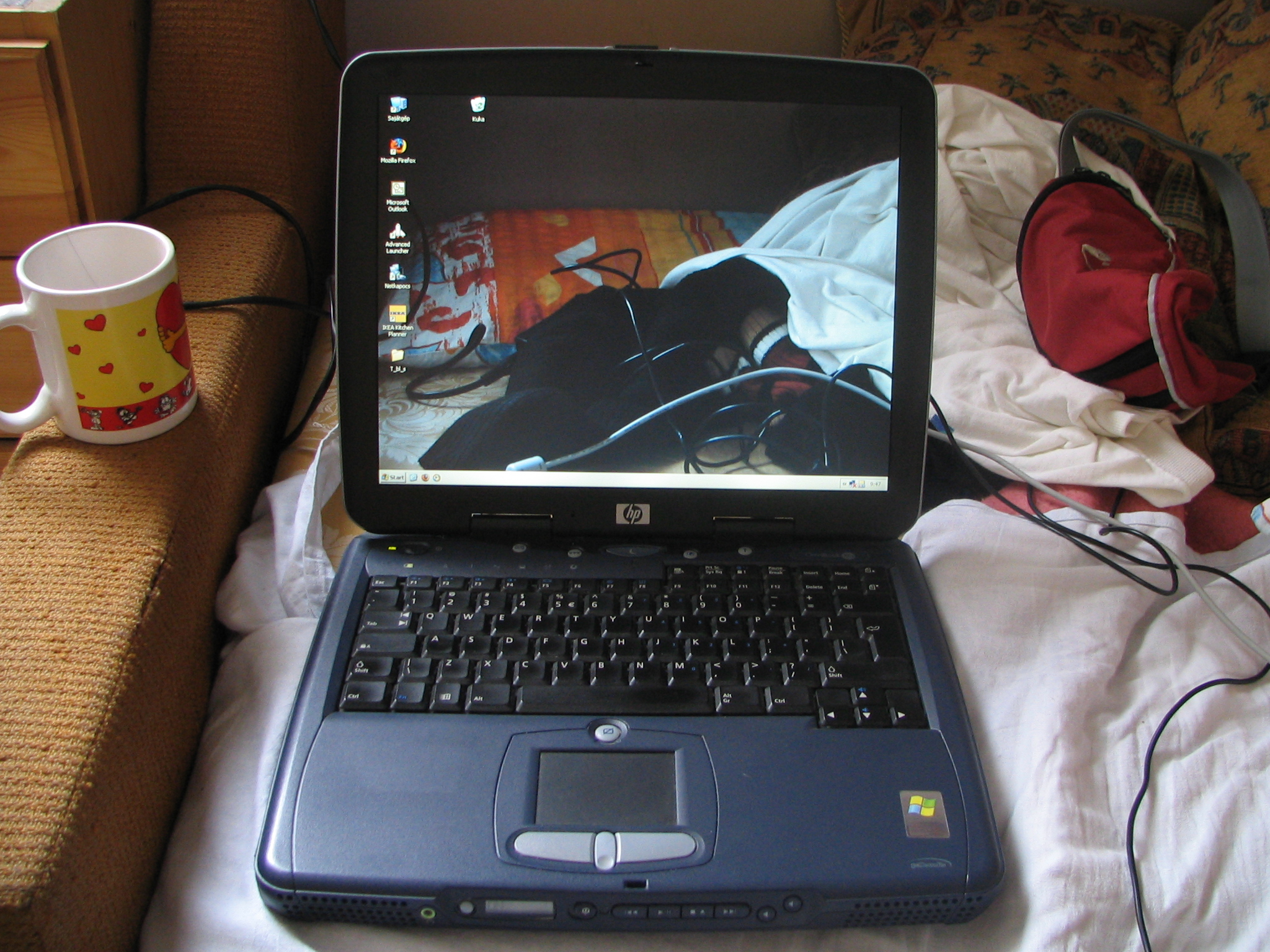
OmniBook XE3 (2000)

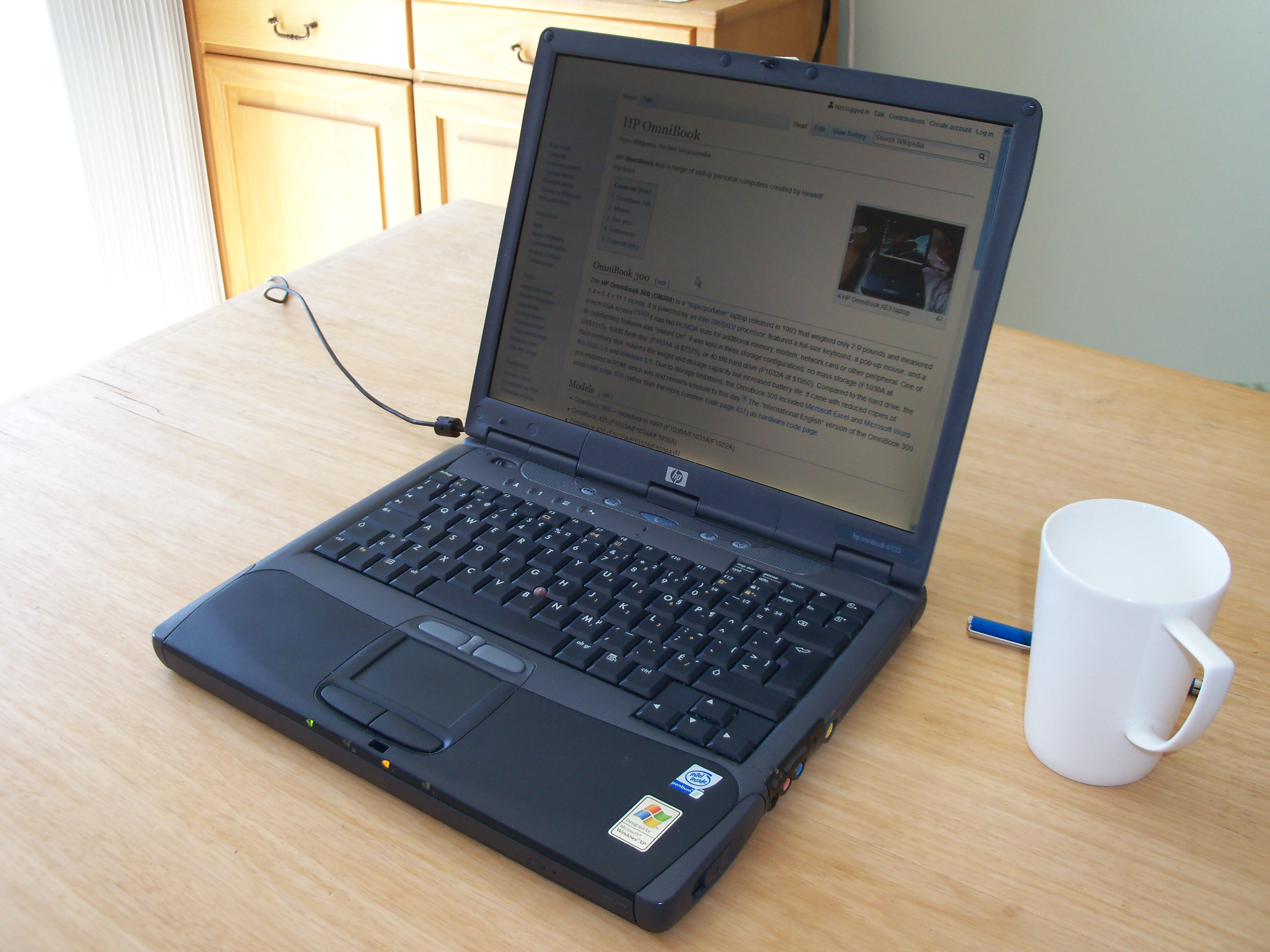
OmniBook 6100 (2001)

The original OmniBook line from 1993 to 2002 consisted of several different models of business notebooks and laptops produced in various sizes and configurations. Many generations of Intel (and sometimes AMD) processors were offered throughout the entirety of the original OmniBook brand, ranging from the original Pentium to the Pentium 4, with some models featuring 386, i486, and Celeron processors. Some OmniBook models from the early-to-mid 1990s also had a small pop-up mouse located on the right-hand side of the computer.

The current OmniBook line since 2024 consisted of various models grouped into five different grades from lowest to highest: 3, 5, 7, X, and Ultra; this format is also shared with the OmniDesk and OmniStudio lines as part of the Omni brand. As of June 2025, the 3 exclusively features AMD Ryzen processors, the 5, 7 and Ultra features AMD Ryzen or Intel Core Ultra processors, and the X features AMD Ryzen, Intel Core Ultra, or Qualcomm Snapdragon processors (specifically the Snapdragon X). Like many models in the Omni brand, all models of the current OmniBook line (as well as the OmniDesk and OmniStudio lines) featured processors with AI technology, dedicated neural processing units (NPUs) for accelerating AI applications and featured Microsoft's Copilot chatbot software as part of a standard installation of Windows.

=== OmniBook 300 ===
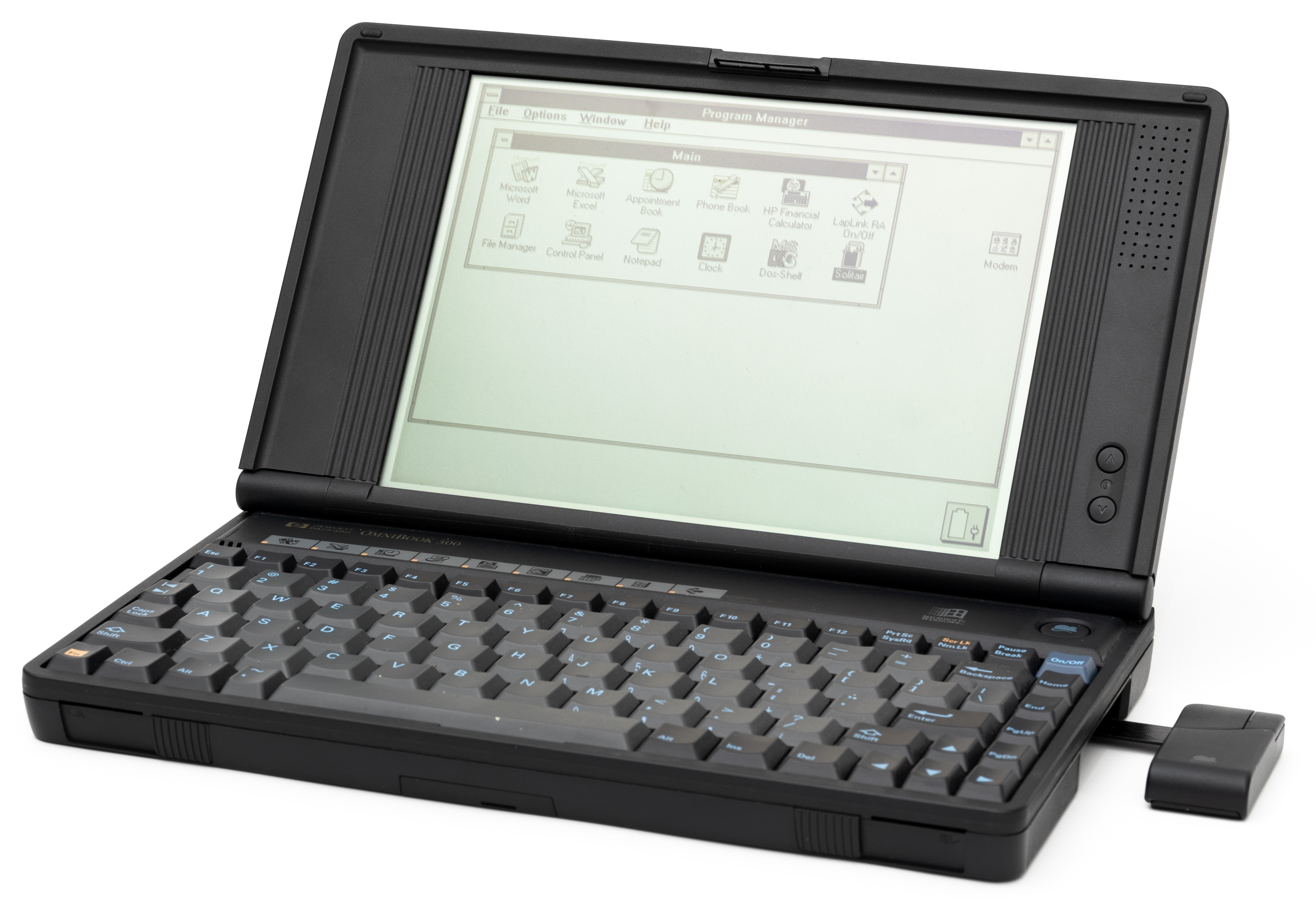
HP OmniBook 300 (1993)

The HP OmniBook 300 (OB300) is a subnotebook released in June 1993 as one of the first models of the original OmniBook line. It weighed only 2.9 pounds and measured 1.4 × 6.4 × 11.1 inches. It is powered by an AMD 386SX-LV processor, featured a full-size keyboard, a pop-up computer mouse (This same pop-up mouse would later be used in the OmniBook 800CT; see the image above), and a 9-inch VGA screen. It had two PCMCIA slots for additional memory, modem, network cards or other peripherals. Furthermore, it came with three different storage configurations: no mass storage (F1030A at US$1,515), 10 MB flash memory disk (F1031A at US$2,375), or 40 MB hard drive (F1032A at US$1,950). Compared to the hard drive, the flash memory disk reduced the weight and storage capacity of the notebook with increased battery life. One of its outstanding features was a technology known as “Instant On”.

The OmniBook 300 came with slimmed-down copies of MS-DOS 5.0 and Windows 3.1. Due to storage limitations, the OmniBook 300 includes both Microsoft Excel and Microsoft Word pre-installed in ROM, a practice that still remains unusual even to this day. The “International English” version of the OmniBook 300 used code page 850 (rather than the more common code page 437) as hardware code page.

=== OmniBook 3 ===
The HP OmniBook 3 is a line of laptops in the current OmniBook line since 2025. It includes AI-powered laptops featuring 14", 15.6", and 16" displays, and with AMD Ryzen AI processors. It is intended to supplement the Essential laptop line.

=== OmniBook 5 ===
The HP OmniBook 5 is a line of laptops in the current OmniBook line since 2025. It includes AI-powered laptops featuring 14" and 16" displays, and with Intel Core Ultra and AMD Ryzen AI processors. It is intended to supplement the Pavilion laptop line.

=== OmniBook 7 ===
The HP OmniBook 7 is a line of laptops released in April 2025 as part of the current OmniBook line. It contains high-end performance laptops and 2-in-1 convertibles with AI capability, featuring robust durability and dedicated AI processors (NPUs) from Intel and AMD. It is intended to supplement the Pavilion and Envy laptop lines.

The main models are the HP OmniBook 7 Aero, an ultralight under 1 kg with AMD, the HP OmniBook 7, a Clamshell in 14", 16", and 17.3", and the HP OmniBook 7 Flip, with a 2-in-1 convertible with a touchscreen and 360-degree hinge. Specifications vary depending on the specific model, which are Aero, Clamshell, or Flip; but the range's key features include processor options such as up to Intel Core Ultra 7 or Ultra 9 or AMD Ryzen AI 7 350. They feature integrated Intel Arc or AMD Radeon graphics, and in the 16" and 17.3" models, there is an option for dedicated NVIDIA GeForce RTX 4050 graphics. Regarding memory and storage, they offer from 16GB up to 32GB of LPDDR5x RAM and from 1TB up to 2TB of PCIe Gen4 SSD storage. The range presents a variety of display options, from 13.3" up to 17.3", with IPS or OLED panels and resolutions up to 3K with 120Hz refresh rates.

All models come with Windows 11 pre-installed, a 5MP IR webcam compatible with Windows Hello, and modern connectivity that includes Thunderbolt 4 ports on Intel models, USB-C, and Wi-Fi 6E/7. Battery life is a strong point, with a nominal duration of up to 26 hours and fast charging capabilities.

=== OmniBook X ===
The HP OmniBook X is a line of laptops released in May 2024 as part of the current OmniBook line. It includes AI-powered laptops featuring 14", 16", and 17.3" displays, and with Intel Core Ultra, AMD Ryzen AI, and Qualcomm Snapdragon X Elite processors. It is intended to supplement the Envy laptop line.

==== OmniBook X 14-fe000 ====
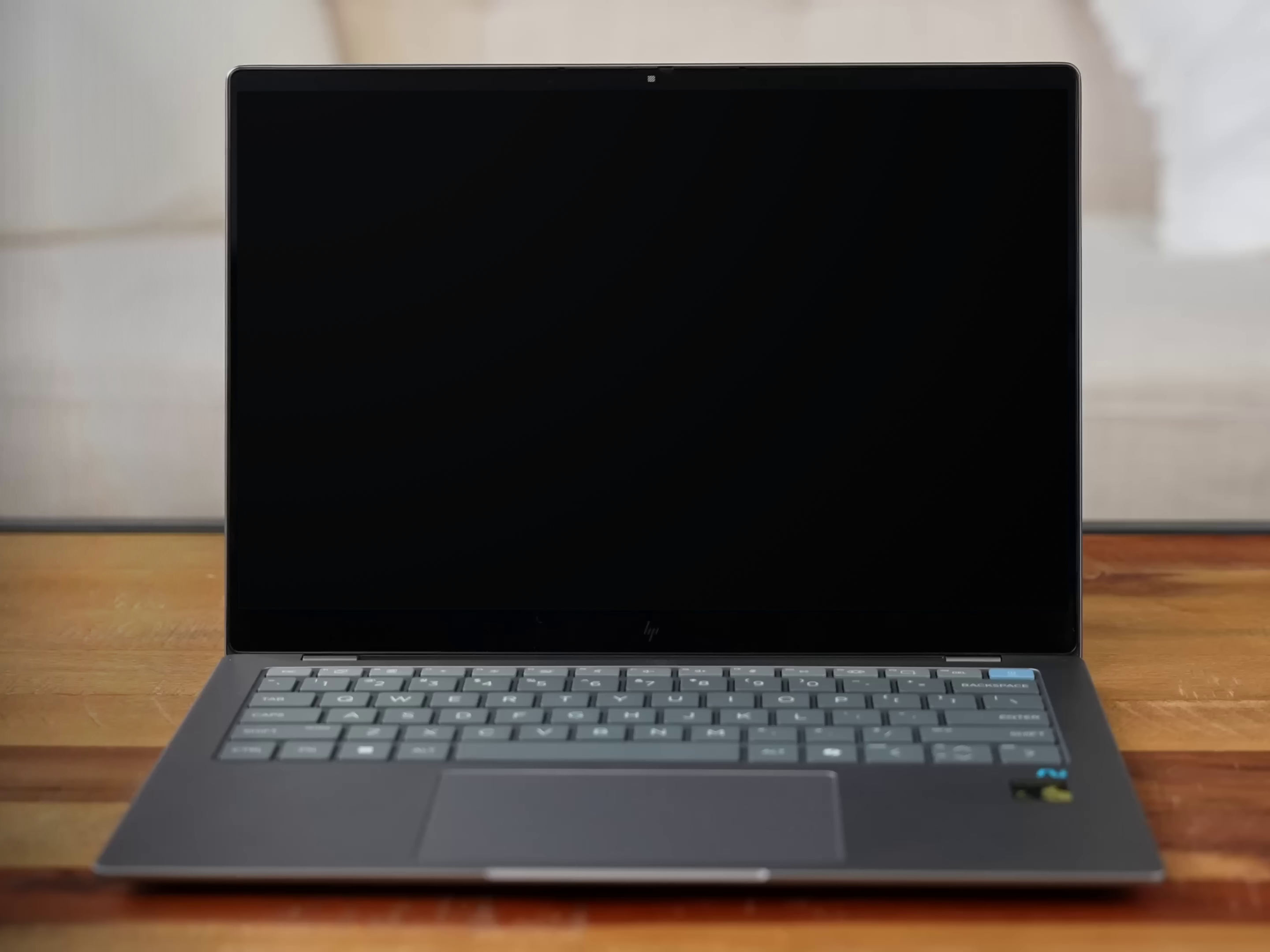
HP OmniBook X (2024)

The HP OmniBook X 14-fe000 is a laptop first announced in May 2024 as the first model of the current OmniBook line. It is part of the OmniBook X series of laptops as a next-generation AI-powered PC. It weighs at about 2.97 pounds and measures 12.32 × 8.8 × 0.56 inches in the front and 12.32 × 8.8 × 0.57 inches in the rear. It is powered by a Qualcomm Snapdragon X Elite processor with a dedicated NPU powered by the Snapdragon processor for accelerating AI applications, a Qualcomm Adreno GPU, a 14" OLED IPS touchscreen display with a 2240 × 1400 display resolution, 16 GB or 32 GB memory, and either a 512 GB, 1 TB or 2 TB solid-state drive. It also features a built-in 5MP webcam, as well as a Qualcomm Wi-Fi 6E or Wi-Fi 7 wireless card. Battery life of the OmniBook X is rated at about 26 hours.

The OmniBook X came pre-installed with Windows 11 and includes the Copilot AI chatbot, Windows Studio Effects, and Poly Studio audio tuning. The OmniBook X is compliant with Microsoft's Copilot+ PC platform marketing brand, with also includes the addition of a dedicated Copilot key on the keyboard replacing the menu key found in previous keyboards.

=== OmniBook Ultra ===
The HP OmniBook Ultra is a line of laptops released in November 2024 as part of the current OmniBook line. It includes AI-powered laptops featuring 14" displays, and with Intel Core Ultra and AMD Ryzen AI processors. It succeeds the previous Spectre laptop series.

== See also ==
- HP OmniGo
