= Mitsubishi Pedion =

Pedion
- Developer: Mitsubishi Electric; Hewlett-Packard
- Manufacturer: Mitsubishi Electric
- Type: Subnotebook
- Released: 1998; 28 years ago
- CPU: Pentium MMX at 233 MHz
- Memory: 64 MB of RAM

The Pedion was a subnotebook computer developed by Mitsubishi Electric with Hewlett-Packard in 1998. Hewlett-Packard marketed a rebadged version of the Pedion under their OmniBook brand of notebooks and subnotebooks, called the OmniBook Sojourn, in the same year. Mitsubishi's subnotebook is named after the Greek word pedion (πεδίον), meaning "plain", "flat", "field".

At 0.7244 inches (18.40 mm) thick, the Pedion was the thinnest notebook computer in the world, even thinner than 2008's MacBook Air 0.75 inches (19.05 mm); the MacBook Air was 4 mm at its thinnest point, however. The Pedion included a Pentium MMX processor clocked at 233 MHz, 64 MB of RAM, and a 1 GB hard disk drive.

The Pedion was the first laptop on the market to feature an island-style keyboard—a design for laptop keyboards in which they contain scissor-style switches with low travel and simplified flat keycaps separated from each other by a plastic bezel. This style of keyboard technology would not proliferate on laptop keyboards until nearly a decade later.

Mitsubishi ceased production and withdrew the notebook from the market due to "mechanical problems".
