= Quick time =

Quick time may refer to:

- Quick time (pace) a pace of a military step
- Quick time event
- Quick Time steps in Scottish highland dancing
- QuickTime
