= HP Spectre =

Discontinued laptop computer series by HP

- Developer: Hewlett-Packard (2012–15); HP Inc. (2015–25)
- Manufacturer: Hewlett-Packard (2012–15); HP Inc. (2015–25)
- Type: Laptop
- Released: 2012; 14 years ago
- Lifespan: 2012–2025
- Discontinued: July 2025; 1 year ago
- Operating system: Windows
- CPU: Intel, AMD
- Graphics: AMD, Nvidia
- Marketing target: Consumer
- Successor: HP OmniBook Ultra
- Related: HP Pavilion, HP TouchSmart, HP Envy, HP Omen
- Website: HP Spectre landing page

HP Spectre is a discontinued line of premium portable computers manufactured and marketed by Hewlett-Packard from 2012 to 2015 and by its successor HP Inc. from 2015 to 2025. Introduced as a high-end version of the HP Envy line in 2012, it was HP's flagship line of laptop products for consumers starting in 2016.

As of 2024, the Spectre line has been phased out in favor of the AI-powered OmniBook series (a consumer-oriented revival of an old brand of the same name that was originally defunct after merging with Compaq in 2002) due to a corporate brand streamlining that happened that year. All remaining Spectre models were sold up until July 2025, when they were replaced by the OmniBook Ultra series.

== Models ==
=== Envy Spectre / Spectre XT ===
The Spectre first appeared as a model under the Envy series: Envy 14 Spectre. This ultrabook (i.e. Intel's designation of thin high-end laptops) received a large amount of attention when revealed at CES 2012, and it won CNET's Best of CES award in its category. Retailing for US$1399, it weighs four pounds and includes a radiance display, a gorilla glass screen and palm rest, a buttonless multitouch touchpad, an NFC chip and solid-state drive.

Envy Spectre XT is a 13-inch ultrabook that retailed for US$999 in 2012. A variant called Envy Spectre XT Pro was also released, which is the same but includes a TPM module and ships with Windows 7 Professional. It retailed for $100 extra.

The Spectre XT TouchSmart (see also: HP TouchSmart) has the same design as the Envy Spectre XT, but with a larger footprint and the addition of a touch operated display. Announced in September 2012, it shipped with Windows 8.

=== Spectre One ===
In September 2012, HP announced Spectre One, an all in one desktop computer shipping with Windows 8. It has a 23.6-inch display, measures 11.5 mm thick, and covered by edge to edge glass.

=== Spectre 13 / x2 ===
The HP Spectre 13 ultrabook (model no. series 13-3000) introduced in 2013 has a fourth generation Intel Core (Haswell) processor, Intel HD 4400 graphics, and a full HD IPS display with optional 2560×1440 Sharp IGZO display upgrade.

The Spectre 13 x2 (model no. series 13-H) is a 13.3-inch detachable hybrid ultrabook that doubles as a standalone tablet or a laptop. This is the first fanless detachable hybrid ultrabook powered by Intel's Haswell (fourth generation Core) processor. It was available for pre-order in October 2013 with prices of $1099.

=== Spectre x360 ===
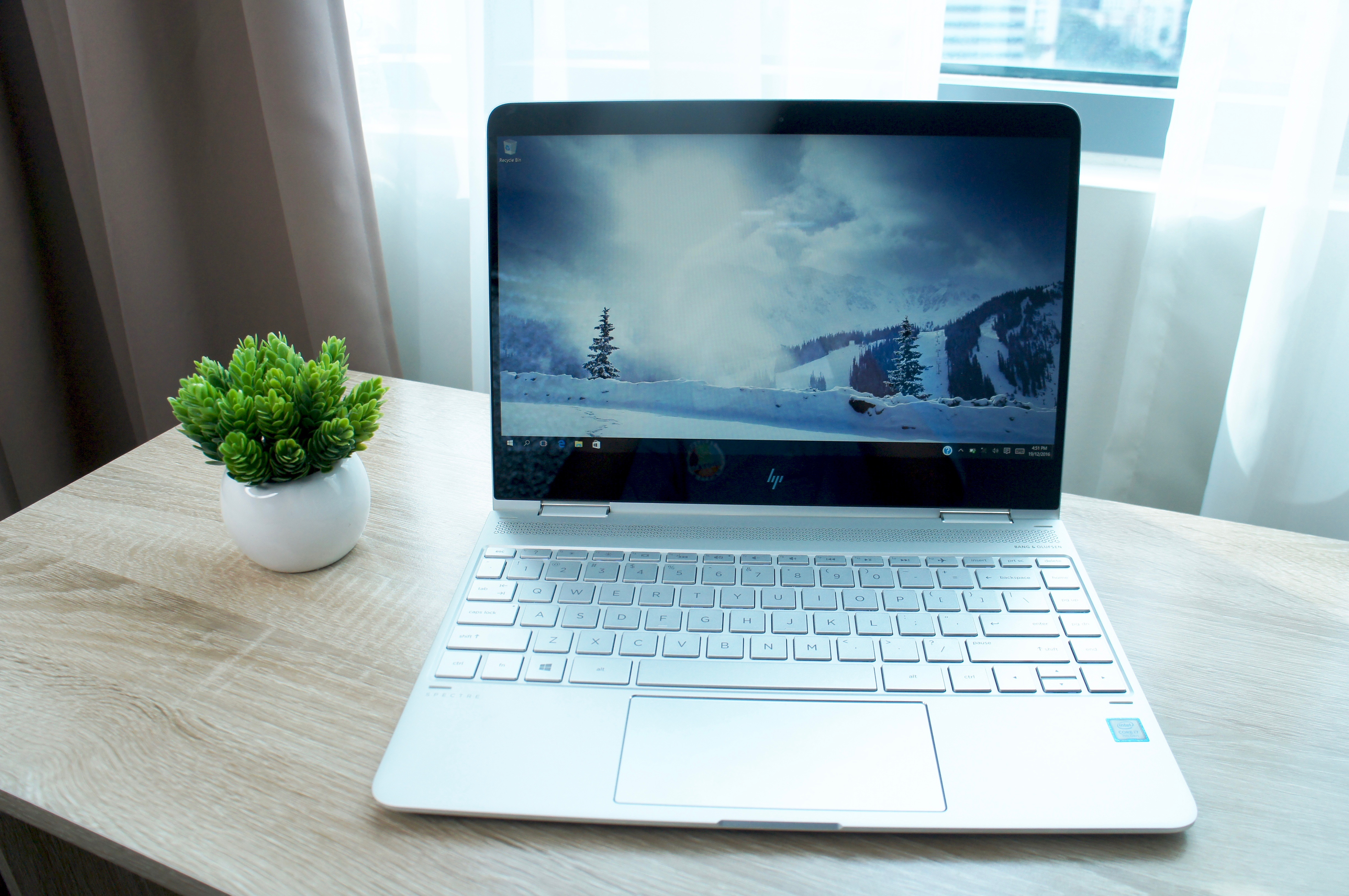
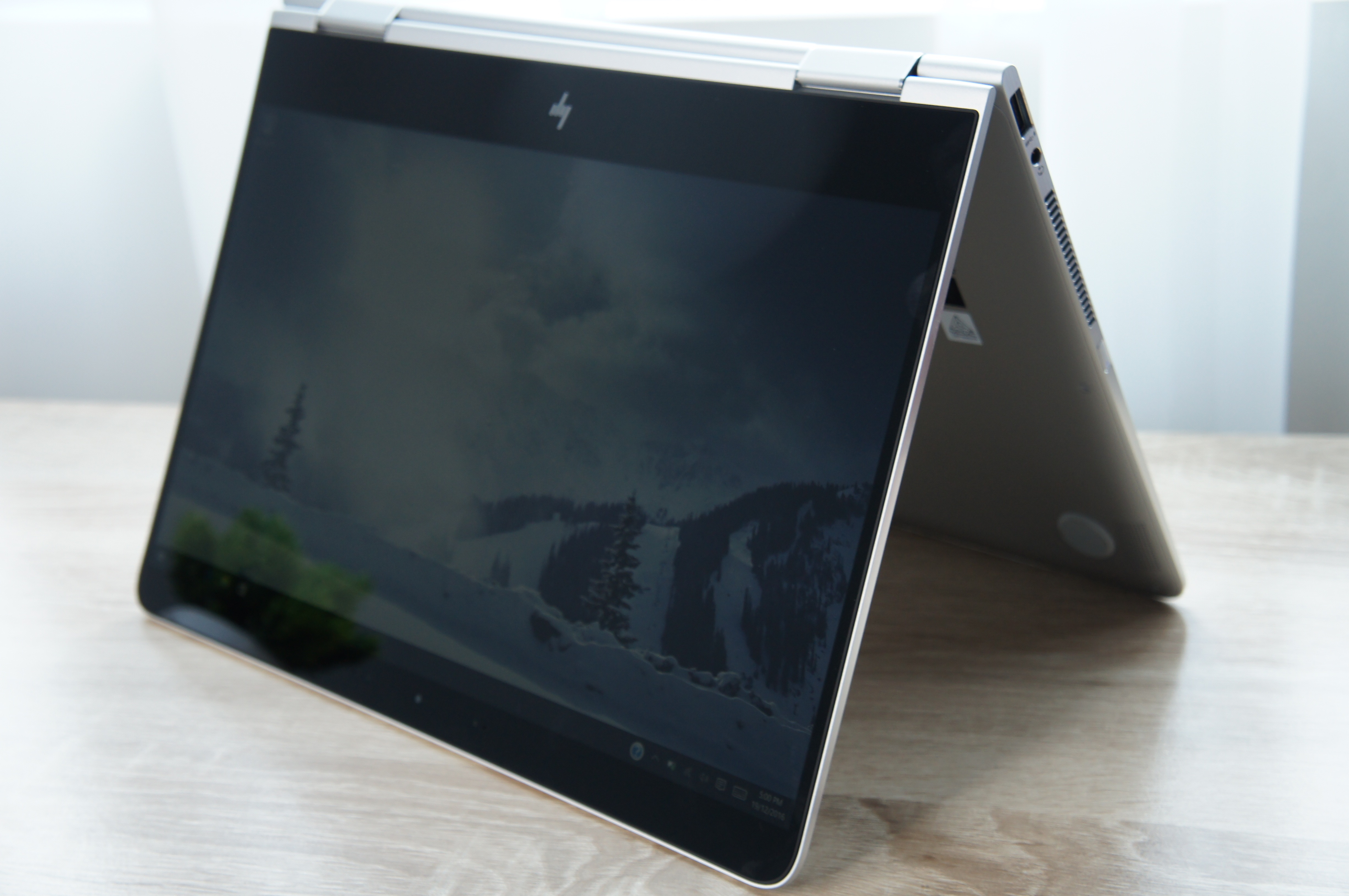
HP Spectre x360 (2016)

The Spectre x360 models are 2-in-1 convertibles; its name refers to its 360 degree hinge. HP also make similar x360 branded convertibles in the Envy and Pavilion lines.

The first Spectre x360 (also called Spectre Pro x360) ran on Broadwell 5th generation Intel Core. Released in March 2015, retailing for US$899. It has a distinctive HEWLETT PACKARD wordmark embossed on the front and the lid. In October 2015, an updated x360 (also called Spectre Pro x360 G2) came out with the 6th generation Skylake processor. At CES 2016 the 15-inch model with Skylake was announced.

In October 2016, a third generation Spectre x360 13 was released with Intel's Kaby Lake (7th generation Core). With a refreshed design and featuring the new Spectre-specific HP logo (which was later adopted for some of HP's high-end products), it is smaller, thinner, and adds a Thunderbolt 3 port. Spectre x360 15 with Kaby Lake was announced a few months later. The next revision came later in 2017 with 8th generation Core, and a 4K resolution touch display. Again, this was followed by a 15-inch variant introduced at CES 2018 featuring Gorilla Glass and support for the HP Tilt Pen. Updated models were released in October 2018 (13-inch) and January 2019 (15-inch) using 8th generation Refresh processors of Intel Core.

The 2019 version of Spectre x360 13 with 10th generation Intel Core has a smaller footprint compared to the previous, removing most bezels. The Spectre x360 15 debuted at CES 2020. In September 2020, a new generation Spectre x360 13 came using 11th generation Tiger Lake Core processors; a new Spectre x360 14 was also introduced, with a 3:2 ratio display measuring. A year later, Spectre x360 16, with a 16-inch screen, was introduced.

The line was updated to 12th generation Intel Core in May 2022. The previous generation's Spectre x360 13 (which had a 13.3" 16:9 display) and Spectre x360 14 (which had a 13.5" 3:2 display) were essentially replaced by a single Spectre x360 13.5 model (which HP also market as simply 'Spectre x360 2-in-1 Laptop'). 2024 saw the introduction of the next generation x360 models and the first with the Intel's Core Ultra branding.

As of July 2025, the Spectre x360 was one of the only remaining models available in the Spectre series shortly before it was replaced with the OmniBook Ultra series afterwards.

==== Comparison table ====
Series	Announced (MM/YYYY)	Display	Processor	Graphics	Memory	Storage	Audio	OS	Ref.
13-4000	03/2015	13.3" (16:9) FHD or QHD	Intel Core 5th generation	Intel HD Graphics	4 GB-8 GB	256 GB SSD		Windows 8.1	
13-4100	10/2015	13.3" (16:9) FHD or QHD	Intel Core 6th generation	Intel HD Graphics	4 GB-8 GB			Windows 10	
15-ap	01/2016	15.6" (16:9) OLED (FHD) or LED (UHD)	Intel Core 6th generation	Intel HD Graphics or Intel Iris Graphics	8 GB-16 GB			Windows 10	
13-ac	10/2016	13.3" (16:9)	Intel Core 7th generation					Windows 10	
13-w0	10/2016	13.3" (16:9)	Intel Core 7th generation					Windows 10	
15-bl0	01/2017	15.6" (16:9)	Intel Core 7th generation					Windows 10	
13-ae	10/2017	13.3" (16:9) 1080p or 4K, optional HP Sure View	Intel Core 8th generation	Intel UHD Graphics				Windows 10	
15-bl1	01/2018	15.6" (16:9)	Intel Core 8th generation					Windows 10	
15-ch	01/2018	15.6" (16:9)	Intel Core 8th generation					Windows 10	
13-ap	10/2018	13.3" (16:9)	Intel Core 8th generation					Windows 10	
15-df0	01/2019	15.6" (16:9)	Intel Core 8th generation					Windows 10	
13-aw	09/2019	13.3" (16:9)	Intel Core 10th generation					Windows 10	
15-df1	01/2020	15.6" (16:9)	Intel Core 10th generation					Windows 10	
14-ea	09/2020	13.5" (3:2)	Intel Core 11th generation					Windows 10	
15-eb	09/2020	15.6" (16:9)	Intel Core 11th generation					Windows 10	
16-f0000	09/2021	16" (16:10)	Intel Core 11th generation					Windows 11	
16-f1000	05/2022	16" (16:10)	Intel Core 12th generation					Windows 11	
14-ef1000	08/2022	13.5" (3:2)	Intel Core 12th generation					Windows 11	
16-f2000	02/2023	16" (16:10)	Intel Core 13th generation					Windows 11	
14-ef2000	03/2023	13.5" (3:2)	Intel Core 13th generation					Windows 11	
16-aa0000	12/2023	16" (16:10)	Intel Core Ultra 7 155H	Intel Arc Graphics Optional: NVIDIA® GeForce RTX™ 4050 Laptop GPU (6 GB GDDR6 dedicated)	16GB-32GB	512GB, 1TB, 2TB SSD		Windows 11	
14-eu	12/2023	14" (3:2)	Intel Core Ultra 5 125H Intel Core Ultra 7 155H	Intel Arc Graphics	16GB-32GB	512GB, 1TB, 2TB SSD		Windows 11	

=== Spectre x2 ===
HP Spectre x2 (model no. 12-A) is a 12-inch convertible released in 2015 and features a fanless Intel Core M processor.

The second generation x2 (model no. 12-C) was announced in 2017. It moved away from the lower power Core M to the higher Core i series, offered up to i7. It has a 12.3-inch 3000×2000 IPS display.

=== Spectre 13 ===
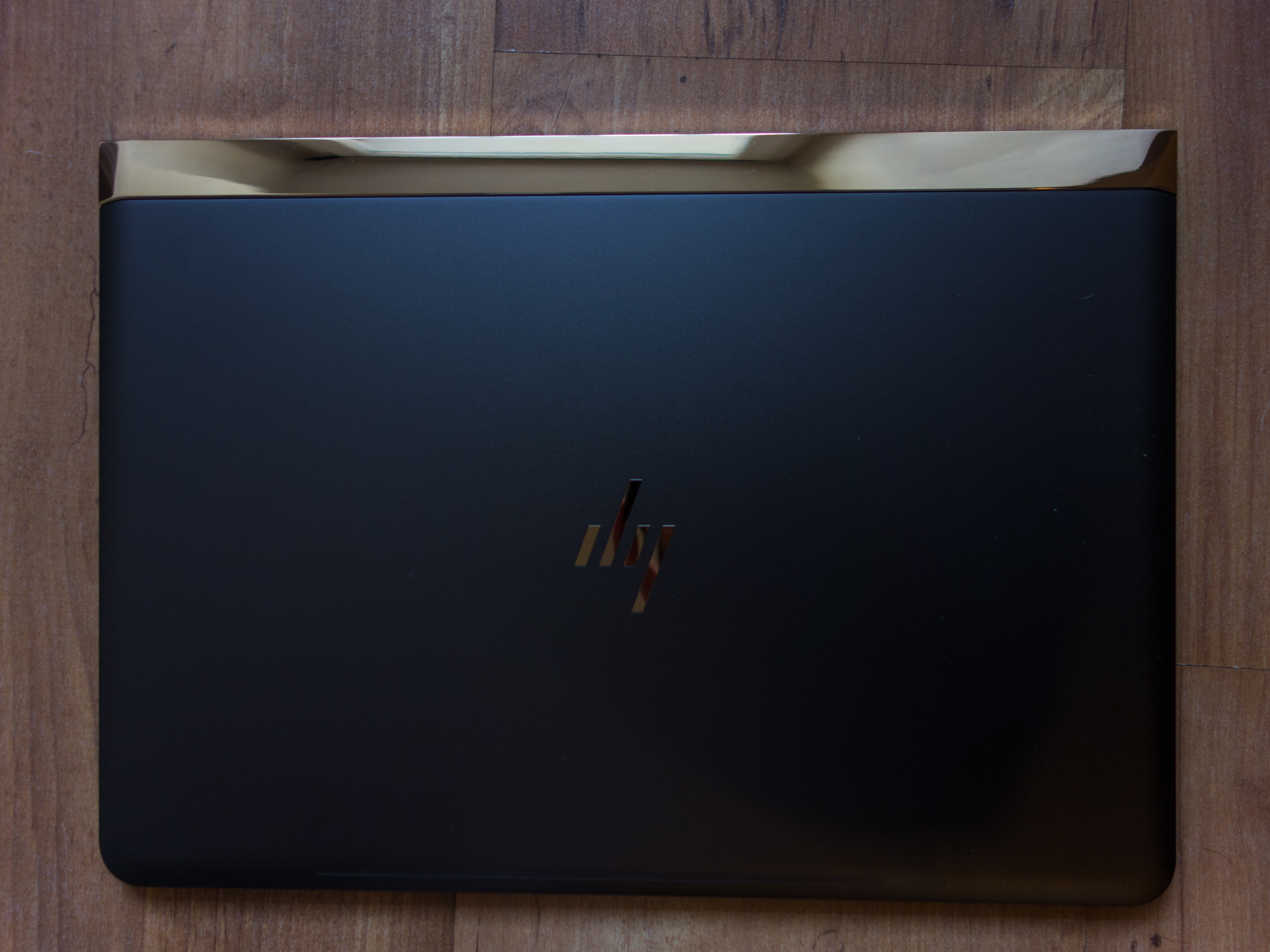
HP Spectre (2017)

In 2016, HP unveiled the Spectre (model no. 13-V), which HP would later market as Spectre 13. With a thickness of 10.4 mm, HP called it the thinnest laptop ever. It also introduced with it the new alternative HP logo featuring thin lines, which has since been adopted in some other products. A second generation (model no. 13-AF) came in 2017 with a reduced size and slimmer bezels.

=== Spectre Folio ===
HP announced the Spectre Folio (model no. 13-AK) in October 2018 made of metal and leather. It retailed starting from $1299, with the Core i7 and LTE edition selling for $1499.

=== Spectre Fold ===
In September 2023, the Spectre Fold foldable computer was introduced, which HP calls a "3-in-1" desktop, laptop, and tablet.
