= HP Pavilion =

Discontinued line of computers produced by Hewlett-Packard

- HP Pavilion 5030 (1995)
- Developer: Hewlett-Packard (1995–2015); HP Inc. (2015–2026)
- Manufacturer: Hewlett-Packard (1995–2015); HP Inc. (2015–2026)
- Type: Personal computers
- Released: August 1995; 31 years ago
- Lifespan: 1995–2026
- Discontinued: November 2025; 1 year ago (desktops); August 2026; 3 months ago (laptops)
- Operating system: Windows
- CPU: AMD, Intel
- Graphics: AMD, Nvidia, Intel
- Marketing target: Consumer
- Successor: OmniBook (laptops); OmniDesk, OmniStudio (desktops)
- Related: Essential, Envy, Spectre, TouchSmart

HP Pavilion is a discontinued line of consumer-oriented personal computers originally produced by Hewlett-Packard and later by its successor, HP Inc. Introduced in 1995, HP has used the name for both desktops and laptops for home and home office use.

After acquiring Compaq in 2002, HP sold both HP- and Compaq-branded machines under the Pavilion and Presario names respectively from 2002 to 2013.

The Pavilion brand was discontinued in favor of the AI-powered Omni brand (OmniBook, OmniStudio, OmniDesk) due to a corporate streamlining of products that happened in 2024. All products of the Pavilion brand were sold until mid 2026.

== History ==
Closeup view of the HP Pavilion 5030

On August 14, 1995, HP introduced the HP Pavilion brand of IBM PC–compatible computers as a new line of computers designed exclusively for home computing market with the release of the HP Pavilion PC series. The first computer released for the brand was the HP Pavilion 5030 multimedia desktop computer. While not the first multimedia PC the company made, it was the first computer made by HP that was designed specifically for the home market. Prior to this, the first multimedia PCs made by the company were the HP Multimedia PC 6100, 6140S, and 6170S. As an entry-level model, the Pavilion 5030 featured a 75 MHz Intel Pentium processor, 8 MB RAM, an 850 MB hard drive, a quad-speed CD-ROM drive, Altec Lansing speakers, and includes some software for online service access. It came shipped with Windows 95 preinstalled, coinciding with the then-upcoming launch of Microsoft's then-new operating system at the time.

Prior to the introduction of the Pavilion line in 1995, HP was known for their business-oriented models such as those from the HP Vectra series as well as the OmniBook (1993–2002) line of business notebooks. HP also produced a low-cost, high-speed infrared transceiver that allowed wireless data exchange in a range of portable computing applications, these included telephones, computers, printers, cash registers, automatic teller machines, and digital cameras. Around the same year the Pavilion was introduced, Dave Packard published The HP Way: How Bill Hewlett and I Built Our Company, a book based on the company's The HP Way philosophy that chronicles the rise of Hewlett-Packard in the 1940s through the 1990s and gave consumers insight into its business practices, culture, and management style.

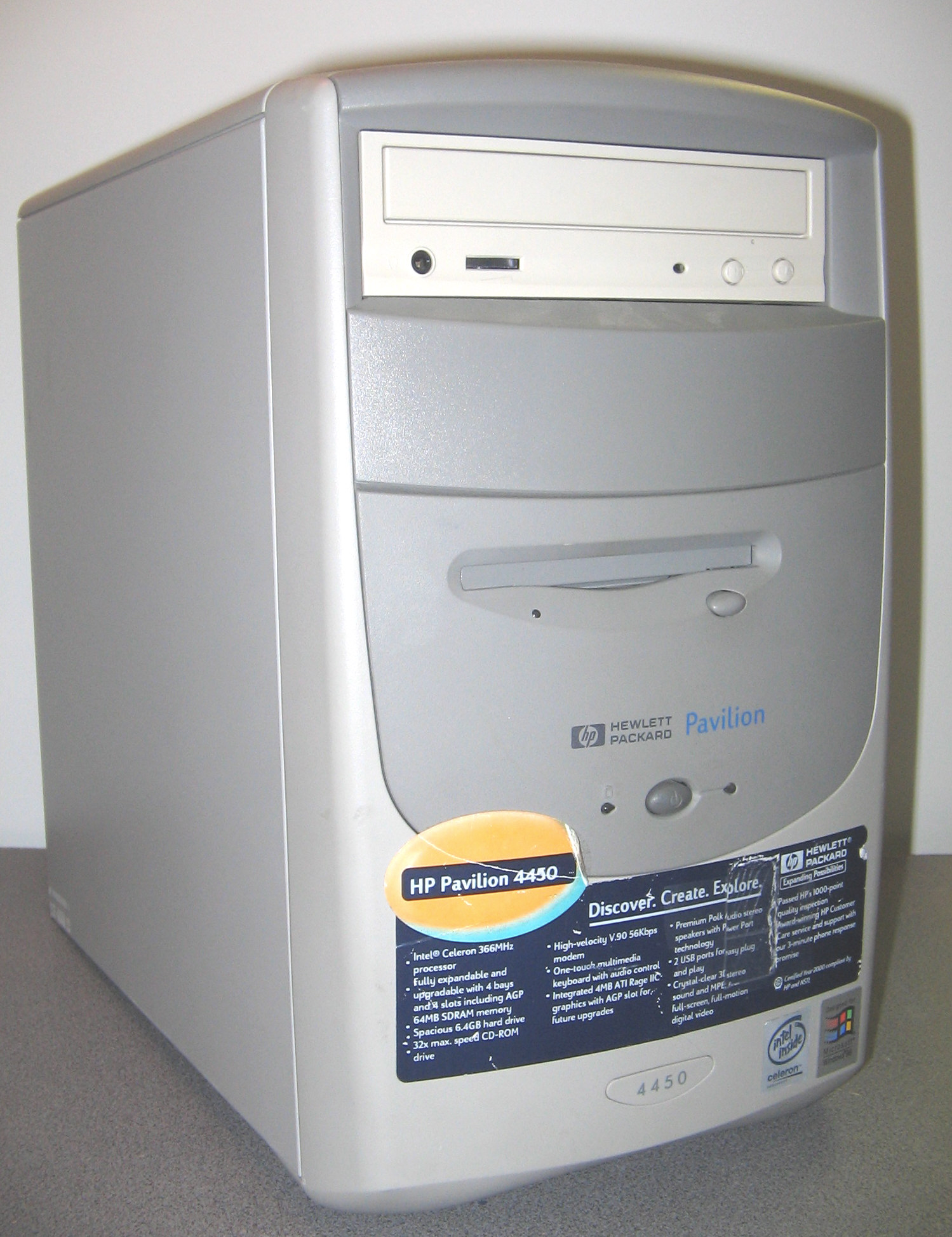
HP Pavilion 4450 (1999) Intel Celeron 366 MHz

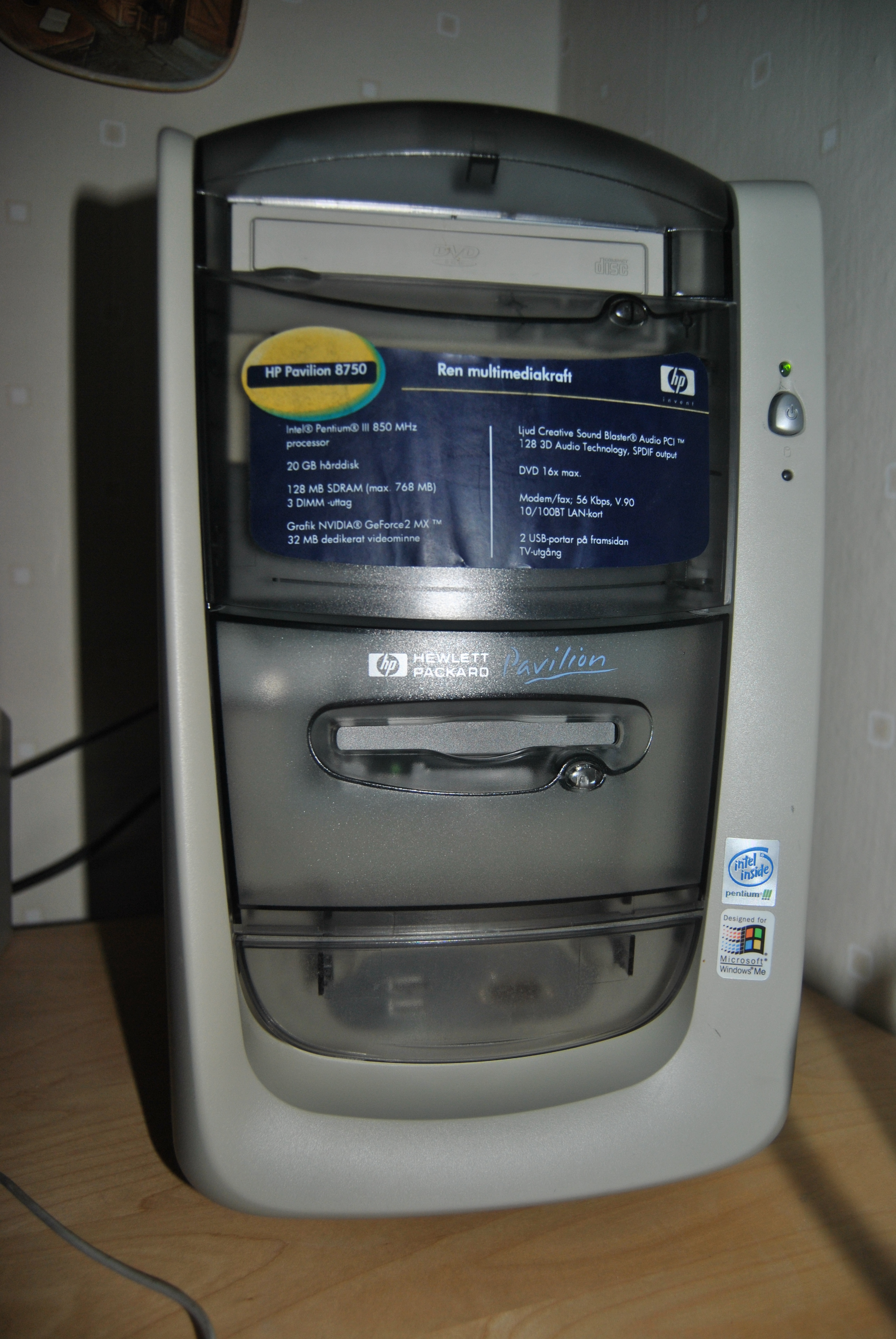
HP Pavilion 8750 (2000/2001)

The first laptops and notebooks under the Pavilion brand were announced on October 4, 1999, becoming the first laptop and notebook computers made by HP that was sold in the retail (home) market outside of the business market. The initial models were the HP Pavilion N3100 series (including the HP Pavilion N3110, N3150 and N3190), which featured a 433–466 MHz Intel Celeron processor, 32–64 MB RAM, a 4.8–6.4 MB hard drive, a 4x–24x CD-ROM drive, a 12.1–14.1 inch LCD screen, built-in speakers, a PC Card slot, some software for online service access, and came shipped with Windows 98 Second Edition preinstalled.

In May 2002, HP acquired Compaq, a former information technology company known for their various computing products such as the Presario line of computers and the ProLiant series of servers, among others. After acquiring the company, HP then took over Compaq's existing naming rights agreement and so sold both HP- and Compaq-branded machines until 2013.

In May 2024, HP announced its plans on restructuring their consumer-oriented brands for their computers, with the Pavilion, Envy and Spectre brands (except for Omen) being succeeded by the OmniBook, OmniStudio and OmniDesk brands as part of the new Omni brand. This change also marked the return of HP's formerly defunct OmniBook brand after its initial discontinuation in 2002 following the acquisition of Compaq that year. The Omni brand would consist of computers utilizing next-generation AI technologies.

Following the announcement, the Pavilion lineup was gradually retired, with new desktop models being sold until as late as November 2025 when they were replaced by the HP OmniDesk series, while new laptop models were sold until as late as August 2026 when they were replaced by the HP OmniBook 5 and 7 series, ending production of all new computers in the Pavilion lineup after 31 years.

== Desktops ==
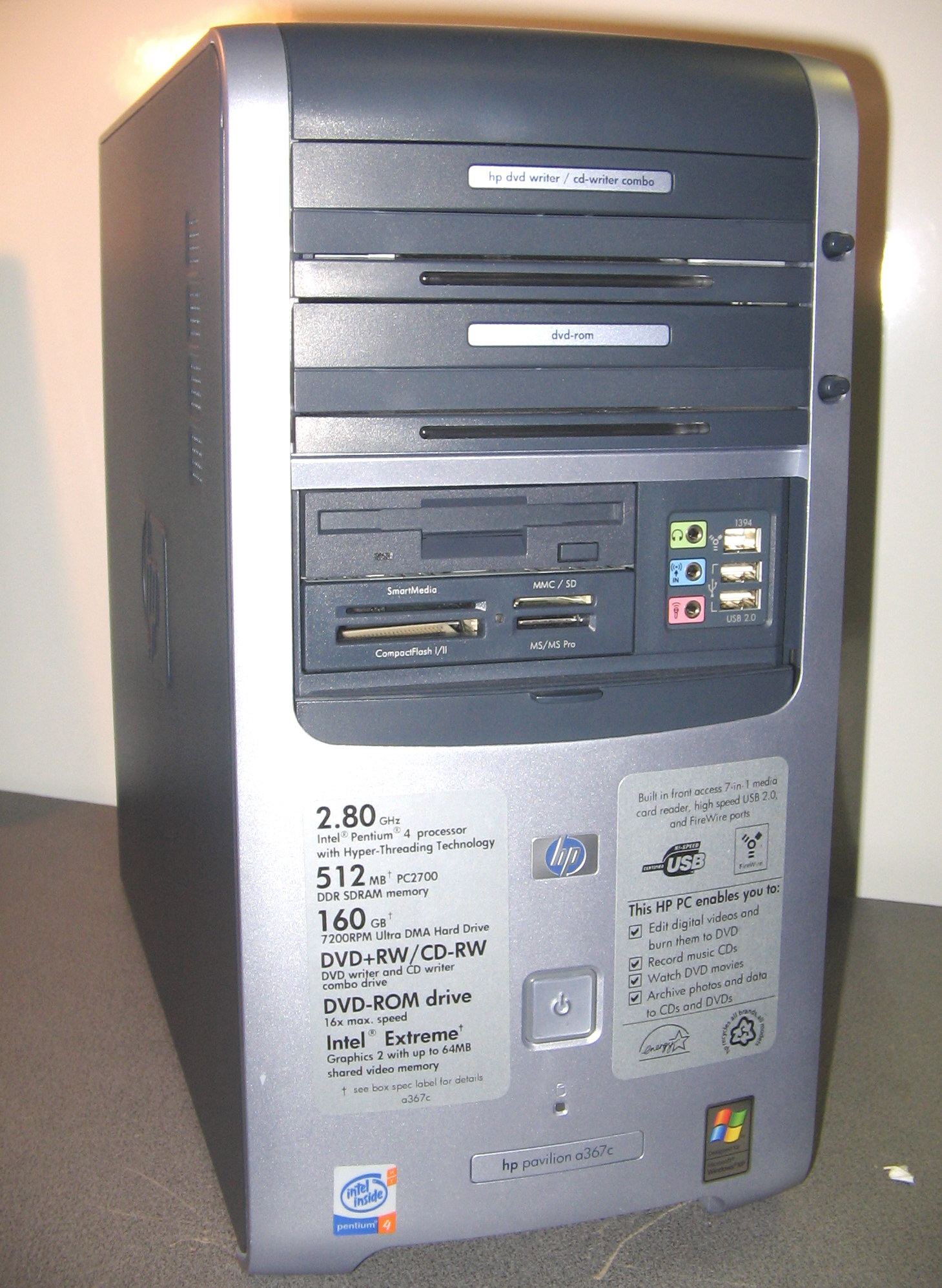
HP Pavilion a367c (2003)

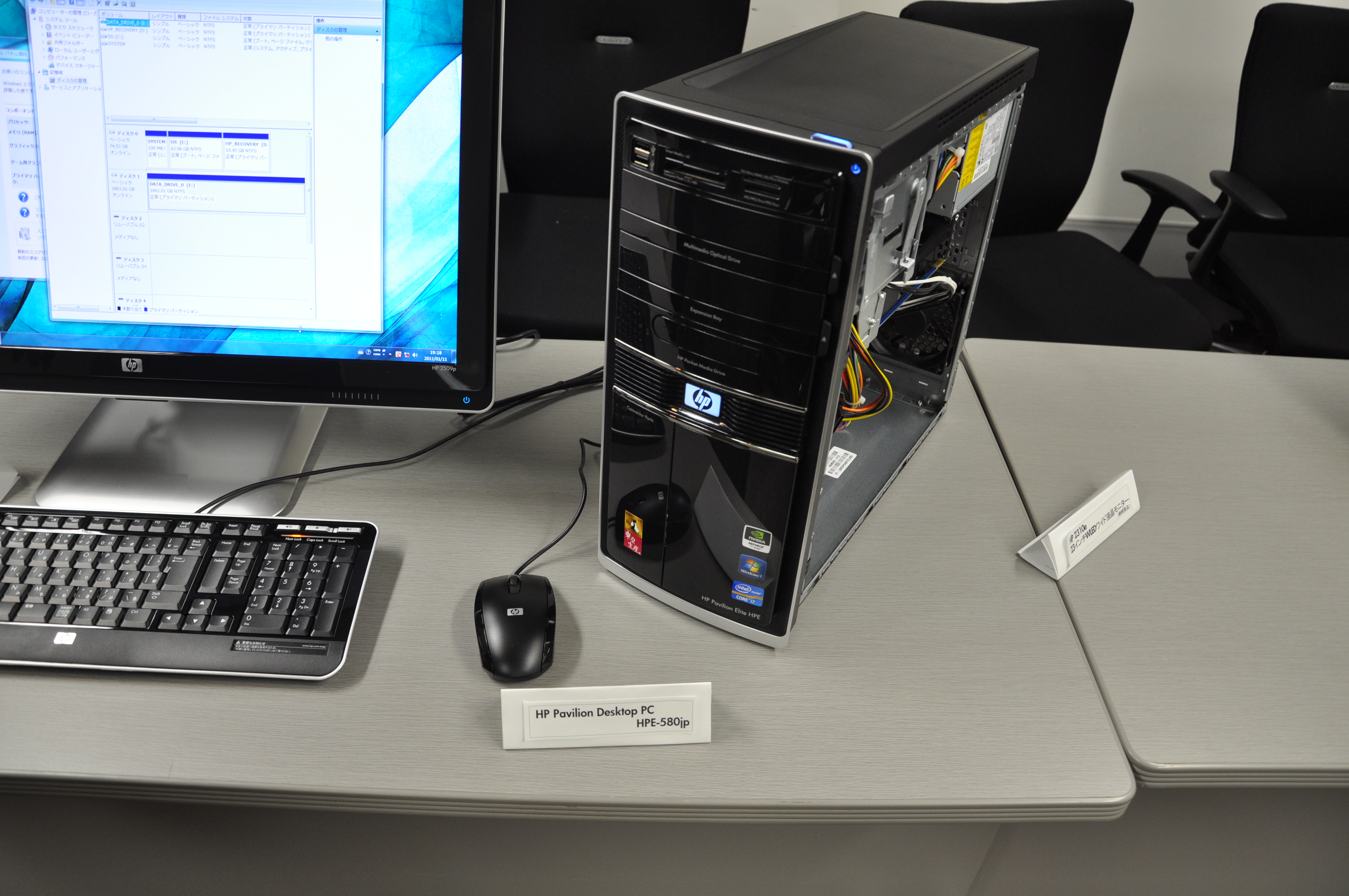
HP Pavilion HPE 580jp (2011)

HP has produced desktops under the Pavilion name since 1995, which were sold up until November 2025, when they were succeeded by the OmniDesk series.

In 2012, about 30 customizable desktops were offered by HP; of these, 5 are standard HP Pavilion, 4 are Slimline, 6 are High Performance Edition (HPE), 5 are "Phoenix" HPE Gaming editions*, 5 are Touchsmart, and 5 are All-In-One.

In 2020, the HP Pavilion Gaming brand succeeded the previous "Phoenix" HPE Gaming edition brand, and is a line of budget gaming computers offered in both desktop and laptop form factors. The HP Pavilion Gaming brand was discontinued in 2022.

=== List of desktop models ===
(Note that is a non-exhaustive list and may never satisfy completeness but shows some of the more or less recent models under the Pavilion brand.)

- HP Pavilion: a255c, a445c, a1740n, a6560t, a6560z, a6510t, a6500z, a6460t, a6450z, a6410t, a6400z, a6250z, a6250t, a6210z, a6205t, a6200t, a6600z, a6608f, a6610t, ?6617?, a6660t, a6660z, a6700z, a6750f, p6300z, p6310t, p6350z, p6370t, p6380t, a705w, p7m, p7z, p7t, p7xt, p7qe, tp01

a000 series - Panther / Jaguar
a1000 series - Mojave / Gobi
a6000 / p6000 series - Venus / Venus2

- HP Pavilion Slimline: s3100n, s3200t, s3200z, s3400t, s3400z, s3500t, s3500z, s3600f, s3600t, s3600z, s3700f, s3700z, s3710t, s3750t, s5305z, s5310t, s5350z, s5370t, s5380t, s5730f, s7350n, s5m, s5t, s5z, s5xt
- HP Pavilion Media Center: a1330n, a1410n, a1600n, m7580n (XP Only), m8300, m8100y, m8200n, t000,
- HP Pavilion Elite/HPE (High Performance Edition): m9350f, m9300t, m9300z, m9200t, m9200z, m9000t, m9000z, d5000z, d5000t, d5100t, m9400t, m9400z, d5200t, e9300z, HPE 110t, HPE 150t, HPE 170t, HPE 180t, HPE 190t, h8m, h8t, h8z, h8xt, h8qe, h8se
- HP Pavilion HPE (High Performance Edition) Phoenix (Gaming): h9-1100z, h9-1120t, h9-1150t, h9-1170t, h9-1135, h9-1200ex *(not customizable)
- HP Pavilion Ultimate: d4999t, d4999z
- HP Pavilion Wave: 600t
- HP Touchsmart PC: iq770t, iq772t, IQ504t, IQ506t, IQ804t, 300z, 600t, 600xt, 600 Quad, 310z, 610z, 610t, 610xt, 610 Quad
- HP Pavilion All-In-One/Omni Series: 23SE, MS220z, 200t, 100z, 100t, 200t, 200xt, 200 Quad

=== Model number suffixes ===
The suffix on the model number, if present, indicates special information such as processor or country. The following chart describes each suffix.

- t: Intel processor
- z: AMD processor
- qe: Quad Edition
- sb: Small Business Series
- se: Special Edition
- y: CTO – Configure To Order
- f: Unknown (possibly related to image media)

Two-letter country codes such as

- us: United States
- ca: Canada
- br: Brazil
- la: Latin America
- ap: Asian Pacific
- au/ax/tu/tx: Asia/Australia
- ea/ec/ee/eo/(e plus a letter): Eastern & Western Europe
- sa/sc/se/so/(s plus a letter): Eastern & Western Europe
- na/nc/ne/no/(n plus a letter): Eastern & Western Europe
- qr: Russia
- jp: Japan

=== Overheating problems ===
The HP Pavilion Slimline desktops are housed in small form factor cases. As a result, they can quickly become very hot, due to their small size.

== Laptops ==
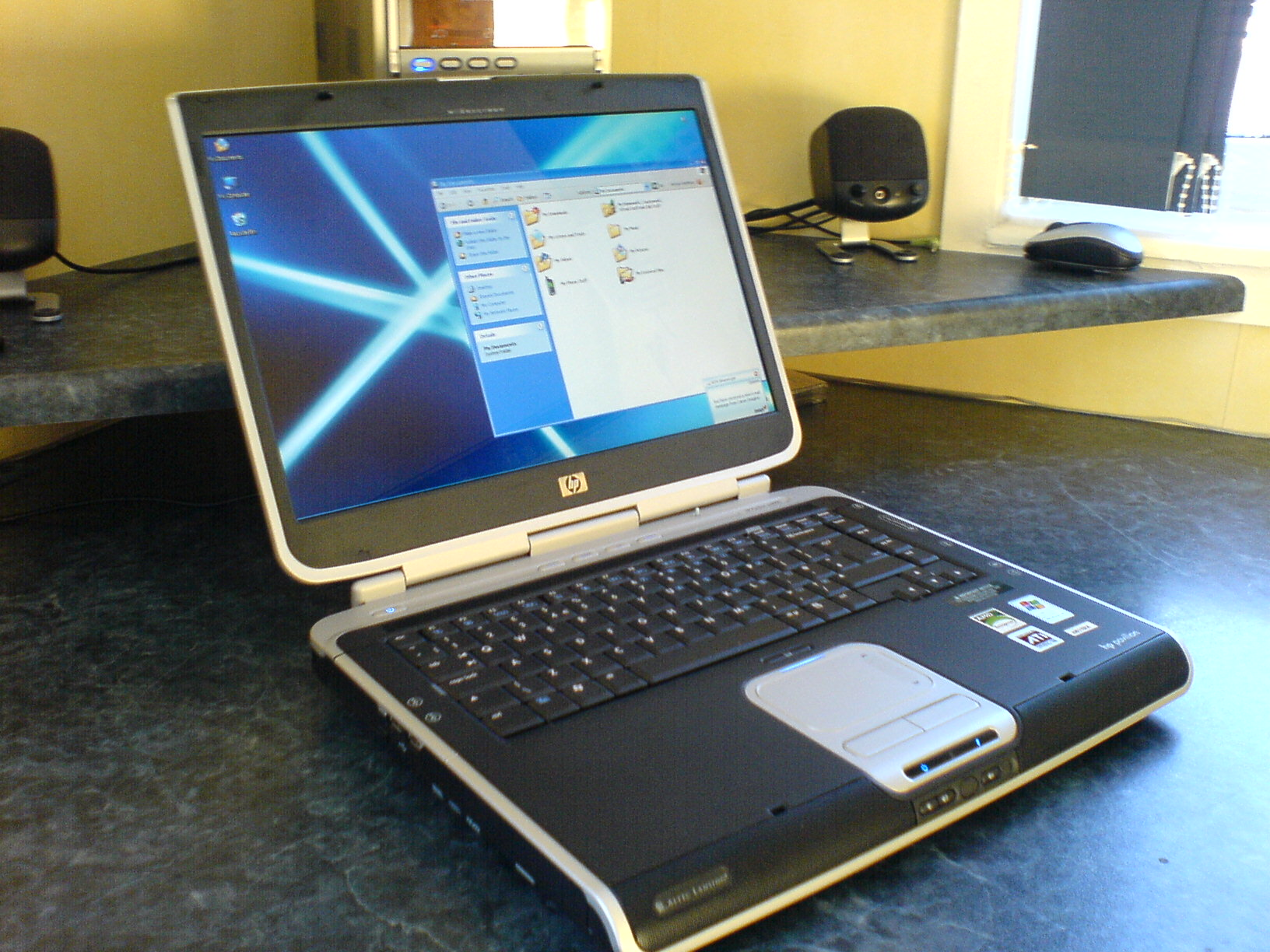
HP Pavilion zv series (zv6115EA, 2004)

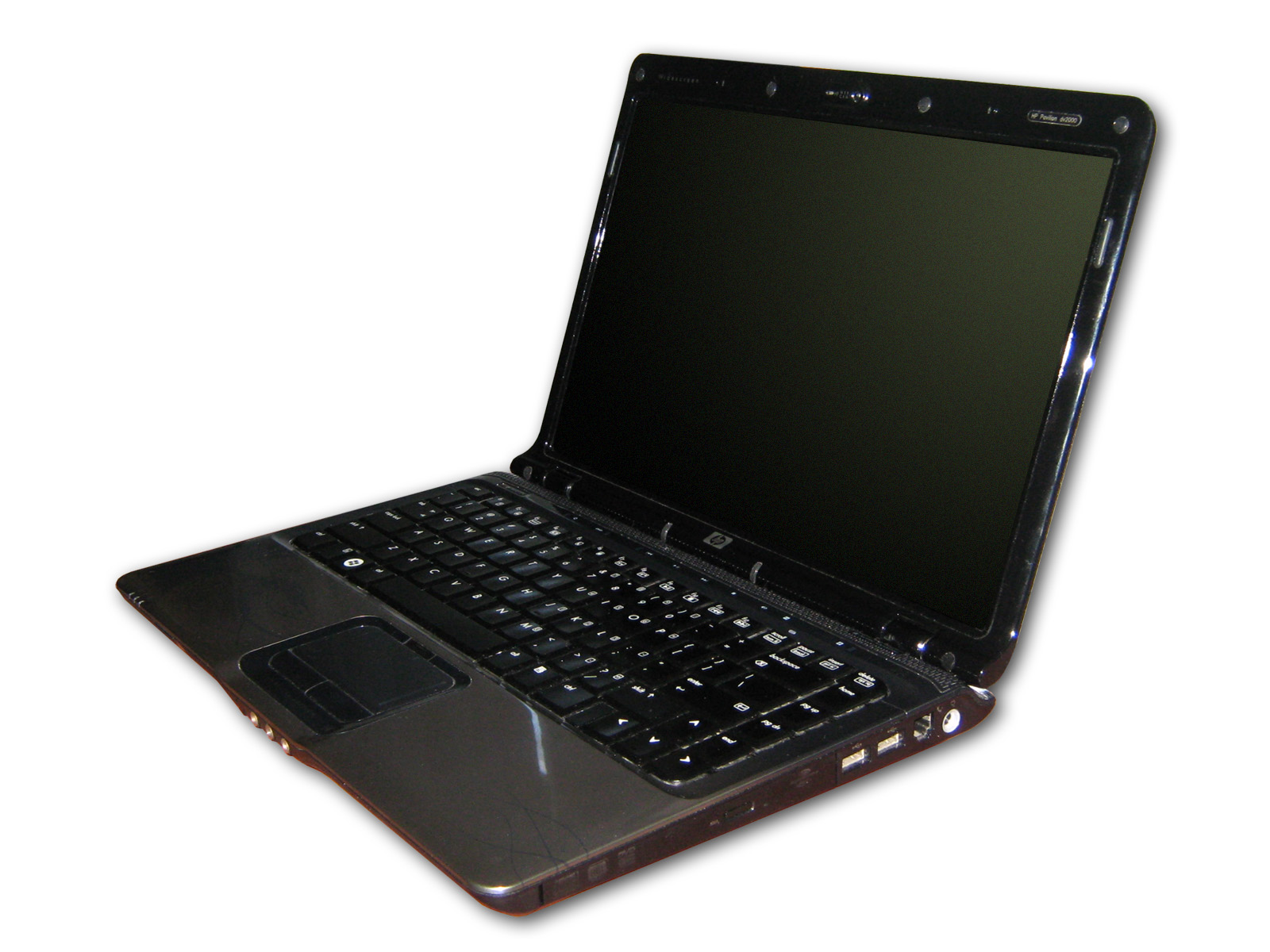
HP Pavilion dv series (dv2500se, 2007)

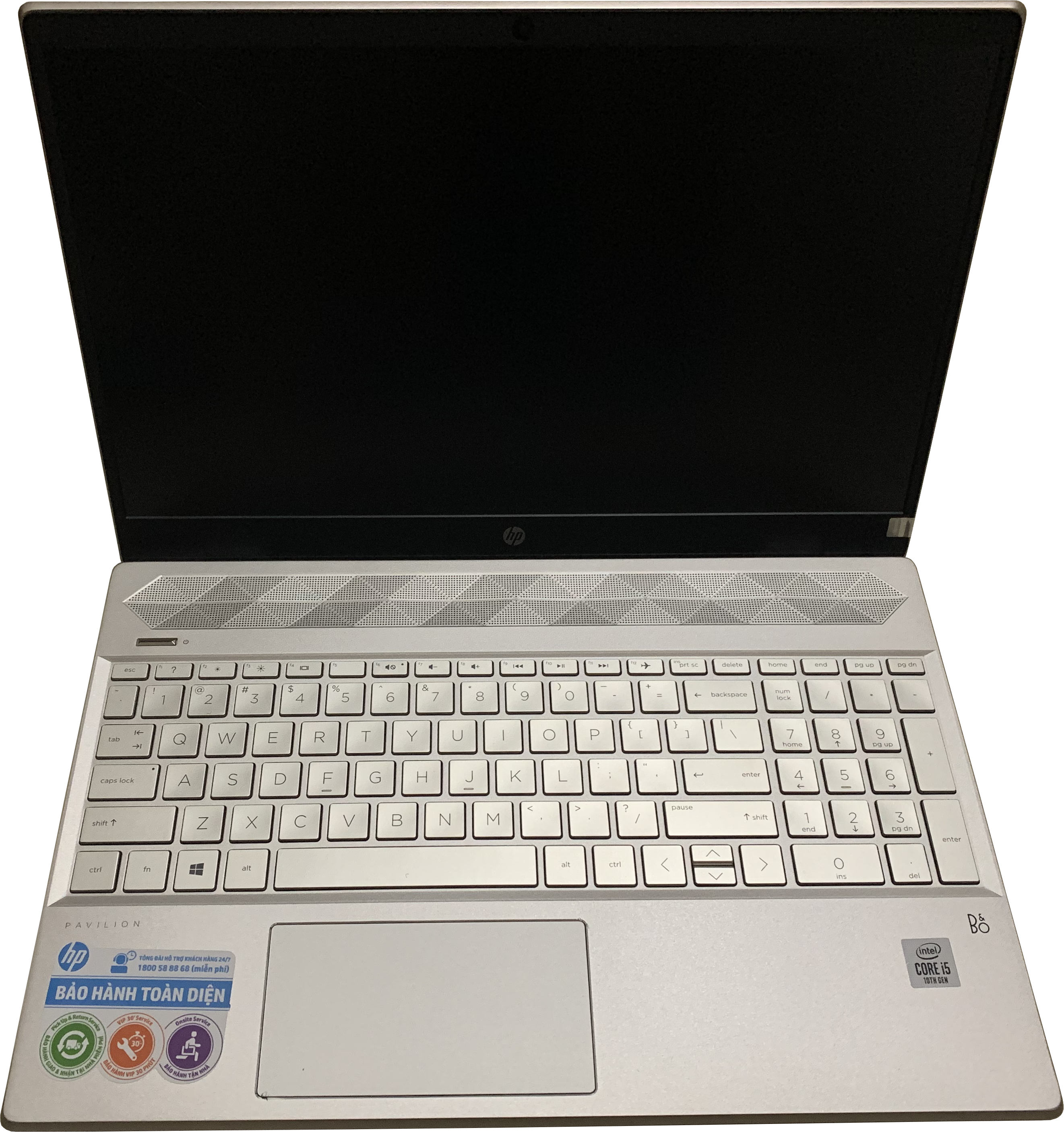
HP Pavilion 15 cs series (cs3095nr, 2019)

HP has also produced laptops and notebooks under the Pavilion brand name since 1999, which were sold up until 2026, when they were succeeded by the revived OmniBook series. Up until 2013, some models of the Pavilion laptops were produced with Compaq Presario branding.

The HP Pavilion laptops are only customizable in the United States. A variety of preconfigured models with different setups are available in other countries.

=== List of laptop models ===
(Note that is a non-exhaustive list and may never satisfy completeness but shows some of the more or less recent models under the Pavilion brand.)

==== HP Pavilion ====
- 20.1 inch: HDX9000
- 18.4 inch: HDX18t / dv8t
- 17.3 inch: ENVY 17 3D / ENVY 17 / dv7t / G72t / g7
- 17.0 inch: dv7 / g70t / dv9000 / dv8000 / zd8000 / zd7000
- 16.0 inch: HP G60-445DX / 16-af0077nr / 16-af0078nr / 16-af0087nr / 16-ag0087nr
- 15.6 inch: Compaq Presario (CQ60 / CQ62z), dv6t / dv6z / dv6zae (Artist Edition 2) HDX16t / G60t / G62t / G62m / g6 / m6 / 15-p077tx / 15-p001tx / 15-ck069tx 15-p005x / 15-p073tx / 15-p045tx / 15-p085tx / 15-r022tx / 15-r014tx / 15-r022tx / 15-d103tx / 15-p207tx / 15-p209tx / 15-p210tx / 15-p029tx / 15-p028tx / 15-p027tx / 15-f233wm / 15-n096sa / 15-ab165us / 15-cc5xx / 15-eg0073cl
- 15.4 inch: dv5 / dv6000 / dv5000 / dv4000 / zv6000 / zv5000 / zx5000 / ze5000 / ze4000 / zt3000
- 15.0 inch: ze2000 / ze1000 / zt1000 / ze5170 / N5195
- 14.5 inch: ENVY 14
- 14.3 inch: dv1658
- 14.1 inch: dv4t / dv4z / dv4tse / dv2000 / dv1000 / N3190
- 14.0 inch: dm4t / dm4x / G4t
- 13.3 inch: dm3t / Voodoo Envy 133 / dv3t / dv3z / dv3500t
- 12.1 inch: dv2z / N3150 / N3110; Tablet PC: tx series / TouchSmart tx2z / tm2t
- 11.6 inch: dm1t / dm1z

==== HP Pavilion x360 ====
The HP Pavilion x360 is a line of 2-in-1 laptops, which can be used in either a laptop or a tablet form factor.

- 14.0 inch: 14-ek2087nr

==== HP Pavilion Aero ====
The HP Pavilion Aero is a series of ultra lightweight laptops weighing less than 2.2 pounds.

- 13.3 inch: 13-bg0087nr

==== HP Pavilion Plus ====
- 16.0 inch: 16-ab0010nr / 16-ab1010nr
- 14.0 inch: 14-ew1010nr / 14-ey0047nr / 14-ey1067nr

==== HP Pavilion x2 ====
The HP Pavilion x2 is a long-running family of devices; there are dozens of variants, across many generations of Intel processors.

- 10.1 inch: HP Pavilion x2 Detachable (1280 x 800 touchscreen)

==== HP Mini ====
- 10.1 inch: HP Mini 1000 (Mi / XP / Mobile Broadband Wireless / Vivienne Tam) / HP Mini 210 / HP Mini 110 (Mi / XP)
- 8.9 inch: HP Mini 1000 (Mi / XP / Mobile Broadband Wireless)

=== Model number suffixes ===
The two or three letter suffix on the model number indicates special information like country or language (dv----xx). The following chart describes each suffix.

- t: Intel processor
- z: AMD processor
- ae: Artist Edition ("Artist Edition" imprint)
- bw: Broadband Wireless series
- sb: Small Business series
- se: Special Edition ("Intensity" dv4tse, "Renewal" dv5tse; "Special Edition" imprint)
- qe: Quad Edition (special quad-core processor, e.g. dv7tqe-6100 CTO with Intel i7)

The HP Pavilion HDX was only sold with Intel processors but does not end with the suffix "t" (it has no suffix). Likewise, the HP Pavilion TX tablet PC series was only sold with AMD processors but still ended with the suffix "z".

The following suffixes corresponds to the region where the notebook is sold.

- us: United States
- ca: Canada
- la: Latin America
- br: Brazil
- ea / ee / [e + other letter]: Europe / Middle East
- eo / so / no: Scandinavia
- ec / sc / nc: Czech Republic and Slovakia
- au / ax: Asia / Australia - AMD processor (AU = AMD + UMA graphics; AX = AMD + discrete graphics)
- tu / tx: Asia / Australia - Intel processor (TU = Intel + UMA; TX = Intel + discrete)
- ap: Asia Pacific

Other suffixes include:

- nr: no rebate
- cl: club model, available only through discount shopping clubs such as Costco and Sam's Club
- wm: Walmart model
- dx: Best Buy model
- od: Office Depot model
- st: Staples model
- tg: Target model

=== HP Imprint ===
HP Imprint was a high-gloss finish for laptop and notebook computers developed by Nissha Printing Co. of Japan in cooperation with HP. It was first developed in May 2006 alongside a new line of HP Pavilion laptops, using an advanced molding technique commonly used in several products such as mobile phone cases, interiors for luxury automobiles, etc., providing a durable yet fashionable design. Each unique designs for HP Imprint was directly inlaid onto the moldings.

An updated version of HP Imprint known as HP Imprint 2 was introduced in June 2008 alongside another new line of HP Pavilion laptops, featuring a liquid-metallic design. It continues to use the same advanced molding techniques as the original HP Imprint, as well as featuring several other unique designs not found in the original HP Imprint.

HP Imprint was used for the following models produced between 2006 and 2010:

- HP Imprint (2006–2008)
  - Wave: dv9000 / dv6000 / dv2000 / tx1000
  - Digi Code: Compaq Presario v3000
  - Trace: Compaq Presario v6700TX
  - Radiance: dv9700 / dv9500 / dv6700 / dv6500 / dv2700 / dv2500
  - Influx: dv6700tse / dv6500tse / dv2842se
  - Dragon: HDX9000
  - Verve: dv2700tse
  - Echo: tx2000z / tx2500z
  - Thrive: dv6800tse
  - Artist Edition: dv2800tae / dv2890nr / dv2990nr
- HP Imprint 2 (2008–2010)
  - Meshy: dv7 / dv6 / dv5 / dv4 / dv3000
  - Unity: Compaq Presario CQ20
  - Glossy Black Finish: Compaq Presario (CQ70 / CQ50 / CQ40)
  - Fluid: HDX18t / HDX16t
  - Intensity: dv4tse
  - Renewal: dv5tse
  - Intersect: dv7 / dv5 / dv4 / dv3500 / dv3
  - Swirl: HP Mini 1000 (Mi / XP / Mobile Broadband Wireless)
  - Peony: HP Mini 1000 (Vivienne Tam)
  - Reaction: HP TouchSmart tx2z
  - Moonlight: dv7 / dv4 / dv2z / dv6
  - Espresso: dv7 / dv4 / dv2z / dv6

=== Notebook artwork competition ===
In 2007, HP held a contest in conjunction with MTV to help design a unique case artwork for a special edition HP notebook PC, which ran from September 5 to October 17 with over 8,500 designs from 112 countries submitted. The winner was João Oliveira from Porto, Portugal, who created a design called "Asian Odyssey"; this winning design would be implemented on a special HP Pavilion dv2800tae "Artist Edition" notebook released in the spring of 2008. In 2008, HP launched the "Engine Room", which was another notebook art competition that ran with over 17,000 designs from 94 countries submitted. Hisako Sakihama of Japan won the contest, and his design, described as the "sea and sky of Okinawa", would appear on a limited-edition HP "Artist Edition" notebook PC released in 2009.

=== Specialized features ===
==== QuickPlay ====
From 2004 to 2009, several models of HP Pavilion laptops (most notably the dv series) featured HP's Linux-based software called QuickPlay, which allows the playback of multimedia without booting into an operating system. It includes several multimedia-related features, and has a much faster boot time on startup (at approximately ~12 seconds). A version of QuickPlay for Windows was also developed, featuring the same multimedia functions as the standard Linux-based version while also providing some additional ones such as pause playback via the included remote control. The Windows version of QuickPlay was offered in both Windows XP and Windows Vista versions. On models with Windows Vista preinstalled, the Linux-based version of QuickPlay cannot be launched on startup due to some unresolved compatibility issues, but the Windows version of QuickPlay was still included on said models due to it having many features from its Linux-based counterpart. This software has since been discontinued, being replaced by the HP MediaSmart Software that was installed on all HP desktops and notebooks from 2009 up until the early-to-mid 2010s.

=== Overheating issues ===
Many laptop and notebook owners experienced hardware failure in various Pavilion models produced during the late 2000s due to overheating. Symptoms of an overheating system include missing Wi-Fi, to the failure of the graphics card chipsets and booting problems. HP acknowledges this as a "hardware issue" on several laptop/notebook models (most notably the dv2000/dv6000/dv9000 series), which are eligible for free repair. Other users have recommended a resoldering of the Nvidia GPUs on the motherboard due to the overheating causing the solder of the built-in GPU to liquify. In 2009, HP had to recall over 70,000 batteries that were defective as a result of overheating.

== Logo history ==
1995–2001

2000–2004 (primary), 2004–2007 (secondary)

2000–2004 (secondary), 2004–2013 (primary)

2012–2013

2013–2016

2016–2026
