= Quickplay Media =

Canadian video streaming technology company

Quickplay
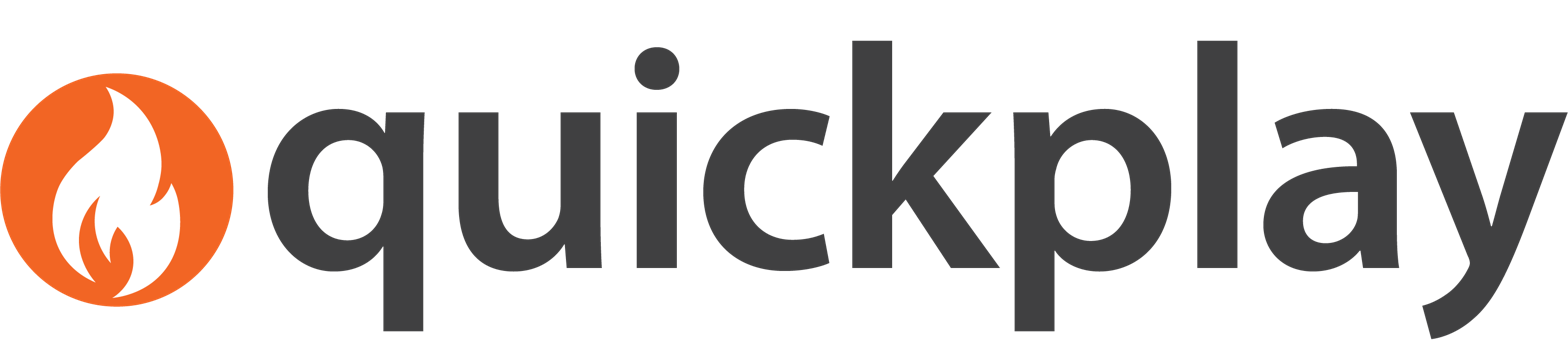
- Founded: 2004
- Headquarters: Toronto, Ontario, Canada
- Products: Streaming video delivery software
- Website: quickplay.com

Quickplay (formerly known as Quickplay Media and branded as Firstlight Media from 2020 to 2022) is a Canadian video streaming technology company that develops software used to deliver video content to internet-connected devices.

== History ==
In 2012, private equity firm Madison Dearborn Partners acquired a majority stake in Quickplay Media for about US$100 million.

In May 2016, AT&T agreed to acquire Quickplay from Madison Dearborn Partners; financial terms were not disclosed.

In March 2020, AT&T agreed to sell Quickplay to Firstlight Media, backed by Highview Capital Partners, and the businesses were combined under the Firstlight Media name. In August 2022, Firstlight Media rebranded as Quickplay.
