= Extended Video Graphics Array =

Computer display standard

Extended Video Graphics Array (EVGA)
- Release date: 1991; 34 years ago

History
- Predecessor: Video Graphics Array

Extended Video Graphics Array (or EVGA) is a standard created by VESA in 1991 (VBE 1.2) denoting a non-interlaced resolution of 1024x768 at a maximum of 70 Hz refresh rate.

EVGA is similar to (but is not the same as) the IBM XGA standard. The 1990s were a period of evolving standards and EVGA did not achieve wide adoption.

== See also ==
- Display resolution standards
- Super VGA
- IBM 8514
- Extended Graphics Array
- Expanded Graphics Adapter (IBM 3270 PC peripheral, also referred as XGA)
