= Surface Pro (2017) =

Microsoft hybrid notebook computer

- Also known as: Surface Pro 5
- Developer: Microsoft
- Product family: Surface
- Type: 2-in-1 detachable
- Generation: Fifth
- Released: June 15, 2017
- Introductory price: $799 (£749)
- Operating system: Windows 10 Pro
- CPU: Intel Kaby Lake low-voltage dual-core: m3-7Y30; 1.0 up to 2.6 GHz, 4 MB cache, 4.5 W i5-7300U; 2.6 up to 3.5 GHz, 3 MB cache, 15 W i7-7660U; 2.5 up to 4.0 GHz, 4 MB cache, 15 W
- Memory: 4 GB, 8 GB, or 16 GB
- Storage: PCIe NVMe SSD in 128 GB, 256 GB, 512 GB, or 1 TB capacities
- Display: 12.3 in (31 cm) 2736x1824 (267 ppi) 'PixelSense' display with 3:2 aspect ratio with 10-point multi-touch and pen support
- Graphics: m3: Intel HD Graphics 615 i5: Intel HD Graphics 620 i7: Intel Iris Plus Graphics 640
- Dimensions: 292 mm × 201 mm × 8.5 mm (11.50 in × 7.91 in × 0.33 in)
- Weight: m3: 768 g (1.693 lb) i5: 770 g (1.70 lb) i7: 784 g (1.728 lb)
- Predecessor: Surface Pro 4
- Successor: Surface Pro 6

The fifth-generation Surface Pro (marketed as the Surface Pro, colloquially referred to as the Surface Pro 2017 or Surface Pro 5) is a Surface-series 2-in-1 detachable hybrid notebook computer, designed, developed, marketed, and produced by Microsoft. The Surface Pro was announced in May 2017 at a public event held in Shanghai, China. The device launched in 26 different markets on June 15.

== Configuration ==
Configurations
Price tier (USD)	CPU	GPU	Internal storage	RAM	LTE
$799	Intel Core m3-7Y30 (1.0 to 2.6 GHz)	HD 615	128 GB	4 GB	No
$849	Intel Core i5-7300U (2.6 to 3.5 GHz)	HD 620	128 GB	4 GB	No
$999	Intel Core i5-7300U (2.6 to 3.5 GHz)	HD 620	128 GB	8 GB	No
$1,149	Intel Core i5-7300U (2.6 to 3.5 GHz)	HD 620	128 GB	4 GB	Yes
$1,299	Intel Core i5-7300U (2.6 to 3.5 GHz)	HD 620	256 GB	8 GB	No
$1,449	Intel Core i5-7300U (2.6 to 3.5 GHz)	HD 620	256 GB	8 GB	Yes
$1,499	Intel Core i5-7300U (2.6 to 3.5 GHz)	HD 620	256 GB	16 GB	No
$1,599	Intel Core i7-7660U (2.5 to 4.0 GHz)	Iris Plus 640	256 GB	8 GB	No
$2,199	Intel Core i7-7660U (2.5 to 4.0 GHz)	Iris Plus 640	512 GB	16 GB	No
$2,699	Intel Core i7-7660U (2.5 to 4.0 GHz)	Iris Plus 640	1 TB	16 GB	No

== Hardware ==
All Surface Pro models feature 7th-generation Intel Kaby Lake Core processors – m3, i5, or i7 – which feature higher clock speeds over the Intel Skylake processors found in its predecessor. The new Kaby Lake chips also feature improved Speed Shift technology, allowing the processor to transition between CPU states quicker. For the first time, both the Core m3 and the Core i5 models are fanless.

RAM options are 4, 8, and 16 GB, and SSD options are 128, 256, and 512 GB and 1 TB. These are the same tiers that were available with Surface Pro 4. (Note, however, that not all RAM options are available with all SSD options.)

In addition, the new Surface Pro features an enhanced kickstand which now opens to 165 degrees, allowing the device to lay flatter – a mode that Microsoft calls Studio Mode. Alongside the 802.11a/b/g/n/ac Wi-Fi radio, Bluetooth 4.1 Low Energy, there will now also be the option to purchase the Surface Pro with an LTE Advanced modem for cellular connectivity.

There is also a full-size USB 3.0 port, microSD card reader, headset jack, Mini DisplayPort, Cover Port, and the SurfaceConnect port to connect a wall charger, Docking Station or Surface Dock accessories.

== Software ==
All Surface Pro models (except in mainland China and Japan) come with a 64-bit version of Windows 10 Pro and a Microsoft Office 365 30-day trial. Windows 10 comes pre-installed with Mail, Calendar, People, Xbox (app), Photos, Movies and TV, Groove, and Microsoft Edge. With Windows 10, a "Tablet mode" is available when the Type Cover is detached from the device. In this mode, all windows are opened full-screen and the interface becomes more touch-centric.

In mainland China, all Surface Pro models come with a 64-bit version of Windows 10 Home and a Microsoft Office 2016 Home & Student edition. Devices with Windows 10 Pro are only available for enterprise.

In Japan, all Surface Pro models come with a 64-bit version of Windows 10 Pro and a Microsoft Office Home & Business 2016.

The device also has a Windows Hello-compatible camera. It combines the use of a regular and infrared cameras to authenticate the user.

== Accessories ==
Microsoft introduced a collection of new Type Covers, which employs the same Alcantara material as the Surface Signature Type Cover used in the Surface Laptop and Surface Pro 4 and is available in four different color options.

An updated version of the Surface Pen has also been introduced, including up to 4096 levels of pressure and tilt support. Microsoft claims it is the "fastest pen in the world", with only 21 milliseconds of latency. Unlike previous models, this new version of the "Surface Pen" does not come included with the new Surface Pro.

The new Surface Pro is backward-compatible with all accessories of its predecessor models, such as the Surface Dial. The new Surface Type Cover and Surface Pen are also being made backward-compatible with older models such as the Surface Pro 4 and Surface Pro 3.

== Known issues ==
There was a Surface Pro issue where it had been prone to randomly hibernate and resume shortly afterwards without warning. This issue is mentioned on answers.microsoft.com and can be fixed by installing the latest Windows updates.

Additionally, users have noted a significant and widespread "backlight bleed" in which the backlight from the Surface Pro's screen is visible on solid-colored backgrounds.

== Reception ==
Ryan Shrout of PC Perspective wrote that "from a flexibility perspective, there is no denying the Windows 10 advantage for consumers, students, and business users" over iOS.

== Timeline ==
Timeline of Surface devices
Sources: Microsoft Devices Blog Microsoft Surface Store Microsoft Surface for Business store

Preceded by Surface Pro 4	Surface Pro; 5th generation With: Surface Laptop; Surface Book	Succeeded by Surface Pro 6
