= List of Microsoft Surface accessories =

Microsoft Surface is a family of touchscreen Windows computers and interactive whiteboards designed and developed by Microsoft. Since its release in 2012, there have been various Surface accessories over the years. Most prominently, are the Surface keyboard covers and the Surface Pen, which were both introduced at launch. While the keyboard covers have all been sold independently of the Surface devices, the initial release of the Surface and Surface Pro had bundle options, which bundled the black Touch Cover. The Surface Pen has been included with all Surface line and Surface Pro line devices up until the release of the fifth-generation Surface Pro, where Microsoft decided to unbundle the Surface Pen.

== Accessories ==
=== Surface Touch Cover ===
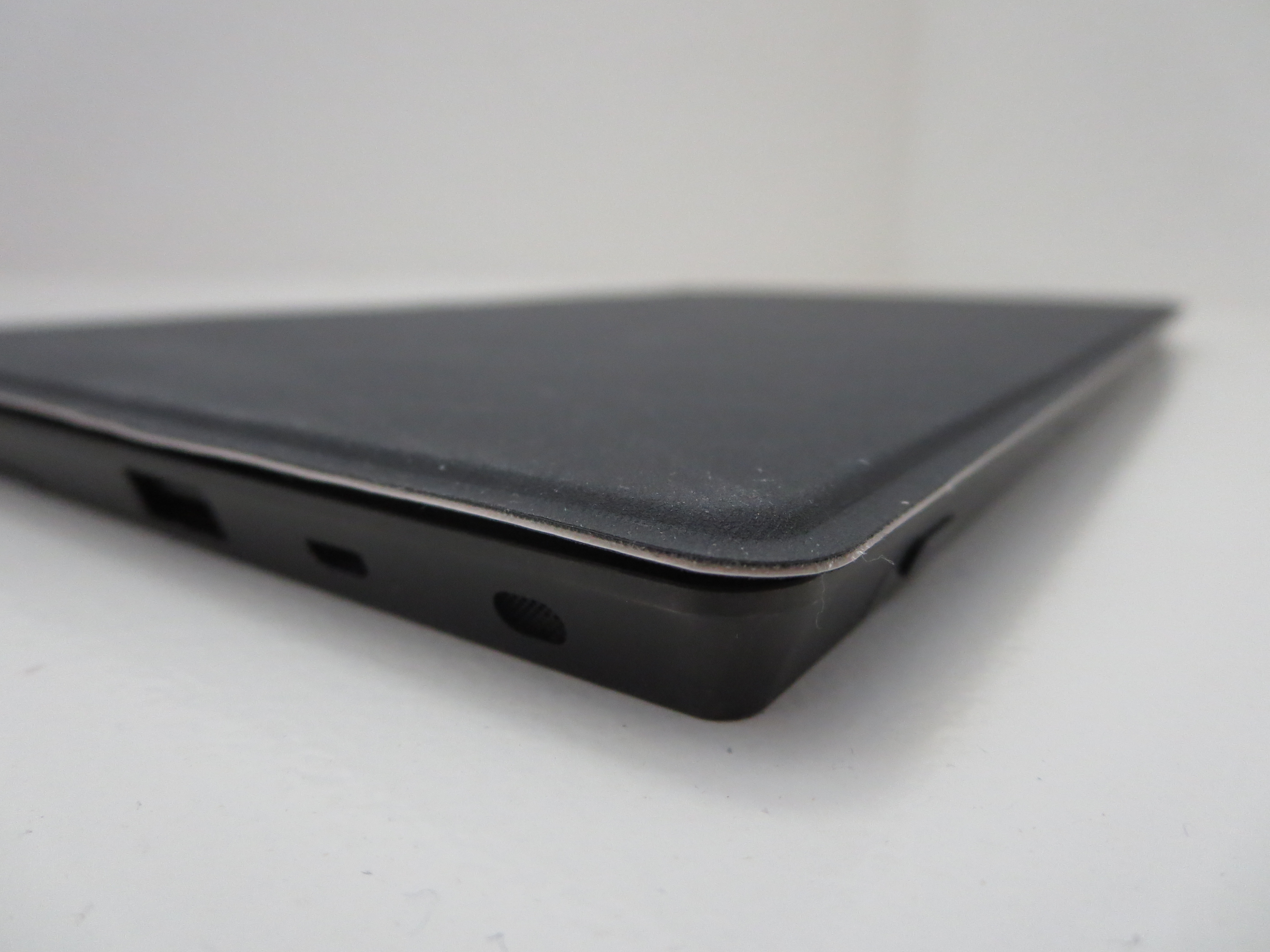

The original touch cover came with 80 touch sensors and was pressure sensitive. With the release of the Surface 2 a Touch Cover 2 was announced which increased the number of sensors to 1,092 and added backlit keys while being thinner than the original Touch Cover. In addition, the Touch Cover 2 also supported key gestures and was backwards compatible with the first generation Surface devices. Microsoft never made another Touch Cover after the release of the Surface Pro 3.

It is compatible with the Surface 2.

=== Type Cover ===
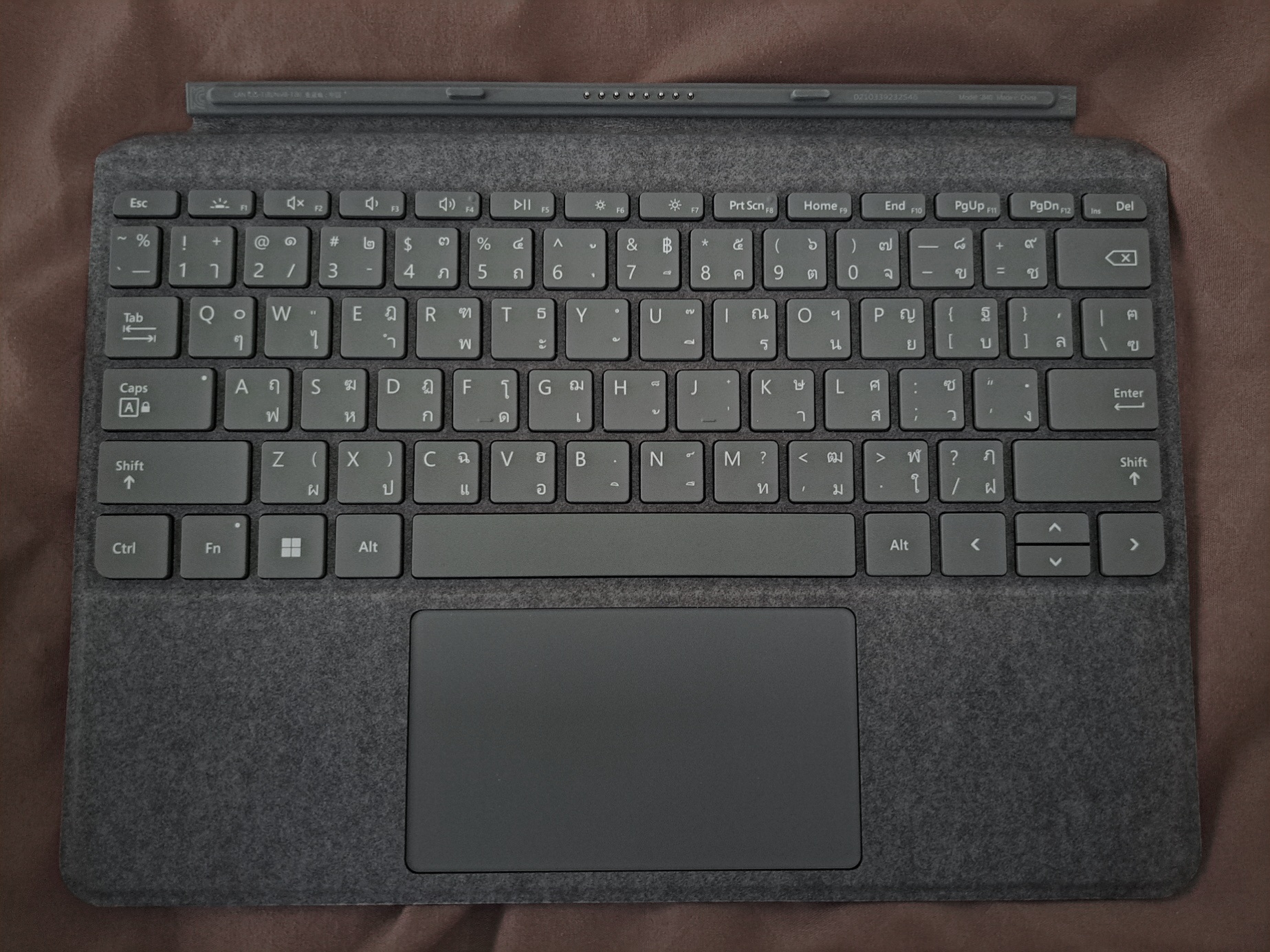

With the release of the first generation Surface Pro, Microsoft launched the Type Cover which has tactile keys. It was upgraded along with the second generation Surfaces to the Type Cover 2 which substituted the plastic material for the felt-like material found on the Type Covers. The Type Cover 2 is thinner and features back-lit keys. With the release of the Surface Pro 3, a newer cover called the Surface Pro 3 Type Cover was released to fit the bigger screen. The Surface Pro 3 Type Cover features a second magnetized strip that can be rested against the screen to prop the keyboard up at an angle. The Surface Pro 3 Type Cover has a touchpad with glass beads replacing the felt-like material used in previous generations. When the Surface 3 was announced, a smaller version, the Surface 3 Type Cover was released. Both Surface 3 and Pro 3 Type Covers have a loop to house the Surface Pen.

On October 6, 2015, Microsoft updated the Surface Pro Type Cover with a new teal color in addition to the existing black, red, blue, and bright blue colors. Also introduced was a function lock light, separated keys, and a 40% larger touchpad than previous models. A "Fingerprint ID" version was also announced but is only available in the color black. Both are backwards compatible with the Surface Pro 3, though both are designed for the Surface Pro 4. A Signature Type Cover designed out of grey Alcantara was announced on April 12, 2016.

With the launch of the fifth-generation Surface Pro, Microsoft expanded the Surface Pro Signature Type Cover line to include burgundy, cobalt blue, and platinum with a release date of June 15, 2017.

- Surface Pro 3
- Surface Pro 4
- Surface Pro (5th generation)
- Surface Pro 6

=== Power Cover ===
A Power Cover, introduced alongside the Surface Pro 2, is a non back-lit Type Cover with a built-in battery to extend the Surface's battery life. It is compatible with the Surface Pro and later, due to the additional pins required on the Surface spine. A Wireless Adapter for the keyboards, called the Wireless Adapter for Typing Covers, was also manufactured so that the keyboards can be used at a distance. It was introduced in September 2013 and has been discontinued on March 26, 2014.

=== Surface Keyboard ===
In 2018, Microsoft launched the Surface Keyboard alongside the Surface Mouse, which is compatible with any Bluetooth enabled device

=== Surface Mouse ===
Two mice have also been released for the Surface including the Wedge Touch and Arc Touch mice. On July 10, 2018, Microsoft launched the Surface Mouse alongside the Surface Keyboard. It is compatible with any Bluetooth-enabled device.

=== Surface Pen ===
Most Surface tablets have an active pen that allows users to write directly onto the screen of the tablet. The Surface Pen for the Surface Pro and Surface Pro 2 use Wacom technology, while its successor released alongside the Surface Pro 3 and newer devices use that of N-trig, which has since been acquired by Microsoft. The Surface Pen was specifically designed to minimize latency (lag time), eliminate parallax issues, which occur when the point where the tip touches the screen does not match up with the spot where the ink actually appears on the device, and provide a more natural-feeling 'pen-on-paper' user experience. The Surface also features palm rejection which allows the user to rest his or her palm on the screen while using the Surface Pen without triggering an unwanted input. It is compatible with any Bluetooth-enabled device.

=== Surface Dock ===
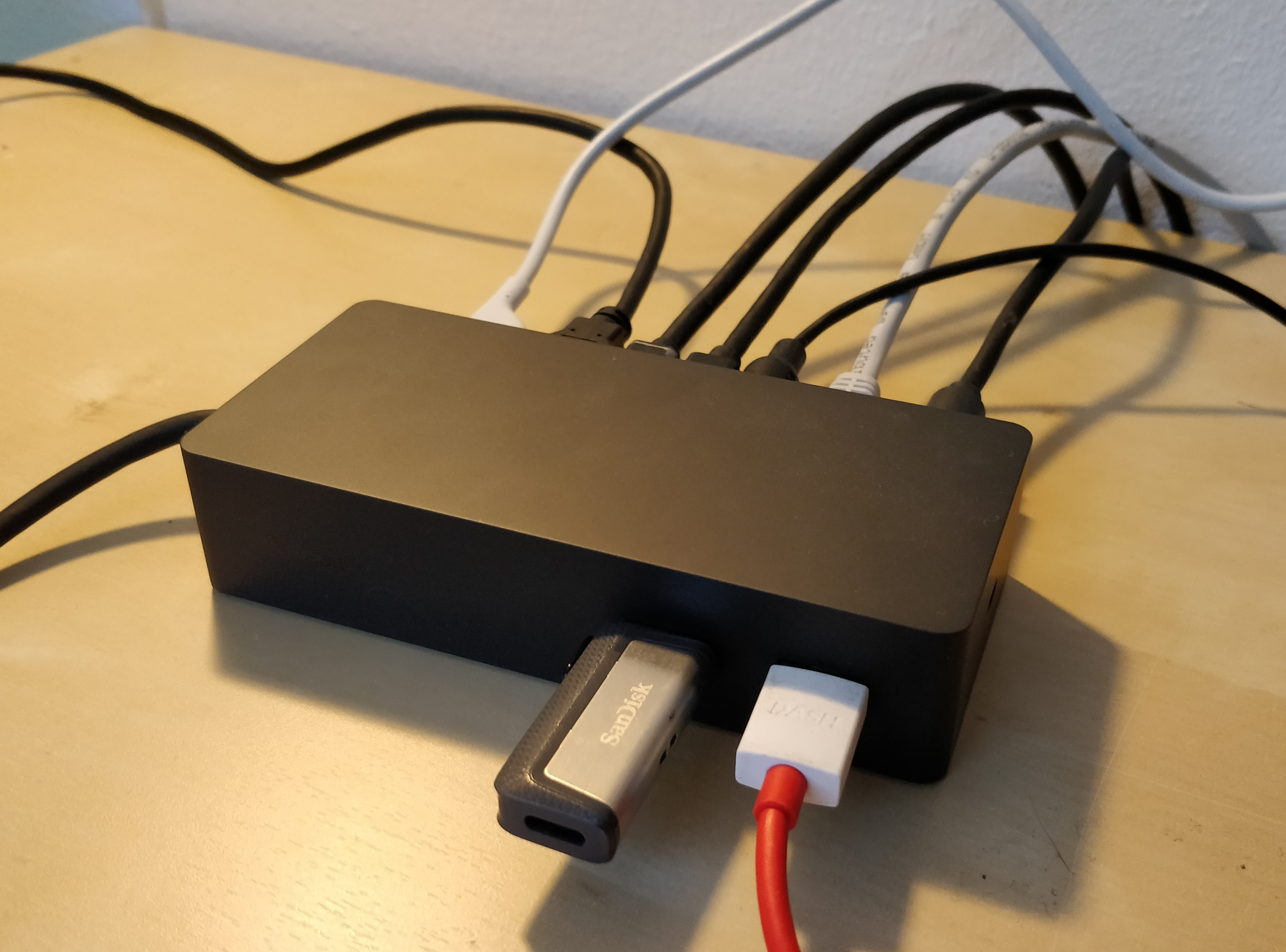

There are various Docking Stations for different Surface Laptop devices, which are optional non-included accessories. They each extend the Surface with a number of USB ports, additional audio sockets, a Gigabit Ethernet port and a selection of ports to connect external displays. As of April 2023, while the only two discontinued Docks are for Surface Pro 1-3 and Surface 3, the latest model is the Surface Thunderbolt 4 Dock.

==== Prior Surface Docks (Surface Pro 1/2/3, Surface 3 only) ====
The initial design of the Surface Dock had a diagonal tablet stand permanently set at 60 degrees for the device to rest in while two arms slid together to secure the device and plug into all of the tablet ports. Of note, the Surface Dock for Surface 3 and Surface Pro 3 used a new 40-pin interconnect on the right arm of the dock to join the device to the docking station for charging and port replication use. The port featured in several generations of Surface Devices afterward.

==== Surface Dock (Brick) ====
With the announcement of the Surface Pro 4 and Surface Book, Microsoft revealed a new Surface Dock accessory in a brick form factor which is compatible with Surface 3 and the Surface Pro 3. This docking accessory connects to the proprietary 40-pin side port which got the new name – Surface Connect. Unlike the prior docks, the Surface Dock offered two Mini-DisplayPort outputs, but had a limit of SD/HD/2K video at 60 Hz or 4K video at 30 Hz, regardless of the screens used. Surface Dock compatibility includes all Pro devices from Surface Pro 3 up to and including Surface Pro 9. It also includes Surface Book 1 & 2, and all initial Surface Laptops, Surface Go, and Surface Laptop Go devices.

A Microsoft Garage incubator team designed ergonomic VESA-mounted portrait docking stations as part of the Company hackathon, released a YouTube demo video, open-source plans on GitHub, and made ready-to-use kits available on a web store.

==== Surface Dock 2 ====
An update to the first brick Surface Dock, the Surface Dock 2 was released in 2021 and replaced the Mini-DP video outputs with USB-C DP-Alt Mode outputs. The Surface Book 3, Surface Pro 7–9, Surface Pro X, Surface Laptop 3-5 and Surface Laptop Studio all have 4K at 60 Hz support on up to two displays with Surface Dock 2. It also offered the same compatibility to older devices that worked on Surface Dock 1, however, the same limitations in video output remained on Surface Dock 2 (2K at 60 Hz, 4K at 30 Hz) due largely to integrated video output limits on reduced voltage.

==== Surface Travel Hub ====
A USB-C "travel dock" was released at the same time as Surface Dock 2 with lower power usage and five ports: Ethernet, HDMI, VGA, USB-A and USB-C (charging limited to 12W.) Unlike the Surface Docks, the Travel Hub connects to Surface Devices with USB-C ports including the Surface Pro 7, Surface Book 2, Surface Go, Surface Laptop Go, Surface Laptop 3, and Surface Laptop Studio.

==== Surface Thunderbolt 4 Dock ====
The third brick Surface Dock was released in 2023, which introduced a new USB-C Upstream cable permanently attached to the dock to replace the 40-pin Surface Connect plug. This dock is compatible with select USB-C devices starting with Surface Pro 7–9, Surface Pro X, Surface Laptop 3–5, Surface Book 3, Surface Laptop Go 1–2, Surface Go 2–3, and Surface Laptop Studio. Not all of these devices actually offer Thunderbolt 4. Surface Laptop 5, Surface Pro 8-9 and Surface Laptop Studio are the only four devices with TB4/USB4 support.

Devices older than these models are not supported on the Surface Thunderbolt 4 Dock, notably the Surface Book 2 (which has a USB-C port that does not support Thunderbolt connectivity).

==== Surface USB4 Dock ====
The fourth brick-style Surface Dock was released in 2025. While similar in functionality to the earlier Thunderbolt 4 dock, it is smaller, weighs about half as much, includes fewer ports, and restricts laptop power delivery to ~60W. While suitable for various Surface Pro and Surface Laptop models, the 60W power delivery limits performance of larger laptops such as the Laptop Studio series.

=== Surface Connect to USB-C Adapter ===
In addition to the Surface Dock, Microsoft has released a USB-C adapter that allows the Surface Pro and Surface Laptop to use generic USB-C docking stations with the Surface Connect port. The adapter, styled the same as the Surface Dock "brick" supports USB 3, Display Port alternate mode, and charging via USB Power Delivery. Charging requires USB power sources that output 12V, 15V, or 20V. Most cell phone and tablet chargers at the time did not support these voltage levels, however USB-PD Chargers sold today that offer at least 45W output are able to charge lower-voltage Surface devices while in use. The adapter could also maintain power to Surface Book models and Surface Laptop 3-5 while powered on (maximum USB-PD output to device is 40W).

=== Microsoft Wireless Display Adapter ===
Microsoft created and released the Wireless Display Adapter accessory in 2014 along with Surface 3 and Surface Pro 3 that uses Miracast (Wi-Fi Direct) to display an HDMI-quality Wireless Video connection from a Surface device. It also works any device that supports Miracast, including laptops that were formerly certified with Intel's WiDi technology.

The Wireless Display Adapter cannot transmit video from a desktop computer (or any other hardware not certified by Miracast before public sale) or on any device sold by a manufacturer who does not participate in the Miracast hardware standard. This includes all Apple laptops and devices, all Google Chromebooks, and Android devices starting with Android 8. However, individual handset manufacturers using Android can still certify a device to work with Miracast, such as Samsung's Galaxy S line.

To maintain HDCP support, devices that do not have current software driver updates will not connect to the Wireless Display Adapter (even if Miracast is supported).

- Version 1 (long HDMI stick and short USB dongle) was released in 2014, which supported 1080p video at 30fps wirelessly, and HDMI-CEC control to automatically power on a TV and change input to the adapter when used.
- Version 2 (HDMI and USB dongles both equal length, clear cap to plug both into each other for storage) released in 2016 added 1080/60fps support, control modes for gaming, video and work settings, and control channel support on touchpanel IFP displays such as ViewSonic, Benq, and Promethean (touchscreen input can control a Miracast device wirelessly from the display same as mouse/pen input.)
- Version 3 (rectangular with individual HDMI and USB wires) was made available in 2020 with a longer USB wire to enable better reach on TVs with USB ports further away from HDMI input. Version 3 also added 4K support (3840x2160 at 30fps).

=== Surface Dial ===
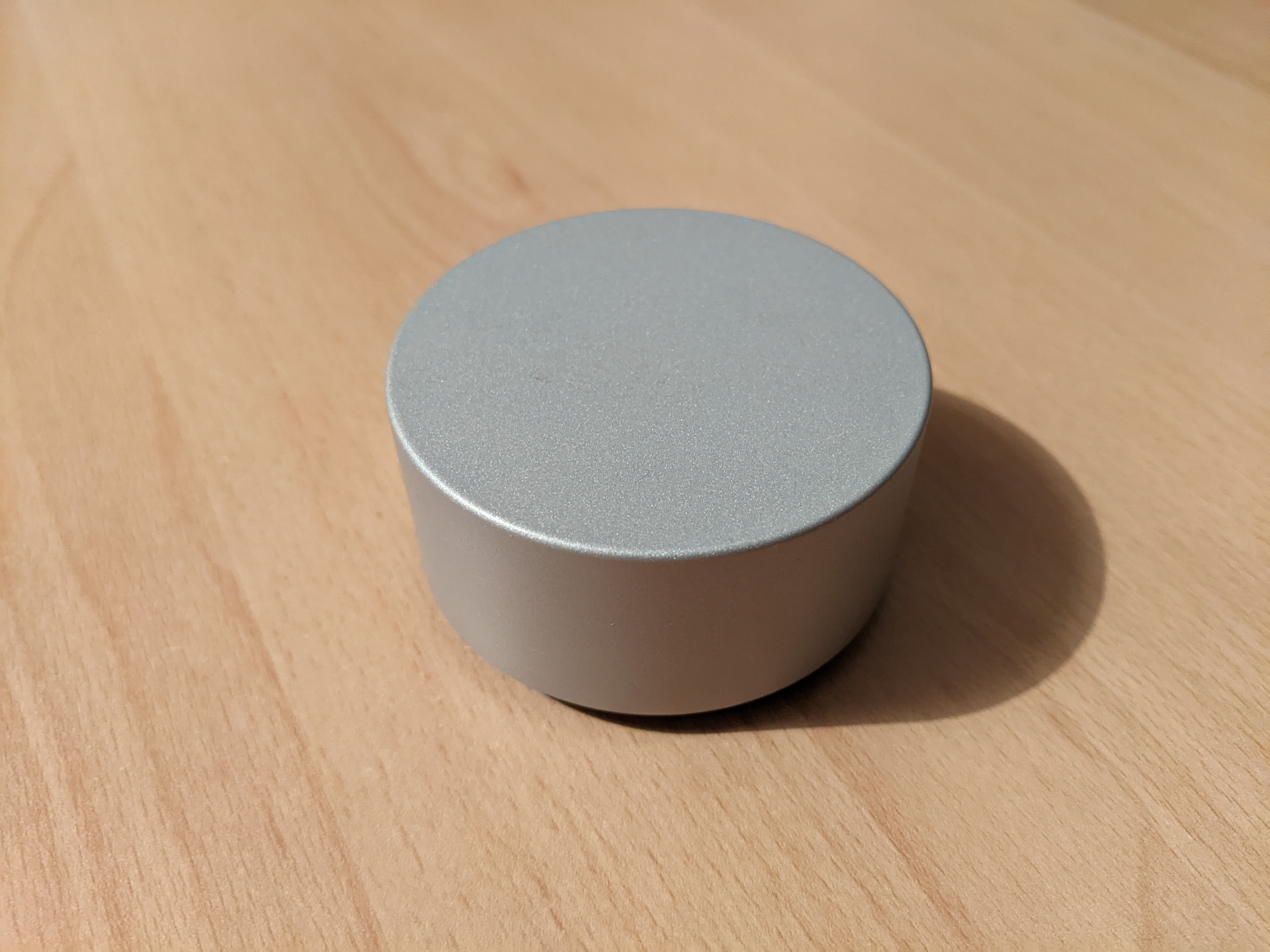

With the introduction of the Surface Studio on 26 October 2016, Microsoft announced a new type of computing device called the Surface Dial. The promoted Surface Dial's purpose is to be used to control functions that artists might find useful, such as pen color or thickness. The Surface Dial is set with standard commands that can be used without being program or app specific. These commands include toggling sound volume, scrolling, zooming, brightness, and undo/redo. However, an app developer can customize the wheel's abilities, when developing apps. Some third-party applications that were included in the Surface Dial launch include Drawboard PDF, Sketchable, StaffPad and Mental Canvas Player. The Surface Dial works on the screen of the Surface Studio, Surface Book 2 and Surface Pro 2017 and off-screen with other Windows 10 devices (that support Bluetooth 4.0 LE) as well including the Surface Book and Surface Pro 4. Microsoft's Terry Myerson told Engadget that a firmware update will be released in early-2017 for the Surface Book and Surface Pro 4 that will allow the on-screen functions to work with those devices.

Surface Dial, like the Surface Pen, utilize non-rechargeable batteries, though the Dial requires the two included AAA alkaline batteries, and the Surface Pen requires a single AAAA battery. Surface Dial requires the Windows 10 "Anniversary Update" in order to function.

The Dial is compatible with the Surface Pro 4, Surface Studio, Surface Pro (2017), and Surface Book 2.

=== Surface Headphones ===
On October 2, 2018, Microsoft unveiled Bluetooth-compatible Surface Headphones alongside the Surface Pro 6, Surface Laptop 2 and Surface Studio 2. The noise-cancelling Bluetooth headphones feature Cortana integration and four beam-forming microphones.

On August 15, 2020, Microsoft introduced Surface Headphones 2, compatible with Windows 10 and Windows 11 Home/Pro with the latest updates. It's also compatible with Bluetooth 4.1/4.2/5.0, IOS 12 or 13, Android 9 or 10.

=== Surface Earbuds ===
Microsoft released wireless earbuds in 2019 that feature a "dish-looking apparatus" on the outside for touch interactions. The earbuds can also live transcribe a PowerPoint presentation from a connected computer. Like the aforementioned headphones, these are compatible to Bluetooth.

=== Other accessories ===
There are many other accessories for the Microsoft Surface.

Microsoft launched a Surface HD Digital A/V Adapter which works with micro-HDMI to HDMI for the Surface and Surface 2, and a Surface VGA adapter which also works with Surface and Surface 2 going from the built-in micro-HDMI to VGA.

For the Surface Pro series, a Display Port to HD A/V (HDMI) and a Display Port to VGA adapter was created. For the first generation Surface, a 32 watt power supply was included, which was upgraded with the Surface 2 to feature a larger indicator light to show the Surface was charging. The Surface Pro and Pro 2 feature a 48 watt power supply with a USB (power only) port on the charging brick. As with the Surface 2's power supply, the Pro 2's power supply features a larger indicator light. Microsoft redesigned the power supply for the Surface Pro 3 with a new "fin" connector and a 36 watt rating.

The Surface 3 launched with another redesigned power supply using a micro-USB connector and having a 13 watt rating.

Two Ethernet adapters have been released to work with the Surface Pro line including the Ethernet Adapter for USB 2.0 with a speed rating of 100 Mbit/s and a Surface Ethernet Adapter for USB 3.0 with a speed of 1 Gbit/s.

For the Surface Pro 8 series and newer devices, a Surface Slim Pen Charging Cradle has been released for users to charge the slim pen without a Touch Keyboard attached. The charger uses USB-C at the base. The cradle charges a Slim Pen wirelessly with any USB-PD charging adapter that is capable of at least 5W.
