= Surface Pro 6 =

2018 tablet computer by Microsoft

- Developer: Microsoft
- Product family: Microsoft Surface
- Type: 2-in-1 detachable
- Generation: Sixth
- Released: October 16, 2018; 7 years ago
- Introductory price: USD 899 to 2,299
- Operating system: Windows 10 Home Consumer; Windows 10 Pro Business
- CPU: Intel Core i5-8250U; Intel Core i5-8350U; Intel Core i7-8650U
- Memory: 16 GB, 8 GB RAM
- Storage: 1 TB, 512 GB, 256 GB, 128 GB SSD
- Removable storage: microSD
- Display: 12.3 inch touchscreen PixelSense Display; 2736 x 1824, 267 PPI; 3:2 Aspect Ratio
- Graphics: UHD Graphics 620
- Sound: 1.6 W stereo speakers with Dolby Audio, 3.5 mm headphone jack, Dual microphones
- Input: Built in: touchscreen, ambient light sensor, accelerometer, gyroscope Sold Separately: type cover, mouse, stylus pen, Surface Dial
- Camera: Front: 5 MP, 1080p HD; Rear: 8 MP, 1080p HD
- Touchpad: On the Surface Type Cover (sold separately)
- Connectivity: WiFi 5, Bluetooth 4.1, Mini DisplayPort
- Online services: Microsoft Store, OneDrive
- Dimensions: 292 mm x 201 mm x 8.5 mm (11.5 in x 7.9 in x 0.33 in)
- Weight: i5: 770 g (1.70 lb) i7: 784 g (1.728 lb)
- Predecessor: Surface Pro 5th Gen
- Successor: Surface Pro 7
- Related: Surface
- Website: www.surface.com

The Surface Pro 6 is a 2-in-1 detachable tablet computer developed by Microsoft. It is the sixth generation of Surface Pro and was announced alongside the Surface Laptop 2 on October 2, 2018 at an event in New York. It was released on 16th of that same month.

== Configurations ==
Surface Pro 6 Configuration Options
Price tier in USD		CPU	GPU	RAM	Internal storage	Color
Consumer	Business	CPU	GPU	RAM	Internal storage	Color
$899	$999	Intel Core i5 8250U for Consumer; 8350U for Business	Intel UHD Graphics 620	8 GB	128 GB	P
$1,199	$1,299	Intel Core i5 8250U for Consumer; 8350U for Business	Intel UHD Graphics 620	8 GB	256 GB	P B
$1,399	$1,499	Intel Core i5 8250U for Consumer; 8350U for Business	Intel UHD Graphics 620	16 GB	256 GB	P
$1,499	$1,549	Intel Core i7 8650U	Intel UHD Graphics 620	8 GB	256 GB	P B
$1,899	$1,949	Intel Core i7 8650U	Intel UHD Graphics 620	16 GB	512 GB	P B
$2,299	$2,349	Intel Core i7 8650U	Intel UHD Graphics 620	16 GB	1 TB	P

Platinum Black

== Features ==
=== Hardware ===
This sixth generation Surface computer line has all been updated to Intel's eighth generation Kaby Lake Refresh Core-i5 and Core-i7 CPUs. It is available with either 8 or 16 GB of RAM, 128 GB, 256 GB, 512 GB or 1 TB of Solid State Storage, and business or consumer models. Business models are pre-installed with Windows 10 Pro while Consumer SKUs are pre-installed with Windows 10 Home.

The port configuration on the Surface Pro 6 remains the same as previous generations with one Surface Connect, USB 3.0 type-A port, one Mini DisplayPort, a 3.5 mm headphone jack, and a microSD card reader. Unlike the Surface Go, a USB-C port is not present on the Surface Pro 6. The optional Surface type cover attaches to a magnetic pin port at the bottom of the device which is identical physically to the previous Surface Pro model.

The Surface Pro 6 features a 12.3 inch PixelSense display with a resolution of 2736x1824. Unlike its predecessors, that used Sharp sourced displays, the Surface Pro 6 display is made by LG.

The Surface Pro 6 brings back the Matte Black color option, an option previously not seen since the original Surface Pro.

When the brightness is changed to 200 nits, the Surface Pro 6 draws 5W of power. When being charged, the Surface Pro 6 has three different power modes to change how it draws power: Suggested, Better Performance, and Best Performance. When the Surface Pro 6 is not being charged, it adds another power mode in: Battery Saver, Recommended, Better Performance, Best Performance. The battery life on the Surface Pro 6 comes in at 9 hours.

=== Software ===
All consumer configurations of the Surface Pro 6 are pre-installed with Windows 10 Home 64-bit. Business configurations are pre-installed with Windows 10 Pro. Both include 30-day trials of Microsoft Office 365. The Surface Pro 6 meets the requirements to upgrade to Windows 11.

=== Accessories ===
- An optional Type Cover covered with Alcantara material available in four different colors.
- An optional Surface pen with tilt support and up to 4,096 levels of pressure sensitivity and is available in four different colors.
- There are two styles of Surface Mouse available in three colors. They are the Surface Mobile Mouse and the Surface Arc Mouse.
- The Surface Pro 6 is compatible with the Surface dial for additional shortcuts and functionality.
- An optional Surface Connect to USB-C Adapter (HVU-00003) which attaches to the docking/AC adapter "Surface Connect" port. The adapter supports USB 3, Display Port alternate mode, and charging via USB Power Delivery. Microsoft has discontinued this product.
- optional Surface docks: Surface Dock 1661, Surface Dock 2

== Reception ==
The Surface Pro 6 received generally favourable reviews, with many reviewers praising its high performance and long battery life; however, it was criticised for lacking USB-C ports.

== Timeline ==
Timeline of Surface devices
Sources: Microsoft Devices Blog Microsoft Surface Store Microsoft Surface for Business store

Preceded by Surface Pro (2017)	Surface Pro; 6th generation With: Surface Laptop 2	Succeeded by Surface Pro 7
