= Surface Pro 4 =

Tablet computer by Microsoft

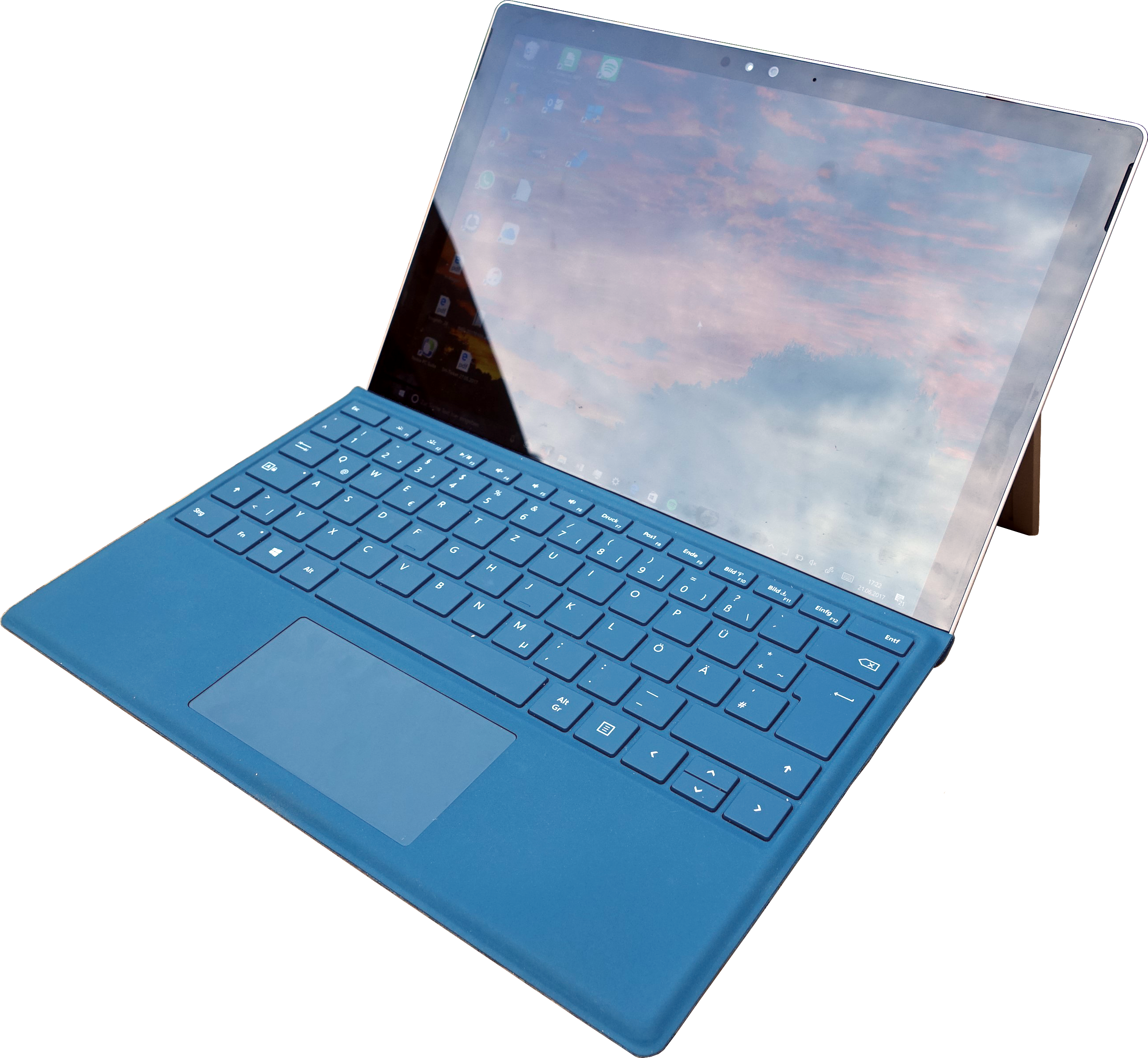
- Surface Pro 4 with bright blue Type Cover
- Developer: Microsoft
- Product family: Surface
- Type: 2-in-1 detachable
- Generation: 4th
- Released: October 26, 2015
- Introductory price: $899 (£749)
- Operating system: Windows 10 Pro
- CPU: Intel Core m3-6Y30; Intel Core i5-6300U; Intel Core i7-6650U
- Memory: 4 GB, 8 GB, or 16 GB
- Storage: PCI-Express SSD: 128 GB, 256 GB, 512 GB, or 1 TB
- Display: 12.3 inches 2736x1824 (267 ppi) PixelSense display with 3:2 aspect ratio
- Graphics: m3: Intel HD graphics 515 i5: Intel HD graphics 520 i7: Intel Iris 540 graphics
- Dimensions: 292.1 mm × 201.42 mm × 8.45 mm (11.500 in × 7.930 in × 0.333 in)
- Weight: m3: 766 g (1.689 lb) i5: 786 g (1.733 lb) i7: 786 g (1.733 lb)
- Predecessor: Surface Pro 3
- Successor: Surface Pro (5th generation)
- Website: www.surface.com

The Surface Pro 4 is the fourth-generation Surface-series 2-in-1 detachable, designed, developed, and marketed by Microsoft. The Surface Pro 4 was announced on October 6, 2015, alongside the Surface Book. In the U.S. and Canada, the Surface Pro 4 was released on October 26, 2015.

The Surface Pro 4 is an update over its predecessor, featuring Skylake CPUs, more RAM and SSD options, and a 12.3-inch display with a greater resolution. At the same time, the device is compatible with most of its predecessor's accessories.

The device's successor, the 2017 Surface Pro, was announced in May 2017, ahead of a release the following month.

The Surface Laptop 4 is a separate line of Surface devices from Microsoft, released in April 2021.

== History ==
The Surface Pro 4 was announced on October 6, 2015 alongside the Surface Book. Both devices were available for pre-order the following day and available for customers beginning on October 26, 2015.

The device initially exhibited failure to sleep properly, which drained the battery very quickly. Microsoft subsequently developed a fix that was made available on February 17, 2016.

== Features ==
=== Hardware ===
The Surface Pro 4 is the same size as the Surface Pro 3, but has a thinner screen bezel which allows for a display of a slightly greater size of 12.3 inches (31 cm). The screen resolution is also greater than the Surface Pro 3's, at 2736×1824 at 267 PPI, with the same aspect ratio of 3:2 and 10-point multi-touch. The chassis is 0.03 inches (0.76 mm) thinner and 0.03 pounds (14 g) lighter than the Surface Pro 3.

The cooling system of the 2-in-1 has been redesigned and dubbed hybrid liquid cooling system. It includes heat pipes with a flowing liquid, which is meant to avoid the use of the internal fan when the device is used for less demanding tasks such as web browsing.

All Surface Pro 4 models feature 6th-generation Skylake Intel Core processors—m3, i5 or i7—which are more powerful and run cooler over its Intel Core Haswell predecessors found in the Surface Pro 3 and 2. The maximum clock rate of the most powerful CPU option (i7-6650U) is also greater at 2.2 GHz, with up to 3.4 GHz in the Turbo Boost mode. The m3-powered model is completely fanless.

RAM options available are 4GB, 8GB, and 16GB, while SSD options are 128GB, 256GB, 512GB, and 1TB; the top options are twice as capacious compared to top options of the Surface Pro 4's two recent predecessors.

The common traits, inherited from the previous-generation Surface Pro 3, are a continuous kickstand, magnesium casing with a silver-colored back side, 802.11a/b/g/n/ac Wi-Fi radio, Bluetooth 4.0 Low Energy, full-size USB 3.0 port, microSD card reader, headset jack, Mini DisplayPort, Cover Port, and a renamed SurfaceConnect, a port on the side to connect a wall charger, Docking Station or Surface Dock accessories.

Surface Pro 4 Configuration Options
| Price Tier (USD) | CPU | Integrated GPU | RAM | Internal Storage |
|---|---|---|---|---|
| $899 | Intel Core m3-6Y30 (0.9 to 2.2 GHz) | HD 515 | 4 GB | 128 GB |
| $999 | Intel Core i5-6300U (2.4 to 3.0 GHz) | HD 520 | 4 GB | 128 GB |
| $1,299 | Intel Core i5-6300U (2.4 to 3.0 GHz) | HD 520 | 8 GB | 256 GB |
| $1,499 | Intel Core i5-6300U (2.4 to 3.0 GHz) | HD 520 | 16 GB | 256 GB |
| $1,699 | Intel Core i5-6300U (2.4 to 3.0 GHz) | HD 520 | 8 GB | 512 GB |
| $1,899 | Intel Core i5-6300U (2.4 to 3.0 GHz) | HD 520 | 16 GB | 512 GB |
| $1,599 | Intel Core i7-6650U (2.2 to 3.4 GHz) | Iris 540 | 8 GB | 256 GB |
| $1,799 | Intel Core i7-6650U (2.2 to 3.4 GHz) | Iris 540 | 16 GB | 256 GB |
| $2,199 | Intel Core i7-6650U (2.2 to 3.4 GHz) | Iris 540 | 16 GB | 512 GB |
| $2,699 | Intel Core i7-6650U (2.2 to 3.4 GHz) | Iris 540 | 16 GB | 1 TB |

=== Software ===
All Surface Pro 4 models come with a 64-bit version of Windows 10 Pro and a Microsoft Office 30-day trial. Windows 10 comes pre-installed with Mail, Calendar, People, Xbox (app), Photos, Movies and TV, Groove, and Microsoft Edge. With Windows 10, a "Tablet mode" is available when the Type Cover is detached from the device. In this mode, all windows are opened full-screen and the interface becomes more touch-centric.

The device also has a camera compatible with Windows Hello. It combines the use of a regular and infrared cameras to authenticate the user.

==== Support and upgrades to Windows 11 ====
Upgrades to Windows 11 require at least an 8th-generation Intel CPU among other requirements. The Surface Pro 4's CPU falls short of Microsoft's minimum requirements, and thus cannot be officially upgraded to Windows 11.

=== Accessories ===
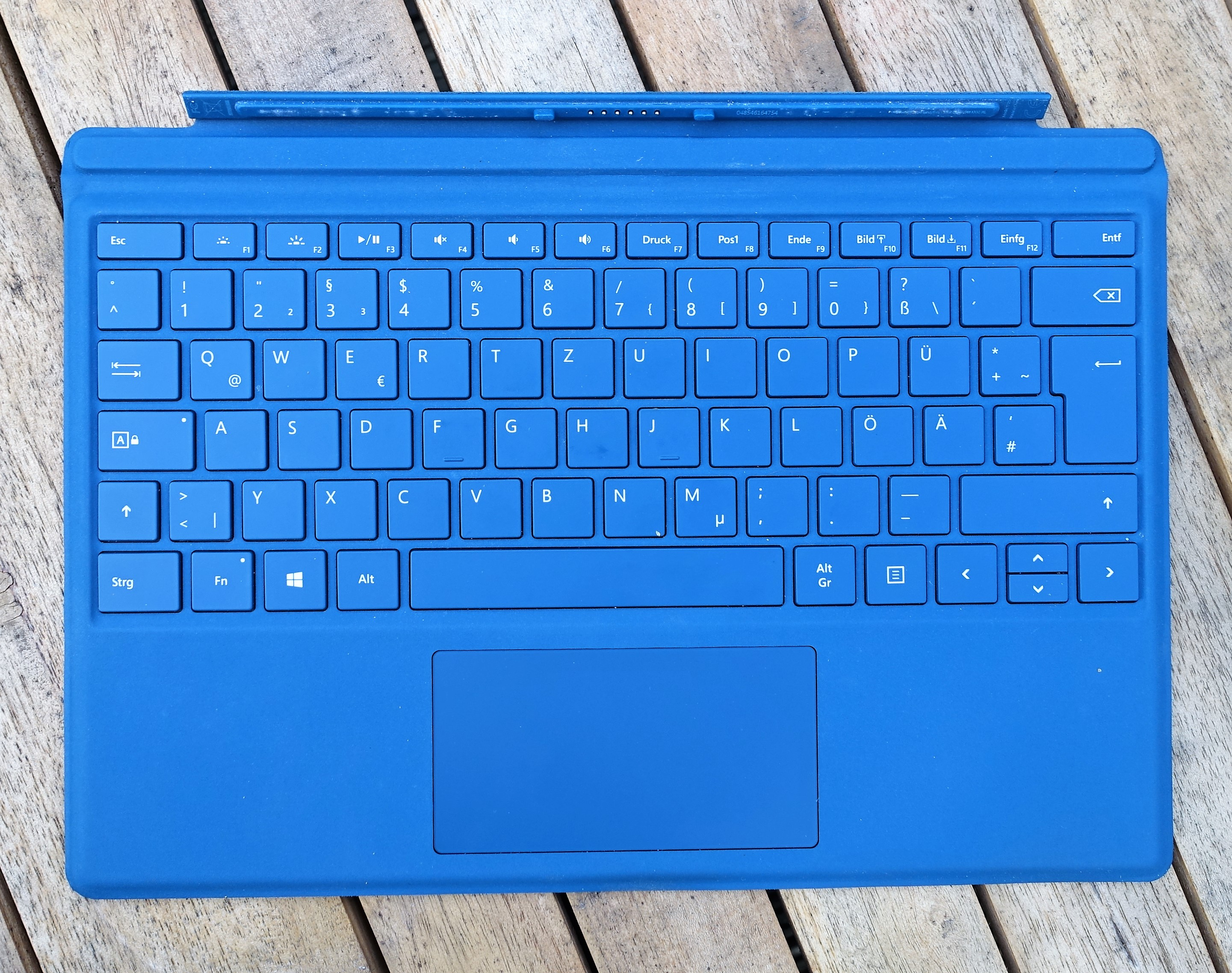
Surface Pro 4 Type Cover in the bright blue version

The Surface Pro 4 is backward-compatible with all of its predecessor's accessories. At the Windows 10 Devices Event on October 6, 2015, alongside new Surface 2-in-1s, new accessories were announced.

The Surface Dock is a redesigned docking accessory in a brick form factor. It is compatible with all past and future Surface models with a SurfaceConnect side port, previously used to connect a wall charger or Docking Station accessory: Surface Pro 3, 4 and Surface Book. The Surface Dock will have 2 Mini DisplayPorts, 1 Gigabit Ethernet, 4 USB 3.0, and 1 audio out ports.

Although the Surface Pro 4 is backward compatible with the predecessor's Type Cover accessory, an attachable keyboard which doubles as a screen protector, the Surface Pro 4 Type Cover has been announced with and without a fingerprint ID sensor. The new Type Cover is thinner and lighter than its predecessor, has improved magnetic stability for lap use, a mechanical keyboard with improved key spacing, as well as a larger touchpad.

An updated version of Surface Pen is included with the Surface Pro 4, which has 1024 levels of pressure sensitivity and is heavier with a rubberized tip. However, the new pen has only one button on the side rather than the previous pen's two. There is an eraser on the end that doubles as a button, which may perform different tasks, like opening the OneNote app or activating Cortana, and can be customized using the Surface App.

== Issues ==
The Surface Pro 4 is known to have wide spread flicker issues with the display named as Flickergate after the independent website flickergate.com which was set up by the affected users after getting no fix from Microsoft.

Microsoft's spokesperson acknowledged the issue stating: "We are aware that some customers have experienced a screen flicker on Surface Pro 4 and are monitoring the situation closely. Customers impacted by this should contact Microsoft support."

Microsoft has stated that defective batteries, pens, and Type Covers may be repaired under warranty.

The Type Cover also has connectivity issues that afflict many, often due to a Windows update. This seems to be a common issue across the Surface series, with a sudden death to the Type Cover.

== Reception ==
The Surface Pro 4 received generally positive reviews from technology critics. Most praise a sharper and larger display compared to the one found in the predecessor, redesigned cooling system, improved technical specifications, and an improved Type Cover. The common disadvantages found by reviewers were that the Type Cover is still a separate purchase, the relatively modest performance of the Intel Core m3 chip, and modest battery life.

== Timeline ==
Timeline of Surface devices
Sources: Microsoft Devices Blog Microsoft Surface Store Microsoft Surface for Business store

| Preceded by Surface Pro 3 | Surface Pro; 4th generation | Succeeded by Surface Pro (2017) |
