= PC Perspective =

- Website type: Technology website
- Available in: English
- Owner: PC Perspective Publications LLC
- Website: pcper.com
- Commercial: Yes
- Registration: Optional
- Launched: 2004
- Current status: Active

PC Perspective (often shortened to PCPer) is a web site dedicated to news and reviews of personal computing and gaming hardware. PC Perspective specializes in hardware that is most relevant to home users and enthusiasts. The site also has an active online community, a weekly podcast, and founder Ryan Shrout was the co-host of TWiT.tv's This Week in Computer Hardware.

== History ==
PCPer was founded by Ryan Shrout in 2004. Shrout previously ran the AMD motherboard centric Amdmb.com, Athlonmb.com, and K7M.com websites.

PC Perspective was originally located at pcperspective.com, but quickly moved to pcper.com.

== Content ==
The PCPer website publishes news and reviews of consumer computing and gaming hardware, which has been highlighted in Forbes, PC World, Ars Technica, and Anandtech. At the editor's discretion, products with exceptional reviews may be given Silver, Gold, or Editor's Choice awards. PCPer has also been noted for purchasing professional level products in order to infer the performance of consumer products based on the same microarchitecture, and livestreaming benchmarking of new products.

The PCPer website also hosts a leaderboard of suggested components for computers at various price points.

PCPer also partnered with Polygon in 2016 on the construction and evaluation of computers for virtual reality gaming.

Due to consulting done by some PCPer staff on products, some PCPer reviews include disclosure statements describing the consulting and review relationship and any potential conflict of interest. With the departure of PCPer staff involved in private consulting and the transfer of ownership on January 1, 2019 to individuals not involved in any form of private consulting, the PCPer review disclosures statements have remained under the justification of providing readers with relevant information about published reviews.

=== Podcasts ===
PCPer hosts a weekly podcast discussing the weeks technology news and reviews. Video podcasts have been produced since at least 2010, with a successful Indiegogo fundraising campaign supporting production equipment. PCPer also began in July 2017 to host a weekly video series answering reader's questions, after reaching a set support level on Patreon.

Ryan Shrout was the regular co-host of TWiT.tv's This Week in Computer Hardware with Patrick Norton with other PCPer editors co-hosting as-well. Sebastian Peak took over co-hosting duties when Shrout went on to work for Intel.

== Ryan Shrout ==
Founder Ryan Shrout is also a consultant, analyst for MarketWatch and contributor to EE Times, and CNBC, and other publications; often discussing technology related news. Shrout has also co-hosted The Tech Analysts podcast, discussing technology topics, with Patrick Moorehead since 2017.

In October 2018, Shrout announced he would leave PCPer and join Intel as the company's Chief Performance Strategist, later leaving Intel in 2023 to lead the technical marketing company Signal65.
