= Consumer Ultra-Low Voltage =

Computing platform by Intel

Consumer Ultra-Low Voltage (CULV) is a computing platform developed by Intel. It was estimated in January 2009 that this market could reach 10 million CULV laptops shipped during that year. Competing platforms are the VIA Nano, AMD Yukon, AMD Nile notebook platform, and graphic chips from the Nvidia GeForce line within the "Nvidia Ion platform". Some of the lowest-power-consumption processors for the ultra thin CULV category are only a few watts more than the Intel Atom, which is rated at no more than 2.5 W. Because of their low power and heat output, CULV enables very thin computer systems, and long battery life in notebook computers, such as those designed to Intel's Ultrabook specifications.

While the first processors in this category were single core (such as the SU3500), newer CULV processors are dual core (e.g., the SU9600). They are all based on the Intel Core 2 architecture, but the ultra-low voltage versions have a thermal rating of 5.5 W – more than the Intel Atom, but a fraction of the dual-core mainstream Intel mobile chips rated at 25 and 35 watts – and they come in a small 22 mm chip package.

The newest CULV processors come from the Intel Core product lines, and are based on a Intel 3 process.

== Processors ==
=== Based on the Penryn microarchitecture ===
==== Single-Core Processors (45 nm) ====
Model	sSpec number	Cores	Clock rate	L2 cache	FSB	Mult.	Voltage	TDP	Socket	Release date	Part number(s)	Release price (USD)
Celeron
Celeron M ULV 722	SLGAT (M0); SLGAN (R0)	1	1.2 GHz	1 MB	800 MT/s	6×	0.775–1.1 V	5.5 W	μFC-BGA 956	September 2008	AV80585VG0091MP	
Celeron M ULV 723	SLGAS (M0); SLGAM (R0)	1	1.2 GHz	1 MB	800 MT/s	6×	1.05–1.15 V	10 W	μFC-BGA 956	September 2008	AV80585VG0091M	$107
Celeron M ULV 743	SLGEV (R0)	1	1.3 GHz	1 MB	800 MT/s	6.5×	1.05–1.15 V	10 W	μFC-BGA 956	September 2009	AV80585VG0131M	$107
Celeron ULV 763	SLGQQ (R0)	1	1.4 GHz	1 MB	800 MT/s	7×	1.05–1.15 V	10 W	μFC-BGA 956	January 2011	AV80585VG0171M	$107
Pentium
Pentium SU2700	SLGS8 (R0)	1	1.3 GHz	2 MB	800 MT/s	6.5×	1.05–1.15 V	10 W	μFC-BGA 956	May 23, 2009	AV80585UG0132M	OEM
Core 2
Core 2 Solo SU3300	SLGAR (M0); SLGAJ (R0)	1	1.2 GHz	3 MB	800 MT/s	6×	1.05–1.15 V	5.5 W	μFC-BGA 956	May 2008	AV80585UG0093M	$262
Core 2 Solo SU3500	SLGFM (R0)	1	1.4 GHz	3 MB	800 MT/s	7×	1.05–1.15 V	5.5 W	μFC-BGA 956	Q2 2009	AV80585UG0173M	$262

==== Dual-Core Processors (45 nm) ====
Model	sSpec number	Cores	Clock rate	L2 cache	FSB	Mult.	Voltage	TDP	Socket	Release date	Part number(s)	Release price (USD)
Celeron
Celeron SU2300	SLGSB (R0); SLGYW (R0)	2	1.2 GHz	1 MB	800 MT/s	6×	1.05–1.15 V	10 W	μFC-BGA 956	September 2009	AV80577UG0091M; AV80577UG0091ML	$134
Pentium
Pentium SU4100	SLGS4 (R0)	2	1.3 GHz	2 MB	800 MT/s	6.5×	1.05–1.15 V	10 W	μFC-BGA 956	September 2009	AV80577UG0132M	OEM
Core 2
Core 2 Duo SU7300	SLGS6 (R0); SLGYV (R0)	2	1.3 GHz	3 MB	800 MT/s	6.5×	1.05–1.15 V	10 W	μFC-BGA 956	September 2009	AV80577UG0133M; AV80577UG0133ML	$289
Core 2 Duo SU9300	SLB5Q (M0); SLGAL (R0)	2	1.2 GHz	3 MB	800 MT/s	6×	1.05–1.15 V	10 W	μFC-BGA 956	September 2008	AV80577UG0093M	$262
Core 2 Duo SU9400	SLB5V (M0); SLGHN (M0); SLGAK (R0)	2	1.4 GHz	3 MB	800 MT/s	7×	1.05–1.15 V	10 W	μFC-BGA 956	September 2008	AV80577UG0173M	$289
Core 2 Duo SU9600	SLGEX (R0); SLGFN (R0)	2	1.6 GHz	3 MB	800 MT/s	8×	1.05–1.15 V	10 W	μFC-BGA 956	Q1 2009	AV80577UG0253M	$289

=== Based on the Westmere microarchitecture ===
==== Celeron (32 nm) ====
Model	sSpec number	Clock rate	Turbo	GPU frequency	Cores	L2 cache	L3 cache	I/O bus	Mult.	Memory	Voltage	TDP	Socket	Release date	Part number(s)	Release price (USD)
Celeron U3400	SLBUE (K0)	1.07 GHz	—N/a	166-500 MHz	2	2 × 256 KB	2 MB	DMI	8×	2 × DDR3-800	0.725–1.4 V	18 W	BGA-1288	May 25, 2010	CN80617006039AA	$134
Celeron U3405	SLBWX (K0)	1.07 GHz	—N/a	166-500 MHz	2	2 × 256 KB	2 MB	DMI	8×	2 × DDR3-800/1066	0.725–1.4 V	18 W	BGA-1288	September 26, 2010	CN80617006201AA	OEM
Celeron U3600	SLBZT (K0)	1.2 GHz	—N/a	166–500 MHz	2	2 × 256 KB	2 MB	DMI	9×	2 × DDR3-800	0.725–1.4 V	18 W	BGA-1288	January 9, 2011	CN80617006930AA	$134

==== Pentium (32 nm) ====
Model	sSpec number	Clock rate	Turbo	GPU frequency	Cores	L2 cache	L3 cache	I/O bus	Mult.	Memory	Voltage	TDP	Socket	Release date	Part number(s)	Release price (USD)
Pentium U5400	SLBUH (K0)	1.2 GHz	—N/a	166-500 MHz	2	2 × 256 KB	3 MB	DMI	9×	2 × DDR3-800	0.725–1.4 V	18 W	BGA-1288	May 25, 2010	CN80617006042AC	N/A
Pentium U5600	SLBSM (K0)	1.33 GHz	—N/a	166–500 MHz	2	2 × 256 KB	3 MB	DMI	10×	2 × DDR3-800	0.725–1.4 V	18 W	BGA-1288	January 9, 2011	CN80617005190AG	

==== Core i3 (32 nm) ====
Model	sSpec number	Clock rate	Turbo	GPU frequency	Cores	L2 cache	L3 cache	I/O bus	Mult.	Memory	Voltage	TDP	Socket	Release date	Part number(s)	Release price (USD)
Core i3-330UM	SLBUG (K0)	1.2 GHz	—N/a	166-500 MHz	2	2 × 256 KB	3 MB	DMI	9×	2 × DDR3-800	0.725–1.4 V	18 W	BGA-1288	May 25, 2010	CN80617006042AB	N/A
Core i3-380UM	SLBSL (K0)	1.33 GHz	—N/a	166–500 MHz	2	2 × 256 KB	3 MB	DMI	10×	2 × DDR3-800	0.725–1.4 V	18 W	BGA-1288	October 1, 2010	CN80617005190AF	OEM

==== Core i5 (32 nm) ====
Model	sSpec number	Clock rate	Turbo	GPU frequency	Cores	L2 cache	L3 cache	I/O bus	Mult.	Memory	Voltage	TDP	Socket	Release date	Part number(s)	Release price (USD)
Core i5-430UM	SLBVS (K0)	1.2 GHz	2/4	166-500 MHz	2	2 × 256 KB	3 MB	DMI	9×	2 × DDR3-800	0.725–1.4 V	18 W	BGA-1288	May 25, 2010	CN80617006042AE	OEM
Core i5-470UM	SLBXP (K0)	1.33 GHz	2/4	166-500 MHz	2	2 × 256 KB	3 MB	DMI	10×	2 × DDR3-800	0.725–1.4 V	18 W	BGA-1288	October 1, 2010	CN80617005190AI	OEM
Core i5-520UM	SLBQP (C2); SLBSQ (K0)	1.07 GHz	4/6	166-500 MHz	2	2 × 256 KB	3 MB	DMI	8×	2 × DDR3-800	0.725–1.4 V	18 W	BGA-1288	January 7, 2010	CN80617005352AA	$241
Core i5-540UM	SLBUJ (K0)	1.2 GHz	4/6	166-500 MHz	2	2 × 256 KB	3 MB	DMI	9×	2 × DDR3-800	0.725–1.4 V	18 W	BGA-1288	May 25, 2010	CN80617006042AD	$250
Core i5-560UM	SLBSN (K0)	1.33 GHz	4/6	166–500 MHz	2	2 × 256 KB	3 MB	DMI	10×	2 × DDR3-800	0.725–1.4 V	18 W	BGA-1288	September 26, 2010	CN80617005190AH	$250

==== Core i7 (32 nm) ====
Model	sSpec number	Clock rate	Turbo	GPU frequency	Cores	L2 cache	L3 cache	I/O bus	Mult.	Memory	Voltage	TDP	Socket	Release date	Part number(s)	Release price (USD)
Core i7-620UM	SLBMN (C2); SLBSX (K0)	1.07 GHz	5/8	166-500 MHz	2	2 × 256 KB	4 MB	DMI	8×	2 × DDR3-800	0.725–1.4 V	18 W	BGA-1288	January 7, 2010	CN80617003882AE	$278
Core i7-620UE	SLBPA (C2); SLBXJ (K0)	1.07 GHz	5/8	166-500 MHz	2	2 × 256 KB	4 MB	DMI	8×	2 × DDR3-800	0.725–1.4 V	18 W	BGA-1288	January 7, 2010	CN80617004458AB	
Core i7-640UM	SLBMM (C2); SLBSR (K0)	1.2 GHz	5/8	166-500 MHz	2	2 × 256 KB	4 MB	DMI	9×	2 × DDR3-800	0.725–1.4 V	18 W	BGA-1288	January 7, 2010	CN80617003888AD	$305
Core i7-660UM	SLBSS (K0)	1.33 GHz	5/8	166-500 MHz	2	2 × 256 KB	4 MB	DMI	10×	2 × DDR3-800	0.725–1.4 V	18 W	BGA-1288	May 25, 2010	CN80617005187AB	$317
Core i7-680UM	SLBST (K0)	1.47 GHz	5/8	166–500 MHz	2	2 × 256 KB	4 MB	DMI	11×	2 × DDR3-800	0.725–1.4 V	18 W	BGA-1288	September 26, 2010	CN80617004860AA	$317

=== Based on the Sandy Bridge microarchitecture ===
==== Celeron (32 nm) ====
Model	sSpec number	Cores	Clock rate	Turbo	L2 cache	L3 cache	GPU model	GPU frequency	TDP	Socket	I/O bus	Release date	Part number(s)	Release price (USD)
Celeron 787	SR0EC (J1)	1	1.3 GHz	—N/a	1 × 256 KB	1.5 MB	HD Graphics (6 EUs)	350–950 MHz	17 W	BGA-1023	DMI 2.0	July 2011	AV8062701079501	$107
Celeron 797	SR0ED (J1)	1	1.4 GHz	—N/a	1 × 256 KB	1.5 MB	HD Graphics (6 EUs)	350–950 MHz	17 W	BGA-1023	DMI 2.0	January 2012	AV8062701079601	$107
Celeron 807	SR0EE (J1)	1	1.5 GHz	—N/a	1 × 256 KB	1.5 MB	HD Graphics (6 EUs)	350–950 MHz	17 W	BGA-1023	DMI 2.0	July 2012	AV8062701079701	$70
Celeron 847	SR08N (Q0)	2	1.1 GHz	—N/a	2 × 256 KB	2 MB	HD Graphics (6 EUs)	350–800 MHz	17 W	BGA-1023	DMI 2.0	June 2011	AV8062700852800	$134
Celeron 857	SR0EZ (Q0)	2	1.2 GHz	—N/a	2 × 256 KB	2 MB	HD Graphics (6 EUs)	350–1000 MHz	17 W	BGA-1023	DMI 2.0	July 2011	AV8062701022701	$134
Celeron 867	SR0V3 (Q0)	2	1.3 GHz	—N/a	2 × 256 KB	2 MB	HD Graphics (6 EUs)	350–1000 MHz	17 W	BGA-1023	DMI 2.0	January 2012	AV8062701022801	$134
Celeron 877	SR0VB (Q0)	2	1.4 GHz	—N/a	2 × 256 KB	2 MB	HD Graphics (6 EUs)	350–1000 MHz	17 W	BGA-1023	DMI 2.0	July 2012	AV8062701085501	$86
Celeron 887	SR0VA (Q0)	2	1.5 GHz	—N/a	2 × 256 KB	2 MB	HD Graphics (6 EUs)	350–1000 MHz	17 W	BGA-1023	DMI 2.0	September 2012	AV8062701085401	$86

==== Pentium (32 nm) ====
Model	sSpec number	Cores	Clock rate	Turbo	L2 cache	L3 cache	GPU model	GPU frequency	TDP	Socket	I/O bus	Release date	Part number(s)	Release price (USD)
Pentium 957	SR089 (Q0)	2	1.2 GHz	—N/a	2 × 256 KB	2 MB	HD Graphics (6 EUs)	350–800 MHz	17 W	BGA-1023	DMI 2.0	June 19, 2011	AV8062700852600	$134
Pentium 967	SR0FC (J1)	2	1.3 GHz	—N/a	2 × 256 KB	2 MB	HD Graphics (6 EUs)	350–1000 MHz	17 W	BGA-1023	DMI 2.0	October 2, 2011	AV8062701147801	$134
Pentium 977	SR0FB (J1)	2	1.4 GHz	—N/a	2 × 256 KB	2 MB	HD Graphics (6 EUs)	350–1000 MHz	17 W	BGA-1023	DMI 2.0	January 2012	AV8062701147701	$134
Pentium 987	SR0FA (J1)	2	1.5 GHz	—N/a	2 × 256 KB	2 MB	HD Graphics (6 EUs)	350–1000 MHz	17 W	BGA-1023	DMI 2.0	Q3 2012	AV8062701147601	$134
Pentium 997	SR0V5 (Q0)	2	1.6 GHz	—N/a	2 × 256 KB	2 MB	HD Graphics (6 EUs)	350–1000 MHz	17 W	BGA-1023	DMI 2.0	September 2012	AV8062701084801	$134

==== Core i3 (32 nm) ====
Model	sSpec number	Cores	Clock rate	Turbo	L2 cache	L3 cache	GPU model	GPU frequency	TDP	Socket	I/O bus	Release date	Part number(s)	Release price (USD)
Core i3-2357M	SR0BJ (J1)	2	1.3 GHz	—N/a	2 × 256 KB	3 MB	HD Graphics 3000	350–950 MHz	17 W	BGA-1023	DMI 2.0	June 2011	AV8062701047703	$250
Core i3-2365M	SR0U3 (J1)	2	1.4 GHz	—N/a	2 × 256 KB	3 MB	HD Graphics 3000	350–1000 MHz	17 W	BGA-1023	DMI 2.0	September 2012	AV8062701313000	$225
Core i3-2367M	SR0CV (J1)	2	1.4 GHz	—N/a	2 × 256 KB	3 MB	HD Graphics 3000	350–1000 MHz	17 W	BGA-1023	DMI 2.0	October 2011	AV8062701047904	$250
Core i3-2375M	SR0U4 (J1)	2	1.5 GHz	—N/a	2 × 256 KB	3 MB	HD Graphics 3000	350–1000 MHz	17 W	BGA-1023	DMI 2.0	Q1 2013	AV8062701313100	$225
Core i3-2377M	SR0CW (J1)	2	1.5 GHz	—N/a	2 × 256 KB	3 MB	HD Graphics 3000	350–1000 MHz	17 W	BGA-1023	DMI 2.0	September 2012	AV8062701048004	$250

==== Core i5 (32 nm) ====
Model	sSpec number	Cores	Clock rate	Turbo	L2 cache	L3 cache	GPU model	GPU frequency	TDP	Socket	I/O bus	Release date	Part number(s)	Release price (USD)
Core i5-2467M	SR0D6 (J1)	2	1.6 GHz	5/7	2 × 256 KB	3 MB	HD Graphics 3000	350–1150 MHz	17 W	BGA-1023	DMI 2.0	June 19, 2011	AV8062701047504	$250
Core i5-2537M	SR03W (J1)	2	1.4 GHz	6/9	2 × 256 KB	3 MB	HD Graphics 3000	350–900 MHz	17 W	BGA-1023	DMI 2.0	February 20, 2011	AV8062701047107	$250
Core i5-2557M	SR0CS (J1)	2	1.7 GHz	7/10	2 × 256 KB	3 MB	HD Graphics 3000	350–1200 MHz	17 W	BGA-1023	DMI 2.0	June 19, 2011	AV8062701047204	$250

==== Core i7 (32 nm) ====
Model	sSpec number	Cores	Clock rate	Turbo	L2 cache	L3 cache	GPU model	GPU frequency	TDP	Socket	I/O bus	Release date	Part number(s)	Release price (USD)
Core i7-2617M	SR03T (J1)	2	1.5 GHz	8/11	2 × 256 KB	4 MB	HD Graphics 3000	350–950 MHz	17 W	BGA-1023	DMI 2.0	February 20, 2011	AV8062701040904	$289
Core i7-2637M	SR0D3 (J1)	2	1.7 GHz	8/11	2 × 256 KB	4 MB	HD Graphics 3000	350–1200 MHz	17 W	BGA-1023	DMI 2.0	June 19, 2011	AV8062701041105	$289
Core i7-2657M	SR03S (J1)	2	1.6 GHz	8/11	2 × 256 KB	4 MB	HD Graphics 3000	350–1000 MHz	17 W	BGA-1023	DMI 2.0	February 20, 2011	AV8062701040804	$317
Core i7-2677M	SR0D2 (J1)	2	1.8 GHz	8/11	2 × 256 KB	4 MB	HD Graphics 3000	350–1200 MHz	17 W	BGA-1023	DMI 2.0	June 19, 2011	AV8062701041005	$317

=== Based on the Ivy Bridge microarchitecture ===
==== Celeron (22 nm) ====
Model	sSpec number	Cores	Clock rate	Turbo	L2 cache	L3 cache	GPU model	GPU frequency	TDP	Socket	I/O bus	Release date	Part number(s)	Release price (USD)
Celeron 1007U	SR109 (P0)	2	1.5 GHz	—N/a	2 × 256 KB	2 MB	HD Graphics (6 EUs)	350–1000 MHz	17 W	BGA-1023	DMI 2.0	January 2013	AV8063801118700	$86
Celeron 1017U	SR10A (P0)	2	1.6 GHz	—N/a	2 × 256 KB	2 MB	HD Graphics (6 EUs)	350–1000 MHz	17 W	BGA-1023	DMI 2.0	June 2013	AV8063801130300	$86
Celeron 1037U	SR108 (P0)	2	1.8 GHz	—N/a	2 × 256 KB	2 MB	HD Graphics (6 EUs)	350–1000 MHz	17 W	BGA-1023	DMI 2.0	January 2013	AV8063801442900	$86
Celeron 1019Y	SR13W (P0)	2	1 GHz	—N/a	2 × 256 KB	2 MB	HD Graphics (6 EUs)	350–800 MHz	10 W	BGA-1023	DMI 2.0	April 2013	AV8063801443502	$153

==== Pentium (22 nm) ====
Model	sSpec number	Cores	Clock rate	Turbo	L2 cache	L3 cache	GPU model	GPU frequency	TDP	Socket	I/O bus	Release date	Part number(s)	Release price (USD)
Pentium 2117U	SR0VQ (P0)	2	1.8 GHz	—N/a	2 × 256 KB	2 MB	HD Graphics (6 EUs)	350-1000 MHz	17 W	BGA-1023	DMI 2.0	September 2012	AV8063801058800	$134
Pentium 2127U	SR105 (P0)	2	1.9 GHz	—N/a	2 × 256 KB	2 MB	HD Graphics (6 EUs)	350-1000 MHz	17 W	BGA-1023	DMI 2.0	June 2013	AV8063801119100	$134
Pentium 2129Y	SR12M (P0)	2	1.1 GHz	—N/a	2 × 256 KB	2 MB	HD Graphics (6 EUs)	350-850 MHz	10 W	BGA-1023	DMI 2.0	January 2013	AV8063801377901	$150

==== Core i3 (22 nm) ====
Model	sSpec number	Cores	Clock rate	Turbo	L2 cache	L3 cache	GPU model	GPU frequency	TDP	Socket	I/O bus	Release date	Part number(s)	Release price (USD)
Core i3-3217U	SR0N9 (L1)	2	1.8 GHz	—N/a	2 × 256 KB	3 MB	HD Graphics 4000	350–1050 MHz	17 W	BGA-1023	DMI 2.0	June 2012	AV8063801058401	$225
Core i3-3227U	SR0XF (L1)	2	1.9 GHz	—N/a	2 × 256 KB	3 MB	HD Graphics 4000	350–1100 MHz	17 W	BGA-1023	DMI 2.0	January 2013	AV8063801119500	$225
Core i3-3229Y	SR12P (L1)	2	1.4 GHz	—N/a	2 × 256 KB	3 MB	HD Graphics 4000	350–850 MHz	13 W	BGA-1023	DMI 2.0	January 2013	AV8063801378000	$250

==== Core i5 (22 nm) ====
Model	sSpec number	Cores	Clock rate	Turbo	L2 cache	L3 cache	GPU model	GPU frequency	TDP	Socket	I/O bus	Release date	Part number(s)	Release price (USD)
Core i5-3317U	SR0N8 (L1)	2	1.7 GHz	7/9	2 × 256 KB	3 MB	HD Graphics 4000	350–1050 MHz	17 W	BGA-1023	DMI 2.0	June 2012	AV8063801058002	$225
Core i5-3337U	SR0XL (L1)	2	1.8 GHz	7/9	2 × 256 KB	3 MB	HD Graphics 4000	350–1100 MHz	17 W	BGA-1023	DMI 2.0	January 2013	AV8063801129900	$225
Core i5-3427U	SR0N7 (L1)	2	1.8 GHz	8/10	2 × 256 KB	3 MB	HD Graphics 4000	350–1150 MHz	17 W	BGA-1023	DMI 2.0	June 2012	AV8063801057801	$225
Core i5-3437U	SR0XE (L1)	2	1.9 GHz	8/10	2 × 256 KB	3 MB	HD Graphics 4000	650–1200 MHz	17 W	BGA-1023	DMI 2.0	January 2013	AV8063801119300	$225
Core i5-3339Y	SR12S (L1)	2	1.5 GHz	3/5	2 × 256 KB	3 MB	HD Graphics 4000	350–850 MHz	13 W	BGA-1023	DMI 2.0	January 2013	AV8063801433100	$250
Core i5-3439Y	SR12Q (L1)	2	1.5 GHz	6/8	2 × 256 KB	3 MB	HD Graphics 4000	350–850 MHz	13 W	BGA-1023	DMI 2.0	January 2013	AV8063801378103	$250

==== Core i7 (22 nm) ====
Model	sSpec number	Cores	Clock rate	Turbo	L2 cache	L3 cache	GPU model	GPU frequency	TDP	Socket	I/O bus	Release date	Part number(s)	Release price (USD)
Core i7-3517U	SR0N6 (L1)	2	1.9 GHz	9/11	2 × 256 KB	4 MB	HD Graphics 4000	350–1150 MHz	17 W	BGA-1023	DMI 2.0	June 2012	AV8063801057605	$346
Core i7-3537U	SR0XG (L1)	2	2 GHz	9/11	2 × 256 KB	4 MB	HD Graphics 4000	350–1200 MHz	17 W	BGA-1023	DMI 2.0	January 2013	AV8063801119700	$346
Core i7-3667U	SR0N5 (L1)	2	2 GHz	10/12	2 × 256 KB	4 MB	HD Graphics 4000	350–1150 MHz	17 W	BGA-1023	DMI 2.0	June 2012	AV8063801057405	$346
Core i7-3687U	SR0XH (L1)	2	2.1 GHz	10/12	2 × 256 KB	4 MB	HD Graphics 4000	650–1200 MHz	17 W	BGA-1023	DMI 2.0	January 2013	AV8063801119903	$356
Core i7-3689Y	SR12R (L1)	2	1.5 GHz	9/11	2 × 256 KB	4 MB	HD Graphics 4000	350–850 MHz	13 W	BGA-1023	DMI 2.0	January 2013	AV8063801378203	$362

=== Based on the Haswell microarchitecture ===
==== Celeron (22 nm) ====
Model	sSpec number	Cores	Clock rate	Turbo	L2 cache	L3 cache	GPU model	GPU frequency	TDP	Socket	I/O bus	Release date	Part number(s)	Release price (USD)
Celeron 2955U	SR16Y (C0); SR1DU (D0)	2	1.4 GHz	—N/a	2 × 256 KB	2 MB	HD Graphics (10 EUs)	200–1000 MHz	15 W	BGA-1168	DMI 2.0	September 2013	CL8064701523900; CL8064701567500	$132
Celeron 2957U	SR1DV (D0)	2	1.4 GHz	—N/a	2 × 256 KB	2 MB	HD Graphics (10 EUs)	200–1000 MHz	15 W	BGA-1168	DMI 2.0	December 2013	CL8064701570000	$132
Celeron 2980U	SR1DM (D0)	2	1.6 GHz	—N/a	2 × 256 KB	2 MB	HD Graphics (10 EUs)	200–1000 MHz	15 W	BGA-1168	DMI 2.0	September 2013	CL8064701479801	$137
Celeron 2981U	SR1DX (D0)	2	1.6 GHz	—N/a	2 × 256 KB	2 MB	HD Graphics (10 EUs)	200–1000 MHz	15 W	BGA-1168	DMI 2.0	December 2013	CL8064701570200	$132
Celeron 2961Y	SR1DK (D0)	2	1.1 GHz	—N/a	2 × 256 KB	2 MB	HD Graphics (10 EUs)	200–850 MHz	11.5 W	BGA-1168	DMI 2.0	December 2013	CL8064701568400	

==== Pentium (22 nm) ====
Model	sSpec number	Cores	Clock rate	Turbo	L2 cache	L3 cache	GPU model	GPU frequency	TDP	Socket	I/O bus	Release date	Part number(s)	Release price (USD)
Pentium 3556U	SR1E3 (D0)	2	1.7 GHz	—N/a	2 × 256 KB	2 MB	HD Graphics (10 EUs)	200–1000 MHz	15 W	BGA-1168	DMI 2.0	September 2013	CL8064701558100	
Pentium 3558U	SR1E8 (D0)	2	1.7 GHz	—N/a	2 × 256 KB	2 MB	HD Graphics (10 EUs)	200–1000 MHz	15 W	BGA-1168	DMI 2.0	December 2013	CL8064701569500	$161
Pentium 3560Y	SR1DE (D0)	2	1.2 GHz	—N/a	2 × 256 KB	2 MB	HD Graphics (10 EUs)	200–850 MHz	11.5 W	BGA-1168	DMI 2.0	September 2013	CL8064701486008	
Pentium 3561Y	SR1DG (D0)	2	1.2 GHz	—N/a	2 × 256 KB	2 MB	HD Graphics (10 EUs)	200–850 MHz	11.5 W	BGA-1168	DMI 2.0	December 2013	CL8064701568201	$161

==== Core i3 (22 nm) ====
Model	sSpec number	Cores	Clock rate	Turbo	L2 cache	L3 cache	GPU model	GPU frequency	TDP	Socket	I/O bus	Release date	Part number(s)	Release price (USD)
Core i3-4005U	SR1EK (D0)	2	1.7 GHz	—N/a	2 × 256 KB	3 MB	HD Graphics 4400	200–950 MHz	15 W	BGA-1168	DMI 2.0	September 2013	CL8064701478404	$281
Core i3-4010U	SR16Q (C0)	2	1.7 GHz	—N/a	2 × 256 KB	3 MB	HD Graphics 4400	200–1000 MHz	15 W	BGA-1168	DMI 2.0	June 2013	CL8064701478202	$287
Core i3-4025U	SR1EQ (D0)	2	1.9 GHz	—N/a	2 × 256 KB	3 MB	HD Graphics 4400	200–950 MHz	15 W	BGA-1168	DMI 2.0	April 2014	CL8064701553401	$275
Core i3-4030U	SR1EN (D0)	2	1.9 GHz	—N/a	2 × 256 KB	3 MB	HD Graphics 4400	200–1000 MHz	15 W	BGA-1168	DMI 2.0	April 2014	CL8064701552900	$281
Core i3-4100U	SR16P (C0)	2	1.8 GHz	—N/a	2 × 256 KB	3 MB	HD Graphics 4400	200–1000 MHz	15 W	BGA-1168	DMI 2.0	June 2013	CL8064701476302	$287
Core i3-4120U	SR1EP (D0)	2	2 GHz	—N/a	2 × 256 KB	3 MB	HD Graphics 4400	200–1000 MHz	15 W	BGA-1168	DMI 2.0	April 2014	CL8064701553300	$281
Core i3-4010Y	SR18F (C0)	2	1.3 GHz	—N/a	2 × 256 KB	3 MB	HD Graphics 4200	200–850 MHz	11.5 W	BGA-1168	DMI 2.0	June 2013	CL8064701512503	$304
Core i3-4012Y	SR1C7 (D0)	2	1.5 GHz	—N/a	2 × 256 KB	3 MB	HD Graphics 4200	200–850 MHz	11.5 W	BGA-1168	DMI 2.0	September 2013	CL8064701573500	$304
Core i3-4020Y	SR1DC (D0)	2	1.5 GHz	—N/a	2 × 256 KB	3 MB	HD Graphics 4200	200–850 MHz	11.5 W	BGA-1168	DMI 2.0	September 2013	CL8064701512402	$304
Core i3-4030Y	SR1DD (D0)	2	1.6 GHz	—N/a	2 × 256 KB	3 MB	HD Graphics 4200	200–850 MHz	11.5 W	BGA-1168	DMI 2.0	April 2014	CL8064701570500	$281

==== Core i5 (22 nm) ====
Model	sSpec number	Cores	Clock rate	Turbo	L2 cache	L3 cache	GPU model	GPU frequency	TDP	Socket	I/O bus	Release date	Part number(s)	Release price (USD)
Core i5-4200U	SR170 (C0)	2	1.6 GHz	7/10	2 × 256 KB	3 MB	HD Graphics 4400	200–1000 MHz	15 W	BGA-1168	DMI 2.0	June 2013	CL8064701477702	$287
Core i5-4210U	SR1EF (D0)	2	1.7 GHz	7/10	2 × 256 KB	3 MB	HD Graphics 4400	200–1000 MHz	15 W	BGA-1168	DMI 2.0	April 2014	CL8064701477802	$281
Core i5-4250U	SR16M (C0)	2	1.3 GHz	10/13	2 × 256 KB	3 MB	HD Graphics 5000	200–1000 MHz	15 W	BGA-1168	DMI 2.0	June 2013	CL8064701463101	$342
Core i5-4260U	SR16T (C0)	2	1.4 GHz	10/13	2 × 256 KB	3 MB	HD Graphics 5000	200–1000 MHz	15 W	BGA-1168	DMI 2.0	April 2014	CL8064701476801	$315
Core i5-4300U	SR1ED (D0)	2	1.9 GHz	7/10	2 × 256 KB	3 MB	HD Graphics 4400	200–1100 MHz	15 W	BGA-1168	DMI 2.0	September 2013	CL8064701477400	$287
Core i5-4310U	SR1EE (D0)	2	2 GHz	7/10	2 × 256 KB	3 MB	HD Graphics 4400	200–1100 MHz	15 W	BGA-1168	DMI 2.0	February 2014	CL8064701477600	$281
Core i5-4350U	SR16L (C0)	2	1.4 GHz	12/15	2 × 256 KB	3 MB	HD Graphics 5000	200–1100 MHz	15 W	BGA-1168	DMI 2.0	June 2013	CL8064701463001	$342
Core i5-4360U	SR16S (C0)	2	1.5 GHz	12/15	2 × 256 KB	3 MB	HD Graphics 5000	200–1100 MHz	15 W	BGA-1168	DMI 2.0	February 2014	CL8064701476701	$315
Core i5-4200Y	SR18T (C0)	2	1.4 GHz	2/5	2 × 256 KB	3 MB	HD Graphics 4200	200–850 MHz	11.5 W	BGA-1168	DMI 2.0	June 2013	CL8064701557900	$304
Core i5-4202Y	SR190 (D0)	2	1.6 GHz	2/4	2 × 256 KB	3 MB	HD Graphics 4200	200–850 MHz	11.5 W	BGA-1168	DMI 2.0	September 2013	CL8064701558401	
Core i5-4210Y	SR191 (D0)	2	1.5 GHz	2/4	2 × 256 KB	3 MB	HD Graphics 4200	200–850 MHz	11.5 W	BGA-1168	DMI 2.0	September 2013	CL8064701558501	$304
Core i5-4220Y	SR1DB (D0)	2	1.6 GHz	2/4	2 × 256 KB	3 MB	HD Graphics 4200	200–850 MHz	11.5 W	BGA-1168	DMI 2.0	April 2014	CL8064701570400	$281
Core i5-4300Y	SR192 (D0)	2	1.6 GHz	4/7	2 × 256 KB	3 MB	HD Graphics 4200	200–850 MHz	11.5 W	BGA-1168	DMI 2.0	September 2013	CL8064701558601	$304
Core i5-4302Y	SR19B (D0)	2	1.6 GHz	4/7	2 × 256 KB	3 MB	HD Graphics 4200	200–850 MHz	11.5 W	BGA-1168	DMI 2.0	September 2013	CL8064701564001	

==== Core i7 (22 nm) ====
Model	sSpec number	Cores	Clock rate	Turbo	L2 cache	L3 cache	GPU model	GPU frequency	TDP	Socket	I/O bus	Release date	Part number(s)	Release price (USD)
Core i7-4500U	SR16Z (C0)	2	1.8 GHz	9/12	2 × 256 KB	4 MB	HD Graphics 4400	200–1100 MHz	15 W	BGA-1168	DMI 2.0	June 2013	CL8064701477202	$398
Core i7-4510U	SR1EB (D0)	2	2 GHz	8/11	2 × 256 KB	4 MB	HD Graphics 4400	200–1100 MHz	15 W	BGA-1168	DMI 2.0	April 2014	CL8064701477301	$393
Core i7-4550U	SR16J (C0)	2	1.5 GHz	12/15	2 × 256 KB	4 MB	HD Graphics 5000	200–1100 MHz	15 W	BGA-1168	DMI 2.0	June 2013	CL8064701462901	$454
Core i7-4600U	SR1EA (D0)	2	2.1 GHz	9/12	2 × 256 KB	4 MB	HD Graphics 4400	200–1100 MHz	15 W	BGA-1168	DMI 2.0	September 2013	CL8064701477000	$398
Core i7-4650U	SR16H (C0)	2	1.7 GHz	12/16	2 × 256 KB	4 MB	HD Graphics 5000	200–1100 MHz	15 W	BGA-1168	DMI 2.0	June 2013	CL8064701462800	$454
Core i7-4610Y	SR18D (D0)	2	1.7 GHz	9/12	2 × 256 KB	4 MB	HD Graphics 4200	200–850 MHz	11.5 W	BGA-1168	DMI 2.0	September 2013	CL8064701512303	$415

=== Based on the Broadwell microarchitecture ===
==== Celeron (14 nm) ====
Model	sSpec number	Cores	Clock rate	Turbo	L2 cache	L3 cache	GPU model	GPU frequency	TDP	Socket	I/O bus	Release date	Part number(s)	Release price (USD)
Celeron 3205U	SR215 (E0)	2	1.5 GHz	—N/a	2 × 256 KB	2 MB	HD Graphics (12 EUs)	100–800 MHz	15 W	BGA-1168	DMI 2.0	January 2015	FH8065801882800	$107
Celeron 3755U	SR211 (E0)	2	1.7 GHz	—N/a	2 × 256 KB	2 MB	HD Graphics (12 EUs)	100–800 MHz	15 W	BGA-1168	DMI 2.0	January 2015	FH8065801620801	$107

==== Pentium (14 nm) ====
Model	sSpec number	Cores	Clock rate	Turbo	L2 cache	L3 cache	GPU model	GPU frequency	TDP	Socket	I/O bus	Release date	Part number(s)	Release price (USD)
Pentium 3805U	SR210 (E0)	2	1.9 GHz	—N/a	2 × 256 KB	2 MB	HD Graphics (12 EUs)	100–800 MHz	15 W	BGA-1168	DMI 2.0	January 2015	FH8065801620702	$161
Pentium 3825U	SR24B (F0)	2	1.9 GHz	—N/a	2 × 256 KB	2 MB	HD Graphics (12 EUs)	300–850 MHz	15 W	BGA-1168	DMI 2.0	March 2015	FH8065801620705	$161

==== Core i3 (14 nm) ====
Model	sSpec number	Cores	Clock rate	Turbo	L2 cache	L3 cache	GPU model	GPU frequency	TDP	Socket	I/O bus	Release date	Part number(s)	Release price (USD)
Core i3-5005U	SR244 (F0); SR27G (F0)	2	2 GHz	—N/a	2 × 256 KB	3 MB	HD Graphics 5500	300–850 MHz	15 W	BGA-1168	DMI 2.0	January 2015	FH8065801884006	$275
Core i3-5010U	SR23Z (F0)	2	2.1 GHz	—N/a	2 × 256 KB	3 MB	HD Graphics 5500	300–900 MHz	15 W	BGA-1168	DMI 2.0	January 2015	FH8065801620406	$281
Core i3-5015U	SR245 (F0)	2	2.1 GHz	—N/a	2 × 256 KB	3 MB	HD Graphics 5500	300–850 MHz	15 W	BGA-1168	DMI 2.0	March 2015	FH8065801884007	$275
Core i3-5020U	SR240 (F0)	2	2.2 GHz	—N/a	2 × 256 KB	3 MB	HD Graphics 5500	300–900 MHz	15 W	BGA-1168	DMI 2.0	March 2015	FH8065801620407	$281

==== Core i5 (14 nm) ====
Model	sSpec number	Cores	Clock rate	Turbo	L2 cache	L3 cache	GPU model	GPU frequency	TDP	Socket	I/O bus	Release date	Part number(s)	Release price (USD)
Core i5-5200U	SR23Y (F0)	2	2.2 GHz	3/5	2 × 256 KB	3 MB	HD Graphics 5500	300–900 MHz	15 W	BGA-1168	DMI 2.0	January 2015	FH8065801620204	$281
Core i5-5250U	SR26C (F0)	2	1.6 GHz	9/11	2 × 256 KB	3 MB	HD Graphics 6000	300–1000 MHz	15 W	BGA-1168	DMI 2.0	January 2015	FH8065802063410	$315
Core i5-5300U	SR23X (F0)	2	2.3 GHz	4/6	2 × 256 KB	3 MB	HD Graphics 5500	300–900 MHz	15 W	BGA-1168	DMI 2.0	January 2015	FH8065801620104	$281
Core i5-5350U	SR268 (F0)	2	1.8 GHz	9/11	2 × 256 KB	3 MB	HD Graphics 6000	300–1000 MHz	15 W	BGA-1168	DMI 2.0	January 2015	FH8065802063212	$315

==== Core i7 (14 nm) ====
Model	sSpec number	Cores	Clock rate	Turbo	L2 cache	L3 cache	GPU model	GPU frequency	TDP	Socket	I/O bus	Release date	Part number(s)	Release price (USD)
Core i7-5500U	SR23W (F0)	2	2.4 GHz	5/6	2 × 256 KB	4 MB	HD Graphics 5500	300–950 MHz	15 W	BGA-1168	DMI 2.0	January 2015	FH8065801620004	$393
Core i7-5550U	SR26A (F0)	2	2 GHz	9/10	2 × 256 KB	4 MB	HD Graphics 6000	300–1000 MHz	15 W	BGA-1168	DMI 2.0	January 2015	FH8065802063310	$426
Core i7-5600U	SR23V (F0)	2	2.6 GHz	5/6	2 × 256 KB	4 MB	HD Graphics 5500	300–950 MHz	15 W	BGA-1168	DMI 2.0	January 2015	FH8065801618304	$393
Core i7-5650U	SR267 (F0)	2	2.2 GHz	9/10	2 × 256 KB	4 MB	HD Graphics 6000	300–1000 MHz	15 W	BGA-1168	DMI 2.0	January 2015	FH8065801974816	$426

==== Core M (14 nm) ====
Model	sSpec number	Cores	Clock rate	Turbo	L2 cache	L3 cache	GPU model	GPU frequency	TDP	Socket	I/O bus	Release date	Part number(s)	Release price (USD)
Core M-5Y10	SR217 (E0)	2	800 MHz	2 GHz	2 × 256 KB	4 MB	HD Graphics 5300	100–800 MHz	4.5 W	BGA-1234	DMI 2.0	September 2014	FH8065801879602	$281
Core M-5Y10a	SR218 (E0)	2	800 MHz	2 GHz	2 × 256 KB	4 MB	HD Graphics 5300	100–800 MHz	4.5 W	BGA-1234	DMI 2.0	September 2014	FH8065801988602	$281
Core M-5Y10c	SR23C (F0)	2	800 MHz	2 GHz	2 × 256 KB	4 MB	HD Graphics 5300	300–800 MHz	4.5 W	BGA-1234	DMI 2.0	October 2014	FH8065802062002	$281
Core M-5Y31	SR23G (F0)	2	900 MHz	2.4 GHz	2 × 256 KB	4 MB	HD Graphics 5300	300–850 MHz	4.5 W	BGA-1234	DMI 2.0	October 2014	FH8065802061902	$281
Core M-5Y51	SR23L (F0)	2	1.1 GHz	2.6 GHz	2 × 256 KB	4 MB	HD Graphics 5300	300–900 MHz	4.5 W	BGA-1234	DMI 2.0	October 2014	FH8065802061802	$281
Core M-5Y70	SR216 (E0)	2	1.1 GHz	2.6 GHz	2 × 256 KB	4 MB	HD Graphics 5300	100–850 MHz	4.5 W	BGA-1234	DMI 2.0	September 2014	FH8065801875604	$281
Core M-5Y71	SR23Q (F0)	2	1.2 GHz	2.9 GHz	2 × 256 KB	4 MB	HD Graphics 5300	300–900 MHz	4.5 W	BGA-1234	DMI 2.0	October 2014	FH8065802061602	$281

=== Based on the Skylake microarchitecture ===
==== Pentium (14 nm) ====
Model	sSpec number	Cores (threads)	Clock rate	Turbo	L2 cache	L3 cache	GPU model	GPU frequency	TDP	Socket	I/O bus	Release date	Part number(s)	Release price (USD)
Pentium 4405U	SR2EX (D1)	2 ()	2.1 GHz	—N/a	2 × 256 KB	2 MB	HD Graphics 510	300–950 MHz	15 W	BGA 1356	DMI 3.0	September 2015	FJ8066201930905	$161
Pentium 4405Y	SR2ER (D1)	2 ()	1.5 GHz	—N/a	2 × 256 KB	2 MB	HD Graphics 510	300–800 MHz	6 W	BGA 1515	DMI 3.0	September 2015	HE8066201931229	$161

==== Core i3 (14 nm) ====
Model	sSpec number	Cores (threads)	Clock rate	Turbo	L2 cache	L3 cache	GPU model	GPU frequency	TDP	Socket	I/O bus	Release date	Part number(s)	Release price (USD)
Core i3-6100U	SR2EU (D1)	2 ()	2.3 GHz	—N/a	2 × 256 KB	3 MB	HD Graphics 520	300–1000 MHz	15 W	BGA 1356	DMI 3.0	September 2015	FJ8066201931104	$281

==== Core i5 (14 nm) ====
Model	sSpec number	Cores (threads)	Clock rate	Turbo	L2 cache	L3 cache	GPU model	GPU frequency	TDP	Socket	I/O bus	Release date	Part number(s)	Release price (USD)
Core i5-6200U	SR2EY (D1)	2 ()	2.3 GHz	4/5	2 × 256 KB	3 MB	HD Graphics 520	300–1000 MHz	15 W	BGA 1356	DMI 3.0	September 2015	FJ8066201930409	$281
Core i5-6260U	SR2JC (K1)	2 ()	1.8 GHz	9/11	2 × 256 KB	4 MB	Iris Graphics 540	300–950 MHz	15 W	BGA 1356	DMI 3.0	September 2015	FJ8066202496511	$304
Core i5-6300U	SR2F0 (D1)	2 ()	2.4 GHz	5/6	2 × 256 KB	3 MB	HD Graphics 520	300–1000 MHz	15 W	BGA 1356	DMI 3.0	September 2015	FJ8066201924931	$281
Core i5-6360U	SR2JM (K1)	2 ()	2 GHz	9/11	2 × 256 KB	4 MB	Iris Graphics 540	300–1000 MHz	15 W	BGA 1356	DMI 3.0	September 2015	FJ8066202499208	$304

==== Core i7 (14 nm) ====
Model	sSpec number	Cores (threads)	Clock rate	Turbo	L2 cache	L3 cache	GPU model	GPU frequency	TDP	Socket	I/O bus	Release date	Part number(s)	Release price (USD)
Core i7-6500U	SR2EZ (D1)	2 ()	2.5 GHz	5/6	2 × 256 KB	4 MB	HD Graphics 520	300–1050 MHz	15 W	BGA 1356	DMI 3.0	September 2015	FJ8066201930408	$393
Core i7-6560U		2 ()	2.2 GHz	9/10	2 × 256 KB	4 MB	Iris Graphics 540	300–1050 MHz	15 W	BGA 1356	DMI 3.0	September 2015		
Core i7-6600U	SR2F1 (D1)	2 ()	2.6 GHz	6/8	2 × 256 KB	4 MB	HD Graphics 520	300–1050 MHz	15 W	BGA 1356	DMI 3.0	September 2015	FJ8066201924950	$393
Core i7-6650U	SR2KA (K1)	2 ()	2.2 GHz	10/12	2 × 256 KB	4 MB	Iris Graphics 540	300–1050 MHz	15 W	BGA 1356	DMI 3.0	September 2015	FJ8066202499212	$415
Core i7-6660U	SR2JL (K1)	2 ()	2.4 GHz	9/10	2 × 256 KB	4 MB	Iris Graphics 540	300–1050 MHz	15 W	BGA 1356	DMI 3.0	March 2016	FJ8066202499207	$415

==== Core m (14 nm) ====
Model	sSpec number	Cores (threads)	Clock rate	Turbo	L2 cache	L3 cache	GPU model	GPU frequency	TDP	Socket	I/O bus	Release date	Part number(s)	Release price (USD)
Core m3-6Y30	SR2EN (D1)	2 ()	900 MHz	2.2 GHz	2 × 256 KB	4 MB	HD Graphics 515	300–850 MHz	4.5 W	BGA 1515	DMI 3.0	September 2015	HE8066201930521	$281
Core m5-6Y54	SR2EM (D1)	2 ()	1.1 GHz	2.7 GHz	2 × 256 KB	4 MB	HD Graphics 515	300–900 MHz	4.5 W	BGA 1515	DMI 3.0	September 2015	HE8066201930524	$281
Core m5-6Y57	SR2EG (D1)	2 ()	1.1 GHz	2.8 GHz	2 × 256 KB	4 MB	HD Graphics 515	300–900 MHz	4.5 W	BGA 1515	DMI 3.0	September 2015	HE8066201922876	$281
Core m7-6Y75	SR2EH (D1)	2 ()	1.2 GHz	3.1 GHz	2 × 256 KB	4 MB	HD Graphics 515	300–1000 MHz	4.5 W	BGA 1515	DMI 3.0	September 2015	HE8066201922875	$393

=== Based on the Kaby Lake microarchitecture ===
==== Core i3 (14 nm) ====
Model	sSpec number	Cores (threads)	Clock rate	Turbo	L2 cache	L3 cache	GPU model	GPU frequency	TDP	Socket	I/O bus	Release date	Part number(s)	Release price (USD)
Core i3-7020U	SR3LD (Y0)	2 ()	2.3 GHz	—N/a	2 × 256 KB	3 MB	HD Graphics 620	300–1000 MHz	15 W	BGA 1356	DMI 3.0	Q2 2018	FJ8067703282620	$281
Core i3-7100U	SR2ZW (H0)	2 ()	2.4 GHz	—N/a	2 × 256 KB	3 MB	HD Graphics 620	300–1000 MHz	15 W	BGA 1356	DMI 3.0	September 2016	FJ8067702739738	$281
Core i3-7130U	SR3JY (H0)	2 ()	2.7 GHz	—N/a	2 × 256 KB	3 MB	HD Graphics 620	300–1000 MHz	15 W	BGA 1356	DMI 3.0	June 2017	FJ8067702739765	$281

==== Core i5 (14 nm) ====
Model	sSpec number	Cores (threads)	Clock rate	Turbo	L2 cache	L3 cache	GPU model	GPU frequency	TDP	Socket	I/O bus	Release date	Part number(s)	Release price (USD)
Core i5-7200U	SR2ZU (H0)	2 ()	2.5 GHz	3.1 GHz	2 × 256 KB	3 MB	HD Graphics 620	300–1000 MHz	15 W	BGA 1356	DMI 3.0	September 2016	FJ8067702739739	$281
Core i5-7260U	SR363 (J1)	2 ()	2.2 GHz	3.4 GHz	2 × 256 KB	3 MB	Iris Plus Graphics 640	300–950 MHz	15 W	BGA 1356	DMI 3.0	January 2017	FH8067703037209	$281
Core i5-7300U	SR340 (H0)	2 ()	2.6 GHz	3.5 GHz	2 × 256 KB	3 MB	HD Graphics 620	300–1100 MHz	15 W	BGA 1356	DMI 3.0	January 2017	FJ8067702739633	$281
Core i5-7360U	SR365 (J1)	2 ()	2.3 GHz	3.6 GHz	2 × 256 KB	3 MB	Iris Plus Graphics 640	300–1000 MHz	15 W	BGA 1356	DMI 3.0	January 2017	FH8067703037109	$281
Core i5-7Y54	SR2ZX (H0)	2 ()	1.2 GHz	3.2 GHz	2 × 256 KB	4 MB	HD Graphics 615	300–950 MHz	4.5 W	BGA 1515	DMI 3.0	September 2016	HE8067702739826	$281
Core i5-7Y57	SR33Y (H0)	2 ()	1.2 GHz	3.3 GHz	2 × 256 KB	4 MB	HD Graphics 615	300–950 MHz	4.5 W	BGA 1515	DMI 3.0	January 2017	HE8067702739527	$281

==== Core i7 (14 nm) ====
Model	sSpec number	Cores (threads)	Clock rate	Turbo	L2 cache	L3 cache	GPU model	GPU frequency	TDP	Socket	I/O bus	Release date	Part number(s)	Release price (USD)
Core i7-7500U	SR2VM (H0)	2 ()	2.5 GHz	3.1 GHz	2 × 256 KB	4 MB	HD Graphics 620	300–1050 MHz	15 W	BGA 1356	DMI 3.0	September 2016	FJ8067702739740	$393
Core i7-7560U	SR366 (J1)	2 ()	2.2 GHz	3.4 GHz	2 × 256 KB	4 MB	Iris Plus Graphics 640	300–1050 MHz	15 W	BGA 1356	DMI 3.0	January 2017	FH8067703037007	$393
Core i7-7600U	SR33Z (H0)	2 ()	2.6 GHz	3.5 GHz	2 × 256 KB	4 MB	HD Graphics 620	300–1150 MHz	15 W	BGA 1356	DMI 3.0	January 2017	FJ8067702739628	$393
Core i7-7660U	SR368 (J1)	2 ()	2.3 GHz	3.6 GHz	2 × 256 KB	4 MB	Iris Plus Graphics 640	300–1100 MHz	15 W	BGA 1356	DMI 3.0	January 2017	FH8067703036924	$393
Core i7-7Y75	SR2VK (H0)	2 ()	1.3 GHz	3.6 GHz	2 × 256 KB	4 MB	HD Graphics 615	300–1050 MHz	4.5 W	BGA 1515	DMI 3.0	September 2016	HE8067702739526	$393

==== Core m (14 nm) ====
Model	sSpec number	Cores (threads)	Clock rate	Turbo	L2 cache	L3 cache	GPU model	GPU frequency	TDP	Socket	I/O bus	Release date	Part number(s)	Release price (USD)
Core m3-7Y30	SR2ZY (H0)	2 ()	1 GHz	2.6 GHz	2 × 256 KB	4 MB	HD Graphics 615	300–900 MHz	4.5 W	BGA 1515	DMI 3.0	September 2016	HE8067702739824	$281
Core m3-7Y32	SR346 (H0)	2 ()	1.1 GHz	3.0 GHz	2 × 256 KB	4 MB	HD Graphics 615	300–900 MHz	4.5 W	BGA 1515	DMI 3.0	April 2017	HE8067702739830	$281

=== Based on the Coffee Lake microarchitecture ===
Processor branding	Model	Cores (threads)	CPU clock rate (GHz)		GPU			L3 cache	L4 cache (eDRAM)	TDP	cTDP	Price (USD)
Processor branding	Model	Cores (threads)	Base	Max. Turbo	Model	clock rate		L3 cache	L4 cache (eDRAM)	TDP	cTDP	Price (USD)
Processor branding	Model	Cores (threads)	Base	Max. Turbo	Model	Base (MHz)	Max. (GHz)	L3 cache	L4 cache (eDRAM)	TDP	Down	Price (USD)
Core i7	8569U	4 (8)	2.8	4.7	Iris Plus 655	300	1.20	8 MB	128 MB	28 W	—N/a	$431
Core i7	8559U	4 (8)	2.7	4.5	Iris Plus 655	300		8 MB	128 MB	28 W	20	$431
Core i7	8557U	4 (8)	1.7	4.5	Iris Plus 645	300	1.15	8 MB	128 MB	15 W	—N/a	OEM
Core i5	8279U	4 (8)	2.4	4.1	Iris Plus 655	300	1.15	6 MB	128 MB	28 W	—N/a	$320
Core i5	8269U	4 (8)	2.6	4.2	Iris Plus 655	300	1.10	6 MB	128 MB	28 W	20	$320
Core i5	8259U	4 (8)	2.3	3.8	Iris Plus 655	300	1.05	6 MB	128 MB	28 W	20	$320
Core i5	8260U	4 (8)	1.6	3.9	UHD 620	300	1.10	6 MB	—N/a	15 W	10 W	OEM
Core i5	8257U	4 (8)	1.4	3.9	Iris Plus 645	300	1.05	6 MB	128 MB	15 W	—N/a	OEM
Core i3	8109U	2 (4)	3.0	3.6	Iris Plus 655	300	1.05	4 MB	128 MB	28 W	20 W	$304

==== Kaby Lake Refresh ====
Processor branding	Model	Cores (Threads)	Clock rate (GHz)		Integrated GPU		Smart Cache	TDP	Release date
Processor branding	Model	Cores (Threads)	Base	Turbo	Model	Clock (MHz)	Smart Cache	TDP	Release date
Core i7	8650U	4 (8)	1.9	4.2	UHD 620	300–1150	8 MB	15 W	August 2017
Core i7	8550U	4 (8)	1.8	4.0	UHD 620	300–1150	8 MB	15 W	August 2017
Core i5	8350U	4 (8)	1.7	3.6	UHD 620	300–1100	6 MB	15 W	August 2017
Core i5	8250U	4 (8)	1.6	3.4	UHD 620	300–1100	6 MB	15 W	August 2017
Core i3	8130U	2 (4)	2.2	3.4	UHD 620	300–1000	4 MB	15 W	February 2018

==== Amber Lake-Y ====
Processor branding	Model	Cores (Threads)	Clock rate (GHz)		Integrated GPU		Smart Cache	TDP	Release date
Processor branding	Model	Cores (Threads)	Base	Turbo	Model	Clock (MHz)	Smart Cache	TDP	Release date
Core i7	8500Y	2 (4)	1.5	4.2	UHD 615	300–1050	4 MB	5 W	August 2018
Core i5	8310Y	2 (4)	1.6	3.9	UHD 617	300–1050	4 MB	7 W	Q1 2019
Core i5	8210Y	2 (4)	1.6	3.6	UHD 617	300–1050	4 MB	7 W	October 2018
Core i5	8200Y	2 (4)	1.3	3.9	UHD 615	300–950	4 MB	5 W	August 2018

=== Based on the Comet Lake microarchitecture ===
==== Comet Lake-U ====
Processor branding	Model	Cores (Threads)	Clock rate (GHz)		Integrated GPU		Smart Cache	TDP	Release date
Processor branding	Model	Cores (Threads)	Base	Turbo	Model	Clock (MHz)	Smart Cache	TDP	Release date
Core i7	10810U	6 (12)	1.1	4.7	UHD 620	300–1150	12 MB	15 W	May 2020
Core i7	10710U	6 (12)	1.1	4.7	UHD 620	300–1150	12 MB	15 W	August 2019
Core i7	10610U	4 (8)	1.8	4.9	UHD 620	300–1150	8 MB	15 W	May 2020
Core i7	10510U	4 (8)	1.8	4.9	UHD 620	300–1150	8 MB	15 W	August 2019
Core i5	10310U	4 (8)	1.7	4.4	UHD 620	300–1150	6 MB	15 W	May 2020
Core i5	10210U	4 (8)	1.6	4.2	UHD 620	300–1100	6 MB	15 W	August 2019
Core i3	10110U	2 (4)	2.1	4.1	UHD 620	300–1000	4 MB	15 W	August 2019

==== Amber Lake-Y (10xxx) ====
Processor branding	Model	Cores (Threads)	Clock rate (GHz)		Integrated GPU		Smart Cache	TDP	Release date
Processor branding	Model	Cores (Threads)	Base	Turbo	Model	Clock (MHz)	Smart Cache	TDP	Release date
Core i7	10510Y	4 (8)	1.2	4.5	UHD 620	300–1150	8 MB	7 W	August 2019
Core i5	10310Y	4 (8)	1.1	4.1	UHD 620	300–1050	6 MB	7 W	August 2019
Core i5	10210Y	4 (8)	1.0	4.0	UHD 620	300–1050	6 MB	7 W	August 2019
Core i3	10110Y	2 (4)	1.0	4.0	UHD 620	300–1000	4 MB	7 W	August 2019
Core i3	10100Y	2 (4)	1.3	3.9	UHD 615	300–1000	4 MB	5 W	January 2021

=== Based on the Ice Lake microarchitecture ===
==== Ice Lake-U ====
Processor branding	Model	Cores (Threads)	Clock rate (GHz)		Integrated GPU		Smart Cache	TDP	Release date
Processor branding	Model	Cores (Threads)	Base	Turbo	Model	Clock (MHz)	Smart Cache	TDP	Release date
Core i7	1068NG7	4 (8)	2.3	4.1	Iris Plus (G7)	300–1100	8 MB	28 W	May 2020
Core i7	1068G7	4 (8)	2.3	4.1	Iris Plus (G7)	300–1100	8 MB	28 W	August 2019
Core i7	1065G7	4 (8)	1.3	3.9	Iris Plus (G7)	300–1100	8 MB	15 W	August 2019
Core i5	1038NG7	4 (8)	2.0	3.8	Iris Plus (G7)	300–1050	6 MB	28 W	May 2020
Core i5	1035G7	4 (8)	1.2	3.7	Iris Plus (G7)	300–1050	6 MB	15 W	August 2019
Core i5	1035G4	4 (8)	1.1	3.7	Iris Plus (G4)	300–1050	6 MB	15 W	August 2019
Core i5	1035G1	4 (8)	1.0	3.6	UHD Graphics (G1)	300–1050	6 MB	15 W	August 2019
Core i3	1005G1	2 (4)	1.2	3.4	UHD Graphics (G1)	300–900	4 MB	15 W	August 2019

==== Ice Lake-Y ====
Processor branding	Model	Cores (Threads)	Clock rate (GHz)		Integrated GPU		Smart Cache	TDP	Release date
Processor branding	Model	Cores (Threads)	Base	Turbo	Model	Clock (MHz)	Smart Cache	TDP	Release date
Core i7	1060G7	4 (8)	1.0	3.8	Iris Plus (G7)	300–1100	8 MB	9 W	Q3 2019
Core i5	1030NG7	4 (8)	1.1	3.5	Iris Plus (G7)	300–1050	6 MB	10 W	Q2 2020
Core i5	1030G7	4 (8)	0.8	3.5	Iris Plus (G7)	300–1050	6 MB	9 W	Q3 2019
Core i5	1030G4	4 (8)	0.7	3.5	Iris Plus (G4)	300–1050	6 MB	9 W	Q3 2019
Core i3	1000NG4	2 (4)	1.1	3.2	Iris Plus (G4)	300–900	4 MB	9 W	Q2 2020
Core i3	1000G4	2 (4)	1.1	3.2	Iris Plus (G4)	300–900	4 MB	9 W	Q3 2019
Core i3	1000G1	2 (4)	1.1	3.2	UHD Graphics (G1)	300–900	4 MB	9 W	Q3 2019

=== Based on the Tiger Lake microarchitecture ===
==== Tiger Lake-UP3 ====
Processor branding	Model	Cores (Threads)	Clock rate (GHz)		Integrated GPU		Smart Cache	TDP	Release date
Processor branding	Model	Cores (Threads)	Base	Turbo	Model	Clock (MHz)	Smart Cache	TDP	Release date
Core i7	1195G7	4 (8)	1.3–2.9	5.0	Iris Xe (96 EU)	?–1400	12 MB	12–28 W	June 2021
Core i7	1185G7	4 (8)	1.2–3.0	4.8	Iris Xe (96 EU)	?–1350	12 MB	12–28 W	September 2020
Core i7	1165G7	4 (8)	1.2–2.8	4.7	Iris Xe (96 EU)	?–1300	12 MB	12–28 W	September 2020
Core i5	1155G7	4 (8)	1.0–2.5	4.5	Iris Xe (80 EU)	?–1350	8 MB	12–28 W	June 2021
Core i5	1145G7	4 (8)	1.1–2.6	4.4	Iris Xe (80 EU)	?–1300	8 MB	12–28 W	January 2021
Core i5	1135G7	4 (8)	0.9–2.4	4.2	Iris Xe (80 EU)	?–1300	8 MB	12–28 W	September 2020
Core i3	1125G4	4 (8)	0.9–2.0	3.7	UHD Graphics (48 EU)	?–1250	8 MB	12–28 W	Q1 2021
Core i3	1115G4	2 (4)	1.7–3.0	4.1	UHD Graphics (48 EU)	?–1250	6 MB	12–28 W	September 2020

==== Tiger Lake-UP4 ====
Processor branding	Model	Cores (Threads)	Clock rate (GHz)		Integrated GPU		Smart Cache	TDP	Release date
Processor branding	Model	Cores (Threads)	Base	Turbo	Model	Clock (MHz)	Smart Cache	TDP	Release date
Core i7	1180G7	4 (8)	0.9–2.2	4.6	Iris Xe (96 EU)	?–1100	12 MB	7–15 W	January 2021
Core i7	1160G7	4 (8)	0.9–2.1	4.4	Iris Xe (96 EU)	?–1100	12 MB	7–15 W	September 2020
Core i5	1140G7	4 (8)	0.8–1.8	4.2	Iris Xe (80 EU)	?–1100	8 MB	7–15 W	January 2021
Core i5	1130G7	4 (8)	0.8–1.8	4.0	Iris Xe (80 EU)	?–1100	8 MB	7–15 W	September 2020
Core i3	1120G4	4 (8)	0.8–1.5	3.5	UHD Graphics (48 EU)	?–1100	8 MB	7–15 W	Q1 2021
Core i3	1110G4	2 (4)	1.8	3.9	UHD Graphics (48 EU)	?–1100	6 MB	7–15 W	September 2020

=== Based on the Alder Lake microarchitecture ===
==== Alder Lake-U ====
Processor branding	Model	P-core (performance)			E-core (efficiency)			Integrated GPU		Smart Cache	TDP		Release date
Processor branding	Model	Cores (Threads)	Clock rate (GHz)		Cores (Threads)	Clock rate (GHz)		Model	Clock (MHz)	Smart Cache	Base	Max. Turbo	Release date
Processor branding	Model	Cores (Threads)	Base	Turbo	Cores (Threads)	Base	Turbo	Model	Clock (MHz)	Smart Cache	Base	Max. Turbo	Release date
Core i7	1265U	2 (4)	1.8	4.8	8 (8)	1.3	3.6	Iris Xe (96 EU)	?–1250	12 MB	15 W	55 W	February 2022
Core i7	1260U	2 (4)	1.6	4.7	8 (8)	0.8	3.5	Iris Xe (96 EU)	?–950	12 MB	9 W	29 W	February 2022
Core i7	1255U	2 (4)	1.7	4.7	8 (8)	1.2	3.5	Iris Xe (96 EU)	?–1250	12 MB	15 W	55 W	February 2022
Core i7	1250U	2 (4)	1.1	4.7	8 (8)	0.8	3.5	Iris Xe (96 EU)	?–950	12 MB	9 W	29 W	February 2022
Core i5	1245U	2 (4)	1.6	4.4	8 (8)	1.2	3.3	Iris Xe (80 EU)	?–1200	12 MB	15 W	55 W	February 2022
Core i5	1240U	2 (4)	1.1	4.4	8 (8)	0.8	3.3	Iris Xe (80 EU)	?–900	12 MB	9 W	29 W	February 2022
Core i5	1235U	2 (4)	1.3	4.4	8 (8)	0.9	3.3	Iris Xe (80 EU)	?–1200	12 MB	15 W	55 W	February 2022
Core i5	1230U	2 (4)	1.0	4.4	8 (8)	0.7	3.3	Iris Xe (80 EU)	?–850	12 MB	9 W	29 W	February 2022
Core i3	1215U	2 (4)	1.2	4.4	4 (4)	0.9	3.3	UHD Graphics (64 EU)	?–1100	10 MB	15 W	55 W	February 2022
Core i3	1210U	2 (4)	1.0	4.4	4 (4)	0.7	3.3	UHD Graphics (64 EU)	?–850	10 MB	9 W	29 W	February 2022

=== Based on the Raptor Lake microarchitecture ===
==== Raptor Lake-U ====
Processor branding	Model	P-core (performance)			E-core (efficiency)			Integrated GPU		Smart Cache	TDP		Release date
Processor branding	Model	Cores (Threads)	Clock rate (GHz)		Cores (Threads)	Clock rate (GHz)		Model	Clock (MHz)	Smart Cache	Base	Max. Turbo	Release date
Processor branding	Model	Cores (Threads)	Base	Turbo	Cores (Threads)	Base	Turbo	Model	Clock (MHz)	Smart Cache	Base	Max. Turbo	Release date
Core i7	1365U	2 (4)	1.8	5.2	8 (8)	1.3	3.9	Iris Xe (96 EU)	?–1300	12 MB	15 W	55 W	January 2023
Core i7	1355U	2 (4)	1.7	5.0	8 (8)	1.2	3.7	Iris Xe (96 EU)	?–1300	12 MB	15 W	55 W	January 2023
Core i5	1345U	2 (4)	1.6	4.7	8 (8)	1.2	3.5	Iris Xe (80 EU)	?–1250	12 MB	15 W	55 W	January 2023
Core i5	1335U	2 (4)	1.3	4.6	8 (8)	0.9	3.4	Iris Xe (80 EU)	?–1250	12 MB	15 W	55 W	January 2023
Core i5	1334U	2 (4)	1.3	4.6	8 (8)	0.9	3.4	Iris Xe (80 EU)	?–1250	12 MB	15 W	55 W	January 2023
Core i3	1315U	2 (4)	1.2	4.5	4 (4)	0.9	3.3	UHD Graphics (64 EU)	?–1250	10 MB	15 W	55 W	January 2023
Core i3	1305U	1 (2)	1.6	4.5	4 (4)	1.2	3.3	UHD Graphics (64 EU)	?–1250	10 MB	15 W	55 W	January 2023

==== Raptor Lake-U Refresh ====
Processor branding	Model	P-core (performance)			E-core (efficiency)			Integrated GPU		Smart Cache	TDP		Release date
Processor branding	Model	Cores (Threads)	Clock rate (GHz)		Cores (Threads)	Clock rate (GHz)		Model	Clock (MHz)	Smart Cache	Base	Max. Turbo	Release date
Processor branding	Model	Cores (Threads)	Base	Turbo	Cores (Threads)	Base	Turbo	Model	Clock (MHz)	Smart Cache	Base	Max. Turbo	Release date
Core 7	150U	2 (4)	1.8	5.4	8 (8)	1.2	4.0	Intel Graphics (96 EU)	?–1300	12 MB	15 W	55 W	January 2024
Core 5	120U	2 (4)	1.4	5.0	8 (8)	0.9	3.8	Intel Graphics (80 EU)	?–1250	12 MB	15 W	55 W	January 2024
Core 3	100U	2 (4)	1.2	4.7	4 (4)	0.9	3.3	Intel Graphics (64 EU)	?–1250	10 MB	15 W	55 W	January 2024

==== Raptor Lake-U Refresh ====
Processor branding	Model	P-core (performance)			E-core (efficiency)			Integrated GPU		Smart Cache	TDP		Release date
Processor branding	Model	Cores (Threads)	Clock rate (GHz)		Cores (Threads)	Clock rate (GHz)		Model	Clock (MHz)	Smart Cache	Base	Max. Turbo	Release date
Processor branding	Model	Cores (Threads)	Base	Turbo	Cores (Threads)	Base	Turbo	Model	Clock (MHz)	Smart Cache	Base	Max. Turbo	Release date
Core 7	250U	2 (4)	1.8	5.4	8 (8)	1.2	4.0	Intel Graphics (96 EU)	?–1300	12 MB	15 W	55 W	January 2025
Core 5	220U	2 (4)	1.4	5.0	8 (8)	0.9	3.8	Intel Graphics (80 EU)	?–1300	12 MB	15 W	55 W	January 2025

=== Based on the Meteor Lake microarchitecture ===
==== Meteor Lake-U ====
Processor branding	Model	P-core (performance)			E-core (efficiency)			Integrated GPU		Smart Cache	TDP		Release date
Processor branding	Model	Cores (Threads)	Clock rate (GHz)		Cores (Threads)	Clock rate (GHz)		Model	Clock (MHz)	Smart Cache	Base	Max. Turbo	Release date
Processor branding	Model	Cores (Threads)	Base	Turbo	Cores (Threads)	Base	Turbo	Model	Clock (MHz)	Smart Cache	Base	Max. Turbo	Release date
Core Ultra 7	165U	2 (4)	1.7	4.9	8 (8)	1.2	3.8	Intel Graphics (4 Xe-cores)	?–2000	12 MB	15 W	57 W	December 2023
Core Ultra 7	164U	2 (4)	1.1	4.8	8 (8)	0.7	3.8	Intel Graphics (4 Xe-cores)	?–1800	12 MB	9 W	30 W	December 2023
Core Ultra 7	155U	2 (4)	1.7	4.8	8 (8)	1.2	3.8	Intel Graphics (4 Xe-cores)	?–1950	12 MB	15 W	57 W	December 2023
Core Ultra 5	135U	2 (4)	1.6	4.4	8 (8)	1.1	3.6	Intel Graphics (4 Xe-cores)	?–1900	12 MB	15 W	57 W	December 2023
Core Ultra 5	134U	2 (4)	0.7	4.4	8 (8)	0.5	3.6	Intel Graphics (4 Xe-cores)	?–1750	12 MB	9 W	30 W	December 2023
Core Ultra 5	125U	2 (4)	1.3	4.3	8 (8)	0.8	3.6	Intel Graphics (4 Xe-cores)	?–1850	12 MB	15 W	57 W	December 2023
Core Ultra 5	115U	2 (4)	1.5	4.2	4 (4)	1.0	3.5	Intel Graphics (3 Xe-cores)	?–1800	10 MB	15 W	57 W	December 2023

=== Based on the Arrow Lake microarchitecture ===
==== Arrow Lake-U ====
Processor branding	Model	P-core (performance)			E-core (efficiency)			Integrated GPU		Smart Cache	TDP		Release date
Processor branding	Model	Cores (Threads)	Clock rate (GHz)		Cores (Threads)	Clock rate (GHz)		Model	Clock (MHz)	Smart Cache	Base	Max. Turbo	Release date
Processor branding	Model	Cores (Threads)	Base	Turbo	Cores (Threads)	Base	Turbo	Model	Clock (MHz)	Smart Cache	Base	Max. Turbo	Release date
Core Ultra 7	265U	2 (4)	2.1	5.3	8 (8)	1.7	4.2	Intel Graphics (4 Xe-cores)	?–2100	12 MB	15 W	57 W	January 2025
Core Ultra 7	255U	2 (4)	2.0	5.2	8 (8)	1.7	4.2	Intel Graphics (4 Xe-cores)	?–2100	12 MB	15 W	57 W	January 2025
Core Ultra 5	235U	2 (4)	2.0	4.9	8 (8)	1.6	4.1	Intel Graphics (4 Xe-cores)	?–2050	12 MB	15 W	57 W	January 2025
Core Ultra 5	225U	2 (4)	1.5	4.8	8 (8)	1.3	3.8	Intel Graphics (4 Xe-cores)	?–2000	12 MB	15 W	57 W	January 2025

=== Based on the Lunar Lake microarchitecture ===
==== Lunar Lake ====
Processor branding	Model	P-core (performance)			E-core (efficiency)			Integrated GPU		Smart Cache	NPU		Integrated memory		TDP		Release date
Processor branding	Model	Cores (Threads)	Clock rate (GHz)		Cores (Threads)	Clock rate (GHz)		Model	Clock (MHz)	Smart Cache	Neural computes engines	NPU AI TOPS	Memory speed	Memory capacity	Base	Max. Turbo	Release date
Processor branding	Model	Cores (Threads)	Base	Turbo	Cores (Threads)	Base	Turbo	Model	Clock (MHz)	Smart Cache	Neural computes engines	NPU AI TOPS	Memory speed	Memory capacity	Base	Max. Turbo	Release date
Core Ultra 9	288V	4 (4)	3.3	5.1	4 (4)	3.3	3.7	Intel Arc 140V (8 Xe-cores)	?–2050	12 MB	6x Gen4	48	LPDDR5X; 8533 MT/s	32 GB	30 W (Min:17 W)	37 W	September 2024
Core Ultra 7	268V	4 (4)	2.2	5.0	4 (4)	2.2	3.7	Intel Arc 140V (8 Xe-cores)	?–2000	12 MB	6x Gen4	48	LPDDR5X; 8533 MT/s	32 GB	17 W (Min:8 W)	37 W	September 2024
Core Ultra 7	266V	4 (4)	2.2	5.0	4 (4)	2.2	3.7	Intel Arc 140V (8 Xe-cores)	?–2000	12 MB	6x Gen4	48	LPDDR5X; 8533 MT/s	16 GB	17 W (Min:8 W)	37 W	September 2024
Core Ultra 7	258V	4 (4)	2.2	4.8	4 (4)	2.2	3.7	Intel Arc 140V (8 Xe-cores)	?–1950	12 MB	6x Gen4	47	LPDDR5X; 8533 MT/s	32 GB	17 W (Min:8 W)	37 W	September 2024
Core Ultra 7	256V	4 (4)	2.2	4.8	4 (4)	2.2	3.7	Intel Arc 140V (8 Xe-cores)	?–1950	12 MB	6x Gen4	47	LPDDR5X; 8533 MT/s	16 GB	17 W (Min:8 W)	37 W	September 2024
Core Ultra 5	238V	4 (4)	2.1	4.7	4 (4)	2.1	3.5	Intel Arc 130V (7 Xe-cores)	?–1850	8 MB	5x Gen4	40	LPDDR5X; 8533 MT/s	32 GB	17 W (Min:8 W)	37 W	September 2024
Core Ultra 5	236V	4 (4)	2.1	4.7	4 (4)	2.1	3.5	Intel Arc 130V (7 Xe-cores)	?–1850	8 MB	5x Gen4	40	LPDDR5X; 8533 MT/s	16 GB	17 W (Min:8 W)	37 W	September 2024
Core Ultra 5	228V	4 (4)	2.1	4.5	4 (4)	2.1	3.5	Intel Arc 130V (7 Xe-cores)	?–1850	8 MB	5x Gen4	40	LPDDR5X; 8533 MT/s	32 GB	17 W (Min:8 W)	37 W	September 2024
Core Ultra 5	226V	4 (4)	2.1	4.5	4 (4)	2.1	3.5	Intel Arc 130V (7 Xe-cores)	?–1850	8 MB	5x Gen4	40	LPDDR5X; 8533 MT/s	16 GB	17 W (Min:8 W)	37 W	September 2024

=== Based on the Panther Lake microarchitecture ===
==== Panther Lake ====
Processor branding	Model	P-core (performance)			E-core (efficiency)			LPE-core (efficiency)			Integrated GPU		Smart Cache	NPU AI TOPS	Memory		TDP		Release date
Processor branding	Model	Cores (Threads)	Clock rate (GHz)		Cores (Threads)	Clock rate (GHz)		Cores (Threads)	Clock rate (GHz)		Model	Clock (MHz)	Smart Cache	NPU AI TOPS	Max. speed	Max. capacity	Base	Max. Turbo	Release date
Processor branding	Model	Cores (Threads)	Base	Turbo	Cores (Threads)	Base	Turbo	Cores (Threads)	Base	Turbo	Model	Clock (MHz)	Smart Cache	NPU AI TOPS	Max. speed	Max. capacity	Base	Max. Turbo	Release date
Core Ultra X9	388H	4 (4)	2.1	5.1	8 (8)	1.6	4.0	4 (4)	1.6	3.7	Intel Arc B390 (12 Xe-cores)	?–2500	18 MB	50	LPDDR5X 9600 MT/s	96 GB	25 W (Min:15 W)	80 W	January 2026
Core Ultra 9	386H	4 (4)	2.1	4.9	8 (8)	1.6	3.9	4 (4)	1.6	3.5	Intel Graphics (4 Xe-cores)	?–2500	18 MB	50	LPDDR5X-8533 MT/s; DDR5-7200 MT/s	96 GB; 128 GB	25 W (Min:15 W)	80 W	January 2026
Core Ultra X9	378H	4 (4)	2.0	5.0	8 (8)	1.6	3.8	4 (4)	1.6	3.6	Intel Arc B390 (12 Xe-cores)	?–2500	18 MB	50	LPDDR5X 9600 MT/s	96 GB	25 W (Min:15 W)	80 W	April 2026
Core Ultra X7	368H	4 (4)	2.0	5.0	8 (8)	1.6	4.0	4 (4)	1.6	3.6	Intel Arc B390 (12 Xe-cores)	?–2500	18 MB	50	LPDDR5X 9600 MT/s	96 GB	25 W (Min:15 W)	80 W	January 2026
Core Ultra 7	366H	4 (4)	2.0	4.8	8 (8)	1.6	3.8	4 (4)	1.6	3.4	Intel Graphics (4 Xe-cores)	?–2500	18 MB	50	LPDDR5X-8533 MT/s; DDR5-7200 MT/s	96 GB; 128 GB	25 W (Min:15 W)	80 W	January 2026
Core Ultra 7	365	4 (4)	2.4	4.8	—N/a			4 (4)	1.8	3.6	Intel Graphics (4 Xe-cores)	?–2500	12 MB	49	LPDDR5X-7467 MT/s; DDR5-6400 MT/s	96 GB; 128 GB	25 W (Min:12 W)	55 W	January 2026
Core Ultra X7	358H	4 (4)	1.9	4.8	8 (8)	1.5	3.7	4 (4)	1.5	3.3	Intel Arc B390 (12 Xe-cores)	?–2500	18 MB	50	LPDDR5X-9600 MT/s	96 GB	25 W (Min:15 W)	80 W	January 2026
Core Ultra 7	356H	4 (4)	1.9	4.7	8 (8)	1.5	3.7	4 (4)	1.5	3.3	Intel Graphics (4 Xe-cores)	?–2450	18 MB	50	LPDDR5X-8533 MT/s; DDR5-7200 MT/s	96 GB; 128 GB	25 W (Min:15 W)	80 W	January 2026
Core Ultra 7	355	4 (4)	2.3	4.7	—N/a			4 (4)	1.7	3.5	Intel Graphics (4 Xe-cores)	?–2500	12 MB	49	LPDDR5X-7467 MT/s; DDR5-6400 MT/s	96 GB; 128 GB	25 W (Min:12 W)	55 W	January 2026
Core Ultra 5	338H	4 (4)	1.9	4.7	4 (4)	1.5	3.6	4 (4)	1.5	3.3	Intel Arc B370 (10 Xe-cores)	?–2400	18 MB	47	LPDDR5X-8533 MT/s	96 GB	25 W (Min:15 W)	80 W	January 2026
Core Ultra 5	336H	4 (4)	1.9	4.6	4 (4)	1.5	3.6	4 (4)	1.5	3.2	Intel Graphics (4 Xe-cores)	?–2300	18 MB	47	LPDDR5X-8533 MT/s; DDR5-7200 MT/s	96 GB; 128 GB	25 W (Min:15 W)	80 W	January 2026
Core Ultra 5	335	4 (4)	2.2	4.6	—N/a			4 (4)	1.6	3.4	Intel Graphics (4 Xe-cores)	?–2450	12 MB	47	LPDDR5X-7467 MT/s; DDR5-6400 MT/s	96 GB; 128 GB	25 W (Min:12 W)	55 W	January 2026
Core Ultra 5	325	4 (4)	2.1	4.5	—N/a			4 (4)	1.6	3.4	Intel Graphics (4 Xe-cores)	?–2300	12 MB	47	LPDDR5X-7467 MT/s; DDR5-6400 MT/s	96 GB; 128 GB	25 W (Min:12 W)	55 W	January 2026
Core Ultra 5	332	2 (2)	2.5	4.4	—N/a			4 (4)	1.9	3.3	Intel Graphics (2 Xe-cores)	?–2450	12 MB	46	LPDDR5X-7467 MT/s; DDR5-6400 MT/s	96 GB; 128 GB	25 W (Min:12 W)	55 W	January 2026
Core Ultra 5	322	2 (2)	2.5	4.4	—N/a			4 (4)	1.9	3.3	Intel Graphics (2 Xe-cores)	?–2300	12 MB	46	LPDDR5X-7467 MT/s; DDR5-6400 MT/s	96 GB; 128 GB	25 W (Min:12 W)	55 W	January 2026

==== Wildcat Lake ====
Processor branding	Model	P-core (performance)			LPE-core (efficiency)			Integrated GPU		Smart Cache	NPU (TOPS)	TDP		Release date
Processor branding	Model	Cores (Threads)	Clock rate (GHz)		Cores (Threads)	Clock rate (GHz)		Model	Clock (MHz)	Smart Cache	NPU (TOPS)	Base	Max. Turbo	Release date
Processor branding	Model	Cores (Threads)	Base	Turbo	Cores (Threads)	Base	Turbo	Model	Clock (MHz)	Smart Cache	NPU (TOPS)	Base	Max. Turbo	Release date
Core 7	360	2 (2)	1.5	4.8	4 (4)	1.4	3.6	Intel Graphics (2 Xe-cores)	?–2600	6 MB	17	15 W	35 W	April 2026
Core 7	350	2 (2)	1.5	4.8	4 (4)	1.4	3.6	Intel Graphics (2 Xe-cores)	?–2600	6 MB	17	15 W	35 W	April 2026
Core 5	330	2 (2)	1.5	4.6	4 (4)	1.4	3.4	Intel Graphics (2 Xe-cores)	?–2500	6 MB	16	15 W	35 W	April 2026
Core 5	320	2 (2)	1.5	4.6	4 (4)	1.4	3.4	Intel Graphics (2 Xe-cores)	?–2500	6 MB	16	15 W	35 W	April 2026
Core 5	315	2 (2)	1.5	4.4	4 (4)	1.4	3.3	Intel Graphics (2 Xe-cores)	?-2300	6 MB	15	15 W	35 W	April 2026
Core 3	304	1(1)	1.5	4.3	4 (4)	1.4	3.3	Intel Graphics (1 Xe-cores)	?-2300	6 MB	15	15 W	35 W	April 2026

== See also ==
- List of Intel Core processors
- List of Intel Celeron processors
- List of Intel Pentium processors
- List of AMD mobile processors
- Ultra-low-voltage processor
