= HP Blackbird 002 =

Hewlett-Packard Company
- Company type: Public (NYSE: HPQ)
- Founded: Palo Alto, California (1939)
- Headquarters: Palo Alto, California, USA
- Website: www.hp.com www.hpshopping.com www.Compaq.com

VoodooPC
- Company type: Subsidiary of HP
- Founded: 1991
- Headquarters: Calgary, Alberta, Canada
- Products: Enthusiast Personal Computers
- Website: www.voodoopc.com

The HP Blackbird 002 was a gaming and high-performance PC built by HP’s Voodoo Business Unit. It launched in September 2007 and won over 10 Editor’s Choice awards, including one from C-NET which gave it a 9.3 out of 10. The chassis was made out of brushed aluminum and it sat on a cast aluminum foot. The elevation provided by the foot opened a sixth side for additional ventilation.

== History ==
The HP Blackbird 002 was originally a side project of an HP engineer named Tom Szolyga, who requisitioned components together to form a high-performance gaming system. At the time, HP had no immediate plans for the gaming PC business.

Szolyga mentioned his project to HP executives Phil McKinney, Todd Bradley, and Paul Campbell during a flight to San Diego for business meetings. The company planned to secure funding and a support team to further develop the system and eventually bring it to market.

The first iteration of the system was scrapped. The Compaq team in Houston, Texas acquired by HP helped create a new design. During this time, HP acquired VoodooPC. With additional input from VoodooPC founder Rahul Sood, the HP Blackbird 002 with Voodoo DNA was launched in September 2007.

The HP Blackbird 002 was replaced by the HP Firebird 803.

== Performance and design ==
The Blackbird 002 featured an all-aluminum chassis. Every unit was shipped configured to the individual’s preference, and with an open BIOS to allow for user-controlled overclocking.

The Blackbird had performance similar to the Falcon Northwest Mach V. "VoodooDNA" branding was visible inside the case. The original version featured an ASUS Striker Extreme 680i motherboard which supports Intel processors. It had four slots of DDR2 RAM, in basic configurations of 2 or 4 GB 1066 MHz. Another version featured an EVGA 780i SLI motherboard instead of the Asus Striker 680i.

The unit used Nvidia or ATI graphics cards, including Nvidia's SLI. Both Nvidia and ATI options were available with liquid cooling. The Blackbird 002 features flexible RAID capabilities, with five hard drive bays. The system also featured two multi-drives, with a single bay for a Blu-ray and HD DVD-ROM.

There were three basic cooling configurations: fan cooled, CPU liquid cooled, and both CPU and GPU liquid cooled.

== Aluminum chassis and foot ==
The system's wedge-shaped aluminum chassis and cast aluminum foot was capable of supporting up to 600 lbs. The wedge-shaped design and fins that lined the top and front of the chassis acted as a heat sink. The cast aluminum foot allowed airflow to pass under the HP Blackbird 002, for more efficient cooling to the 1.1 kW power supply seated at the base of the chassis.

The HP Blackbird 002 used liquid cooling to draw heat away from the CPU, motherboard, and GPUs. It was also designed with three thermal chambers that isolated key heat sources, which was designed to ensuring that cool air reached the main heat-generating components.

All of the internal components of the HP Blackbird 002 can be removed and installed without tools via a removable side panel which allows quick and easy access to the interior of the system.

== Reviews and awards ==
- C-NET Editors choice
- PC Magazine gave it a 5/5
- Computer Shopper gave it 8.5 out of 10
- Wired Magazine gave it "Best of Test"
- Maximum PC gave it 7 out of 10
- CPU Magazine gave it 4 out of 5
