= Voodoo Envy =

Voodoo Envy 133
- Developer: VoodooPC now Hewlett-Packard
- Type: Laptop or notebook
- Released: June 10, 2008
- Introductory price: USD$2,099
- Discontinued: October 15, 2009
- CPU: Intel Core 2 Duo 1.6 / 1.8 GHz
- Successor: HP Envy
- Website: Voodoo Envy 133

The Voodoo Envy 133 was a notebook computer designed by VoodooPC after its acquisition by Hewlett-Packard. It was positioned as a mobile ultraportable notebook and was introduced at HP's Connecting Your World Live event in Berlin, Germany on June 10, 2008.

== Overview ==
The chassis of the Voodoo Envy is made of carbon fiber, and it weighs 1.7 kg (3.75 lb) and is 1.8 cm (0.71 in) thick all around. The system utilizes the Windows Vista operating system as well as a Linux kernel dubbed "Voodoo Instant On" or "Voodoo IOS." The laptop has often been compared to the MacBook Air for its similar size and specifications. HP claimed it to be the world's thinnest notebook, although this record has now been broken, as it is 0.70 inches throughout, whereas the Dell Adamo is 0.65 inches thick all around.

According to the specifications, its 3-cell lithium-ion battery will provide up to 3 hours and 10 minutes' battery life, depending on usage.

The HP Envy line of laptops and other products replaced the Voodoo Envy when HP and VoodooPC merged.
