= Unikrn =

American esports and media company

Unikrn Inc.
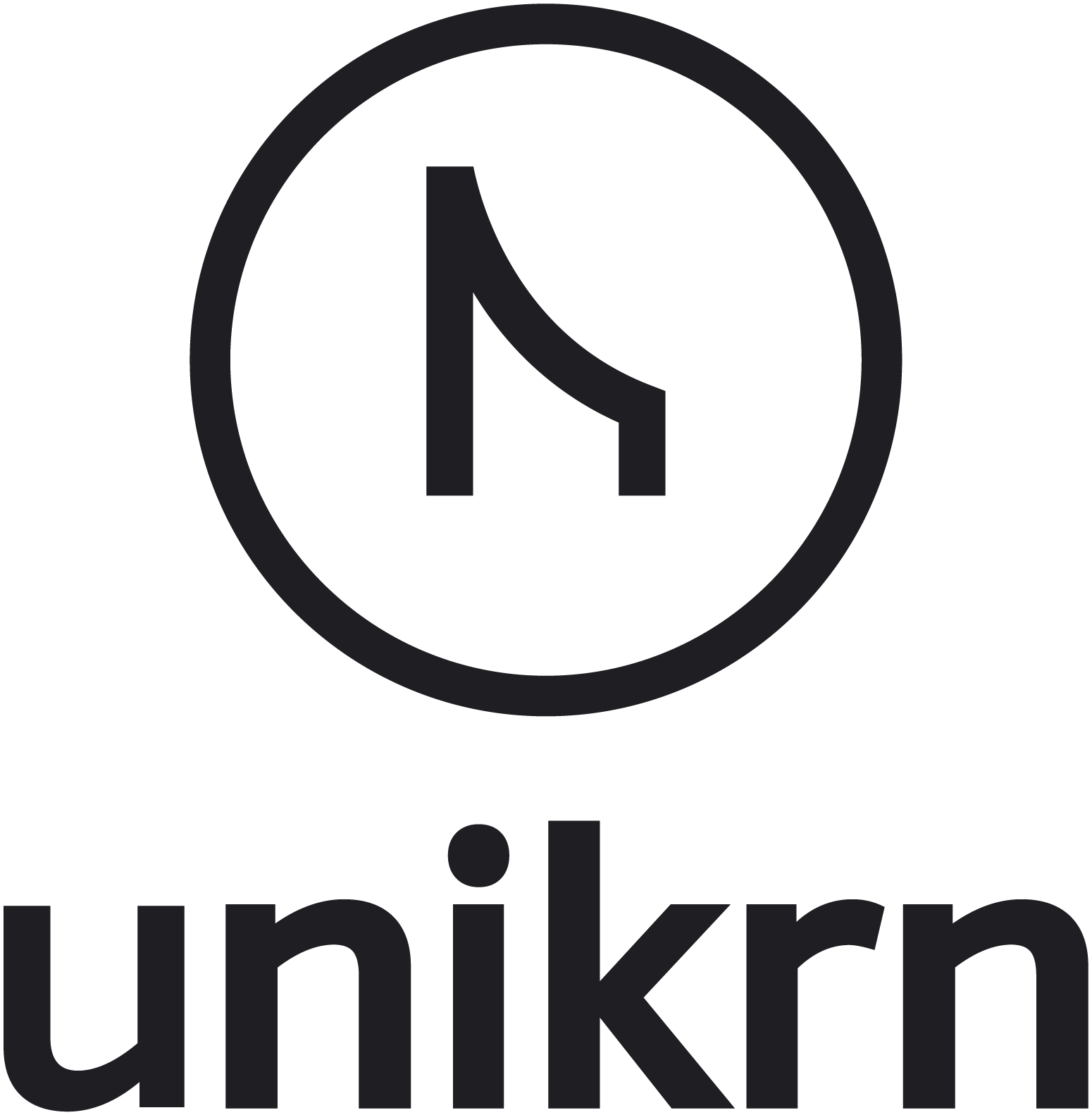
- Website type: Corporation
- Founded: 2014
- Headquarters: Miami, United States
- Area served: Worldwide
- Founders: Rahul Sood, Karl Flores
- Industry: Online gambling
- Services: Online Esports betting & gaming
- Website: unikrn.com

Unikrn Inc. (styled as "Unikrn") is an esports betting and entertainment media company based in Miami, Florida.

In August 2021, international betting, gambling and interactive entertainment company Entain acquired Unikrn.

== Overview ==
Founded in November 2014, Unikrn primarily offers real money and token-based wagering on competitive video game tournaments, otherwise known as esports. Unikrn creates betting markets on esports (organized video game competitions) matches akin to traditional betting.

== History ==
The company was founded by Rahul Sood and Karl Flores in November 2014.

In 2016, Unikrn became an investor in BIG (Berlin International Gaming), a professional Counter-Strike: Global Offensive team. Unikrn also has an investment in MAINGEAR, a high-end PC manufacturer.

In the second quarter of 2017, Unikrn acquired LEET, an esports startup based in Las Vegas, Nevada. Unikrn also owns an Indian-based esports company, DotaProHub.

In November 2017, the company released UnikoinGold, an ERC-20 cryptocurrency, running on the Ethereum blockchain.

In September 2020, Unikrn agreed to a settlement with the U.S. Securities and Exchange Commission after raising $31 million via a digital asset called UnikoinGold in an unregistered 2019 token sale of digital. Unikrn volunteered to settle without a determination of guilt by paying a $6.1 million penalty to be paid via a Fair Fund to its token holders. Unikrn also undertook to disable UnikoinGold Unikrn settled despite lack of consensus within the SEC that Unikoingold constituted a security, with Commissioner Hester M. Peirce saying, "I do not concur in my colleagues’ opinion that Unikrn’s token offering constituted a securities offering[...] By failing to challenge ourselves to experiment with new approaches to regulation, we, and those whose interests we are pledged to serve, risk surrendering the fruits of innovation. I respectfully dissent from the Commission’s actions today relating to Unikrn." She further clarified, "[Unikrn] is not alleged to have engaged in any fraud."
