= HP Envy =

Semi-discontinued line of high-end laptops and desktops, and line of printers from HP

- Developer: Hewlett-Packard (1995–2015); HP Inc. (2015–2026)
- Manufacturer: Hewlett-Packard (1995–2015); HP Inc. (2015–2026)
- Type: Personal computers, printers
- Released: October 15, 2009; 17 years ago
- Lifespan: 2009–2025 (laptops); 2009–2026 (desktops, printers)
- Discontinued: 2025 (laptops); 2026 (desktops)
- Operating system: Windows, Linux
- CPU: AMD, Intel
- Graphics: AMD, Nvidia
- Marketing target: Consumer
- Predecessor: Voodoo Envy
- Successor: HP OmniDesk; HP OmniStudio; HP OmniBook 7 HP OmniBook X
- Related: HP Essential, HP Pavilion, HP Spectre, HP TouchSmart
- Website: HP ENVY - desktops HP ENVY - laptops HP ENVY - printers

The HP Envy (stylized in all uppercase) is a discontinued line of consumer-oriented high-end laptops and desktop computers, as well as a not-discontinued line of printers manufactured and sold since 2009 by Hewlett-Packard and later by its successor, HP Inc. It originally started as a high-end version of the HP Pavilion line before becoming its own separate line years later.

The Envy line of computers is currently being supplanted by the AI-powered Omni brand (OmniBook, OmniStudio, OmniDesk) due to a corporate streamlining of products that happened in 2024. The Envy line of printers continues to be produced.

== History ==
HP originally launched the Envy lineup on October 15, 2009, with two high-performance models, the Envy 13 and the Envy 15. These models replaced the Voodoo Envy when HP and VoodooPC merged in 2006. After that, HP expanded the series with the addition of the Envy 14 and Envy 17 models. The Envy's main competition were computers such as Acer's Aspire and Swift, Asus's VivoBook and ZenBook, Dell's Inspiron and XPS, Lenovo's IdeaPad and Yoga, Samsung's Galaxy Book, and Toshiba's Satellite.

In 2010, HP released only the Envy 14 and 17 model; the Envy 13 model quietly being discontinued.

In 2012, HP discontinued their traditional Envy 13, 14, 15, and 17 models and rebranded their existing Pavilion line of computers as the new Envy lineup. The new Envy line consisted of the (rebranded Pavilion) Envy notebook line and the hybrid HP Envy x2. The rebranded Pavilion laptops continued with Beats Audio branded speakers and dedicated Nvidia graphics processors.

In 2013, there were three Ultrabooks in the Envy lineup – the Envy 4 TouchSmart, Envy 4, and Envy 6.

In 2014, the naming changed again, and Envy laptops had a 13, 14, 15, and 17 model. The Envy brand was also expanded to include desktops and printers under the brand name.

In May 2024, HP announced its plans on restructuring their consumer-oriented brands for their computers, with the Pavilion, Envy and Spectre brands (except for Omen) being succeeded by the OmniBook, OmniStudio and OmniDesk brands as part of the new Omni brand. This change also marked the return of HP's formerly defunct OmniBook brand after its initial discontinuation in 2002 following the acquisition of Compaq that year. The Omni brand would consist of computers utilizing next-generation AI technologies. As of 2025, the Envy laptops are currently being supplanted by the OmniBook 7 and X series as part of the brand streamlining, while the Envy desktops and printers continued to be produced for at least four months until the end of August 2026 when the printers were discontinued and the desktops replaced by the OmniDesk and OmniStudio series, ending production of all computers in the Envy lineup after 31 years.

== Notebook models ==
=== Latest models ===
==== Envy x2 ====
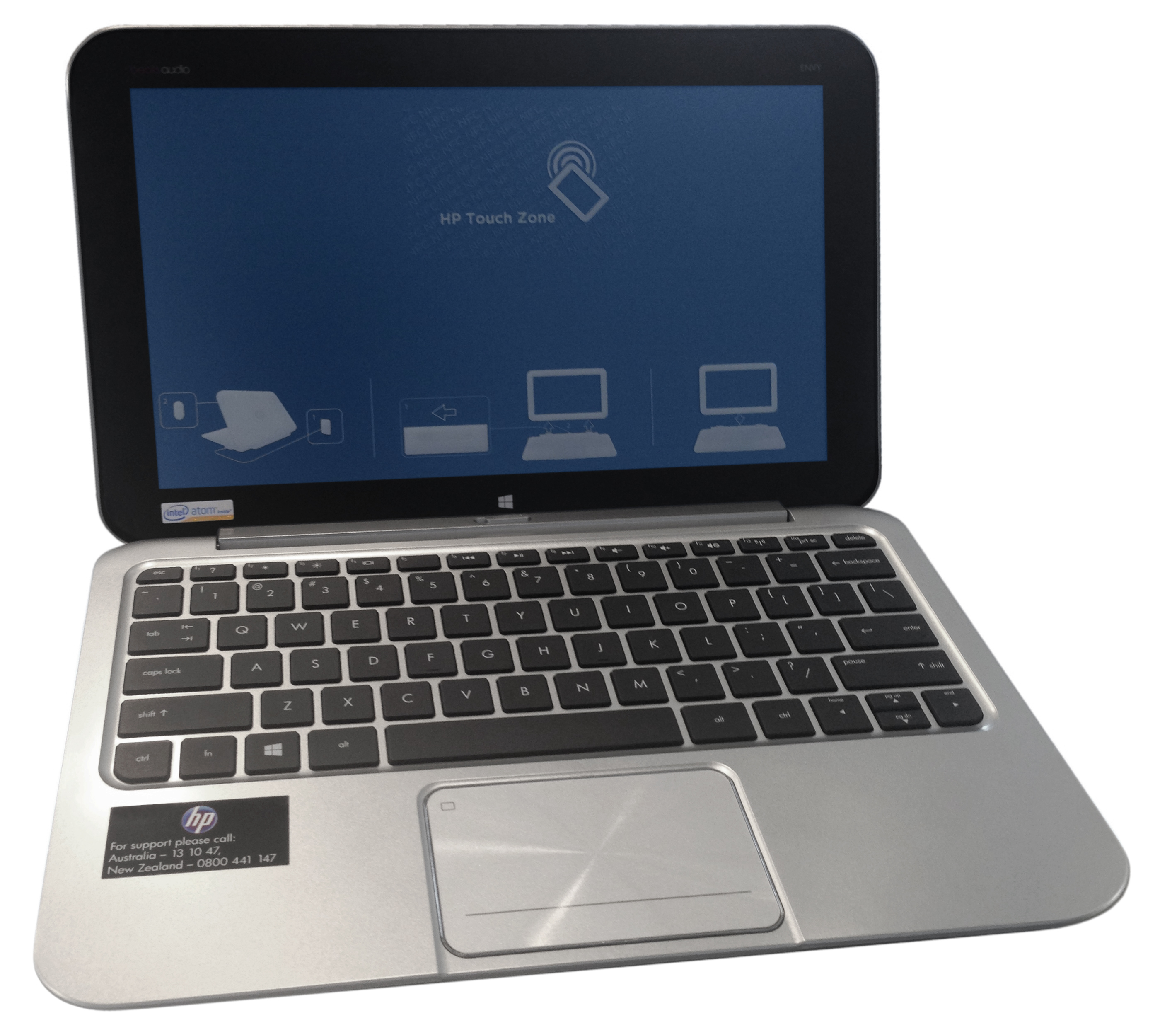
Envy X2 (2012) laptop

The HP Envy x2 refers to two generations of 2-in-1 PCs.

- The first-generation Envy x2, introduced in 2012, is a compact laptop-tablet hybrid. It consists of a detachable 11.6-inch screen with a 1366 × 768 resolution and active stylus support, together with a keyboard dock equipped with two USB 2.0 ports, a full-size HDMI connector, and a standard SD card slot. The device originally ran Windows 8 on a 1.8 GHz Intel Atom Z2760 processor. It is upgradable to Windows 10 Home, but Microsoft does not support the latest Windows features in the Creators Update due to incompatibility. It will, however, continue receiving security and reliability updates until 2023.
- The second generation Envy x2 was announced in 2017, and is a Windows 10-powered hybrid tablet with a 12.3-inch 1920 × 1280 display, an included active stylus, and a detachable keyboard attachment similar to Microsoft's Surface Pro. Touting 20 hours of battery life on a single charge and 4G LTE network capability, there are two processor and operating system options: the ARM-based Snapdragon 835 from Qualcomm with Windows 10 S (and the ability to upgrade to Windows 10 Pro), and seventh-generation Intel Core i-series processors with Windows 10 Home. Physical connectivity on both versions is limited to a single USB-C 3.1 port and a microSD card reader.

==== Envy 13 ====
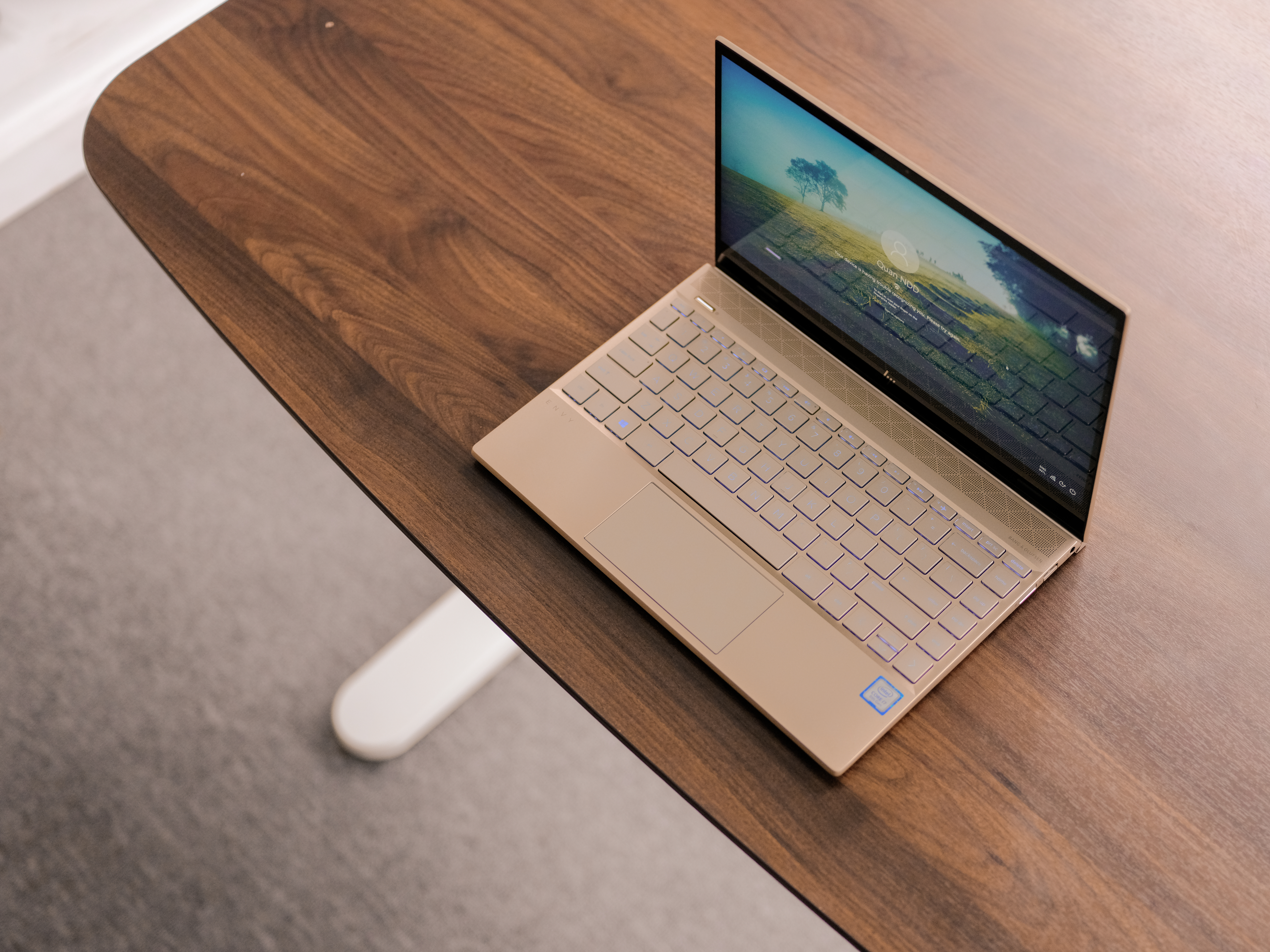
Envy 13 (2018) laptop

The Envy 13 from 2009 uses a mobile 1.86 GHz CULV Core 2 Duo processor with 3 GB of DDR3 memory and the entry-level ATI Radeon Mobility 4330 graphics. The Envy 13 has a 13.1-inch HP LED Ultra BrightView Infinity display with a 1366 × 768 resolution. Available as an upgrade was the HP Radiance Infinity Display with a 1600 × 900 resolution.

The 2017 model uses an 8th generation Intel Core i7-8565U chip, 16GB of DDR4 RAM, NVIDIA GeForce MX250 dedicated graphics card, and a 512GB SSD. It also has an aluminum chassis.

The 2020 model uses a 13.3-inch FHD display, 10th generation Intel Core CPU, 8 GB RAM, and a 512GB SSD. It weighs 1.3 kg. and measures 307 x 195 x 16.9 mm.

==== Envy 14 ====
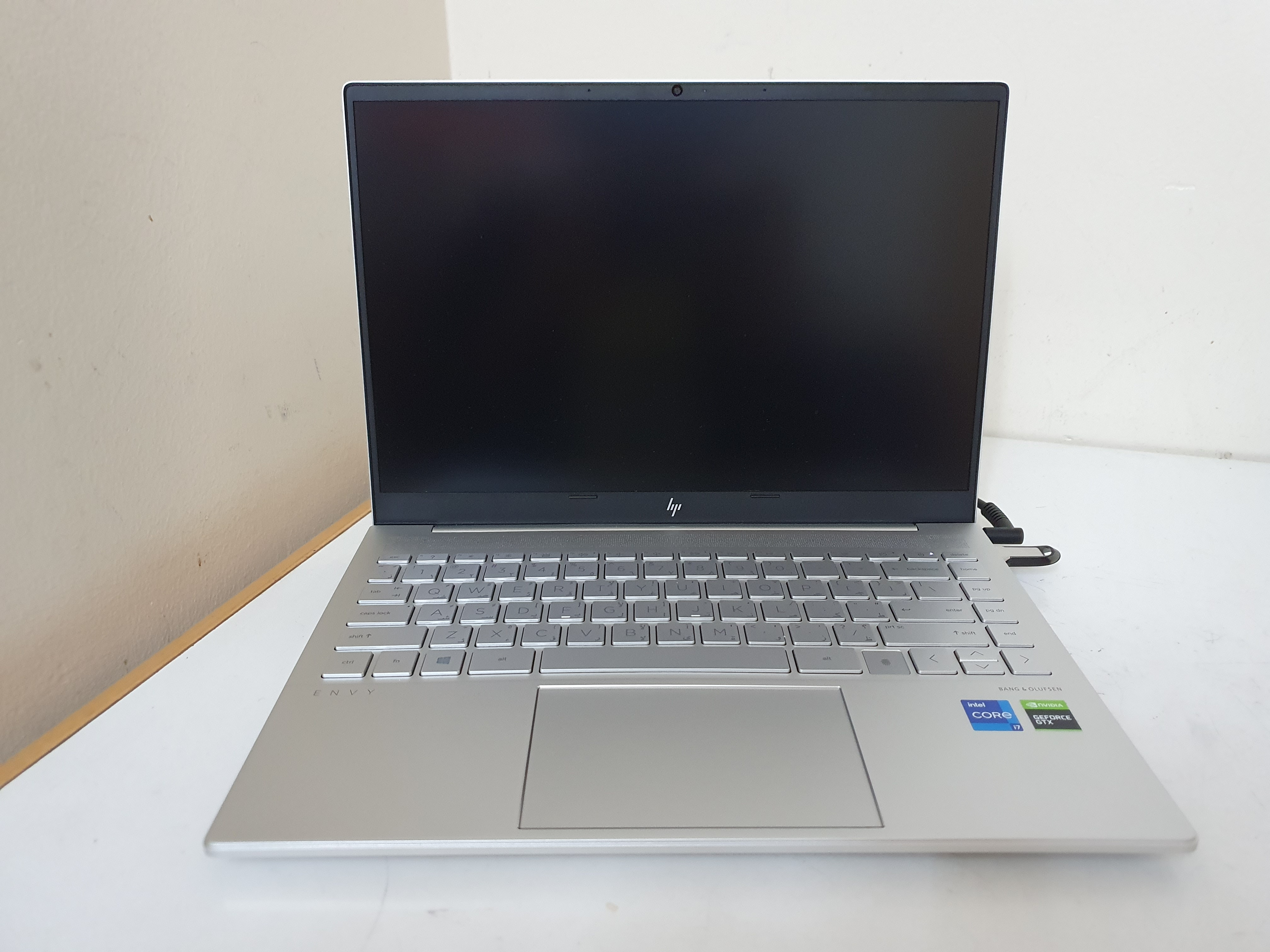
A 2021 silver HP ENVY 14 eb0001nx laptop

The 2010 Envy 14 has a 14.5-inch HP BrightView Infinity LED display at a 1600 × 900 resolution. It is powered by Intel's Core series of processors and a mid-level ATI Radeon Mobility 5650. The dynamic swapping GPUs are useful in gaming or graphically demanding programs. The 14 also provides longer battery life with an 8 cell Li-Ion battery. Unlike the 13 and 15 models, the Envy 14 also comes with a backlit keyboard, a standard Intel Wireless-N Card with Bluetooth and a slot-loading DVD±RW drive. The Envy 14 also comes in a special Beats edition, which is in an all-black design with a red back-lit keyboard.

In mid-2011, HP released the 2nd Gen Envy 14, and the basic configuration comes with a 2nd Gen Intel Core i5 @ 2.4 GHz and is upgradable up to the quad-core i7 @ 2.3 GHz. Standard configurations come with 6 GB DDR3 RAM installed, but the system can handle up to 16 GB (2 slots) of RAM. The same backlit keyboard and 8-cell battery comes standard on all laptops, along with the same 8× slot-loading DVD-R/RW drive. The GPU is upgraded to the dual Intel GMA 3000 and AMD Radeon HD 6630M, although the screen resolution was reduced to a more entry-grade resolution of 1366 × 768.

==== HP Envy x360 ====
Overview of Envy x360 models in chronological order
Model	15-eu1000	15-ey0000	15-ew0000	15-es2000	15-ey1000	15-fh0000	15-fe0000	15-ew1000	15-fe1000	16-ac0000	16-ad0000
Released	2022				2023				2024		
CPU series	Ryzen 5000		Intel Core 12th		Ryzen 7000		Intel Core 13th		Intel Core Ultra 100		Ryzen 8000
Chipset	AMD Integrated SoC		Intel Integrated SoC		AMD Integrated SoC		Intel Integrated SoC				AMD Integrated SoC
Display size	15.6"									16"	
Graphics	AMD Radeon		Intel Iris X^{e} or NVIDIA GeForce RTX 2050 4 GB GDDR6								
Memory	8 GB DDR4-3200 MHz RAM (2 x 4 GB); 16 GB DDR4-3200 MHz RAM (2 x 8 GB)										
Storage	256/512 GB/ 1TB PCIe Gen 3.0 NVMe Value M.2 SSD										
Networking											
Audio	Audio by Bang & Olufsen (audio control panel) with dual speakers										
Battery											
Operating system											

The HP Envy x360 are convertible PCs that have a 360-degree hinge.

The first-generation Envy x360 was released in 2014 with a 15.6-inch IPS full HD display, 8 GB memory, 1 TB storage, 4th generation Intel Core, and either AMD Radeon or Nvidia GeForce graphics. The next year, an updated version was released running on Broadwell (5th generation Intel Core) CPUs.

In 2016, a new Envy x360 model was released, which ran on Skylake (6th generation Intel Core). The 2017 models came with optional AMD A9, A12, and FX processors. The 2018 models also featured a 13-inch Envy x360 for the first time. The latest HP Envy x360 is the 2023 model, which is also "IMAX Enhanced certified".

==== Envy 15 ====
The Envy 15 uses mobile Intel Core i7 and Core i5 processors (4 and 2 cores respectively) and can hold a maximum of 16 GB of RAM housed in 4 DIMM slots (2 of which are user accessible). The 15 makes use of the 40 nm ATI Mobility Radeon HD 5830 with 1 GB of dedicated graphics memory. The 15 ships with a 15.6-inch HP LED display with 1366 × 768 (TN) or 1920 × 1080 (IPS) resolution.

The webcam on the Envy 15 is night-vision capable with infra-red sensor. The Envy 15 is designed to house a single 2.5-inch Serial ATA drive, or two 1.8-inch SATA drives, with two 160 GB solid state drives configuration available. New generation of HP Envy m6 model, called as HP ENVY m6-1225dx release in January 2013. This model had a 2.6 GHz Intel Core i5-3230M Dual Core processor (up to 3.2 GHz via Turbo Boost) and Microsoft Windows 8.

The 15.6-inch Full HD "Radiance" display panel which was sold with this laptop has an issue in which the color red displays closer to orange. In response, HP had issued a software utility called MyDisplay, but does not appear to completely correct the problem with some users saying all it does is mask a problem which is actually hardware based and not software.

Starting May 2013, HP has released its new line of HP Envy laptops that come with the 4th generation Haswell Core i7 processors. These laptops come with an optional upgrade to Nvidia GT 740M graphic cards with 2 GB of dedicated graphics memory. Whether HP uses the GK107 or GK208 variant in the 740M is undisclosed. The laptops also offer a hybrid 1 TB hard drive.

==== Envy 17 ====
The 2010s Envy 17 comes with a Blu-ray option, and, similar to the Envy 14, is equipped with a backlit keyboard. It has also an optional 1920 × 1080 display resolution, option for dual hard-disk or SSD and Supports Eyefinity by which it can be connected to 3 displays via VGA, Mini DisplayPort, and HDMI out supported by ATI 5850 GDDR5 Graphics.

Envy 17 3D
The Envy 17 comes with all basic features of Envy 17 plus a 3D 1920 × 1080 display and HP 3D glasses. The 2020s Envy 17 has a 10gen or 11gen Intel Core CPU and up to GeForce MX330 graphics.

=== Discontinued models ===
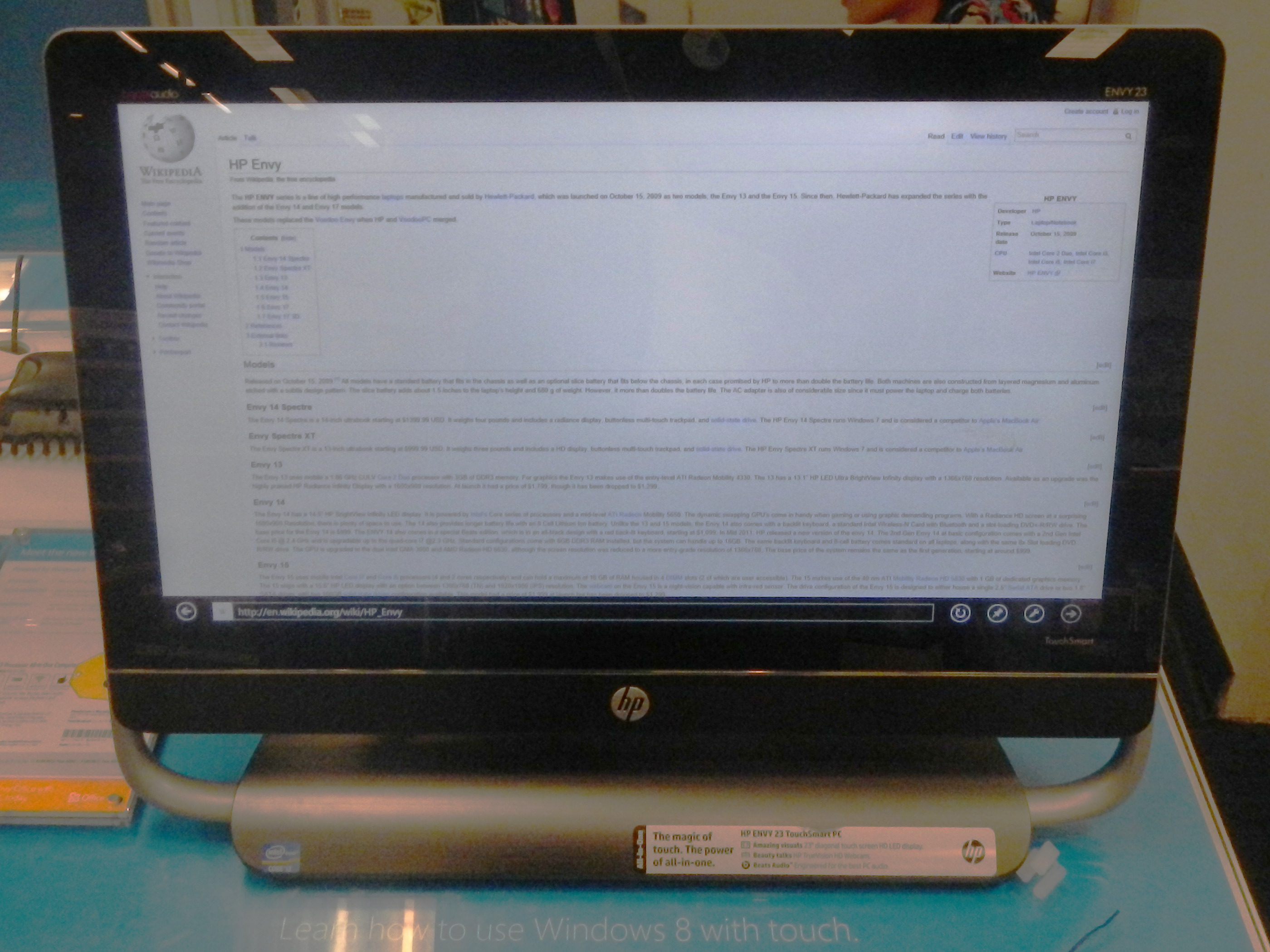
HP ENVY/TouchSmart

As of October 2012, the Envy 13, 14, 15, and 17 have been temporarily discontinued. The first of these models was originally released on October 15, 2009. All models have a standard battery that fits in the chassis as well as an optional slice battery that fits below the chassis, in each case promised by HP to more than double the battery life. Both machines are also constructed from layered magnesium and aluminum etched with a subtle design pattern. The slice battery adds about 1.5 inches to the laptop's height and 680 g of mass. However, it more than doubles the battery life. The AC adapter is also of considerable size since it must power the laptop and charge both batteries.

==== Envy Dv6 ====
The Envy Dv6 is a 15.6-inch laptop that resembles the previous Pavilion dv6 and is replacement to the successful HP Envy 15. It weighs about 5 lb (2.3 kg), has a mostly aluminum chassis and can be customized to accommodate a 1080p matte display, multi-touch touchpad, and up to 1.5 TB HDD. The HP Envy Dv6 runs Windows 8 and can be configured to have an Up to Nvidia GTX 650M graphics, backlit keyboard and comes with Beats audio. There are two main variants of the Dv6, the Dv6 comes with AMD processors while the Dv6t come with Intel Core i7 Mobile processors.

In November 2015, HP released a new Envy Dv6. It accommodates a FHD display and 1.5 TB HDD. The new Dv6 comes with Windows 10 and can be configured with up to an Intel Core i7 processor, Nvidia GeForce GT900M graphics and a "lifted" hinge design. It also comes with B&O Play.

==== Envy Dv7 ====
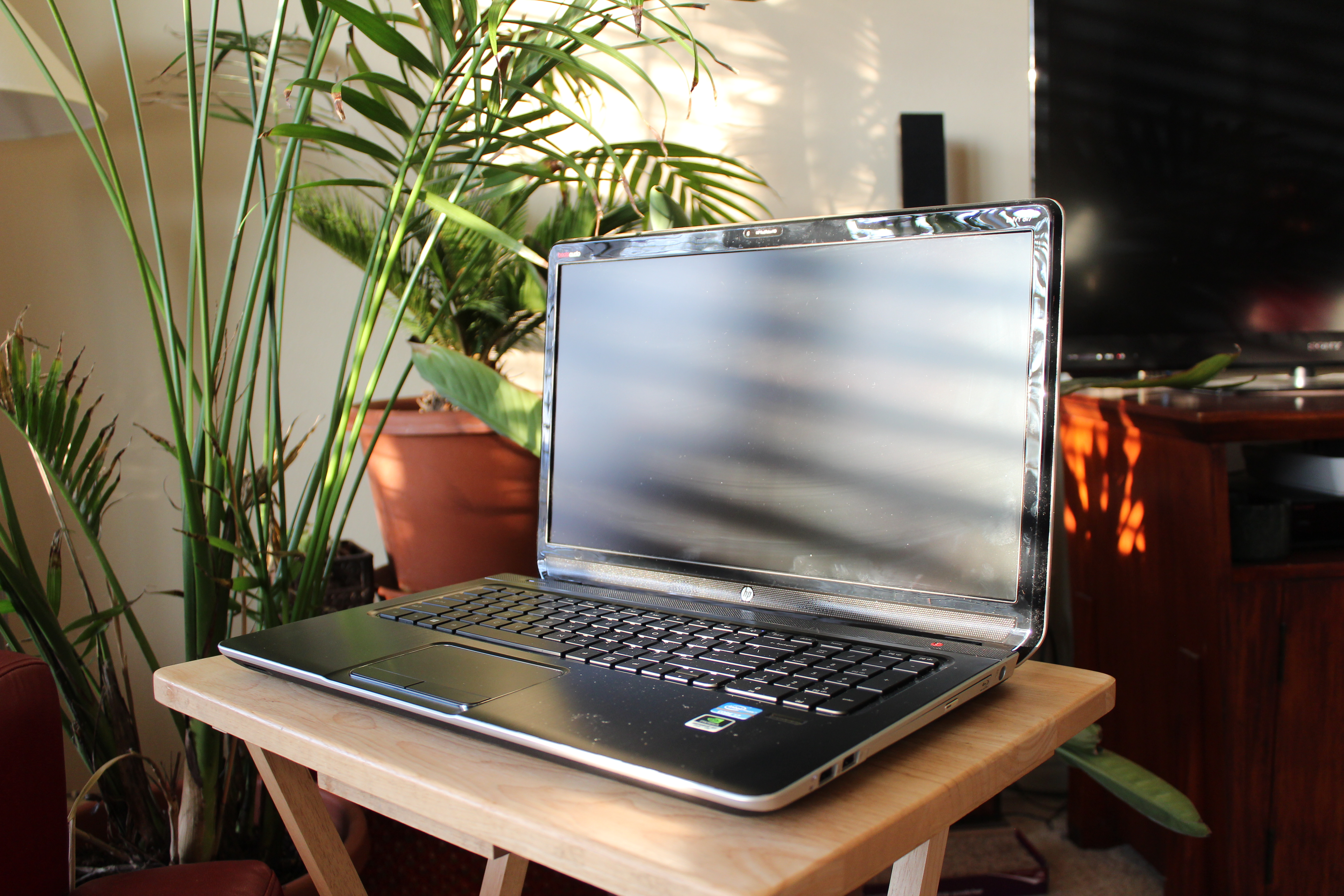
HP Envy dv7t-7200

For 2013, the series are now named Envy 17t. Intel Haswell (Lynx Point) processors are offered with Intel HD 4600 graphics, and optional Nvidia GT 740M graphics along with Blu-ray optical drives.

The Envy Dv7 is a high-end 17.3-inch laptop that resembles the previous Pavilion Dv7. It weighs about 6 pounds (2.7 kg), can be customized to accommodate a matte 1920 × 1080 TN LCD, comes with a multitouch touchpad, and can hold two hard drives (up to 1 TB each). The HP Envy Dv7 runs Windows 8 and is replacement to the successful HP Envy 17. The Dv7 can be configured to have an Intel Core i7 Mobile processor, up to Nvidia GT 650M graphics and a backlit keyboard. The Dv7 comes with Beats Audio and has an aluminum chassis. There are two main variants of the Dv7, the Dv7z has AMD processors while the Dv7t has more powerful Intel processors.

==== Envy 14 Spectre ====
The Envy 14 Spectre is a 14-inch ultrabook. It weighs four pounds and includes a radiance display, a gorilla glass screen and palm rest, a buttonless multi-touch touchpad, an NFC chip and solid-state drive. The HP Envy 14 Spectre runs Windows 7. The Envy 14 Spectre was removed from HP's 2013 Envy lineup as the Spectre line was spun off from it.

==== Envy Spectre XT ====
The Envy Spectre XT is a 13-inch ultrabook released in 2012 and removed from HP's 2013 Envy line-up. It weighs 3 pounds (1.4 kg) and includes a 1366 × 768 display, buttonless multi-touch touchpad, and solid-state drive. The HP Envy Spectre XT runs Windows 7.

Envy Spectre XT Pro
Same model with Tpm module and Windows 7 Pro.

== Desktop models ==
There have been several series of Envy desktops, including Envy H8, Envy 700, Envy H9, Envy Phoenix 800, Envy Phoenix 860 and Envy Phoenix H9. A wide variety of features differentiate the individual models. As a result, they range from mainstream through gamer-oriented.

=== All-in-one desktop models ===
This line includes the ENVY 32, ENVY 34 Curved and ENVY 27 all-in-one PCs.

== Recalls ==
Some HP laptops, including several HP Envy laptops, were recalled due to containing defective batteries. In 2019, HP encouraged their customers to check if their battery was malfunctioning and, if so, to get a refund, saying, "HP urges customers to recheck all potentially affected products." The HP ENVY laptops entitled to a recall are:

- HP ENVY m6
- HP ENVY 15

== Printers ==
Beginning in 2013, over 50 models of all-in-one printers within the Envy brand were produced, including the Envy 100, Envy 110, Envy 120, Envy 4500, Envy 4520, and Envy 5530 printers.
