= Maingear =

MAINGEAR, Inc.
- Type: Privately owned
- Industry: Computer hardware, consumer electronics, digital distribution
- Founded: September 2002
- Founder: Wallace Santos
- Headquarters: Warren, New Jersey
- Area served: Worldwide
- Key people: Wallace Santos (CEO); Shroud (co-owner)
- Products: Desktops; Laptops; Gaming computers Workstations; Gaming chair
- Number of employees: 30 (2016)
- Website: www.maingear.com

Maingear (stylized as MAINGEAR) is an American privately held boutique computer manufacturer headquartered in Warren, New Jersey. The company builds, designs, specializes, and supports custom high-performance desktops, gaming computers, customizable laptops, and workstations in the United States. It was founded in 2002 by Wallace Santos. Since 2022, the streamer Shroud has been a co-owner of the company.

== History ==
=== Founding and early years ===
Maingear was founded by Wallace Santos in September 2002. Santos, who had struggled to find employment at 18 because of his age, initially ran a network consulting business, but shifted to building gaming computers after friends and family asked him to assemble systems for them; the business was renamed Maingear during the 2002 holiday season. According to TechRadar, the company gained early recognition through an appearance at the Consumer Electronics Show and an endorsement from technology broadcaster Leo Laporte.

In 2009, Maingear offered systems with support for Nvidia 3D Vision stereoscopic glasses, including the Prelude 2 desktop and the small-form-factor X-Cube 3D. The company was ranked No. 848 on the Inc. 5000 list of fast-growing private companies in 2012, and No. 2,374 in 2022.

=== Growth and crowdfunding ===
By 2016, Maingear was based in Kenilworth, New Jersey, and had 30 employees. According to an offering statement filed with the U.S. Securities and Exchange Commission in 2018, the company's revenue grew from $6.4 million in 2015 to $7.9 million in 2016. In 2018, Maingear raised capital through an equity crowdfunding campaign on the Netcapital platform at a valuation of $24.7 million; investors included the musician deadmau5. Santos said he had chosen crowdfunding over venture capital to preserve the company's independence.

A 2019 TechRadar report on the company's New Jersey facility described hand assembly of systems at dedicated build stations and an in-house automotive-grade paint shop staffed by former car painters, used for custom chassis finishes.

=== Shroud co-ownership ===
In November 2022, the Twitch streamer and former professional player Michael "Shroud" Grzesiek became a co-owner and advisor of Maingear. The announcement coincided with the launch of the MG-1 desktop line, including an MG-1 Shroud Edition, and a rebranding of the company with a new logo and a color scheme based on Shroud's signature light blue.

== Products ==
=== Desktops ===
The Shift, a full-tower desktop, uses a chassis in which the motherboard is rotated 90 degrees, so that external ports face the top of the case and heat from the graphics cards is exhausted vertically.

In 2020, the company released the Turbo, a Mini-ITX desktop with Maingear's custom Apex liquid-cooling system. PC Gamer gave it a score of 91/100, describing it as "a ridiculously expensive (and gorgeous) liquid cooled gaming PC".

The MG-1, launched in November 2022 at a starting price of $1,449, featured magnetic, interchangeable front panels that could carry custom artwork. Tom's Hardware gave the MG-1 Silver (Shroud Edition) its Editor's Choice award in 2023.

At CES 2025, Maingear introduced the Apex Force and Apex Rush, custom water-cooled desktops; the Apex Force uses separate cooling loops for the CPU and GPU with two 420 mm radiators.

=== Laptops ===
In September 2019, Maingear launched the Element, a 15.6-inch gaming laptop with a magnesium-alloy chassis; a limited Launch Edition of 50 units was priced at $2,199. The company's later ML-16 laptop received a "Recommended" rating from Tom's Guide in 2024.

=== Workstations ===
In March 2024, Maingear and Phison introduced the PRO AI line of workstations, which use Phison's aiDAPTIV+ SSD caching technology to train large language models on local hardware. The three preconfigured models, based on an Intel Xeon W7-3455 processor with up to four Nvidia RTX 6000 Ada GPUs, were priced from $28,000 to $60,000.

== Partnerships ==
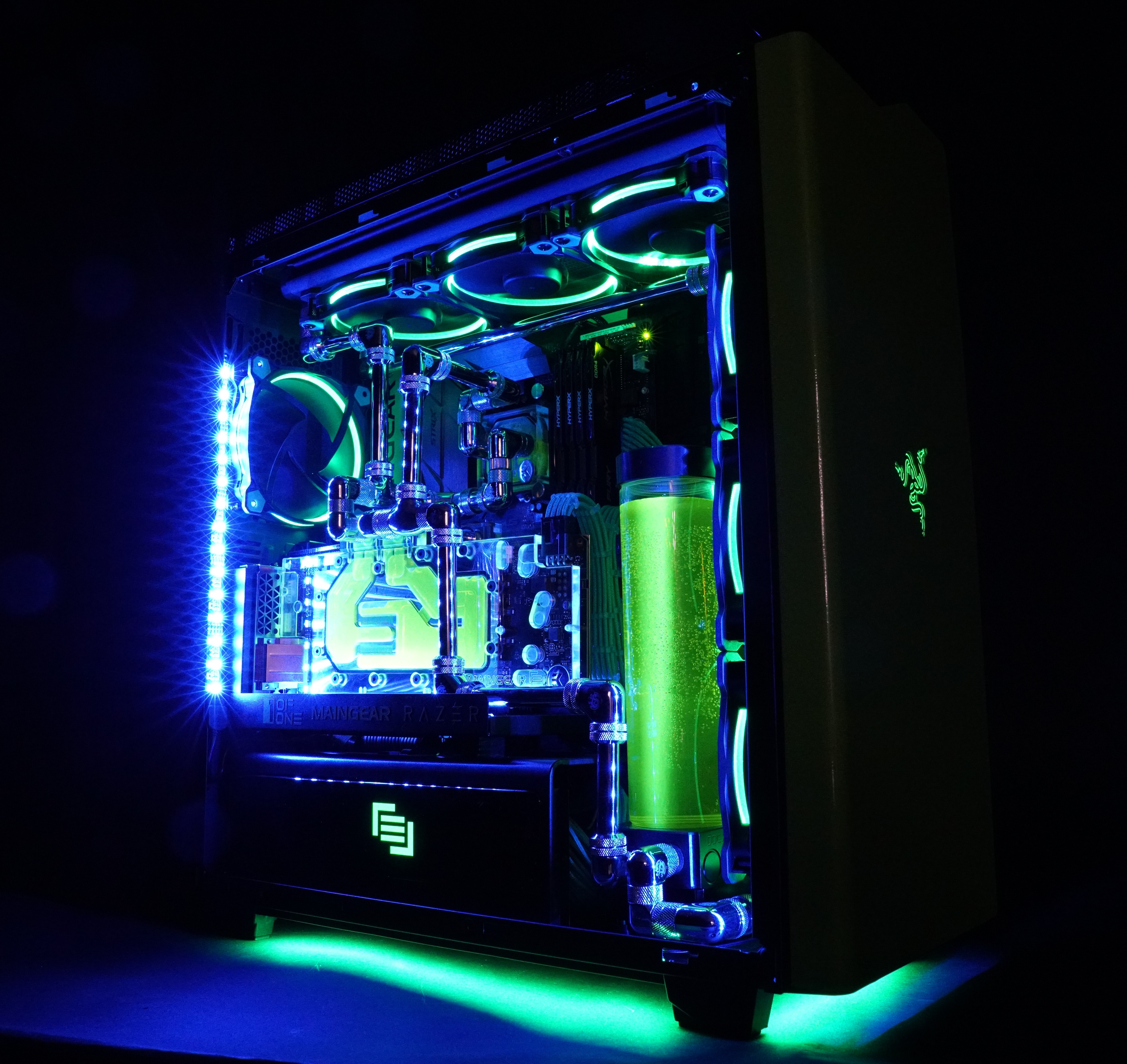
MAINGEAR's R1 "1-of-ONE" edition.

In 2016, Razer Inc. collaborated with Maingear to release the R1 Razer Edition. Coca-Cola also partnered with Maingear on branded esports computers, which used Coca-Cola-branded cooling liquid.

In 2016, the company partnered with HP Inc. to release a custom-tuned version of its Omen X.

In 2018, the esports betting platform Unikrn announced it would work with Maingear to produce UKG crypto-mining PCs.
