= Acer Aspire =

Series of Acer PCs

- Developer: Acer
- Type: Laptop, All-in-one, Desktop
- Released: September 1995; 31 years ago
- Operating system: Windows, Linux
- CPU: AMD, Intel
- Graphics: AMD, Nvidia, Intel
- Power: Battery or AC
- Marketing target: Consumer
- Related: Acer Swift

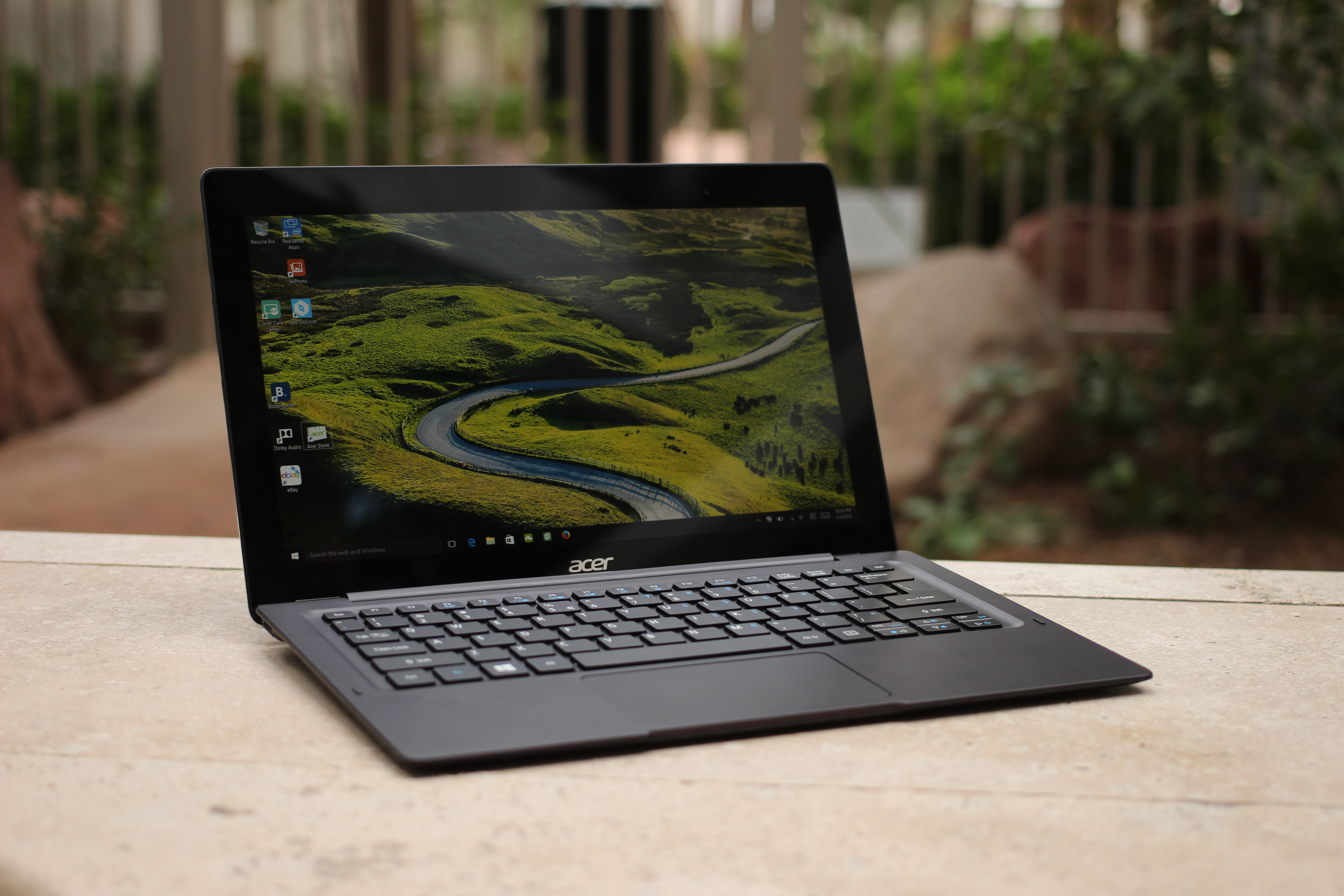
Acer Aspire Switch 12 S

Acer Aspire (stylised as Λspire or ΛSPIRE) is a series of consumer-oriented personal computers by Acer Inc. The Aspire series covers both desktop computers and laptops. Acer developed the series to range from essentials to high-performance. The Aspire mainly competes against computers such as Asus's VivoBook and ZenBook, Dell's Inspiron and XPS, HP's Pavilion, Spectre, Essential and Envy, Lenovo's IdeaPad and Yoga, Samsung's Galaxy Book, and Toshiba's Satellite. It formerly competed against computers such as Asus's Transformer Book Flip and HP's Stream.

The Aspire series was first brought to the market in September 1995, which featured the Intel Pentium processor. The Aspire series then replaced the AcerPower series in 2002 and became one of Acer's main series.

== Switch tablets ==
Acer Aspire Switch was a series of two-in-one tablet computers running Windows 8 and Windows 10, with a tablet and detachable keyboard sold together, the Switch lineup was discontinued around 2021.

=== List of Acer Aspire Switch models ===
- SW3-013
- SW3-013P
- SW3-016
- SW3-016P
- SW5-011
- SW5-012
- SW5-012P
- SW5-014
- SW5-014P
- SW5-015
- SW5-111
- SW5-111P
- SW5-171
- SW5-171P
- SW5-173
- SW5-173P
- SW5-271
- SW7-272
- SW7-272P

=== Switch 10 ===
Acer Aspire Switch 10 was announced in April 2014. It is a 10.1-inch two-in-one, with a 1366 × 768 resolution display and Intel Atom Z3745 processor. A second-generation Acer Aspire Switch 10 was then launched in October 2014 It was given a different display resolution of 1280 × 800, and a different Intel Atom Z3735F processor.

=== Switch 11 ===
Acer Aspire Switch 11 was announced in September 2014, as a larger 11.6-inch version, that was planned for release in November. There are two models of the Acer Aspire Switch 11: The Acer Aspire Switch 11 SW5-111 with an Intel Atom Z3735 processor, 2 GB RAM, and a 1366 × 768 resolution display, and the Acer Aspire Switch 11 SW5-171 with an Intel Core i3 processor, 4 GB RAM, and a 1920 × 1080 resolution display.

== Laptop models ==
The Aspire series was introduced in 2017 with four main models: 1, 3, 5 and 7. In 2018, the Aspire 6 was launched exclusively for Malaysia. The Aspire 6 is simply an Aspire 5 with Captain America-inspired aesthetics. As with many Windows laptops, different models may have different specification in different parts of the world, but most of the Aspire laptops, produced from 2005 to 2012, were developed with a standardized modular internal design (known as Intel Common Building Block). The latest models are the Aspire 14 AI and Aspire 16 AI.

=== Aspire series ===
The Aspire 5 was originally launched with Intel Kaby Lake processors (i5-7200u and i7-7500u) and then was updated with Kaby Lake R processors (i5-8250u and i7-8550u) and more recently updated with Whiskey Lake processors (i3-8145u, i5-8265u and i7-8565u) which came along with a redesign which involved slimmer bezels but dedicated maintenance panels for RAM and storage was omitted. More recent products such as the A715-74G and A715-75G feature a choice between the Coffee Lake 9th Gen Intel Core i5 and i7 processors, or the AMD Ryzen 3 and 5 processors.

=== Aspire E series ===
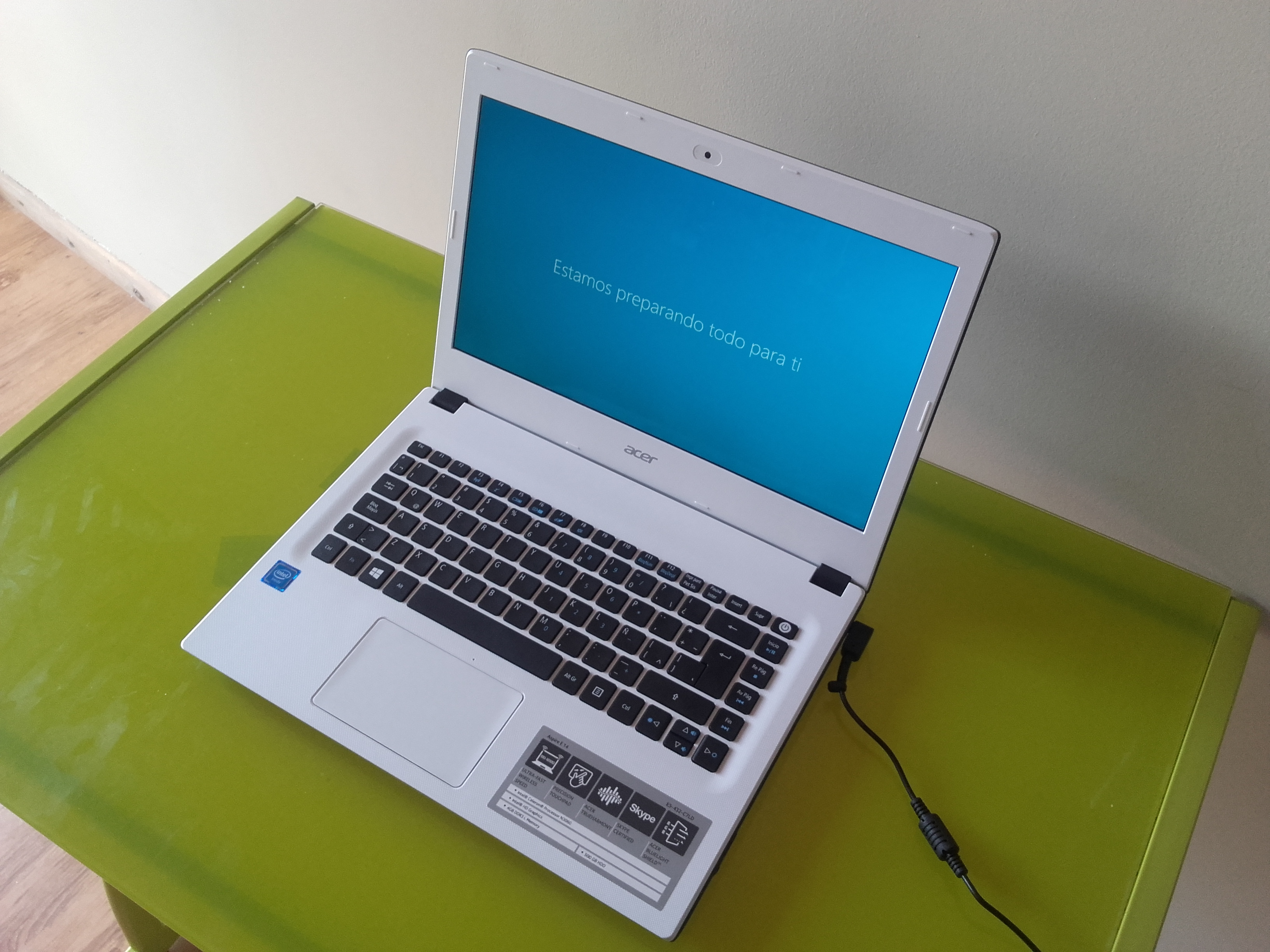
Acer Aspire E15

The Aspire E series also contains the Aspire ES sub series. The Aspire E comes with either a 14" or 15.6" 16:9 display named E14 and E15 respectively. The Aspire ES comes with either an 11.6" or 14" 16:9 display named ES11 and ES14 respectively. The Aspire E series was updated annually with newer Intel and AMD processors.

The Aspire E series was replaced by the Aspire 3 and 5 in 2018.

=== Aspire One series ===
Acer Aspire One is a line of Aspire subcompact notebooks (netbooks) similar to the Asus EEE.

=== Aspire R series ===
The Acer Aspire R 11 (model R3-131-...) is an 11-inch convertible (2-in-1) laptop with a mainstream folding design. It has a display resolution of 1,366x768, and comes with Intel Celeron processors of the Braswell architecture, up to 500GB of HDD storage, and 4 GB of RAM.

The Acer Aspire R 14 (model R3-471T-...) is a 14-inch convertible (2-in-1) laptop with a mainstream folding design, similar to the Lenovo Yoga 3 14" laptop. It has a display resolution of 1,366x768, and comes with 5th generation Broadwell processors, a 1 TB HDD, and 8 GB of RAM.

The Acer Aspire R7 (model R7-572-...) is a 15.6-inch convertible (2-in-1) laptop with a single-hinge "Ezel" folding design. It has a display resolution of 1,920x1,080 and N-Trig DuoSense technology stylus support. It comes with 4th generation Haswell Processors, a 1 TB HDD, and 8 GB of RAM.

The Acer Aspire R13 (model R7-371t-...) is a 13.3" convertible (2-in-1) laptop with a double-hinge "Ezel" folding design. It has two available display resolutions of 1,920x1,080 or 2,560x1,440, and Synaptics stylus support. It comes with either 4th generation Haswell, 5th generation Broadwell processors or 6th generation Skylake processors, solid state hard drives in sizes of 128, 256, or 512 GB, and 8 GB of RAM.

The Acer Aspire R 15 (model R5-571T-...) is a 15.6 inch convertible (2-in-1) laptop with a mainstream folding design.

The Aspire R has since been replaced by the Acer Spin series.

=== Aspire S Series ===
The Acer Aspire S3 is a 13.3-inch Ultrabook with an Intel Core 1.6 GHz processor, 320 GB hard drive, a media card reader. Moreover, it has an integrated Intel HD Graphics 3000-chip and four gigabytes of RAM. Overall, the Ultrabook weighs 2.98 pounds.

The Acer Aspire S5 is a 13.3-Inch Ultrabook, which the company said is the world's thinnest Ultrabook at 15mm-thick. It weighs 2.97 pounds and includes an Intel Ivy Bridge processor, 8 GB of DDR3 RAM, SSD storage for speed and increased shock resistance plus professionally tuned Dolby Home Theater v4.

The Acer Aspire S7 is a 13.3-inch Ultrabook, a successor to the Aspire S5. It uses the same aluminum frame wrapping a pearly white plastic and Gorilla Glass encasement and is able to bend backwards 180 degrees and lie flat. It weighs roughly less than 1.3 kg and includes an Intel Ivy Bridge processor, 8 GB of DDR3 RAM, SSD storage for speed and increased shock resistance plus professionally tuned Dolby Home Theater v4.

The Acer Aspire S13 is a 13.3-inch Ultrabook, a successor to the Aspire S7. The computer has an Intel Core i5 dual-core processor, 1080p display, SSD storage, USB-C port, and 8GB of RAM.

The Aspire S series was replaced by the Aspire 7 in 2018.

=== Aspire Timeline Series ===
Acer Aspire Timeline is a discontinued sub-line of the Aspire series which consisted of Ultrabook. The indirect successor to the Aspire Timeline's are the Acer Swift lineup.

=== Aspire V Nitro Series ===
The Acer Aspire V Nitro series consists of the Acer Aspire V15 Nitro, and the Acer Aspire v17 Nitro.

The Acer Nitro 16 features a 16-inch QHD+ display at 165 Hz, powered by an AMD Ryzen 7 7735HS processor and an RTX 4070 GPU. The device is equipped with 16GB DDR5 SDRAM and a 1TB SSD for storage. Connectivity options include Wi-Fi 6E and Bluetooth 5.2, with ports such as 1x HDMI, 1x USB 2.0, 2x USB 3.2 Gen 2 Type-A, 2x USB 3.2 Gen 2 Type-C, and 1x RJ-45. The laptop has dimensions of 36 x 27.9 x 2.5 cm and weighs 2.79 kg. Alternative configurations offer different processors, GPUs, RAM sizes, and storage capacities.

=== Aspire V Series ===
The Acer Aspire V series consists of the Acer Aspire V, Acer Aspire V3, Acer Aspire V5, Acer Aspire V 13 and Acer Aspire V15.

The Acer Aspire V5 is available in 14 and 15.6 inches and comes with a silver scratch resistant exterior. Released in 2012. It comes configured with a 1.7 GHz Intel Core i5-3317M, 4 GB, 1600 MHz DDR3 of ram, and Windows 8. It is considerably slim and is offered in both 10-point multi-touch and non-touch variants. The V5 comes with a HD display with a resolution of 1366×768 pixels and a webcam on top.

The Aspire V series was replaced by the Aspire 7 in 2018

=== Aspire VX Series ===
The Acer Aspire VX 15 specifications includes the use of either an Intel Core i5-7300HQ or an i7-7700HQ, 8 or 16 GB DDR4 SDRAM, a 15.6" Full HD (1920x1080) 16:9 and either a NVIDIA GeForce GTX 1050 with 4 GB Dedicated Memory or a NVIDIA GeForce GTX 1050Ti with 4 GB Dedicated Memory.

The Acer Aspire VX 5 specifications includes the use of either an Intel Core i7-7700HQ, 8 GB DDR4 SDRAM, single-channel, a 15.6" 16:9, 1920x1080 pixel 141 PPI HD and either a NVIDIA GeForce GTX 1050 Ti (Laptop) - 4096 MB, Core: 1493 - 1620 MHz

The Aspire VX series was replaced by the Aspire 7 in 2018.

=== Aspire M series ===
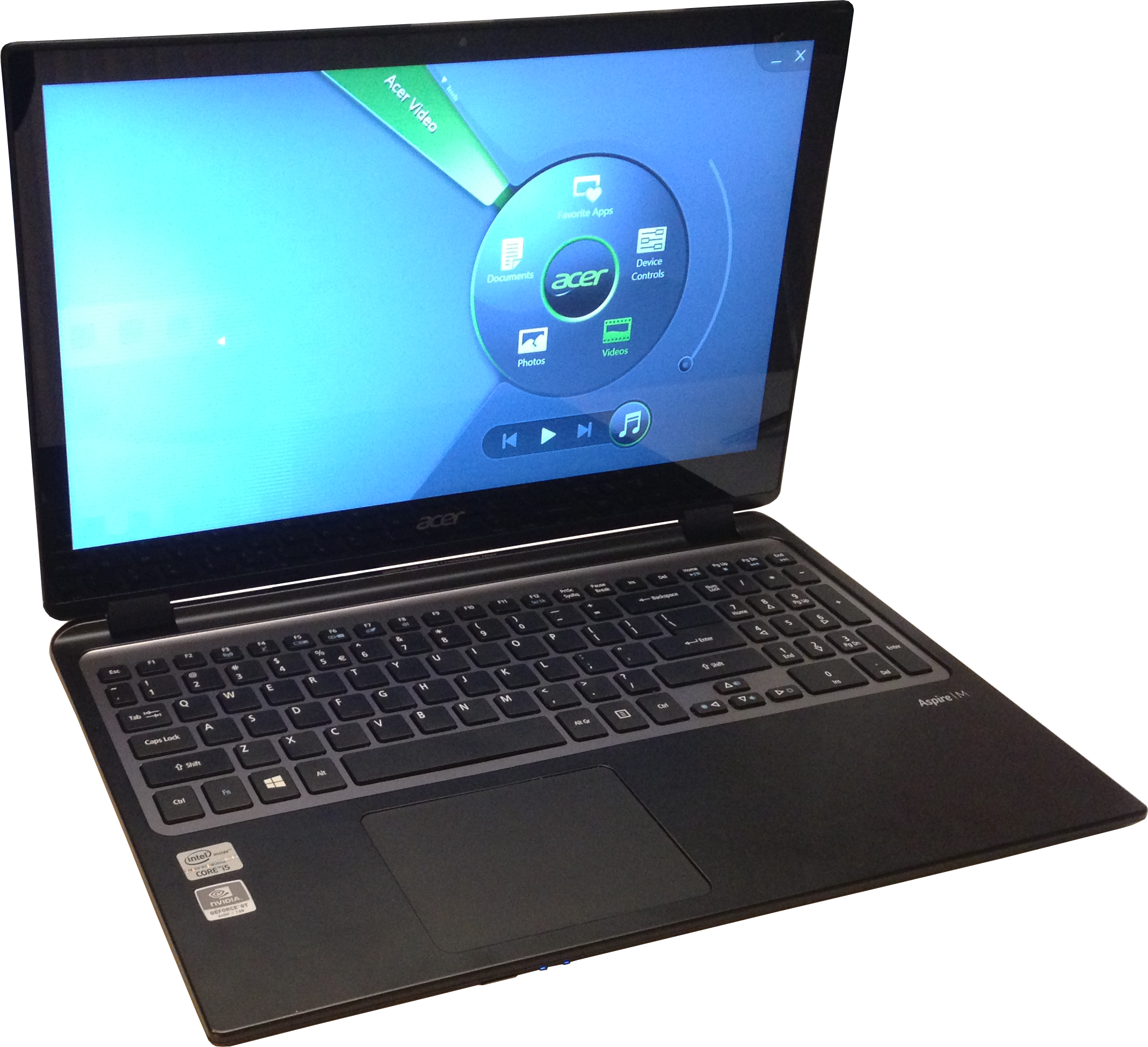
Acer Aspire M

The Aspire M sub-series has since been discontinued due to its bad performance compared to other competitors. Its unofficial successor is the Acer Swift series.

Reception
Year	Model	Publisher	Rating	Citation
2013	M5-583P-6428	PCWorld	3.5/5 stars	
2013	N/A	Wired	5/10	
2013	M5-583P-6428	Laptop Mag	4/5 stars	
N/A	M5-583P-6637	PC Mag	3.5/5 stars	

=== Aspire One Cloudbook ===
The Aspire One Cloudbook was a very-low-cost laptop released by Acer in 2015. The model featured a 14-inch, 1366 x 768 display, a 1.6-GHz Intel Celeron N3050 CPU, 2GB of RAM and 64GB of flash storage. The OEM build of Windows 10 contained a one-year free subscription offer to both Office 365 and a 1-TB OneDrive account, cloud-based productivity software and file storage from Microsoft (hence the name Cloudbook). It was the first machine released under Microsoft's cloudbook initiative, intending to compete with the Chromebook.

=== Aspire 4720z ===
Acer Aspire 4720z was a line of consumer laptops during 2006 to 2008. It featured Wireless B/G, Bluetooth, 5.1 audio output. These laptops were part of a class action lawsuit that claimed the laptops did not come with enough on-board RAM to run the pre-installed Windows Vista operating system.

=== Aspire 5310 ===
Acer Aspire 5310-301G12Mi. Processor family: Intel® Celeron® M, Processor frequency: 1.6 GHz. Display diagonal: 39.1 cm (15.4"), Display resolution: 1280 x 800 pixels. Installed RAM: 1 GB, RAM type: DDR2-SDRAM. Total storage capacity: 120 GB. Discrete graphics adapter model: Intel® GMA 950. Operating system installed: Linux. Weight: 2.8 kg.

=== Aspire 5022WLMi ===
Details: AMD Turion 64 mobile technology ML-30 processor with 1.6 GHz power, PCI Express graphics card - ATI Mobility Radeon X600, 512 MB RAM and 60 GB HDD.

=== Aspire 5738 ===
Acer Aspire 5738 is a dual-booting (Android and MS-Windows) 3D laptop which includes Dynamic Digital Depth TriDef software.

The Acer Aspire 5738PG computer also includes the Acer multi-touch technology.

== All-in-Ones models ==
=== List of Acer Aspire All-in-Ones Models ===
Model			Hardware				Display		
Name	Rel. date	Product code	CPU	GPU	RAM	Storage	Size	Specs.	Type
5600U	November 2012	DQ.SMLEK.001	Intel Core i3-3110M	NVIDIA GeForce GT 630M	4 GB DDR3 SDRAM	500GB 5400RPM HDD	23"	1920x1080	Touch LCD
5600U	November 2012	DQ.SN3AA.001	Intel Core i3-3110M	Intel HD Graphics 4000	8 GB DDR3 SDRAM	1TB 5400RPM HDD	23"	1920x1080	Touch LCD
5600U	November 2012	DQ.SNLAA.001	Intel Core i3-3120M	Intel HD Graphics 4000	8 GB DDR3 SDRAM	1TB 5400RPM HDD	23"	1920x1080	Touch LCD
5600U	November 2012	DQ.SNLAA.002	Intel Core i3-3120M	Intel HD Graphics 4000	4 GB DDR3 SDRAM	1TB 5400RPM HDD	23"	1920x1080	Touch LCD
5600U	November 2012	DQ.SNNEG.003	Intel Core i5-3230M	NVIDIA GeForce GT 630M	8 GB DDR3 SDRAM	1TB 5400RPM HDD	23"	1920x1080	Touch LCD
5600U	November 2012	DQ.SNPAA.001	Intel Core i5-3230M	Intel HD Graphics 4000	6 GB DDR3 SDRAM	1TB 5400RPM HDD	23"	1920x1080	Touch LCD
5600U	November 2012	DQ.SNPAA.003	Intel Core i5-3230M	Intel HD Graphics 4000	8 GB DDR3 SDRAM	1TB 5400RPM HDD	23"	1920x1080	Touch LCD
5920G									
7600U
A3-600
C20-220 Elxan
C20-720
C22-720
C22-760
C22-860
C24-760
C24-865
C24-963
U27-880
U5-610
U5-620
U5-710
Z1100
Z1110
Z1220
Z1-211
Z1-601
Z1-602
Z1-611
Z1-612
Z1620
Z1-621
Z1-621G
Z1-622
Z1-623
Z1650
Z1-751
Z1-752
Z1800
Z1801
Z1810
Z1811
Z1850
Z20-730
Z20-780
Z22-780
Z24-880
Z3100
Z3101
Z3-105
Z3-115
Z3170
Z3171
Z3280
Z3-600
Z3-601
Z3-605
Z3-610
Z3-613
Z3-615
Z3620
Z3-700
Z3-705
Z3-710
Z3-711
Z3-715
Z3730
Z3731
Z3760
Z3761
Z3770
Z3771
Z3800
Z3801
Z5101
Z5600
Z5610
Z5700
Z5710
Z5730
Z5735
Z5751
Z5760
Z5761
Z5770
Z5771
Z5801
ZC-102
ZC-105
ZC-106
ZC-107
ZC-602
ZC-605
ZC-606
ZC-610
ZC-700
ZC-700G
ZS600
ZS600G

== Desktop models ==
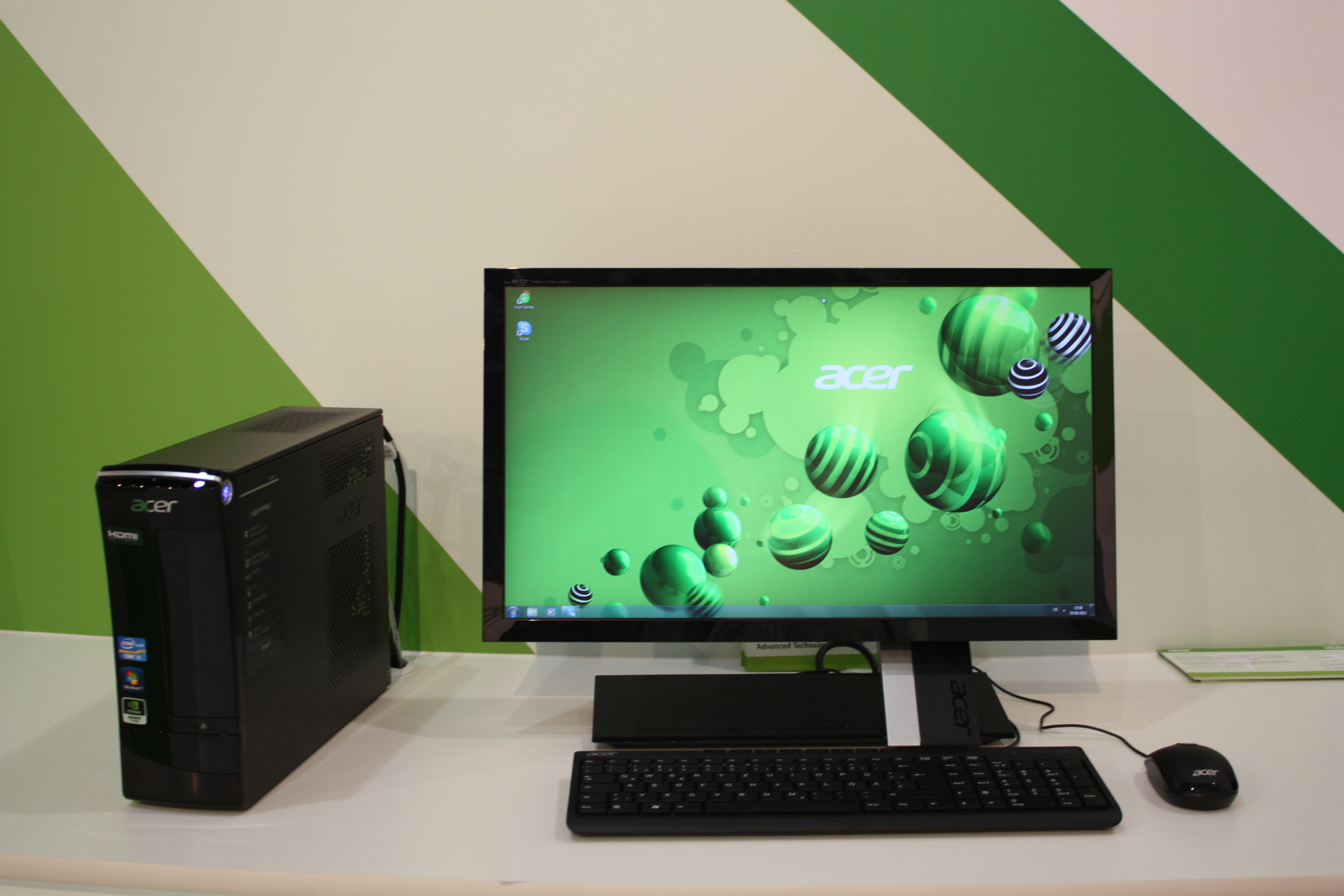
Aspire desktop with monitor

The original Aspire desktop computer was introduced in 1995; designed by Frog Design, it was characterized by a sloped case design, and sold in "charcoal" gray and a dark green "emerald" colors. It was cited, along with HP's Pavilion, as part of a trend towards more contemporary designs for PCs in home environments.

The AcerPower S series was replaced by the Aspire desktop series in 2002. The AcerPower S Series consisted of two types: the AcerPower Se Series and the AcerPower Sn Series desktop. Acer used to offer three desktop Aspire model lines. Later, Acer dropped the desktop offerings to two distinct models, the Acer Aspire XC and the more spacious Acer Aspire TC.
