= VoodooPC =

Canadian PC manufacturer, 1991–2008

Voodoo Computers Inc.
- Type: Subsidiary
- Industry: Computer hardware
- Founded: 1991; 35 years ago
- Founder: Rahul Sood
- Defunct: 2008
- Fate: Merged into HP
- Successor: HP
- Headquarters: Calgary, Canada
- Area served: Worldwide
- Key people: Rahul Sood (founder and CTO, Voodoo Brand, HP); Todd Bradley (VP, HP PSG)
- Products: Enthusiast personal computers
- Parent: Hewlett-Packard
- Website: www.voodoopc.com

Voodoo Computers Inc., commonly known as VoodooPC, was a Canadian luxury personal computer company.

Founded in 1991 by Rahul Sood, it was acquired by HP in 2006, which incorporated it in 2008. Voodoo specialized in desktop high-performance computing. By 2013, the Voodoo name was no longer used, and was replaced by the brand name OMEN, which used the same logo until 2020.

== Desktop offering ==
Voodoo PC was most well known for its desktops. They experimented with liquid cooling partnering with CoolIT Systems. On June 10, 2008, the OMEN computer's complete redesign was revealed, showing a new brushed metal case and mounted 7" auxiliary screen.

== History ==
The company was founded in 1991 by Rahul Sood, and in 1999 Ravi Sood (brother to Rahul) joined the board of operations. Prior to the acquisition, Voodoo employed roughly 40 people between their Canadian headquarters and their web development office in Bangalore.

=== Acquisition by HP ===
On September 28, 2006, Rahul Sood announced on his blog that HP would be acquiring VoodooPC for an undisclosed amount. Sood would assume the position of chief technology officer for HP's Global Voodoo Business Unit.

In August 2007, HP announced the HP Blackbird 002 gaming PC with the label VoodooDNA inside the case, and was released on September 15, 2007.

=== New direction ===
Since the acquisition of Voodoo in 2006, the business has been re-developing the brand of Voodoo. This was culminated on 10 June 2008 with the revelation that Voodoo would focus on high-end, top spec computers rather than gaming machines. Voodoo would also continue with Voodoo DNA machines with HP.

In 2009, HP used the Envy line as a high-performance computer without the Voodoo branding or Voodoo DNA.

In 2014, HP relaunched the OMEN brand as a thin and light gaming laptop. Two years later, HP expanded the brand to desktops and monitors.

== Products ==
=== Discontinued ===
- Rage (gaming desktop)
- Aria (media centre)
- Hexx (gaming desktop, small form factor)
- Vibe (media centre/Xbox combination)
- Eden (fanless/silent gaming desktop)
- Omega (canceled)
- HP Blackbird 002 (high-end gaming desktop with VoodooDNA)
- HP Firebird (lower-end compact gaming desktop with VoodooDNA)
- HP Firefly (dual-screen laptop/cancelled)
- Envy 133 (premium ultraportable notebook) with Splashtop instant-on OS
- F Class
- Fury
- EGAD
- DOLL
- Idol
- Epic

== See also ==
- List of computer system manufacturers
