= Cloudbook =

Small storage laptop that uses the cloud

A cloudbook is a class of laptop computer, originally defined as any lightweight laptop with a small solid-state drive (SSD), built-in Wi-Fi, and a minimal operating system configured to prioritize web browsing, web applications, and cloud storage. The concept emerged in 2007 with the cancelled Palm Foleo. In 2010, Google announced a reference design for a cloudbook running the company's ChromeOS; called Chromebook, the first models were released in 2011. Chromebook was a massive success for Google and found widespread adoption, especially in educational markets.

In the mid-2010s, the term cloudbook came to define a competing platform to Chromebook (a so-called "Chromebook killer"): inexpensive, lightweight laptops, with 32- or 64-GB eMMCs, running a pared-down installation of Microsoft's Windows, prioritizing web apps while being able to run lightweight local apps. This initiative for a new type of cloudbook was pushed by Microsoft starting in 2015; the first such cloudbook released was Acer's Aspire One Cloudbook in 2015. Later cloudbooks were released by Asus and HP (HP Stream). Microsoft-partnered cloudbook manufacturers typically sold their machines with one-year free subscription offers for both Office 365 and OneDrive, cloud-based productivity software and file storage, respectively, from Microsoft.

== See also ==
- Thin client
- Netbook
- Smartbook
