= Acer Aspire Timeline =

Series of notebook computer models

Aspire Timeline
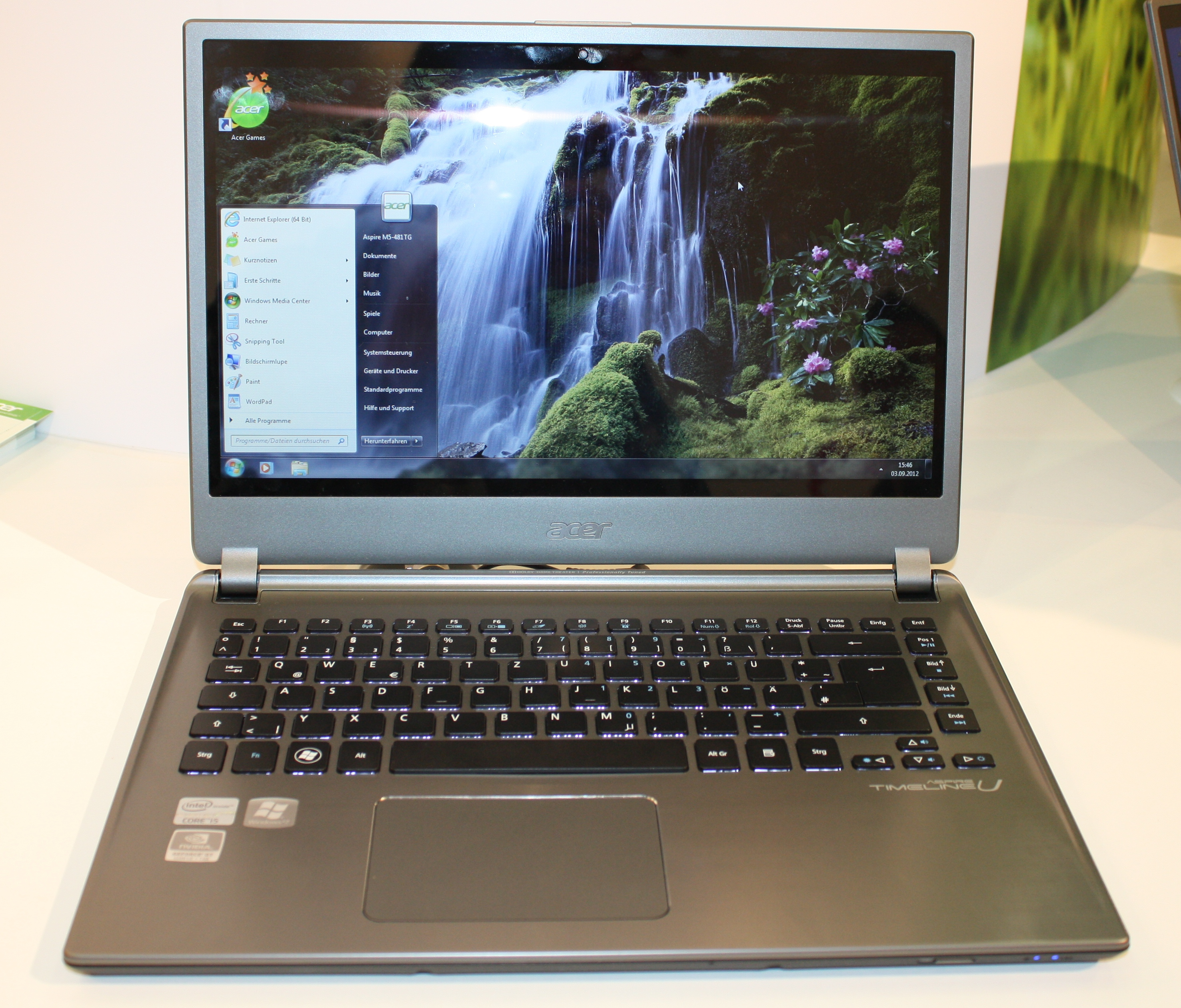
- Acer Timeline U M5-481TG
- Manufacturer: Acer Inc.
- Type: Laptop/Notebook
- Released: 29 January 2008 (original release); 6 April 2011 (current model)
- Lifespan: 30 January 2008-2012
- Operating system: Windows
- Successor: Acer Swift
- Related: Acer Aspire
- Website: acer.com/timeline

Aspire Timeline is a series of notebook computers manufactured by Acer Inc. designed to achieve battery life in excess of eight hours with ultrathin designs. The first generation Acer Timeline models use Intel's ultra low voltage (ULV) processors and Intel's Laminar Wall Jet technology.

== Aspire Timeline ==
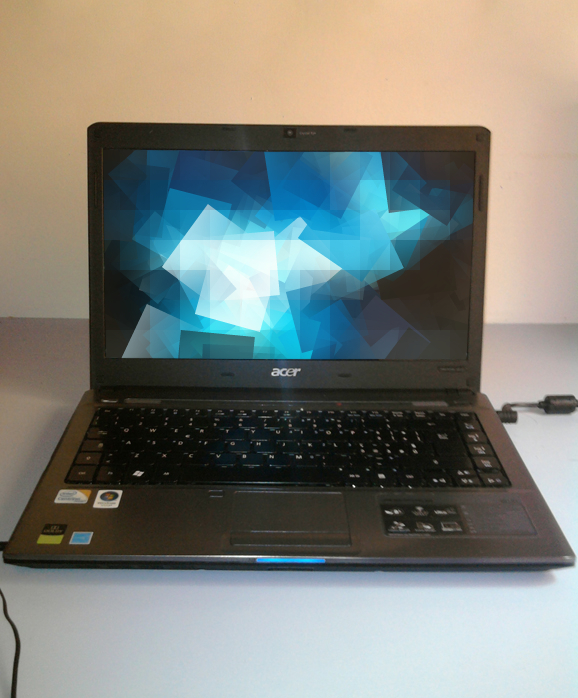
Aspire Timeline 4810T

There are six Aspire Timeline models: Aspire 1810T, Aspire 1810 Olympic Edition, Aspire 3810T, Aspire 4810T, Aspire 4810 Olympic Edition, Aspire 5810T.

== Aspire TimelineX ==
In 2010, Acer launched a new Aspire TimelineX series that employ Intel Core processors. The 9-cell battery model is claimed by the company to last up to 12 hours.

Aspire TimelineX (2010) models:

- Aspire 3820T
- Aspire 4820T
- Aspire 5820T
- Aspire 3820TG
- Aspire 4820TG
- Aspire 5820TG
- Aspire 1830T

In April 2011, Acer released the third generation of Timeline models in Taiwan which sport the Intel's Sandy Bridge processor.

Aspire Timeline X (2011) lineup:

- 3830T

The 3830T has two versions: a Core i3-2310M and Core i5-2430M. It measures 13.3 inches and has a 1366×768 LED backlit LCD, Intel HD Graphics 2000/3000, 500/750GB hard drive for storage, 4/6GB DDR3 RAM and 3 USB ports, and weighs 4.08 pounds.

- 4830T

The 4830T contains the Core i5-2430M. It measures 14 inches and has a 1366×768 LED backlit LCD, Intel HD Graphics 3000, 640GB hard drive for storage, 4/6GB DDR3 RAM and 3 USB ports, and weighs 4.78 pounds.

- 5830T

The 5830T contains the Core i5-2450M. It measures 15.6 inches and has a 1366×768 LED backlit LCD, Intel HD Graphics 3000, 750GB hard drive for storage, 6GB DDR3 RAM and 3 USB ports, and weighs 5.49 pounds.

- 3830TG

The 3830TG has several versions: a Core i3-2330M, a core i5-2410m, a Core i5-2430M and a Core i7-2620m. It measures 13.3 inches and has a 1366×768 LED backlit LCD, NVIDIA GeForce GT540M graphics and an Intel Hd 2000/3000, it switches between the two using Nvidia's Optimus technique. A 500GB hard drive for storage, 4GB DDR3 RAM and 3 USB 2.0 ports, of which are USB 2.0 and one of them being a 3.0 port that can be used to charge external devices when the laptop is turned off. It also features Kenwood's Dolby Home Theater speakers and weighs 4.12 pounds.

- 4830TG

The 4830TG same specification as above (except for Core i3-2330M). It measures 14 inches and weighs 4.67 pounds, contains DVD super multi DL drive (this is not present in the 3830TG). It has a 640GB hard drive for storage. For connectivity and ports, it features a Bluetooth 2.1+EDR, one faster USB 3.0 port, microphone in, 3.5mm audio jacks for headphone out, memory card reader (SD card, Memory Stick, Memory Stick PRO, MultiMediaCard, xD-Picture Card, SDXC Memory Card ), HDMI port, VGA port, Gigabit Ethernet LAN with RJ connector and 802.11 b/g/n wireless for internet connections.

- 5830TG

The 5830TG has the same specification as above (except for the 3830TG version which runs on Core i3-2330M). Its screen is 15.6 inches and weighs 5.49 pounds, It contains DVD super multi DL drive (this is not present in the 3830TG).

== Acer Aspire Timeline Ultra family ==
In 2012, Acer introduced the new Aspire M3 of the Timeline Ultra family The Acer Aspire Timeline Ultra series is slim and light, just 20 mm thin. It has a 15.6-inch display and weighs less than five pounds. It was first shown at the Consumer Electronics Show (CES) in Las Vegas in January 2012, then in March at the CeBIT tradeshow in Hannover, Germany. The Aspire Timeline Ultra M3-581TG contains an Intel Core i7-2637M ULV processor, up to 6GB of RAM.

== Reception ==
The Acer Aspire line was generally well received. Some models such as the Aspire 3820T were awarded by the international press.

== See also ==
- Acer Aspire
- Acer TravelMate
