= Rahul Sood =

Canadian businessman

- Born: Canada
- Occupations: CEO and Co-Founder of Irreverent Labs; Former GM of Microsoft Ventures; Co-Founder of Unikrn; Founder of VoodooPC; Co-Founder of the Jaffna Stallions
- Spouse: Asma Sood

Rahul Sood is the CEO and co-founder of Irreverent Labs, the former CEO of Unikrn), and was the founder of VoodooPC. Sood was also an early investor in AR/VR company Vrvana he's also an investor in blockchain play to earn horse racing game ZED Run, and high-end PC gaming company, MAINGEAR.

In 2007 Business 2.0 magazine claimed Sood to be 83rd out of 101 persons on their "Who matters now?" list. After VoodooPC was acquired by HP, Sood announced his resignation in November 2010. In December 2010, after spending 18 years with multiple startups, he announced that he joined Microsoft as the GM for System Experience in the Interactive Entertainment Business. Shortly after he started Microsoft Ventures and was the general manager up until his resignation in November 2014. In November 2014 he started Unikrn, an esports betting platform, and raised 2.5m in a seed round. By July 2015 Sood then raised an additional $7m for Unikrn Mark Cuban, Advancit Group, Freelands Capital, and a few more. Also in 2015 Sood was on CNBC discussion the future of Esports, where he was quoted as saying it would eventually be as big as the NFL. In an interview with Startup Grind, Sood talks about the challenges of raising money for entrepreneurs in the Seattle area. In November 2019 he did a TedX Talk in San Juan on the massive growth of Esports.

Rahul's company Unikrn under his leadership created the Unikoin token in 2015 and built its platform around the virtual token over the following two years. In 2017 they moved the token to the public blockchain on the Ethereum Mainnet ultimately selling $31 million through the ICO process. UnikoinGold was created in the fall of 2017 which later came under an SEC inquiry. In 2020 Unikrn agreed to an order of Settlement with the SEC, pursuant to which Unikrn will pay a total of $6.1 million to the SEC so they can begin to manage the claims process. Unikrn voluntarily suspended future development or use of UnikoinGold and the SEC used the agreed settlement to establish a fair fund to provide refunds to all token holders. Unikrn volunteered for the settlement despite lack of consensus within the SEC that the UnikoinGold constituted a security, with Commissioner Hester M. Peirce saying, "I do not concur in my colleagues’ opinion that Unikrn's token offering constituted a securities offering[...] By failing to challenge ourselves to experiment with new approaches to regulation, we, and those whose interests we are pledged to serve, risk surrendering the fruits of innovation. I respectfully dissent from the commission's actions today relating to Unikrn."

In November 2020, he became the co-owner of the Jaffna Stallions franchise ahead of the 2020 Lanka Premier League. He was also mentioned in a follow-up article in GeekWire talks about Seattle based tech leaders investing in cricket teams. In this article the owners of the Jaffna Stallions talk about their desire to help rebuild Jaffna through the sport of cricket. Sood is co-owner of the team. The Jaffna Stallions ended up winning the inaugural LPL championship on December 16, 2020. His net worth is estimated to be around 30 million as of 2021.
