= Acer Swift =

Line of notebook computers by Acer, Inc

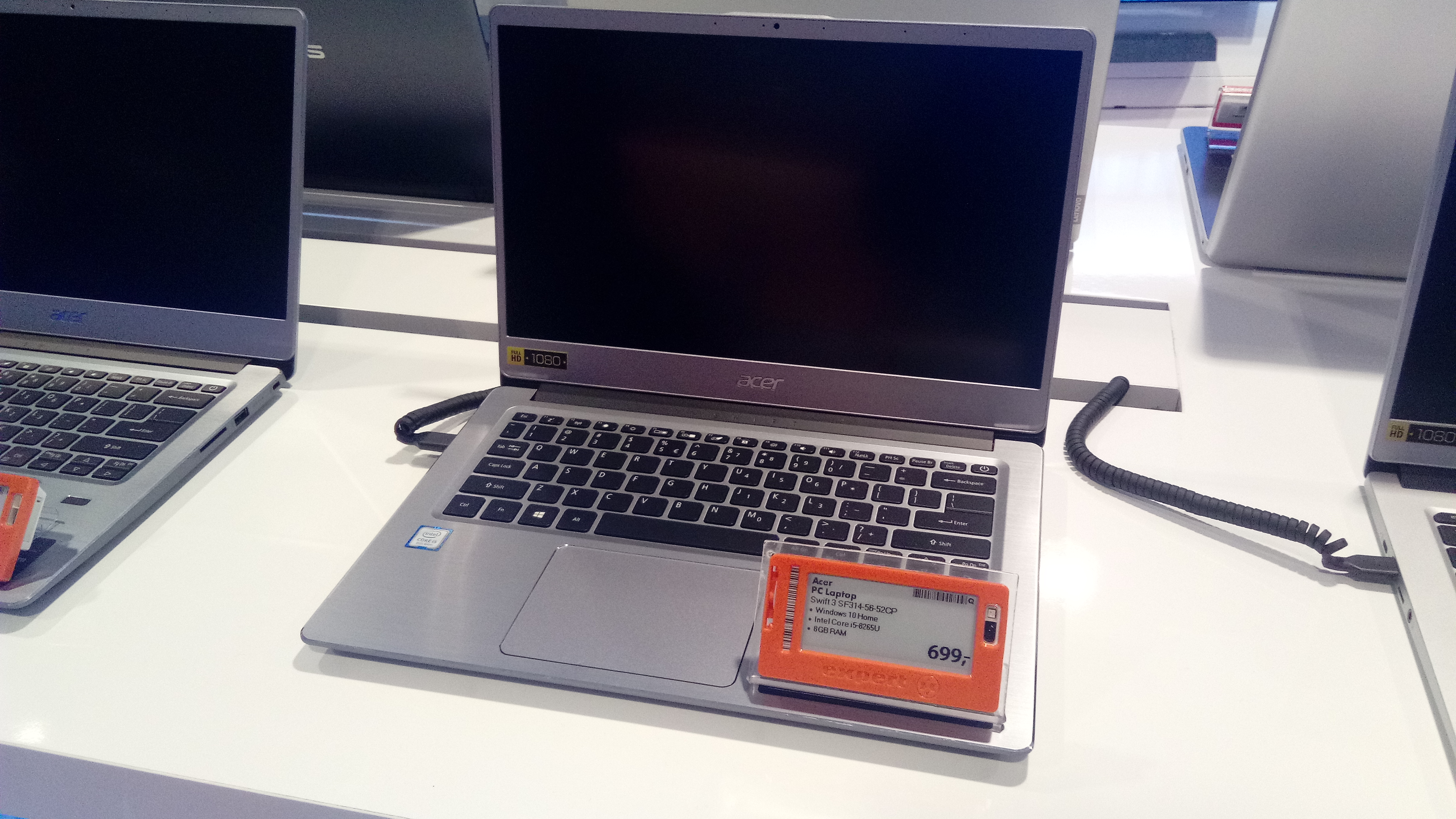
- Manufacturer: Acer Group
- Product family: Swift
- Released: September 2015; 11 years ago
- Operating system: Windows
- CPU: Intel, AMD
- Graphics: Intel, AMD, Nvidia
- Marketing target: Consumer
- Predecessor: Acer Aspire Timeline
- Related: Acer Aspire, Acer Spin, Acer Predator

The Swift is a line of consumer-oriented high-end laptop computers produced by Acer. They are designed to be lightweight and thinner than typical laptops. Laptops in the Swift series are the Swift 1, Swift 3, Swift 5 and Swift 7.

In an announcement in February 2023, Acer changed its model serial, with the Swift 3, Swift 5 and Swift 7 series renamed as the Swift Go, Swift and Swift X respectively. But some models like the Acer Swift Neo released in 2025 don't have Go or X branding.

== List of Acer Aspire Swift models and specifications ==
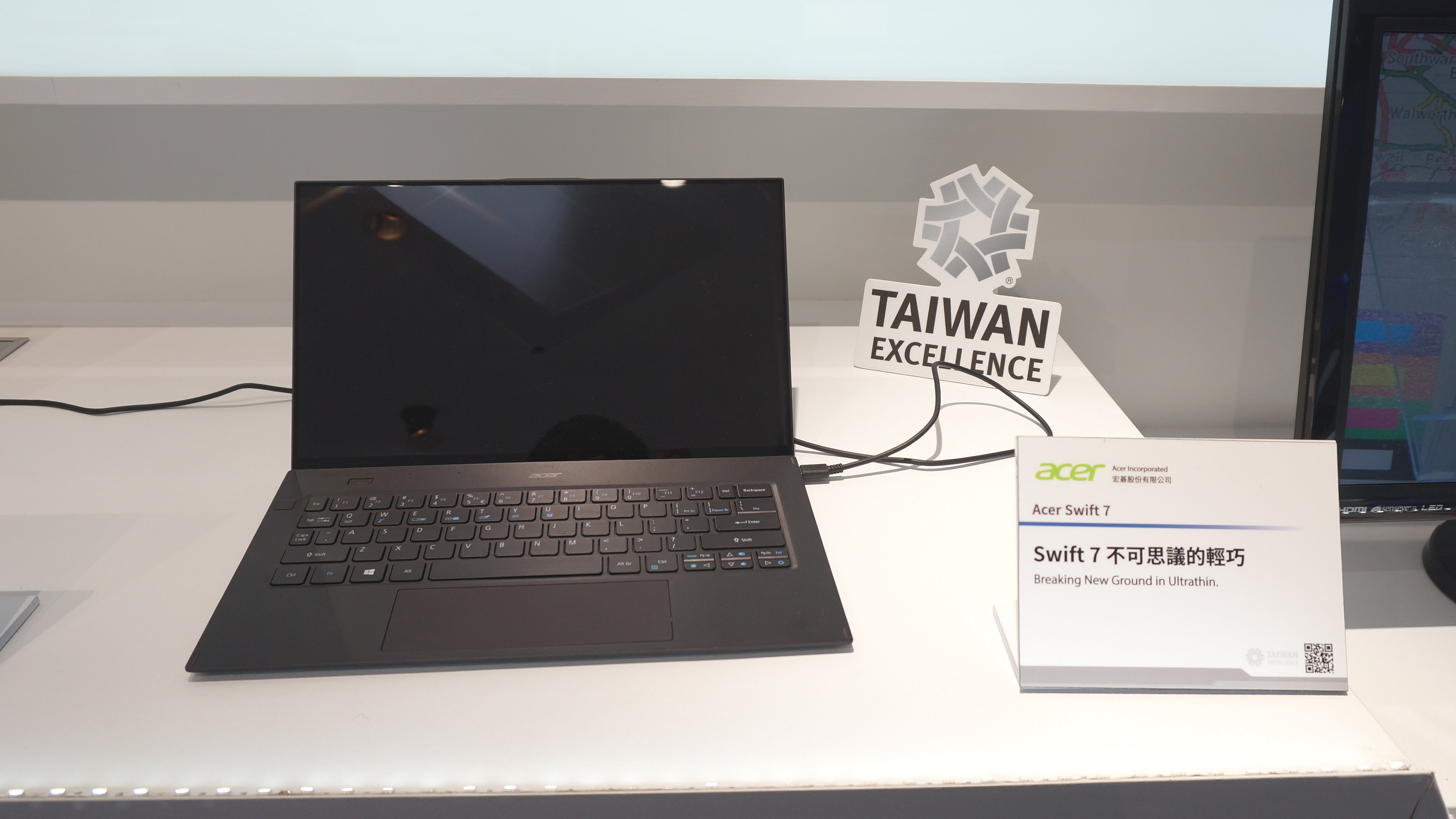
Acer Swift 7 (2020)

The Swift lineup consists of several sub-series, including:

- Swift 1: Entry-level models with basic CPUs (Celeron/Pentium), aimed at budget-conscious users.
- Swift 3: Mid-range models featuring Intel Core i5/i7 or AMD Ryzen processors, thin-and-light form factors, and modern connectivity (Wi-Fi 6, USB-C).
- Swift 5: Premium ultraportables with Intel Evo certification, magnesium-aluminum chassis, long battery life, and lightweight designs.
- Swift 7: (later rebranded as Swift Go): Ultra-thin models with ARM or Intel Core processors and minimal bezels.
- Swift X: Performance-oriented models with discrete GPUs (e.g., NVIDIA RTX series) for creators and power users.
- Swift Neo: A model of the Swift series with Core Ultra series processors, 16-32GB RAM and 500-2TB SSDS.

In 2023, Acer renamed its Swift 3, 5, and 7 series to Swift Go, Swift, and Swift X, respectively.

== Technical Characteristics ==
Chassis and Weight

Swift notebooks share a focus on thin and light construction:

• Swift 3 weighs approximately 1.2 kg and measures about 14.95 mm thick.

• Swift 5 features a magnesium-alloy chassis (~1.05 kg) and Intel Evo certification.

Almost all Swift laptops are under 1.5 KG.

Processors and Certification

Swift models are powered by modern CPUs:

- Swift 1: Intel Celeron/Pentium (Jasper Lake)
- Swift 3: Intel 12th–13th Gen Core i7 (e.g., i7‑1260P), AMD Ryzen; some models are Intel Evo certified
- Swift 5: Intel Evo devices with Core i7‑1165G7 and Iris Xe graphics

Display and Input

Swift displays range from entry-level FHD IPS to high-end OLED:

- Swift 1: 14″ FHD IPS, 250 cd/m² brightness, anti-glare
- Swift 3 OLED: 14″ 2880×1800 HDR OLED, 400 cd/m², 16:10 aspect ratio
- Swift 5: FHD IPS touchscreen with Gorilla Glass

Most models include backlit keyboards, precision touchpads, and Windows Hello via fingerprint readers or IR cameras.

Battery Life and Charging

Battery life is a highlight of the Swift series:

- Swift 1: ~13.5 hours from a 48 Wh battery
- Swift 5: Up to 15 hours from a 56 Wh battery
- Swift 14 & 16 AI (2024): 17–24 hours depending on CPU configuration

Connectivity and Ports

Swift laptops are equipped with robust I/O options:

- Dual USB-C with Thunderbolt 4 or USB4, USB-A ports, HDMI 2.1, audio jack
- Modern wireless connectivity: Wi‑Fi 6/6E and Bluetooth 5.x
- TypeC charging in newer models
