= Brushed metal =

Aesthetic treatment of metal surfaces

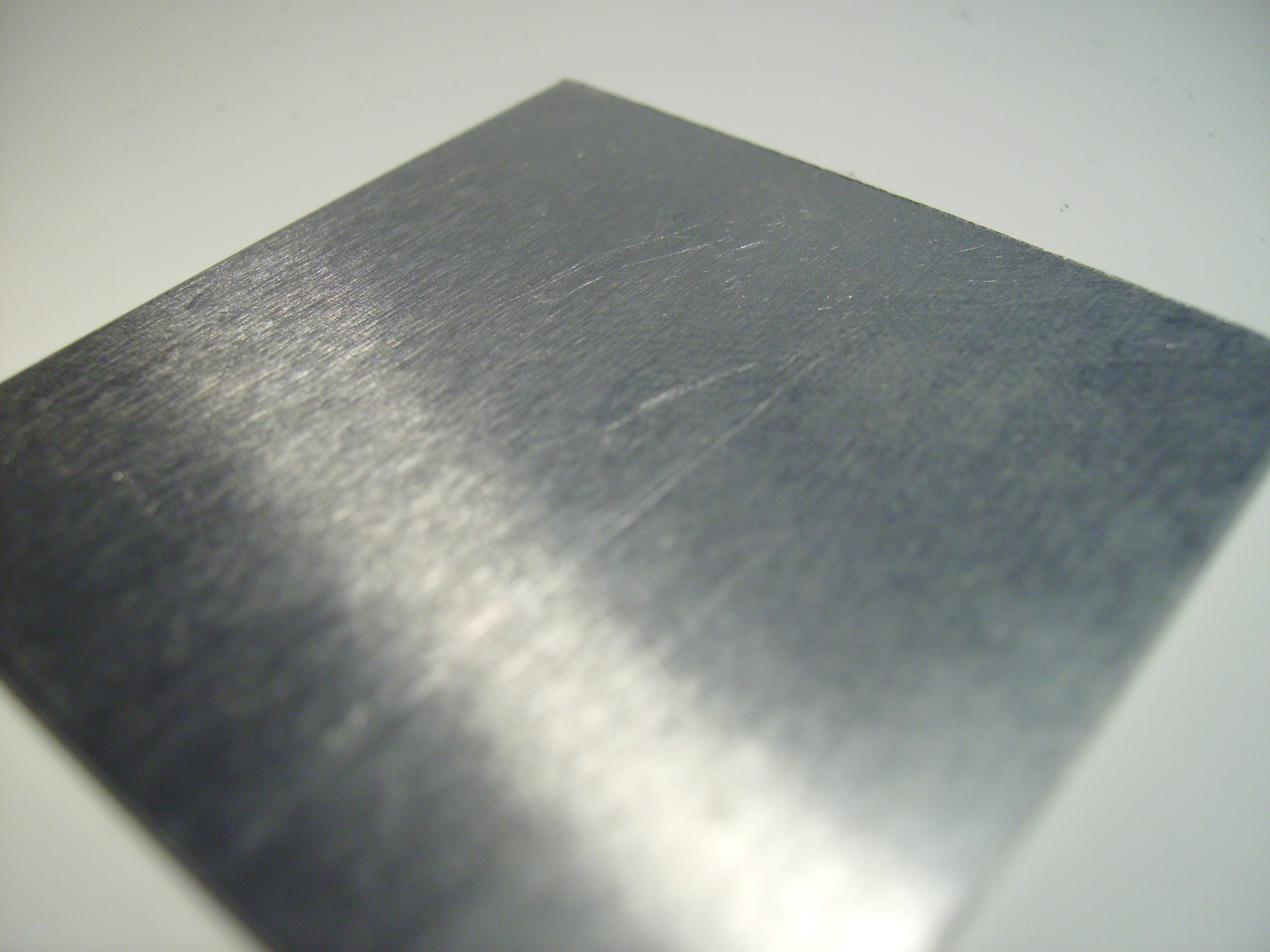
A piece of brushed aluminium

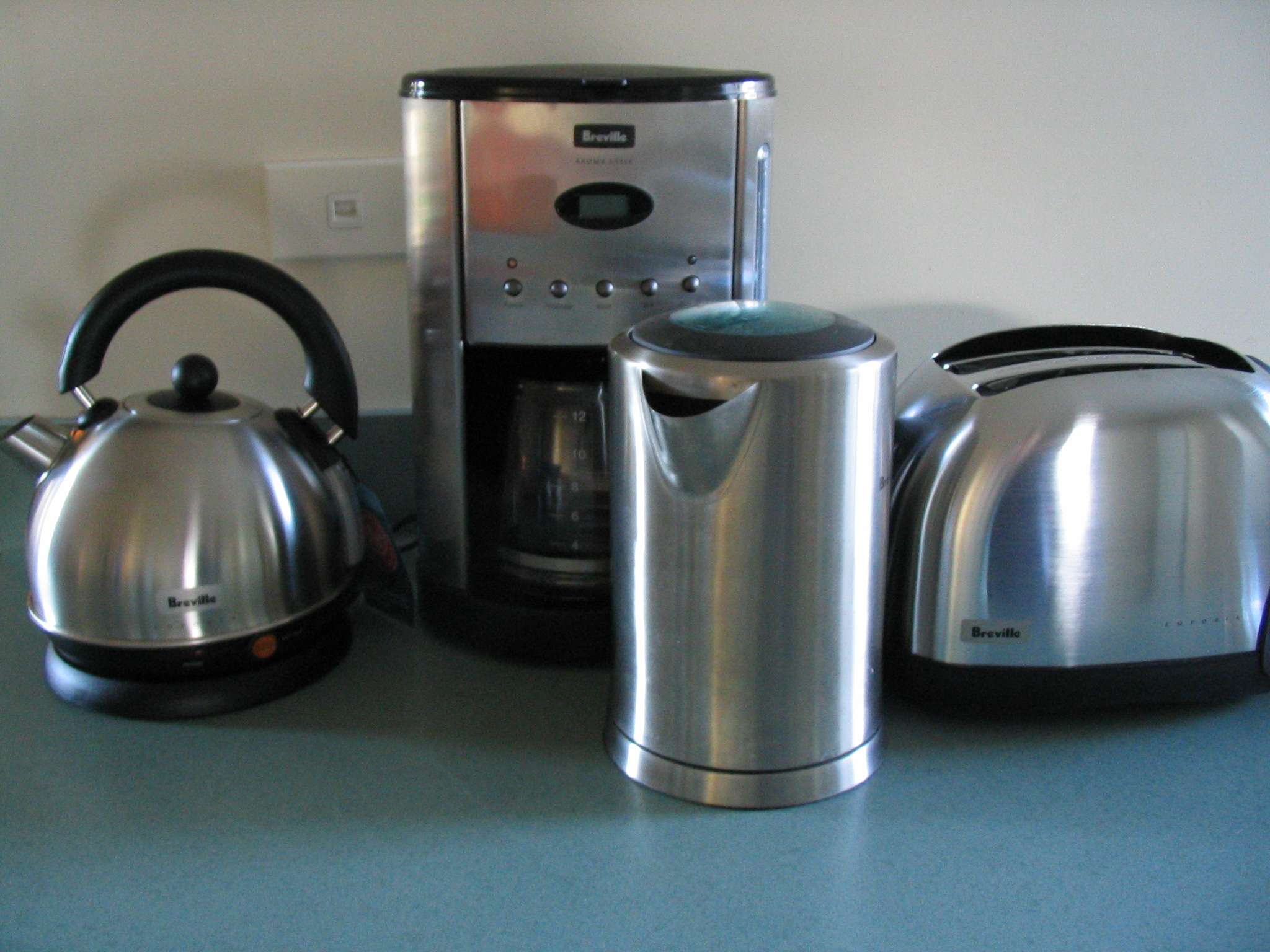
A collection of brushed stainless steel Breville small appliances

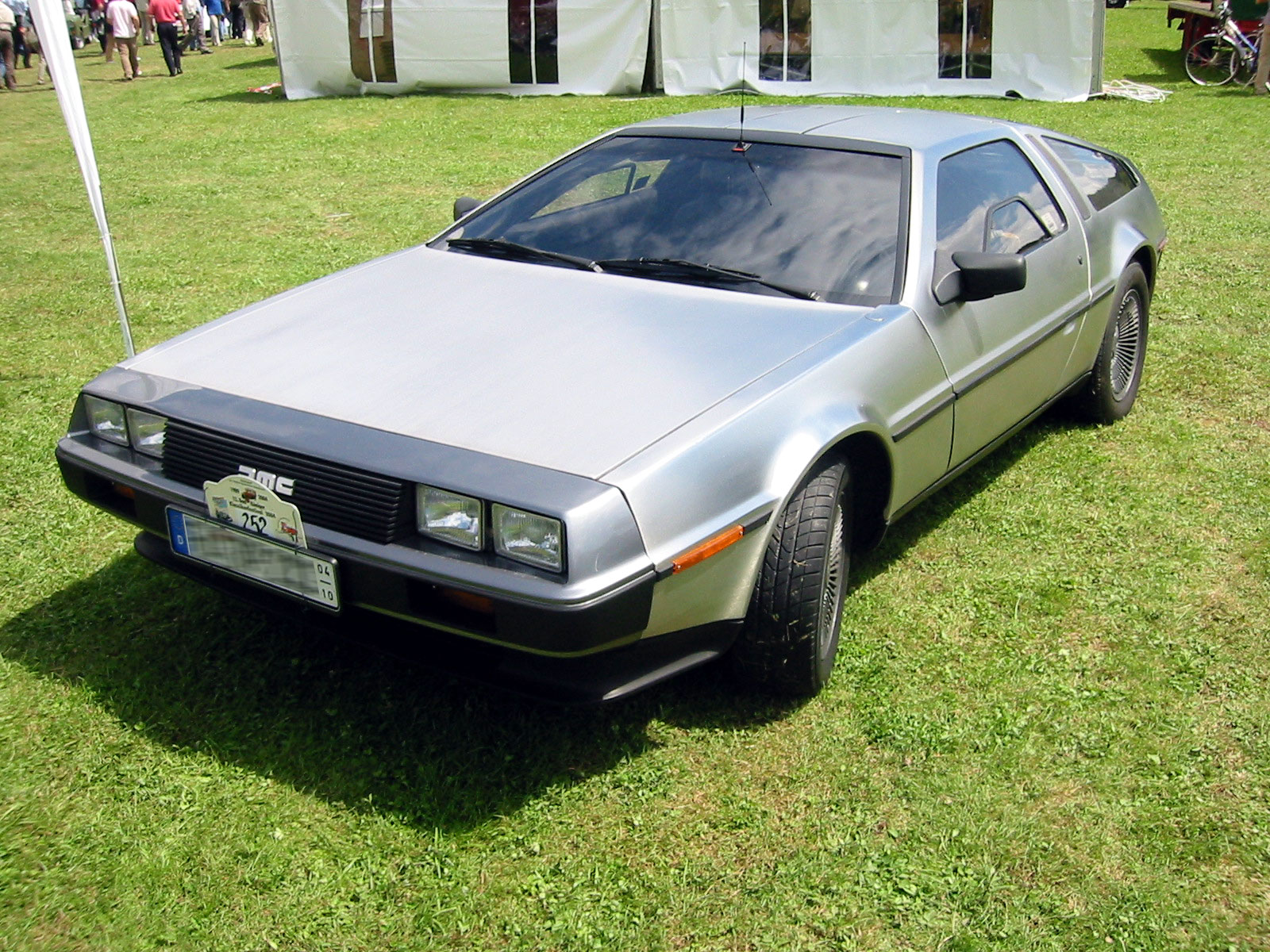
A DeLorean featuring non-structural brushed stainless steel panels

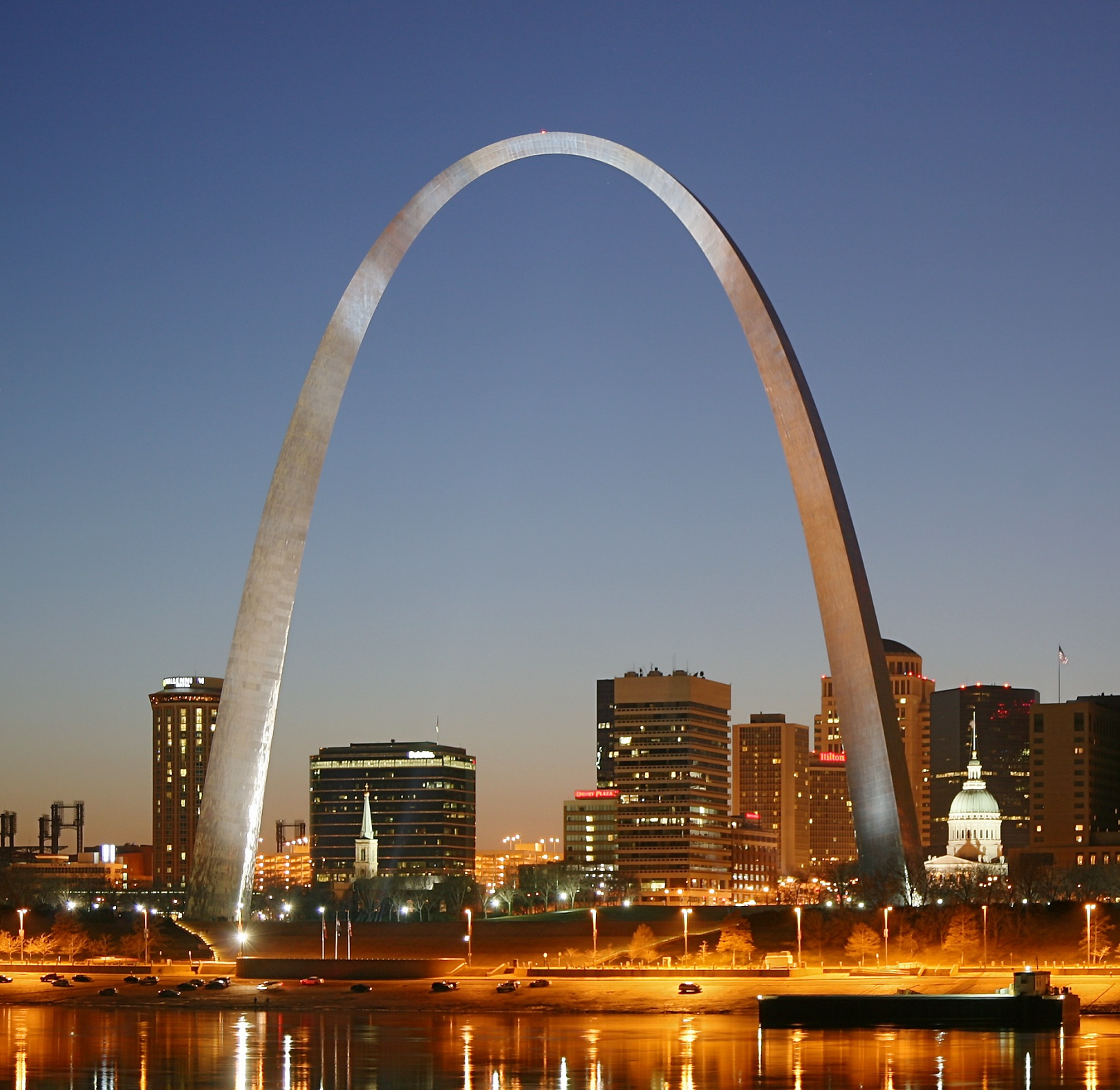
The Gateway Arch in St. Louis, Missouri

Brushed stainless steel or dull polished metal is metal with a unidirectional satin finish. It is produced by polishing the metal with a 120–180 grit belt or wheel then softening with an 80–120 grit greaseless compound or a medium non-woven abrasive belt or pad.

Commonly brushed metals include stainless steel, aluminium and nickel. Brushed finishes are popular in both small appliances and whiteware, and feature in architecture and automotive design. The Gateway Arch and DMC DeLorean are both clad in brushed stainless steel. The intensity of the brushed finish is specified as a surface roughness and is typically 0.5–1.5 micrometres R_{a}.

== Characteristics ==
Brushing gives metal a distinctive look, as it retains some but not all of its metallic lustre and is given a pattern of very fine lines parallel to the brushing direction. For this reason, it is commonly used for decorative items like jewellery and watches.

A brushed finish is susceptible to damage. Brushed finishes also typically have a detrimental effect on corrosion resistance. In particular the brushed texture limits the ability of fluid to bead on the material surface. In the case of stainless steel the grooves of the finish can accumulate chloride ions which break down the chromium oxide passivation layer, enabling rusting to occur.
