= Fair Fund =

Fund established by U.S. Securities and Exchange Commission

A Fair Fund is a fund established by the U.S. Securities and Exchange Commission (SEC) to distribute disgorgements (returns of wrongful profits) and penalties (fines) to defrauded investors. Fair Funds were established by the Sarbanes–Oxley Act of 2002.

== Purpose ==
Fair Funds hold money recovered from an SEC case, then choose how to distribute the money to defrauded investors, and does so, then terminates.

Note that under Kokesh v. Securities and Exchange Commission, 137 S. Ct. 1635 (2017), disgorgement is considered a penalty, and therefore a punishment.

== History ==
Fair Funds were established by the Sarbanes–Oxley Act of 2002 (SOX), specifically 15 U.S.C. § 7246(a) (the "Fair Fund Provision").

Prior to Sarbanes–Oxley, civil penalties obtained by the SEC based on actions under the securities laws were paid to the United States Treasury, and were not distributed by the SEC to investors who were injured by the securities fraud. SOX gave the SEC the right to distribute civil penalties to defrauded investors, at its discretion.

Important caselaw in this regard was Official Committee of Unsecured Creditors of WorldCom, Inc. v. Securities and Exchange Commission, 467 F.3d 73 (2nd Cir. 2006) ("Committee v. SEC" or "WorldCom"), which found in favor of the SEC, affirming its right to discriminate between classes of investors, here discriminating in favor of investors who recovered less in bankruptcy court, and against those who received more.
