= HP OpenView =

Network and systems management software

HP OpenView Software
- Developers: Hewlett-Packard, HP Software Division
- Type: Network and systems management tools
- License: Proprietary
- Website: www8.hp.com/us/en/software/enterprise-software.html

HP OpenView is the former name for a Hewlett-Packard product family that consisted of network and systems management products. In 2007, HP OpenView was rebranded as HP BTO (Business Technology Optimization) Software when it became part of the HP Software Division. The products were available as various HP products, marketed through the HP Software Division. HP Software became part of HPE after the HP/HPE split and HPE Software was eventually sold to Micro Focus.

HP OpenView software provided large-scale system and network management of an organization's IT infrastructure. It included optional modules from HP as well as third-party management software, which connected within a common framework and communicated with one another.

== History ==
The foundational OpenView product was Network Node Manager (NNM), network monitoring software based on SNMP. NNM was used to manage networks and could be used in conjunction with other management software, such as CiscoWorks.

In April 2004, HP bought Novadigm and its Radia suite. In December 2005, it acquired Peregrine Systems with its IT asset and service management software and integrated it into HP OpenView. In November 2006, HP completed its purchase of Mercury Interactive Corp., subsequently integrated Mercury application and software life-cycle management products (QualityCenter, LoadRunner/PerformanceCenter, WinRunner/QTP) into the HP Software & Solutions portfolio. In September 2007, HP acquired Opsware.

In early 2007, alongside the integration of Mercury Interactive, Peregrine Systems and Opsware products, HP OpenView products were rebranded under the HP Software Division business, and the OpenView and Mercury names were phased out. The HP OpenCall name continued as part of the HP Software Division business. HP Software became part of HPE after the HP/HPE split and HPE Software was eventually sold to Micro Focus; the merger was completed on 1 September 2017.

== Products ==
- HP OpenView Network Node Manager (OV NNM)
- HP Operations Manager (OM) — monitor systems and applications using agents
  - HP OMW - Operations Manager (Windows) (formerly OVOW, formerly VantagePoint Operations for Windows)
  - HP OMU - Operations Manager (Unix) (formerly OVOU, formerly VantagePoint Operations for Unix, sometimes referenced as ITO, formerly Operation Center " OPC")
- HP OpenView ServiceManager (formerly Peregrine ServiceCenter)- now HP Software Service Manager
- HP OpenView AssetManager (formerly Peregrine AssetCenter)
- HP OpenView Connect-It - A data and process integration tool
- HP OpenView Service Desk (OVSD) - migration to HP Software Service Manager is optional
- HP OpenView Internet Services (OVIS) - Discontinued
- HP OpenView Service Navigator (integrated in HP Operations Manager for Unix since 1996)
- HP OpenView Transaction Analyzer (OVTA) - Discontinued
- HP OpenView SOA Manager
- HP OpenView Select Identity (OVSI) - Discontinued
- HP OpenView Select Access (OVSA) - Discontinued
- HP OpenView Select Audit - Discontinued
- HP OpenView Select Federation - Discontinued
- HP OpenView Service Information Portal - Discontinued
- HP Software Universal CMDB (UCMDB)
- Enterprise Systems Management (ESM)

=== Performance ===
- HP OpenView Performance Agent (OVPA
- HP OpenView Performance Insight (OVPI)
- HP OpenView Performance Manager (OVPM)
- HP OpenView Reporter (OVR) 2.0, 3.0, 3.5, 3.6 and 3.80
- HP OpenView GlancePlus

=== Fault/Resource Status Monitoring ===
- HP OpenView TeMIP — A Telecoms OSS service (formerly just known as TeMIP when owned by Compaq-Digital Equipment Corporation)

=== Provisioning/fulfillment ===
- HP OpenView Service Activator (OVSA) - rebranded as HP Service Activator (HPSA)

=== Storage ===
- HP Software Storage Essentials
- HP OpenView Storage Data Protector
- HP OpenView Storage Mirroring
- HP OpenView Storage Mirroring Exchange Failover Utility
- HP OpenView Dashboard (formerly Service Information Portal (SIP) — provides a web portal for HP OpenView management products)
- HP OpenView Storage Area Manager (OV SAM) - Discontinued

=== HP OpenView Smart Plug-ins ===
(SPIs) — These are add-ons products for OpenView Operations for additional management capabilities:

- HP OpenView SPI for BEA Tuxedo
- HP OpenView SPI for BEA WebLogic
- HP OpenView SPI for BEA WebLogic Integration
- HP OpenView SPI for BMC CONTROL-M Job Scheduling / Workload Automation Solution
- HP OpenView SPI for BlackBerry Enterprise Server (BES)
- HP OpenView SPI for Citrix
- HP OpenView SPI for Databases (Oracle, Microsoft SQL Server, Sybase, and Informix)
- HP OpenView SPI for Documentum
- HP OpenView SPI for IBM DB2
- HP OpenView SPI for IBM WebSphere Application Server
- HP OpenView SPI for Lotus Domino/Notes
- HP OpenView SPI for Microsoft Exchange
- HP OpenView SPI for Microsoft Windows
- HP OpenView SPI for MySQL Databases
- HP OpenView SPI for OpenVMS
- HP OpenView SPI for Oracle Application Server
- HP OpenView SPI for PeopleSoft
- HP OpenView SPI for Remedy ARS Integration
- HP OpenView SPI for SAP
- HP OpenView SPI for Dollar Universe
- HP OpenView SPI for Siebel
- HP OpenView SPI for HP Service Manager
- HP OpenView SPI for Storage Area Manager
- HP OpenView SPI for Terminal Server
- HP OpenView SPI for TIBCO
- HP OpenView SPI for UNIX OS
- HP OpenView SPI for Web Servers
- HP OpenView SPI for VMware
- HP OpenView SPI for WebSPOC ITSM Integration

=== Network Node Manager SPIs ===
- Network Node Manager for Advanced Routing (for NNM version 7 only)
- Network Node Manager SPI for Quality Assurance (for NNMi version 9 and later)
- Network Node Manager SPI for Traffic (for NNMi version 9 and later)
- Network Node Manager SPI for IP Telephony
- Network Node Manager SPI for LAN/WAN Edge (for NNM version 7 only)
- Network Node Manager SPI for MPLS VPN (for NNMi version 9 and later)
- Network Node Manager SPI for IP Multicast (for NNMi version 9 and later)

=== HP OpenView Configuration Management ===
HP Configuration Management software, formerly Radia from Novadigm, is now part of HP Client Automation Software which is now owned by Accelerite, a product division of Persistent Systems. The following products were part of the OpenView product set:

- HP OpenView Configuration Management Application Self-Service Manager
- HP OpenView Configuration Management Application Manager
- HP OpenView Configuration Management Inventory Manager
- HP OpenView Configuration Management OS Manager
- HP OpenView Configuration Management Patch Manager
- HP OpenView Configuration Management Application Usage Manager
- HP OpenView Client Configuration Manager

=== IUM ===
HP OpenView Internet Usage Manager (IUM) provides convergent mediation. It collects, processes and correlates usage records and events from network elements and service applications across voice and data services for prepaid, post-paid and real-time charging in wireless, wireline and cable networks. This usage data can be passed on to business support systems for usage-based billing systems, capacity management and analysis of subscriber behavior.

=== HP Software Business Availability Center (BAC) ===
Formerly products from Mercury Interactive and now integrated into the HP portfolio:

- HP Software Business Availability Center / Business Process Monitor (BAC/BPM)
- HP Software Business Availability Center / Real User Management (BAC/RUM)
- HP Software Business Availability Center / System Availability Management (BAC/SAM)
- HP Software Business Availability Center / Diagnostics (BAC/Diags)
- HP Software Business Availability Center / Universal CMDB (BAC/uCMDB)
- HP Software Business Availability Center / Service Level Management (BAC/SLM)
- HP Software Business Availability Center / Problem Isolation (BAC/PI)
- HP Software Business Availability Center / Business Process Insight (BAC/BPI)
- HP Software SiteScope (SiS)

=== HP Software Data Center Automation (DCA) ===
Formerly products from Opsware and now integrated into the HP portfolio:

- HP Software Server Automation (SA) (formerly Opsware Server Automation System (SAS))
- HP Software Storage Essentials (SE) (HP existing product Storage Essentials has been merged with former Opsware Application Storage Automation System (ASAS))
- HP Software Operations Orchestration (OO) (formerly Opsware Process Automation System (PAS) (formerly iConclude Orchestrator))
- HP Software Network Automation (NA) (formerly Opsware Network Automation System NAS))

== User Groups ==
The OpenView Forum International was an OpenView user group. It became Vivit (in early 2007) and organized the yearly HP Software Forum. In 2007, HP took over responsibility for the HP Software Forum and renamed it HP Software Universe.

While it is not an actual "user group", the ITRC is an online forum about former OpenView and HP Software products. A new user group, the HP Software Solutions Community, officially launched publicly in April 2010 and includes all former software-related communities.
