= HPE Storage =

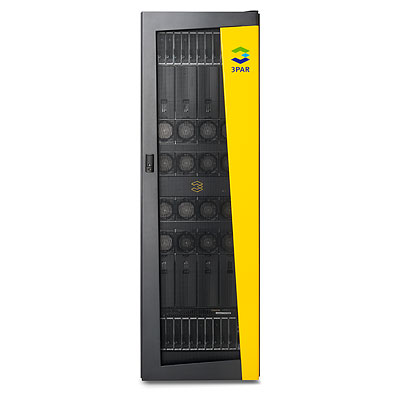
HP P10000 3PAR Storage System.

HPE Storage (formerly HP StorageWorks) is a portfolio of Hewlett Packard Enterprise storage products, includes online storage, nearline storage, storage networking, archiving, de-duplication, and storage software. HP and their predecessor, the Compaq Corporation, has developed some of industry-first storage technologies to simplify network storage. HP is a proponent of converged storage, a storage architecture that combines storage and compute into a single entity.

== 2011 products ==
HP Storage announced in August 2011:

- HPE 3PAR
  - Utility Storage - shifts workloads, boost utilization by logically pooling capacity
  - P10000, Peer Motion Software - refreshes/maintains storage, seeking zero application downtime
- and expanded its Converged Storage portfolio with the first federated storage capability to span from entry to high end systems and is available for both HP LeftHand and HP 3PAR storage systems.

== Tape libraries ==
- HP Storage ESL Gen3 (G3) (2009-2013 estimated) Tape Libraries
- HP Storage MSL Tape Libraries
- HP StorageWorks 1/8 G2 Tape Autoloader
- HP Storage 12000 Virtual Library System EVA Gateway
- HP Storage 9000 Virtual Library System
- HP StoreOnce D2D Backup System (various models)
- HP StoreOnce B6000 Backup System

== Storage networking ==
Many models have been rebadged from Brocade Communications Systems, Cisco, Emulex, and QLogic.

== Storage software ==
- HP StoreOnce Deduplication
- HP Storage Essentials
- HP StorageWorks Storage Mirroring

== PolyServe ==
PolyServe was founded in 2004 by Michael Callahan, serving as chief technology officer, and Carter George, serving as Vice-President, as "a software company in Portland, specializing in database and file serving."

HP, when it bought Compaq, acquired its StorageWorks; HP, when it bought PolyServe, placed its 100+ employees within StorageWorks.

An example of PolyServe's value is that a large British government agency which had 14 idle backup servers

- dropped the number to two, even though "PolyServe doesn't require the passive nodes, but he maintains them as extra protection" and
- reduced "failover time from five minutes to 30 seconds .. by 90% the number of users who lose connections during a failover."

== See also ==
- HP XP
- HPE 3PAR
- Nimble Storage
- OpenView Storage Area Manager
