= Stone Creek Ranch =

Gated community located in Delray Beach, Florida

Coordinates: 26.4357°N 80.1930°W

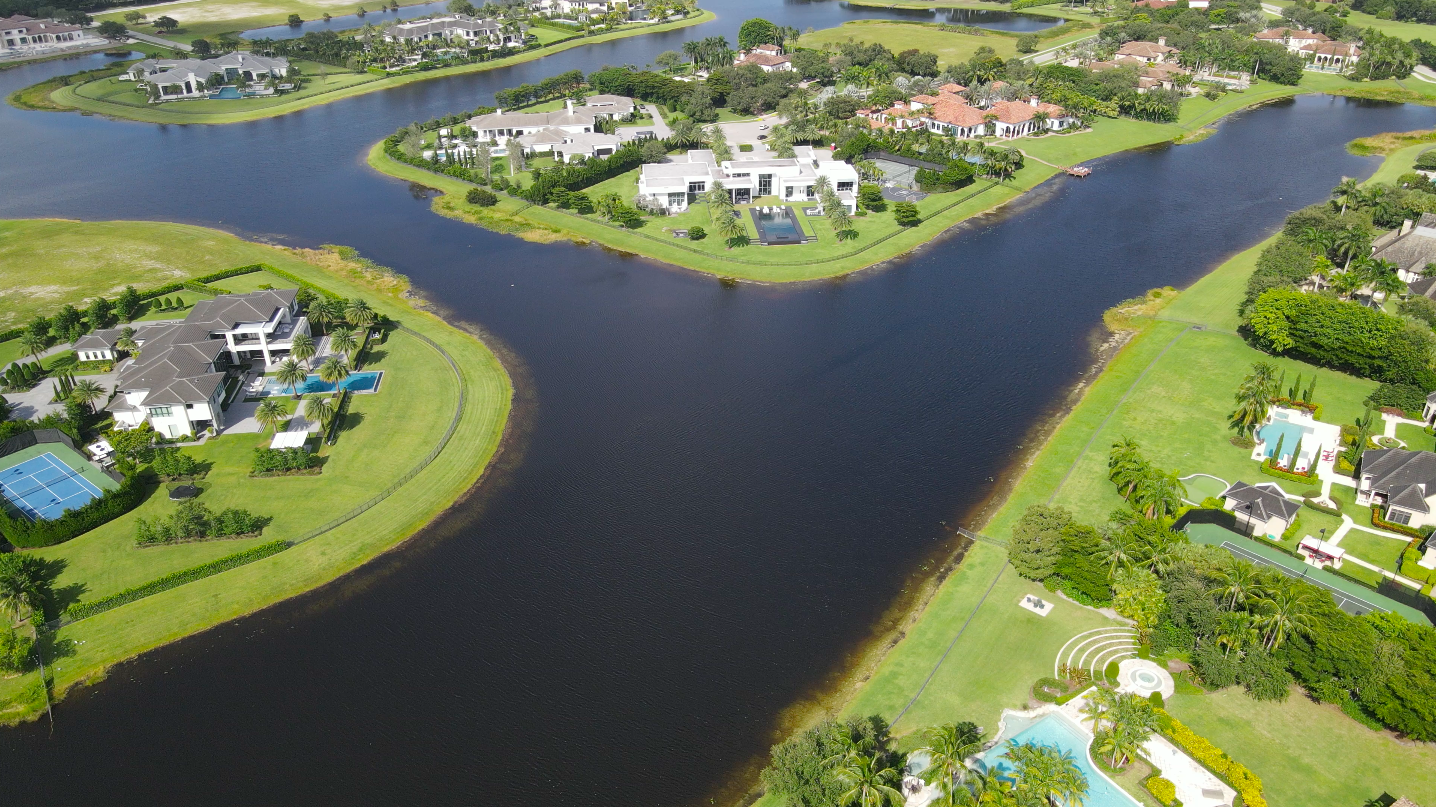
Aerial view of Stone Creek Ranch

Stone Creek Ranch is a gated community located in the western parts of Delray Beach, Florida, straddling the city's border with Boca Raton. The community of 37 homes, each with a minimum acreage of 2.5 acres, is often featured in luxury magazines and is known for the notability of its residents. The community was developed by Kenco Communities, a luxury real estate developer in South Florida, though renovations and new home have come from other companies and firms.

== Description ==
The community is accessible off of Lyons Road, between U.S. Route 441 and Florida's Turnpike. The community is circled by a ring road, Quiet Vista Circle, with four roads branching off of Quiet Vista Circle (Hawk Shadow Lane, Rockybrook Way, Bent Grass Court, and Jagged Creek Court). Two lakes lay within the community, a smaller one between Bent Grass and Jagged Creek, and a substantially larger one bordering many of the properties. Many homes within Stone Creek Ranch have outdoor tennis courts.

Constructions have made local headlines Some homes within Stone Creek Ranch have set local sales records and made national media. In 2021, CNBC journalist Ray Parsi covered a home known informally as the "Rockybrook Estate", which sold for around $19,000,000. The YouTube video published by CNBC touring the Rockybrook Estate currently has over 1.5 million views.

== Statistics ==
Stone Creek Ranch lies entirely within zip code 33446, and estimates for the average price of a home within the community fall around $15 million to $26 million USD. Florida annual property taxes for the Rockybrook estate, among the most expensive homes in the community, are estimated to be around $178,000 USD.

== Notable residents ==
=== Current ===
- Steve Cohen, hedge fund manager and owner of the New York Mets
- Cafaro Company
- George Holm, CEO of Performance Food Group
- Mark Wahlberg (Movie Star)|

=== Former ===
- Antonio Neri, CEO of Hewlett Packard Enterprise
- Steve Newman, former CEO of Loehmann's
- Gerry Smith, CEO of The ODP Corporation
