= Polytron =

Polytron may refer to:

- Polytron Corporation, an indie game company
- Polytron (electronics company), an electronics company based in Indonesia
- Polytron (software company), a defunct software company based in the United States
