= PVCS =

Source code version control software

PVCS Version Manager
- Original author: Polytron
- Developer: Micro Focus
- Release: 1985; 41 years ago
- Stable release: 25.4 / December 2025; 11 months ago
- Written in: C, C++, Java
- Operating system: DOS, Windows, Unix-like
- Type: Version control
- License: Proprietary software
- Website: www.microfocus.com/products/pvcs/

PVCS Version Manager (originally named Polytron Version Control System) is a software package by Serena Software Inc., for version control of source code files.

PVCS follows the "locking" approach to concurrency control; it has no merge operator built-in (but does, nonetheless, have a separate merge command). However PVCS can also be configured to support several users simultaneously attempting to edit the file; in this case the second chronological committer will have a branch created for them so that both modifications, instead of conflicting, will appear as parallel histories for the same file. This is unlike Concurrent Versions System (CVS) and Subversion where the second committer needs to first merge the changes via the update command and then resolve conflicts (when they exist) before actually committing.

Originally developed by Don Kinzer and published by Polytron in 1985, through a history of acquisitions and mergers, the product was at times owned by Sage Software of Rockville (1989), Maryland (unrelated to Sage Software of the UK), Intersolv 1992, Micro Focus International 1998 and Merant PLC 2001. The latter was acquired by Serena Software in 2004, which was then acquired by Silver Lake Partners in 2006.

Synergex ported both the PVCS Version Manager and the PVCS Configuration Builder (an extended make utility, including a variant of the command line tool make) to various Unix platforms and OpenVMS.

In 2009, Serena Software clarified that it will continue to invest in PVCS and provide support to PVCS customers for the foreseeable future.
PVCS Version Manager 8.5 release (2014) introduces both new feature and new platform support.

In 2016, Micro Focus International announced the acquisition of Serena Software to again become the custodians of PVCS.

A point release was shipped in 2021.

In 2023, OpenText announced the acquisition of Micro Focus.

== See also ==
- List of version control software
