= Polytron (software company) =

Polytron Corp.
- Type: Private
- Industry: Manufacturing of custom and proprietary electronics, IT management
- Founded: 1982
- Founders: Richard Kinnaird, Don Kinzer, Charlie Perkins, Doug Root

Polytron Corp. was a software company founded in 1982 to create a line of instrumentation products for the IBM Personal Computer. It was the creator of the Polytron Version Control System (PVCS). The company was acquired by Sage Software of Rockville, Maryland in 1989, and is now part of Serena Software.

== Background ==
The original company goal was to create a line of instrumentation products for, or based on, the then–recently introduced IBM personal computer. The company was founded in 1982 by Richard Kinnaird, Don Kinzer, Charlie Perkins, and Doug Root. With the exception of Root, all of them had worked at Tektronix in various hardware and/or software engineering positions. The company's headquarters was established in Elkhart, Indiana.

=== Product development ===
The first product developed was a GPIB controller (computing) plug-in board for the IBM PC. The founders eventually came up with the idea of creating one or more software development tools for the PC which they could sell to provide working capital. The first such product was PolyLibrarian, an object module library utility, which was introduced in late 1982 and written by Kinzer. At the time, there were few, if any, object module librarians available to PC programmers. In 1983, Polytron introduced PolyMake, an MS-DOS version of the well known Unix make utility, initially written by Perkins. The PolyMake product was followed in 1985 by the Polytron Version Control System (PVCS) (also written by Kinzer), that was loosely based on the RCS change control system authored by Walt Tichy while at Purdue University.

=== Refocus ===
By the time that PVCS was released, Perkins had left the company. The three remaining founders realized that the business they had developed creating and selling software development tools had more profit potential than the original product idea. Consequently, no more effort was applied to pursuing the original product development plan.

== Acquired ==
In 1989, the company was acquired by Sage Software of Rockville, Maryland (unrelated to Sage Software of the UK). In 1991, Sage Software merged with Index Technology to become Intersolv Inc. In 1998, Intersolv merged with Micro Focus International, and the new company was renamed Merant, PLC. In 2004, Serena Software acquired a portion of Merant (in part to acquire the ownership rights for PVCS). Serena was itself acquired in 2006, becoming a portfolio company of Silver Lake Partners, however Micro Focus reacquired Serena Software in 2016.
