= UCMDB =

UCMDB is a software product from OpenText that generates and maintains a Configuration Management Database of information technology items. The current product name is "OpenText Universal Discovery and CMDB". It includes a mechanism for automated discovery of IT infrastructure components, such as computers, network devices, storages and software.

UCMDB is included in several Open Text products and supports ITIL-based configuration management and change management processes.

UCMDB was developed by Mercury Interactive. It was acquired by HP in 2006 and is currently owned by Open Text.

== DDMA ==
The DDMa component (Discovery and Dependency mapping Advanced) of UCMDB works by scanning ranges of IP addresses within pre-set probe IP ranges, using ping, ICMP echo requests and Nmap to locate live IP addresses and open TCP ports, and IP address harvesting techniques by querying ARP/Cache tables of level 3 network devices. Resulting current IP addresses are then translated into CIs which function as input for deeper level discovery. The pyramid model is designed to ensure that only relevant sources are being queried, resulting in lower network and node load.

== See also ==
- ITIL
- ITSM
- CMDB
