= Antonio Neri (businessman) =

Businessman (born 1967)

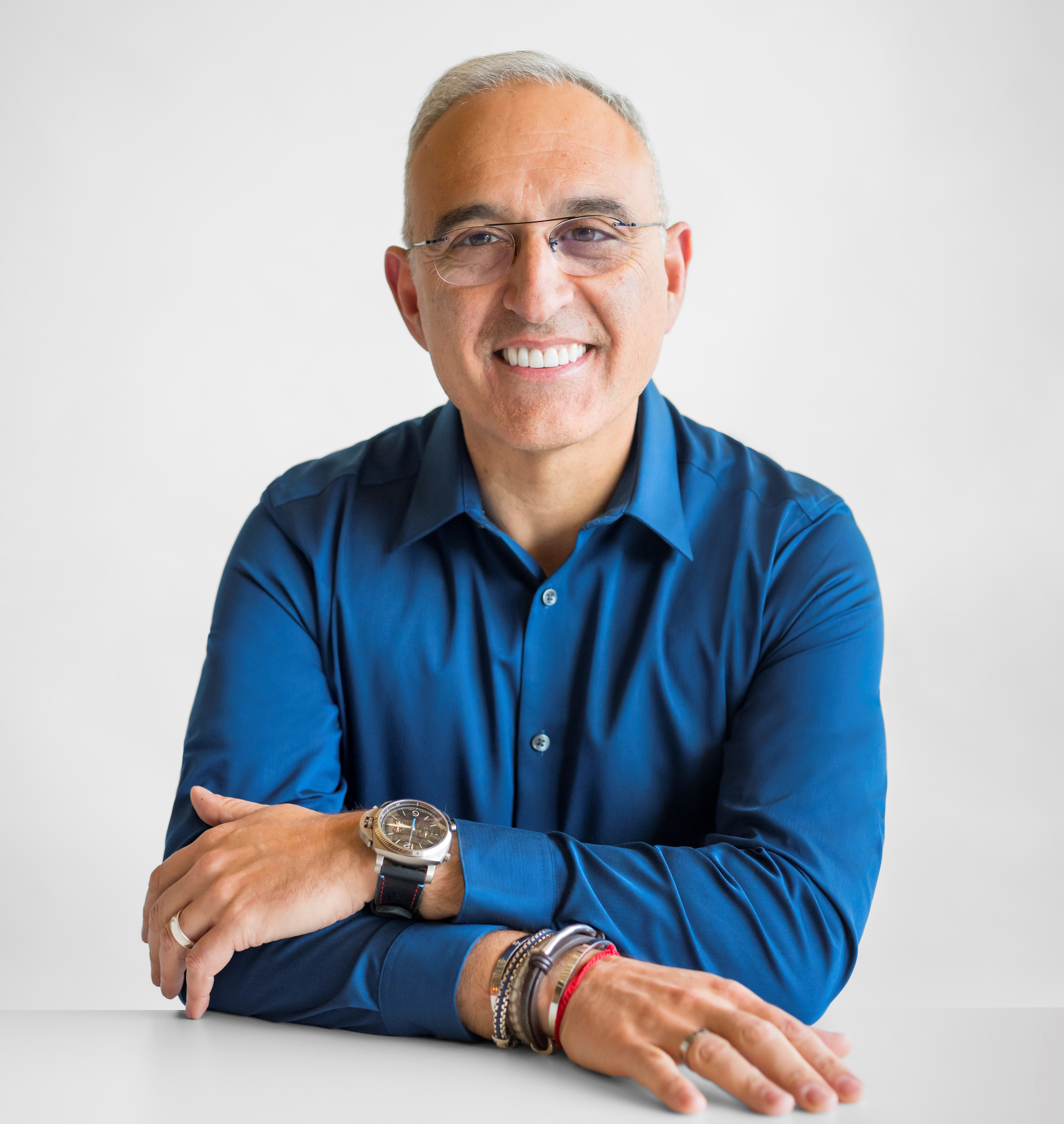
- Born: May 10, 1967 (age 59); Bahía Blanca, Argentina
- Citizenship: Argentine and American
- Education: Universidad Tecnológica Nacional
- Employer: Hewlett Packard Enterprise
- Title: President and CEO of Hewlett Packard Enterprise
- Predecessor: Meg Whitman
- Board member of: Hewlett Packard Enterprise
- Children: 2

Antonio Neri (born May 10, 1967) is an Argentine-Italian-American businessman who currently serves as president and chief executive officer (CEO) of Hewlett Packard Enterprise (HPE). Born in Argentina, he studied engineering at National Technological University and started working for Hewlett-Packard in 1995. Neri joined HPE's board of directors upon his promotion to the president and CEO position in 2018.

== Early life and education ==
Neri was born in the port city of Bahía Blanca, Argentina, on May 10, 1967. His parents were Italian immigrants to Argentina both from Sicily. He became interested in electronics and technology as a teenager. Neri began military education and training at the age of 15, becoming an engineering apprentice for the Argentine Navy and working to repair ships' radar and sonar systems at the Port Belgrano Naval Base. He remained with the navy during his time at the Escuela Nacional de Educación Técnica and the National Technological University, where he continued to study engineering.

Neri also studied art in Argentina for nine years and has taught art, specializing in drawing and painting.

== Career ==
Early in his career, Neri left Argentina to work for a small information technology company in Italy. He started working in Hewlett-Packard's (HP) customer service department in Amsterdam in 1995. Six months later, he was promoted to a support engineer position; subsequently he became an education manager, call center manager, and services manager for Europe. In 1997, he relocated to Boise, Idaho, to serve as global director of HP's imaging and printing services division. Neri moved to Houston in 2004 to work for the company's PC services business, then began heading the technology services business in 2011.

Prior to HP's split into Hewlett Packard Enterprise (HPE) and HP Inc. in 2015, he served as senior vice president and general manager for the company's server and networking units. In 2015, Neri became executive vice president and general manager role of HPE's business division, called Enterprise Group, and focused on marketing strategy, new product development, and research and development. During his tenure as HPE's first president, which began in June 2017, Neri worked to streamline the company's businesses and served as interim chief sales officer. He replaced Meg Whitman to become the company's first Latino chief executive officer (CEO) in February 2018, and joined the board of directors.

Neri has been credited for spearheading several of the company's technologies, including the Apollo HPC portfolio and Superdome X, which CRN described as "the world's most scalable in-memory compute platform". He has also been credited with helping the company acquire Aruba Networks, Nimble Storage, Silicon Graphics International, and SimpliVity, and helping to define HPE's scope during the split from HP. Neri designed the interior of the company's headquarters in San Jose, California. Neri's "Next Initiative" has been described as a "massive reimagining" of the company; the strategy has reduced HPE's number of stock keeping units by 75 percent, as well as the number of management levels, and works to increase innovation. He has also focused on edge computing, modernizing the company's information technology, and increasing HPE's cultural and gender diversity.

== Personal life ==
During his tenure with HP, Neri lived in Europe and Latin America before relocating to the United States. He and his wife met at an HP call center and were married in the late 1990s. They have two children, and became U.S. citizens in 2012. Neri lives in The Woodlands, TX, where he plays recreational soccer for the VS team. He purchased a residence in Delray Beach, Florida, in 2019. He speaks four languages: Dutch, English, Italian, and Spanish. His hobbies include painting and watching football.
