= XDB =

XDB may refer to:

== Software ==
- xBase (xDB) - a family of database management systems and related programming languages
  - Xbase (formerly known as XDB) - a software library from the xBase family
  - XDB Enterprise Server - a historical product from the xBase family
- Oracle XML DB - an Oracle Database feature

== Other ==
- Gare de Lille Europe (XDB IATA code) - a railway station and an international airport in Lille, France.
