= HP Client Automation Software =

Software

Radia Client Automation software, formerly HP Client Automation software
- Developers: Accelerite, a fully owned subsidiary of Persistent Systems, formerly from Hewlett-Packard, HP Software Division
- Stable release: 10.0
- Operating system: Microsoft Windows, Linux, Mac, iOS, Android
- Type: Client automation software tools
- License: Proprietary
- Website: Radia Unified Endpoint Management web page

Radia Client Automation software is an end-user device (PC and mobile device) lifecycle management tool for automating routine client-management tasks such as operating system deployments and upgrades, patch management, application software deployment, application use monitoring, security, compliance, and remote system management.

In February 2013, Hewlett-Packard (HP) and Persistent Systems, Inc. agreed to an exclusive license for Persistent to access the HP Client Automation technology. Persistent is now developing the Radia Client Automation product line, based on the original HP Client Automation products. HP is also selling the Radia Client Automation products from Persistent.

== History ==
Radia Client Automation has been called various names in its life-cycle: HP OpenView Configuration Management software, Radia Enterprise Desktop Manager (EDM), and HP Client Automation Software.

- 1992 - Novadigm launches Enterprise Desktop Manager (EDM)
- 1997 - Novadigm launches Radia
- 2004 - HP acquires Novadigm
- September 2004 - Version 4.0 Radia released
- April 2007 - Version 5.0 HP OpenView Configuration Management released
- October 2007 - Version 5.1 HP Configuration Management released
- July 2008 - Version 7.20 HP Client Automation released
- May 2009 - Version 7.50 HP Client Automation released
- Dec 2009 - Version 7.80 HP Client Automation released
- June 2010 – Version 7.90 HP Client Automation released
- Feb 2011 - Version 8.10 HP Client Automation released
- Jan 2013 - Version 9.00 HP Client Automation released
- Feb 2013 - Persistent Systems Ltd. enters into a strategic agreement with Hewlett-Packard (HP) to license its HP Client Automation (HPCA) software.
- June 2013 - Persistent Systems delivers on HPCA licensing agreement, launches Radia Client Automation at HP® Discover 2013

== Key Features ==
Radia Client Automation software can manage hundreds of thousands of client devices. It can be used to manage Microsoft Windows, Mac OS X and Linux desktops and laptops, mobile devices and tablets running iOS, Android and Windows 8 Series Mobile operating System, HP thin clients, and Windows and Linux servers.

Radia Client Automation uses a desired state management model where IT defines how it wants devices to look through a series of policies, while agents on client devices proactively synchronize and manage to that defined state. This model results in higher levels of compliance while at the same time significantly reducing the amount of effort needed to manage the environment. It is especially effective for notebook or laptop PCs because infrequent and lower-bandwidth connections can limit the effectiveness of task-based models that are commonly found across the industry.

The major features in the 9.00 release are:

- Mobile device (iOS, Android and Windows) support
- Management over the Internet
- Windows 8 support
- End-to-end IPv6 support
- Patch management for Adobe and Java software
- Target-wise role-based access control
