= Zerto =

American cybersecurity software company

- Type: Subsidiary
- Industry: Computer software
- Founded: 2009; 17 years ago
- Founder: Oded Kedem; Ziv Kedem
- Headquarters: Spring, Texas
- Key people: Ziv Kedem (CEO); Amir Idar (VP of Engineering)
- Products: Zerto, Zerto Cyber Resilience Vault, Zerto Backup for SaaS
- Parent: Hewlett Packard Enterprise
- Website: zerto.com

Zerto provides disaster recovery, ransomware resilience and workload mobility software for virtualized infrastructures and cloud environments. Zerto is a subsidiary of Hewlett Packard Enterprise company which is headquartered in Spring, Texas, USA.

== History ==
Ziv Kedem, Zerto's founder and CEO, previously co-founded Kashya. Zerto has received investments from venture capital firms such as 83North (formerly Greylock IL), Battery Ventures, Harmony Partners, RTP Ventures, IVP, and USVP. In 2016, the company was ranked #45 on the Deloitte Fast 500 North America list.

Zerto was bought by Hewlett Packard Enterprise in 2021 for $374 million.

== Products ==
Zerto simplifies the protection, recovery, and mobility of on-premises and cloud applications. Zerto’s simple, software-only solution uses continuous data protection at scale to solve for ransomware resilience, disaster recovery and data mobility across private, public, and hybrid deployments. Zerto supports VMware, Hyper-V, AWS, Microsoft Azure, IBM Cloud, Google Cloud, Oracle Cloud, and more than 350 managed service providers.

Zerto provides disaster recovery software for virtualized and cloud infrastructures. The company's original product, Zerto Virtual Replication, was released in August 2011. The technology leverages 'hypervisor-based replication', which moves data replication up the server stack from the storage layer into the hypervisor.

Zerto Backup for SaaS powered by Keepit introduced in 2021 provides a simple cloud backup built on the world’s only secure cloud dedicated to SaaS data protection and includes support for Microsoft 365, Salesforce, Google Workspace, Zendesk, Microsoft Power BI, Microsoft Dynamics, and Microsoft Active directory.
