= Silver Peak Systems =

American computer networking company

Silver Peak Systems, Inc.
- Type: Private
- Industry: Networking hardware, software
- Founded: 2004; 22 years ago, in California
- Defunct: 2020; 6 years ago
- Fate: Acquired by Hewlett Packard Enterprise
- Successor: Aruba Networks
- Headquarters: Santa Clara, California
- Area served: Worldwide
- Key people: David Hughes (CEO); Eric Yeaman (CFO); John Vincenzo (CMO); Chris Helfer (SVP Sales); Damon Ennis (SVP Products)
- Website: silver-peak.com

Silver Peak Systems, Inc. was a company that developed products for wide area networks (WANs), including WAN optimization and SD-WAN (Software-Defined WAN). The company was founded in 2004 by David Hughes. Silver Peak shipped its first product, the NX-series hardware appliance, in September 2005, and their first SD-WAN solution, EdgeConnect, in June 2015.

On July 13, 2020, Hewlett Packard Enterprise announced its intent to acquire Silver Peak for $925 Million. This acquisition was completed on September 21, 2020, with Silver Peak becoming part of HPE subsidiary Aruba Networks.

== Products and services ==
As of 2019, Silver Peak's major product lines were:

- WAN optimization
  - NX series network appliances
  - VX series virtual appliances
  - GMS Global Management System — Management software for NX and VX
- Unity
  - Unity EdgeConnect — Physical and virtual appliances for SD-WAN implementation
  - Unity Boost — Optional WAN optimization package
  - Unity Orchestrator — Management software/service, available as a virtual appliance, cloud-hosted, or Software as a service (SaaS) subscription

== Partnerships ==
=== Dell ===
Before their acquisition, Silver Peak was a Dell partner for WAN optimization in over 30 countries, where Dell resold Silver Peak to improve the performance of Dell storage (EqualLogic and Compellent), networking (Force10), server, and virtual desktop (VDI) implementations over the wide area network.

=== VMware ===
Silver Peak partnered with VMware to offer its virtual WAN optimization products as part of the VMware vCloud Air offering.

=== EMC ===
EMC Corporation resold Silver Peak physical and virtual WAN optimization appliances, which were available through the EMC Select program. Silver Peak was also the only WAN optimization product qualified and integrated with EMC’s VPLEX Geo. Silver Peak’s WAwan optimization products were E-lab qualified on Symmetrix Remote Data Facility/Asynchronous (SRDF/A), Symmetrix Remote Data Facility/Data Mobility (SRDF/DM), SAN Copy, Celerra Replicator, Isilon SyncIQ, RecoverPoint, and Atmos.

=== Hitachi Data Systems ===
Hitachi Data Systems (HDS) resold Silver Peak's WAN optimization products. Silver Peak can be deployed with HDS backup and replication products.

== See also ==
- WAN optimization
- Virtual appliance
