= IManager =

Server configuration utility

iManager
- Screenshot of iManager
- Developer: Micro Focus
- Stable release: iManager 3.1.1
- Operating system: Unix-based
- Type: File manager
- Website: support.securesites.com/support/virtual/admin/imanager/

iManager is a web-based console for authentication and access management, distributed by Micro Focus. It enables secure access network administration tools and content.

A configuration manager for Unix-based servers, iManager can be downloaded to various operating systems including Linux and Windows, and is available with Open Novell Enterprise Server software.
