= Hewlett Packard Enterprise =

American information technology company

Hewlett Packard Enterprise Company
- Logo used since June 2025

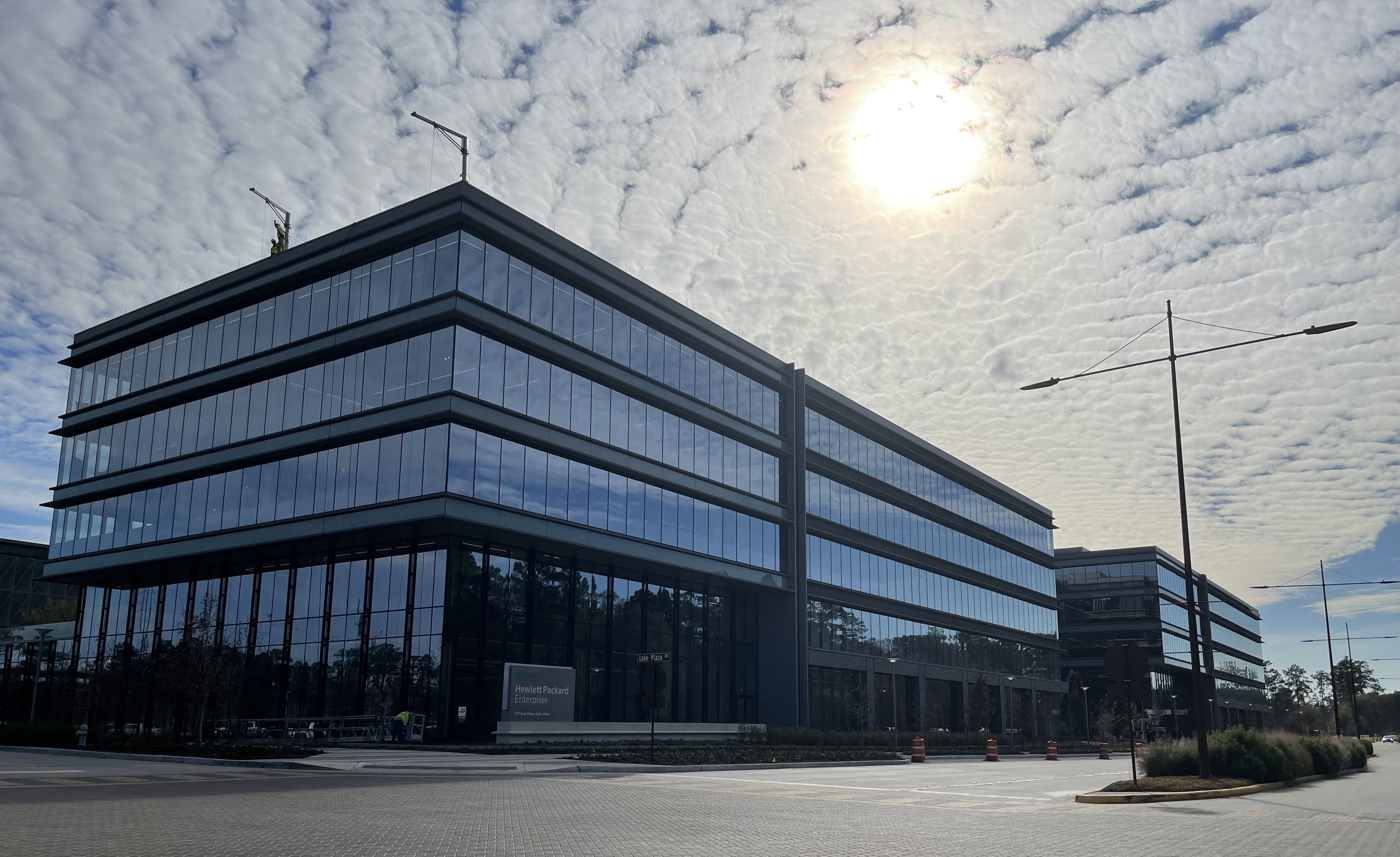
- Headquarters in Spring, Houston, Texas
- Type: Public
- Traded as: NYSE: HPE; S&P 500 component
- Industry: Information technology
- Predecessor: Hewlett-Packard
- Founded: November 1, 2015; 11 years ago in San Jose, California
- Headquarters: Spring, Houston, Texas, U.S.
- Area served: Worldwide
- Key people: Patricia Russo; (chairwoman); Antonio Neri; (president and CEO)
- Products: Financial technology; Computer hardware; Computer software; Cloud computing; Internet of Things (IoT); Artificial intelligence; Computer networking
- Services: Consulting
- Revenue: ▲US$34.3 billion (2025)
- Operating income: ▼US$−437 million (2025)
- Net income: ▼US$57 million (2025)
- Total assets: ▲US$75.9 billion (2025)
- Total equity: ▼US$24.7 billion (2025)
- Number of employees: 67,000 (2025)
- Divisions: Intelligent Edge; HPC & MCS; Compute; Storage; Financial Services; Hewlett Packard Labs
- Subsidiaries: Aruba Networks; Cray; Juniper Networks; Zerto; Silver Peak Systems; Axis Security; Athonet
- Website: hpe.com
- Footnotes; Financials as of October 31, 2025.

The Hewlett Packard Enterprise Company (HPE) is an American multinational information technology company based in Spring, Texas. It is a business-focused organization which works in servers, storage, networking, AI, containerization software and consulting and support. In 2026, Hewlett Packard Enterprise ranked No. 133 on the Fortune 500 list of the largest United States corporations by total revenue.

HPE was founded on November 1, 2015, in Palo Alto, California, as part of the splitting of the Hewlett-Packard company. The split was structured so that the former Hewlett-Packard Company would change its name to HP Inc. and spin off Hewlett Packard Enterprise as a newly created company. HP Inc. retained the old HP's personal computer and printing business, as well as its stock-price history and original NYSE ticker symbol for Hewlett-Packard; Enterprise trades under its own ticker symbol: HPE. At the time of the spin-off, HPE's revenue was slightly less than that of HP Inc. The company relocated to Texas in 2020.

In 2017, HPE spun off its Enterprise Services business and merged it with Computer Sciences Corporation to become DXC Technology. Also in 2017, it spun off its software business segment and merged it with Micro Focus. Also in 2024, as part of the change in strategy, HPE's telecommunications business unit, the Communication Technology Group (CTG), was acquired by HCLTech for $225 million. In 2026, HPE worked with a conservative fixer to have anti-trust regulators in the US Department of Justice fired for not giving approval to a controversial 2025 $14 billion merger with Juniper.

== Naming ==
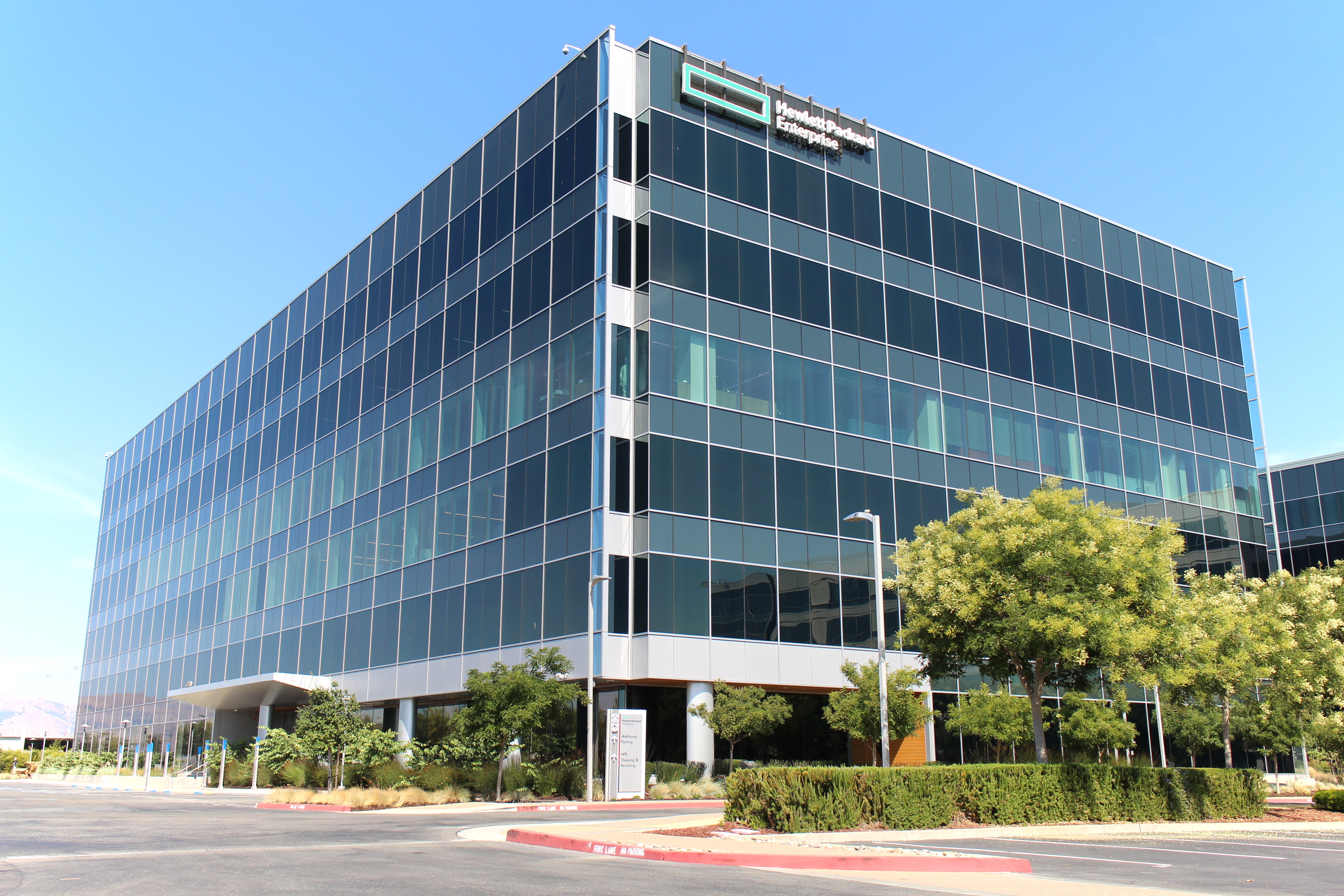
HPE campus in San Jose, California

The full name for the company is "Hewlett Packard Enterprise Company", which drops the hyphen that previously existed between the "Hewlett" and "Packard" of the former Hewlett-Packard Company. The company is commonly referred to as "Hewlett Packard Enterprise" or by its initials "HPE".

The company has also been referred to as "HP Enterprise" by some media outlets and has even been incorrectly referred to as "HP Enterprises".

== History ==
Logo used from November 2015 to June 2025

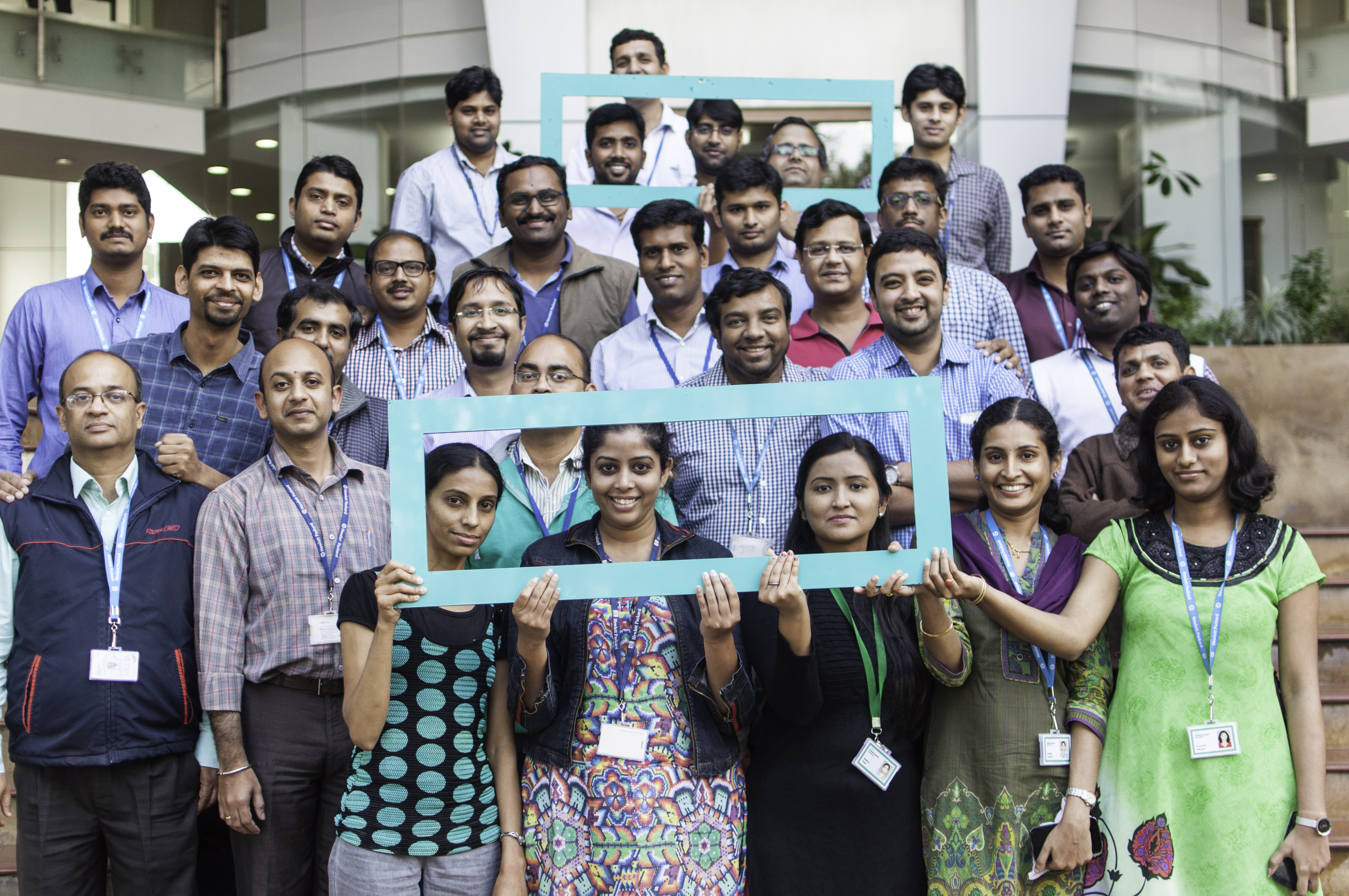
IT service management employees hold up the new company's logo rectangle in 2015.

In May 2016, the company announced it would sell its enterprise services division to one of its competitors, Computer Sciences Corporation in a deal valued at US$8.5 billion. The merger of HPE Enterprise Services with CSC, to form a new company DXC Technology, was completed on March 10, 2017. Approximately 100,000 current HPE employees were affected. More than 30,000 services employees from other areas of the HPE business remained at HPE including technology services support and consulting as well as software professional services.

In August 2016, the company announced plans to acquire Silicon Graphics International (SGI), known for its capabilities in high performance computing. On November 1, 2016, HPE announced it completed the acquisition, for US$7.75 per share in cash, a transaction valued at approximately US$275 million, net of cash and debt.

On September 7, 2016, HPE announced a "spin-merge" with Micro Focus, who would acquire HPE's "non-core" software (which included the HP Autonomy unit), and HPE shareholders would own 50.1 percent of the merged company, which would retain its current name. The merger concluded on September 1, 2017.

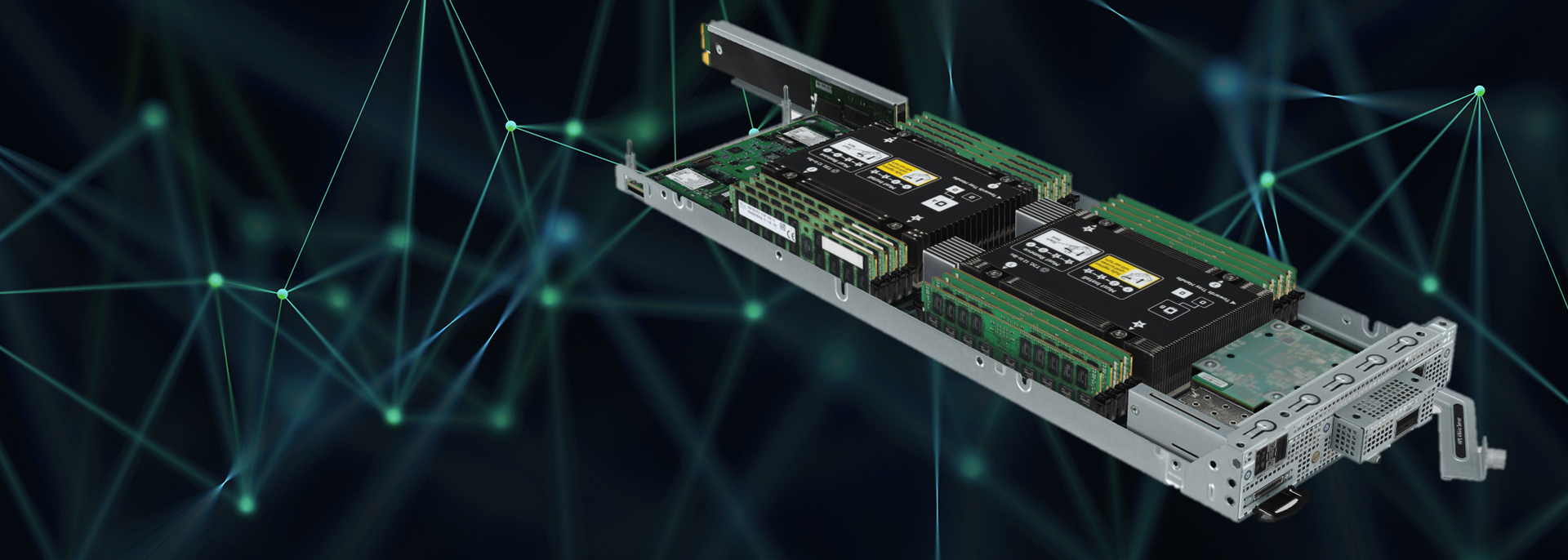
High-performance processor test bed built by HPE for the Oak Ridge Leadership Computing Facility in 2018

In September 2016, Hewlett Packard Enterprise transferred two patents to Texas-based wholly owned shell company Plectrum LLC. These two patents were originated at 3Com Corporation, which was bought by HP in 2010, along with about 1,400 patents.

On April 11, 2017, it was reported that Synack had raised US$21 million in a round of funding that included Hewlett Packard Enterprise.

In January 2017, the company acquired data management platform SimpliVity, the developer of the OmniCube hyper-converged infrastructure appliance, for US$650M.

In April 2017, Hewlett Packard Enterprise completed its acquisition of hybrid flash and all flash manufacturer, Nimble Storage Inc, for US$1.2 billion or US$12.50 per share. In October, Reuters reported that the company had allowed a Russian defense agency to examine a cyber-defense system used by The Pentagon. The report noted: "Six former U.S. intelligence officials, as well as former ArcSight [Hewlett Packard Enterprise] employees and independent security experts, said the source code review could help Moscow discover weaknesses in the software, potentially helping attackers to blind the U.S. military to a cyber attack."

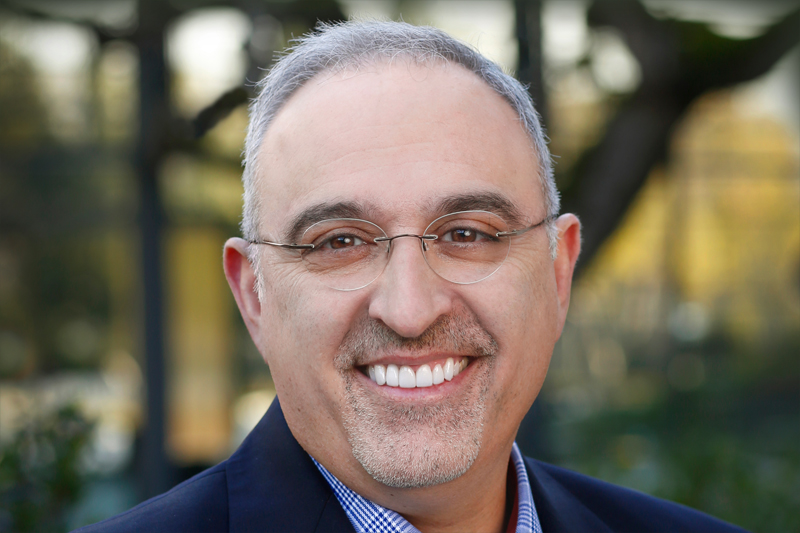
Antonio Neri, President and CEO as of 2018

In November 2017, Meg Whitman announced that she would be stepping down as CEO, after six years at the helm of HP and HPE, stating that, on February 1, 2018, Antonio Neri would officially become HPE's president and chief executive officer. The announcement created controversy leading to a 6% drop in stock price, which quickly recovered during the next few days.

In June 2018, Hewlett Packard Enterprise launched a hybrid cloud service called GreenLake Hybrid Cloud, built on top of HPE's OneSphere cloud management SaaS console, offered under its brand HPE GreenLake. GreenLake is designed to provide cloud management, cost control, and compliance control capabilities, and will run on AWS and Microsoft Azure. GreenLake includes cloud data services for containers, machine learning, storage, compute, data protection and networking through a management portal called GreenLake Central.

In February 2019, Meg Whitman announced she would not be seeking re-election to the board of directors, ending her professional involvement in HPE.

In May 2019, Hewlett Packard Enterprise announced plans to acquire Cray Inc for US$35 per share. The announcement came soon after Cray had landed a US$600 million US Department of Energy contract to supply the Frontier supercomputer to Oak Ridge National Laboratory in 2021. The acquisition was completed in September 2019 in a transaction valued at approximately US$1.4 billion.

In December 2020, Hewlett Packard Enterprise disclosed it is relocating its corporate headquarters from San Jose, California, to Spring, Texas, a northern suburb of Houston. From December 2021 to April 2022, HPE headquarters was located at the former HP property and headquarters campus of Compaq in northwest Harris County near SH 249 and Louetta. Designed by architecture studio Pickard Chilton, the new Springwoods Village campus in Spring was completed in early 2022. Concerns about major flooding at the Compaq complex were a contributing factor for HPE CEO Antonio Neri to have the new campus built. The old campus had previously been flooded by Hurricane Harvey in 2017. In April 2022, HPE relocated from the Compaq complex to its recently finished Spring campus, coinciding with the sale of the former complex to Mexican beverage distributor Mexcor that month.

HPE's proposed $14 billion acquisition of Juniper Networks was subjected to an investigation by the UK's antitrust watchdog, the Competition and Markets Authority. On June 19, 2024, the Competition and Markets Authority announced that it had initiated a merger inquiry to assess potential competition concerns arising from the deal, setting an August 14, 2024 deadline to decide whether to conduct a full investigation. At the time the deal was announced, HPE had agreed to pay $40 per share in cash for Juniper. In January 2025, the US Department of Justice Antitrust Division filed an antitrust lawsuit against HPE to block its acquisition of Juniper Networks, alleging that the proposed deal would raise prices, harm competition, and reduce innovation. Following a settlement with the DOJ, in which HPE agreed to divest its Instant On wireless division and license the source code for Juniper's Mist AI (a key component of Juniper's WLAN products), the acquisition was completed on July 2, 2025. Later that month, Axios reported that the U.S. Intelligence Community had earlier directly intervened to persuade DOJ to allow the acquisition, arguing that blocking the merger would have harmed U.S. companies and strengthened Chinese competitors—particularly Huawei—framing the decision as critical to national security. In September 2025, attorneys general from 20 states voiced support of further investigation in a letter to the courts. The letter proposed that the acquisition may not be in the best interest of the public.

To help HPE with the Juniper merger, HPE hired conservative lobbyist Mike Davis to receive a favorable decision by the second Donald Trump administration. Davis had helped Trump to staff key figures in anti-trust roles in the administration, including Gail Slater, the head of the US Department of Justice Antitrust Division. According to sworn deposition by Roger Alford, a deputy in the Justice Department’s antitrust division, Davis threatened Slater unless she approved a settlement deal related to HPE’s $14 billion bid to acquire rival Juniper. Slater and her team were resistant to approving the settlement, as the proposed settlement did not alleviate anti-competition concerns. Shortly thereafter, Slater and her deputies were forced out of the Justice Department.

== Corporate affairs ==
The company's headquarters is in Houston, in a limited purpose annexation area.

=== Operating segments ===
- Intelligent Edge (10% of FY20 revenue) – offers platforms designed for network security, including Aruba Networks and Silver Peak Systems
- HPC & MCS (11% of FY20 revenue) – High Performance Compute and Mission Critical Systems. Also includes Hewlett Packard Labs
- Compute (44% of FY20 revenue) – the core server business
- Storage (17% of FY20 revenue) – the core storage business, including recent acquisition Zerto
- HPE Financial Services (12% of FY20 revenue) – provides financing services for HPE customers and partners
- A&PS (4% of FY20 revenue) – Advisory and Professional Services through 'HPE Pointnext'.
- Corporate Investments (2% of FY20 revenue) – includes 'HPE Pathfinder' (HPE's venture capital arm) and the Communications Technology Group

CEO Antonio Neri announced in 2019 that he expects all products to be sold 'as a service' by 2022 via HPE Greenlake.

=== Finances ===
The key trends for Hewlett Packard Enterprise are (as of the financial year ending December 31):

Year	Revenue in million USD	Net income in million USD	Assets in million USD	Employees
2015	31,077	2,461	79,916	
2016	30,280	3,161	79,629	
2017	28,871	344	61,406	66,000
2018	30,852	1,908	55,493	60,000
2019	29,135	1,049	51,803	61,000
2020	26,982	(322)	54,015	59,400
2021	27,784	3,427	57,699	60,400
2022	28,496	868	57,123	60,200
2023	29,135	2,025	57,153	62,000
2024	30,127	2,554	71,262	61,000

=== Ownership ===
HPE is mainly owned by institutional investors, who hold around 88% of all shares. The 5 largest shareholders in mid-2025 were:

- Vanguard Group (169,804,055 shares held)
- BlackRock (137,553,957 shares held)
- Capital World Investors (73,552,085 shares held)
- Bank of America (51,846,776 shares held)
- JPMorgan Chase (47,124,039 shares held)

== Products ==
- Intelligent Edge: Aruba Networks, Silver Peak Systems, FlexFabric
- HPC & MCS: Apollo (High-Performance Computing), Cray
- Compute: HP XP, HPE GreenLake Hybrid Cloud, Edgeline, Cloudline, Synergy, OneView, OneSphere, ProLiant, Synergy, Cloudline, Edgeline, HPE Integrity Servers, NonStop, HPE Superdome, Apollo (High-Performance Computing), Simplivity (HyperConvergence)
- Storage: HPE 3PAR, StoreOnce, StoreEver, HP XP, HPE GreenLake Hybrid Cloud, HPE Alletra, HPE Primera, MSA, Nimble & Alletra dHCI
- Communications Technology Group: OpenCall and Service Activator

== Criticism ==
=== Israeli subsidiaries ===
In 2023, during the ongoing Gaza war, HP and Hewlett Packard Enterprise (HPE) were criticised because products from Hewlett-Packard Israel were provided to the Israel Police, the Israel Prison Service and the Israel Population and Immigration Authority. The BDS movement called on consumers and organisations to boycott all HPE IT services and products, as well as the printers, computers and printer cartridges of HP Inc. In 2025, Hewlett Packard Enterprise was identified in a report by the Office of the United Nations High Commissioner for Human Rights that listed companies facilitating the occupation of Palestine — it states:

"Before IBM, Hewlett Packard Enterprises (HPE) maintained the database and its Israeli subsidiary is still providing servers. Hewlett Packard (HP) has long enabled the apartheid systems of Israel, supplying technology to the Coordination of Government Activities in the Territories (COGAT), the prison service and police. Since the 2015 split of the company into Hewlett Packard Enterprises and HP Inc., opaque business structures have obscured the roles of their seven remaining Israeli subsidiaries."

== Acquisitions ==
Company acquired	Date of acquisition	Business	Country	Price
Aruba Networks	March 2, 2015	Network hardware	US	$3B
Rasa Networks	May 6, 2016	Wireless network analytics	US	N/A
Silicon Graphics International (SGI)	August 11, 2016	Hardware and software	US	$275M
SimpliVity	January 17, 2017	Hyperconverged infrastructure	US	$650M
Cloud Cruiser	January 23, 2017	Cloud consumption analytics	US	N/A
Niara	February 1, 2017	Network security	US	N/A
Nimble Storage	April 17, 2017	Storage	US	$1.2B
Cloud Technology Partners	September 5, 2017	Cloud services	US	N/A
Cape Networks	March 27, 2018	Network security	South Africa	N/A
RedPixie	April 10, 2018	Cloud consulting	UK	N/A
Plexxi	May 15, 2018	Software-defined networking	US	N/A
BlueData	December 18, 2018	Software	US	N/A
MapR	August 5, 2019	Software	US	N/A
Cray	September 25, 2019	Hardware and software for supercomputers	US	$1.4B
Scytale	February 3, 2020	Web Security	US	N/A
Silver Peak Systems	September 21, 2020	SD-WAN	US	$925 million
Cloud Physics	February 24, 2021	Infrastructure assessment	US	N/A
Determined AI	June 21, 2021	Software	US	N/A
Zerto	July 1, 2021	Software	Israel	$374 million
Ampool	July 7, 2021	Software	US	N/A
Pachyderm	January 12, 2023	Data Versioning and Pipelines	US	N/A
Athonet	February 24, 2023	Private 5G	Italian	N/A
Axis Security	March 2, 2023	Cloud based Security Software(SSE, SASE)	Israel	$500 million
Opsramp	March 20, 2023	IT operations management	US	N/A
Morpheus Data	August 30, 2024	Cloud management Software	US	N/A
Juniper Networks	July 2, 2025	Network hardware, AI network operations, Cloud Management	US	$14B

Note: Aruba Networks was acquired by the Hewlett-Packard Company before demerger and was inducted into Hewlett Packard Enterprise while demerging.

== Carbon footprint ==
HPE reported Total CO2e emissions (Direct + Indirect) for the twelve months ending 30 September 2020 at 343 Kt (-48 /-12.4% y-o-y). The company commits to reduce emissions by 55% by 2025 from 2016 base year, and this science-based target is aligned with the Paris Agreement to limit global warming to 1.5 °C above pre-industrial levels.

HPE's annual Total CO2e Emissions - Location-Based Scope 1 + Scope 2 (in kilotonnes)
Sep 2015	Sep 2016	Sep 2017	Sep 2018	Sep 2019	Sep 2020	Sept 2021
580	642	412	448	391	343	306

== Company culture ==
HPE has received many employer awards, such as 2025 Fortune 100 Best Companies to Work For and 2025 PEOPLE Companies That Care. HPE manages industry-leading career development programs such as global intern and graduate cohorts, Technical Career Path, Professional Career Path, Leadership Development, and Executive Advantage.

== See also ==
- List of networking hardware vendors
- HP Inc. – the demerged sibling company that offers printers and personal computers.
- HP Release Control
- Hewlett Packard Labs – the research & development arm of Hewlett Packard Enterprise.
