= Digitek =

American system software company

Digitek was an early system software company located in Los Angeles, California, United States.

Digitek, co-founded in 1961 by three equal partners (James R. Dunlap, President plus Vice Presidents Donald Ryan and Donald Peckham who had worked together at Hughes Aircraft Company, in Culver City, California), authored many of the programming language systems (compiler + runtime + intrinsic library) on various manufacturers' computer systems, including IBM, SDS, and many others. In the 1960s Digitek advertised frequently in Scientific American and Datamation magazines.

Digitek dissolved when taken to task by GE for failing to deliver a promised PL/I compiler for the Multics project. Don Peckham was bought out. With Dave McFarland, also from Digitek, Don Ryan founded Ryan−McFarland which continued the compiler writing work.

== History ==
Digitek's first compiler customer was Scientific Data Systems (SDS), a computer mainframe hardware company founded by Max Palevsky in 1961 and later acquired by Xerox in 1969.

Digitek wrote language systems for almost every popular programming language at the time including FORTRAN, PL/I, SIMSCRIPT, COBOL, and BASIC. Digitek compilers included the IBM System 360 G Level FORTRAN. Due to their implementation in a virtual machine technology called POPS (for "Programmed Operators"), the company's compilers could be developed rapidly and had a common "footprint". This later allowed a successor company, Ryan-McFarland Corporation, to capitalize on the rapid expansion of the microcomputer market in the late 1970s and early 1980s by providing POPS-based compilers to virtually all of the emerging computer vendors at the time. Among these products were RM/COBOL and RM/BASIC for Tandy's TRS-80, and IBM Professional FORTRAN (and its twin, RM/FORTRAN) for MS-DOS. Ryan-McFarland was sold to an Australian company (Austec) in 1987, and the POPS-based compiler technology was subsequently sold to Language Processors, Inc. (later renamed Liant Software Corporation). Liant was purchased by Micro Focus International in 2008, where the technology, in the form of the RM/COBOL-85 compiler and runtime system, is being sold. In 2020, applications built using this POPS implementation of COBOL are still in widespread use throughout the world.

Lahey Computer Systems F77L was also a POPS-based Fortran 77 compiler, for MS-DOS. Don Ryan, Thomas M Lahey, Doug Ahl, Noel Vasquez, David McFarland, and Jack Perrine (developer of Univac 1108 Fortran V and Athena Fortran) had all worked at Digitek at the same time.
