= NetIQ =

Cybersecurity software product line

- Type: Subsidiary
- Industry: Computer software
- Founded: 1995; 31 years ago, in San Jose, California, U.S.
- Fate: Acquired by The Attachmate Group (July 5, 2006)
- Headquarters: San Jose, California, United States
- Key people: Jay Gardner (president and GM)
- Parent: OpenText
- Website: www.netiq.com

NetIQ is a security software company. In 2023 it was acquired by OpenText.

NetIQ was previously based in San Jose, California, with products that provide identity and access management, security and data center management. Its flagship offerings are NetIQ AppManager, NetIQ Identity Manager and NetIQ Access Manager.

OpenText has owned NetIQ since 2023 after its acquisition of Micro Focus, which acquired The Attachmate Group, which acquired NetIQ in 2006, six years after the latter acquired Mission Critical Software.

== History ==
NetIQ was founded by Ching-fa Hwang, Her-daw Che, Hon Wong, Ken Prayoon Cheng and Tom Kemp in September 1995; AppManager was introduced in 1996. Their February 2000 merger with Mission Critical Software widened the company's focus to include systems management as well as performance.

In 2001, NetIQ acquired Webtrends, whose software "monitors corporate Internet traffic." — which they sold in 2005.

In 2006, NetIQ was acquired by AttachmateWRQ, After that company acquired Novell in 2011, it changed its name to The Attachmate Group. NetIQ added identity and security products as well as data center and virtualization to their offerings. It was the Attachmate acquisition that led to the alignment of NetIQ products into three categories:

- identity and access management,
- security management and
- data center management.

In 2014, The Attachmate Group was merged into Micro Focus International. NetIQ also announced the use of an Identity Manager number 4.5.
