= 3PAR =

Manufacturer of systems and software for data storage and information management

3PAR Inc.
- Type: Subsidiary
- Industry: Data storage
- Founded: 1999; 27 years ago
- Founder: Jeffrey Price; Ashok Singhal; Robert Rogers
- Headquarters: Fremont, California, U.S.
- Key people: David C. Scott (president, CEO & director)
- Revenue: US$194.28 million (FY10)
- Operating income: US$ -3.33 million (FY10)
- Net income: US$ -3.18 million (FY10)
- Total assets: US$212.30 million (FY10)
- Number of employees: 657 (FY10)
- Parent: Hewlett Packard Enterprise

3PAR Inc. was a manufacturer of systems and software for data storage and information management headquartered in Fremont, California, USA. 3PAR produced computer data storage products, including hardware disk arrays and storage management software. It became a wholly owned subsidiary of Hewlett-Packard after an acquisition in 2010. In 2015, HP's enterprise assets, including 3PAR, were spun off into Hewlett Packard Enterprise.

== History ==
3PAR was founded in mid-1998 or 1999, originally called 3PARdata. The founders included Jeffrey Price and Ashok Singhal, the P and A in the company's name. The R stands for a third partner, Robert Rogers, who left the company in 2001. David Scott became president and CEO in January 2001.

3PAR first shipped the InServ storage server in September 2002. 3PAR's primary competitors in the enterprise storage market are Dell EMC, Pure Storage, NetApp, Hitachi Data Systems and IBM. 3PAR called itself a pioneer of thin provisioning, a mechanism to improve the utilization efficiency of storage capacity deployment. 3PAR first announced this capability in June 2002 and shipped it to customers in 2003.

An investment round of almost $33 million was disclosed in February 2004. Investors included Mayfield Fund, Menlo Ventures and Worldview Technology Partners. In September 2007, 3PAR opened a second research and development office in Belfast, Northern Ireland. The company completed an initial public offering in November 2007 and was initially listed on the NYSE Arca exchange under the symbol PAR. In the same month, 3PAR introduced Virtual Domains, which allow for secure application data isolation on a consolidated multi-tenant storage platform. In December 2008, 3PAR moved to the NYSE Big Board. One year later, 3PAR opened an Indian subsidiary in Bangalore focused on providing logistical and administrative support for its Global Services and Support operations. In March 2010, the company introduced 3PAR Adaptive Optimization, the industry's first implementation of autonomic storage tiering for cost optimization in high-end storage systems, targeted at enterprises and service providers. In April 2010, the company was recognized by Forbes magazine as the fourth fastest growing technology company in its Tech25 list.

== Takeover bids ==
On August 16, 2010, Dell announced that it would acquire 3PAR in a transaction valued at approximately $1.15 billion, net of 3PAR's cash.

Following that, on August 23, 2010, Hewlett-Packard Company (HP) announced it had offered $1.5 billion (30% higher than Dell's offer) to acquire 3PAR in a letter sent to 3PAR's president and CEO.

On August 26, 2010, 3PAR said it accepted Dell's revised offer for a price of $24.30 per share, or approximately $1.6 billion, net of 3PAR's cash.

Then on August 27, both parties re-offered their bids, with Dell offering $27 a share to buy 3PAR, and HP offering $30 only 90 minutes later, valuing the company at more than $2 billion.

On September 2, 2010, Dell increased its offer to $32 per share but declined to revise its bid after HP upped its bid to $2.4 billion or $33 per share shortly thereafter. Dell received a $72 million break-up fee from 3PAR for the termination of the initial merger agreement.

On September 27, 2010, HP completed the acquisition for $2.35 billion. In 2015, 3PAR became part of Hewlett Packard Enterprise.

== Products ==
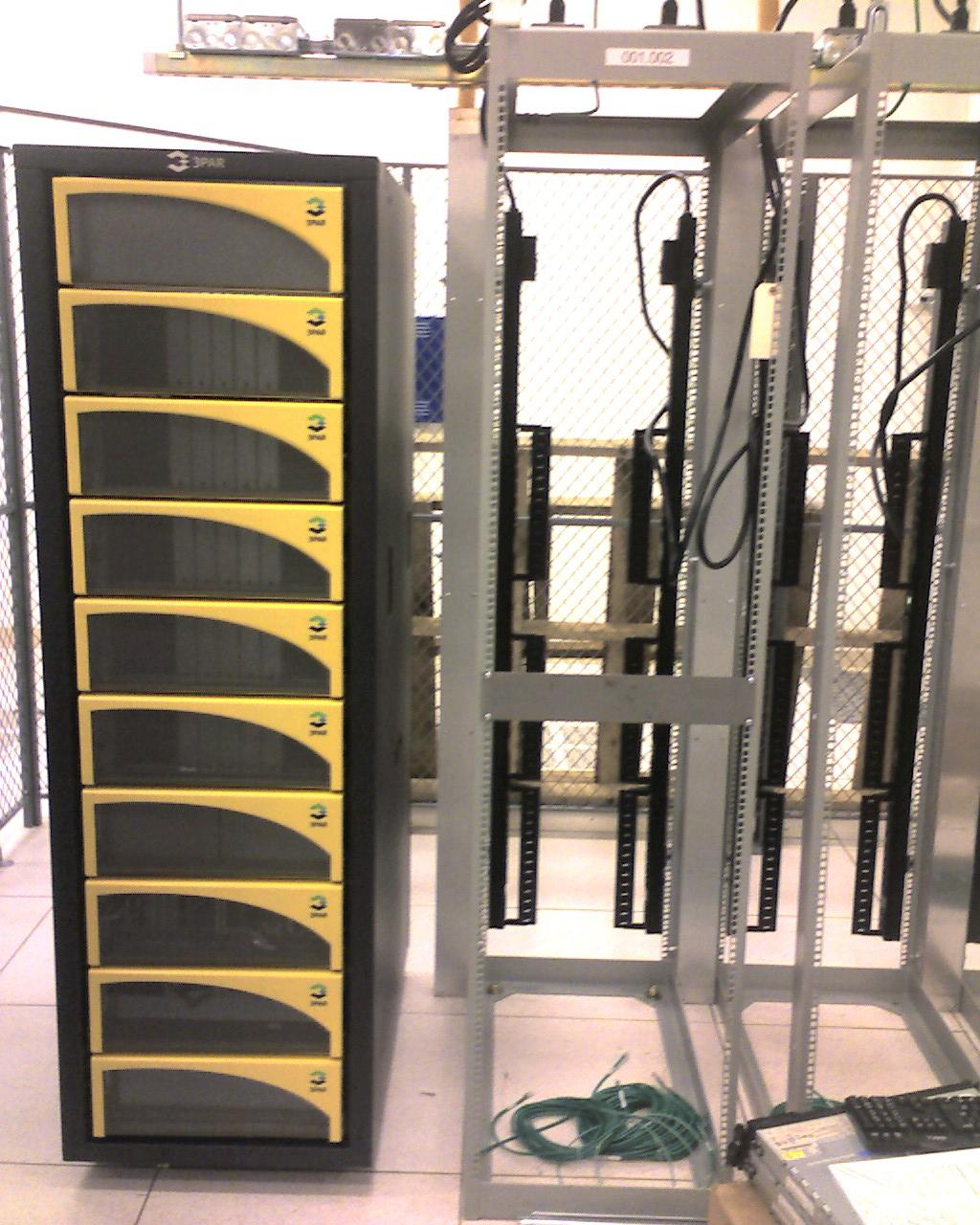
A 3PAR storage device in 2007

3PAR promoted what it called "utility storage", designed to be the storage foundation for utility computing architectures. Utility computing architectures provide a multi-tenant platform on which service providers can deliver both virtualized and scalable enterprise IT as a utility service. The emergence of software as a service (SaaS), infrastructure as a service (IaaS) and social networking business models deployed via the internet and cloud computing are examples of this trend. Enterprises and government organizations that are turning their IT organizations into internal service bureaus by building shared virtualized infrastructures for flexible workload consolidation are another.

In 2005, 3PAR's InServ storage server was marketed for business data centers. It included the models T400 and T800 which compete with high-end monolithic storage arrays like the EMC DMX and HDS USP, and the models F200 and F400 which compete with modular storage arrays like the EMC CX and HP EVA.

The current range of HPE 3PAR products consists of the 8000, 9000, and 20,000 series. The 8000 series was introduced in 2015 as a mid- range offering, available in both flash and hybrid variations. The high end 20,000 series was also introduced in 2015 and scales to 8 nodes, this can be scaled even further by using a federation. Most recently the 9000 series was introduced in 2017 which sits in between the 8000 and 20,000 series, scaling up to 4 nodes.

Common across all 3PAR models is the architecture based around the ASIC. The current ASIC version is Gen5 and enables functionality such as compression, thin provisioning and parity calculations. Also common across all 3PAR models is the 3PAR OS software, 3PAR OS 3.3.1 enhanced data reduction capabilities with the introduction of compression and enhancements to dedupe.
