= WinRunner =

HP WinRunner
- Developer: HP/Mercury Interactive
- Final release: 9.2
- Operating system: Microsoft Windows
- Type: Test automation
- License: Proprietary
- Website: HP Functional Testing software web page

WinRunner is an automated functional GUI testing tool that allows a user to record and play back user interface (UI) interactions as test scripts.

As a functional test suite, it works with HP QuickTest Professional and supports enterprise quality assurance. It captures, verifies and replays user interactions automatically, in order to identify defects and determine whether business processes work as designed.

The software implemented a proprietary Test Script Language (TSL) that allowed customization and parameterization of user input.

WinRunner was originally written by Mercury Interactive in 1993. Mercury Interactive was subsequently acquired by Hewlett Packard (HP) in 2006. On February 15, 2008, HP Software Division announced the end of support for HP WinRunner versions 7.5, 7.6, 8.0, 8.2, 9.2—suggesting migration to HP Functional Testing software as a replacement.

== See also ==
- List of GUI testing tools
