= HPE Service Activator =

HPE Service Activator is a service provisioning and activation software platform from Hewlett Packard Enterprise. Once installed and integrated with a Customer Service Provider's (CSP) environment, HPESA automates the processes inherent in the creation and activation of new telecommunications services. It is not specific to any network or service type and can apply across fixed, mobile, or internet environments. HPESA software is activation-centric, but engages the entire fulfillment stack as defined by the TeleManagement Forum's Business Process Framework (eTOM) framework, including order management, resource inventory and service activation.

The core of the platform is a highly scalable workflow engine that executes activation-oriented workflows, and is designed to support various plug-ins that control activation targets in a CSP's network and IT service infrastructure - regardless of the protocol used for the activation. Open, standards-based architecture allows HPSA to be integrated with content partner activation systems and other OSS/BSS software.

== History ==
HP Service Activator was originally developed in 2000 as an Internet Data Center solution in Spain. In 2001, it transitioned to HP Service Activator under the purview of the HP Communications, Media and Entertainment (CME) group within the Consulting & Integration organization (now under Hewlett Packard Enterprise's Communications Technology Group). HP Service Activator software was formerly branded HP OpenView Service Activator (OVSA), but HP has since retired the name OpenView from use. In 2004, it re-launched as a global CSP Activation solution. As of 2021, HPE offers Service Activator 9.0 with HPESA 7.0 reaching end of service life in December 2022.

== Solutions ==
The core platform may be implemented alone or in conjunction with one or more HPSA solutions. The solutions, which are built as customizations on top of HPSA, are service-specific and pre-packaged from field-developed IP to accelerate deployment time. They include:

• HP Service Activator Solution for VPN Services (HPSA-VPN) - Layer 2 and Layer 3 Virtual Private Network (VPN) services

• HP Service Activator Solution for Metro Ethernet (HPSA-ME) - Layer 2 Virtual Private LAN Services

• HP Service Activator Solution for Residential IP Services (HPSA-RIPS) - Multi-play residential services delivered over an IP infrastructure

• HP Service Activator Solution for Managed Services (HPSA-MSS) - Managed Services for VoIP, Wireless LAN and Security

== Technical data ==
HP Service Activator Software runs on HP-UX, Sun Solaris (operating system), Linux (Only some certified distributions), and Microsoft Windows Server 2003. Standards supported include: OSS through Java (OSS/J) interfaces, web-services and XML/SOAP.
