= Express Metrix =

IT software

Express Metrix, LLC
- Type: Privately held
- Industry: IT asset management software
- Founded: September 2000
- Headquarters: Seattle, Washington, United States
- Products: Express Software Manager; Express Inventory; Express Meter
- Website: expressmetrix.com

Express Metrix was a provider of IT asset management software used for PC hardware and software inventory, license management, and software metering. Express Metrix was based in Seattle, Washington, and its software was deployed on more than two million desktop computers worldwide. It was acquired by Cherwell Software of Colorado Springs, Colorado, in 2014.

== Company history ==
Express Metrix grew out of a division of WRQ, Inc. (now Attachmate) called Express Systems. In September 2000, a group of WRQ executives purchased the Express Systems product line from WRQ and formed Express Metrix.

== Products ==
- Express Software Manager is an IT asset management suite that integrates PC inventory, purchasing data, software usage tracking, and application control. The suite includes Express Inventory and Express Meter.
- Express Inventory is a hardware and software inventory product that provides a summary of all hardware and software installed across the PC desktop and server environment.
- Express Meter is a software metering product that allows companies to track software usage across their networks, as well as restrict access to applications that are concurrently licensed or pose a risk to security or productivity.
