= HP Release Control =

Enterprise software product

HP Release Control is an enterprise level software product which is a part of HP IT Performance Suite.

== Overview ==
In a typical release life cycle, after a change enters the system, the change goes through an approval, implementation, and review phase. HP Release Control supports each one of these phases in the release life cycle.

=== Approval ===
During the approval phase, the Analysis module provides a detailed analysis of each change request in the system. Change Advisory Board (CAB) members can view information such as the potential impact of the change and the possible risk involved in implementation. The CAB uses this information to make more informed and accurate decisions regarding the approval of planned changes. In addition, the collaboration feature enables CAB members to provide feedback about planned changes, and to approve or reject the changes.

=== Implementation ===
During implementation, the Director and Implementor modules provide real-time information regarding change activities. Implementors and release teams are able to monitor the status of all change activities on a 24-hour timeline view. They receive alerts about issues such as scheduling, collisions, and delays, and use the implementation guidelines that were drawn up in the Analysis module during the approval phase.

=== Review ===
After implementation, the Post Implementation Review (PIR) feature provides a platform for reviewers to present their conclusions regarding the implemented change. Using information collected during the implementation phase, reviewers provide feedback about the overall success of the change and satisfaction levels of relevant parties.

=== Management and Administration ===
During the entire release life cycle, IT managers use the HP Release Control Dashboard module to view graphic displays of change request and activity data in real time. HP Release Control Administrators use the Administration module to configure the HP Release Control properties and perform administration tasks in the system.
