= The Attachmate Group =

Defunct software holding company

The Attachmate Group, Inc.
- Type: Private
- Industry: Computer software
- Defunct: November 20, 2014; 11 years ago
- Fate: Merged with Micro Focus International
- Headquarters: Houston, Texas, United States
- Area served: Worldwide
- Key people: Jeff Hawn (chairman and CEO); Charles Sansbury (COO and CFO)
- Revenue: US$1.2 billion (2010)
- Number of employees: 4,000
- Parent: Micro Focus
- Subsidiaries: Attachmate; NetIQ; Novell
- Website: www.attachmategroup.com

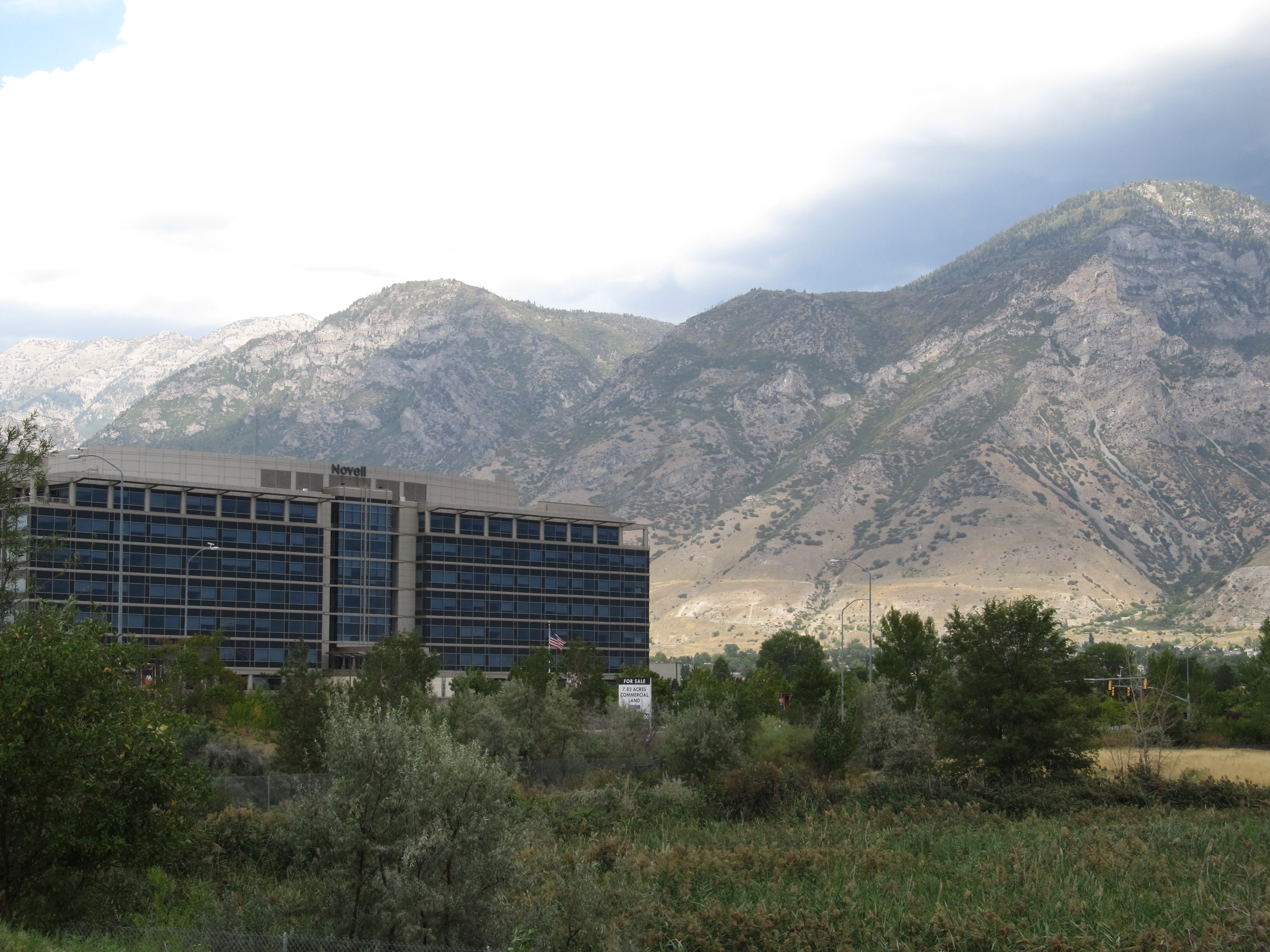
The Novell building in Provo, Utah, in 2013 during the Attachmate Group era

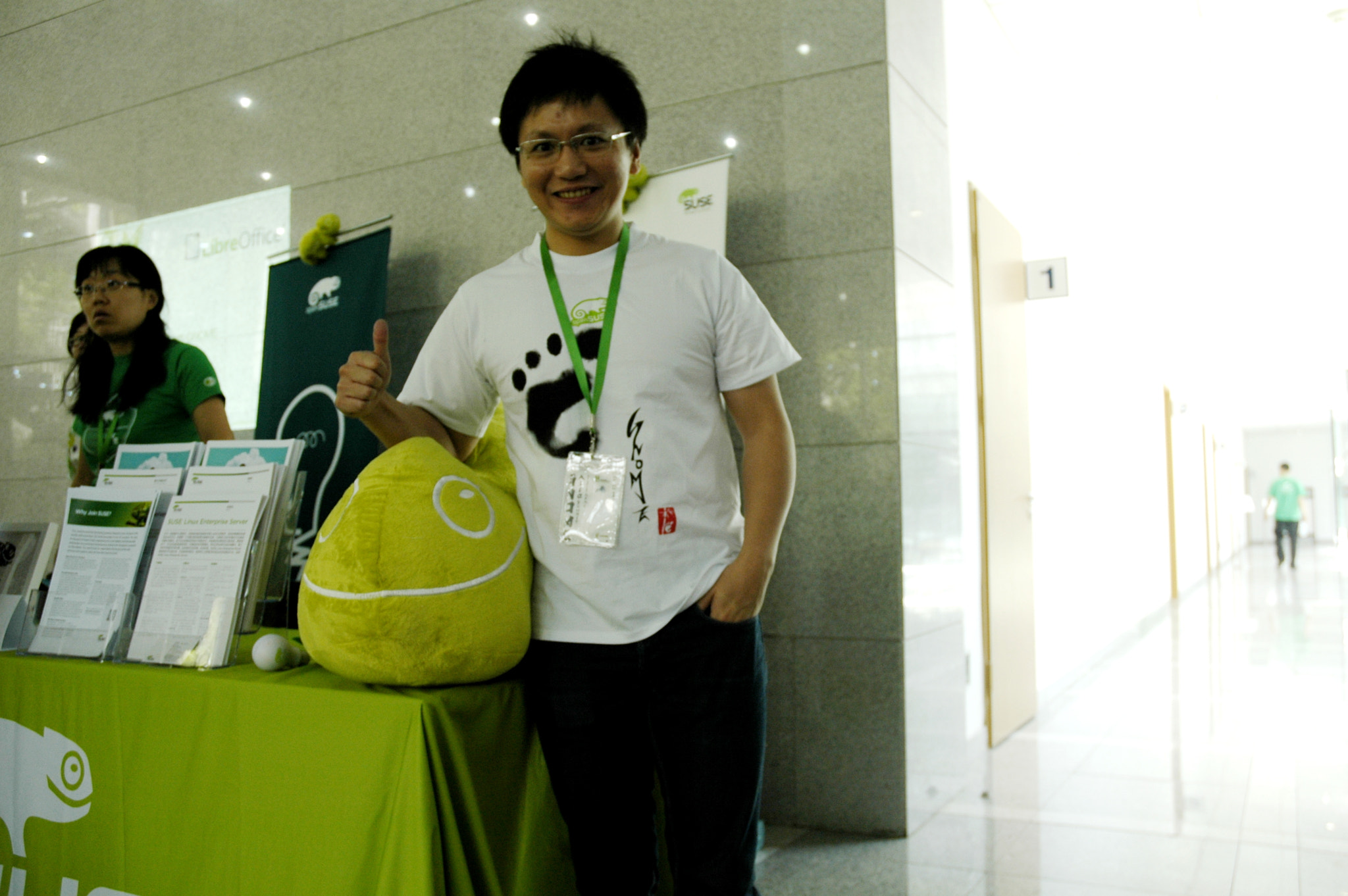
SuSE employees at a Beijing conference, in 2014 during the Attachmate Group era

The Attachmate Group, Inc. was a privately held software holding company based in Houston, Texas in the United States. The major companies held by the group were Attachmate, NetIQ, Novell, and SUSE.

Attachmate was owned by Wizard Parent LLC—an investment group consisting of Elliott Management Corporation, Francisco Partners, Golden Gate Capital, and Thoma Bravo.

== History ==
=== WRQ and Formation ===
In 1981, Doug Walker, Mike Richer and Marty Quinn founded Walker, Richer & Quinn (WRQ) to integrate microcomputers with existing IT environments. The company set its sights on the Hewlett-Packard market, launching the first commercially viable terminal emulator for the HP 3000. (Two subsidiaries, Express Metrix and NetMotion Wireless, had been spun off by WRQ in 2000 and 2001, respectively, and continued to operate successfully for years to come.)

After buying both WRQ, Inc. and Attachmate Corporation, who had been long-time competitors in the host emulation business, the private equity firms announced that the companies would be merged. On June 1, 2005, the deal closed, and it was revealed that the two companies, merged into one, would be named AttachmateWRQ.

=== NetIQ ===
NetIQ, founded in 1995 by Ching-Fa Hwang, Her-daw Che, Hon Wong, Ken Prayoon Cheng and Thomas R. Kemp, was a company that provided systems management and security management software. Their products included AppManager and Security Manager.

On April 27, 2006, AttachmateWRQ announced an agreement to acquire NetIQ On July 5, 2006, both companies released a press release announcing the closing of the deal. The new company would do business under the name Attachmate Corporation.

=== OnDemand ===
In 2006, AttachmateWRQ acquired OnDemand Software, developer of WinINSTALL, a product similar to AttachmateWRQ's existing NetWizard product.

Two years later Scalable Software acquired the WinINSTALL business unit (substantially all assets of the former OnDemand) from Attachmate.

=== Wollongong ===
Later, the company also acquired The Wollongong Group (makers of Pathway TCP and Emissary).

=== Novell ===
In 2011, Attachmate acquired Novell, Inc and let go hundreds of Novell employees.

Novell subsequently operated as two separate business units under the Novell and SUSE brand names and joined Attachmate and NetIQ as holdings of The Attachmate Group. Certain intellectual property assets were planned to be sold to CPTN Holdings, a consortium of companies led by Microsoft.

=== Acquisition by Micro Focus ===
On 15 September 2014, the British firm Micro Focus International announced that it would acquire the Attachmate Group for US$1.2 billion in shares, and Attachmate Group announced entering into a definitive agreement to merge with Micro Focus, with transaction to be closed in 2014-11-03. Wizard Parent LLC was estimated to hold a 40% stake in Micro Focus following the acquisition.

In 2014-11-05, Micro Focus International announced the completion of its merger with the Attachmate Group.

In 2015-04-05, Micro Focus announced the completion of integrating Attachmate Group of companies that had been merged in 2014-11-20. During the integration period, the affected companies had been merged into a single organization. In the announced reorganization, NetIQ and Novell products would be part of Micro Focus portfolio. SUSE was sold to EQT AB in 2019.
