= NetMotion Software =

Network security software vendor

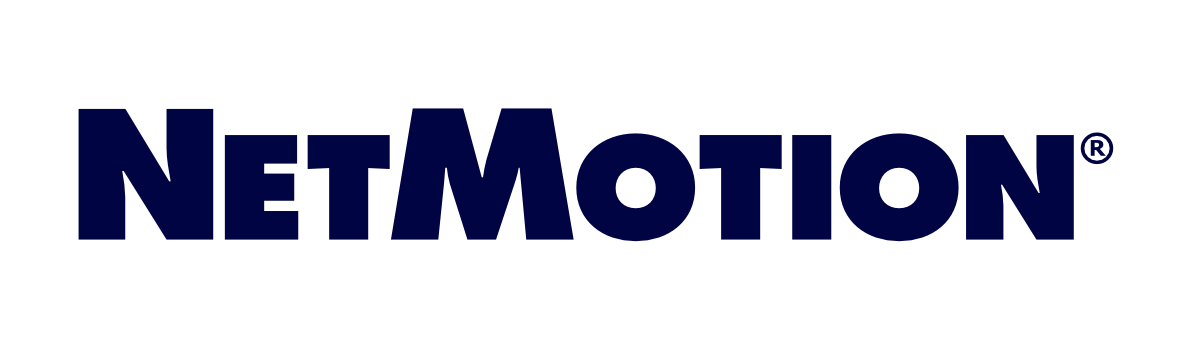
- Type: Subsidiary
- Industry: Computer software technology services
- Founded: Seattle, Washington (2001)
- Headquarters: Seattle, Washington
- Products: Virtual private network, Digital experience monitoring; Software-defined perimeter; Zero trust network access
- Number of employees: ~190
- Parent: Absolute Security
- Website: www.netmotionsoftware.com

NetMotion Software, formerly NetMotion Wireless, was a privately held software company specializing in network security.

== History ==
NetMotion Wireless was formed in 2001 as a spin-off for wireless software from WRQ (based in Seattle, Washington and later part of the Attachmate Group). Former WRQ president Craig McKibben was CEO.

- 2006: NetMotion merged with Padcom, Inc.
- 2012: NetMotion was acquired by Clearlake Capital Group.
- 2016: NetMotion was acquired by The Carlyle Group, with a new CEO.

In 2021, NetMotion was acquired by Absolute Security for an estimated US$340 million.

NetMotion is headquartered in Seattle, Washington with offices in Chicago, London, Tokyo and Sydney. The company added a second headquarters in Victoria, British Columbia in 2019.

== Products ==
NetMotion products allow users to transition from traditional secure remote access technologies to a zero-trust approach, without affecting productivity or admin controls. Fundamentally, it consists of client software on each mobile device, which communicates with a control server in the cloud or data center that pushes policies and actions to the client for execution. Through this architecture that gives administrators control of the endpoints, they can manage application delivery based on changing network conditions through software, regardless of the combination of networks used, including cellular and Wi-Fi networks that are outside of their direct administrative control.

An enhanced filtering feature named Aware was added in 2019. In July, 2020, a new release of the software added the term software-defined perimeter (SDP). In late 2020, NetMotion’s products were marketed with the term secure access service edge.
