= OpenText Data Protector =

Automated backup and recovery software

- Developer: OpenText
- Stable release: 24.1
- Operating system: Microsoft Windows, UNIX, Linux
- Type: Backup and recovery software
- License: Proprietary
- Website: Data Protector software web page

Data Protector software (originally Omniback) is automated backup and recovery software for single-server to large hybrid enterprise environments, supporting disk storage, tape and cloud storage targets. It provides cross-platform, online backup of data for Microsoft Windows, Unix, and Linux operating systems. The last version to use the OmniBack name was version 4.1, which was retired in 2004.

== History ==
When Hewlett-Packard acquired Apollo Computer in 1989, the latter had already developed a backup system entitled the "OmniBack Network Backup System," which was available on the market at the time. HP continued to develop this product under the "OmniBack" name for the purpose of backing up individual files and raw disk partitions. A related but distinct product "OmniBack/Turbo" was developed for backing up databases.

In 1996 HP released OmniBack II 2.0 and merged OmniBack II and OmniBack/Turbo into a single product, although it was still impossible to create a single job which would contain a database and a file system backup. It was offered for $3,800. A Windows NT port was released with version 2.3. Version 2.55 was released in 1997 and included support for HP-UX and IBM AIX.

With version 5.0, the OmniBack name was dropped. Since then, the product has been called HP Openview Storage Data Protector and HP StorageWorks Data Protector, or commonly just HP Data Protector.

HP announced the release of HP Data Protector 9.0 (as a part of its Adaptive Backup & Recovery initiative) in May 2014. It was released in July 2014 along with two companion products: HP Data Protector Management Pack and HP Backup Navigator.

Micro Focus acquired HPE Software in 2017, and was renamed Micro Focus Data Protector. In 2022 a family member called Data Protector for Cloud Workloads (DP4CW) was added to the Suite addressing protection of cloud native applications like M365 but also various hypervisors like OpenShift, KVM, Nutanix, ProxMox and Kubernetes.

OpenText acquired Micro Focus in 2023, and was renamed OpenText Data Protector. With DP Version 25.4 (an LTS release) additional security features and usability improvements plus enhancements for the built in deduplication technology as well as new native SAP HANA integration were added.

Today's version of Data Protector provides full backwards compatibility with its predecessors.
