= Silicon Graphics International =

2009–2016 computing company, formerly Rackable Systems

Silicon Graphics International Corp.
- Type: Public
- Traded as: Nasdaq: RACK; Nasdaq: SGI
- Industry: Diversified computer systems
- Founded: 1999; 27 years ago, San Jose, California (Rackable Systems, Inc.)
- Defunct: November 1, 2016; 10 years ago
- Fate: Acquired by Hewlett Packard Enterprise
- Headquarters: Milpitas, California, U.S.
- Key people: Jorge Titinger, President and CEO; Cassio Conceicao, Executive Vice President and COO; Eng Lim Goh, CTO; Bob Nikl, CFO
- Products: High performance computing, big data analytics, petascale storage solutions
- Services: Professional and managed services
- Website: www.sgi.com

Silicon Graphics International Corp. (SGI; formerly Rackable Systems, Inc.) was an American manufacturer of computer hardware and software, including high-performance computing systems, x86-based servers for datacenter deployment, and visualization products. The company was founded as Rackable Systems in 1999, but adopted the "SGI" name in 2009 after acquiring Silicon Graphics Inc. out of bankruptcy.

On November 1, 2016, Hewlett Packard Enterprise completed its acquisition of SGI for $275 million.

== History ==
=== Rackable Systems, Inc. era ===

Rackable Systems Inc., founded in 1999, had risen by 2004 to number 4 in IDC's rankings of x86-based server manufacturers. The company went public in June 2005, with a business model described at that time as taking "a no-frills approach to x86 servers and then [focusing on] customers looking for large quantities of systems." 6.25 million shares were offered at $12 per share.

In 2006, Rackable acquired Terrascale Technologies, a company developing scalable storage software technology.

On April 1, 2009, Rackable announced an agreement to acquire Silicon Graphics, Inc. for $25 million. The purchase, ultimately for $42.5 million, was finalized on May 11, 2009; at the same time, Rackable announced its adoption of "SGI" as its global name and brand. The following week, the company changed its NASDAQ stock ticker symbol from "RACK" to "SGI".

=== Silicon Graphics International Corp. era ===
The "new" SGI began with two main product lines: servers and storage continuing from the original Rackable Systems; and servers, storage, visualization and professional services acquired from Silicon Graphics, Inc. At the time of the acquisition's completion, SGI said that it anticipated the survival of the majority of the two companies' product lines, although some consolidation was likely in areas of high overlap between products.

After the acquisition, the "classic" SGI logo was briefly revived to link to the web pages for the former Silicon Graphics, Inc. product line.

In 2010, SGI announced the purchase of all the assets and assumed a limited amount of liabilities of COPAN Systems. COPAN was a provider of storage archive products for real-time access to long-term persistent data. COPAN products were offered as part of the SGI storage line.

In 2011, SGI acquired all outstanding shares of SGI Japan, Ltd. The same year, the company announced the acquisition of OpenCFD Ltd. In December, the company announced Mark J. Barrenechea's resignation as president, chief executive officer and member of the board of directors. He was reported to have joined Open Text Corporation. Shortly thereafter, it was announced that Barrenechea had agreed to continue to serve on the SGI board.

In February 2012, it was announced that Jorge Luis Titinger would become SGI's president and chief executive officer.

In 2013 SGI acquired FileTek, Inc.

In 2015, a Silicon Graphics International employee claimed that "several hundred pounds of documents of 68k and MIPS era stuff" inherited from the old SGI, dating back to the mid-1980s, had been destroyed in 2010.

On August 11, 2016, it was announced that Hewlett Packard Enterprise would acquire SGI for $7.75 per share in cash, a transaction valued at approximately $275 million, net of cash and debt. The deal was completed on November 1, 2016.

== See also ==
- NUMAlink
