= HP OpenView Storage Area Manager =

HP OpenView Storage Area Manager (OVSAM) is a Hewlett-Packard software suite for management of storage resources and infrastructure.

HP OpenView Storage Area Manager provides comprehensive, centralized management across distributed, heterogeneous storage networks. The HP OpenView Storage Area Manager suite includes the following applications that share a common core services, GUI, host agent, and repository: Storage Node Manager (Device Management, Health/Status), Storage Optimizer (Performance), Storage Builder (Capacity), Storage Accountant (Chargeback/Metering), Storage Allocator (LUN Access Control)

HP Storage Essentials Enterprise Edition has effectively replaced HP OpenView Storage Area Manager in the HP Storage Management Software portfolio.

== Major releases ==
- HP OpenView Storage Area Manager 3.2, July 2004
- HP OpenView Storage Area Manager 3.1
- HP OpenView Storage Area Manager 3.0
- HP OpenView Storage Area Manager 2.2, February 2002
