= XDB Enterprise Server =

XDB Enterprise Server is a relational database management system (DBMS), which was available for DOS, Windows NT and OS/2, and it was compatible with IBM's DB2 database. The DOS version was released in 1988 as one of the earliest DOS-based SQL database servers. The system was developed by XDB Systems, Inc., which was acquired by Micro Focus International group in 1998. It is still shipped with Micro Focus' COBOL software.

== See also ==
- Comparison of relational database management systems
