= Serena Software =

American software company

Serena Software Inc.
- Type: Subsidiary
- Industry: Computer software, Application lifecycle management, IT management
- Founded: 1980; 46 years ago
- Founder: Doug Troxel
- Headquarters: San Mateo, California, U.S.
- Key people: Greg Hughes (CEO)
- Revenue: ▲US$219 million (2012)
- Number of employees: 400+
- Parent: OpenText
- Website: www.serena.com

Serena Software Inc. is an American software company that provides IT management products to enterprises. Serena solutions offer a process orchestration approach and span the areas of development, DevOps and IT management.

Serena is headquartered in Silicon Valley, California and has 400+ employees. The company became a subsidiary of the British software and information company Micro Focus in 2016. In 2023, Micro Focus (including Serena Software) was acquired by Canadian software company OpenText and remain a subsidiary.

== History ==
Serena Software acquired Merant Software in 2004 which provided Serena ownership rights to Polytron Version Control System (PVCS).

In May 2004, Serena announced it would acquire TeamShare, producers of the defect management system TeamTrack. This later became Serena Business Mashups (SBM), which was shortly renamed Serena Business Manager.

In November 2005, Serena Software announced that it had agreed to be acquired by Silver Lake Partners in a US$1.2 billion leveraged buyout transaction. The buyout was announced at a price of US$24 per share in cash, and the transaction occurred in 2006. Following the transaction, Silver Lake, a technology focused private equity firm acquired about 70% of the Serena stock. The Silver Lake Partners acquisition resulted in no immediate changes to the executive management team and daily operations continued much as they had before.

In October 2006, Serena announced the acquisition of Pacific Edge Software to enter the emerging project portfolio management (PPM) market. Mariner, a leading provider of Project and Portfolio Management (PPM) solutions was determined to be a good match for Serena's existing portfolio of products. After Pacific Edge, Serena made a number of more minor acquisitions, purchasing prototyping technology from Apptero, requirements management technology from Integrated Chipware and asset discovery technology from Data Sciences Corporation.

In September 2008 Serena announced the acquisition of Projity, an open source software as a service (SaaS)-based project management company.

John Nugent was appointed CEO in November 2009.

In November 2010, Serena announced a new strategy to orchestrate application delivery with a process-driven approach.

In January 2012, Serena's solutions for Orchestrated IT, Serena Service Manager (SSM) and Serena Release Manager (SRM) were named finalists for the Pink Elephant 2011 Innovation of the Year Award.

In February 2012, Serena Service Manager was named the winner of Pink Elephant's 2011 Innovation of the Year Award.

Greg Hughes was appointed CEO in January 2013.

During 2013 Serena tried to address falling profits and increase operating margins by reducing its workforce by some 175 employees, hoping to cut operating expenses for the fiscal year 2014. By July the company had total outstanding debt of US$410 million.

In March 2014, Serena announced the acquisition of the company by a partnership of founder Doug Troxel and private equity firm HGGC. The acquisition was completed in April 2014.

In March 22, 2016, Micro Focus announced its intent to acquire Serena Software, Inc., with acquisition expected to close in early May 2016, with transaction valued at US$540 million. In 2016-05-02, Micro Focus announced it has completed the acquisition.

== Products ==
The company provides process-based solutions for managing and automating application development, DevOps and IT operations. The company's revenues are generated through software licenses, maintenance contracts and professional services.

Serena's products and solutions address the following industry segments:

- Deployment automation (SDA)
- IT management
- Request management
- Demand management
- Requirements management (RM)
- Application lifecycle management (ALM)
- Release management (RLM)
- Agile development
- Configuration management (Dimensions CM)
- Issue & defect management
- IT service management (ITSM)
- Information technology operations (IT Operations)
- DevOps
- Product development
- Mainframe
