= HPE OpenCall =

- Developer: Hewlett Packard Enterprise
- Type: Telecommunications and network products
- License: Proprietary
- Website: www.hp.com/go/opencall

HPE OpenCall is a range of network and telephony products offered by the "Communications & Media Solutions" branch of technology company HPE. It is most commonly described as a suite of software and hardware applications which allow implementation of common telecom operator services such as voicemail, sms (short message service), prepaid, billing, hlr, etc. It implements industry standard telecom protocols and standards such as SS7, ISUP, TCAP, SIP, MRCP, RTSP, and VoiceXML.

== Products ==
The HPE OpenCall line of telecommunications platforms is offered by HPE Communications & Media Solutions organization in four main areas—media server, service and charging control, signaling, and subscriber mobility. The HPE OpenCall Media Platform is a voice and video server and media resource function platform used for developing and deploying messaging, portals and interactive services.

HPE offers three service and charging platforms for telecommunication service providers. They include HPE OpenCall Service Access Controller for prepaid and postpaid voice and data services; HP OpenCall Service Controller, an open platform for constructing multi-network-based services and developing applications in 2G and 3G architectures; and the HP OpenCall Intelligent Network Server used for operations like e911 on legacy wireline, wireless and next-generation communication systems.

There are three HPE OpenCall signaling platforms. The HPE Open IP Signaling Transfer Gateway that allows the convergence and delivery of advanced services for fixed, mobile and broadband networks. The HPE OpenCall SIP Network Server is an "all-in-a-box" Session Initiation Protocol network element for next generation and IMS networks, facilitating the deployment and growth of advanced telecommunication services. The HP OpenCall Universal Signaling Platform (USP) connects SS7 and IP SIGTRAN networks and provides a development environment for deploying, 2G, 2.5G and 3G services.

HPE Communications & Media Solutions markets three subscriber mobility products. The HPE Home Location Register and Home Subscriber Server (HLR/HSS) are used for subscriber management and new service deployment via a centralized system. The HP OpenCall Position Determination Entity is a location information platform that is used by emergency and commercial services to pinpoint a mobile terminal's position. The HPE OpenCall XML Document Management Server is used for deploying instant messaging and group communication services while shielding information privacy.

There are two subscriber policy offerings. The HPE OpenCall Home Subscriber Server is used to store and manage subscriber data when moving to next-generation networks. The HPE OpenCall Profile Manager connects user profile and service data for Web 2.0 services.
