= Nimble Storage =

Data storage hardware and software producer

HPE Nimble Storage
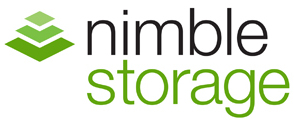
- Type: Subsidiary
- Industry: Information technology, data storage, solid state drives
- Founded: 2008
- Headquarters: San Jose, California, United States
- Key people: Varun Mehta, co-founder Umesh Maheshwari, co-founder and CTO; Suresh Vasudevan, CEO
- Products: AF-Series Predictive All Flash arrays: AF1000, AF3000, AF5000, AF7000, AF9000 CS-Series Adaptive Flash arrays: CS1000/H, CS3000, CS5000, CS7000
- Number of employees: 1000+
- Parent: Hewlett Packard Enterprise

Nimble Storage, founded in 2008, is a subsidiary of Hewlett Packard Enterprise. It specializes in producing hardware and software products for data storage, particularly data storage arrays that utilize the iSCSI and Fibre Channel protocols, and includes data backup and data protection features.

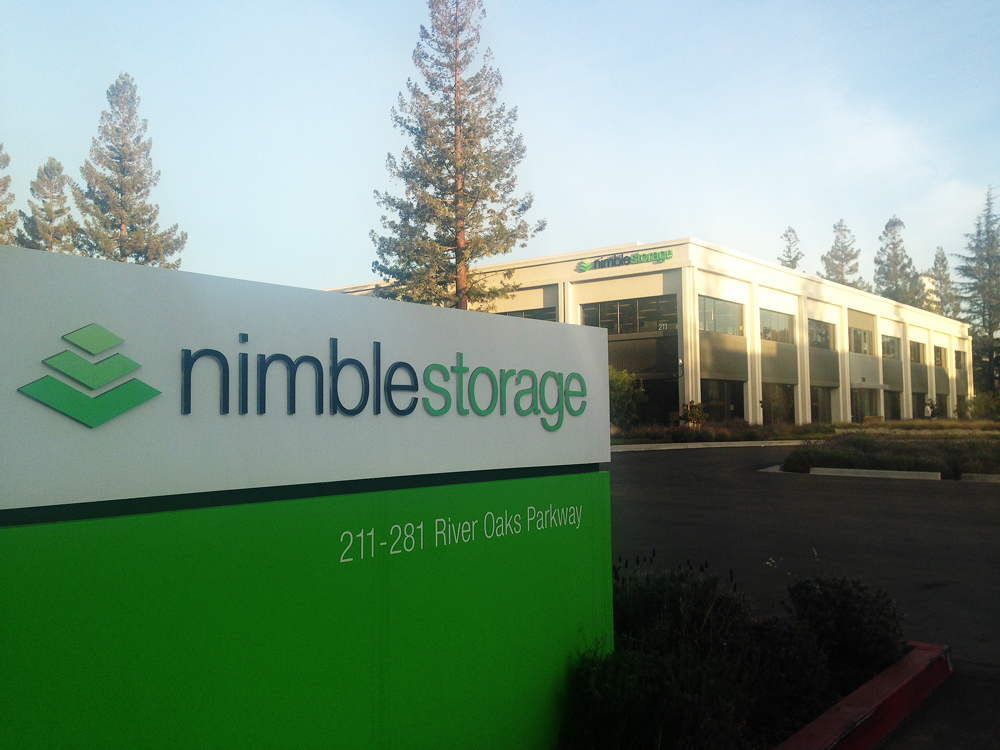
Dawn at Nimble Storage's campus in San Jose, California

== History ==
Nimble Storage was established in January 2008 by Varun Mehta and Umesh Maheshwari. In July 2010, the company announced its first product, the CS200 series hybrid arrays, at Tech Field Day.

In September 2012, Nimble Storage secured $40.7 million in funding from both original and new investors, including Artis Capital Management and GGV Capital.

Varun Mehta served as the chief executive until March 2011, when he became the vice president of engineering. Suresh Vasudevan assumed the role of CEO, and Umesh Maheshwari became the chief technology officer.

In October 2013, the company filed for its initial public offering on the New York Stock Exchange and subsequently went public on December 13, 2013, under the ticker symbol NMBL.

Throughout its history, Nimble Storage introduced various product updates and expansions. In June 2014, the company announced the CS700 Series Arrays and an All-Flash Shelf, along with its Adaptive Flash technology. In November 2014, Nimble Storage released arrays supporting the Fibre Channel protocol.

In July 2015, the company announced updates to the Adaptive Flash platform, including Nimble SmartSecure (software-based encryption), all-flash service levels, REST APIs, InfoSight-VMVision per-VM monitoring and integrated data protection. Nimble Storage also achieved Federal Information Processing Standard 140-2 Certification for the Adaptive Flash platform in August 2015.

The company experienced significant growth and recognition, ranking sixth on Deloitte's list of the 500 fastest-growing technology, media, telecommunications, life sciences, and energy tech companies in North America in November 2015.

On February 23, 2016, Nimble Storage unveiled the Predictive All Flash Array series, combining fast flash performance with InfoSight Predictive Analytics. This was followed by the introduction of the AF-1000 Series All Flash array and updated CS-Series Adaptive Flash array portfolio on August 10, 2016.

On October 17, 2016, Nimble Storage formed a strategic partnership with Lenovo, resulting in the ThinkAgile CX Series solution.

Hewlett Packard Enterprise (HPE) announced the acquisition of Nimble Storage for approximately $1.09 billion in cash on March 7, 2017. The acquisition was finalized on April 5, 2017.

== Products ==
=== All Flash Arrays ===
Nimble Storage's AF-Series arrays utilize flash performance as well as InfoSight Predictive Analytics. The AF-Series has product lines for data centers with different configurations based on the desired workload. The product lines are AF1000, AF3000, AF5000, AF7000, and AF9000.

=== Adaptive Flash Arrays ===
The Nimble CS-Series iSCSI and Fibre Channel storage array has 4 product lines for data centers available in each CS-Series. The product lines are CS200, CS300, CS500, and CS700 and combine both HDDs with SSDs in a hybrid fashion. In August 2016, Nimble Storage updated their CS-Series arrays to the following: CS1000/H, CS3000, CS5000, and CS7000. Nimble Storage also provides an All-Flash Shelf to add to CS-Series arrays.

=== Secondary Flash Arrays ===
The Secondary Flash Array was the first new Nimble product to be launched post merger with Hewlett Packard Enterprise. It is a hybrid system based around the standard Nimble architecture but with enhanced de-duplication. The product is intended as a target for backups.

=== SmartStack reference architectures ===
Nimble Storage provides SmartStack integrated infrastructure technology for Cisco Systems. Jointly developed by Cisco and Nimble Storage, SmartStack integrates compute, network, and storage resources. SmartStack provides Cisco Validated Designs and reference architectures that address the following workloads: desktop virtualization (or VDI), server virtualization and cloud computing, business-critical applications, Oracle database and applications, and SAP HANA.

== Technology ==
=== NimbleOS ===
NimbleOS is Nimble's operating system. It utilizes a patented file-system architecture and cache accelerated sequential layout (CASL). NimbleOS includes flexible flash scaling, adaptive flash service levels, dynamic flash-based read caching, write-optimized data layout, inline compression, scale-to-fit flexibility, scale out, snapshots and integrated data protection, efficient replication, deduplication, and zero-copy clones.

=== InfoSight Predictive Analytics ===
InfoSight is Nimble Storage's storage management and predictive analytics portal. It is designed to help with storage resource management as well as customer support.

=== Unified Flash Fabric ===
Nimble Storage's Unified Flash Fabric unifies Nimble's All Flash and Adaptive Flash arrays into a consolidated architecture with common data services. This architecture is built upon existing CASL architecture and InfoSight.
