= Configuration item =

Configuration management system unit

The term configuration item (CI) refers to the fundamental structural unit of a configuration management system. Examples of CIs include individual hardware or software components. The configuration-management system oversees the life of the CIs through a combination of processes and tools by implementing and enabling the fundamental elements of identification, change management, status accounting, and audits. This system aims to avoid the introduction of errors related to lack of testing as well as of incompatibilities with other CIs.

== Description ==
The term "configuration item" can be applied to a product, allocated component of a product, or both that satisfies an end use function, has distinct requirements, functionality and/or product relationships, and is designated for distinct control in the configuration-management system. Configuration items and their associated product configuration information versions, and approved changes, form the basis of any current approved configuration audit.

Each configuration item must be uniquely identified so that it can be distinguished from all other configuration items and their associated product configuration information.

From the perspective of the implementer of a change, the CI represents the items within the product structure affected by the change. Altering a specific baseline version of a configuration item creates a new version of the baseline containing the revised changes to the information impacted by the change. The CI part number may change if the new or updated part will no longer be interchangeable, functionally or physically, with the existing part, while the software CI version changes any time a change is implemented. In examining the effect of a change, two of the questions that must be asked are what configuration items are affected, and how the configuration items and their associated configuration information and interfaces are affected.

The use of the CI within a product can be traced through a robust status-accounting system, and the CI is subject to acceptance verification based on established criteria.

=== Configuration item types ===
Configuration items can take many forms, including hardware and devices, software applications, communications and networks, systems, locations, facilities, databases, and services. Entities of change management, incidents, problem management, and other processes are sometimes also considered configuration items.

=== CI attributes and data ===
Configuration items are represented by their properties. These properties can be common to all configuration items (e.g. a unique item code, description of function, end of the lifecycle, the business owner approving configuration item changes, and the technical owner, i.e. the administrator, supporting and implementing the changes). Further properties can be specific for the given item type. Hardware devices will have some properties, database servers another and application and certificates again other properties.

Examples of common properties:

- CI unique identifier or identification code
- CI name or label (often, both long names and short names)
- CI abbreviations or acronyms
- CI description
- CI ownership (organizations and people)
- CI importance

Identifying properties

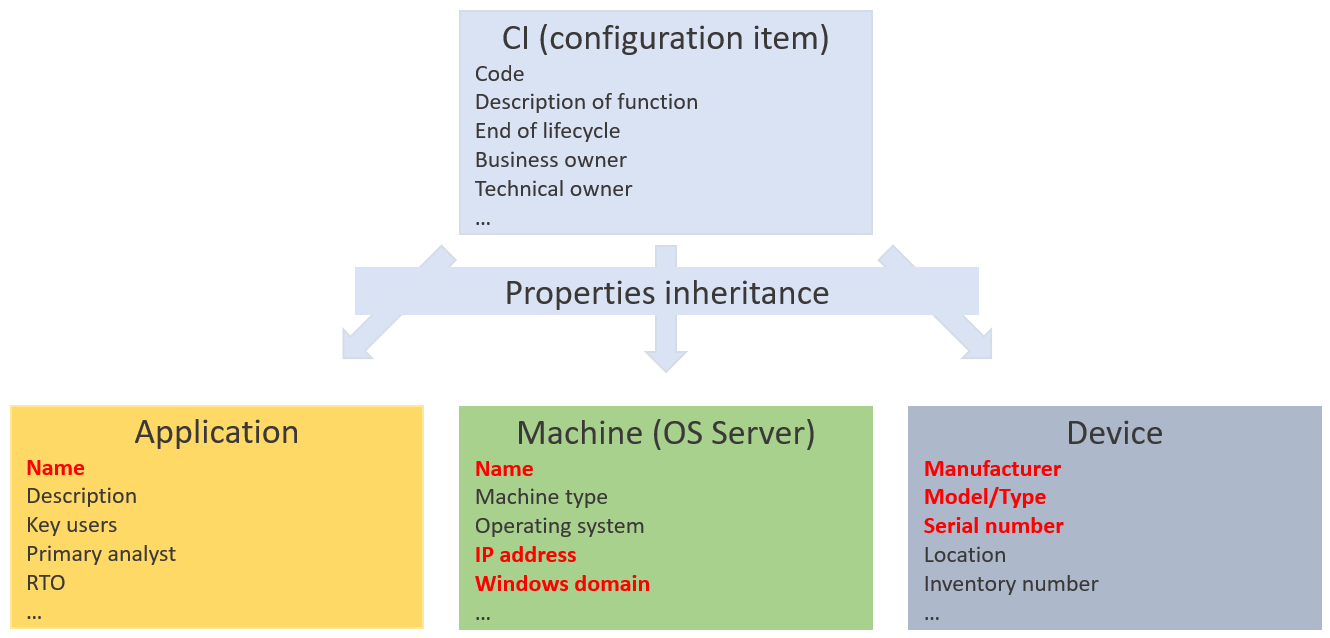

Each type of configuration item should have certain properties whose combination is unique, allowing the item to be recognized and distinguished from others. In the case of devices, such a unique combination might be the device's manufacturer, model/type, and serial number.

Identifying properties (highlighted in red) allow particular instances of these items to be distinguished from one another.

=== Releases ===
A release (itself, a versioned entity) may consist of several configuration items. The set of changes to each configuration item will appear in the release notes, and the notes may contain specific headings for each configuration item. A complex hardware configuration item may have many levels of configuration items beneath its top level; each configuration item level must meet the same fundamental elements of the configuration management system.

A modern approach to managing configuration items relating to releases is to make use of code repositories and artifact repositories to supplement the configuration management database. This can be seen in the use of a definitive media library.

== Vocabulary ==
In addition to its purpose in the implementation and management of a change, each configuration item's listing and definition should act as a common vocabulary across all groups connected to the product. One should define the CI at a level such that an individual involved with product marketing and an individual responsible for implementation can agree to a common definition when they use the name of the configuration item. Selection and identification of configuration items for a particular project can be seen as the first step in developing an overall architecture of the product from the top down.
