= Micro Focus =

British based multinational software and information technology business

Micro Focus International plc
- Type: Subsidiary
- Traded as: LSE: MCRO (2005–2023); NYSE: MFGP (2017–2023)
- Industry: Information technology
- Founded: 1976; 50 years ago
- Founder: Brian Reynolds
- Successor: OpenText
- Headquarters: Newbury, England
- Key people: Greg Lock (chairman); Stephen Murdoch (CEO)
- Products: Enterprise application integration and management software
- Services: IT consulting
- Revenue: ▼US$2,899.9 million (2021)
- Operating income: ▲US$(265.6) million (2021)
- Net income: ▲US$(424.4) million (2021)
- Number of employees: 11,000 (2022)
- Parent: Hewlett Packard Enterprise (2017–2023); OpenText (2023– )
- Subsidiaries: NetIQ; Serena Software
- Website: microfocus.com

Micro Focus International plc was a British multinational software and information technology business based in Newbury, Berkshire, England. The firm provided software and consultancy. The company was listed on the London Stock Exchange and the New York Stock Exchange until it was acquired by the Canadian software firm OpenText in January 2023.

== History ==
The Micro Focus logo circa 1985

Micro Focus was founded by Brian Reynolds in Notting Hill in 1976. In 1981, it became the first company to win the Queen's Award for Industry purely for developing a software product. The product was CIS COBOL, a standard-compliant COBOL implementation for microcomputers.

In 1998, the company acquired Intersolv, Inc., an applications enablement business, for US$534 million and the combined business was renamed Merant. The same year the company acquired XDB Systems with their XDB Enterprise Server relational database management system. In 2001 the business was demerged from Merant with help from Golden Gate Capital Partners and once again became Micro Focus. It was listed on the London Stock Exchange in 2005.

In May 2007, San Diego–based Acucorp, Inc., a developer of COBOL development tools and provider of technologies for COBOL applications, was acquired by Micro Focus for its ACUCOBOL-GT product lines.

In June 2008, the company acquired the Israeli NASDAQ listed software company NetManage for US$73.3 million.

In July 2008, the company acquired the privately held Austin, Texas–based Liant Software Corporation for its RM/COBOL and PL/I product lines. Liant Software owned the assets of Ryan-McFarland Corporation, a Micro Focus competitor in the 1980s.

In July 2009, the company acquired Borland, a developer of application lifecycle management tools, as well as the Quality Solutions part of Compuware, including the automation tool TestPartner.

In 2011, the company alleged that the New South Wales Police Force and other agencies were using 16,500 copies of its ViewNow software on various computers when police and other agencies were only ever entitled to 6,500 licences. The group initially alleged A$10 million in damages but later increased this to A$12 million after reviewing the results of a court-ordered audit of the police force's computer systems. The police force maintained during the court proceedings that it had paid for a site licence that entitled it to unlimited installations of the software for all of its officers. Despite this, it settled the matter out of court in 2012, for an undisclosed sum. The other agencies previously settled the matter out of court, also for undisclosed sums.

In December 2013, Micro Focus acquired the Orbix, Orbacus and Artix software product lines from Progress Software. These market-leading implementations of the CORBA standard were originally developed by IONA Technologies.

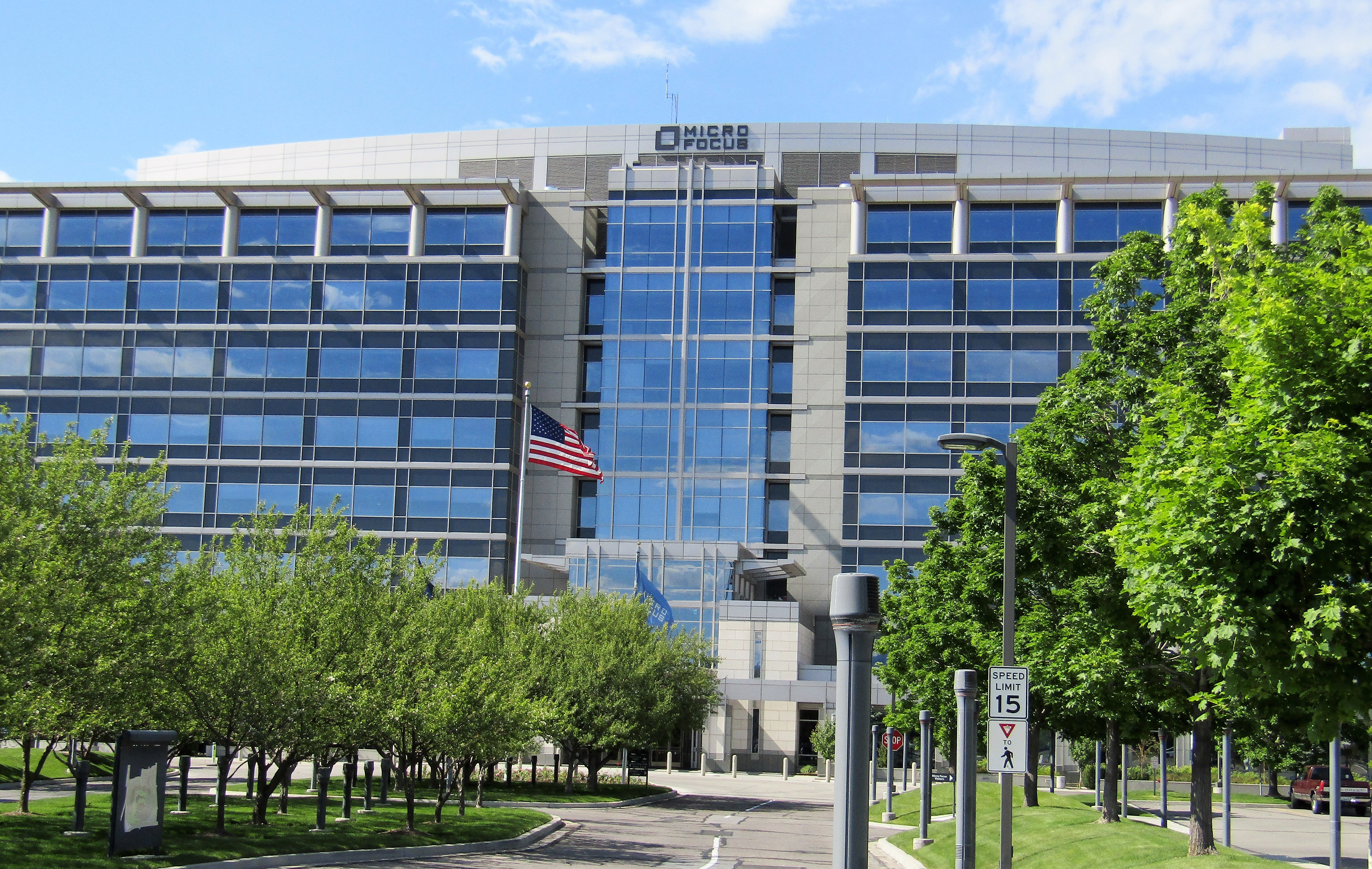
A Micro Focus office in the United States, formerly headquarters for Novell

On 15 September 2014, Micro Focus announced that it would acquire The Attachmate Group for US$1.2 billion in shares, which would give it ownership of the Attachmate, NetIQ, Novell, and SUSE product lines. Attachmate's parent company Wizard Parent LLC—consisting of the investment groups Elliott Management Corporation, Francisco Partners, Golden Gate Capital, and Thoma Bravo, would hold a 40% stake in Micro Focus post-acquisition. With the purchase of Attachmate, Micro Focus became the owner of the Unix operating system.

In 2015, Micro Focus acquired Authasas, which produces authentication middleware.

On 22 March 2016, Micro Focus announced its intent to acquire Serena Software, then valued at US$540 million. The acquisition was completed on 2 May 2016.

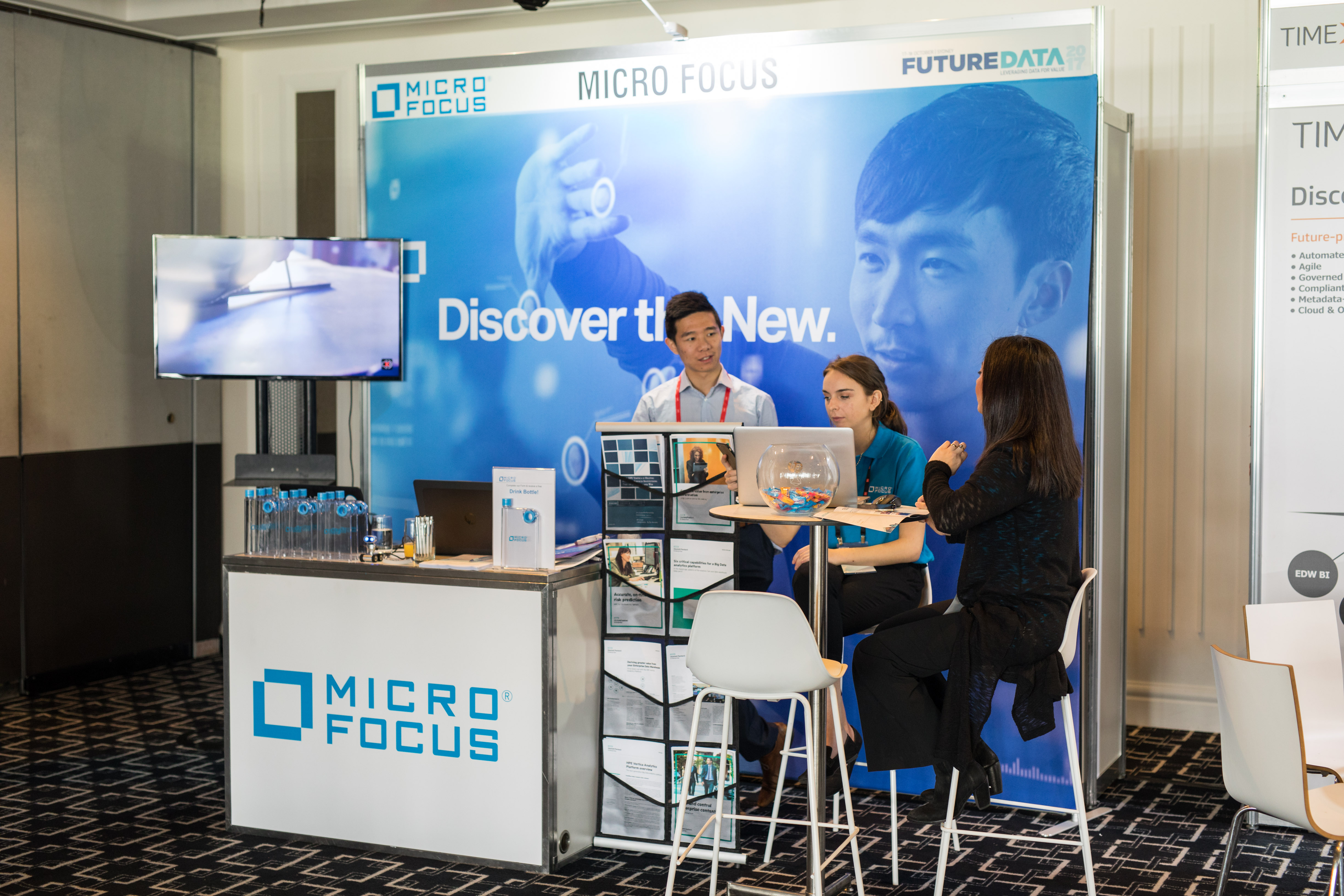
A Micro Focus exhibitor booth at a 2017 conference in Australia

On 7 September 2016, Micro Focus announced its intent to merge with Hewlett Packard Enterprise’s software business segment. The merger was completed on 1 September 2017.

On 4 October 2016, Micro Focus announced it had acquired Gwava Inc., an enterprise information archiving business.

On 19 March 2018, Micro Focus shares fell 55% to 849p after the company warned of a sharp fall in revenue; its chief executive, Chris Hsu, resigned.

On 2 July 2018, it was announced that Micro Focus would sell its SUSE business segment to EQT AB for $2.535 billion.

In July 2020, Micro Focus acquired Turkish cybersecurity company ATAR Labs for $8 million.

In August 2022, Canadian software firm OpenText announced that it would acquire Micro Focus in a deal valued at US$6 billion. The acquisition was approved by the court on 27 January 2023, so allowing the transaction to be completed on 31 January 2023.

In November 2023 OpenText announced that it would divest its Application Modernization and Connectivity (AMC) division to Rocket Software. The deal completed on 1 May 2024. AMC includes the COBOL business that formed the original Micro Focus.

== Acucorp, Inc. ==
Acucorp was founded in 1988 by sister and brother, Pamela Coker, CEO, and Drake Coker, Chief Scientist. Drake wrote a file system, Vision, and a COBOL compiler, ACUCOBOL-85, now called ACUCOBOL-GT. ACUCOBOL-GT offers a comprehensive set of extensions for programming and managing graphical user interfaces (GUIs). With these extensions, an ACUCOBOL-GT developer can add a full-featured GUI entirely in COBOL to an existing program.

== Liant Software Corporation ==
Liant Software Corporation was founded in 1983. This company was an outgrowth of the 3-way partnership named Digitek and a successor named Ryan-McFarland Corporation, which was sold to an Australian company named Austec. They sold it to a company named Language Processors, Inc.—later renamed Liant Software Corporation. The latter was acquired by Micro Focus International. Liant was still advertising its Open PL/I product in 1995.

== Ryan-McFarland Corporation ==
Dave McFarland and Don Ryan, both with a Digitek background, co-founded Ryan-McFarland Corporation. Ryan-McFarland was a major source for FORTRAN, COBOL and BASIC in the PC arena.

== See also ==
- iManager
