= IBM Cloud and Smarter Infrastructure =

The IBM Cloud and Smarter Infrastructure group, formed after rebranding IBM's Tivoli Software division in 2013, provides a range of computer system solutions. This group's areas of operation include data storage management, enterprise asset management, and IT service management. It incorporates IT operations and systems management technologies, addressing various aspects such as asset and service management, performance management, and integration of service with infrastructure management.

Company	Business Focus	Year
Tivoli	Systems Management	1996
DBMX	Data base performance management	1997
Unison	Job scheduling	1997
Software Artistry	Service Desk	1998
Dascom	Access management	1999
SANergy	Storage area network file sharing	2000
Accessible	Business systems management	2000
Access 360	Identity management	2002
Trellisoft	Storage resource management	2002
Metamerge	Meta directory	2002
Think Dynamics	Provisioning and resource allocation	2003
Candle	System z and distributed systems monitoring	2004
Cyanea	Composite application monitoring	2004
Isogon	Software license management	2005
Collation	Auto discovery and application mapping	2005
CIMS Lab	Software usage metering and reporting	2006
Micromuse	Network management	2006
Rembo	Operating system provisioning	2006
Dorana	Software asset management (Asset purchase - Ubiquity)	2006
ISS	Security monitoring and intrusion detection	2006
MRO	Asset management, service desk and service catalog	2006
Consul Risk Mgmt	System z RACF and distributed security mgmt	2007
Vallent	Wireless network management	2007
Encentuate	Enterprise Single sign on	2008
FilesX	Continuous data protection, Instant restore	2008
BigFix	Desktop/laptop lifecycle and security management	2010
Intelliden	Network configuration and change management	2010
TRIRIGA	Facilities management	2011
Butterfly	Storage planning SW and storage migration tools	2012
MaaS360	Mobile Device Management	2013

== List of IBM Tivoli products ==
- IBM Tivoli Storage Manager
- IBM Tivoli Storage Manager FastBack
- IBM Tivoli Workload Scheduler LoadLeveler
- Tivoli Endpoint Manager
- IBM OMEGAMON
- IBM Tivoli Workload Scheduler
- Tivoli Service Automation Manager
- IBM Tivoli Management Framework
- IBM Tivoli Configuration and Change Management Database
