= Bellamy's Organic =

Australian baby food and formula producer

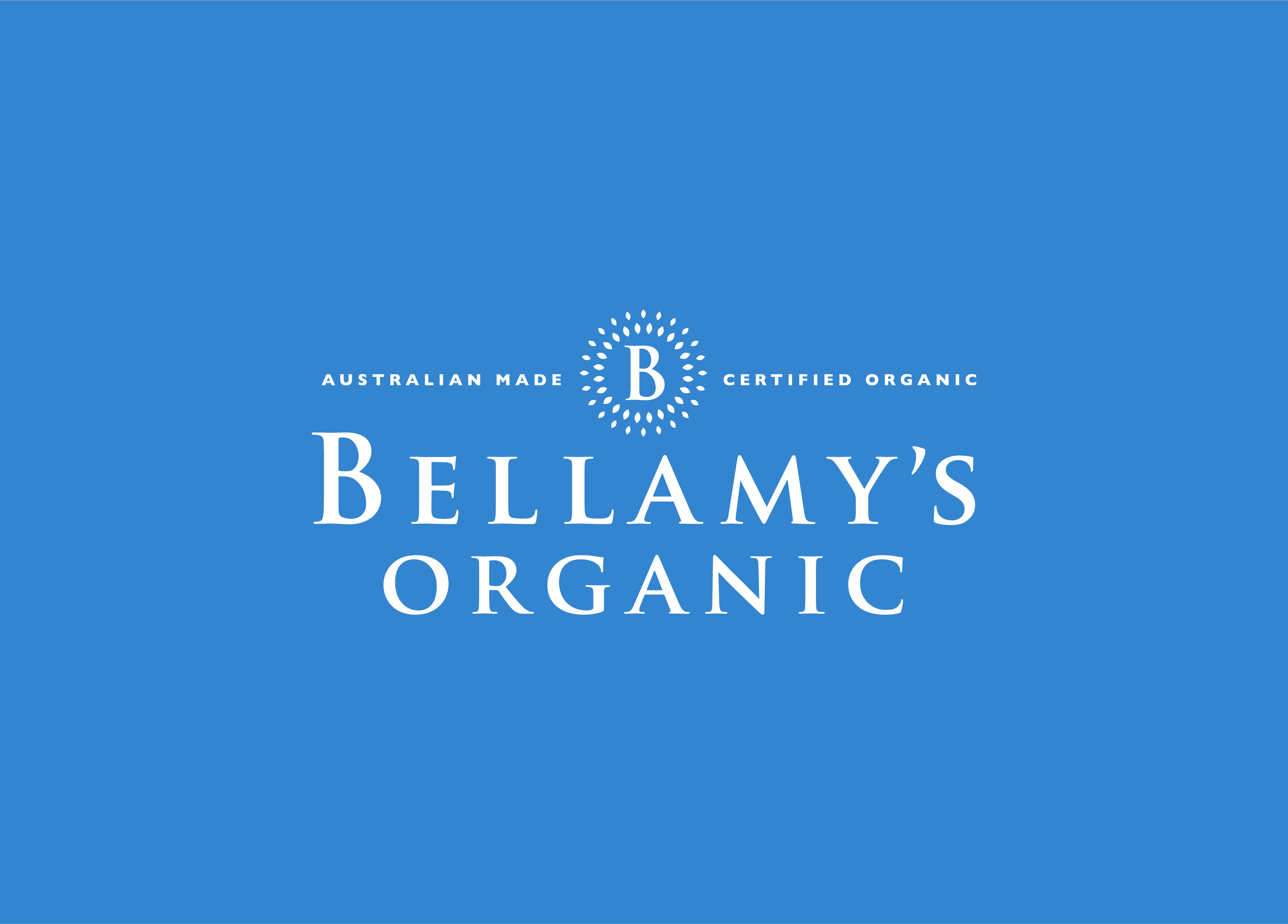
- logo_alt=Bellamy's Organic logo Bellamy's Organic
- Type: Subsidiary
- Industry: Food and beverage
- Founded: Launceston, Tasmania 2003
- Headquarters: Launceston, Tasmania, Australia
- Number of locations: 4
- Area served: Australia, China, Hong Kong, Malaysia, New Zealand, Singapore and Vietnam
- Key people: Richard Gu, CEO
- Products: Organic infant formula & organic food
- Revenue: A$240.2 million (2017)
- Net income: ▲ A$41.20 million (2015)
- Total assets: ▲ A$72.41 million (2015)
- Total equity: ▲ A$48.91 million (2015)
- Number of employees: ~37 (2017)
- Parent: Mengniu Dairy
- Website: bellamysorganic.com.au

Bellamy's Organic is an Australian organic infant formula and baby food producer, and was a wholly owned subsidiary of Bellamy's Australia (formerly Tasmanian Pure Foods Ltd) before being acquired by China Mengniu Dairy.

== History ==
Established by David Bellamy and Dooley Crighton-Bellamy in northern Tasmania in 2000, Bellamy's initially processed and marketed organically certified Tasmanian beef, lamb and pork. In 2004, the company became the first company to produce organically certified baby food, and in 2005 launched an organic infant formula in the Australian market.

The company was founded by David and Dooley, who were supported by a small group of "friends and family" investors, and was acquired by a larger consortium of investors using the company, Tasmanian Pure Foods Ltd in 2007. In June 2014, Tasmanian Pure Foods was renamed Bellamy's Australia. Following a highly successful July 2014 IPO, Bellamy's Australia Limited (BAL) listed on the Australian Stock Exchange (ASX) (Newcastle) on 5 August 2014. Heavy trading and a more than 30% rise in initial share price saw the launch of the company deemed an "outstanding success" by financial industry commentators.

In December 2016 Bellamy's Australia suspended trading of shares following a tumultuous fortnight for the organic group, which had half a billion dollars wiped off its value on Friday, 2 December.

In April 2017, Bellamy's confirmed acting CEO Andrew Cohen as its permanent chief executive. In June 2016, Cohen, formerly of Bain & Company, was appointed to the role of Chief Operations & Strategic Officer, before being appointed acting CEO in January 2017. The appointment of financial advisor and Acting CFO Nigel Underwood was also finalised in April 2017. Underwood, formerly CFO of transport operator Keolis Downer, was appointed to the role of Acting CFO on in January 2017 and subsequently made permanent in that role in April 2017.

In May 2017, Bellamy's Australia appointed John Ho of Hong Kong-based investment firm Janchor Partners as chairman.

On 16 September 2019 Bellamy's announced that it had entered into a $1.5 billion takeover scheme with China Mengniu Dairy Company and that its board is urging shareholders to approve the deal.

On 15 November, the $1.5 billion takeover was approved by Treasurer Josh Frydenberg, who explained the Foreign Investment Review Board (FIRB) had undertaken extensive consultation about the takeover, and unanimously recommended the deal was "not contrary to the national interest". But the sale was approved with conditions, including that the majority of Bellamy's directors are Australian citizens, the company must keep its headquarters in Australia for at least a decade, and it continues to invest $12 million in the local processing facilities in Victoria. Tarsi Luo was appointed Managing Director of Bellamy's Organic in May 2021.

== Products ==
The company's product range includes infant formula, follow-on formula, toddler milk, baby rice, baby porridge, apple and cinnamon breakfast, teething rusks, brown rice pasta, baby macaroni and spelt pasta, grain and fruit snacks, ready to serve baby meals, and vegetable macaroni. Products are developed for three specific age groups, targeting newborns (0–6 months), infants (6–12 months) and toddlers (1–3 years). In 2014 this range was expanded to include organic milk drinks for children in the 3+ years age group.

=== Certification ===
In Australia, the company's products are certified organic by the National Association for Sustainable Agriculture Australia (NASAA), which is an independent certifying body authorised by the United States Department of Agriculture (USDA), and which also holds accreditation under the US National Organic Program (USNOP) and the Japanese Agricultural Standard (JAS).

The principal competitive advantage and differentiator of the Bellamy's brand within its markets is their Australian-made and certified organic product guarantee. The company backs the authenticity of this statement by maintaining a rigorous focus on their supply chain and source of raw materials, as well as by maintaining independent Australian certification for each product. This guarantee is increasingly important with respect to the Chinese market, where the gradual erosion of the credibility of locally produced and certified "organic" products link has seen local buyers increasingly preferring "premium" and "super-premium" imported organic products.

Bellamy's has held individual organic certification for China since 2008, however in May 2014, Beijing required companies to go through a new registration process to import infant formula into China, temporarily halting imports. Bellamy's has since secured Chinese certification for its organic milk formula product, along with accreditation to register a company in China.

The company's formula and cereal products are certified Halal by the Islamic Coordinating Council of Victoria (ICCV). ICCV is the major Islamic organisation responsible for the certification, monitoring, and supervision of Halal food exports from Australia.

== Markets ==
=== Domestic ===
Bellamy's produces Australia's only certified organic infant formula product and is positioned as a "premium" brand within that domestic market. In 2013, the baby food and formula category in Australia experienced 9% current value growth largely due to baby formula which experienced a 12% value increase. Bellamy's had approximately 3% share of the overall baby category in 2014, with approximately 10% of the baby formula market share and 12% of the baby cereals and snacks market share. As at 2014, Bellamy's has an estimated 95 per cent share of the organic segment of that market.

Bellamy's has established a large distribution footprint in Australia, selling directly to major and independent supermarkets and pharmacy networks. In addition, Bellamy's has established a successful online sales capacity. Bellamy's product range is sold in more than 3,000 outlets in Australia, including Coles and Woolworths supermarkets, Chemist Warehouse, Toys "R" Us and Big W; as well as independent stores, and through an online retail portal.

=== Exports ===
It is estimated that 15% of the company's revenue for the 2014 financial year came from offshore. The company is a major exporter of organic infant formula to the (estimated 2014) $1 billion per annum Chinese organic infant formula market and is positioned as a "super premium" brand within that market. The company also exports certified organic food to Hong Kong, Taiwan, Singapore, Malaysia, Vietnam, and New Zealand; with plans to expand into the US and the UK in 2016.

The increasing demand for organic baby food and infant formula in the Chinese market has been "spurred by a series of food scares, the worst being the death of six children who had consumed baby formula laced with melamine". Bellamy's began exporting organic baby formula to China in 2008, prior to the 2008 Chinese milk scandal; with that market currently comprising 50 per cent of Bellamy's total business. The company has reported a growth rate of 70% per annum over the period 2008 to 2013, and revenue growth of 900% over those five years. Latest company reporting has the business forecasting increased sales to China of 264% in FY2015.

Increased focus on the development of the greater Asian market has seen the company establish subsidiary businesses in Shanghai and Singapore to handle marketing and distribution of Bellamy's products in China and South East Asia. Sales of organic infant formula are forecast to increase by 151% in the 2015 financial year, with organic food sales forecast to rise by 178% for the same period. Bellamy's has also flagged plans to expand into the currently $650 million US and $225 million UK organic baby food markets in 2016.

In June 2017, Bellamy's acquired the Camperdown Powder canning facility in Braeside, Victoria. The reinstatement of Camperdown Powder's CNCA licensing by the Certification and Accreditation Administration of the People's Republic of China, following a short-term suspension in July 2017, saw the company's shares price increase by 37 cents, or 4.7 per cent, to reach a 2017 high of $8.25 on 9 August 2017.

Bellamy's 2017 Annual Report upgraded its financial outlook for 2018 to forecast revenue growth of between 15% and 20%, with EBITDA margin growth of 17% to 20% (excluding its newly acquired Camperdown Powder plant). At Bellamy's annual general meeting on 26 October 2017, chief executive Andrew Cohen advised shareholders that the company's turnaround strategy was on track and that sales had stabilised and were gaining momentum.

== Awards ==
The company's expansion into the Chinese market and associated rapid growth have garnered significant attention within both media and academic circles, both in Australia and internationally.

Former high-profile CEO and Managing Director Laura McBain is widely credited as recognising the potential for Bellamy's in the Chinese organic import bonanza, making the decision that turned the company into a major Chinese food brand. McBain was named as the 2013 Telstra Tasmanian Business Woman of the Year, and went on to be named Telstra Business Woman of the Year for 2013 (Private and Corporate).

In August 2014, the company were announced as the 'Best Regional Mid-Market Business' in the 2014 BRW/GE Capital Mid-Market Awards.
