= Larry Garlick =

American businessman

Larry Garlick is an American businessman who was the founder and CEO of Remedy Corporation, a software company that produced the Action Request System.

== Education ==
Garlick earned a Bachelor of Science in Engineering and Master of Science in engineering, both from Stanford University with a specialization in Computer Engineering.

== Career ==
After graduating from Stanford, Garlick worked as an engineer and business executive at Xerox and Sun Microsystems. At Xerox, he worked on the development team of the Xerox Star.

Garlick established the Remedy Corporation in 1990 and was the company's CEO until its sale to competitor Peregrine Systems in 2001. After accounting irregularities were uncovered that would forced Peregrine Systems into bankruptcy, Garlick briefly returned in June 2002 to head the Remedy business unit through the crisis. He resigned from position before the Remedy business unit was sold to BMC Software.

== Personal life ==
After retiring in 2002, Garlick and his wife began splitting their time between Palo Alto, California and the Swan Valley in Western Montana.
