= Mercury Interactive =

Israeli-American company

Mercury Interactive Corporation
- Type: Part of HP Software Division, Hewlett-Packard
- Industry: Computer Systems; Software; Consulting; IT Services
- Founded: 1989; 37 years ago
- Fate: Acquired by HP, moved to Hewlett Packard Enterprise when HP split, and then spun out to Micro Focus.
- Headquarters: Cupertino, California, United States
- Products: IT Management Software
- Website: www.hp.com/software

Mercury Interactive Corporation was an Israeli-American company acquired by the HP Software Division. Mercury offered software for application management, application delivery, change and configuration management, service-oriented architecture, change request, quality assurance, and IT governance.

== History ==
In 1989, Zvi Schpizer, Ilan Kinriech and Arye Finegold founded Mercury Interactive Corporation. The company was based in California and had offices located around the world. It also had a large R&D facility in Yehud, Israel.

On 25 July 2006, Hewlett-Packard announced it would pay approximately $4.5 billion to acquire Mercury Interactive. In November, Mercury Interactive formally became part of HP. The Mercury Interactive products are now sold by HP Software Division.

Mercury Interactive legacy products were integrated and sold as part of the HP IT Management Software portfolio from the HP Software Division.

Most of the Mercury Interactive software assets were apportioned to Hewlett Packard Enterprise (HPE) when HP split into two companies. In September 2017, HPE completed the sale of most of its software assets, including the legacy Mercury Interactive products to UK-based Micro Focus.

In 2023, Canadian software company OpenText acquired Micro Focus, including Mercury Interactive products.

== Acquisitions ==
From 2000 until its HP acquisition in 2006, Mercury purchased several software companies:

- Conduct Software Technologies, Inc., acquired by Mercury Interactive in a share-swap deal worth about $50M, was a privately held software company founded in 1996 by Sharon Azulai, David Barzilai, and Ran Levy. The company provided network topology visualization products, to pinpoint bottlenecks and isolate the location of network problems both across the network and across the system infrastructure. Its main product was SiteRunner, which used multi-agent technology to pinpoint bottlenecks. As part of Mercury, Conduct alumni started a new project, nicknamed Falcon and later called Prism, that switched focus to monitoring web server traffic.
- Freshwater Software was a software vendor of a web server monitoring and administration tool called SiteScope. Mercury Interactive acquired Freshwater Software in 2001. The product is now called HP SiteScope software.
- Performant Inc. was a software vendor of J2EE diagnostic tools. Mercury Interactive acquired Performant in 2003 for $22.5M.
- Kintana Inc. was a software vendor of IT governance products. Mercury Interactive acquired Kintana in June 2003 for $225M. Kintana products are now called HP Project and Portfolio Management software.
- Appilog was a software vendor of auto-discovery and application mapping software. Appilog products mapped the relationships among applications and their underlying infrastructure. Mercury Interactive acquired Appilog for $49M in 2004. Appilog products are now part of HP Universal CMDB software, an HP Business Service Management offering.
- BeatBox Technologies (formerly named "ClickCadence LLC") was a software vendor of real user behavior tracking products. Mercury Interactive acquired BeatBox in 2005 for approximately $14 million in cash, "to extend the real user monitoring capabilities of its BTO software and to enhance its performance lifecycle offerings.". BeatBox was incorporated into Mercury's Real User Monitor (RUM) product, which is now part of HP Business Availability Center.
- Systinet (formerly named IdooX) was a software vendor of registry and enablement products for standard service-oriented architecture (SOA). Mercury Interactive acquired Systinet in 2006 for $105M. Systinet products are now called HP SOA Systinet software.

== Corporate malfeasance ==
From 4 January 2006 until its acquisition by Hewlett-Packard, Mercury Interactive was traded via the Pink Sheets as a result of being delisted from the NASDAQ due to noncompliance with filing requirements. On 3 January 2006, Mercury missed a second deadline for restating its financials, leading to the delisting.

Three top executives resigned in November 2005 after a special committee at the company found that they benefited from a program to favorably price option grants. The committee found that, beginning in 1995, there were 49 instances in which the stated date of a stock option grant was different from the date on which the option appeared to have been granted. In almost every case, the price on the actual date was higher than the price on the stated grant date. A former Chief Financial Officer, Sharlene Abrams, later associated with the financial misreporting, had resigned previously in November 2001.

The Chief Executive Officer, Amnon Landan, also was found to have misreported personal stock option exercise dates to increase his profit on transactions three times between 1998 and 2001. In addition, a $1 million loan to Landan in 1999—which was repaid—did not appear to have been approved in advance by the Board of Directors and was referred to in some of the company's public filings with the Securities and Exchange Commission, but was not clearly disclosed. In 2007, the SEC filed civil fraud charges against Landan, Smith, Skaer and Abrams. Without admitting or denying the SEC's allegations, Mercury Interactive agreed to pay a $28 million civil penalty to settle the Commission's charges in 2007.

The SEC settled charges against Sharlene Abrams in March 2009. Abrams agreed to pay $2,287,914 in disgorgement, of which $1,498,822 represented the "in-the-money" benefit from her exercise of backdated option grants, and a $425,000 civil penalty. In September 2009, a federal judge dismissed all charges brought by the SEC against Susan Skaer, who now goes by the name Susan Skaer Tanner.

== Products ==
- HP ALM software: Application lifecycle management and testing toolset
- HP LoadRunner software: Integrated software performance testing tools
- HP QuickTest Professional software: Automated software testing
- HP Quality Center software (formerly HP TestDirector for Quality Center software): Quality management software for applications
- HP SiteScope software: Agentless monitoring software
- HP Universal CMDB software: Configuration management database
- HP Project and Portfolio Management software Project Management module: zero-client software for scheduling and managing software
- HP Business Process Testing software: Automated and manual testing software for test design, test creation, test maintenance, test execution, and test data management
- HP Diagnostics software: Diagnostic software for applications
- HP Discovery and Dependency Mapping software: Automated application and IT infrastructure mapping software
- HP Functional Testing software: Automated functional and regression testing software
- HP Real User Monitor software: Software that provides real-time visibility into application performance and availability from the user perspective
- HP Performance Center: Application performance testing management solutions
- HP Business Availability Center: Business service management solutions
- HP Mobile Center: mobile application testing solution

== Competitors ==
Quality Assurance

- IBM (acquired Rational)
- Micro Focus (acquired Borland which acquired Segue - SilkTest, SilkPerformer)
- Parasoft
- Tricentis

IT Governance / ITIL / ITSM

- BMC
- CA (acquired Niku)
- Compuware (acquired ChangePoint)
- IBM (Tivoli)
- Microsoft (System Center)
- Primavera Systems
- Quest Software

Monitoring and Diagnostics

- BMC (acquired Coradiant)
- CA (acquired Wily Technology)
- Compuware
- IBM
- Microsoft (System Center)

== Bibliography ==
- "Mercury Interactive Shares to Be Delisted". TheStreet.Com. Archived from the original on January 5, 2006.
