= Laura McBain =

Australian business executive

- Born: Laura Nelson; Sydney, Australia
- Education: University of New South Wales and University of Tasmania
- Known for: Former CEO of Bellamy's Organic

Laura McBain is an Australian businesswoman and media commentator. She is the former CEO and managing director of Bellamy's Australia and is known for her leading role in transforming family-run Tasmanian business Bellamy's Organic into a major Australian and international organic food producer.

== Background and education ==
Born and raised in Sydney, McBain worked for a number of years as an accountant with Crowe Horwath (formerly WHK) and regional accounting firms in Launceston, while completing bachelor's degrees in Commerce and Business at the University of New South Wales and the University of Tasmania; and in 2013 completed the IMD Leadership Challenge.

== Bellamy's Organic ==
Prior to joining Bellamy's Organic Laura McBain practised as an accountant, specialising in the provision of business advisory and taxation services. She joined the then-struggling Launceston-based food and baby formula company in 2007 as general manager just prior to the buyout of the family owned business by Tasmanian Pure Foods.

McBain is widely credited as recognising the potential for Bellamy's in the nascent Chinese organic infant food and formula market, making the decision that turned the company into a major Chinese food brand. With McBain as general manager, the company reported a growth rate of 70% per annum over the period 2008 to 2013, with revenue growing by 900% over those five years to reach an estimated $50 million in the 2014 financial year. Latest company reporting has the business forecasting increased sales to China of 264% in FY2015.

In June 2014, Tasmanian Pure Foods was renamed Bellamy's Australia with McBain subsequently appointed as managing director and chief executive officer. Following a highly successful July 2014 IPO, Bellamy's Australia Limited (BAL) listed on the Australian Stock Exchange (ASX) in August 2014.

On 26 August 2016, McBain sold 165,000 shares in Bellamy valued at $14.54 (total value $2.4 million) on top of the 400,000 shares sold at $10.49 (total value $4.19 million) on 17 March 2016.

In December 2016, Bellamy's Australia suspended trading of shares following a tumultuous fortnight for the organic group, which had half a billion dollars wiped off its value on 2 December. The share price dropped from a height of $13.58 to $5.98 after the company have revealed its report outlining that the company have had shrinking market share in China for the past few months.

In January 2017, she was replaced by Andrew Cohen as the CEO of Bellamy's Organic.

== After Bellamy's ==
In August 2017, McBain became managing director of Primary Opinion (later renamed Longtable Group), then part owner of the Maggie Beer brand. She left Maggie Beer in October 2019.

McBain joined the board of Tasmanian whisky company Lark Distilling in May 2020. She was interim CEO from February 2022 to May 2023.

In September 2023, she was announced as a member of the inaugural board of the Tasmania Football Club.

== Awards and recognition ==
The company's expansion into the Chinese market and associated rapid growth have garnered significant attention within both media and academic circles, both in Australia and internationally.

In 2013 McBain was named as the 2013 Telstra Tasmanian Business Woman of the Year, and went on to be named Telstra Business Woman of the Year for 2013 (Private and Corporate).

=== Awards ===
- Telstra Tasmanian Business Woman of the Year (2013)
- Telstra Australian Private and Corporate Business Woman of the Year (2013)
- Telstra Tasmanian Private and Corporate Business Woman of the Year (2013)
- Telstra Tasmanian Business Innovation Woman of the Year (2013)

McBain appears regularly in local and national Australian media, providing commentary on the Australian organic industry, local and international markets and state politics.

McBain's role in the noteworthy transformation of the Bellamy's Organic business and the company's rapid and continued growth has been the subject of a chapter in influential marketing textbook Principles of Marketing.
