= NASAA =

NASAA can mean:

- National Association for Sustainable Agriculture Australia
- National Assembly of State Arts Agencies
- National Association of State Approving Agencies
- North American Securities Administrators Association
