= Bellamy's Australia =

Food and beverage company

- Formerly: Tasmanian Pure Foods
- Industry: Food & Beverage
- Founded: 2014 in Launceston, Tasmania
- Fate: Acquired by Mengniu Dairy
- Headquarters: Launceston, Australia
- Number of locations: 8
- Area served: Australia, China, Hong Kong, Malaysia, New Zealand, Singapore, Vietnam
- Key people: Tarsi Luo CEO
- Products: Organic infant formula & Organic food
- Revenue: A$240.2 million (2017)
- Net income: ▲ A$41.20 million
- Number of employees: 46 (2017)
- Subsidiaries: Bellamy's Organic
- Website: bellamysaustralia.com.au

Bellamy's Australia (formerly Tasmanian Pure Foods Ltd) is a major Australian food and beverage company, and is the parent company of Bellamy's Organic, Australia's largest organic infant formula producer.

== History ==
Bellamy's started as Bellamy's Organic in Launceston, Tasmania in 2003 as a family-operated company. In 2007 Bellamy's Organic was purchased by Tasmanian Pure Foods, a privately owned business set up to invest in and build Tasmanian food and agribusinesses. In June 2014 Tasmanian Pure Foods was renamed Bellamy's Australia.

Following a highly successful July 2014 IPO, Bellamy's Australia Limited (BAL) listed on the Australian Stock Exchange (ASX) on 5 August 2014. Heavy trading and a more than 30% rise in initial share price saw the launch of the company deemed an 'outstanding success' by financial industry commentators.

Rodd Peters, founding partner of Peters Linnette Lawyers and consultant with Australian law firm Kemp Strang, was elected to the board of Bellamy's on 28 February 2017 and was appointed as interim Chairman of the Board on 1 March 2017. In April 2017, John Ho, founder and chief investment officer of Hong Kong-based investor Janchor Partners, joined Bellamy's board as a non-executive Director, before being appointed as Chairman in May 2017.

In April 2017, Bellamy's confirmed acting CEO Andrew Cohen as its permanent chief executive. In June 2016, Cohen, formerly of Bain & Company, was appointed to the role of Chief Operations & Strategic Officer, before being appointed acting CEO in January 2017. The appointment of financial advisor and Acting CFO Nigel Underwood was also finalised in April 2017. Underwood, formerly CFO of transport operator Keolis Downer, was appointed to the role of Acting CFO on in January 2017 and subsequently made permanent in that role in April 2017.

In August 2017, the Group announced revenue for the year to June 2017 of $240.2 million (2016: $234.1 million) and normalised profit after tax of $28.2 million. On 9 August, Bellamy's shares gained 32 cents, or 4.1%, to reach $8.20, reaching their highest level since early December 2016.

In December 2019, China Mengniu Dairy acquired Bellamy's Australia for $1.5 billion. Tarsi Luo was appointed Managing Director of Bellamy's Organic in May 2021.

== Company overview ==
Bellamy's is a Tasmanian-based company that produce certified organic foods. Bellamy's supplies its product range to supermarket chains, pharmacy chains and independent stores across Australia, and sells direct to consumers via an online sales portal. Bellamy's also exports its products to customers in China, Hong Kong, Singapore, Malaysia, Vietnam and New Zealand. As a result of the high demand for Bellamy's products in Asia, the company opened an office in Shanghai in 2012 and in Singapore in 2014.

=== Corporate structure ===
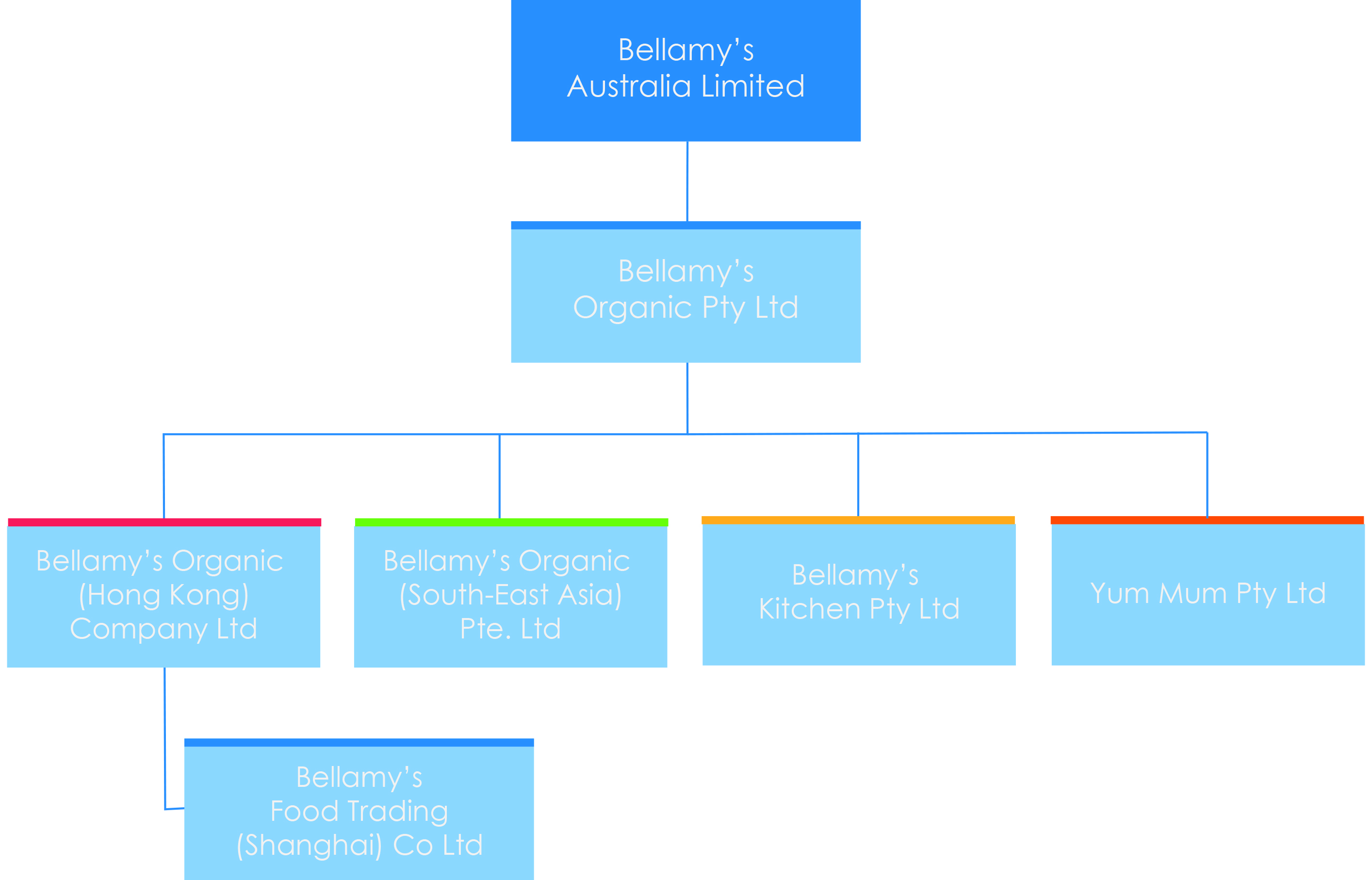

=== Board of directors ===
- John Ho - Non-executive Director and Chairman
- John Murphy - Independent Non-executive Director and Deputy Chairman; Deputy Chairman Chair of Audit and Risk
- Rodd Peters - Independent Non-executive Director
- Wai-Chan Chan - Independent Non-Executive Director

=== Public listing ===
In July 2014, Bellamy's Australia sold 25 million new shares and 10.9 million existing shares to raise nearly $36 million, in what was described by the Australian Financial Review as "one of the best-performing initial public offers of the year". Listing on the Australian Stock Exchange (ASX) on 5 August 2014, Bellamy's Australia Limited (BAL) shares were "quickly embraced by investors", surging in value as much as 34% in the first day of trading. Described by stock analysts as an "outstanding success", prices rose to a high of $1.34, before closing 30.1% above the $1 offer price at $1.31, giving the company a market capitalisation of $124 million. The issue price has valued the company at 19-times forward earnings for Financial Year 2015, with an indicative dividend of 1.6%. Share prices remained strong in the following week's trading with a mid-week high of $1.47 settling to $1.39 at closing on Friday 15 August.

== Range of products ==
The company's product range includes infant formula, follow-on formula, toddler milk, baby rice, baby porridge, apple and cinnamon breakfast, teething rusks, brown rice pasta, baby macaroni and spelt pasta, grain and fruit snacks, ready to serve baby meals, and vegetable macaroni. Products are developed for three specific age groups, targeting newborns (0–6 months), infants (6–12 months) and toddlers (1–3 years). In 2014 this range was expanded to include organic milk drinks for children in the 3+ years age group; positioned as a supplementary food for children, created to complement the dietary needs of toddlers and children who may require additional energy and nutrients.

== Domestic and international markets ==
Bellamy's produces Australia's only certified organic infant formula product and is positioned as a "premium" brand within that domestic market. In 2013, the baby food and formula category in Australia experienced 9% current value growth largely due to baby formula, which experienced a 12% value increase. Bellamy's had approximately 3% share of the overall baby category in 2014, with approximately 10% of the baby formula market share and 12% of the baby cereals and snacks market share. As at 2014, Bellamy's had an estimated 95 per cent share of the organic segment of that market.

It is estimated that 15% of the company's revenue for the 2014 financial year came from offshore. The company is a major exporter of organic infant formula to the (estimated 2014) $1 billion per annum Chinese organic infant formula market and is positioned as a "super premium" brand within that market. Increased focus on the development of the greater Asian market has seen the company establish subsidiary businesses in Shanghai and Singapore to handle marketing and distribution of Bellamy's products in China and South East Asia. The company's sales of organic infant formula are forecast to increase by 151% in the 2015 financial year, with organic food sales forecast to rise by 178% for the same period. Bellamy's has also flagged plans to expand into the currently $650 million US and $225 million UK organic baby food markets in 2016.

New e-commerce regulations in China in 2016 led to an oversupply of Australian-labelled baby formula, causing widespread retail price discounting and heavily impacting company earnings in the second half of 2015–16 and first half of 2016–17. The appointment in June 2016 of retail pricing specialist and Bain & Company partner Andrew Cohen as Chief Operations & Strategic Officer, saw revenue for the six months to 31 December rise 12.5 per cent to $118.3 million compared to a year earlier.

== Awards and recognition ==
The company's expansion into the Chinese market and associated rapid growth have garnered significant attention within both media and academic circles, both in Australia and internationally.

The company's rapid and continued growth has been the subject of a section in influential marketing textbook 'Principles of Marketing' in which the success of the business has been attributed to Bellamy's "sophisticated market research and their ability to launch new products at the right time with a genuine offering" by contributing author Lewis.

In 2013, high-profile CEO and Managing Director Laura McBain was named as the Telstra Tasmanian Business Woman of the Year, and went on to be named Telstra Business Woman of the Year (Private and Corporate).

In August 2014, the company was announced as the 'Best Regional Mid-Market Business' in the 2014 BRW/GE Capital Mid-Market Awards.
