= TeamSite =

- Developer(s): Interwoven
- Type: Content management system
- License: Proprietary
- Website: www.opentext.com/products/content-management-system

OpenText TeamSite is an enterprise web content management system developed by Interwoven. At present, it is owned, maintained, marketed by OpenText, a company that acquired it from Hewlett-Packard on May 1, 2016. Interwoven was founded in 1995, and acquired by Autonomy Corporation on March 17, 2009. Autonomy was acquired by Hewlett-Packard in 2011.

== History ==
Interwoven was founded in 1995 in California by Singaporean Peng Tsin Ong, who was also Interwoven's first CEO and chairman. Peng was the co-founder of Match.com, and later went on to found Encentuate. In its private startup phase the company was backed by Foundation Capital, Draper Fisher Jurvetson, Accel Partners and other venture capital co-investors including Gary Kremen.

On October 8, 1999 Interwoven had their initial public offering (IPO) on NASDAQ with Credit Suisse First Boston as the lead underwriter.

=== Sale ===
On January 21, 2009, Interwoven announced it agreed to be acquired by Autonomy Corporation, based in England. Autonomy estimated the consideration at $775 million

The acquisition was finalized on March 17, 2009.

HP bought Autonomy on August 19, 2011.

OpenText acquired TeamSite, along with other HP Software products in May 2016.
