= Candle Corporation =

American software company

- Type: Private
- Industry: Software
- Founded: October 1976; 50 years ago in Toronto, Ontario (as Candle Services Corporation); 1977 in West Los Angeles, California (as Candle Corporation)
- Founder: Aubrey G. Chernick
- Defunct: April 2004; 22 years ago
- Fate: Acquired by IBM
- Products: System monitoring applications; Middleware
- Number of employees: 2,000 (2000, peak)
- Website: candle.com at the Wayback Machine (archived 1997-10-21)

Candle Corporation was an American software company founded by Aubrey Chernick and active from 1976 to 2004. The company spent the first two decades developing system monitoring applications for a variety of IBM mainframes and their corresponding software, their first being OMEGAMON which saw quick widespread adoption in commercial enterprises. In the mid-1990s, the company made pivots toward non-mainframe monitoring software and middleware. IBM acquired the company for $641 million in 2004.

== History ==
=== 1970s – 1980s ===
Aubrey G. Chernick (born 1948 in Los Angeles, California), the founder of Candle, grew up in Deloraine, Manitoba, after his family moved there from California. After graduating from the University of Manitoba with a Bachelor of Science in chemistry, he landed a job at the university's environmental protection laboratory, performing analyses of the Red River of the North. The minicomputers at the lab were Chernick's first hands-on experience with computers; with a fellow employee, he learned how to program in BASIC. Following this, Chernick deviated from his original career path of medicine to work as a software developer for Computer Science Corporation (CSC)'s Canadian subsidiary in Ontario. After getting laid off from CSC after three months, he worked as a programmer for Laurentian University, working on IBM's System/360 Model 40 mainframe, and for the Government of Manitoba, where he learned how to operate and code for IBM's MFT and MVS operating systems. These jobs provided Chernick his first experiences with mainframes.

Candle employed 52 people in 1980 and logged $4.5 million in revenue for that year; in December alone the company recorded sales of $1 million. In January 1981, the company released OMEGAMON/CICS, a performance monitor oriented toward the financial sector and their transaction processing systems. In September 1982, Candle released MVS, targeting system administrators. Candle's sales in 1981 totaled $10.4 million, while employment grew to 108. That same year, the company established a philanthropic medical and health foundation, the Candle Foundation.

The company reached revenues of $100 million in 1988, a year after acquiring Chicago-based Netserv, Inc. By the end of the next year, Candle employed roughly 700 people. Candle was second in market share in the field of performance measurement software, according to Software Magazine, cornering 32 percent of the market. They were narrowly defeated by IBM (33 percent); third place was Boole & Babbage (13 percent). In 1988, the company released AF/OPERATOR, one of the first console automation software packages, and AF/REMOTE an automation management utility. Shortly after the company released OMEGAMON for DB/2 relational databases, which saw quick widespread adoption. In June 1989, the company announced OMEGACENTER, an integrated performance management and automation software package for data centers and large companies running local IBM mainframes. OMEGACENTER was one of the first performance measuring applications with a graphical user interface, via the Status Monitor tool.

=== 1990s – 2000s ===
In summer 1990, Candle released OMEGAMON II, which integrated several of the company's existing applications and built on the graphical user interface of Status Monitor to these integrated functions. In 1991, the company unveiled three more software utilities, including a pair for DB/2 and the OMEGAVIEW status management utility. By the end of 1990, the company reached $151.4 million in sales. In 1991, they were named the 20th largest software company in Software Magazine. In late 1992, Candle moved its headquarters to a 150,000-square-foot building in the Water Garden area of Santa Monica, in the biggest office lease within Los Angeles County in 1992. It also opened a data center of its own, in the outskirts of Los Angeles. In 1993, Candle introduced OMEGACENTER for VMS and OMEGAMON II for SMS. Candle logged $210 million in sales that year; the following year, the company collected revenues of $213 million.

In 1995, the company released Candle Command Center (CCC), a suite of network and systems management software for servers running AIX and MVS and PC-compatible workstations running OS/2. With the release of CCC, Candle began pivoting away from mainframe software, the company simultaneously launching a $500 million research and development initiative to reinforce this pivot. The company also placed its first advertisement in a trade publication to communicate this move.

In 1996, Candle made yet another pivot toward developing middleware for networked computers. To this end, Candle acquired several companies: CleverSoft, Inc., a provider of management tools for servers running Lotus Notes based in Scarborough, Maine; AMSYS North America, a service provider for MQSeries based in Mendon, Massachusetts; PowerQ Software Corporation, a maker of MQSeries software development and testing environments; and Apertus Technologies' MQView for distributed MQSeries installations. Employment in Candle reached 1,200 in 1996, approximately 550 of which working in the company's 29 branch offices. During this time, the company's mainframe software and middleware were used in roughly 5,000 mainframes, and it counted 75 percent of the Fortune 500 among its clientele.

Candle relocated its headquarters again in 1999, moving about 700 employees from Santa Monica to a four-story 335,000-square-foot building in El Segundo—a building once occupied by Rockwell International for the Design and Engineering of B-1 Lancers. In the same year, the company shifted its focus to e-commerce and launched eBA*ServiceMonitor, a comprehensive monitoring application for online businesses. By the end of the millennium, Candle reached $382 million in revenue and employed 1,800 people total.

The company reached the 2,000 employee mark in 2000, the same year sales reached $400 million. In the next year, the company released OMEGAMON XE and DE, configurations of their flagship product centered on e-businesses, and a software-as-a-service platform, CandleNet eBusiness Platform, which facilitated the deployment of e-commerce services. The split between mainframe and non-mainframe pursuits within the company was 60-to-40 by this point. In 2002, the company released PathWAI, a line of software packages and consulting services for streamlining the process of designing and developing middleware and web server back-ends. Candle reached $207 million in revenue in 2002 and $328 million in sales in 2003.

In 2004, IBM acquired Candle Corporation and paid Chernick $641 million. After the acquisition, IBM absorbed Candle's assets into their Tivoli Software division.
