= Remedy Corporation =

American software company

- Type: Subsidiary of BMC Software
- Industry: Computer software
- Founded: 1990; 36 years ago
- Headquarters: Mountain View, California, U.S.
- Key people: Larry Garlick, Founder & CEO; Dave Mahler, VP Marketing; Doug Mueller, Chief Architect
- Products: Action Request System
- Website: www.remedy.com

Remedy Corporation was a software company that produced the Action Request System and various applications therein. It is one of the biggest and oldest names in ITSM software. Remedy is now the Service Management Business Unit of BMC Software.

== History ==
Remedy Corporation was founded in 1990 by Doug Mueller, Dave Mahler, and Larry Garlick, who was the CEO until 2001. The company went public in 1995 and in 1996 was named by Business Week as the "Number 1 Top Hot Growth Company in America."

In 2001, competitor Peregrine Systems, purchased the company for $1.2 billion in cash and stock. On September 22, 2002, Peregrine and its wholly owned subsidiary, Peregrine Remedy, Inc., filed for voluntary protection under Chapter 11 of the United States Bankruptcy Code. Two months after accounting irregularities forced Peregrine Systems into bankruptcy, it sold the Remedy business unit to BMC Software. Remedy was then known as Remedy, a BMC Software Company until 2004, when it became known as the Service Management Business Unit.
