= Tsam =

Tsam may refer to:

- Cham Albanians, a sub-group of Albanians in the northwestern Greece
- Cham dance, named tsam (Цам) in Mongolian
- Herzl Yankl Tsam (1835–1915), Jewish cantonist in the Russian Empire

== Organisations ==
- Eastern Macedonia Army Section (Tmima Stratias Anatolikis Makedonias), a field army of the Hellenic Army in World War II
- The Scout Association of Malta, the Maltese affiliate of the World Organization of the Scout Movement
- Tivoli Service Automation Manager, a cloud computing management package from IBM
- Toyota South Africa Motors, an automobile manufacturer in South Africa
