= Omegamon =

Omegamon may refer to:

- Omnimon, a Digimon
- IBM OMEGAMON, a software bundle
