= DB Networks =

- Industry: Technology, Information Security
- Founded: 2009
- Headquarters: San Diego, California
- Key people: Brett Helm; Chairman and CEO; Steve Hunt; President and COO
- Products: Database Security
- Website: http://www.dbnetworks.com

DB Networks is a privately held Information Security company founded in the United States The company is headquartered in San Diego, California, and its regional offices are located in Palo Alto, California and Seattle, Washington.

In May 2018, DB Networks announced that it will change its company name to DB CyberTech.

== History ==
DB Networks was founded in United States in 2009 to provide database security including database infrastructure assessment, compromised credential identification, and SQL injection defense, predominantly to the financial services industry and federal government. The company was initially financed by Angel investors. In 2012 the company raised $4.5M in venture capital from Khosla Ventures. In 2014 the company closed a $17 Million round of funding led by Khosla Ventures and Grotech Ventures.

The company's first product, the ADF-4200, was launched in February 2013. Also in February 2013 the company announced a partnership with Alamo City Engineering Services (ACES) to offer its products to the US Military and civilian federal agencies. In October 2013 the company announced the IDS-6300, later renamed DBN-6300, originally as a SQL injection defense and database infrastructure security product.

In 2013 DB Networks was invited to join the Cync cybersecurity technology program under the direction of Northrop Grumman and the University of Maryland, Baltimore County Research Park Corporation. The Cync program identifies innovative technologies to combat cybersecurity threats.

In 2014 AMP Tech Solutions was announced as a channel partner to offer DB Network products through the NASA Solutions for Enterprise-Wide Procurement (SEWP) IV contract to the United States federal agencies.

In 2015 DB Networks was awarded two United States patents for their database security technologies.

DB Networks began licensing their database security software and technologies to original equipment manufacturers (OEMs) in February 2016 coinciding with the launch of their Layer 7 Database Sensor. Partnerships have been announced with FireEye, Cyphort, and Security On-Demand.

== Technology ==
DB Networks database security technology is based on machine learning and behavioral analysis as opposed to the traditional information security approach requiring human generated blacklists or whitelists. The machine learning and behavioral analysis platform learns each applications' proper SQL transaction behavior. Compromised credentials and rogue SQL statements, such as a SQL injection attack, will deviate from the established model and will raise an alarm as a database attack. Machine learning and behavioral analysis technologies have the ability to prevent advanced and zero-day database attacks without prior threat intelligence or the need to establish and maintain signature files of known attack strings.

== Products ==
DB Networks DBN-6300 was announced in October 2013 (originally referred to as the IDS-6300). The DBN-6300 is a 2U purpose-built database security appliance. It uses machine learning and behavioral analysis to identify database attacks in real-time. A virtual appliance version of the DBN-6300 was launched in February 2014, now referred to as the DBN-6300v.

The Layer 7 Database Sensor was launched in February 2016. The Layer 7 Database Sensor enables other information security product manufactures to integrate DB Networks database security technology into their products.

In March 2016, "insider threat" protection capabilities were added to the DBN-6300 and Layer 7 Database Sensor products.

== See also ==
- SQL
- Relational database
- Information security
- Digital forensics
- Code injection
- Cyberwarfare
