= Peregrine Systems =

Defunct American software company

Peregrine Systems, Inc.
- Industry: Computer software
- Founded: 1981; 45 years ago Irvine, California, U.S.
- Founders: Chris Cole; Gary Story; Ed Beck; Kevin Keyes; Richard Diederich
- Fate: Acquired by Hewlett-Packard in 2005
- Headquarters: San Diego, California, U.S.
- Products: IT Management Software

Peregrine Systems, Inc. was an enterprise software company, founded in 1981, that sold enterprise asset management, change management, and ITIL-based IT service management software. Following an accounting scandal and bankruptcy in 2003, Peregrine was acquired by Hewlett-Packard in 2005. Micro Focus which merged with the HP Software Division in 2017, later marketed the Peregrine products as part of its IT Service Management solutions. Micro Focus was acquired by OpenText in 2023.

== History ==
Peregrine Systems was founded in 1981 in Irvine, California. The founders and employees were Chris Cole, Gary Story, Ed Beck, Kevin Keyes and Richard Diederich. They started selling Peregrine Network Management System (PNMS) on a Series One computer while developing an MVS version. The MVS client/server solutions for PNMS became available in 1995.

In 1989, John Moores, founder of BMC Software and owner of the San Diego Padres Major League Baseball team, became a member of the Peregrine board of directors. He served as chairman from March 1990 through July 2000 and then again in 2002. He resigned from the board in 2003 during the company's bankruptcy filing. His involvement in the software industry continues today with investments through his venture capital firm JMI Equity. The legacy of his investments has been focused on ITSM software packages with the most recent investments made in ServiceNow.

Peregrine had offices in the Americas, Europe and Asia Pacific and grew its product line rapidly both organically and via acquisitions, including Harbinger Corporation in 2000, and Remedy Corporation in 2001.

== Fraud ==
In 2004, a federal grand jury issued an indictment charging eight former executives of Peregrine Systems, Inc., one former outside auditor of Peregrine, and two outside business partners of Peregrine, with conspiracy to commit a multibillion-dollar securities fraud. The case resulted from an investigation by the Federal Bureau of Investigation, and the Securities and Exchange Commission had pursued a parallel civil enforcement action.

In 2003, the U.S. Securities and Exchange Commission charged Peregrine with "massive financial fraud" for the purposes of inflating the company's revenue and stock price. Peregrine, without admitting or denying the allegations of the complaint, agreed to a partial settlement.

Peregrine filed suit against its auditor Arthur Andersen in 2002 for $1 billion in damages, for allegedly allowing incorrect audits that overstated revenues by as much as $250 million to be filed for the 2000-2002 fiscal years. In 2003, the former Peregrine CFO, Matthew Gless, pleaded guilty to fraud charges. In 2008, the former Peregrine CEO, Stephen Gardner, was sentenced to eight years and one month in prison for his role in the fraud, which resulted in bankruptcy for the company. Although former chairman of the board, John Moores, sold more than $800 million of shares during Peregrine's fraudulent period, the court of appeals determined that there was insufficient evidence that Moores knew about the fraud that led to the company's bankruptcy.

=== Sentences ===
- Stephen Gardner (former Peregrine CEO): 97 months in custody at the Federal Medical Center, Devens. Gardner died of a heart attack in July 2013 while in custody at FCI Cumberland.
- Douglas Powanda (former Peregrine Executive Vice President for World Wide Sales): 78 months in custody at the Federal Correctional Institution, Bastrop, followed by two years of supervised release.
- Matthew Gless (former Peregrine CFO): 63 months in custody followed by two years of supervised release.
- Jeremy Crook (former Peregrine General Manager for Europe): 27 months in custody.
- Andrew V. Cahill Jr. (former Peregrine Executive Vice President for World Wide Sales, after Powanda): 22 months in custody followed by two years of supervised release. Released from prison on October 22, 2010.
- Berdj Joseph Rassam (former Peregrine Controller): 19 months in custody followed by two years of supervised release.
- Larry Rodda (former managing director of KPMG Consulting): Six months in custody, six months of home detention, two years of supervised release and $100 mandatory special assessment.
- Richard Nelson (former Peregrine Corporate Counsel): One day in custody, six months home detention and 200 hours of community service.
- Ilse Cappel (former Peregrine Assistant Treasurer): Five years of probation.
- John Burnham Benjamin (former Peregrine Treasurer): Five years of probation.
- Steven Spitzer (former head of Peregrine's Alliance Sales Program): Three years probation, a $5,000 fine and 200 hours of community service plus a $110,000 civil penalty and barred from serving as an officer or director of any public company.
- Gary Lenz (former Peregrine President & COO): Three years of probation.
- Peter O'Brien (former Peregrine Director of Alliances): One year of probation.
- Michael Whitt (owner of Barnhill Management Group): Civil penalty of $60,000, six months in federal prison, and six months in home confinement.

Charges dismissed:

- Joseph Reichner (former Peregrine Vice President of Alliances)
- Patrick Towle (former Peregrine Revenue accounting manager)
- Dan Stulac (formerly led auditing team at Arthur Andersen)
- Eric Paul Deller (former Peregrine General Counsel)

== Bankruptcy ==
Peregrine filed for Chapter 11 protection on September 23, 2002, after laying off 1400 employees, or nearly half its workforce. When Peregrine filed for federal bankruptcy protection and eventually canceled its common stocks, more than $4 billion in shareholder equity was lost. After filing, the company sold the Remedy division of the company to BMC Software for more than $300 million. Peregrine exited Chapter 11 reorganization in August 2003, and the president and CEO, Gary Greenfield, left the company. Retired software executive John Mutch became president and CEO in August 2003.

== Sale to HP ==
Hewlett-Packard acquired Peregrine Systems in 2005 for $425 million. The Peregrine products are now sold as part of the HP IT Management Software (BTO) portfolio within the HP Software Division.

== Products ==
- AssetCenter - IT Enterprise asset management software (acquired from Apsylog). It is now sold as HP AssetManager software.
- ServiceCenter - ITIL-enabled IT service management software (developed internally, flagship service management offering). It is now sold as HP Service Manager software.
- Connect-It - Data integration tool. It is now sold as HP Connect-It software.
- Enterprise Discovery - Discovery and Inventory tool.
- Knowlix - Knowledge management application (acquired from Knowlix).
- InfraCenter for Workgroups – Integrated asset and help desk management software.
- InfraTools – Software tools for infrastructure management.
- Get-Services - Web-based application that lets employees create and manage change requests.
- Get-Resources (Get.Resources!) - Web-based application providing that lets employees request IT resources from a predefined catalog of items with automatic routing to the service desk.
- Get-Answers - Web-based knowledge management application (acquired from Knowlix).
- Get-IT (Get.IT!) – Employee self-procurement software.
- FacilityCenter - Computer-Aided Facilities Management (CAFM) product divested to TRIRIGA during financial collapse (acquired from Innovative Tech Systems as Span FM).
- FacilityCenter Reserve - Room Booking system divested to TRIRIGA during financial collapse (acquired from Critical Path). TRIRIGA was acquired by IBM; in June 2025, TRIRIGA product was replatformed and renamed Maximo Real Estate and Facilities as part of IBM Maximo Application Suite.
- Fleet Anywhere - Company vehicle fleet management software divested to Maximus in 2002. (acquired from Prototype).
- Rail Anywhere – Advanced and light rail management software for passenger and freight rail industries (acquired from based on software developed by KKO and applied to the Fleet Anywhere technology). (acquired from Prototype).
- Harbinger.Net - Supply chain enablement products sold to Golden Gate Capital during financial collapse (acquired from Harbinger). (acquired from Prototype).
- Extricity - e-commerce Business Process Management software sold to Golden Gate Capital in 2002 (acquired from Extricity).
- Remedy ARS (Action Request System) - Automated business process management and customer support software, sold to BMC in 2002. (acquired from Remedy Corp).
- TeleCenter – Software for managing telecommunications assets (acquired from Telco Research).
- TRU - Telecoms based product line, sold to Symphony Services Corp (acquired from Telco Research).
- Xanadu - IT infrastructure management appliance.
- Tivoli ServiceDesk - IT Service Management software, acquired from IBM.
