= HP IT Management Software =

Hewlett Packard enterprise software

HP IT Management Software is a family of Enterprise software products by OpenText as a result of the spin-merge of Hewlett Packard Enterprise's software assets with Micro Focus in 2017 and acquisition of Micro Focus by OpenText in 2023. The division was formerly owned by Hewlett Packard Enterprise, following the separation of Hewlett-Packard into HP Inc. and Hewlett Packard Enterprise in 2015. IT management software is a family of technology that helps companies manage their IT infrastructures, the people and the processes required to reap the greatest amount of responsiveness and effectiveness from today's multi-layered and highly complex data centers. Beginning in September 2005, HP purchased several software companies as part of a publicized, deliberate strategy to augment its catalog of IT management software offerings for large business customers. According to ZDNet and IDC, HP is the world's sixth largest software company.

HP IT Management Software was the largest category of software sold by the HP Software Division. The concept behind IT management software is that IT needs to support the business and be run as a business rather than a cost center. The discipline includes software to help businesses manage their IT portfolio and assets, gain greater quality from their IT, govern the processes of their IT and improve IT security, to name a few. According to ComputerWorld, IT management software is designed to help businesses align IT spend and resources based on business priorities. Other companies who develop and sell IT Management software include IBM, BMC Software, Borland, CA, and Compuware.

== IT Management Software products ==
OpenText sells several categories of software, including: business service management software, application lifecycle management software, mobile apps, big data and analytics, service and portfolio management software, automation and orchestration software, and enterprise security software. OpenText also provides Software as a service (SaaS), cloud computing solutions, and software services, including consulting, education, professional services, and support.

== User groups ==
Vivit Worldwide is the independent HP Software community, designed to help members to develop their expertise and careers through education, community and advocacy programs. For almost two decades, Vivit has been the independent, unbiased, trusted and field-tested community for thousands of HP Software customers, developers and partners from all areas of the world, business and industry. Vivit membership is free.

While it is not an actual "user group", the ITRC is an online forum about HP Software & Solutions products. A new HP user group, the HP Software Solutions Community, officially launched publicly in April 2010 and includes a number of former software-related communities.

In June 2011, HP Software announced a new Discover Performance community and online resource center designed to serve IT executives and CIOs.

== Software company acquisition timeline ==
- Oct. 2011: Autonomy Corporation, provider of enterprise search and knowledge management applications solutions
- Mar. 2011: Vertica Systems, analytic database management software
- Oct. 2010: ArcSight, security management software
- Aug. 2010: Stratavia, database and application automation software
- Aug. 2010: Fortify Software, software security assurance solutions
- May 2008: Tower Software, document and records management software
- January 2008: Exstream Software, variable data publishing software
- July 2007: Opsware, data center automation software
- June 2007: SPI Dynamics, Web applications security software
- February 2007: Bristol Technology, Inc., business transaction monitoring technologies
- February 2007: PolyServe, Inc., storage software for application and file serving utilities
- February 2006: OuterBay, archiving software for enterprise applications and databases
- November 2006: Mercury Interactive Corporation, application management and delivery and IT governance software
- December 2006: Bitfone, mobile device software
- November 2005: Trustgenix, Inc., federated identity management software
- September 2005: Peregrine Systems Inc., asset and service management software
- September 2005: AppIQ, open storage area network management and storage resource management technologies

== See also ==
- ITIL
- Service-oriented architecture
