= Maximo (software) =

Enterprise asset management software

Maximo Manage
- Developer: IBM
- Release: 1985; 41 years ago
- Stable release: 8.9 / November 2022; 4 years ago
- Website: www.ibm.com/products/maximo

Maximo is enterprise asset management software originally developed by Project Software & Development (later MRO Software) with the first commercial version released in 1985. Purchased by IBM in 2006, it was branded as IBM Maximo Asset Management. With the release of version 8 in July 2021 the product was renamed to IBM Maximo Manage.

Maximo is designed to assist an organisation in managing its assets such as buildings, vehicles, fire extinguishers, equipment recording details such as details, maintenance schedules and participating in workflows to manage the assets.

== History ==
Maximo was originally developed by Project Software & Development Inc (PSDI) which changed its name to MRO Software in 2000.

The product was acquired by IBM and placed in the Tivoli Portfolio. Previously the Tivoli portfolio contained software that was related to the Information Technology sphere; this acquisition brought management of non Information Technology assets into the portfolio.

Upon release 7.6, the program was given options to be deployed in a multitenant architecture with options for deployment to the cloud and delivery via a SaaS model. The program has traditionally been based on a character-based user experience known as the classic interface. Later versions have also provided a graphical interface referred to as Work Centers.

In 2020, IBM Maximo 8.0 was released. With it came the IBM Maximo Application Suite, integrating all licensed software and add-ons into one suite of applications. The suite included ViiBE integration, which was added in late 2021.

In 2025, IBM Maximo Application Suite 9.1 was released. This release provided a flexible licensing model using app points that are consumed when authorized or concurrent users login to maximo and access the applications available in the suite. IBM TRIRIGA was replatformed and renamed IBM Maximo Real Estate and Facilities, as part of the Maximo Application Suite 9.1 release.

== Architecture ==
Maximo originated as a stand-alone solution running on an IBM Personal Computer. As of April 2018, it is supported on specified versions of AIX, Linux and Windows Server, previously HP-UX and Solaris were also supported. Successive versions have developed to leverage newer technologies. Interfaces have been developed for automated interfacing feeds, integration with enterprise level database, resource and reporting tools.

Pre-configured models for some industries are available including rail, nuclear and mining. Software is also available to assist in the interfacing with other software packages and protocols.

== Disputes ==
In February 2018 Kalibrate Asset Management, a consultancy specializing in Maximo, sued IBM for 500,000 dollars in a deal registration dispute. This suit was dismissed by the court on 23 March 2018 as Kalibrate had failed to demonstrate it had a contractual right to the commission, nor had it established a claim for misleading and deceptive conduct. Subject to hearing from the parties, the judge proposed to order that Kalibrate pay IBM's costs of the proceeding, to be taxed on a standard basis failing agreement.
