= DSMC =

DSMC is an abbreviation for any of the following:

- Daniel Stewart's And Melville College, a private school in Edinburgh, Scotland
- Defense Systems Management College, a military acquisition training institution - part of the Defense Acquisition University
- Direct simulation Monte Carlo
- Distributed Storage Manager Client, the host based client portion of IBM Tivoli Storage Manager
- Digital Still and Motion Camera, a camera system by Red Digital Cinema Camera Company
- Data and Safety Monitoring Committee, see Data monitoring committee
- D.S. Senanayake College Media circle, see List of clubs and associations in DSSC
- Department of Sacred Music and Communications, a music organization of the Mar Thoma Syrian Church in Thiruvalla, Kerala India
