= Coradiant =

Former developer of web application software

Coradiant, Inc.
- Type: Private
- Founded: 2000; 26 years ago
- Headquarters: San Diego, CA, USA
- Key people: Brett Helm (former CEO and Chairman), Ali Hedayati (President)
- Products: TrueSight BI, TrueSight AIM, TrueSight WA, TrueSight Edge, End-User Experience Management
- Parent: BMC Software
- Website: http://www.coradiant.com/

Coradiant was an American software developer that developed products for managing and troubleshooting web applications. BMC Software acquired Coradiant on 28 April 2011 for $130 million in cash.

== History ==
=== Networkshop ===
Networkshop's logo

In 1997, Alistair Croll and Eric Packman founded Network shop in Montreal, Quebec, Canada. The company worked on highly available web infrastructures, published reports and studies on subjects such as load balancing and SSL Performance. It also added Jean-François Dumoulin as co-founder and that the company grew to roughly 15 employees.

As part of its research, Network shop developed a method for virtualizing the front-end infrastructure of web hosting systems. Working with a variety of firewall, load-balancer, switch, and cryptography vendors, the company deployed this shared infrastructure in a Montreal data center run by UUNET, and connected it to customers' servers within the same data center.

=== Coradiant founding ===
Coradiant's logo in 1999.

In late 1999, Cary Goldwax and Thanos Moschopoulos joined the company and renamed it Coradiant. The name was a reflection of the shared duties of running highly available web infrastructure, literally, "brilliant together."

The company, backed by seed funding from Brett Helm, started fundraising in early 2000 to expand the shared infrastructure model to other cities. In late 2000, the company signed a US$20M Series A financing, at the time the largest in Canadian history. The financing closed in early 2001. That year, the company also moved Canadian offices into larger space in Montreal's Windsor Station building.

=== Out-Smart management service ===
The company's headquarters moved from Montreal to Boston, Massachusetts, but engineering and product development remained in Montreal. Coradiant's virtualized infrastructure, dubbed "OutSmart", was deployed in a variety of data centers in North America belonging to Colo.com, Internap, Sprint, and others, and the company opened offices in San Francisco, New York, and London, England. Mike Chuli joined the company as CEO in mid-2001.

=== OutSight monitoring service ===
Coradiant's OutSight logo.

With the contraction of the dot-com and Application Service Provider sector, however, the financial advantages of shared infrastructure were no longer attractive; and Coradiant's OutSmart products could only be sold to tenants of data centers in which the virtual infrastructure was deployed. To address this, the company took its customer-facing management interface, known as OutSight, and made it available to customers who weren't in data centers in early 2002.

OutSight measured web application health from three perspectives: the end user (by passively monitoring HTTP connections); SNMP GETs to infrastructure components; and synthetic testing. The company continued to sell OutSight as a standalone offering until early 2004, and reduced its staff substantially as it got out of the application management business.

=== Development of True Sight ===
While OutSight was sold to customers successfully, it remained tethered to Coradiant's hosted management systems and was harder to sell to enterprises and security-sensitive buyers. As a result, in 2003 the company focused a core development team on a new, standalone product for measuring web performance. Called TrueSight, it was launched at Interop in 2004 and won the Best Of Show award. The company also won Best Of Show in 2005 for the introduction of the TrueSight TS-1100, the product's successor.

The company later introduced a data warehouse appliance, called TrueSight BI, that let customers better analyze user performance data against specific dimensions such as servers, users, and pages.

=== Recent history ===
Since that time, the company has continued to introduce products and technologies that measure end-user experience on web applications, letting IT organizations quickly find and fix web performance problems.

A June 2007 Forrester Research "Wave" report rated Coradiant as a leader in the Web application performance analysis subsegment and stated that "Coradiant’s End User Experience Monitoring Solution Shines In Web Application Analysis."

In 2008, Coradiant announced a partnership with Akamai Technologies to measure customer experience for users of Akamai's application delivery network. Earlier that year, the company introduced a machine learning system (dubbed "TrueSight AIM") that applied statistical methods to web traffic in order to identify and diagnose anomalies.

In 2009, Coradiant acquired Symphoniq Corporation, a maker of tools to track web transactions from end users.

In April 2011, Coradiant Inc. was acquired by BMC Software for total cash consideration of $130 million.

== See also ==
- BMC Software
- Compuware
- Tealeaf
- Quest Software
- Hewlett-Packard
- Computer Associates
