= IBM Tivoli Server-free backup =

IBM introduced Server-Free backup with IBM Tivoli Storage Manager 5.1 in 2002, for Windows 2000 servers only. Server-Free backup functionality (with DATAMOVER TYPE=SCSI) was included in IBM Tivoli Storage Manager version 5.1, 5.2, and 5.3, but not in 5.4 or later, but (DATAMOVER TYPE=NAS) was supported in 5.4 and later.

== SCSI-3 Extended Copy ==
Server-Free data movement uses the SCSI-3 EXTENDED COPY command and is carried out by a data mover device that exists on the SAN. It is the data mover device that is responsible for copying data, from a SAN-attached (client-owned) disk to a SAN-attached tape drive (server-owned), or vice versa.

From the T10 working group: "The EXTENDED COPY command provides a means to copy data from one set of logical units to another set of logical units or to the same set of logical units. The entity within a SCSI device that receives and performs the EXTENDED COPY command is called the copy manager. The copy manager is responsible for copying data from the source devices to the destination devices. The copy source and destination devices are logical units that may reside in different SCSI devices or the same SCSI device."
