= Governmentwide acquisition contracts =

Governmentwide acquisition contracts (known as GWAC) is the process by which agencies of the federal government purchase goods and services (procurement); these involve legal contracts between the agency and a private business. A GWAC is an acquisition tool that facilitates and streamlines the purchasing of IT solutions by United States federal government departments and agencies, while ensuring that the many government-mandated rules are followed. These rules are complex, deriving from laws and regulations that guide the purchasing processes of each agency. According to the GSA website, "A Governmentwide Acquisition Contract (GWAC) is a pre-competed, multiple-award, indefinite delivery, indefinite quantity (IDIQ) contract that agencies can use to buy total IT solutions, including both products and services." Federal agencies may create GWACs to support the work of the federal government. This has been done by the GSA, NIH (NITAAC ) and NASA (SEWP). A GWAC is not necessarily restricted to the agency that runs it (see the article on SEWP as an example). All IDIQs, including GWACs, are regulated by FAR, a set of rules and regulations that must be followed by federal agencies and resellers of goods and services (known as Contract Holders) to the government in the procurement process.
