= OpenText SiteScope =

Performance monitoring software

SiteScope is agentless monitoring software focused on monitoring the availability and performance of distributed IT infrastructures, including Servers, Network devices and services, Applications and application components, operating systems and various IT enterprise components.

SiteScope was originally written by Freshwater Software in 1996, a company acquired by Mercury Interactive in 2001. Mercury Interactive was subsequently acquired by Hewlett-Packard (HP) in 2006. Version 10.10 was released in July 2009. The current version is 2018.08 (11.51). SiteScope is now marketed by OpenText after its acquisition of Micro Focus.

SiteScope tests a web page or a series of web pages using synthetic monitoring. However, it is not limited to web applications and can be used to monitor database servers (Oracle Database, Microsoft SQL Server, etc.), Unix servers, Microsoft Windows servers and many other types of hardware and software. It can export the collected data in real time to OpenText LoadRunner or it can be used in standalone mode.

== SiteScope Monitor Types ==
SiteScope supports more than 100 types of application in physical and virtual environments and can monitor servers, databases, applications, networks, web transactions, streaming technology and integration technology, as well as generic elements including files, scripts and directories. SiteScope monitoring supports mid-tier processes, URLs, utilization of servers and response time of the mid-tier processes. Users can set thresholds for specific characteristics and be alerted for critical or warning conditions.

== Latest SiteScope Version Information ==
HPE Software merged with Micro Focus in September 2017 and Micro Focus was later acquired by OpenText in January 2023. The latest release of SiteScope is version 11.92.

=== Prepackaged Monitors ===
Prepackaged monitors include CPU Utilization Monitor, DNS Monitor, Directory Monitor, Disk Space Monitor, Log File Monitor, Memory Monitor, Network Monitor, Ping Monitor, Port Monitor, Script Monitor, Service Monitor, URL Monitor, URL List Monitor, URL Sequence Monitor, Web Server Monitor, WebLogic Application Server Monitor and threshold values.

=== Solution Templates ===
SiteScope comes with solution templates for monitoring IT infrastructure elements, including Oracle, Microsoft Exchange Server, SAP, WebLogic, and Unix and Linux operating systems. Solution templates are for rapidly deploying specific monitoring based on best practice methodologies.

Solution templates deploy a combination of standard SiteScope monitor types and solution-specific monitors with settings that are optimized for monitoring the availability, performance, and health of the target application or system. For example, the solutions for Microsoft Exchange monitoring include performance counter, event log, MAPI, and Exchange application specific monitor types.

=== Working with Solution Templates ===
The following is an overview of the steps for using Solution Templates in SiteScope.

- SiteScope templates are included free with purchase of Sitescope
- Enter the license into the SiteScope product using the General Preferences page.
- Open or create a monitor group into which you want to add the solution monitors
- Select the applicable Solution Template
- Complete the Solution Template form as indicated
- Configure alerts for newly created monitors
- Configure reports for the newly created monitors

Manage View

SiteScope 11.32 comes with Manage View component in HTML5 for monitoring IT infrastructure elements, The Manage view in the Unified Console provides Self-Service functionality (Monitoring as a Service) to non-admin users, and reduces the amount of monitoring support required from the SiteScope administrator or monitoring team. Manage UI provide mobility: support tablets, most commonly used browsers.
