= IDIQ =

US government procurement term

In U.S. Federal government contracting, IDIQ is an abbreviation of the term indefinite delivery/indefinite quantity. This is a type of contract that provides for an indefinite quantity of supplies or services during a fixed period of time. The legal origin of IDIQ contracts is the Federal Acquisition Regulation (FAR) section 16.504(a) (48 CFR 16.504). IDIQs are also sometimes called "Task Orders" or "Delivery Order Contracts." IDIQ contracts are a subtype of Indefinite Delivery Contract (IDC), which is a "vehicle that has been awarded to one or more vendors to facilitate the delivery of supply and service orders."

== Usage ==
IDIQ contracts are most often used for on-call service contracts, Architect-Engineering (A-E) services, and job order contracting. Awards are usually for a specified number of base years with renewal options for additional years. These contracts typically do not exceed a total of five years in duration. The government places delivery orders (for supplies) or task orders (for services) against a basic contract for individual requirements. Minimum and maximum quantity limits are specified in the basic contract as either number of units (for supplies) or as dollar values (for services). The government uses an IDIQ contract when it cannot predetermine, above a specified minimum, the precise quantities of supplies or services that it will require during the contract period. Exact dollar amounts for minimums must also be named.

Market research is involved before an IDIQ contract is awarded and there are program offices dedicated to the process. An IDIQ contract allows for a certain amount of contract process streamlining, as negotiations can be made only with the selected company (or companies), and such contracts are exempt from protest, per Federal Acquisition Regulations Subpart 33.

IDIQ contracts are frequently awarded by various U.S. government agencies, including the General Services Administration (GSA) and Department of Defense. They can be in the form of multi-agency contracts under the Government-Wide Acquisition Contracts (GWAC) system, or they may be government agency-specific contracts. In recent years, non-federal government entities have implemented the utilization of this terminology as it relates to task order contracts and job order contracting.

== History ==
For federal information technology contracts, the use of GWAC and IDIQ Multiple Award practices grew during and beyond the 1990s. Traditionally, products and services acquired via GSA-awarded contracts were resold by GSA throughout the federal government. For example, GSA resold long-distance telecommunications services, telephone equipment, and professional services, based on GSA IDIQ contracts with private-sector suppliers. Also, GSA oversaw information technology procurements conducted by other executive branch agencies. Each of those procurements was for use by the agency conducting the procurement. In the early 1990s, Information Resources Management Service commissioner Thomas J. Buckholtz proposed that GSA offer agencies opportunities to conduct their procurements so that all agencies could buy from the resulting contracts. By early 1993, twenty-four non-GSA projects were pursuing GWAC procurements. In 2006, a journalist estimated a total of $290 billion of then-current GWAC activity, including contracts still in use, procurements out to bid, and procurements being planned.
