= Brett Helm =

U.S. businessperson

- Born: Brett Christopher Helm; May 8, 1962 (age 64); Kansas City, Missouri, US
- Education: University of Utah (B.S. Engineering)
- Occupation: CEO of Glasswing.ai
- Known for: Serial entrepreneur, IPivot, Coradiant, At Home, DB Networks, Off-road motorcycle racing
- Title: CEO of Glasswing.ai and Chairman of Dragonfly Cyber

Brett Helm (born May 8, 1962) is a former United States Air Force officer and a prominent entrepreneur and investor. He served as a B-52 aviator during Operation Desert Storm and Desert Shield, earning several commendations, including several Air Medals. Transitioning to the tech industry, Helm co-founded and led multiple innovative companies, including iPivot, which was acquired by Intel. He has made significant investments in various startups and venture capital firms. Helm is an accomplished off-road motorcycle racer, winning multiple SCORE International championships and Baja 1000 events.

== Early life and education ==
Helm was born on May 8, 1962, in Kansas City, Missouri, US. He obtained his bachelor's degree in engineering from the University of Utah. He joined the USAF in 1988 and attended Officer Training School at Lackland Air Force Base. And in 1989, he graduated from flight training school at Mather Air Force Base. As a B-52 aviator, he flew 26 combat missions in Operations Desert Storm and Desert Shield. Throughout his USAF career, Helm was awarded numerous commendations, including several Air Medals for combat flying.

== Career ==
=== Entrepreneur ===
Helm began his career in the business startup sector as an early employee at US West INTERPRISE Network Services. He subsequently joined @Home Network as an early employee, where he played a key role in establishing @Work, serving as its vice president and general manager. In 1997, Helm co-founded and became CEO of iPivot, a company that was an early tech innovator. Intel acquired iPivot in 1999 for $500 million and appointed Helm as the general manager of their newly created Network Equipment Division.

In 2000, Helm invested in Sanera Systems and assisted the company in securing its first two rounds of funding. Sanera Systems was acquired by McData for $130 million in 2003. He also co-founded Coradiant, serving as an investor and board member. Although professionally funded in 2000, Helm did not become an employee of Coradiant until 2005. He agreed to an acquisition offer from BMC Software for $135 million and he is also a co-founder and investor in DB Networks.

In 2020, Helm led the acquisition of DB Network's assets to leverage its proven proprietary technology for the AI Discovery and AI Firewall market segments. Glasswing.ai was the first to market with a network (and cloud)-based AI Firewall.

Additionally, Helm serves as the Chairman of DragonflyCyber (DFC), which provides continuous measurement of cyber insurance mandates.

=== Investments ===
Helm invested in IPivot, Sanera Systems, Coradiant, DB network, DragonflyCyber, Glasswing.ai as well as multiple Venture Capital firms.

=== Technology ===
Helm and his companies have invented multiple products and technology categories used in enterprises around the world. IPivot Inc. invented Layer 7 load balancing and SSL middlebox technology, winning awards and the Grand Prize at Networld+Interop. Coradiant prioneered Web Application Performance Monitoring and Automated Identification which is the basis of BMC software Truesight Product line.

DB Networks developed several database technologies in the areas of discovery, security, and proprietary content discovery and classification. DragonflyCyber invented real-time automated measurement of cyber insurance mandates. Glasswing.ai created network-based AI firewalls and automated AI discovery, including an AI-curated list with continuous AI validation. While many patents were issued, Brett was granted a U.S. patent in 2022.

== Off-road motorcycle racing ==
Helm is an off-road motorcycle racer. Helm began racing competitively in 2005. He races in a class for riders over 40 years old. He won three SCORE International off-road racing championships in 2007, 2008, and 2010. He competed in and won three prestigious Baja 1000 (Class 40) events in 2007, 2008, 2009. He raced at the famous Bonneville Salt Flats on a dirt bike exceeding 130 mph.

=== Off-road racing record ===
Position	Year	Event	Class
5th	2005	Baja 1000	Class 40
4th	2006	San Felipe 250	Class 40
3rd	2006	Baja 500	Class 40
2nd	2006	Score Championship	Class 40
1st	2007	Baja 250	Class 40
1st	2007	Baja 500	Class 40
1st	2007	Baja 1000	Class 40
1st	2007	Score Championship	Class 40
1st	2007	2 HYR Glen Helen	Class 40
5th	2007	Vegas to Reno	Open Pro
1st	2008	Baja 250	Class 40
1st	2008	Baja 500	Class 40
1st	2008	Baja 1000	Class 40
1st	2008	Score Championship	Class 40
2nd	2009	San Felipe 250	Class 40
1st	2009	Baja 1000	Class 40
1st	2010	San Felipe 250	Class 40
1st	2010	Score Championship	Class 40

== See also ==
- Venture capital
- Startup company
- Entrepreneurship
- Angel investor
