= Robert Fabbio =

Robert A. "Bob" Fabbio
- Born: June 21, 1957 (age 69); Utica, New York
- Education: Mohawk Valley Community College (AAS); SUNY Potsdam (BS); Rochester Institute of Technology (MS)
- Known for: Founding and funding various high tech companies
- Notable work: Tivoli Systems
- Awards: Ernst & Young Entrepreneur of the Year Award, 1997; Forbes Midas List of the Top 100 Technology Venture Investors, 2002; Rochester Institute of Technology Innovation Hall of Fame, 2013.

Robert Fabbio (born June 21, 1957) is an American entrepreneur, technologist, and venture capitalist. He is best known for founding companies in and around Austin, Texas.

== Education ==
Fabbio received his AAS in chemistry from Mohawk Valley Community College, a BA in chemistry and computer science from State University of New York at Potsdam, and a MS in computer science and technology from the Rochester Institute of Technology.

== Career ==
In 1989, Fabbio founded Tivoli Systems , creators of the Tivoli Software suite; the company was acquired by IBM in 1996. In 1991, Fabbio founded DAZEL Corporation, acquired by Hewlett-Packard in 1999. He subsequently served as a Venture Partner for Austin Ventures, and as Managing Director of TL Ventures Inc.

He founded WhiteGlove Health in 2006, and eRelevance Corporation in 2013. Fabbio is also a partner at the Capital Factory, a startup incubator in Austin, Texas.

Fabbio also led the funding and was an active-Chairman of Agere Systems.

In addition, Fabbio held senior technical and executive management positions with Cesura, VIEO, IBM, Prime Computer, Applix, and Kodak. Fabbio also served as a Rochester Institute of Technology Board of Trustees member.
