= HP Service Manager =

Business software

OpenText Service Manager is one of the applications acquired by OpenText when it purchased Micro Focus in 2023. From 2017 to 2023, Service Manager was owned by Micro Focus, from 2005 to 2017 by HP, and prior to that by its original developer Peregrine Systems. The application was originally known as PNMS (Peregrine Network Management System). After releasing the first version of PNMS, Peregrine Systems eventually added functionality such as Request Management, Call Management, and Change Management and rebranded the application as Peregrine ServiceCenter.

It has had releases since the versions listed in the article, including the current version. In addition to this, Service Manager 9.80 brought over 30 new features and enhancements, such as new enhancements to the Activities feature, integration with Atlassian Jira, and support for new operating systems, databases and identity providers.

Service Manager 9.81, which was released after that, made Jira Data Center integration available, supported the PATCH HTTP method in the REST API framework, and implemented OAuth 2.0 code authentication for several Service Manager components and integrations.

== Acquisition ==
After the acquisition by HP, the application was rebranded as HP Service Manager and was included in the HP OpenView product suite. HP offers the application as a service desk solution that enables IT to work as a single organization, governed by a consistent set of processes to handle service delivery and support quickly and efficiently.

After the acquisition, the product has been updated with the following significant changes:

- ServiceCenter 3: Client and GUI
- ServiceCenter 4: Process Model and Module Alignment
- ServiceCenter 5 / 5.1: Client, GUI, introduction of Document Engine
- ServiceCenter 6: New Client, New Server-side Application stack (servlets), inclusion of JavaScript, inclusion of SOAP
- Service Manager 7 / 7.11: GUI, Web Client, Process Model (IIA)
- Service Manager 9.2: GUI, introduction of Process Designer
- Service Manager 9.40: Reporting, Smart Analytics.
- Service Manager 9.41: Smart Search, autocomplete, undo in ScriptLibrary editor
- Service Manager 9.50: New Service Portal, Smart Email, Smart Chat.
- Service Manager 9.72: Drop Internet Explorer 11 support, Microsoft Teams integration, ALM Octane integration, and Two-Factor Authentication (2FA) support.
- Service Manager 9.80: TLS 1.3 support, enhanced activity widgets, attachment visibility, and Smart Email notification improvements.
- Service Manager 9.81: PATCH REST API support and read-only record locking.

== Versions ==
Release name	Release date
Service Manager 7.0	September 2007
Service Manager 7.1	April 2009
Service Manager 9.2	May 2010
Service Manager 9.30	June 2011
Service Manager 9.31	October 2012
Service Manager 9.32	August 2013
Service Manager 9.33	January 2014
Service Manager 9.34	July 2014
Service Manager 9.40	December 2014
Service Manager 9.41	September 2015
Service Manager 9.50	November 2016
Service Manager 9.51	December 2016
Service Manager 9.63	July 2019
Service Manager 9.72.P1	May 2023

== Functionality ==
Service Manager is an ITSM Tool using the ITIL framework providing a web interface for corporate changes, releases and interactions (request fulfillment) supported by a Service catalog and CMDB. For a summary of the functionality, screenshots, data sheets, white papers and more information refer to the sources listed above.

== Propel ==
Propel was a separate web frontend providing a cut down view of HP Service Manager functions. This front end can be tailored to business requirements for service request, incident and change ticket management. Propel was obsoleted in 2017.
