= Harbinger Corporation =

American software company

- Company type: Public
- Traded as: Nasdaq: HRBC
- Industry: Software
- Founded: 1983
- Defunct: 2000
- Fate: Acquired by Peregrine Systems
- Successor: OpenText
- Headquarters: Atlanta, Georgia, USA
- Products: eCommerce software and services

Harbinger Corporation was a leader in e-commerce software and network services. Founded in December 1983 by C. Tycho Howle and David Leach as Computer Technologies for the Home in Atlanta, Georgia, it went public in August 1995. It was purchased by Peregrine Systems on 16 June 2000. Originally located at 1800 Century Place, the company relocated to 1055 Lenox Park Blvd. in the early 1990s.

At its peak, Harbinger had 1,100 employees, 40,000 active customers, and annual revenues exceeding $155 million.

After Peregrine went into bankruptcy following 2002 accounting scandals, certain lines of business purchased from Harbinger and Extricity were sold off to Golden Gate Capital and Cerberus Capital Management and ultimately renamed Inovis. For a while, Inovis' European operations used the name Harbinger Commerce.

The Harbinger brand became part of Inovis in 2002, which was then acquired by GXS in 2010.

GXS was later acquired by OpenText in 2013. OpenText later also acquired Micro Focus which included many former Peregrine Systems products in 2023.
