= AdStar =

Storage products subsidiary of IBM (1992–1995)

- Company type: Subsidiary
- Industry: Data storage
- Founded: 1992; 34 years ago
- Defunct: 1995
- Fate: Restructured
- Successor: IBM Storage Systems Division
- Key people: Ed Zschau, CEO
- Parent: International Business Machines

AdStar (an acronym for Advanced Storage and Retrieval) was a division of IBM that encompassed all the company's storage products including disk, tape and optical storage systems and storage software.

== History ==
In 1992 IBM combined their Storage Products businesses comprising eleven sites in eight countries into this division. On its creation, AdStar became the largest information storage business in the world. It had a revenue of $6.11 billion, of which $500 million were sales to other manufacturers (OEM sales), and generated a gross profit of about $440 million (before taxes and restructuring).

To provide additional autonomy—thereby further encouraging OEM sales—IBM established AdStar as a wholly owned subsidiary in April 1993, with outsider Ed Zschau as chairman and CEO. To some observers this appeared to be an admission by IBM that the storage subsidiary no longer provided a strategic advantage by providing proprietary devices for its mainframe products, and that it was being positioned to be sold off as a part of then the IBM chairman John Akers' business strategy. The replacement of Akers by Lou Gerstner in April 1993 changed the strategy from spinout to turnaround, but the disk drive business under Zschau continued to be troubled, declining to $3 billion in 1995.

Zschau left AdStar in October 1995, replaced by IBM insider Jim Vanderslice. The AdStar division was dismembered thereafter; the AdStar Distributed Storage Manager (ADSM) was renamed Tivoli Storage Manager in 1999, and the disk drive business component was sold off to Hitachi in 2003.
