= Andrew Cohen (businessman) =

Australian business executive (born 1977)

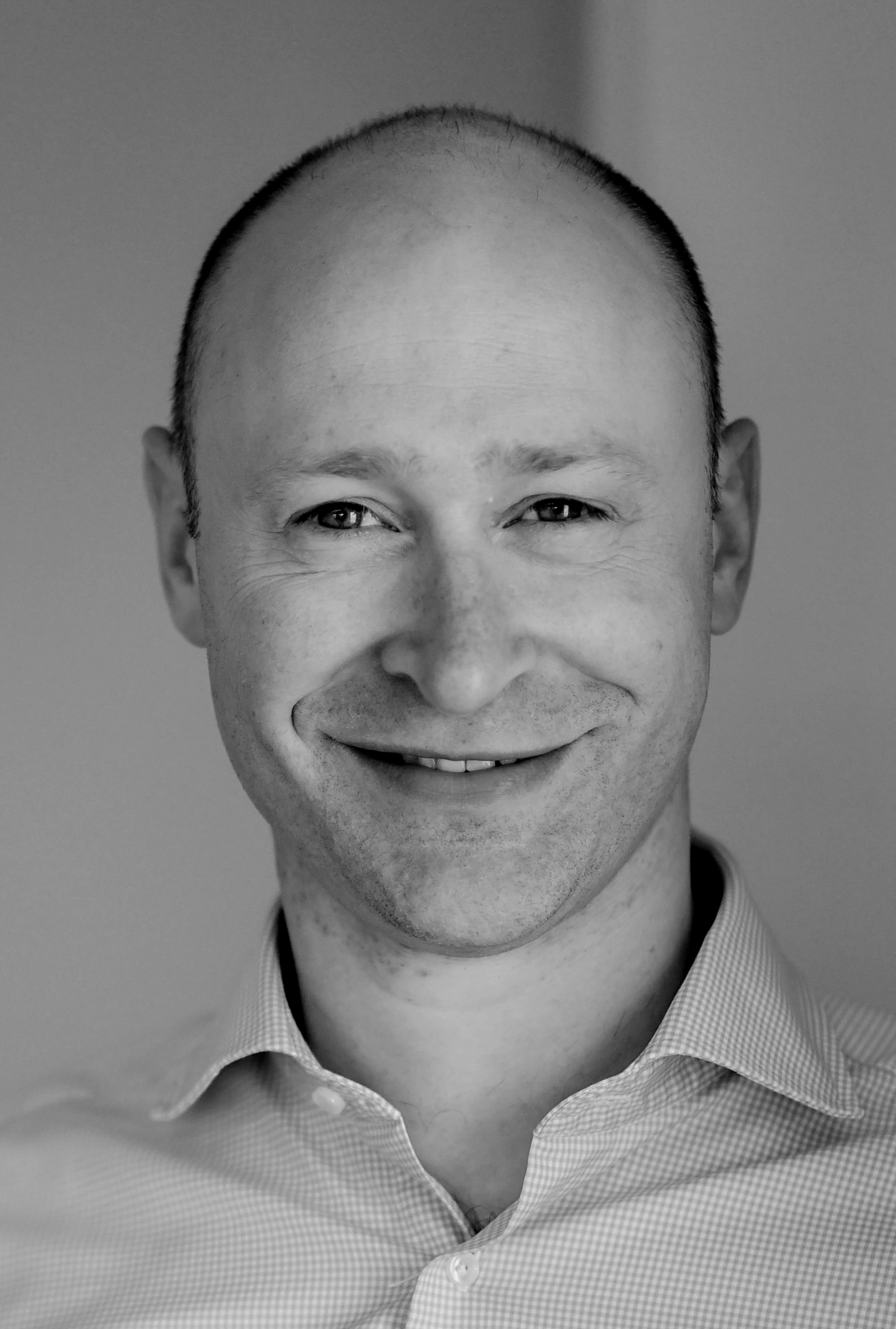
- Cohen in 2016
- Born: 1977 (age 47–48); Melbourne, Australia
- Education: University of Melbourne, Cambridge University
- Occupation: Businessman

Andrew Cohen (born 1977) is an Australian businessman and CEO of leading primary healthcare network ForHealth Group.

== Early life and education ==
Born in Melbourne in 1977, Cohen attended high school in Melbourne, before completing consecutive bachelor's degrees in arts (Philosophy) and Commerce (Finance and Accounting) at the University of Melbourne.

In 2005-06 he completed a full-time MBA at Cambridge University where he graduated first in his class.

== Career ==
Cohen joined management consultancy L.E.K. Consulting as a graduate in 2002 focused on Private Equity and Corporate Mergers and Acquisitions. He practiced across the firm's Australian and US offices and was sponsored to undertake a full-time MBA in 2005-06 before returning until 2008.

=== Bain and Company ===
From 2008 to 2016, Cohen worked at high-profile global management consultancy Bain & Company. In 2014 he was promoted to Partner in Bain's Melbourne office. He was a prominent advisor in the Retail and Consumer Products sector with a track record of business turn-arounds. His work in supporting the successful turnaround and sale of Swisse Vitamins for $1.7b in 2015 led to a senior executive position at Bellamy's Organic given a similar focus on the China market.

=== Bellamy's Organic ===
Cohen joined ASX200 Bellamy's Organic (ASX:BAL) in June 2016 as COO & Chief Strategic Officer. Six months later he was appointed acting CEO in January 2017, following the departure of former CEO Laura McBain and in the wake of sharemarket unrest, significant regulatory change and a slowdown in China demand. Bellamy's had faced a share price plunge in December and January, after flagging a significant drop in sales and earnings. An investor-led revolt followed, replacing the board of directors and senior management team.

In April 2017, with the appointment of John Ho of Hong Kong-based investor Janchor Partners to the board as a non-executive Director and later to chairman, Bellamy's confirmed Cohen as its permanent chief executive.

Over three years Cohen and his team led a high profile transformation of the Bellamy's business. Despite continued regulatory challenges, significant strategic and operational improvements were made. These included stronger revenues, a significant improvement in margins and profitability, a successful rebrand and product upgrade, a strong new product portfolio and a local, more agile and cost-effective supply-chain. In December 2019 China Mengniu Dairy (HKG:2319), a leading global dairy player, acquired Bellamy's Australia for $1.5 billion and it was officially removed from the ASX. During the three years shareholder value increased >3 times from a share price low of $4.14 in January 2017 to the effective offer price of $13.25 per share.

Cohen continued in the CEO and Managing Director role as an independent subsidiary of Mengniu Dairy before stepping down in September 2020 to pursue a new CEO role in partnership with Australia's largest Private Equity fund

=== ForHealth Group ===
Cohen was appointed CEO of ForHealth Group in November 2020 following a $500m buy-out of the Healius (ASX: HLS) Medical & Dental assets by BGH Capital.

ForHealth Group is the second largest primary care provider in Australia facilitating more than 7 million patient visits each year. The network spans more than 3,500 healthcare professionals and employees across a growing network of 85 large scale medical centres. Services include General Practice, Dental, Specialists, Allied Health, Women’s Health, Skin, Occupational Health, Urgent Care, Imaging, Pharmacy, and Pathology.

The mission of ForHealth is accessible healthcare for all Australians, and its site network is focused on low socio-economic and regional areas with health vulnerable populations.

Since acquisition Cohen and his team have acted as passionate advocates for this mission and changes to the sector, including changes to the bulk-billing incentive, workforce reform, and the establishment of Urgent Care and Priority Care clinics. ForHealth has also stepped into remote communities facing clinic closures and GP shortages when needed.

This sector change, combined with significant investment in facilities, technology, and people, has led to strong network and workforce growth, important new services (e.g. Women’s Health brand Evoca and LGBTIQA health brand Equality), and the leading Urgent Care Clinic network nationwide.
