= Tivoli Software =

Software company bought by IBM

- Formation: 1989
- Founder: Bob Fabbio
- Headquarters: Austin, Texas
- Products: Tivoli Software (product portfolio)
- Parent organization: IBM (from 1996)
- Website: https://www.ibm.com

Tivoli Software encompasses a set of products originally developed by Tivoli Systems Inc. IBM bought the company and ran the operation as its Tivoli Software division. Additional products were acquired and run under the Tivoli portfolio brand. IBM began phasing out use of the Tivoli brand in 2013 and by 2016 had moved the portfolio products into a revised and rebranded hierarchy.

== History ==
Logo of Tivoli Systems

Tivoli Systems Inc. was founded in Austin, Texas in 1989 by Bob Fabbio and quickly joined by Peter Valdes, Todd Smith and Steve Marcie; all were former IBM employees. Bob Fabbio in an interview indicated the purpose was to provide systems management on systems from a diverse set of vendors while at IBM he had been directed to focus on IBM products only. As an independent software vendor Tivoli Systems developed and sold Tivoli Management Environment (TME) "systems management" software and services. The then CEO Frank Moss saw the company listed on NASDAQ in March 1995 and the subsequent merger into IBM in 1996.

At the start of 2002, Tivoli Systems Inc, became Tivoli Software, a brand within IBM. IBM initially grew the software portfolio under the Tivoli brand through development and acquisition. There are some thoughts this may have resulted in the brand containing a large set of overlapping and marginal products In April 2013 IBM renamed "Tivoli Software" Division to "Cloud & Smarter Infrastructure". IBM moved away from the Tivoli brand as exemplified by the explicit rebranding of Tivoli Storage Manager to IBM Spectrum Protect and the renaming of IBM Tivoli Workload Scheduler to IBM Workload Scheduler as of release 9.3.

== Market position ==
According to IT analyst research firm Gartner, Inc., IBM in 2012 owned the largest share of the "IT Operations Management" software market, with an 18% market share. IBM was also the leading provider of Enterprise Asset Management software, for the 7th consecutive year, according to ARC Advisory Group, a research analyst firm for industry and infrastructure.

== Service management segments ==
Service management segments related to the Tivoli brand software and services included the following:

- Virtualization Management
- Storage Management
- IT Service Management
- Application Performance Management
- Network Management
- System and Workload Automation
- Server, Desktop, Mobile Device Management & Security
- Enterprise Asset Management
- Facilities Management

== List of IBM Tivoli products ==
Tivoli Product/Platform	Current name or Disposition	Comments
Tivoli Endpoint Manager		
Tivoli Identity Manager	IBM Verify Identity Governance	
Tivoli Access Manager	IBM Verify Identity Access	
Tivoli Management Framework/Tivoli Framework		
Tivoli Monitoring		
Tivoli Privacy Manager		
Tivoli Provisioning Manager		
Tivoli Service Automation Manager		
Tivoli Service Request Manager	IBM Control Desk	
Tivoli Storage Manager	IBM Storage Protect	
Tivoli Storage Manager FastBack		
Tivoli Storage Productivity Center	IBM Spectrum Control	
Maximo Asset Management		Enterprise Asset Management
Tivoli Netcool	IBM Netcool Operations Insight	
OMEGAMON		
TRIRIGA	IBM Maximo Real Estate and Facilities	Integrated Workplace Management System (IWMS)/ Connected Portfolio Intelligence Platforms (CPIP)

== Tivoli products and integration platforms ==
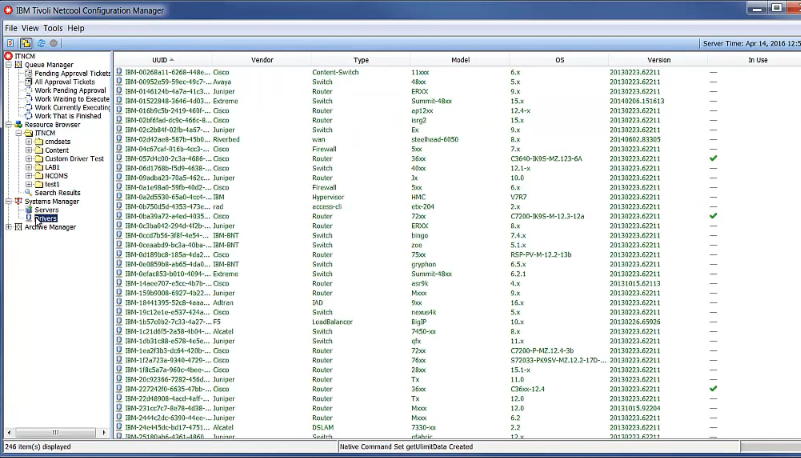
Creating custom standard drivers in IBM Tivoli Netcool Configuration Manager

=== Tivoli Management Framework ===
Tivoli Management Framework (TMF) is a CORBA-based systems and network management framework. It allows administrators to manage large numbers of remote locations or devices. In the early years of TMF's lifecycle it was a pre-requisite to several other key Tivoli components. With IBM's adoption and promotion of other non-TMF based products, such as Micromuse Netcool Omnibus in February 2006 and the increasing general acceptance of Secure Shell in preference to CORBA meant TMF entered the latter stages of product lifecycle. The final independent release version of TMF was 4.1.1 with release 4.3.1 supplied with and to Tivoli Configuration Manager 4.3.1 in 2008.

=== Tivoli Service Request Manager ===
Tivoli Service Request Manager manages configuration items (CI) and critical assets. It was previously known as Maximo Service Desk.

=== Netcool/OMNIbus ===
IBM Tivoli Netcool/OMNIbus operations management software consolidates complex IT and network operation management tasks as the primary event management platform within the suite.

== See also ==
- List of mergers and acquisitions by IBM
