= National Association of State Approving Agencies =

National Association of State Approving Agencies (NASAA) is a member association that facilitates the efforts of its member State Approving Agencies (SAAs) in the United States of America, to promote and safeguard quality education and training programs for veterans, ensuring greater education and training opportunities for veterans, and protecting the integrity of the GI Bill.

== Background ==
State Approving Agencies were created during the early days of the World War II "GI Bill of Rights". In 1948, the State Approving Agencies gathered to form the National Association of State Approving Agencies in order to coordinate their efforts nationwide. The NASAA assisted states in their efforts to do a better job for veteran-students and served as a tool to resolve mutual problems. NASAA and SAAs represent a State-Federal partnership that allows Federal interests to be pursued at the local level while preserving the identity, interests and sovereignty of States' rights in education. NASAA also has increased its influence in the realms of education and veterans benefits over the years, playing major roles in creation of new programs, such as the Montgomery GI Bill and the Post 9/11 GI Bill.

== Members ==
NASAA is made up of more than 50 state agencies nationwide that oversee education and training programs for veterans in their respective states. Some states have separate SAAs for different types of training, however most states have a single agency to evaluate, approve, and monitor education and training programs for use by GI Bill-eligible students.

== State Approving Agencies ==
The State Approving Agencies (SAA) are authorized by Title 38 of the United States Code. Each state has a SAA that is responsible for ensuring the quality and integrity of programs of education and training for the use of GI Bill benefits.

SAAs provide assistance to schools and training facilities that are approved or are seeking approval. SAAs' approval decisions are transmitted to the U.S. Department of Veterans Affairs so that VA can pay benefits when students enroll. SAAs play a major role in monitoring schools with approved programs to assure they continue to comply with state and federal law.

== Partners ==
NASAA partners with a large number Federal, Military and Veteran's Services organisations.
