= Encentuate =

Encentuate, Inc., was a privately held company that was started in Singapore in 2002, but eventually based in Redwood City, California before it was acquired by IBM in 2008. It developed an identity and access management software product focused on enterprise single sign-on and integration of strong authentication technology.

== Company history ==
The company was founded in 2002 in Singapore by Singaporean entrepreneur Peng Tsin Ong, who also previously founded Interwoven and co-founded Match.com. In March 2008, IBM acquired Encentuate and added its Identity and Access Management product suite to the Tivoli Software portfolio. IBM started the IBM Security Software Laboratory in Singapore at the same time, since the Encentuate development team was mainly based in Singapore. The product was re-branded and released in September 2008 as IBM Tivoli Access Manager for Enterprise Single Sign-On version 8.0.

Encentuate Logo (2002 - 2005)

Encentuate Logo (2005 - 2008)

== Awards ==
In 2006, Encentuate, Inc., received the "Hot Companies -- 2006" Award from Info Security Products Guide, published by Silicon Valley Communications.

Encentuate, Inc. also won the SC Magazine Awards for three consecutive years:

- 2006: Best Single Sign-on and Best Two-Factor Solution
- 2007: Best Identity Management Solution
- 2008: Best Identity Management Solution and Best Multi- and Second-factor Solution
