= RMAN =

Oracle backup and recovery manager

RMAN (Recovery Manager) is a backup and recovery manager supplied for Oracle databases (from version 8) created by the Oracle Corporation. It provides database backup, restore, and recovery capabilities addressing high availability and disaster recovery concerns. Oracle Corporation recommends RMAN as its preferred method for backup and recovery and has written command-line and graphical (via Oracle Enterprise Manager) interfaces for the product.

== Implementation ==
The designers of RMAN aimed at integration with Oracle database servers, providing block-level corruption detection during backup and restore processes. RMAN optimizes performance and space-consumption during backup with file multiplexing and backup-set compression; it integrates with Oracle Secure Backup and with third-party media management products for tape backup.

The syntax system of many commands and options allows database administrators to fine-tune the methods and performance of backups and restores of Oracle data and Oracle configuration information.

"Complete recovery" entails restoring all available consistent information to the most current time. "Incomplete recovery" options allow specifying restoration to a given time in the past. It can also restore a specific tablespace (group of database objects) or a specific table.

RMAN can use a defined "fast recovery area" (originally called the "flash recovery area") for backup and recovery data.
