= NASA SEWP =

NASA's Solutions for Enterprise-Wide Procurement (SEWP) is a United States Government-Wide Acquisition Contract (GWAC) authorized by the U.S. Office of Management and Budget (OMB) and managed by the National Aeronautics and Space Administration (NASA).

All federal agencies, including the Department of Defense (DOD), and government contractors are able to purchase ICT and AV solutions (equipment, software and services) from SEWP-authorized resellers (known as "Contract Holders"). In FY20, SEWP processed more than 46,000 new orders, allocating more than $9 billion from 90 cabinet-level and independent agencies, commissions, boards and other federal entities from over 1,300 sites around the world. Over 83% of FY20 spending through SEWP was secured by small business contracts.

Washington Technology rated NASA SEWP as one of nine contracts in the federal government which have "changed how the government buys technology". The article declares SEWP to be the "Gold Standard" in customer service and mentioned that SEWP assists industry as well as government users to ensure that the acquisition process flows smoothly. In Fiscal Year 2020, SEWP was the top-rated federal GWAC for IT purchases.

== Role in Federal Procurement ==
The SEWP Program Office manages a suite of government-wide ICT and AV products and services contracts that enable NASA and all federal agencies to achieve their missions and strategic initiatives by providing streamlined access to critical technologies and solutions. The program provides best value for the federal government and American taxpayers through innovative procurement processes, premier customer service and outreach, acquisition insight, and partnership with government entities and industry.

== History ==
The SEWP acronym originally (1993) referred to "Scientific and Engineering Workstation Procurement". In 2007, the full name was changed to "Solutions for Enterprise-Wide Procurement", pronounced 'soup', which allowed the same acronym to be maintained. NASA SEWP provides a wide array of ICT and AV products as well as product related services dealing with Information Technology & Computer Networking, Software & Cloud Computing, Wireless & Mobile technology, supporting technology, AV/conferencing technology and solutions, and a variety of related services for planning and installation, engineering and training, and IT consulting and system design. A full scope of products and services are found on the organization's website.

As of 2020, the contract offered more than 3 million products, services, and solutions from more than 8000 providers.

NASA SEWP was the first GWAC in the Federal Acquisition arena; the original contract was awarded in 1993. SEWP II was awarded in 1996, SEWP III in 2001, SEWP IV in May 2007 and SEWP V in May 2015. SEWP VI was scheduled to begin May 2025, but has been delayed (see below).

Initially (1993), the contract provided technical- and engineering-related ICT and AV products but associated services were not included. As the technology sector and the contracts evolved, firm fixed-price services became available through the contracts. Thus, the acronym definition was changed in 2007 to Solutions for Enterprise Wide Procurement. SEWP's mascot is a rubber duck floating in a bowl of soup, signifying the organization's intention to make procurement "as easy as duck soup".

=== SEWP V and SEWP VI ===
SEWP V was expected to end 30 April 2026, but it is being extended through the end of January 2027. With the addition of BPAs, SEWP V's offerings reflect changes to the federal government's FAR regulations.

SEWP VI will have many more Contract Holders, and features expanded offerings, including two new categories, enterprise solutions and IT services, in addition to IT products (with associated services) which were available in SEWP V. The launch of SEWP VI has been delayed, at least in part by bid protests by potential Contract Holders.

SEWP VI will launch on 1 November 2026, and have a 10 year period of performance.
