= Tivoli Service Automation Manager =

Cloud management package from IBM

Tivoli Service Automation Manager is the Cloud management package from IBM in the Tivoli Software brand. Unofficial abbreviations are TSAM and TivSAM.

As the product sheet sells it: "IBM Tivoli Service Automation Manager enables users to request, deploy, monitor and manage cloud computing services. It also provides traceable approvals and processes."

The main use of TSAM is to automate technical as well as business processes involved in deploying new IT services. It is an intermediate between a user with a service request, and a hypervisor that manages some hardware resource pool on which the service will run.

TSAM consists of various components, some of which are separate IBM products:

- A REST Web 2.0 API, on which the Self-Service Graphical User Interface, and the administrative StartCenters, are built.
- Tivoli Service Request Manager
- Tivoli Process Automation Engine. This is an incarnation of a central component of the Maximo (MRO) asset and workflow management application that IBM acquired in 2006.
- Tivoli Provisioning Manager, the application that runs workflows to automate deployment of software.

TSAM maintains a large collection of objects and their attributes, which forms its Data Center Model that is stored in a separate database.

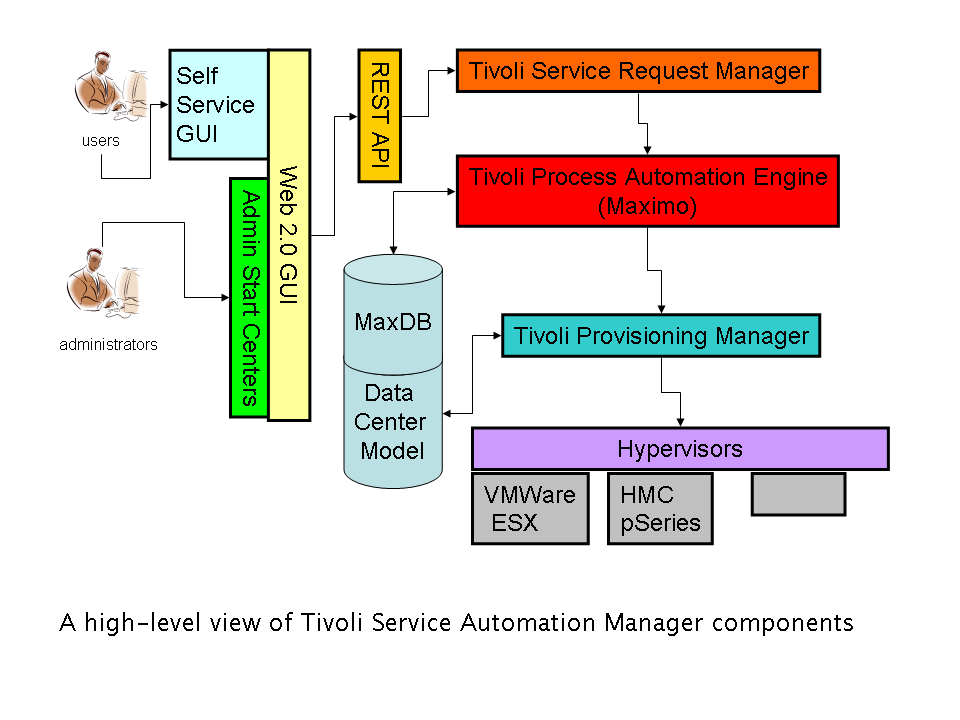

== See also ==
- Tivoli Software

== External sources ==
- IBM's product page: http://www-01.ibm.com/software/tivoli/products/service-auto-mgr/
- Review of the 7.1 release (2009): http://www.enterprisemanagement.com/research/asset.php?id=1125
- News items on IBM's Cloud offerings (2009): http://www.eweekeurope.co.uk/news/news-it-infrastructure/ibm-embraces-corporate-cloud-1140 ; http://www.eweekeurope.co.uk/news/news-cloud-computing/ibm-releases-more-cloud-computing-tech-2001
- Tivoli community Cloud focus: http://www.tivoli-ug.org/communityfocus?page=c_focus_automation
