= John Ho =

Australian businessman

- Born: 1976 (age 49–50); Hong Kong
- Education: University of New South Wales
- Occupation: Executive

John Ho (born 1976) is an Australian business executive. Chief Industrialist Investor of Janchor Partners Limited.

== Early life and education ==
Born in Hong Kong, Ho migrated to Australia with his parents at age 12, completing his secondary education at James Ruse Agricultural High School in Carlingford, NSW. Ho attended the University of New South Wales, and holds a Bachelor of Science in mathematics and a Bachelor of Commerce in finance (First Class Honours and University Medal). Ho also served as an associate lecturer in the School of Banking and Finance at UNSW from 1998 to 2000.

== Career ==
After graduating from UNSW, Ho joined Boston Consulting Group as a consultant in 2000, initially in Sydney, before relocating to the firm's Chicago office. In 2003, Ho joined Citadel as a senior analyst, before relocating in 2004 to Hong Kong.

From 2004 to 2009, Ho served as director and head of Asia investing for The Children's Investment Fund, and from 2005 to 2009 as non-executive director of Link REIT.

In 2009, Ho founded global equity manager Janchor Partners. Janchor Partners, with over US$5 billion invested in the Asia-Pacific region, is a long-term industrialist investor in companies with fundamental long-term value creation potential. Janchor Partners, an early backer of Chinese online marketplace Alibaba, has owned a number of healthcare companies in Australia including Medibank Private, as well as interests in freight group Aurizon, and document management company Iron Mountain. Janchor Partners was a lead investor in Chinese TechFin company Ant Financial's $14 billion funding round in June 2018.

From 2014 to 2019, Ho was appointed to the Hong Kong Stock Exchange Listing Committee, where he served as deputy chairman. He was also a committee member of the Securities and Futures Commission's Public Shareholders Group from 2015 to 2021. In 2014, Ho also joined the board of digital marketing firm Rokt as a non-executive director.

From 2017 to 2019, Ho was a non-executive director and chairman of Bellamy's Australia, in which Janchor Partners had a 7.7% interest in April 2017. The company was ultimately sold to Mengniu Dairy Group.

From 2018 to 2021, Ho sat on the board of Vocus Group as a non-executive director.

In July 2021, Ho joined the board of Avepoint, Inc., the largest independent software vendor of SaaS solutions to migrate, manage and protect data in Microsoft 365, as a non-executive director.

In March 2023, Ho joined the board of Incitec Pivot Limited, an industrial explosive and fertilizer company, as a non-executive director.
