= LAN-free backup =

A LAN-free backup is a backup of server data to a shared, central storage device without sending the data over the local area network (LAN). It is usually achieved by using a storage area network (SAN).

Note that trivial backup to a dedicated, unshared storage device (such as local tape drive) does not meet the definition.

== Technical aspects ==
The goal of LAN-free backup is to reduce the load on LAN and reduce the time it takes to complete the backup. It offers an alternative way of backup than a simple data copy to network-attached storage (NAS) over LAN.

It comes in different flavours:

- with backup server: in addition to a shared storage device (usually a traditional tape library), there exists a central server arbitrating access to device (for all the other SAN servers). The central server however, does not handle data stream itself.
- without backup server: the storage facility (usually a virtual tape library, or VTL) is smart enough to handle multiple data accesses without intermediate component.

== See also ==
- Data backup
- Storage area network
- Network-attached storage
- Fiber Channel technology
