= National Association for Sustainable Agriculture Australia =

The National Association for Sustainable Agriculture, Australia (NASAA) is an Australian and international organic certifying agency and trade association, located in Stirling, South Australia.

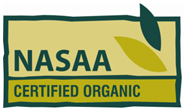
NASAA logo

== Background ==
Formed in 1986, the National Association for Sustainable Agriculture, Australia (NASAA) is a non-profit membership based association, whose charter is "to support the education of industry and consumers on organic, biodynamic and sustainable agricultural practices". The scope of NASAA's standard covers the organic supply chain, including input manufacturers, producers, processors, and wholesale and retail operations. NASAA was the first organic certification entity in Australia, it was also one of the first certifiers in the world to be accredited by the International Federation of Organic Agriculture Movements (IFOAM). It certifies production and processing operations in 10 countries globally, including Australia, Indonesia, Malaysia, Nepal, Papua New Guinea, Samoa, Singapore, Solomon Islands, Sri Lanka, and USA.

== Accreditations ==
NASAA offers organic certification to a number of Australian and international standards via its certification arm NASAA Certified Organic (NCO). NCO is nationally audited and accredited under the Australian Department of Agriculture and Water Resources (DAWR) Organic and Bio-dynamic Program.

NCO is also accredited by the United States Department of Agriculture (USDA) to carry out organic certification services under that country’s National Organic Program (NOP), and by the Ministry of Agriculture, Forestry and Fisheries (Japan) to offer certification to operators who are compliant with the Japanese Agricultural Standard (JAS).

IFOAM accredited NCO in seven categories of organic certification: Aquaculture, Certification Transference, Crop production, Grower groups, livestock, Processing and handling, and Wild products.

== Publications ==
- NASAA Organic Standard – for Primary Production, Manufacturing & Distribution
- NASAA Organic Trader Standard - Retail, Restaurants & Markets
