= AvePoint =

American software vendor

AvePoint, Inc.
- Type: Public
- Traded as: Nasdaq: AVPT; S&P 600 component
- Industry: Computer software
- Founded: 2001; 25 years ago
- Founder: Xunkai (Kai) Gong; Tianyi (TJ) Jiang
- Headquarters: Jersey City, New Jersey, United States
- Key people: Xunkai (Kai) Gong (executive chairman); Tianyi (TJ) Jiang (CEO)
- Products: AvePoint Confidence Platform
- Revenue: ▲$419.5 Million (2025)
- Net income: ▲US$34.8 million (2025)
- Number of employees: ~2,800 (2025)
- Website: https://www.avepoint.com

AvePoint is a public company headquartered in Jersey City, New Jersey, United States. It develops software products intended to add features or security to other major platforms, like Microsoft 365, Google, or Salesforce. AvePoint was founded in 2001 and went public on NASDAQ in 2020.

== History ==
The company was backed by investors Goldman Sachs and Summit Partners, which acquired minority stakes in AvePoint in 2014 and 2007, respectively.

In January, 2020 the company announced a $200 million Series C investment led by TPG Sixth Street Partners, with additional participation from prior investor Goldman Sachs and other unnamed investors. The round brought the total raised to $294 million to date.

In November 2020, AvePoint reached a deal to go public through a merger with blank-check company Apex Technology Acquisition Corp.(APXT). The transaction valued AvePoint at $2 billion and kept AvePoint co-founders Tianyi Jiang and Kai Gong as CEO and Executive Chairman respectively.
