= Accounting irregularity =

Improper entry, omission or statement

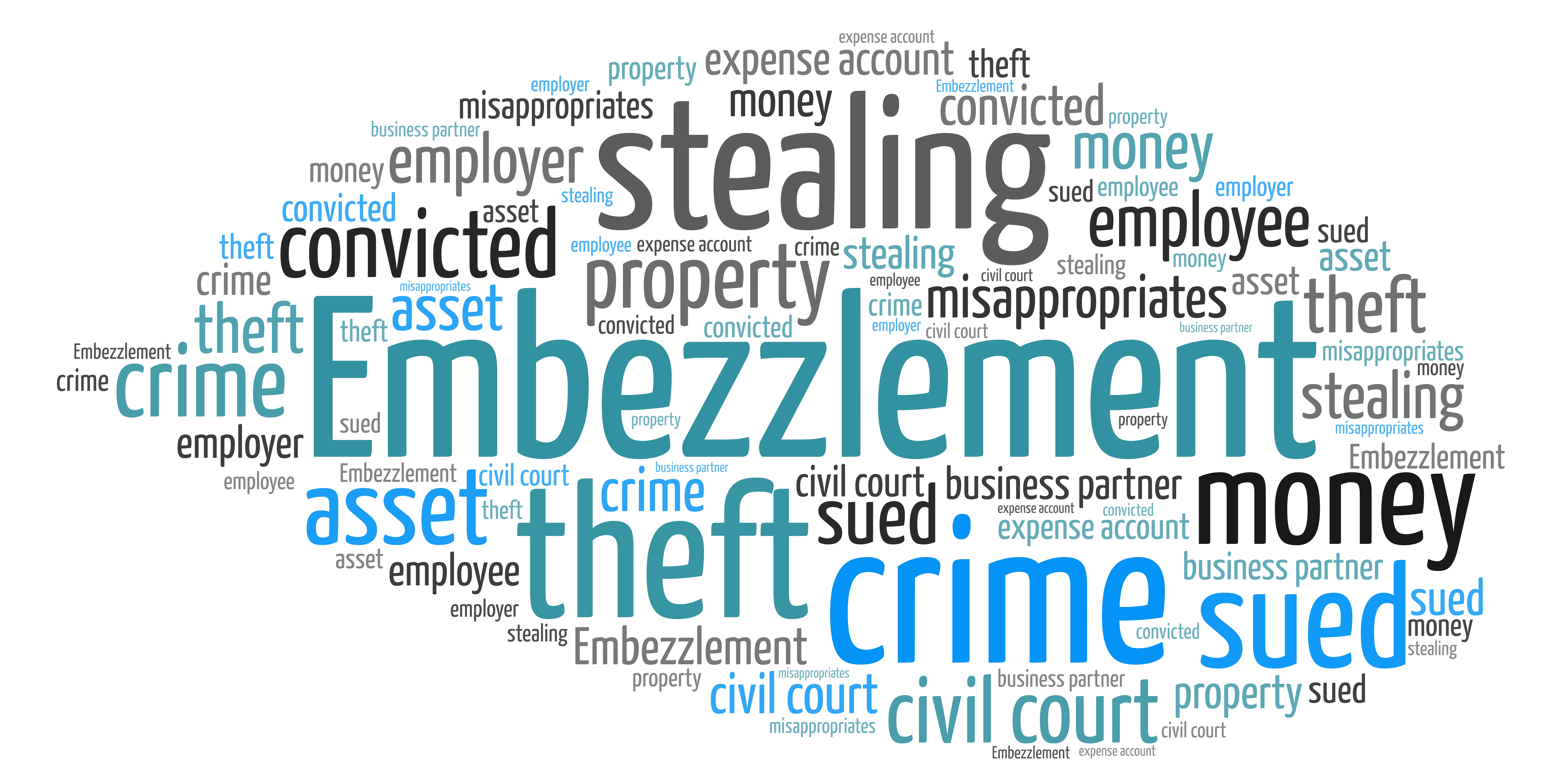

An accounting irregularity is an entry or statement that does not conform to the normal laws, practises and rules of the accounting profession, having the deliberate intent to deceive or defraud. Accounting irregularities can consist of intentionally misstating amounts and other information in financial statements, or omitting information required to be disclosed. Financial misstatements would cause huge losses for investors. More irregularities are found in companies with higher incentives. Accounting irregularities are often committed as a means to an end. For example, assets misappropriations may be concealed by using irregular accounting entries and profit overstatements may inflate the year end bonuses to offender. Offender may falsify the company performance to conceal low productivity and enhanced stock price. Accounting irregularities are commonly distinguished from unintentional mistakes or errors. The misstatements could cause significant concern about the quality of the firm's financial reports.
