= IBM OMEGAMON =

OMEGAMON, later IBM Tivoli OMEGAMON XE, is a software family of performance monitors for IBM zEnterprise computer environments. These products were originally written, marketed, sold and maintained by Candle Corporation, which was acquired by IBM in 2004. The OMEGAMON product family provides analysis of IBM mainframe operating systems such as z/OS and z/VM and various sub-systems such as CICS, DB2 and IMS.

There are 9 products in the IBM Tivoli OMEGAMON family:

- IBM Tivoli OMEGAMON XE for z/OS V5
- IBM Tivoli OMEGAMON XE for CICS on z/OS V5
- IBM Tivoli OMEGAMON XE for IMS on z/OS V5
- IBM Tivoli OMEGAMON XE for DB2 Performance Monitor for z/OS V5
- IBM Tivoli OMEGAMON XE for DB2 Performance Expert for z/OS V5
- IBM Tivoli OMEGAMON XE for Mainframe Networks V5
- IBM Tivoli OMEGAMON XE for Storage on z/OS V5
- IBM Tivoli OMEGAMON XE for Messaging for z/OS V5
- IBM Tivoli OMEGAMON XE for z/VM and Linux V4

Version 5 of the OMEGAMON family of products shipped in 2012 and included a new Enhanced 3270 User Interface with new user customization options and built-in problem solving scenarios.
