= Organic infant formula =

Organic infant formulas are synthetic substitutes to natural breast milk.

== United States requirements ==
Organic formulas manufactured in the United States must meet specific conditions regulated by the United States Department of Agriculture, the Agricultural Marketing Services and the National Organic Program. The system of organic production is managed in accordance with the Organic Foods Production Act of 1990 (OFPA) and regulations in Title 7, Part 205 of the Code of Federal Regulations. All three programs are designed to accredit state agencies and authorize businesses to certify producers and handlers of agricultural goods that operate according to the National Organic Program's regulations—such as enforcing the OFPA and Federal Title7, Part 205) as organic.

Organic infant formulas are manufactured with all production aspects certified as organic, including vitamins, cow's milk, sugar and the cleanliness of machines and of handlers.
