= Telstra Business Awards =

Awards category in Australia

- Awarded for: Recognising excellence, innovation and best practice in Australia
- Location: Australia
- Presented by: Telstra
- First award: 1992
- Website: Telstra Business Awards

The Telstra Business Awards is an independent awards program designed to recognise and promote excellence, best practices and innovations in the business community.

Categories that the awards cover annually include: Accelerating Women, Building Communities, Championing Health, Embracing Innovation, Indigenous Excellence, Outstanding Growth and Promoting Sustainability.
