= Enterprise asset management =

Managing the maintenance of physical assets

Enterprise asset management (EAM) involves the management of the maintenance of physical assets of an organization throughout each asset's lifecycle. EAM is used to plan, optimize, execute, and track the needed maintenance activities with the associated priorities, skills, materials, tools, and information. This covers the design, construction, commissioning, operations, maintenance and decommissioning or replacement of plant, equipment and facilities. The goal of EAM is to maximize the value and efficiency of these assets while minimizing associated costs and risks.

"Enterprise" refers to the scope of the assets in an Enterprise across departments, locations, facilities and, potentially, supporting business functions. Various assets are managed by the modern enterprises at present. The assets may be fixed assets like buildings, plants, machineries or moving assets like vehicles, ships, moving equipments etc. The lifecycle management of the high value physical assets require regressive planning and execution of the work.

== History ==
EAM arose as an extension of the computerized maintenance management system (CMMS) which is usually defined as a system for the computerisation of the maintenance of physical assets.

== Enterprise asset management software ==
Enterprise asset management software is a computer software that handles every aspect of running a public works or asset-intensive organization. Enterprise asset management (EAM) software applications include features such as asset life-cycle management, preventive maintenance scheduling, warranty management, integrated mobile wireless handheld options and portal-based software interface. Rapid development and availability of mobile devices also affected EAM software which now often supports mobile enterprise asset management.

== Sources ==
- Baird, Gregory M. (2011). "Defining Public Asset Management for Municipal Water Utilities". Journal - American Water Works Association. 103 (5): 30–38. doi:10.1002/j.1551-8833.2011.tb11449.x. S2CID 167652876.
- Physical Asset Management (Springer publication) Nicholas Anthony John, 2010.
- Pascual, R. "El Arte de Mantener", Pontificia Universidad Católica de Chile, Santiago, Chile, 2015.
