= BMC Software =

American enterprise software company

BMC Software, Inc.

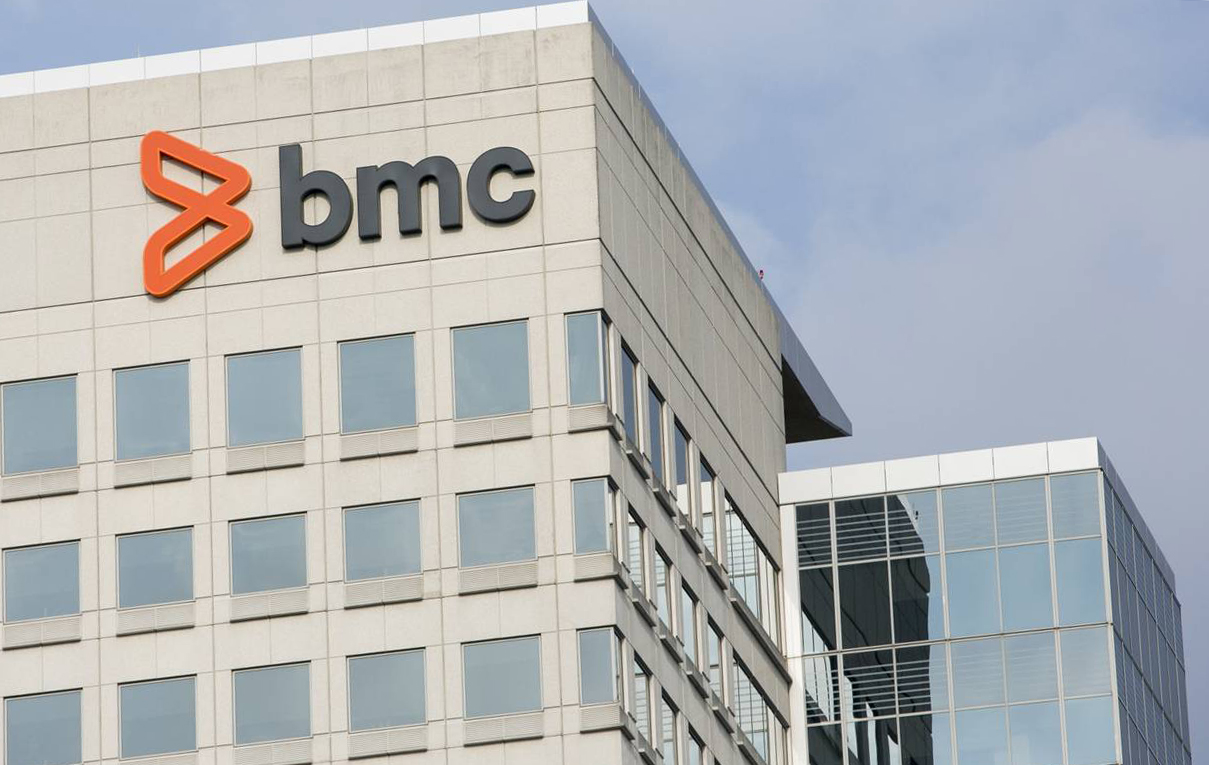
- Type: Private
- Industry: Information technology Consulting; Enterprise software
- Founded: September 1980; 46 years ago
- Founder: John Moores; Dan Cloer; Scott Boulette
- Headquarters: Houston, Texas, United States
- Area served: Worldwide
- Key people: Ayman Sayed (CEO)
- Products: Software; IT service management Cloud computing Artificial intelligence SaaS
- Revenue: $2.1 billion (2021)
- Owner: KKR
- Number of employees: 6,000 (2020)
- Website: www.bmc.com

BMC Software, Inc. is an American multinational information technology (IT) services and consulting, and enterprise software company. In 2025, the company's Helix product was spun off into the independent IT service and operations-focused company, BMC Helix.

== History ==
The company was founded in Houston, Texas, by former Shell employees Scott Boulette, John Moores, and Dan Cloer, whose surname initials were adopted as the company name BMC Software. Moores was the company's first CEO. Initially, the firm primarily wrote software for IBM mainframe computers, the industry standard at the time.

In 1987, Moores was succeeded by Richard A. Hosley II as CEO and President. In July 1988, BMC was re-incorporated in Delaware and went public with an initial public offering for BMC stock. The first day of trading was August 12, 1988. BMC stock was originally traded on the Nasdaq under the symbol BMCS and later on the New York Stock Exchange with symbol BMC.

Hosley was succeeded by Max Watson Jr. in April 1990. Watson Jr. was chairman and CEO until January 2001. After Watson resigned, BMC appointed the company director, Garland Cupp, as chairman. Cupp was succeeded as chairman and CEO by BMC's former senior vice president of product management and development, Robert Beauchamp.

On April 29, 2004, BMC Software Inc. announced that it was acquiring Marimba, Inc. for $239 million in cash. Following the acquisition, BMC planned to expand its "Remedy" product line using Marimba's configuration management software.

In October 2009, BMC Software Inc. announced that it was acquiring Tideway Systems Ltd., which provides data center management software, for an undisclosed price.

In May 2013, BMC announced that it was being acquired by a group of major private equity investment groups for $6.9 billion. The transfer was completed in September 2013 and the company was no longer publicly traded.

In December 2016, Peter Leav succeeded Beauchamp as president and CEO. In October 2019, Ayman Sayed was named as President and CEO.

In October 2024, BMC announced that it was splitting into two separate organizations: BMC Software and BMC Helix. BMC Software remains the name of the company that includes the Intelligent Z Optimization and Transformation (IZOT) and Digital Business Automation (DBA) business units.

In 2026, it was announced that Montagu Private Equity would acquire a majority stake in BMC Helix through a carve-out transaction from BMC Software.

== Products and services ==
BMC Software provides support for enterprise mainframes with its Automated Mainframe Intelligence (AMI) product line. AMI use machine learning to attempt to improve efficiency.

BMC's Control-M software allows businesses to run high-volume batch processing to optimize complex business operations, such as supply chain management. Users can access these batch jobs through a graphical interface.

In 2019, the firm announced plans to make the program available in a Docker container to simplify deployment. In 2020, the firm launched an SaaS-based version of Control-M.

Helix, formerly known as Remedy, was the company's IT service management business unit. In 2025, the company's Helix product was spun off into the independent IT service and operations-focused company, BMC Helix.

== Litigation ==
In 2022, BMC won a lawsuit against IBM for "fraudulently inducing and then violating a software licensing agreement", and was awarded over $1.6 billion in damages. This was then overturned by the 5th U.S. Circuit Court of Appeals in New Orleans, stating that "a lower court judge's determination concerning liability was in error." The three-judge panel, U.S. Circuit Judge Edith Jones said AT&T, one of BMC's biggest clients, had switched to IBM software "independently" and that BMC had "lost out to IBM fair and square".

== See also ==
- List of companies in Houston
- Remedy Corp
