= HP Inc. =

American information technology corporation

Coordinates: 37.4111842°N 122.1476929°W

- Logo used since March 2025

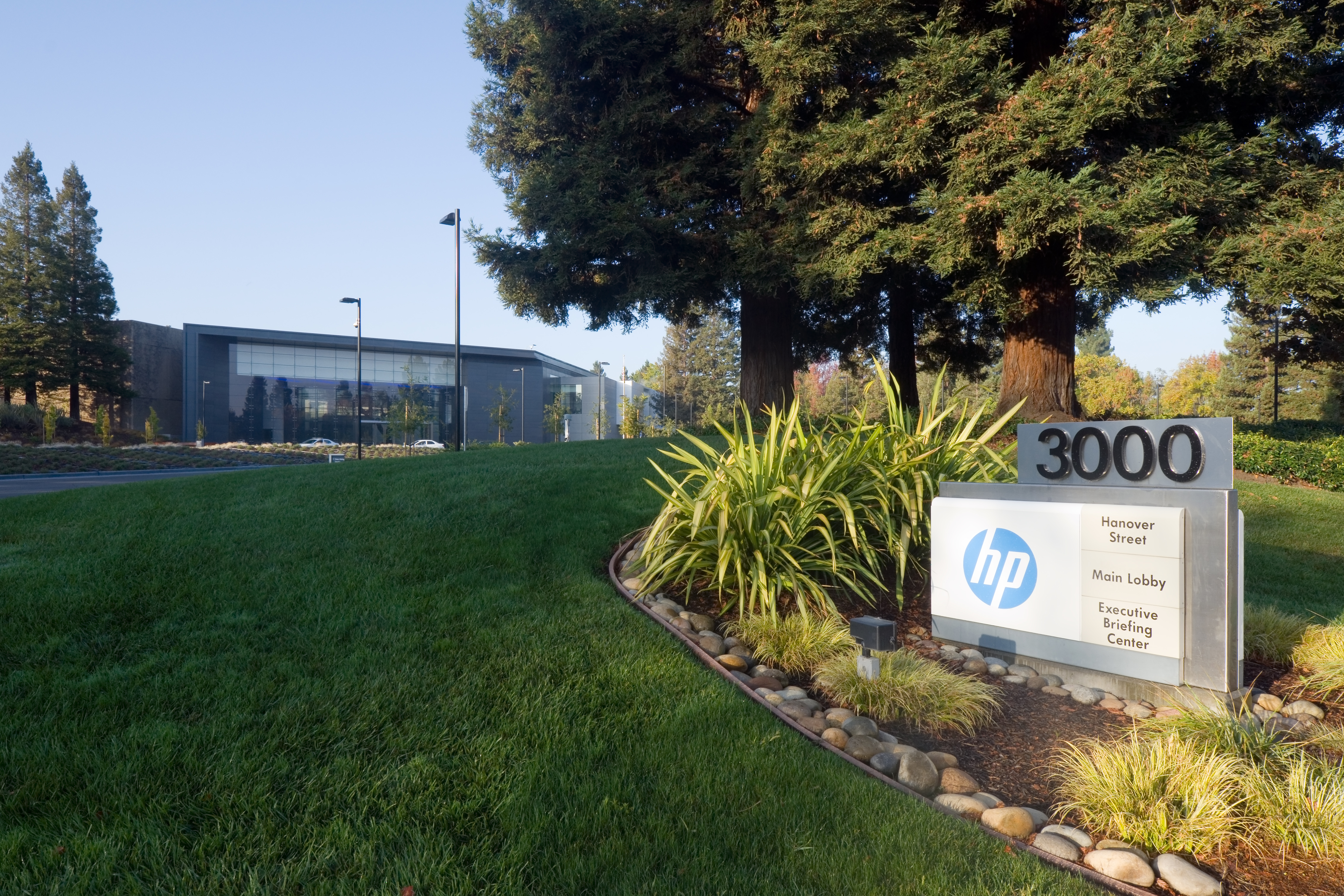
- Headquarters in Palo Alto, California
- Type: Public
- Traded as: NYSE: HPQ; S&P 500 component
- Industry: Information technology Computer hardware
- Predecessor: Hewlett-Packard
- Founded: November 1, 2015; 11 years ago
- Headquarters: Stanford Research Park, Palo Alto, California, U.S.
- Area served: Worldwide
- Key people: Chip Bergh (chairman); Bruce D. Broussard (Interim CEO)
- Products: Personal computers; Printers; 3D printers; Digital presses; Scanners; Copiers; Monitors and peripherals; Printing supplies
- Services: Managed print services; 3D printing services; Device as a service
- Revenue: ▲US$55.29 billion (2025)
- Operating income: ▼US$3.174 billion (2025)
- Net income: ▼US$2.529 billion (2025)
- Total assets: ▲US$41.77 billion (2025)
- Total equity: ▲US$−346 million (2025)
- Number of employees: c. 55,000 (2025)
- Divisions: HP Labs
- Subsidiaries: List of subsidiaries
- Website: hp.com
- Footnotes; Financials as of October 31, 2025.

HP Inc. is an American multinational information technology company with its headquarters in Palo Alto, California, that develops personal computers (PCs), printers and other related supplies, as well as 3D printing services. It is the world's second-largest personal computer vendor by unit sales after Lenovo and ahead of Dell as of 2024.

HP Inc. was founded in 2015 when the original Hewlett-Packard company split into two companies. The old company's enterprise product and business services divisions were spun off into a new publicly traded company, Hewlett Packard Enterprise, while Hewlett-Packard itself was renamed HP Inc. and retained the personal computer and printer services divisions of its predecessor, serving as the legal successor of the original company that was founded in 1939. HP is listed on the New York Stock Exchange and is a constituent of the S&P 500 Index. In the 2023 Fortune 500 list, HP is ranked 63rd-largest United States corporation by total revenue.

== History ==
=== As Hewlett-Packard ===
Hewlett-Packard was founded in 1939 by Bill Hewlett and David Packard, who both graduated with degrees in electrical engineering from Stanford University in 1935. The company started off in the HP Garage in Palo Alto, California.

In March 2015, HP announced that Bang & Olufsen would become the company's new premium audio partner for its computers and other devices. This replaced the partnership with Beats Electronics that ended upon being acquired by Apple Inc. in 2014.

On November 1, 2015, Hewlett-Packard was split into two companies. Its personal computer and printer businesses became HP Inc., while its enterprise business became Hewlett Packard Enterprise. The split was structured so that Hewlett-Packard changed its name to HP Inc. and spun off Hewlett Packard Enterprise as a new publicly traded company. HP Inc. retains Hewlett-Packard's pre-2015 stock price history and its former stock ticker symbol, HPQ, while Hewlett Packard Enterprise trades under its own symbol, HPE.

=== As HP Inc. ===
In May 2016, HP introduced a new PC gaming sub-brand known as Omen (reusing trademarks associated with VoodooPC), including gaming laptops and desktops (with the latter offering options such as CPU water cooling and Nvidia's GTX 1080 graphics, and promoted as VR-ready), and other accessories (such as monitors) designed to cater to the market. Between May and August of that year, certain assets were sold to OpenText, including TeamSite and Exstream.

In November 2017, HP acquired Samsung Electronics' printer division for $1.05 billion.

In February 2021, HP announced its acquisition of Kingston's gaming division HyperX for $425 million. The deal only includes computer peripherals branded as HyperX, not memory or storage. The sale was completed in June 2021.

In February 2022, HP announced it had acquired the Edinburgh-based packaging development company, Choose Packaging, in an effort to strengthen its capabilities in the sustainable packaging vertical.

In March 2022, HP announced the acquisition of the California-headquartered communications software and hardware provider Poly Inc. in an all-cash transaction. HP said the cash amount agreed was $40 per share, which implied a total enterprise value of $3.3bn, inclusive Poly's net debts.

In May 2024, HP announced its intentions on restructuring its lineup of consumer PCs in preparation for the next generation of computers with artificial intelligence, stating that most of its PC models (except Omen) would adopt a new branding nomenclature under the new Omni brand, which consisted of the OmniBook (a revival of an old brand that was defunct in 2002 after acquiring Compaq that year), OmniStudio and OmniDesk models. The Omni brand of computers features AI-powered hardware and software, coexisting with HP's other offerings as of 2025.

In February 2025, HP announced it would acquire key artificial intelligence assets from Humane for approximately $116 million, including its Cosmos AI platform, intellectual property with more than 300 patents and patent applications, and much of Humane's engineering team. As part of the deal, Humane discontinued its AI Pin wearable device. HP stated that the acquisition would accelerate development of AI-powered experiences across its PCs, printers, and collaboration products.

In March 2026, HP introduced HP IQ, an AI software platform designed to connect HP AI PCs, printers, meeting-room devices, and workplace hardware through local AI processing and proximity-based connectivity. The platform was announced during HP Imagine 2026 as part of the company's broader AI ecosystem strategy.

=== Attempted merger with Xerox ===
On November 5, 2019, The Wall Street Journal reported that print and digital document company Xerox was contemplating acquiring HP. The company unanimously rejected two unsolicited offers, including a cash-and-stock offer at $22 per-share. HP stated that there was "uncertainty regarding Xerox's ability to raise the cash portion of the proposed consideration" (especially given that Xerox is a smaller company in terms of market cap than HP), and noted the company's aggressiveness. On November 26, 2019, Xerox issued a public letter defending allegations by HP that its offer was "uncertain" and "highly conditional", and declared its intent to "engage directly with HP shareholders to solicit their support in urging the HP Board to do the right thing and pursue this compelling opportunity."

Xerox stated in January 2020 that it would propose the replacement of HP's board of directors during its next shareholder meeting in April 2020. In a statement to TechCrunch, HP disclosed a belief that Xerox's bid was being "driven by" activist shareholder Carl Icahn. Xerox raised its bid to $24 per-share in February 2020.

On February 21, 2020, HP instituted a shareholder rights plan to fend off Xerox's pursuit of a hostile takeover. Four days later, HP announced that, if shareholders rejected the Xerox purchase, it planned on offering $16 billion in capital return between fiscal 2020 and 2022, including $8 billion in additional share buybacks and raising its "target long-term return of capital to 100% of free cash flow generation". HP criticized Xerox's bid as a "flawed value exchange" based on "overstated synergies". On March 5, 2020, HP rejected an offer at $24 per-share.

On March 31, 2020, Xerox rescinded its bid to buy HP Inc, citing that "the current global health crisis and resulting macroeconomic and market turmoil" had "created an environment that is not conducive to Xerox continuing to pursue an acquisition of HP Inc."

== Products and operations ==
HP develops personal computers (PCs; both consumer and business laptops and desktops), printers, scanners, monitors, accessories, workstations, servers, and related software and services such as 3D printing.

Its consumer PCs as of 2026 include the Essential line and Omen (gaming), as well as AI-powered PCs marketed under the Omni brand such as the OmniBook, OmniDesk and OmniStudio. HP's business computers are marketed under the "Pro" and "Elite" prefixes. In the professional space, HP market the HP Z series of desktop workstations and its mobile equivalent, HP ZBook.

It also manufactures the DeskJet, OfficeJet, LaserJet, and Envy series of printers and the ScanJet line of image scanners.

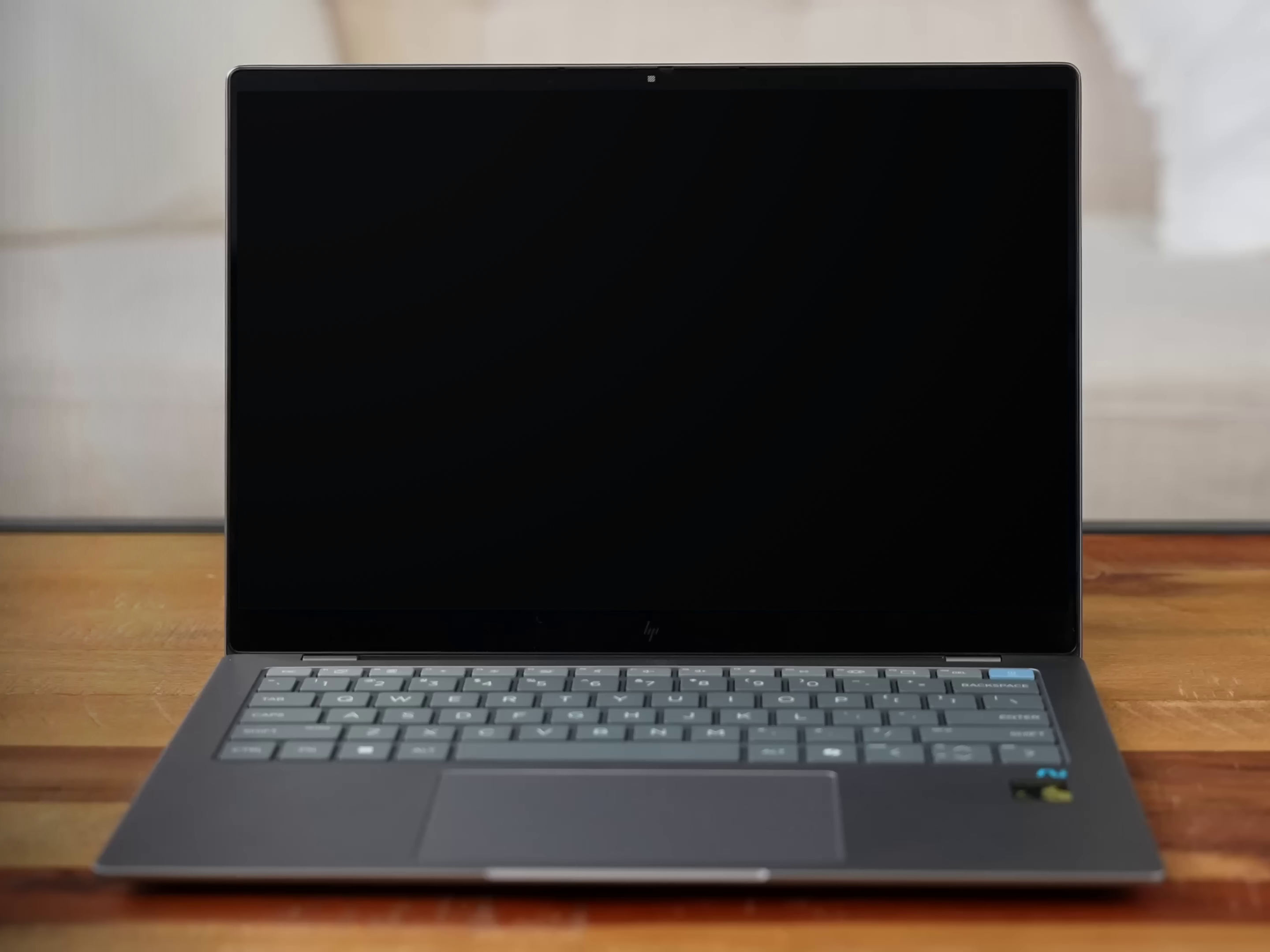
HP OmniBook X AI laptop (2024)

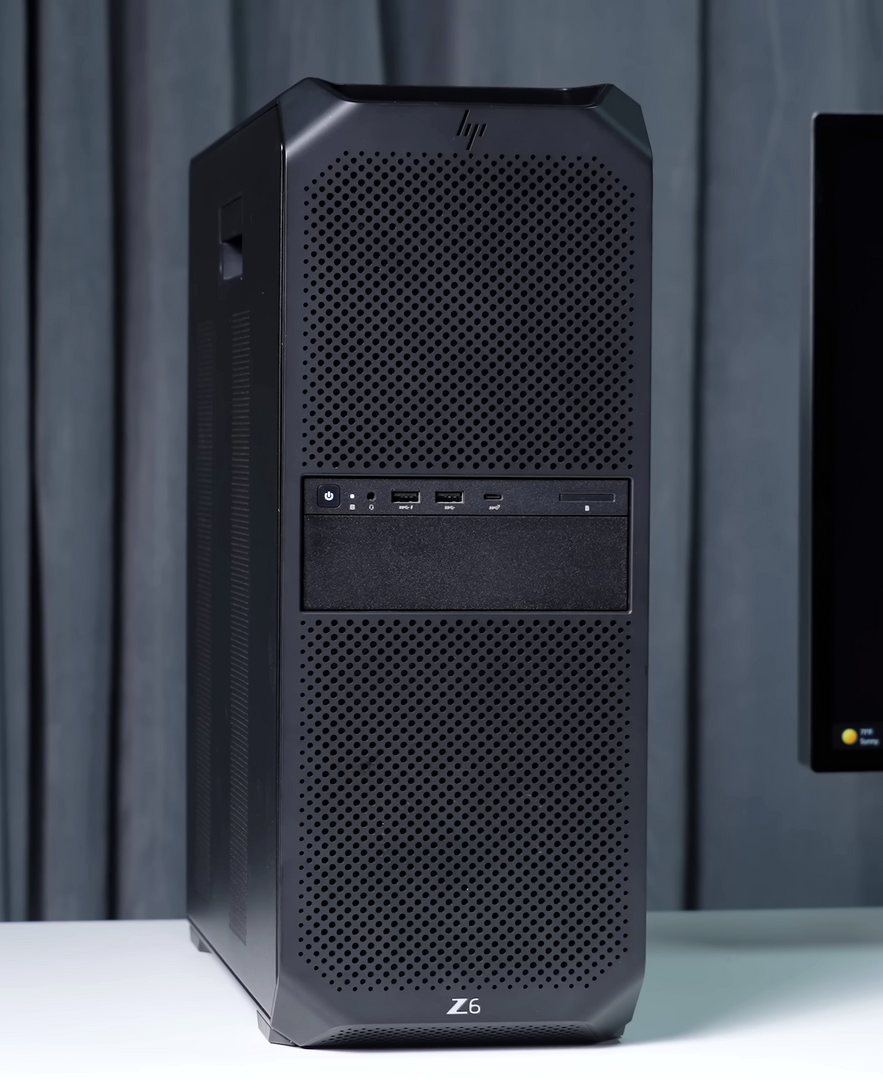
HP Z6 high-end workstation (2023)

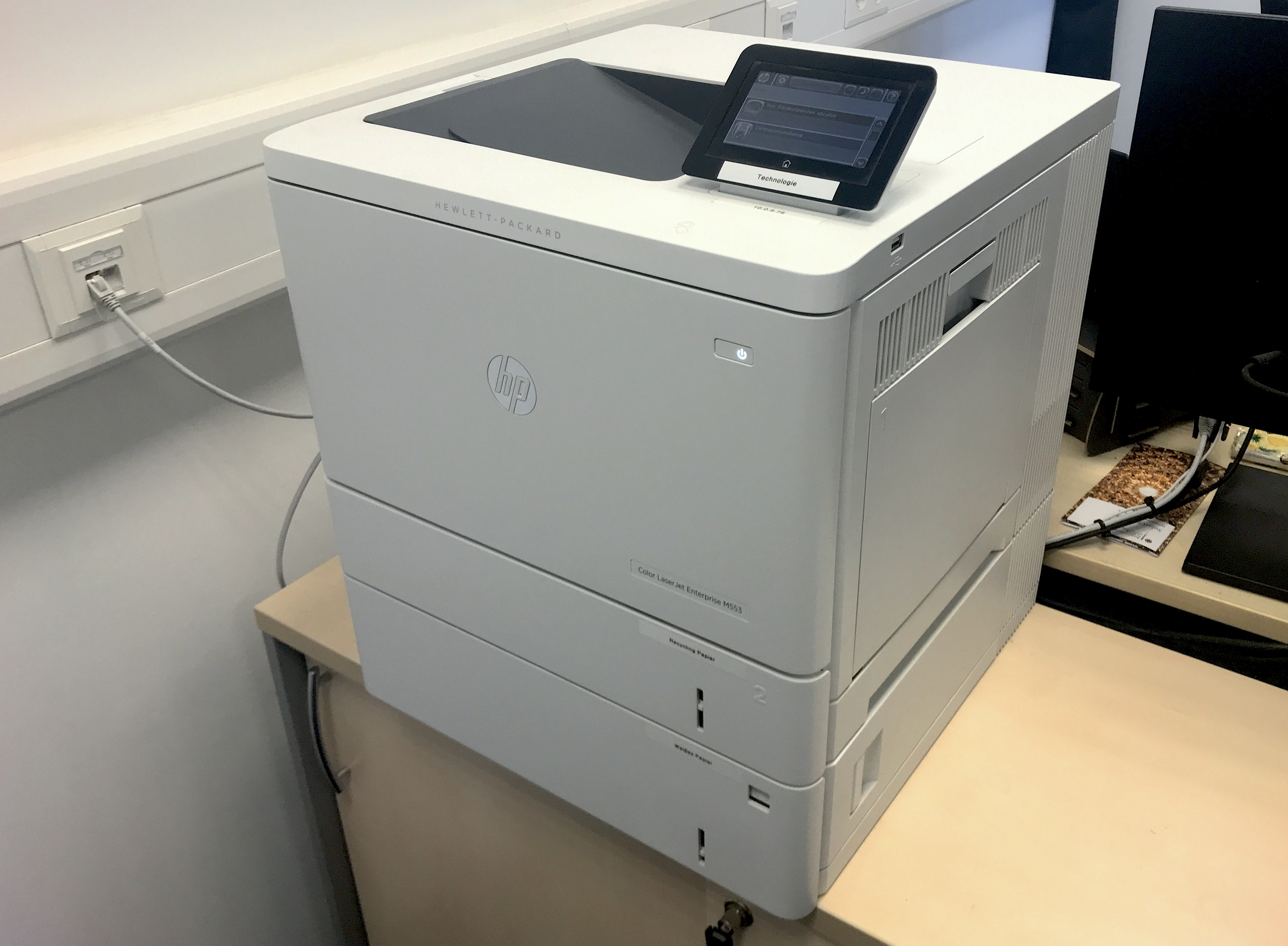
HP LaserJet Enterprise color printer

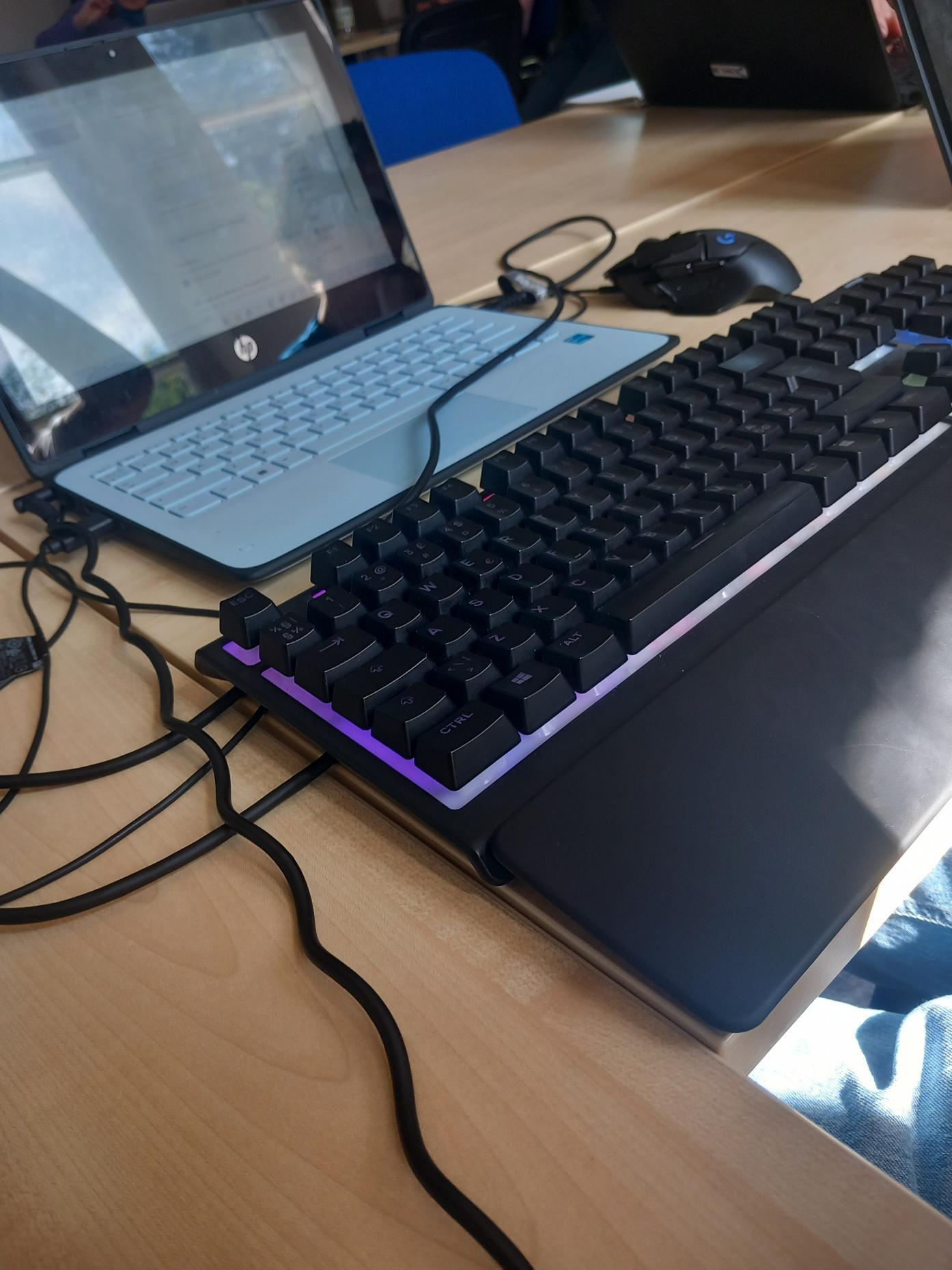
A HP laptop connected to a keyboard

=== Subsidiaries and acquisitions ===
HP Inc. has several HP corporate subsidiaries and holding companies, as well several that were acquired as part of acquisitions. HP Inc. and Hewlett Packard Enterprise have both continued to acquire companies after being split in 2015.

== Corporate affairs ==
In fiscal year 2023, total revenue of US$54 billion included US$24.7 billion from the sale of notebook computers, US$10.9 billion from the sale of desktop computers, US$11.4 billion from the sale of printer supplies, US$4.2 billion from the sale of commercial printers, and US$2.4 billion from the sale of consumer printers. Over 65 percent of revenue in 2022 came from customers outside of the United States.

HP's first quarter fiscal 2024 net revenue was $13.2 billion, representing a 4.4% decrease (4.9% in constant currency) year-over-year. HP's strong operating activities in the first quarter of fiscal 2024 generated $121 million in net cash. The company also reported a positive free cash flow of $25 million for the quarter. Free cash flow includes $121 million in net cash from operating activities, with adjustments of $62 million for net lease investments and $158 million for property, plant, and equipment investments.

The key trends for HP Inc. are (as of the financial year ending October 31):

FY	Revenue (US$ bn)	Net profit (US$ bn)	Employees
2015	50.4	3.7	?
2016	48.2	2.6	49,000
2017	52.2	2.5	49,000
2018	58.1	5.3	55,000
2019	58.3	3.1	56,000
2020	56.5	2.8	53,000
2021	63.2	6.5	51,000
2022	62.0	3.1	58,000
2023	53.4	3.2	58,000
2024	53.6	2.8	58,000

=== Sports sponsorships ===
==== Formula 1 ====
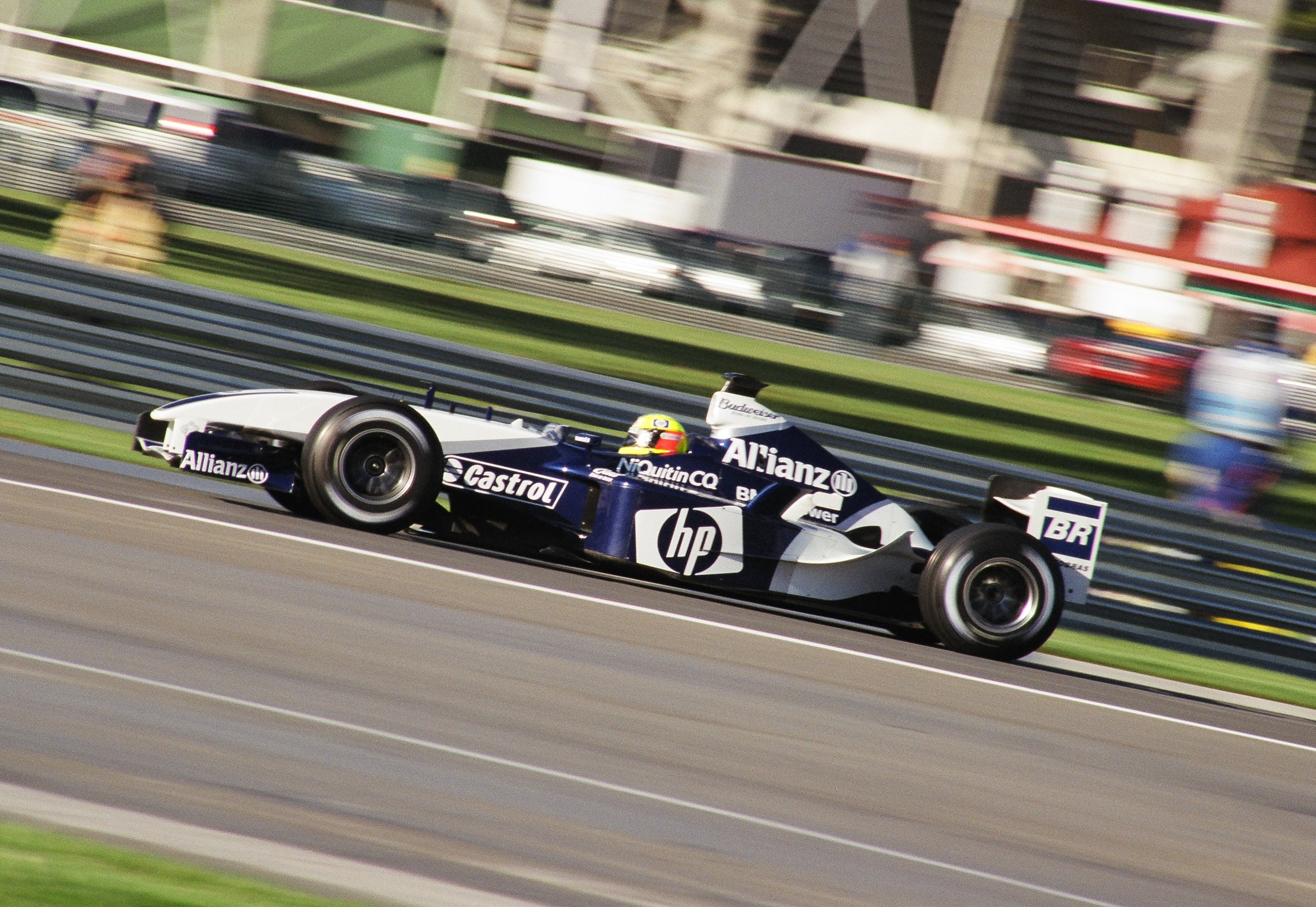
HP sponsorship on the Williams FW25, 2003

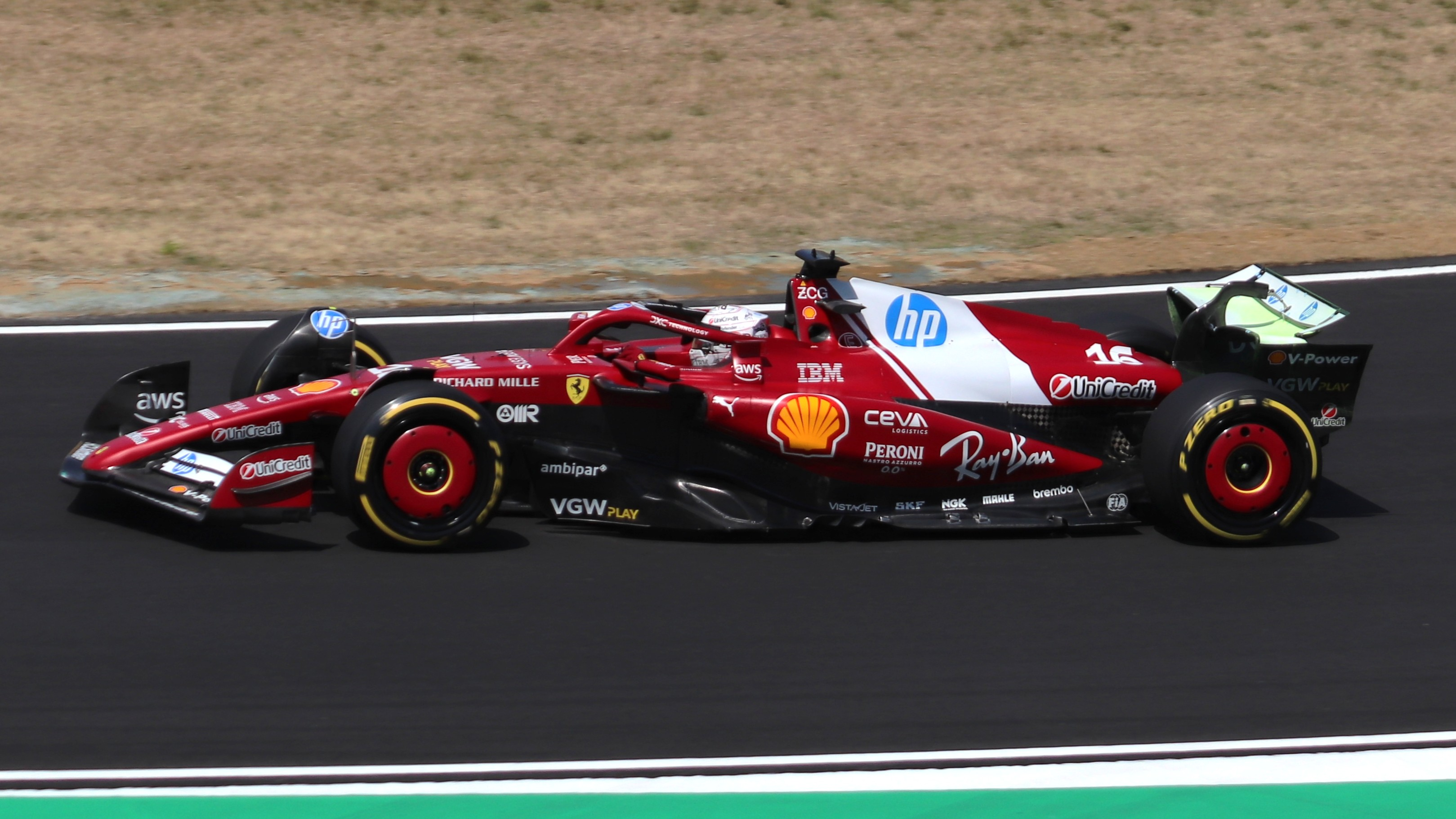
HP sponsorship on the Scuderia Ferrari SF-25, 2025

HP has had a long history with Formula 1 sponsorship beginning in 1988 with a single season sponsorship with Larrousse Throughout the 1990s and 2000s, HP served as a minor sponsor and technology supplier for many teams, including Forti (1996), Jordan (1996-2002), Benetton (1997-1999), Minardi (1997), Stewart (1998-1999), Jaguar (2000-2003) and Renault (2010).

From 2002 to 2005, HP served as title sponsor of Williams Racing (then known as BMW WilliamsF1 at the time) after acquiring Compaq in 2002; Compaq previously served as title sponsor of the team from 2000 to 2001. HP concluded the sponsorship deal with Williams Racing in 2005.

In April 2024, HP announced that it has signed a multi-year deal to become the title sponsor for the Ferrari team, extending to the team's F1 Academy and esports programs.

==== Association Football ====
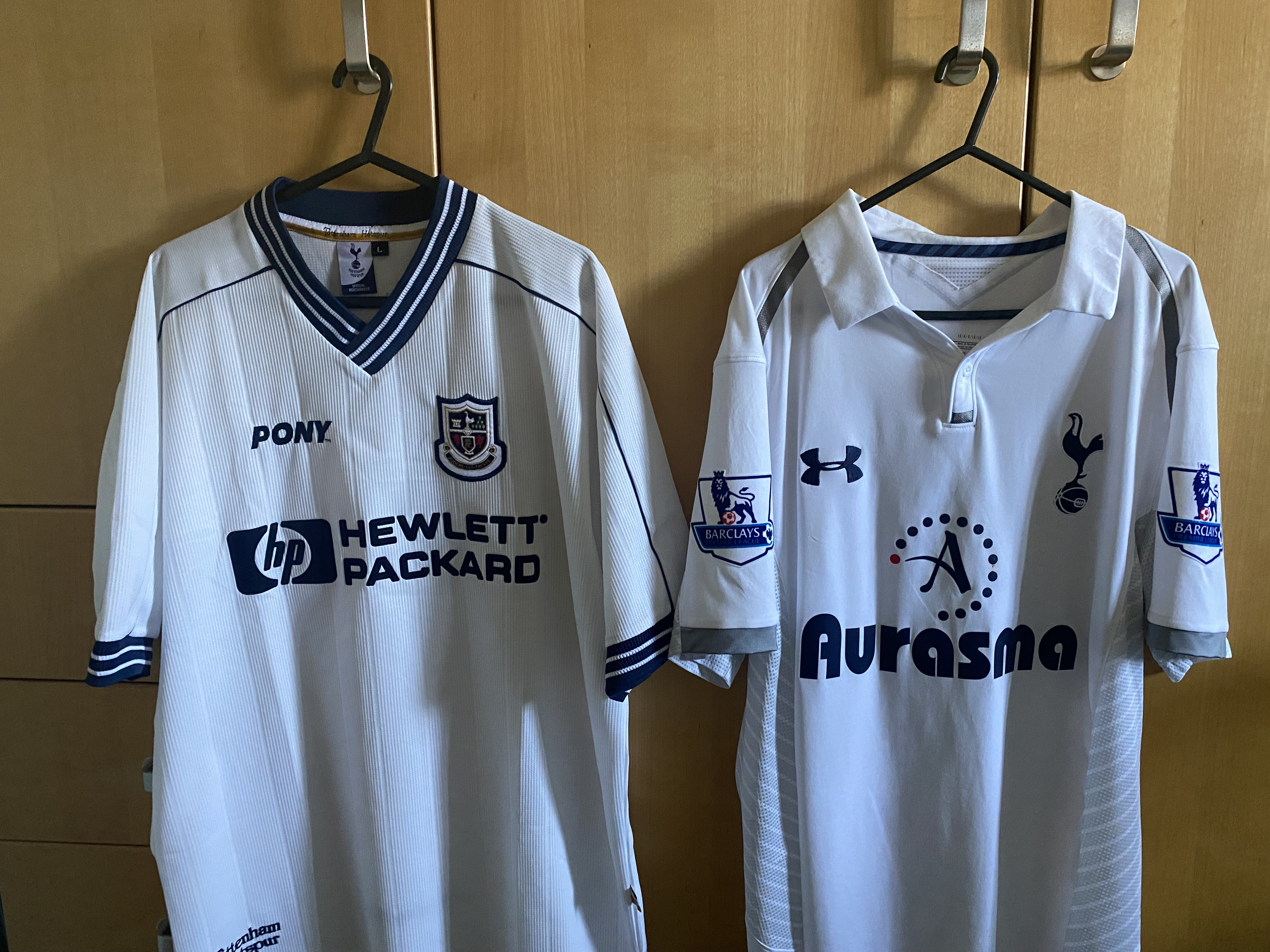
HP and Aurasma sponsorship on Tottenham Hotspur's 1997-99 and 2012-13 home kits

HP was the shirt sponsor for the English Premier League football club Tottenham Hotspur from 1995 to 1999, preceding and succeeding the German lager Holsten. Enterprise software company Autonomy became Tottenham's shirt sponsor beginning in the 2010-11 season for domestic matches and were acquired by HP in 2011. HP continued with the deal, changing the sponsorship in the 2011-12 season to feature Autonomy's augmented reality platform Aurasma, before replacing the previous Autonomy branding with HP branding for the final year of the sponsorship in the 2013-2014 season.

In July 2023, HP signed a sponsorship agreement with Welsh club Wrexham, becoming the club's sleeve sponsor.

In February 2024, HP signed a 3-year sleeve sponsorship deal with Real Madrid, becoming the first sleeve sponsor in the club's 121-year history.

=== Sustainability ===
HP reported total CO_{2}e emissions for the twelve months ending October 31, 2023, at 19,764,400 tonnes CO_{2}-equivalent and planned to reduce emissions 60% by 2025 from a 2015 base year. According to a press release issued on April 20, 2021, HP seeks to achieve net zero greenhouse gas emissions by 2040.

Steps it has taken to achieve this include reducing product materials and moving to recycled materials, providing certified refurbished systems and reducing single use plastics in packaging. HP have worked with a charity, First Mile, in Haiti, on a recycling facility so it can process and reuse plastics in its products. They had retrieved over 110 million ocean bound plastic bottles as of the 16th March 2024.

HP is committed to circularity, aiming to source 75% of its products and packaging from circular sources by 2030. EcoVardis scored HP at 90 in 2025, an increase from 83 in 2024, receiving a platinum award for the 15th year in a row. The demand for new laptop computers caused by the growth in home working during the global COVID-19 pandemic led HP to engage with a remanufacturing supplier to develop and sell refurbished devices. HP have collaborated with Oxford Economics to survey business executives and government officials and found that technology is important to advance sustainability and contributes positively to business outcomes.

=== Lobbying and political influence ===
In 2025, HP was one of the donors who funded the White House's East Wing demolition and planned building of a ballroom.

== Controversies ==
=== Blocking third-party ink cartridges ===
In 2016, HP introduced firmware in its printers that disabled the printers if users used ink or toner cartridges which did not contain "new or reused HP chips or electronic circuitry." As a result, HP faced scathing criticism (such as that from the Electronic Frontier Foundation) and paid millions in class-action lawsuits, such as to certain customers in the US ($1.5 million), Canada ($700,000 CAD), Australia, and Europe ($1.350 million), but without admitting wrongdoing. HP's stated that the firmware was intended to provide "the best consumer experience" and "protect" customers from "counterfeit and third-party ink cartridges that do not contain an original HP security chip and that infringe on our IP."

In 2023, PC World reported that HP printers still prevent users from using third-party ink.

=== Disabling all-in-one printers ===
In 2023, HP was sued over allegations that it intentionally designed its all-in-one printers not to perform scanning or faxing when they were low on ink.

=== Disabling ink cartridges ===
In February 2019, How-To Geek published an article reporting that HP remotely disabled ink cartridges when the user cancels their Instant Ink subscription.

According to the HP Instant Ink terms of service, the subscription cartridges are remotely disabled by HP when the service is cancelled, and the user is then required to purchase standard cartridges to continue printing. The company has also used a firmware feature called "Dynamic Security" to block third-party ink cartridges that do not have an HP chip.

=== Xinjiang region ===
In 2020, the Australian Strategic Policy Institute accused at least 82 major brands, including HP Inc, of being potentially connected to forced Uyghur labor in the Chinese Xinjiang province.

In 2022, in response to the U.S. Uyghur Forced Labor Prevention Act, HP responded, "HP is committed to respecting human rights across our global supply chain and we prohibit the use of involuntary labor of any kind. HP also commits to respecting fundamental rights and freedoms defined in the United Nations (UN) Universal Declaration of Human Rights (UDHR) in an approach consistent with the UN Guiding Principles on Business and Human Rights (UNGPs) as outlined in our Human Rights Policy."

=== Israeli conflicts ===
In 2023, during the ongoing Gaza war, HP as well as Hewlett Packard Enterprise (HPE) was criticised for Hewlett-Packard Israel's products being provided to the Israeli Police, Israeli Prison Service, and Israeli Population and Immigration Authority. The BDS movement has called for consumers and organizations to boycott all HPE IT services and products as well as printers, computers, and printer cartridges from HP Inc. HP have responded to these allegations, via a statement that included "The misinformation about HP Inc. being circulated by some on social media is unfortunate and untrue. As a matter of policy, we do not take sides in political disputes between countries or regions".

=== Obsolescence practices ===
In 2024, A French association called Halte à l'Obsolescence Programmée (HOP) filed a complaint against the printer manufacturer HP, accusing it of planned obsolescence practices. The complaint alleges that HP artificially blocks printers when it detects a cartridge as empty, even if there is ink remaining. HOP argued these practices force consumers to purchase new cartridges unnecessarily, contributing to waste and environmental harm.

=== Buggy drivers ===
In February 2025, HP started pushing out buggy BIOS through Windows Update, which affected some models of ProBooks and EliteBooks. HP replied that it is investigating problems.

=== 6,000 job cuts by 2028 ===
HP CEO Enrique Lores said in a press conference that the company plans to cut between 4,000 and 6,000 jobs over the next three years as it uses artificial intelligence tools across its business to cut costs, save about $1 billion and accelerate product innovation. He said the cuts would mainly affect product development, internal operations and customer support. HP laid off between 1,000 and 2,000 employees in February as part of the same plan.

== Logo history ==
=== Hewlett-Packard era (1939–2015) ===
1939–1954

1954–1964

1964–1979

1979–2010 (corporate)

1979-2010 (primary)

2007–2008 (secondary), 2008–2012 (3D variant)

2008–2012 (secondary)

2010–2012 (primary), 2012–2014 (secondary)

2010–2015 (corporate)

2012–2015

=== HP Inc. era (2015–present) ===
2015–present (corporate)

2015–2025

2025–present

2016–present (alternative logo used on some computers)

== See also ==
- Hewlett Packard Enterprise – the demerged sibling company that offers servers, storage, networking and communications.
- HP Labs
- List of largest technology companies by revenue
