= List of assets owned by HP =

This is a list of assets owned by HP Inc., an American multinational information technology company. The company has subsidiaries based in countries across the world, with several of them being associated with previous acquisitions by the company.

== Through acquisitions ==
The following subsidiaries of HP are associated with acquisitions by the company:

Acquisition	Country	Company	Notes
Apogee	France	Apogee France Holdings SAS	
Apogee	France	Apogee France SAS	
Apogee	France	Apogee International	
Apogee	Germany	Apogee Deutschland GmbH	
Apogee	Germany	Apogee Germany Holding UG	
Apogee	Ireland	Apogee Corporation (Ireland) Limited	
Apogee	Isle of Man	Argon Business Systems Limited	
Apogee	Isle of Man	Argon Office Systems Limited	
Apogee	Jersey	Albacore Holdings Jersey Ltd	Created to acquire Apogee
Apogee	Jersey	Apogee Corporation (Jersey) Limited	
Apogee	Jersey	Manzana Holdings Limited	Holding company for Apogee
Apogee	United Kingdom	Apogee Corporation Limited	
Apogee	United Kingdom	Apogee Europe Limited	
Apogee	United Kingdom	Apogee Group Limited	
Apogee	United Kingdom	Apogee Managed Services International Limited	
Apogee	United Kingdom	Apogee Rentals Limited	
Apogee	United Kingdom	Balreed Digitec (Group) Limited	Acquired by Apogee in 2015
Apogee	United Kingdom	Balreed Digitec (North) Limited	Acquired by Apogee in 2015
Apogee	United Kingdom	Balreed Digitec (SE) Limited	Acquired by Apogee in 2015
Apogee	United Kingdom	Balreed Digitec (UK) Limited	Acquired by Apogee in 2015
Apogee	United Kingdom	City Docs Limited	Acquired by Apogee in 2017
Apogee	United Kingdom	City Docs Solutions Limited	Acquired by Apogee in 2017
Apogee	United Kingdom	Datatron Document Image Archiving Limited	Acquired by Apogee in 2023
Apogee	United Kingdom	Direct-Tec Group Limited	Acquired by Apogee in 2021
Apogee	United Kingdom	Direct-Tec UK Limited	Acquired by Apogee in 2021
Apogee	United Kingdom	F. Smith & Co (Office Equipment) Limited	Acquired by Apogee in 2016
Apogee	United Kingdom	Manzana Bidco Limited	
Apogee	United Kingdom	Office Perfection Limited	Acquired by Apogee in 2016
Apogee	United Kingdom	Perigee Holdco UK Limited	Holding companies for Apogee
Apogee	United Kingdom	Perigee Midco UK Limited	Holding companies for Apogee
Apogee	United Kingdom	The Danwood Group Limited	Acquired by Apogee in 2017
Apogee	United Kingdom	Xact Document Solutions Limited	Acquired by Apogee in 2016
Apogee	United Kingdom	Xera-Logic Group Limited	Acquired by Apogee in 2016
Choose Packaging	United Kingdom	Choose Water Limited	
CM Advanced Printing (via Apogee)	Portugal	CM Advanced Printing Iberia Portuguese Branch Office	50% owned
CM Advanced Printing (via Apogee)	Spain	Burokopy, S.L.	50% owned
CM Advanced Printing (via Apogee)	Spain	CM Advanced Printing Iberia, S.A.	50% owned, renamed CM Apogee
CM Advanced Printing (via Apogee)	Spain	Soluciones Integrales De Impresión S.L.	50% owned
CM Advanced Printing (via Apogee)	Spain	Tot Servei Ofitmatica I Manteniment, S.L.U.	50% owned
Compaq	Cayman Islands	Compaq Cayman Holdings Company	
Compaq	Cayman Islands	Compaq Cayman Holdings General Partnership II	
Compaq	United States	Compaq Information Technologies, LLC	
CyberCore	United States	CyberCore Technologies, LLC	
Indigo	Israel	HP Indigo Ltd	Renamed HP Indigo Division
Indigo	Netherlands	HP Indigo B.V.	
Indigo	United States	Indigo America, Inc.	
PictureTel (via Poly)	United States	PictureTel LLC	
Plantronics (via Poly)	Canada	Plantronics Canada Inc.	
Plantronics (via Poly)	Canada	Plantronics B.V. (Canada Branch)	
Plantronics (via Poly)	Cayman Islands	Plantronics International Ltd.	
Plantronics (via Poly)	Chile	Comercializadora Plantronics Chile Limitada	
Plantronics (via Poly)	China	Plantronics Trading (Suzhou) Co., Ltd	
Plantronics (via Poly)	Colombia	Plantronics BV Sucursal Colombia	
Plantronics (via Poly)	France	Plantronics B.V., Succursale Francaise	
Plantronics (via Poly)	Germany	Plantronics Services GmbH	
Plantronics (via Poly)	Indonesia	Plantronics BV - Indonesia Rep Office	
Plantronics (via Poly)	Ireland	Poly Communications International Unlimited Company	
Plantronics (via Poly)	Malta	Plantronics Europe Limited	
Plantronics (via Poly)	Mexico	Plamex, S.A. de C.V.	
Plantronics (via Poly)	Netherlands	Plantronics B.V.	
Plantronics (via Poly)	Philippines	Plantronics BV - Philippines Rep Office	
Plantronics (via Poly)	Sweden	Plantronics Sweden, filial of Plantronics B.V., the Netherlands	
Plantronics (via Poly)	United Kingdom	Plantronics Limited	
Plantronics (via Poly)	United States	Plantronics, Inc.	
Polycom (via Poly)	Argentina	Polycom Telecomunicacoes do Brasil Ltda. - Argentina Branch	
Polycom (via Poly)	Australia	Polycom Australia Pty Ltd	
Polycom (via Poly)	Brazil	Polycom Telecomunicacoes do Brasil Ltda.	
Polycom (via Poly)	Chile	Comercializadora Plantronics Chile Limitada	
Polycom (via Poly)	China	Polycom Communication Solutions (Beijing) Co. Ltd.	
Polycom (via Poly)	China	Polycom Communications Technology (Beijing) Co. Ltd.	
Polycom (via Poly)	Denmark	Polycom (Copenhagen) Aps	
Polycom (via Poly)	France	Polycom (France), S.A.R.L.	
Polycom (via Poly)	Hong Kong	Polycom Hong Kong Limited	
Polycom (via Poly)	India	Polycom Technology (R&D) Center Private Ltd	
Polycom (via Poly)	Israel	Polycom Israel Ltd	
Polycom (via Poly)	Italy	Polycom (Italy) S.r.l	
Polycom (via Poly)	Japan	Polycom Japan K.K.	
Polycom (via Poly)	Malaysia	Polycom Asia Pacific Pte. Ltd - Malaysia Branch	
Polycom (via Poly)	Mexico	Poly-com, S de RL de CV	
Polycom (via Poly)	Saudi Arabia	Polycom Saudi Limited	
Polycom (via Poly)	Singapore	Polycom Asia Pacific Pte. Ltd.	
Polycom (via Poly)	Singapore	Polycom Global (Singapore) Pte. Ltd.	
Polycom (via Poly)	Spain	Polycom Solutions (Spain) SL	
Polycom (via Poly)	Taiwan	Polycom Asia Pacific Pte. Ltd, Taiwan Branch	
Polycom (via Poly)	Thailand	Polycom Global Limited	
Polycom (via Poly)	Tunisia	Polycom Unified Iletisim Sanayi ve Ticaret Limited Sirketi	
Polycom (via Poly)	United Arab Emirates	Polycom (Mena) FZ-LLC	
Polycom (via Poly)	United States	Polycom International Corporation	
Polycom (via Poly)	United States	Polycom, LLC	
Scailex Corporation	Israel	HP Scitex Ltd	
Simpress	Brazil	Simpress Comércio, Locação e Serviços Ltda	
TOWER Software	Australia	Tower Software Engineering Pty Ltd	
Vyopta	United States	Vyopta Incorporated	

== Corporate subsidiaries ==
The following subsidiaries of HP are not associated with a previous acquisition by the company:

Country	Company	Notes
Argentina	HP Inc Argentina S.R.L.	
Australia	HP PPS Australia Pty Ltd	
Austria	HP Austria GmbH	
Belgium	HP Belgium BV	
Bermuda	HP Onyx Holding L.P.	
Brazil	HP Brasil Indústria e Comércio de Equipamentos Eletrônicos Ltda (Note: HP also holds the following branches: HP Brasil Indústria e Comércio de Equipamentos Eletrônicos Ltda. - Branch 01 (Tamboré); HP Brasil Indústria e Comércio de Equipamentos Eletrônicos Ltda. - Branch 2 (Sorocaba); HP Brasil Indústria e Comércio de Equipamentos Eletrônicos Ltda. - Branch 3 (Porto Alegre); HP Brasil Indústria e Comércio de Equipamentos Eletrônicos Ltda. - Branch 4 (Itapoá))	
British Virgin Islands	AOME Holdings Ltd.	
Bulgaria	HP Inc Bulgaria EOOD	
Canada	HP Canada Licensing L.P.	
Canada	HP Canada Co. HP Canada Cie	
Canada	HP Canada Development Co.	
Cayman Islands	Hewlett-Packard West Indies Limited	
Chile	HP Inc Chile Comercial Limitada	
China	China HP Co., Ltd. (Note: HP also holds the following branches: China HP Co., Ltd. Chengdu Branch; China HP Co., Ltd. Guangzhou Branch; China HP Co., Ltd. Nanjing Branch; China HP Co., Ltd. Shanghai Branch; China HP Co., Ltd Suzhou Branch; China HP Co., Ltd., Jiangan Branch; China HP Co., Ltd Jinan Branch; China HP Co., Ltd Shenyang Branch; China HP Co., Ltd Shenzhen Branch; China HP Co., Ltd Xian Branch)	
China	HP (Chongqing) Co., Ltd	
China	HP (Chongqing) Manufacturing, Export, Procurement and Settlement Co., Ltd	
China	HP Information Technology R&D (Shanghai) Co., Ltd (Note: HP also holds the following branches: HP Information Technology R&D (Shanghai) Co., Ltd Beijing Branch; HP Information Technology R&D (Shanghai) Co., Ltd. Suzhou Branch)	
China	HP Supply Chain Management (Shandong) Co., Ltd.	
China	HP Trading (Shanghai) Co. Ltd. (Note: HP also holds the following branches: HP Trading (Shanghai) Co., Ltd. Dalian Branch; HP Trading (Shanghai) Co., Ltd. Zhangjiang Branch)	
China	HP Trading Kunshan Co., Ltd.	
China	Shanghai Peridot Printing Co. Ltd.	
Colombia	HP Colombia SAS	
Costa Rica	HP Inc. Costa Rica Limitada	
Costa Rica	HP PPS Costa Rica Limitada	
Croatia	HP Computing and Printing d.o.o. za računalne i srodne aktivnosti	
Czech Republic	HP Inc Czech Republic s.r.o.	
Denmark	HP Inc Danmark ApS	
Finland	HP Finland Oy	
France	HP France Holding SAS	
France	HP France SAS	
Germany	HP Deutschland GmbH	
Germany	HP Health Solutions Germany GmbH	
Greece	HP Printing and Personal Systems Hellas EPE (Note: Greek: HP Συστήματα Εκτύπωσης και Προσωπικών Υπολογιστών Ελλάς ΕΠΕ)	
Hong Kong	HP Inc AP Hong Kong Limited	
Hong Kong	HP Inc Hong Kong Limited	
Hungary	HP Inc Magyarország Kft.	
India	HP Computing and Printing Systems India Private Limited	
India	HP India Sales Private Limited	
India	HP PPS India Operations Private Limited	
India	HP PPS Services India Private Limited	
Indonesia	PT Hewlett-Packard Indonesia	
Ireland	Hewlett-Packard Ireland (Holdings) Ltd.	
Ireland	Hewlett-Packard Ireland 1, Limited	
Ireland	HP Production Company Limited	
Ireland	HP Technology Ireland Limited	
Israel	HP Israel Ltd	
Israel	HP Technology Israel Ltd	
Italy	HP Italy S.r.l.	
Japan	Hewlett-Packard G.K.	
Japan	HP Japan Holdings Nin-I Kumiai	
Japan	HP Japan Inc.	
Japan	Nihon HP Nin-I Kumiai	
Kazakhstan	HP Global Trading B.V., Kazakhstan Branch	
Korea	HP Korea Inc.	
Korea	HP Printing Korea Co., Ltd.	
Luxembourg	HP Luxembourg S.C.A.	
Malaysia	HP Malaysia Manufacturing Sdn. Bhd.	
Malaysia	HP PPS Malaysia Sdn. Bhd.	
Malaysia	HP PPS Sales Sdn. Bhd.	
Mexico	Computing and Printing Global Services Mexico, S. de R.L. de C.V.	
Mexico	Computing and Printing Mexico, S. de R.L. de C.V.	
Morocco	HP PPS Maroc	
Netherlands	Alpha Holding One B.V.	
Netherlands	Alpha Holding Two B.V.	
Netherlands	Anatolus Holding B.V.	
Netherlands	Arnon Holding B.V.	
Netherlands	Bamberga Holding B.V.	
Netherlands	Eunomia Holding B.V.	
Netherlands	Flame Holding B.V.	
Netherlands	Hewlett-Packard (Japan NK) Holdings C.V.	
Netherlands	Hewlett-Packard Copenhagen B.V.	
Netherlands	Hewlett-Packard Global Holdings B.V.	
Netherlands	Hewlett-Packard Global Investments B.V.	
Netherlands	Hewlett-Packard Japan Holding B.V.	
Netherlands	Hewlett-Packard Sunnyvale B.V.	
Netherlands	HP China Holding B.V.	
Netherlands	HP Europe B.V.	
Netherlands	HP Global Trading B.V.	
Netherlands	HP Health Holding B.V.	
Netherlands	HP International Trading B.V.	
Netherlands	HP Nederland B.V.	
Netherlands	Kale Holding B.V.	
Netherlands	Lyra Holding B.V.	
Netherlands	Perseus Holding B.V.	
Netherlands	Regor Holding B.V.	
New Zealand	HP New Zealand	
Nigeria	HP Computing and Printing Nigeria Ltd	
Norway	HP Norge AS	
Pakistan	HP Pakistan (Private) Limited	
Panama	HP Panama Sales and Distribution, S. de R.L.	
Peru	HP Inc Peru S.R.L.	
Philippines	HP PPS Philippines Inc.	
Poland	HP Inc Polska sp. z o.o.	
Portugal	HPCP – Computing and Printing Portugal, Unipessoal, Lda.	
Puerto Rico	HP International Trading B.V. (Puerto Rico Branch), LLC	
Puerto Rico	HP Puerto Rico LLC	
Puerto Rico	Kale Holding B.V. (Puerto Rico Branch) LLC	
Qatar	Hewlett-Packard KSA Ltd., Qatar Branch	
Romania	HP Inc Romania SRL	
Russian Federation	Limited Liability Company HP Inc	
Saudi Arabia	HP KSA Ltd.	
Saudi Arabia	HP Middle East and North Africa Regional Headquarters (Single Shareholder LLC)	
Serbia	HP Computing and Printing d.o.o. (Beograd)	
Singapore	HP International Pte. Ltd.	
Singapore	HP PPS Asia Pacific Pte. Ltd.	
Singapore	HP PPS Singapore (Sales) Pte. Ltd.	
Singapore	HP R&D Singapore Pte. Ltd.	
Singapore	HP Singapore (Private) Limited	
Singapore	HP Singapore Services Pte. Ltd.	
Singapore	Peridot Print Singapore Pte. Ltd.	
Slovakia	HP Inc Slovakia, s.r.o.	
South Africa	HP South Africa Proprietary Limited	
South Africa	HP South Africa Trust	
Spain	HP Printing and Computing Solutions, S.L.U.	
Spain	HP Solutions Creation and Development Services S.L.U.	
Spain	Peridot Print Spain S.L.U.	
Sweden	HP PPS Sverige AB	
Switzerland	HP Europe BV, Amsterdam, Meyrin Branch	
Switzerland	HP International Sàrl	
Switzerland	HP Schweiz GmbH	
Switzerland	HP Suisse Services Sarl	
Switzerland	Peridot Print Switzerland SARL	
Taiwan	HP International Pte. Ltd. Hsinchu Branch	
Taiwan	HP International Pte. Ltd., Taiwan Branch	
Taiwan	HP Taiwan Information Technology Ltd.	
Thailand	HP Inc (Thailand) Ltd.	
Tunisia	HP Inc Tunisie SARL	
Tunisia	HP Bilgisayar ve Baskı Teknolojileri Limited Şirketi	
United Arab Emirates	HP Computing and Printing Middle East FZ-LLC	
United Arab Emirates	HP Europe B.V. - Abu Dhabi Branch	
United Arab Emirates	HP Europe B.V. Regional Dubai Branch	
United Arab Emirates	HP Inc Gulf	
United Kingdom	HP Inc UK Limited	
United Kingdom	HP UK Development Limited	
United States	Hewlett-Packard Company Archives LLC	Jointly owned with Hewlett Packard Enterprise (50% owned)
United States	Hewlett-Packard Enterprises, LLC	
United States	Hewlett-Packard World Trade, LLC	
United States	HP Health Solutions Inc.	
United States	HP Hewlett Packard Group LLC	Owns HP trademarks Jointly owned with Hewlett Packard Enterprise (50% owned)
United States	HP Jade Holding LLC	
United States	HP Licensing Holding LLC	
United States	HP R&D Holding LLC	
United States	HP Technology Holdings LLC	
United States	HP US Digital LLC	
United States	HP USA Manufacturing LLC	
United States	HPI Bermuda Holdings LLC	
United States	HPI Brazil Holdings LLC	
United States	HPI Federal LLC	
United States	HPI J1 Holdings LLC	
United States	HPQ Holdings, LLC	
United States	Peridot Print LLC	
United States	Tall Tree Insurance Company	
United States	Hewlett-Packard Development Company, L.P.	
Vietnam	HP Technology Vietnam Company Ltd	
Vietnam	HP Technology Vietnam Company Ltd (Hanoi Branch)	

== See also ==
- Lists of corporate assets
- List of acquisitions by Hewlett-Packard
