= List of acquisitions by Hewlett-Packard =

Hewlett-Packard logo

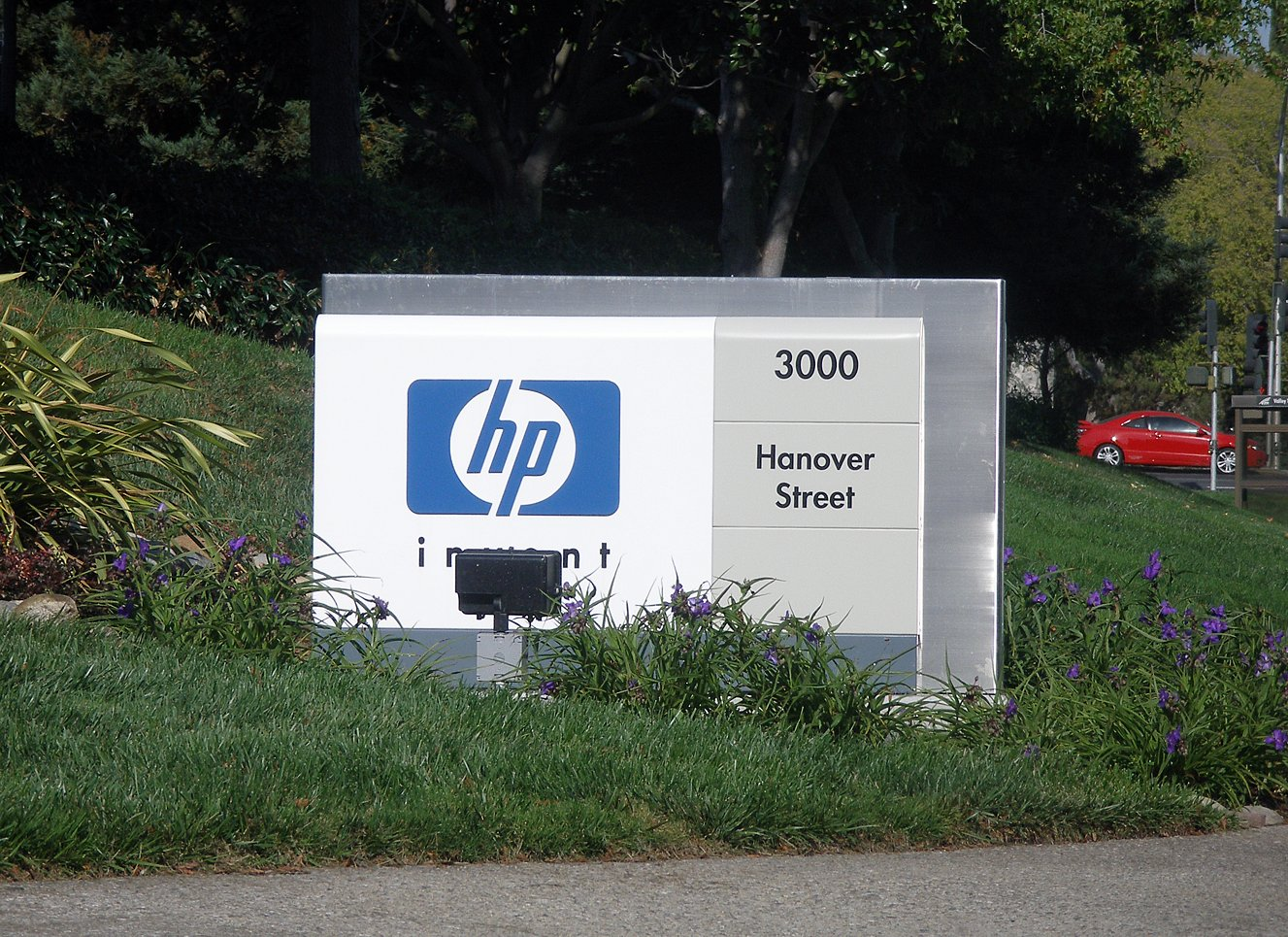
A welcome sign at the main entrance of the HP headquarters in Palo Alto

Hewlett-Packard, commonly referred to as HP, was an electronics technology company based in Palo Alto, California. Before its 2015 split into two companies, it was known as a leading developer and manufacturer of personal computers, enterprise servers, storage devices, networking products, software, and a range of printers and other imaging products, as well as a provider of services and consulting. In 2012, HP was the largest technology company in the world in terms of revenue, ranking 10th in the Fortune Global 500.

The company was founded by Bill Hewlett and Dave Packard in a small garage on January 1, 1939, initially producing a line of electronic test and measurement equipment.

As of 2012, Hewlett-Packard had made a total of 129 acquisitions since 1986;^{[a]} The majority of companies acquired by HP were based in the United States.

Its first acquisition was the FL Moseley Company in 1958. This move enabled HP to enter the plotter market, the precursor to its leading role in the printer business. In 1989, HP purchased Apollo Computer for US$476 million, enabling HP to become the largest supplier of computer workstations. In 1995, the company bought another computer manufacturer, Convex Computer, for $150 million. In 2000, HP spun off its early measurement, chemical and medical businesses into an independent company named Agilent Technologies. The company's largest acquisition came in 2002, when it merged with Compaq, a personal computer manufacturer, for $25 billion. The combined company overtook Dell for the largest share of the personal computer market worldwide in the second quarter. Their last pre-split acquisition in the enterprise networking segment was Aruba Networks in March 2015 for $3 billion.

Within IT networking hardware and storage market segments, HP made acquisitions worth over $15 billion, including the 3PAR and 3COM acquisitions made in 2010, totaling over $5 billion. Its largest IT services and consulting acquisition was Electronic Data Systems in 2008 for $13.9 billion.

In the software products market segment, a stream of acquisitions helped strengthen HP's position. The largest software company purchased prior to 2011 was Mercury Interactive for $4.5 billion. This acquisition doubled the size of HP's software business to more than $2 billion in annual revenue.

In 2012 and 2013, HP had no acquisitions in any of its business segments as the firm was dealing with the aftermath of an $8.8 billion write-off, suffered as a result of its acquisition of British software company Autonomy Corporation for $11 billion in 2011. In 2014, HP returned to the acquisition market by acquiring computer networking software company Shunra.

On October 6, 2014, HP announced that it would split into two companies, Hewlett Packard Enterprise and HP Inc. The former focuses on enterprise infrastructure hardware, software and services, whilst the latter focuses on consumer markets with PCs and printers. On November 1, 2015, they became separate companies.

== Acquisitions ==
Each acquisition was for the respective company in its entirety, unless otherwise specified. The agreement date listed is the date of the agreement between HP and the subject of the acquisition, while the acquisition date listed is the exact date in which the acquisition completes. The value of each acquisition is usually the one listed at the time of the announcement. If the value of an acquisition is not listed, then it is undisclosed.

Agreement date^{[b]}	Acquisition date^{[b]}	Company	Business	Country	Value (US$)	Adjusted (US$)	References
—	1958	F.L. Moseley Company	Plotter	United States	—	—	
—	1959	Boonton Radio	Flight test instrumentation	United States	—	—	
—	1961	Sanborn Company	Medical equipment	United States	—	—	
—	November 1, 1962	Neely Enterprises	Sales/manufacturer's representative	United States	—	—	
—	1965	F&M Scientific Corporation	Analytical chemistry	United States	—	—	
—	1966	Data Systems, Inc	Information technology	United States	—	—	
—	January 1973	Hupe & Busch	Liquid chromatography	Germany	—	—	
—	December 1985	Cericor, Inc.	CAD - logic design	United States	—	—	
—	January 13, 1989	Eon Systems Inc.	Electronics	United States	—	—	
April 13, 1989	May 4, 1989	Apollo Computer	Computer workstations	United States	$476,000,000	$1.236×10^{9}	
—	November 1989	Certain assets of Optotech Inc.	Disk drive	United States	—	—	
—	January 1991	Applied Optoelectronic Tech	Automatic test equipment	United States	—	—	
—	November 1991	Avantek	Transistor	United States	—	—	
—	December 1991	ABB CADE	Computer software	United States	—	—	
—	September 1992	Colorado Memory Systems	Magnetic tape	United States	—	—	
—	September 1992	French and German units of Leasametric	Company leasing	United States	—	—	
—	October 1992	Computer systems from Texas Instruments	Computer systems	United States	—	—	
—	1993	Ericsson Hewlett Packard Telecom (EHPT) 60% Ericsson and 40% Hewlett-Packard.	Telecoms	Sweden	—	—	
—	April 1993	Four Pi Systems Corp.	Automatic test equipment	United States	—	—	
June 1993	—	Metrix Network Systems	Computer networking	United States	—	—	
—	September 1993	BT&D Technologies	Electronics	United States	—	—	
September 13, 1993	October 1993	EEsof Inc.	Computer software	United States	—	—	
October 31, 1994	1994	Versatest	Automatic test equipment	United States	—	—	
1993	1994	Canstar Systems (an Alcatel Canada Wire Inc division)	Fibre Channel switch	Canada	—	—	
—	June 1995	CaLan Inc.	Automatic test equipment	United States	—	—	
September 21, 1995	September 1995	Convex Computer	Computer manufacturer	United States	$150,000,000	$317,000,000	
—	December 1995	ElseWare Corp.	Computer programming	United States	—	—	
February 22, 1996	February 1996	SecureWare Internet security division	Computer security	United States	—	—	
—	June 1996	Graphics technology from Parametric Technology Corporation	Graphics hardware	United States	$9,273,000	$19,000,000	
—	June 1996	Division Inc.	Computer programming	United States	$6,000,000	$12,000,000	
—	July 1996	DP-Tek Development	Imaging	United States	—	—	
—	August 1996	Trellis Software & Controls	Motion control	United States	—	—	
—	March 1997	Vital Technology Pte Ltd	Investment	United States	—	—	
April 23, 1997	April 1997	VeriFone	Electronic bill payment	United States	$1,180,000,000	$2.367×10^{9}	
—	June 6, 1997	PROLIN	Information technology	Netherlands	—	—	
—	September 1997	Internet printing technology from ForeFront Group	Printing	United States	$2,500,000	$5,000,000	
—	November 1997	Nuview ManageX from Nuview Inc.	Business process management	United States	—	—	
—	November 1997	Optimazation systems	Computer software	United States	—	—	
—	January 1998	Business related assets of Siltek	Information technology	South Africa	—	—	
—	March 27, 1998	Heartstream	Medical equipment	United States	—	—	
—	June 1998	Computing & Measurement Systems	Computers	Israel	—	—	
—	October 1998	Scope Communications Inc.	Cable tester	United States	—	—	
—	October 1998	Open Skies, Inc.	Computer software	United States	—	—	
—	May 1999	Printmountain	Printing	United Kingdom	—	—	
—	May 1999	Telegra Corp	Computer software	United States	—	—	
—	May 4, 1999	Transoft Networks	Storage area network	United States	—	—	
—	June 7, 1999	Dazel Corporation	Computer software	United States	—	—	
—	August 4, 1999	Security Force Software	Computer security	United States	—	—	
—	September 21, 1999	Qosnetics	Information technology	United States	—	—	
—	January 18, 2001	Bluestone Software	Computer software	United States	$470,000,000	$855,000,000	
July 16, 2001	August 6, 2001	Comdisco Inc.	Information technology	United States	$610,000,000	$1.109×10^{9}	
—	August 28, 2001	Trinagy Inc.	Computer software	United States	—	—	
—	September 24, 2001	StorageApps	Data storage	United States	$350,000,000	$636,000,000	
September 6, 2001	March 22, 2002	Indigo N.V	Printing service	Israel	—	—	
September 3, 2001	May 3, 2002	Compaq	Personal computer	United States	$25,000,000,000	$4.5457×10^{10}	
—	May 6, 2003	Procter & Gamble IT	Information technology	United States	$3,000,000,000	$5.251×10^{9}	
—	June 4, 2003	Ericsson IT	Information technology	Sweden	—	—	
—	July 23, 2003	PipeBeach	Communication software	Sweden	—	—	
August 13, 2003	—	Extreme Logic Inc.	Information technology	United States	—	—	
September 3, 2003	—	Talking Blocks	Web services management	United States	—	—	
—	September 22, 2003	SelectAccess assets of Baltimore Technologies	Computer security	United Kingdom	—	—	
November 11, 2003	—	Persist Technology	Computer software	United States	—	—	
—	February 16, 2004	Consera Software	Computer software	United States	—	—	
February 23, 2004	—	Triaton GmbH	Information technology	Germany	—	—	
March 11, 2004	—	TruLogica	Computer software	United States	—	—	
—	April 2, 2004	Novadigm Inc.	Computer software	United States	—	—	
—	May 13, 2004	IT Infrastructure Management LLC (doing business as ManageOne)	Information technology consulting	United States	—	—	
—	May 13, 2004	CEC Europe Service Management	Information technology consulting	United Kingdom	—	—	
—	June 7, 2004	Networking technology from Riverstone Networks	Computer networking	United States	—	—	
—	October 1, 2004	Synstar	Information technology	United Kingdom	—	—	
—	January 2005	IT division of West LB AG	Information technology	Germany	—	—	
—	April 15, 2005	Snapfish	Photo sharing	United States	—	—	
September 7, 2005	—	CGNZ	Information technology consulting	New Zealand	—	—	
September 19, 2005	—	AppIQ	Data storage	United States	—	—	
October 3, 2005	—	RLX Technologies	Computer software	United States	—	—	
—	November 1, 2005	Scitex Vision	Printing service	Israel	$230,000,000	$379,000,000	
November 30, 2005	—	Trustgenix Inc.	Computer software	United States	—	—	
December 13, 2005	—	PIXACO	Online photo services	Germany	—	—	
—	December 19, 2005	Peregrine Systems	Computer software	United States	$425,000,000	$701,000,000	
February 7, 2006	—	OuterBay	Computer software	United States	—	—	
June 6, 2006	—	Silverwire	Imaging	Switzerland	—	—	
—	June 27, 2006	The Technology Partners	Information technology consulting	Italy	—	—	
September 28, 2006	October 31, 2006	VoodooPC	Computer manufacturer	Canada	—	—	
July 26, 2006	November 7, 2006	Mercury Interactive	Computer software	Israel	$4,500,000,000	$7.187×10^{9}	
December 12, 2006	—	Knightsbridge Solutions	Information management	United States	—	—	
December 20, 2006	—	Bitfone Corp.	Computer software	United States	—	—	
February 5, 2007	—	Bristol Technology	Computer software	United States	—	—	
February 27, 2007	—	Polyserve	Computer software	United States	—	—	
March 22, 2007	—	Tabblo Inc.	Computer software	United States	—	—	
April 24, 2007	—	Arteis	Computer software	United States	—	—	
June 19, 2007	—	SPI Dynamic Inc.	Computer software	United States	—	—	
—	July 23, 2007	Opsware	Computer software	United States	$1,600,000,000	$2.484×10^{9}	
July 23, 2007	—	Neoware	Thin client	United States	$214,000,000	$332,000,000	
September 13, 2007	—	MacDermid ColorSpan Inc.	Printer manufacturer	United States	—	—	
October 22, 2007	—	Atos Origin Middle East Group	Information technology consulting	Bahrain	—	—	
November 12, 2007	February 2008	EYP Mission Critical Facilities Inc.	Information technology consulting	United States	—	—	
—	March 2008	NUR Macroprinters Ltd	Printer	Israel	$457,076,000	$683,000,000	
January 22, 2008	March 26, 2008	Exstream Software	Computer software	United States	$371,000,000	$555,000,000	
March 31, 2008	—	TOWER Software	Computer software	Australia	$101,529,000	$152,000,000	
August 11, 2008	—	Colubris Networks	Wireless networking	United States	—	—	
—	August 26, 2008	Electronic Data Systems	Information technology consulting	United States	$13,900,000,000	$2.0786×10^{10}	
October 1, 2008	—	LeftHand Networks Inc.	Data storage	United States	$360,000,000	$538,000,000	
July 17, 2009	August 4, 2009	IBRIX, Inc.	Computer software	United States	—	—	
November 11, 2009	April 12, 2010	3Com	Computer networking	United States	$2,700,000,000	$4.052×10^{9}	
—	June 24, 2010	Melodeo	Computer software	United States	$30,000,000	$44,000,000	
April 16, 2010	June 16, 2010	Instant-on operating systems from Phoenix Technologies	Computer software	United States	$12,000,000	$18,000,000	
April 28, 2010	July 1, 2010	Palm, Inc.	Smartphone manufacturer	United States	$1,200,000,000	$1.772×10^{9}	
August 1, 2010	August 26, 2010	Stratavia	Computer software	United States	—	—	
September 2, 2010	September 27, 2010	3PAR	Data storage	United States	$2,350,000,000	$3.470×10^{9}	
August 17, 2010	September 22, 2010	Fortify Software	Computer software	United States	—	—	
September 13, 2010	October 22, 2010	ArcSight	Corporate computer security management	United States	$1,500,000,000	$2.215×10^{9}	
February 14, 2011	March 22, 2011	Vertica Systems, Inc.	Enterprise database software	United States	$350,000,000	$501,000,000	
August 18, 2011	October 3, 2011	Autonomy Corporation	Information management	United Kingdom	$11,000,000,000	$1.5743×10^{10}	
December 6, 2011	December 7, 2011	Hiflex	Information management	Germany	—	—	
—	February 2013	Memlane	Information technology	United States	—	—	
March 4, 2014	May 1, 2014	Shunra	Computer networking software	United States	—	—	
September 11, 2014	September 11, 2014	Eucalyptus	Cloud computing software	United States	—	—	
February 1, 2015	May 1, 2015	Voltage Security	Cloud security software	United States	—	—	
March 2, 2015	May 19, 2015	Aruba Networks	Mobile networking	United States	—	—	
May 26, 2015	May 26, 2015	ConteXtream	Networking software	United States	—	—	
February 3, 2016	February 3, 2016	Trilead (by HPE)	Data protection software	Switzerland	Undisclosed	Undisclosed	
May 9, 2016	May 9, 2016	RASA Networks (by HPE)	Network Performance and Analytics software	United States	Undisclosed	Undisclosed	
May 9, 2016	November 1, 2016	SGI (by HPE)	Computer hardware	United States	$275,000,000	$369,000,000	
September 12, 2016	November 1, 2017	Printing business of Samsung (by HP Inc.)	Printing and imaging	Korea, South	$1,050,000,000	$1.409×10^{9}	
January 17, 2017	February 17, 2017	SimpliVity (by HPE)	Hyper-converged infrastructure	United States	$650,000,000	$854,000,000	
January 23, 2017	January 23, 2017	Cloud Cruiser (by HPE)	Cloud cost management and optimization	United States	—	—	
March 7, 2017	April 5, 2017	Nimble Storage (by HPE)	Flash and hybrid data storage	United States	$1,090,000,000	$1.432×10^{9}	
February 24, 2021	June 1, 2021	HyperX (by HP Inc.)	Computer peripherals	United States	$425,000,000	$505,000,000	
July 27, 2021	October 1, 2021	Teradici (by HP Inc.)	Remote desktop software	Canada	—	—	
March 28, 2022	August 29, 2022	Poly (by HP Inc.)	Web conferencing	United States	$3,300,000,000	$3.631×10^{9}	
January 10, 2024	July 2, 2025	Juniper Networks (by HPE)	Computer networking	United States	$14,000,000,000	$1.4368×10^{10}	
February 18, 2025	February 28, 2025	Humane Inc. (by HP Inc.)	Consumer electronics	United States	$116,000,000	$116,000,000	

== See also ==
- List of assets owned by HP § Through acquisitions

== Notes ==
- ^{a} This figure by The Alacra Store includes acquisitions by companies that are eventually acquired by HP. The actual number of acquisitions included in this list is 96.
- ^{b} The acquisitions are ordered by acquisition dates. If the acquisition date is not available, then the acquisition is ordered by agreement dates.
