= Hillary 4 U and Me =

2007 YouTube video

"Hillary 4 U And Me" is a music video inspired by the Hillary Clinton 2008 Democratic primaries campaign. The song was created by former Bitfone executive Gene Wang, and performed by Bill Hopkins Rockin’ Orchestra. The video posted on YouTube on September 28, 2007 and soon after spread through Internet blogs which mostly criticized it for being too sappy-sweet and contrived, as demonstrated by the sample lyric "This lady knows how to lead/In this president’s race she will succeed!". The sappy nature of the song made it a hit internet meme, drawing over 500,000 views. The song is also described as a kitschy yet catchy tribute to Senator Clinton. The video was so reviled that some conspiracy theorists even posited that the video may have been secretly created by supporters of primary opponent Barack Obama as a fake failed response to the Yes We Can video.

Gene Wang released another video on April 18, 2008, entitled “Hillary in the House”. This next video contains the lyrics, “for all y’all in the blogosphere who didn’t want to see ‘Hillary 4 U And Me’, we’re not giving in and Hillary is gonna’ win.”

== Credits ==
- Music, Recording, Producer: Gene Wang
- Band: Bill Hopkins Rockin’ Orchestra
- Video: Michael Fasman
- Mixing and Mastering: Hal Ratliff
- Dedicated to Hillary Clinton supporters around the world.
