= Cityblooms =

American urban farming technology company

- Industry: Agricultural Technology
- Founded: 2001; 24 years ago
- Founder: Nick Halmos
- Headquarters: Santa Cruz, California, United States
- Key people: Nick Halmos, CEO
- Website: cityblooms.com

Cityblooms is an urban farming technology company currently located in Santa Cruz, California. The company was founded by CEO Nick Halmos in 2001. In 2010 the company began developing modular hydroponic systems that leverage Internet-of-Things technology to grow premium produce for local distribution.

In 2014, Cityblooms partnered with Plantronics, Inc. to install a computer-controlled micro-farm at the company’s global headquarters in Santa Cruz. The project has been recognized for its innovation in reducing food miles and improving resource consumption.
