= Knightsbridge Solutions =

Defunct American consultancy company

Knightsbridge Solutions LLC
- Company type: Private company
- Industry: Consulting
- Founded: 1994
- Founders: Ki Chan, Jay Desai, Terrence Ryan, and Faisal Shah
- Defunct: 2007
- Fate: Acquired
- Successor: Hewlett-Packard
- Headquarters: Chicago, United States
- Area served: United States
- Products: Enterprise-level information management services including business intelligence, data warehousing, data integration, and information quality
- Number of employees: 700 (2007)

Knightsbridge Solutions was a Chicago-based professional services consultancy providing enterprise-level information management services, including business intelligence (BI), data warehousing, data integration, and information quality. It was acquired by Hewlett-Packard (HP) in 2007.

According to Gartner Research, prior to HP's purchase, Knightsbridge had "been a strong contender in the North American BI and data integration markets, differentiating itself from other 'boutique' vendors through its range of capabilities, and from larger consulting firms through its focus. This balance allowed it to act as a local provider while having the breadth and depth of a large firm."

== History ==
Knightsbridge Solutions was co-founded in 1994 by Ki Chan, Jay Desai, Terrence Ryan and Faisal Shah. Roderick S. Walker joined the board and became the company's president and CEO in 1999. Headquartered in Chicago, it maintained offices in Houston, London, New York, San Francisco, and Washington, D.C. At its height, the company had more than 700 employees.

The company's services include strategy and program management, information management, global delivery and managed services. It advised, developed and managed implementation in multiple industries, including communications, consumer products, energy, entertainment, federal government, financial services, health and life sciences, insurance, manufacturing, media, retail, and technology.

Its clients included AIG, Allstate, Bank of America, Capital One, Coca-Cola, Intuit, Kaiser Permanente, Liberty Mutual, McDonald's, Excellus BlueCross BlueShield, Blue Cross Blue Sheid of Michigan, Nordstrom, Novartis, Pfizer, Visa and Wachovia Bank. Following its acquisition by HP, Knightsbridge Solutions was merged with HP's Technology Solutions Group, and later into the HP Business Intelligence Solutions Group.
