= Pulsar 590 =

- Manufacturer: Plantronics
- Type: Headset
- Connectivity: Bluetooth
- Power: Battery

Pulsar 590A and Pulsar 590E are bluetooth headsets. They are designed for use with Bluetooth and A2DP (for stereo listening) enabled cellphones; including many Nokia, Sony, LG Group, Motorola, and Palm models; most other bluetooth enabled devices; or with the Plantronics universal adapter. Unlike most bluetooth headsets, the Pulsar 590A/E has stereo capabilities, meaning it can do two separate audio channels.

== Specifications ==
- Battery Life: listen time of up to 10 hours, talk time of up to 12 hours, standby time of about 130 hours, each time varying by device, and a charge time of 2 hours.
- Battery type lithium ion polymer.
- Weight 3.45 ounces (97.7 grams).
- Bluetooth version 2.0.
- Headset Speakers 28 mm Neodymium.
- Speaker frequency response: Telephony 300 Hz to 3600 Hz (CVSD u-Law), Stereo Audio 20 Hz to 20 kHz (16-bit 48 kHz SBC Coding).
- Impedance 32 ± 4 ohms @ 1 kHz.
- Distortion <5% to 19 kHz.

== Critical reception ==
A review in the New York Times called the Pulsar 590 headphones "routers for the ears", praising the wireless connectivity and ability for the device to handle both music and phone calls simultaneously.

CNet gave the 590A 3.5/5, praising the battery life, sound quality, and ease of use, and reporting sound quality was quite good though people could still tell you were talking on a cellphone. MobileTechReview praised its sound quality, bluetooth performance, and looks, and gave it 4.5/5. Stuff gave it 5/5, finding the styling a bit too "office"-like, but otherwise positive.
