= Kenneth Kannappan =

- Occupations: President and CEO of Plantronics

S. Kenneth Kannappan was president and chief executive officer of Plantronics, a maker of telephone headsets based in Santa Cruz, California, and has been a member of the board of directors since 1999.

Kannappan has a Bachelor of Arts degree in economics from Yale University, and a Master of Business Administration from Stanford University. From August 1985 to January 1995 he was senior vice president of investment banking at Kidder, Peabody & Co. In 1995 he became vice president of Plantronics, in 1998 became chief executive officer and in 1999 was appointed to its board of directors. On August 2, 2016 Plantronics announced his retirement as of October 2.
