= Aurasma =

Augmented reality development platform

- Industry: Augmented reality
- Founded: May 5, 2011; 15 years ago (as Aurasma Lite)
- Headquarters: Dual HQ in London, UK and San Francisco, U.S.

Aurasma, later known as HP Reveal, was an augmented reality platform launched by HP Autonomy on May 5, 2011. Available as both a software development kit (SDK) and an application for Android and iOS, it leveraged mobile device cameras to overlay digital content—such as animations, videos, 3D models, or web pages—onto the physical world. In October 2011, HP acquired the platform and rebranded it as HP Reveal.

== History ==
Developed in Cambridge, England, by Autonomy, Aurasma showcased its technology for the first time in early 2011 at the MipTV Media Market in Cannes, France, presented by Matt Mills. The company released "Aurasma Lite" for the iPhone on May 5, 2011, followed by the Android version on June 10, 2011. The technology extended to other smartphone and tablet applications, first appearing in the promotional campaign for the 2011 film Super 8. The "Lite" designation was dropped from the mobile app name in a December 2012 update.

Following the acquisition by Hewlett-Packard Enterprise in October 2011, the platform rebranded to "HP Reveal." Annie Weinberger led the company as the general manager during this period. Under HP Autonomy, the app expanded to include white-label applications, SDKs, and AR campaign tools. Despite the rebranding, "Aurasma Studio", a web-based service for creating "auras", remained available to users.

In September 2017, Hewlett-Packard divested Autonomy to Micro Focus, which sought integration with HP Autonomy. Nevertheless, HP Reveal ceased operations in February 2020.

== Industry Awards and Views ==
In 2011, Aurasma, as presented by Matt Mills, received the DEMOgod and "People's Choice" awards at DEMO. The following year at the Consumer Electronics Show in Las Vegas, Nevada, Aurasma was a finalist for CNET's "Best of CES" award. It also secured "Best AR App" and "Best Overall AR" at the 2012 AR Summit Awards, alongside the "Award for Technical Innovation" at the International Brand Video Awards. Applications powered by Aurasma technology, such as the Marvel AR mobile app, garnered accolades like the 2012 Mobile Excellence Award for "Best App for Entertainment".

Despite these accolades, some critics expressed skepticism. For instance, in 2013, Jonathan Margolis of the Financial Times characterized Aurasma as "ambitious but staggeringly useless".
