= Hewlett-Packard Israel =

Subsidiary of Hewlett-Packard

- Headquarters: Ra'anana, Israel
- Website: www8.hp.com/il/he/home.html

Hewlett-Packard Israel (Hebrew: היולט-פקארד ישראל) offers products of hardware, technology, and services to consumers, businesses, and public administration. The company offers machinery, printers, digital imaging devices such as cameras and scanners, netbooks, laptops, workstations, electronic devices and devices for connection to the Internet. HP Israel was founded in 1998, and is headquartered in Ra'anana, Israel. HP Israel is a subsidiary of the US company HP Inc.

HP Israel has provided services and advanced technology to the Israel Defense Forces, including the administration of the electronic infrastructure of the Israeli Navy. HP Israel, has supplied the Basel system to the Israeli Ministry of Defense, and has taken over its development, installation, and maintenance on the ground. The Basel access and control system is a system of biometric sensors. This system is installed in the Israeli military checkpoints, which are on the border with the Gaza Strip and in the West Bank.

In 2011, the Israeli Ministry of Defense responded to a question that had been asked by Who profits?, in relation to the Basel control system, confirming that HP Israel, was hired by the Israeli Ministry of Defense, to operate and maintain in operation the Basel control system. The Ministry of Defense of Israel indicated that the system had been installed at the following checkpoints in the West Bank: Jericho, Bethlehem, Jenin, Nablus, Tulkarem, Hebron, Abu Dis, Tarkumia, and near the door of Efraim.

In 2014, the Israeli Ministry of Defense responded to a question about the freedom of information asked by Who Profits?. The ministry told the media that HP Israel had been hired to keep the Basel biometric sensor system operational at the Israeli checkpoints, at least until the year 2015.

In 2023, HP Israel's parent company HP Inc. came again under criticism for its cooperation with the IDF in relation to the Israeli invasion of the Gaza Strip. The BDS movement has called for consumers and organizations to boycott all HPE IT services and products as well as printers, computers, and printer cartridges from HP Inc.

In 2025, Hewlett Packard Enterprise was identified in a report by the Office of the United Nations High Commissioner for Human Rights that listed companies facilitating the occupation of Palestine. The report states:

"Before IBM, Hewlett Packard Enterprises (HPE) maintained the database and its Israeli subsidiary is still providing servers. Hewlett Packard (HP) has long enabled the apartheid systems of Israel, supplying technology to the Coordination of Government Activities in the Territories (COGAT), the prison service and police. Since the 2015 split of the company into Hewlett Packard Enterprises and HP Inc., opaque business structures have obscured the roles of their seven remaining Israeli subsidiaries."
