= Exstream =

American document management company

OpenText Exstream
- Industry: Document Management
- Founded: 1998
- Headquarters: Lexington, Kentucky, USA
- Products: OpenText Exstream
- Parent: OpenText
- Website: OpenText Exstream

Exstream Software is a document management company based in Lexington, Kentucky, founded by Davis Marksbury and Dan Kloiber in 1998.

The company's principal product is the Exstream software platform, which enterprise clients use to create, manage and deliver both electronic and print deliverables to customers and clients.

== Overview ==
In March 2008, Exstream Software was acquired by HP and was identified as HP Exstream.

In June 2016, HP Exstream was acquired by OpenText, integrating Exstream with their own software suite StreamServe, and is now correctly identified as OpenText Exstream.

=== Services ===
The company provides different kinds of services (OpenText):

- consultations;
- information management;
- learning and education (Voyager Academy);
- cloud management.

== See also ==
- Customer communications management
- Document automation
- Document management system
