= Plantronics =

American electronics company

Plantronics, Inc.
- Logo used before being acquired by HP Inc.
- Trade name: Poly
- Type: Subsidiary
- Industry: Consumer electronics
- Founded: 1961; 65 years ago
- Successor: HP Inc. (HP Poly)
- Headquarters: Santa Cruz, California, U.S.
- Key people: Dave Shill (President and CEO)
- Products: Enterprise and consumer audio products, software and services
- Revenue: ▼US$1.68 billion (2022)
- Operating income: ▼US$−32 million (2022)
- Net income: ▲US$17.9 million (2022)
- Total assets: ▼US$2.23 billion (2022)
- Total equity: ▲US$20.2 million (2022)
- Number of employees: c. 6,500 (April 2022)
- Parent: HP Inc.
- Subsidiaries: Polycom, Inc.
- Website: hp.com/ca-en/poly.html
- Footnotes; Financials as of April 2, 2022.

Plantronics, Inc., previously doing business as Poly, is an American multinational electronics company producing audio communications equipment for business and consumers. Its products support unified communications, mobile use, gaming and music. Plantronics is headquartered in Santa Cruz, California, and most of its products are produced in China and Mexico.

On March 18, 2019, Plantronics announced that it would change its name to Poly following its acquisition of Polycom in 2018, although it continues to trade on the New York Stock Exchange as Plantronics, Inc. (POLY; listed as PLT until May 24, 2021).

On March 28, 2022, HP Inc. announced its intent to acquire Poly for $1.7 billion in cash as it looks to bolster its hybrid work offerings, such as headsets and video conferencing hardware. Including debt, the deal valued at $3.3 billion and closed in August 2022. Plantronics, Inc. continues to exist as a subsidiary of HP Inc. as a part of their HP Poly division.

== History ==
Logo prior to being rebranded as Poly

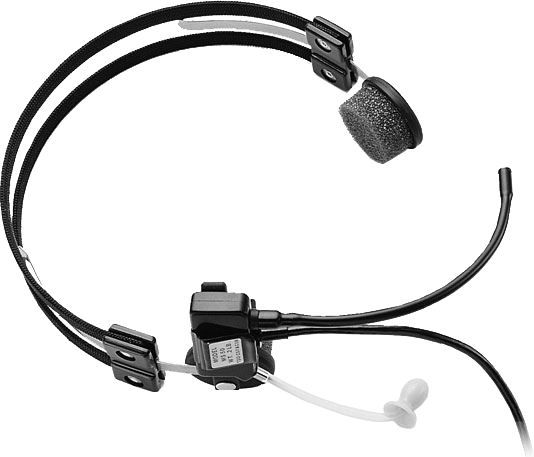
Early Plantronics headset

In the early 1960s, airline headsets were so large and cumbersome that many pilots had switched back to the use of handheld microphones for communications. The speed and complexity of jet airliners caused a need for the introduction of small, lightweight headsets into the cockpit. In 1961, United Airlines solicited new designs from anyone who was interested. Courtney Graham, a United Airlines pilot, was one of the many who thought the heavy headsets should be replaced by something lighter. He collaborated with his pilot friend Keith Larkin to create a small, functional design which was robust enough to pass airlines standards. (Larkin had been working for a small company called Plane-Aids, a Japanese import company which offered spectacles and sunglasses that contained transistor radios in their temple pieces.) The final design, incorporating two small hearing aid-style transducers attached to a headband was submitted to United Airline approval. UAL's approval of the innovative design caused Graham and Larkin to incorporate as Pacific Plantronics (now called Plantronics, Inc.) on May 18, 1961. They introduced the first lightweight communications headset, the MS-50, to the commercial marketplace in 1962.

In the mid-1960s, the Federal Aviation Agency selected Plantronics as the sole supplier of headsets for air traffic controllers, and thereafter was selected to supply headsets to the operators of the Bell System.

== SPENCOMM and NASA ==
In 1961, NASA astronaut Wally Schirra contacted Courtney Graham, a fellow pilot, to discuss creating a design for a small, lightweight headset to be used in the Mercury spacecraft.

Pacific Plantronics assembled its Space Environmental Communications (SPENCOMM) division to begin working on a reliable solution. SPENCOMM personnel traveled to NASA's Manned Spacecraft Center (now Johnson Space Center) and Kennedy Space Center to meet with and get design feedback from Schirra and several other astronauts, including Gordon Cooper.

Plantronics and NASA's work also involved adapting lightweight headset technology for spacecraft communications, including the development of microphone and receiver systems designed for use with astronaut helmets. NASA documentation from the period records the use of Plantronics headsets in space-related communication applications, reflecting the company's role in the development and application of lightweight communications equipment for aerospace use.

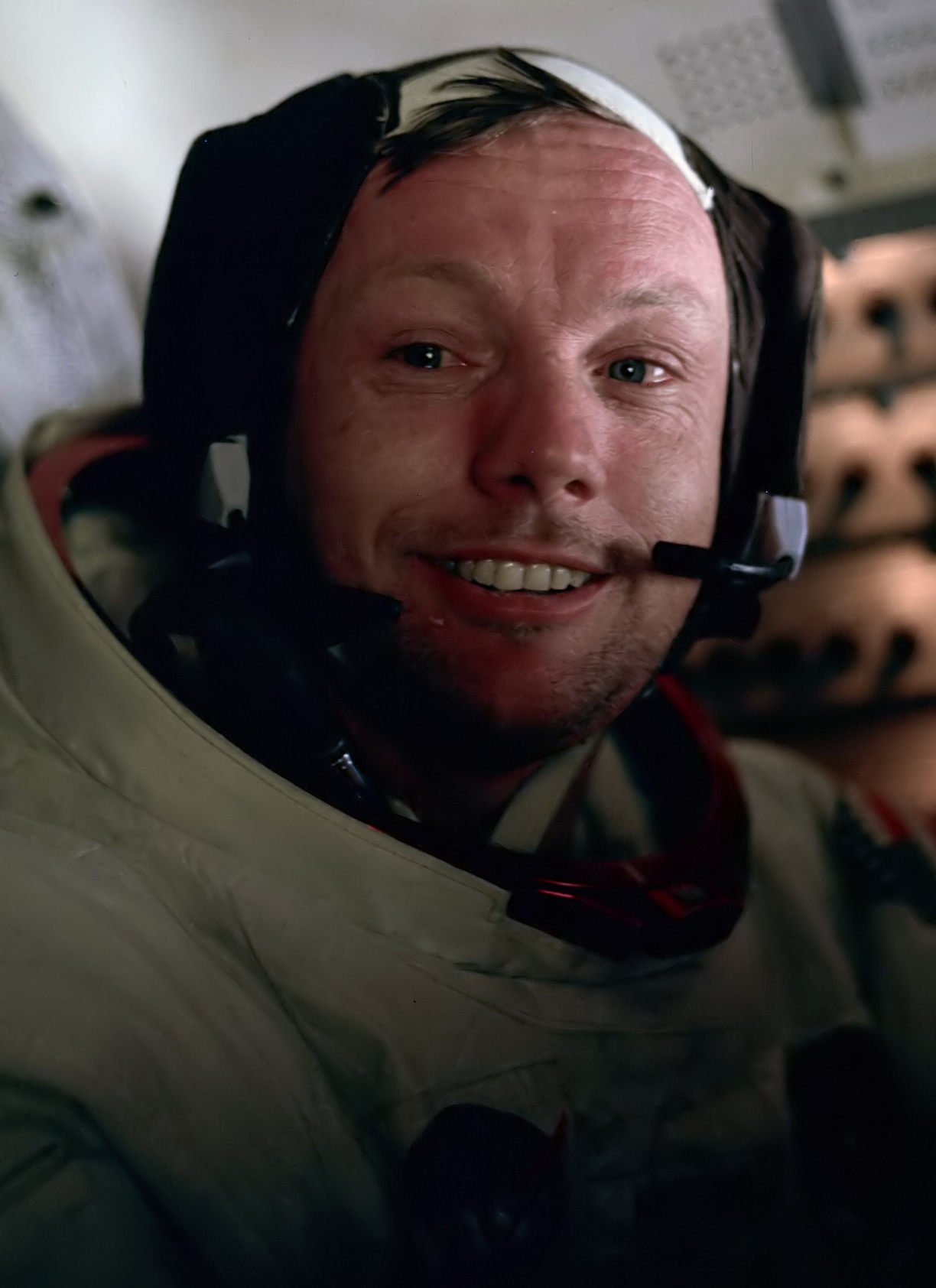
Neil Armstrong with Plantronics headset

Together, SPENCOMM and NASA spent only 11 days to create a working microphone design for space communications and Schirra was the first to use the new communication technology during the Mercury-Atlas 8 mission. Significant redundancy was built into these headsets, as each microphone circuit had two transducers and each receiver had five transducers—in addition, the headsets were used in pairs. The use of these SPENCOMM-NASA headsets in astronaut space suits continued through the remainder of the Mercury program, the Apollo program and on to this day. The words spoken by U.S. astronaut Neil Armstrong as he stepped on the Moon were transmitted through a Plantronics headset.

== MS-50 ==
Following the Pacific Plantronics partnership with NASA in the Space Program, the MS-50 headset gained recognition in the communication marketplace. The FAA, Western Electric, and companies with telephone call centers adapted the MS-50 as a replacement for existing headsets.

On May 18, 1965, U.S. Pat. No. 3,184,556 was issued to W. K. Larkin for a

miniaturized headset wherein a hearing-aid size microphone transducer and a similarly miniaturized transducer are placed in a capsule mounted near the user's ear; speech is conducted to the microphone via an acoustic tube positioned near the user's mouth, while incoming communications emanating from the receiver are conducted to the user's ear via a second acoustic tube.

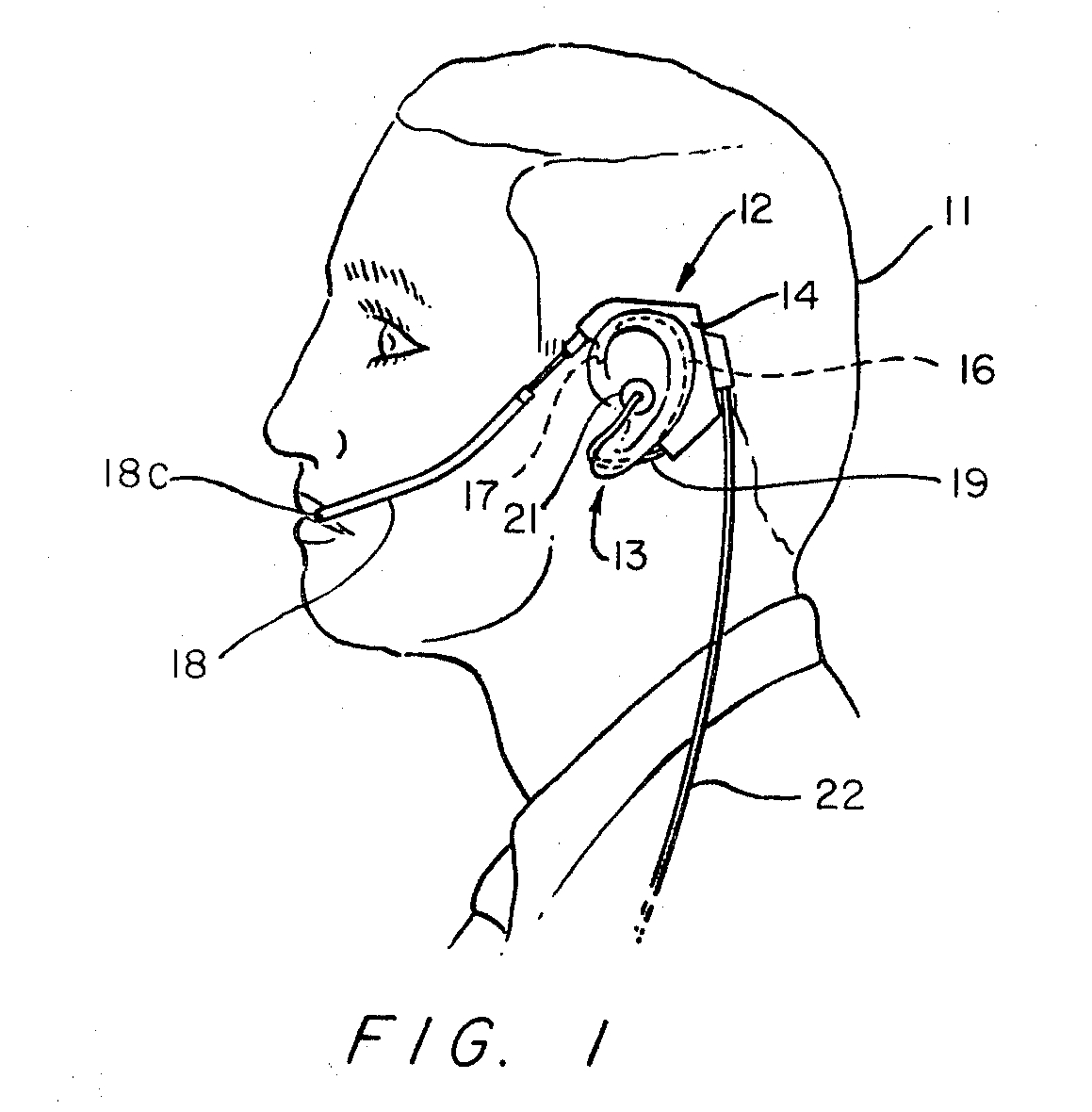
Plantronics StarSet patent drawing showing proposed use of invention

== StarSet ==
In 1970, Ken Hutchings, an engineer who had joined Pacific Plantronics, patented a device which was marketed as the "StarSet". United States Patent 3548118 describes

A self-supporting headset having a housing which accommodates a receiver and microphone. A flexible acoustic tube adapted to communicate between the auditory canal of the ear of the user and the receiver secured to the bottom of the housing, and an adjustable acoustic tube secured to the top of the housing with its distal end adapted to be disposed adjacent to the mouth of the user to transmit sound to the microphone.

== Wireless products ==
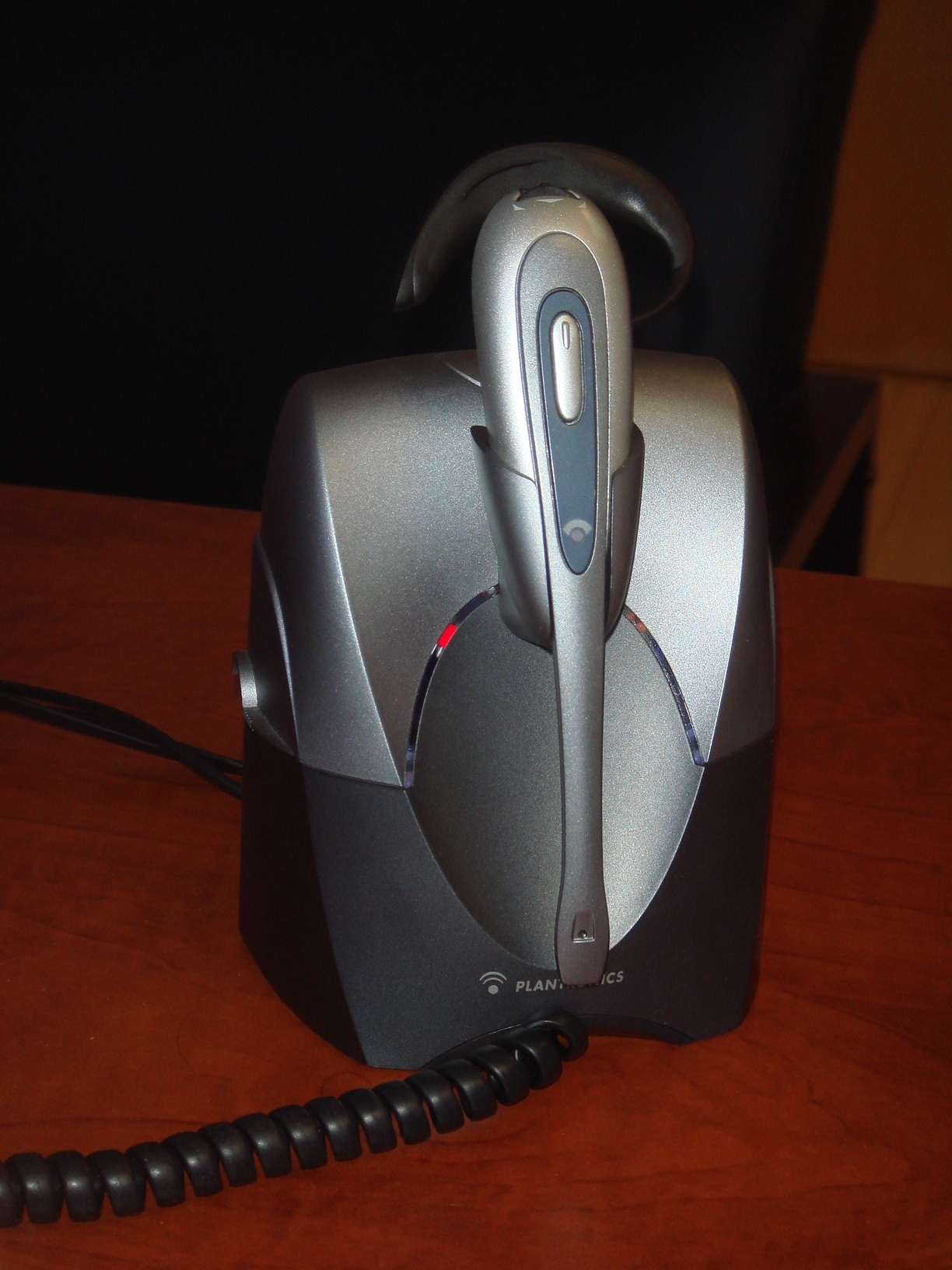
Plantronics office headset on its charger

In the 1980s, Plantronics created a line of cordless products using infrared technology. Though the technology utilized was the same one being used by television remote controls, the link did not require a Federal Communications Commission (FCC) telecommunications approval. One of the first products used the infrared beam to create a communications link between a small transmitter and a base unit which was connected to the telephone network. This product was the first "echo-free" speakerphone for use in conference rooms. The small transmitter could be handheld or clipped to clothing to ensure a good pickup of the speaker's voice.

=== Wireless office headsets ===
In 2003, Plantronics introduced the CS50 wireless headset for use on office phones. Since that time, Plantronics has manufactured other wireless headsets, including the "CS70N", CS500 Series, and Savi 700 Series. In recent years there has also been strong focus on Unified Communications headsets and speakers.

=== Mobile and Bluetooth mobile headsets ===
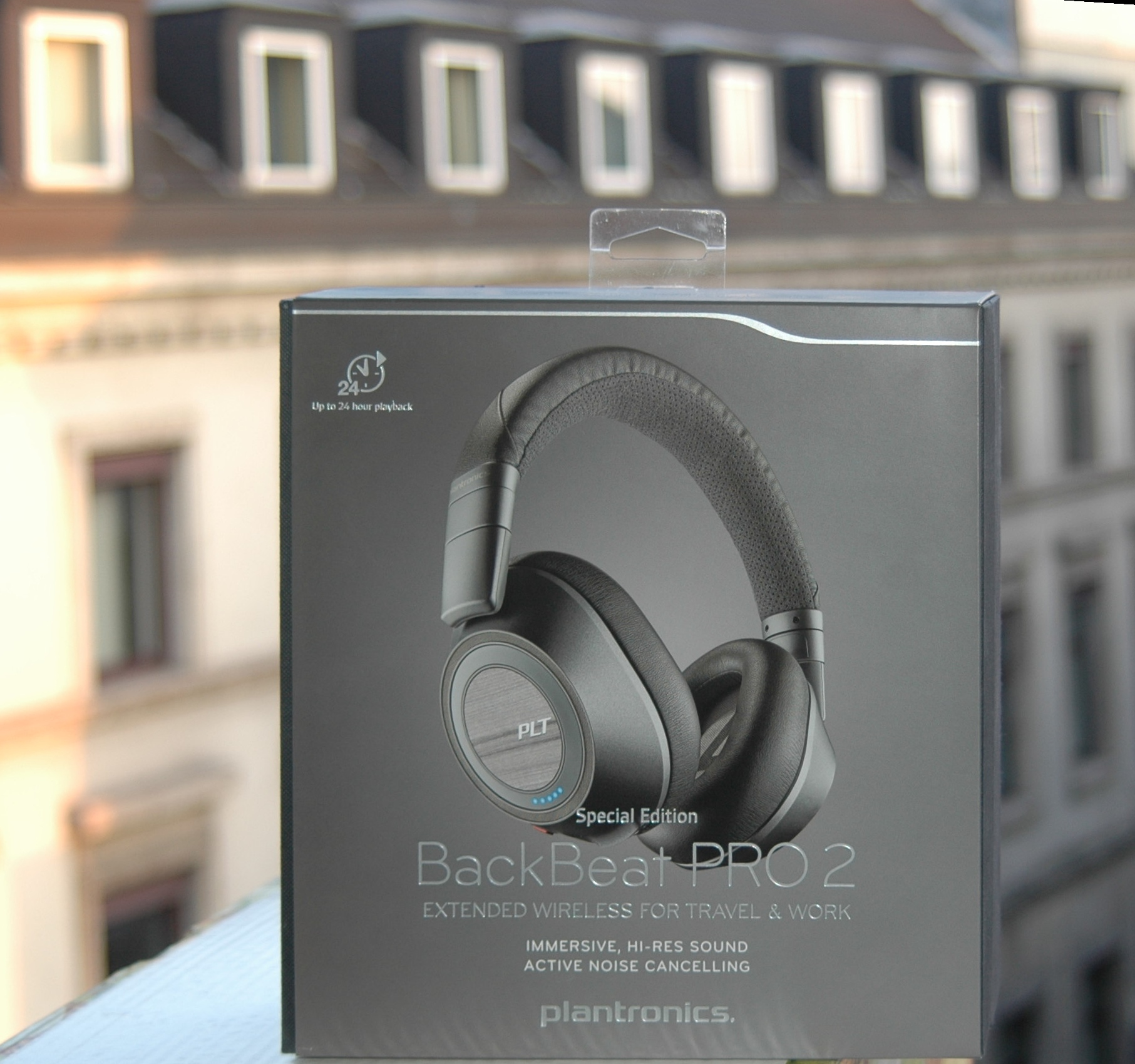
Plantronics BackBeat PRO 2 box

Plantronics manufactures mobile headsets, including a line of Bluetooth headsets for mobile phones. The Pulsar 590, for example, is designed for use with Bluetooth- and A2DP-enabled cellphones.

== Computer and gaming headsets ==
Plantronics manufactured headsets for PC audio and online and console gaming via its GameCom and .Audio and RIG Gaming labels. Plantronics entered the multimedia headset market in 1999 with the release of the HS1 and the DSP-500 headsets, the latter featuring a built-in digital signal processing card. In 2002, Plantronics and Microsoft created the headset for the Xbox Communicator, the first headset to enable voice communication with Xbox Live. The company created a special headset for the Xbox as a tie-in with the videogame Halo 2 in 2004. Plantronics exited the gaming and consumer markets in 2019, focusing on enterprise collaboration with its Poly brand.

== Corporate expansion and acquisitions ==
Plantronics has expanded into other segments of the audio equipment market through acquisitions.

=== Clarity ===
In 1986, Plantronics acquired Walker Equipment, Ringgold, Georgia, a manufacturer of amplified handsets and telephones. The Clarity products were created to enhance telephone usability for those with hearing impairment. Walker later acquired Ameriphone in 2002, and became Walker Ameriphone before changing its name to Clarity; Clarity is now a US supplier of amplified telephones. In February 2015, Plantronics released the Clarity 340 handset style phone for UC communications.

=== Altec Lansing ===
In 2005, Plantronics acquired computer speaker manufacturer Altec Lansing for approximately $166 million. In spite of a corporate makeover the brand continued to struggle and was acquired by Prophet Equity in October 2009 for approximately $18 million.

=== Volume Logic ===
Plantronics later acquired Octiv, Inc. in March 2005 as one of its brands and renamed it as the Volume Logic division. Octiv produced an audio toolset for creating 5.1 surround sound soundtracks. Although the Volume Logic series of applications have since been discontinued, the underlying technology has been adapted for use in Plantronics telephony products.

=== Polycom ===
On March 28, 2018, Plantronics announced it would acquire Polycom for approximately $2 billion.

=== 2005 to present ===
In October 2016, long-time chief executive S. Kenneth Kannappan retired and was replaced by Joe Burton, who had joined in 2011. On February 10, 2020, Plantronics announced the appointment of Robert Hagerty as interim CEO, replacing Joe Burton.

== Gallery ==
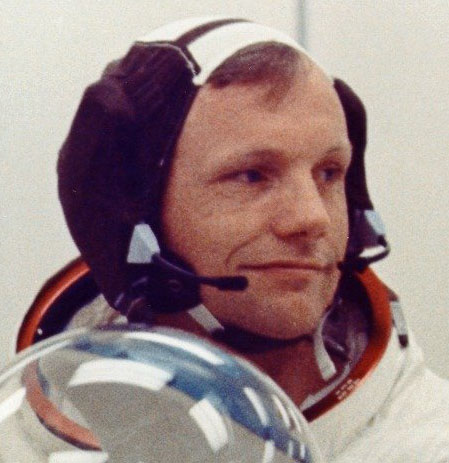
NASA Astronaut Neil Armstrong wearing "Snoopy cap" with Plantronics (SPENCOM) headset prior to his Apollo 11 lunar landing in 1969

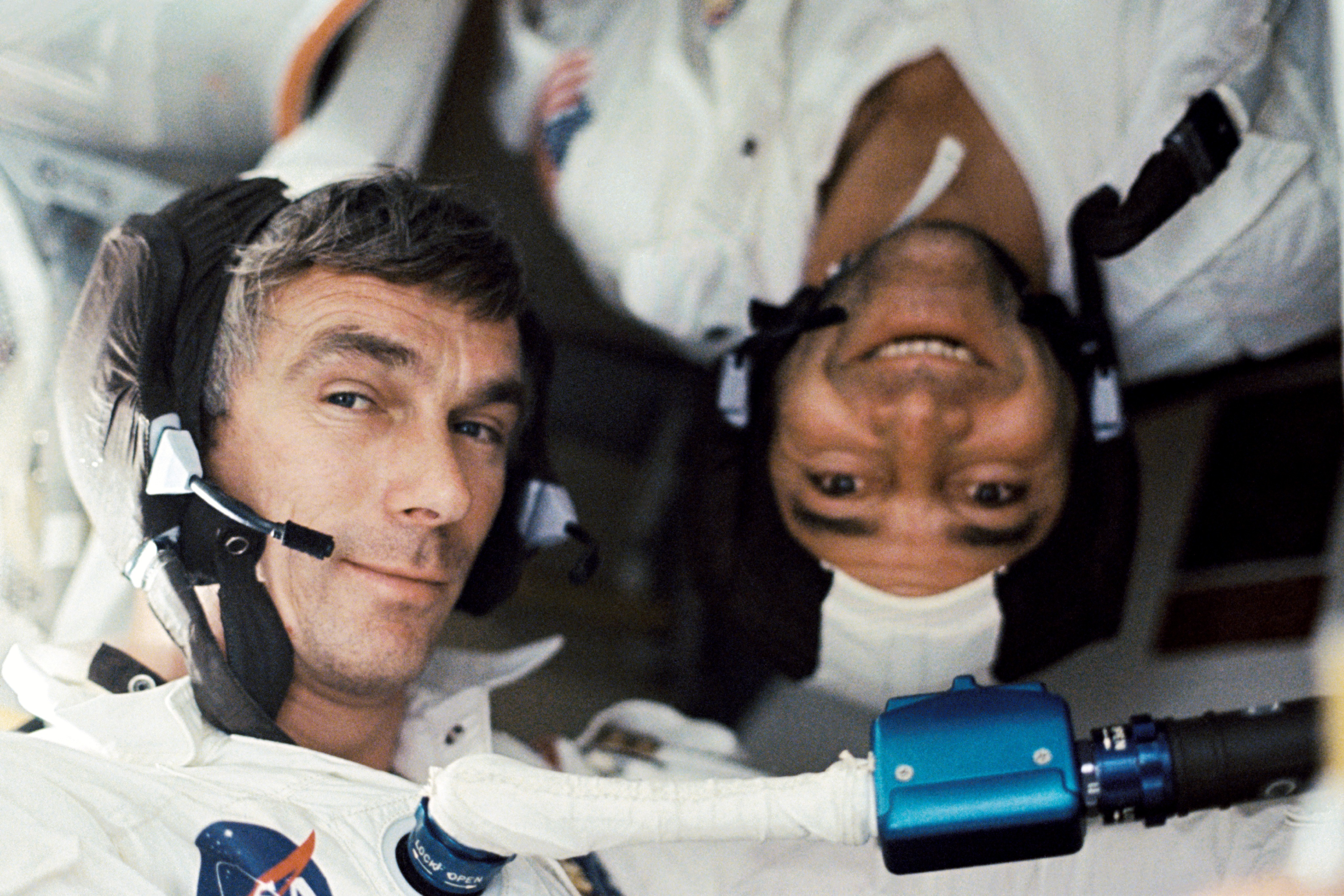
Plantronics (SPENCOM) headsets in use by NASA Astronauts Evans and Cernan, both wearing "Snoopy" caps, aboard the Apollo 17 spacecraft

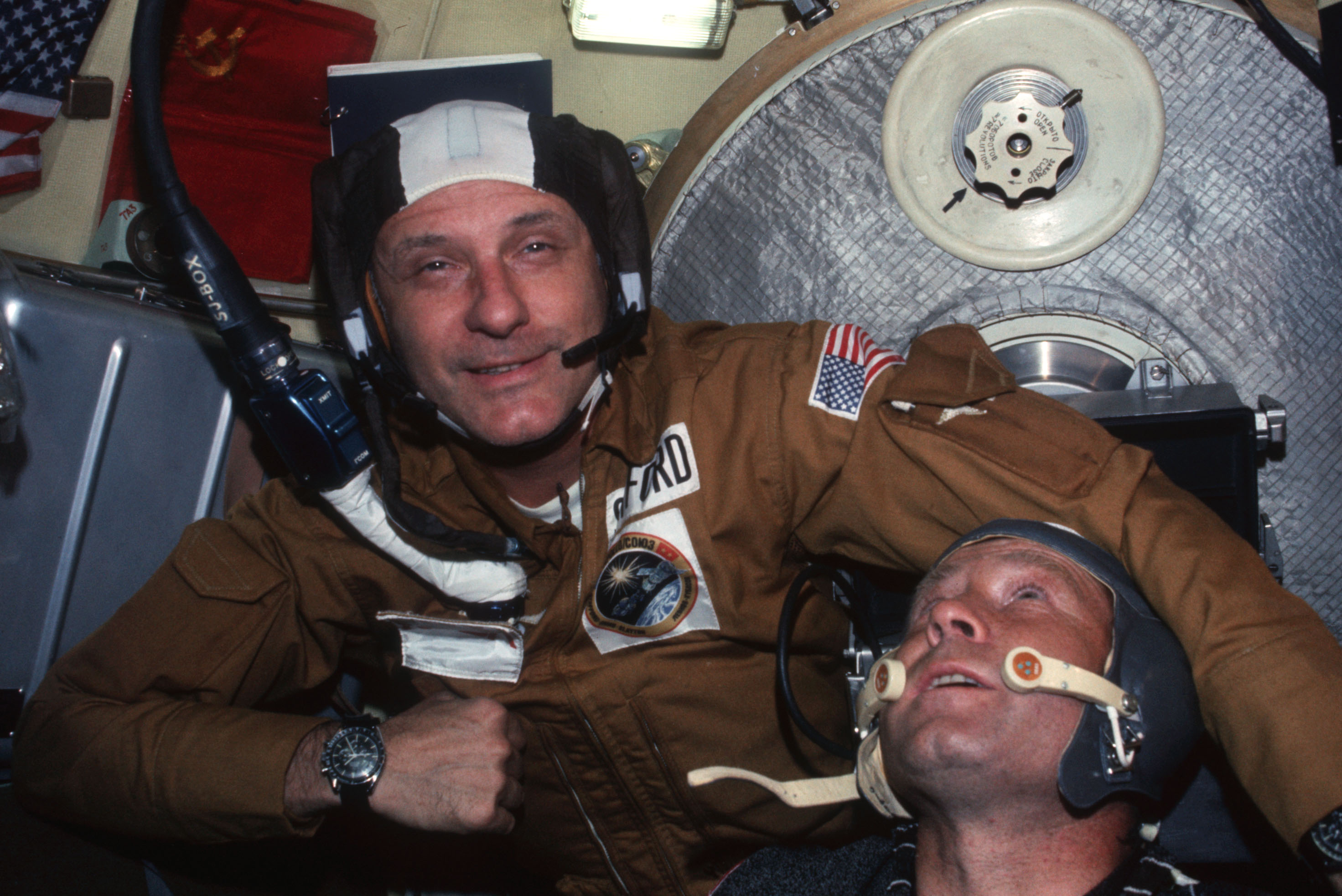
NASA Astronaut Tom Stafford wearing "Snoopy" cap with Plantronics (SPENCOM) headset for Apollo–Soyuz in 1975

== See also ==
- Plantronics Colorplus
