= Edward J. McCluskey =

American engineer

- Born: October 16, 1929; New York City, New York, U.S.A.
- Died: February 13, 2016 (aged 86); Palo Alto, California, U.S.A.
- Education: Massachusetts Institute of Technology
- Known for: Quine–McCluskey algorithm
- Children: Edward R. McCluskey, Rosemary McCluskey, Therese McCluskey, Joseph McCluskey, Kevin McCluskey, David McCluskey
- Scientific career
- Fields: Electrical engineering
- Thesis: Algebraic Minimization and the Design of Two-Terminal Contact Networks (1956)
- Doctoral advisor: Samuel H. Caldwell
- Notable students: Alvy Ray Smith; Janusz Brzozowski

Edward Joseph McCluskey (October 16, 1929 – February 13, 2016) was a professor at Stanford University. He was a pioneer in the field of Electrical Engineering.

== Biography ==
McCluskey was born October 16, 1929, in New York City. He graduated from Bowdoin College in 1953 and earned his Ph.D. in Electrical Engineering from Massachusetts Institute of Technology in 1956. McCluskey worked on electronic switching systems at the Bell Telephone Laboratories from 1955 to 1959. In 1959, he moved to Princeton University, where he was Professor of Electrical Engineering and Director of the University Computer Center. In 1966, he joined Stanford University, where he was Emeritus Professor of Electrical Engineering and Computer Science, as well as Director of the Center for Reliable Computing. He founded the Stanford Digital Systems Laboratory (now the Computer Systems Laboratory) in 1969 and the Stanford Computer Engineering Program (now the Computer Science MS Degree Program) in 1970. The Stanford Computer Forum (an Industrial Affiliates Program) was started by McCluskey and two colleagues in 1970 and he was its Director until 1978. Professor McCluskey led the Reliability and Testing Symposium (RATS). McCluskey served as the first President of the IEEE Computer Society. He died on February 13, 2016.

He was known for his disarming wit and occasional eccentric habits, like his hat collection.

== Focus of research ==
McCluskey developed the first algorithm for designing combinational circuits – the Quine–McCluskey logic minimization procedure – as a doctoral student at MIT. His 1956 thesis, supervised by Samuel H. Caldwell, was entitled Algebraic Minimization and the Design of Two-Terminal Contact Networks. At Bell Labs and Princeton, he developed the modern theory of transients (hazards) in logic networks and formulated the concept of operating modes of sequential circuits. He collaborated with Signetics researchers in developing one of the first practical multivalued logic implementations and then worked out a design technique for such circuitry.

His Stanford research focuses on logic testing, synthesis, design for testability, and fault-tolerant computing. Professor McCluskey and his students at the Center for Reliable Computing worked out many key ideas for fault equivalence, probabilistic modeling of logic networks, pseudo-exhaustive testing, and watchdog processors.

== Academic descendants ==
He proudly claimed his students as his main product. He had mentored over 70 PhD students and has an expanding family of academic 'grandchildren'. His direct students include Jacob A. Abraham, Daniel Siewiorek, Nur Touba, Subhasish Mitra, Mehdi Tahoori, Jacob Savir, and Ken Wagner; his academic 'grandchildren' include Prithviraj Banerjee, Wesley Kent Fuchs, and Mario Barbacci.

== Awards and honors ==
McCluskey is the recipient of the 1996 IEEE Emanuel R. Piore Award "for pioneering and fundamental contributions to design automation and fault tolerant computing."

He is also the recipient of the 2012 IEEE John von Neumann Medal, "for fundamental contributions that shaped the design and testing of digital systems."

McCluskey received the 2008 Computer Pioneer Award from the IEEE Computer Society "for seminal contributions to the design and synthesis of digital systems over five decades, including the first algorithm for logic synthesis (the Quine–McCluskey method);" he also earned the 1991 Taylor Booth Award for "outstanding service as a computer science & engineering educator and for inspiring students and educators alike through his prolific contribution as a teacher, author, curriculum developer & graduate research supervisor."

The IEEE Computer Society named its Technical Achievement Award in honor of McCluskey: The Edward J. McCluskey Technical Achievement Award.

He was a Fellow of the Institute of Electrical and Electronics Engineers (IEEE), the American Association for the Advancement of Science (AAAS), and the Association for Computing Machinery (ACM); and an elected member of the National Academy of Engineering (NAE) (1998).

He received honorary doctorates from the University of Grenoble and Bowdoin College.

He was honored at a special session of 2008 ACM/SIGDA San Jose, California on November 10–13, 2008, where tributes were shared by distinguished researchers Robert K. Brayton, Bernard Courtois, Giovanni De Micheli, Ravishankar K. Iyer, Daniel P. Siewiorek, Tom Williams and Yervant Zorian.

== See also ==
- List of pioneers in computer science
