= HPE Networking training =

HPE Networking offers trainings, typically delivered in HP Authorized Trainings Centers (ATCs) by HP Certified Instructors (HPCI).

HPE Networking training is an evolution of what HP ProCurve offered as training.

The titles are oriented at the HP Certified Professional Program (HPCP). Candidates can take most of the technical certification tests at Prometric Testcenters. Sales certification tests can be taken online in the Internet. Attending a course is currently not a

== AIS ==
The Accredited Integration Specialist (AIS) is the first level of technical certification.
