= HP Memory Spot chip =

The Memory Spot chip was an integrated circuit developed by Hewlett-Packard. The chip incorporates a central processing unit, random access memory and a wireless receiver, all bundled together in a device 1.4 or 2 mm^{2}. Compared to an RFID chip, it is reprogrammable, and provides 1000 times more storage capacity and data transfer rate.

The research to design and build the chip was done at HP Labs in Bristol.

Hewlett-Packard said that the chip is so small that it can be built into almost any object, and have proposed several possible uses. These include, but are not limited to:

- Ensuring that drugs have not been counterfeited
- Tagging patients' wristbands in hospitals
- Authenticating prescription-pill bottles
- Adding multimedia to postcards
- Incorporation into books
- Storing image files on printed pictures to print an identical copy

HP claimed that once the units are in mass-production, they may cost as little as one dollar each.

No batteries are needed because the chips get their power by induction from the devices which read the data.

Current wireless transfer speeds are 10 Mbit/s.

According to magazine Popular Science, the devices "can store and transfer up to four megabytes of data" and should be available on store shelves within two years (Mone 2006).

== Awards ==
- 2006 - Popular Science Best of What's New - General Innovation

== See also ==
- Radio Frequency Identification
