= List of ProCurve products =

HP ProCurve was the name of the networking division of Hewlett-Packard from 1998 to 2010 and associated with the products that it sold. The name of the division was changed to HP Networking in September 2010. Please use HP Networking Products for an actual list of products.

The HP ProCurve division sold network switches, wireless access points, WAN routers, and Access Control Servers/Software under the "HP ProCurve" brand name.

== Switching ==
=== Core Switches ===
- 8212zl Series - (Released September 2007) Core switch offering, 12-module slot chassis with dual fabric modules and options for dual management modules and system support modules for high availability (HA). IPV6-ready, 692 Gbit/s fabric. Up to 48 10GbE ports, 288 Gb ports, or 288 SFPs. Powered by a combination of either 875W or 1500W PSUs, to provide a maximum of 3600W (5400W using additional power supplies) of power for PoE.

=== Datacenter Switches ===
- 6600 Series - (Released February 2009) Datacenter switch offered in five versions. There are four switches with either 24 or 48 Gb ports, with two models featuring four 10GbE SFP ports. There is also a 24 port 10GbE version. All of these feature front to back cooling and removable power supplies.

=== Interconnect Fabric ===
- 8100fl series - Chassis based, 8 or 16 slot bays. Supports up to 16 10 Gigabit Ethernet ports / 160 Gigabit Ethernet Ports / 160 SFPs.

=== Distribution/Aggregator ===
- 6200yl - Stackable switch, Layer 3, with 24 SFP transceiver ports, and the capability of 10GE ports
- 6400cl series - Stackable switch, Layer 3, with either CX4 10GE ports or X2 10GE ports
- 6108 - Stackable switch, with 6 Gigabit ports, and a further 2 Dual Personality Gigabit ports (either 1000BASE-T or SFPs)

=== Managed edge switches ===
Legend:
Unsupported
Latest version

==== Entry level ====
2530, 2620 and 2540 lines are Aruba/HPE branded and included for comparison purposes only

Property	2500	2510	2520	2530	2600	2610	2620	2540
Status	Discontinued			Current	Discontinued			Current
Released	2000	August 2006	November 2009	December 2012	2002	March 2008	September 2011	November 2016
Layer	Layer 2				Layer 3 (lite)	Layer 3 (lite) static routing	Layer 3 (lite) static & RIP routing	
Ports	12 or 24 10/100 ports with 2 proprietary Gb transceiver slots.	24 (fanless) or 48 (incl. fan) 10/100 ports including 2 Dual Personality Ports (Gb or SFPs). G models: 20 or 44 Gb ports with 4 Dual Personality Ports (4 x Gb or SFPs).	8 or 24 (PoE or non-PoE). GB and non-GB		8, 24 or 48 10/100 ports including 1 or 2 Dual Personality Ports (1 or 2 x Gb or SFPs).	24 or 48 (10/100 with 2 Gb ports and 2 SFP ports (no Dual Personality)	24 or 48 (PoE and non-PoE) with 2 SFP ports	24 or 48 (PoE and non-PoE) with 4 SFP+ ports
CPU	ARM7TDMI @62.5 Mhz	MIPS 32 @264/300 MHz	Freescale PowerPC 8313 @266 MHz	ARM9E @800 Mhz	Motorola PowerPC MPC8245 @266 MHz	MIPS @300 MHz	Power PC FreeScale 8313 @400 MHz	Dual Core ARM Coretex A9 @1016 MHz
Memory	26MB	64MB (128 MB 2510–48)	128MB DDR2	256MB DDR3	32MB	128MB	512MB	1024 MB DDR3 SDRAM
Packet buffer	6MB	385KB (24), 768 KB (24G); 512 KB (48), 1.5 MB (48G)	384KB (512 KB on GB models)	1.5MB (8,24), 3 MB(48)	?	1MB (24), 2 MB (48)	1MB (24), 2 MB (48)	12.38 MB
Last sold	February 2010	February 2014		Current	February 2009	May 2012	October 2018	Current
Spec ref								

==== Mainstream ====
2920 line is Aruba/HPE branded and included for comparison purposes only

Property	2800	2810	2900	2910al	2920	3400cl	3500	3500yl
Status	Discontinued							
Released	2004	2006	2006	2009	2013	2004		February 2007
Layer	Layer 3 (lite)	Layer 3 (lite) static routing	Layer 3 (lite) static & RIP routing	Layer 3				
Ports	20 or 44 Gb ports with 4 Dual Personality Ports (4 x Gb or SFPs).	20 or 44 Gb ports with 4 Dual Personality Ports (4 x Gb or SFPs)	20 or 44 Gb ports with 4 Dual Personality Ports (2 x Gb or SFPs); Additionally includes four 10GE ports (two CX-4 and two capable of housing optional 10GE optical transceivers).	20 or 44 Gb ports with 4 Dual Personality Ports (4 x Gbor SFPs); Supports up to four optional 10 Gigabit ports in CX4 and / or SFP+. Two versions support PoE and PoE+		20 or 44 Gb port switch, and 4 x Dual Personality Ports (2 x Gb or SFPs). Also capable of supporting 10GE ports.	20 or 44 10/100 port switches with two models supportingPoE functionality, and 4 x Dual Personality Ports (2 x Gb or SFPs).	20 or 44 Gb port switch with PoE functionality, and 4 x Dual Personality Ports (2 x Gb or SFPs). Also capable of supporting 10GE ports.
CPU	Motorola PowerPC MPC8245 @266 MHz	MIPS @264 MHz	Freescale PowerPC 8540 @667 MHz	Dual ARM1156T2S @515 MHz	Tri Core ARM1176 @625 MHz	266Mhz	Freescale PowerPC 8540 @666 MHz	
Memory	64MB	64MB	?	515MB	512MB	128MB	256MB	
Packet buffer	?	768KB (24G), 1.5 MB (48G)	13.5MB (24G), 22.5 MB (48G)	6MB	11.25MB	2MB		
Last sold	December 2009	August 2013	October 2009	May 2014	March 2018 (August 2018 PoE)	March 2009	June 2014	
Spec ref								

==== Chassis/Advanced ====
Series	Status	Released	Layer	Sizes	Comments
5400zl	Discontinued June 2018	2006	Layer 3	6 or 12 slot bays. Supports up to 48 10GE ports, 288 GbE ports, or 288 SFPs	Powered by a combination of either 875W or 1500W PSU's, to provide a maximum of 3600W (5400W using additional power supplies) of power for PoE
4200vl	Discontinued July 2015	2006	Layer 3	4 or 8 slot bays. Supports up to 192 10/100 or GbE ports with up to 32 SFP ports, or 8 10GE ports (X2)	static IPv4 routing, optionally redundant power

=== Web managed switches ===
- 1800 series - Fanless 8 or 24 Gb ports. The 1800-24G also has 2 Dual Personality Ports (2 x Gb or SFP). No CLI or SNMP management.
- 1700 series - Fanless 7 10/100 ports plus 1 Gb or 22 10/100 ports plus 2 Gb. The 1700-24 also has 2 Dual Personality Ports (2 x Gb or SFPs). No CLI or SNMP management.

=== Unmanaged switches ===
- 2300 series
- 2124
- 1400 series
- 408

== Routing ==
=== WAN Routers ===
- 7000dl - Stackable WAN routers with modules for T1/E1, E1+G.703, ADSL2+, Serial, ISDN, and also IPsec VPN.

German company .vantronix marketed software products until 2009.

== Mobility ==
Due to country laws, ProCurve released different versions of their wireless access points and MultiService Access points.

=== MultiService Mobility / Access Controllers ===
The MSM Access and Mobility Controllers support security, roaming and quality of service across MSM Access Points utilising 802.11 a/b/g/n/ac wireless technology.

- MSM710 - Supports up to 10 x MSM Access points. Supports up to 100 Guest Users.
- MSM730 - Supports up to 40 x MSM Access points. Supports up to 500 Guest Users.
- MSM750 - Supports up to 200 x MSM Access points. Supports up to 2000 Guest Users.
- MSM760 - Supports 40 x MSM Access Points, plus license support up to 200
- MSM765 - Supports 40 x MSM Access Points, plus license support up to 200. This is a module form, and based on the ProCurve ONE.

=== MultiService Access Points ===
Most access points are designed to work in controlled mode: a controller manages and provides authentication services for them.

- MSM310 - Single 802.11a/b/g radio. Includes 2.4 GHz dipole antennas
- MSM310-R - External use. Single 802.11a/b/g radio. Includes 2.4 GHz dipole antennas
- MSM313 - Integrated MSM Controller + single radio Access Point
- MSM313-R - External Use. Integrated MSM Controller + single radio Access Point
- MSM317 - Single 802.11b/g radio, with integrated 4 port switch
- MSM320 - Dual radios (802.11a/b/g + 802.11a/b/g) for outdoor deployment options. Includes 2.4 GHz dipole antennas. Supports PoE.
- MSM320-R - External use. Dual radios (802.11a/b/g + 802.11a/b/g). Includes 2.4 GHz dipole antennas. Supports PoE.
- MSM323 - Integrated MSM Controller + dual radio Access point.
- MSM323-R - External Use. Integrated MSM Controller + dual radio Access point.
- MSM325 - Dual radios (802.11a/b/g + 802.11a/b/g) including RF security sensor. Requires PoE
- MSM335 - Triple radios (802.11a/b/g + 802.11a/b/g + 802.11a/b/g RF security sensor)
- MSM410 - Single 802.11 a/b/g/n radio. Requires PoE. Internal antenna only.
- MSM422 - Dual-radio 802.11n + 802.11a/b/g.
- MSM460 - Dual-Radio 802.11a/b/g/n. Only internal 3x3 MIMO Antenna. Requires PoE.
- MSM466 - Same as MSM460 but with external 3x3 MIMO antenna connectors, no internal antenna. Requires PoE.

=== Centralised wireless ===
- Wireless Edge Services Module - Controls Radio ports, and is an integrated module that fits into ProCurve Switches 5300xl / 5400zl / 8200zl only. Redundant Module available for failover. Supports the following Radio Ports:
- RP-210 - Single 802.11b/g radio and integrated antenna
- RP-220 - Dual-radio design (one 802.11a and one 802.11b/g); plenum rated; external antennas required
- RP-230 - Dual-radio design (one 802.11a and one 802.11b/g); features internal, integrated antennas

=== Wireless access points ===
- M110 - Single 802.11a/b/g radio
- M111 - Wireless Client Bridge including dual band antennas
- AP-530 - Wireless access point; Dual radios support simultaneous 802.11a and 802.11b/g transmissions. The AP-530 has two integrated radios (one of which supports 802.11a/b/g; the other of which supports 802.11b/g). The AP supports the Wireless Distribution System.
- AP-420 - Wireless access point; Features a single, dual-diversity 802.11b/g radio.
- AP-10ag - Wireless access point; Dual radios support simultaneous 802.11a and 802.11b/g transmissions.

== Management Software ==
ProCurve Manager (PCM) is a network management suite for products by ProCurve.

=== ProCurve Manager ===
ProCurve Manager comes in two versions; a base version supplied both free of charge with all managed ProCurve Products and also for download, and a "Plus" version that incorporates more advanced functionality and also enables plugin support. There is a 60-day trial version including all modules. Both derive from the trial version and need to be activated via Internet.

The Plus version can also be implemented in HP OpenView Network Node Manager for Windows. The software ProCurve Manager is predominantly for ProCurve products.

=== Protocols ===
- PCM uses Link Layer Discovery Protocol (LLDP, Cisco Discovery Protocol (CDP) and FDP (Foundry) for detecting network devices
- For identification and deep inspection of network devices SNMP V2c or V3 is used.
- Network traffic is analysed using RMON and sFlow.

=== Plugins ===
- IDM (Identity Driven Manager) - Add-on Module for PCM+; contains Intranet Network Access Security using 802.1X; compatible with MicrosoftNetwork Access Protection (NAP) since Version IDM V2.3
- NIM (Network Immunity Manager) - Add-On Module for PCM+ v2.2 and above; contains Intranet Intrusion Detection and Network Behavior Anomaly Detection (NBAD) using sFlow
- PMM (ProCurve Mobility Manager) - Add-on Module for PCM+; contains Element Management for ProCurve Access Points (420/520/530) starting from Version PMM V1; WESM Modules and Radio Ports are supported since Version PMM V2. Since PMM v3, the MSM Access Points and Controllers are now supported

== Security ==
=== Network access control with endpoint testing ===
- ProCurve Network Access Controller 800 - Management and security for endpoints when they access the network

=== Firewall ===
The Threat Management Services Module is based on the ProCurve ONE Module, and is primarily a firewall with additional Intrusion-prevention system and VPN capabilities

== Accessories ==
=== External power supplies ===
- ProCurve 600 Redundant external power supply - supports one of six times Redundant Power for series 2600-PWR (not series 2600 w/o PWR), 2610, 2800, 3400cl, 6400cl and 7000dl as well as two times optional External PoE Power for series 2600-PWR, 2610-PWR or mandatory External PoE Power for series 5300 with xl 24-Port 10/100-TX PoE Module only
- ProCurve 610 External power supply - supports four times optional External PoE Power for series 2600-PWR, 2610-PWR, or mandatory External PoE Power for series 5300 with xl 24-Port 10/100-TX PoE Module only
- ProCurve 620 Redundant/External power supply - supports two times optional External PoE Power for series 3500yl and two times Redundant Power for series 2900, 3500yl and 6200yl
- ProCurve Switch zl power supply shelf - supports two times optional External PoE Power for series 5400zl and 8200zl; must be additionally equipped with max. two 875W or 1500W (typical) ProCurve Switch zl power supplies

=== GBICs and optics ===
ProCurve have a range of Transceivers, GBICs and 10GbE optics for use within ProCurve devices.

Transceivers are used in the unmanaged 2100 & 2300 series, and the managed 2500 series of switches

Type	Cable Type	Maximum Distance	Notes
Gigabit Stacking Kit	Interconnect Cable	59 cm	2 x HSSDC Gigabit Transceiver ports.
Gigabit SX Transceiver	Multimode	up to 550 m	1000BASE-SX, -SC port.
Gigabit LX Transceiver	Singlemode or Multimode	10 km or 550 m	1000BASE-LX, -SC port.
100/1000-T Transceiver	Category 5 cable plus	100 m	RJ-45 port.
100-FX Transceiver	Multimode	2 km full duplex or 412 m half duplex	100BASE-FX port.

GBICs are used for most switches for 100 Mbit/s and 1000 Mbit/s fiber connectivity. All fiber GBICs have an LC presentation.

Type	Cable Type	Maximum Distance	Notes
100BASE-FX	Multimode	2 km full duplex or 412 m half duplex	
100BASE-BX10-D	Singlemode	up to 10 km	
100BASE-BX10-U	Singlemode	up to 10 km	
1000BASE-SX	Multimode	up to 550 m	Dependent on fiber cable quality
1000BASE-LX	Multimode	2 to 550 m	
1000BASE-LX	Singlemode	2 to 10,000 m	Compliant with IEEE 1000BASE-LX10 standard
1000BASE-LH	Singlemode	10 to 70,000 m	Attentuators may be required dependent on distance.
1000BASE-BX-D	Singlemode	0.5 to 10,000 m	
1000BASE-BX-U	Singlemode	0.5 to 10,000 m	
1000BASE-T Transceiver	Cat 5 cable plus	100 m	

== ProCurve ONE ==
=== HP ProCurve ONE Services zl Module ===
The HP ProCurve ONE Services zl Module is an x86-based server module that provides two 10-GbE network links into the switch backplane. Coupled with ProCurve-certified services and applications that can take advantage of the switch-targeted API for better performance, this module creates a virtual appliance within a switch slot to provide solutions for business needs, such as network security. The ProCurve ONE Services zl Module is supported in the following switches:

- HP ProCurve Switch 5406zl
- HP ProCurve Switch 5412zl
- HP ProCurve Switch 8212zl

The following applications have completed, or will complete the ProCurve ONE Integrated certification on the HP ProCurve Services zl Module in early 2009.

Data center automation

- HP ProCurve Data Center Connection Manager ONE Software (Q3 2009)

Location

- Ekahau Real Time Location System

Wireless IPS

- AirTight Networks SpectraGuard Enterprise

Network management

- InMon Corporation Traffic Sentinel

VoIP / Unified Communications

- Aastra 5000 Next Generation IP telephony
- Avaya Unified Communications Solutions

Video distribution

- VBrick Systems ViP

Other - Unsupported

Other 'unofficial' methods for loading alternative platform software such as pfSense and VMware's ESXi on to ONE Service modules have been discovered.

HP ZL Compute Blade on the Cheap | Tinkeringdadblog

== Discontinued Products ==
- 1600M - stackable Layer 2 switch
- 2400M - stackable Layer 2 switch
- 2424M - stackable Layer 2 switch
- 4000M - modular Layer 2 switch
- 8000M - modular Layer 2 switch
- 9400 - modular Layer 3 Router
- AP 520 - Access Point
- 4100gl - modular Layer 2 switch
- 2700 series - unmanaged Layer 2 switch
- 9300m series - modular Layer 3 Router
- ProCurve Access Controller Series 700wl
- 745wl
- ACM (Access Control Module) for the 5300xl only
- 5300xl series - Chassis based, Layer 3, in either 4 or 8 slot bays.

== See also ==
- Aruba Networks
- ProCurve
