= Subhasish Mitra =

Electrical Engineer, Computer Scientist

Subhasish Mita
- Education: Jadavpur University; Stanford University; IIT Kharagpur
- Scientific career
- Fields: Computer Scientist and Electrical Engineer
- Workplaces: Intel, Stanford University
- Thesis: Diversity Techniques for Concurrent Error Detection (2000)
- Doctoral advisor: Edward J. McCluskey
- Doctoral students: Max Shulaker (MIT)

Subhasish Mitra is an American Computer Science and Electrical Engineering professor at Stanford University. He directs the Stanford Robust Systems Group, leads the Computation Focus Area of the Stanford SystemX Alliance, and is a member of the Wu Tsai Neurosciences Institute. His research ranges across Robust Computing, NanoSystems, Electronic Design Automation (EDA), and Neurosciences. He teaches EE 108 - digital systems design at Stanford.

Mitra holds the William E. Ayer Professorship in Electrical Engineering.

== Education ==
Subhasish Mitra obtained his Ph.D. degree in Electrical Engineering from Stanford University in 2000 under Edward J. McCluskey. Mitra received his Master of Technology (M.Tech.) degree in Computer Science from the IIT Kharagpur in 1996, where he was the silver medal recipient for the highest rank among all M.Tech. students. From 1994 to 1996, he held a Cadence Fellowship at IIT Kharagpur. He earned his undergraduate degree from the Department of Computer Science and Engineering, Jadavpur University in 1994, receiving gold medals for ranking first in engineering during all four years of study.

== Awards and distinctions ==
- Intel Achievement Award, Intel’s highest corporate honor, was awarded to Mitra in 2004 “for the development and deployment of a breakthrough test compression technology that improved scan test cost by an order of magnitude”.
- Presidential Early Career Award for Scientists and Engineers (PECASE) from the White House, given to Mitra via National Science Foundation in 2008 as "the highest honor bestowed by the United States government on outstanding scientists and engineers beginning their independent careers".
- Fellow of the Institute of Electrical and Electronics Engineers (IEEE), 2013 for contributions to design and test of robust integrated circuits.
- ACM Fellow, 2014.
- Association for Computing Machinery (ACM) Special Interest Group on Design Automation (SIGDA)/IEEE CEDA A. Richard Newton Technical Impact Award in Electronic Design Automation was given to Mitra in 2014 "for a major breakthrough in test response compaction that is key to cost-effective manufacturing of high-quality electronic systems."
- Humboldt Research Award (Humboldt Prize), Alexander von Humboldt Foundation, Germany, 2019. The award is given “In recognition of a researcher's entire achievements to date to academics whose fundamental discoveries, new theories, or insights have had a significant impact on their own discipline and who are expected to continue producing cutting-edge achievements in the future.”
- The Semiconductor Industry Association (SIA) and the Semiconductor Research Corporation (SRC) recognized Mitra's lifetime research contributions to the U.S. semiconductor industry in 2021 by a University Research Award.
- IEEE Computer Society Harry H. Goode Memorial Award, 2022, “for sustained contributions to design and test of computing systems in established and emerging technologies.”
- Stanford Terman award, 2020–2021.
- International Member of Academia Europaea.
- EDAA Achievement Award, 2025.
