= Jacob Abraham =

American computer scientist and engineer

Jacob A. Abraham is an American computer scientist and engineer who is a professor emeritus and currently the Cockrell Family Regents Chair in the Department of Electrical and Computer Engineering at the University of Texas at Austin. He is a Fellow of the Institute of Electrical and Electronics Engineers and the Association for Computing Machinery.

== Early life and education ==
He was born in Kerala, India on December 8, 1948. He received a bachelor's degree in electrical engineering from the University of Kerala in 1970. He received an M.S. degree, also in electrical engineering, and Ph.D., in electrical engineering and computer science, from Stanford University in 1971 and 1974 respectively. His PhD advisor was Edward J. McCluskey.

== Scholarly Contributions ==
He was at University of Illinois at Urbana-Champaign during 1975 - 1988. He has been at University of Texas at Austin since 1988. His research interests include VLSI design and test, formal verification, and fault-tolerant computing. He has supervised more than 60 Ph.D. students. His former students include W. Kent Fuchs, Prithviraj Banerjee and Kaushik Roy. He has served as an associate editor of several IEEE Transactions, and as a chair of the IEEE Computer Society Technical Committee on Fault-Tolerant Computing.

== Awards and recognition ==
Abraham is a recipient of numerous awards including the IEEE Emanuel R. Piore Award, the Jean-Claude Laprie Award, and the IEEE TTTC Lifetime Contribution Medal. He also was a fellow of both IEEE and ACM.
