= Hewlett Packard Labs =

Research division of Hewlett Packard Enterprise

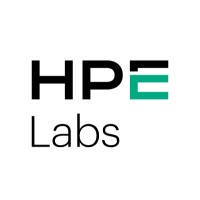
- Predecessor: HP Labs
- Formation: 1 November 2015
- Type: Research organization
- Headquarters: Houston, Texas
- CTO: Fidelma Russo
- VP and director: Andrew Wheeler
- Parent organization: Hewlett Packard Enterprise
- Website: www.labs.hpe.com

HPE Labs (formerly called Hewlett Packard Labs) is the exploratory and advanced research group for Hewlett Packard Enterprise and its businesses. It was formed in November, 2015 when HP Labs spun off Hewlett Packard Labs to reflect the spin off of Hewlett Packard Enterprise from HP Inc. (formerly Hewlett-Packard). The lab is located in Houston, Texas.

== History ==
HP Labs was established on March 3, 1966, by founders Bill Hewlett and David Packard, seeking to create an organization not bound by day-to-day business concerns. In August 2007, HP executives drastically diminished the number of projects, down from 150 to 30. On November 1, 2015, HP Labs spun off Hewlett Packard Labs into a separate organization managed by Hewlett Packard Enterprise with Martin Fink becoming the director.

In 2014, CTO Martin Fink Labs announced a computer architecture research project called The Machine. The project focused on a "memory-centric" computer based on a pool of non-volatile memristor memory connected to special purpose cores using a photonics interconnect. An early prototype was produced in 2016 consisting of 320TB of NUMA DRAM memory, dozens of off the shelf processors and a Gen-Z based interconnect. Since then, HPE has been working on bringing various aspects to their product lines.

== Directors ==
The following have served as Director of HPE Labs, Hewlett Packard Labs and HP Labs since the foundation of HP Labs in 1966.

- Barney Oliver (1966–81)
- John Doyle (1981–84)
- Joel Birnbaum (1984–86 and 1991–99)
- Don Hammond (1986–87)
- Frank Carrubba (1987–91)
- Ed Karrer (1999)
- Dick Lampman (1999–2007)
- Prith Banerjee (2007–2012)
- Chandrakant Patel (interim; April 7, 2012 – Nov 2012)
- Martin Fink (2012–2016)
- Mark Potter (2016–2020)
- Andrew Wheeler (2020-Present)
