= Steve Simske =

American engineer and scientist

- Born: 1964 (age 61–62); San Diego, United States
- Education: BS Marquette University, MS Rensselaer Polytechnic Institute, Ph.D. University of Colorado
- Known for: Intelligent systems, text analytics, variable data printing, biomedical engineering
- Scientific career
- Workplaces: Colorado State University
- Website: https://www.engr.colostate.edu/se/steve-simske/

Steve Simske (born 1964 in San Diego, United States), also known as Steven J. Simske, is an American engineer and scientist specialized in biomedical engineering, cybersecurity, anti-counterfeiting, Variable data printing, imaging, and robotics. He is a full professor of systems engineering at the Walter Scott Jr. School of Engineering of Colorado State University.

== Education and career ==
Simske received a B.S. in. Bioengineering and Biomedical Engineering from Marquette University in 1986, and a M.S. also in bioengineering from Rensselaer Polytechnic Institute in 1987. He then received in 1990 a Ph.D. in Electrical Engineering from the University of Colorado in Boulder. This was followed by two post docs from the same university, one in electrical and computer engineering in 1991 and one in aerospace engineering in 1993.

Simske was research professor at the University of Colorado from 1994 to 2007. He joined HP in 1994, then HP Labs in 2000, where he was a director in printing and imaging lab from 2004 to 2018. He was named a HP fellow in 2011.

Simske is an IEEE Fellow for contributions to anti-counterfeiting and cyber-physical security. He is an Honorary Professor of the University of Nottingham, and a 2015 recipient of the Robert F. Reed Award. He is a fellow of the Society for Imaging Science and Technology, and was its president from 2017 to 2019. He is chair of the steering committee for the ACM DocEng Symposium. He is a fellow of the National Academy of Inventors.

== Books ==
- Simske, Steve, Meta-Algorithmics: Patterns for Robust, Low Cost, High Quality Systems, Wiley-IEEE Press, 2013. ISBN 978111862669-6
- Simske, Steve. Meta-Analytics: Consensus Approaches and System Patterns for Data Analysis. Elsevier, 2018. ISBN 9780128146231
- Mayer, Joceli; Borges, Paulo, and Simske, Steve. Fundamentals and Applications of Hardcopy Communication: Conveying Side Information by Printed Media. Springer, 2018. ISBN 9783319740829
- Simske, Steve and Vans, Marie. Functional Applications of Text Analytics Systems. River Publishers Series in Document Engineering, 2021. ISBN 9788770223430
- Ewing, Jeffrey, and Simske, Steven. Engineering of Music for the Digital Age: Creativity in Musical Composition. CRC Press, 2024. ISBN 9788770041072

== See also ==
- List of prolific inventors
