= Joel S. Birnbaum =

American computer scientist (born 1937)

- Education: Cornell University; Yale University
- Awards: IEEE Ernst Weber Engineering Leadership Recognition
- Scientific career
- Workplaces: Thomas J. Watson Research Center; HP Labs
- Thesis: Studies of Nuclear Transfer Reactions at High Energy (1966)
- Doctoral advisor: D. Allan Bromley

Joel Samuel Birnbaum (born December 20, 1937) is a technology executive who served as senior vice president of Hewlett-Packard.

Birnbaum earned a bachelor's degree in engineering physics from Cornell University, and a doctorate in nuclear physics from Yale University in 1966. He worked at the IBM Thomas J. Watson Research Center from 1965 to 1980, eventually becoming director of computer sciences there. From 1980 until his retirement he worked for Hewlett-Packard, where he directed the Computer Research Center of HP Labs. In 1984 he was promoted to vice president at HP and director of HP Labs. He became a senior vice president in 1991.

Birnbaum was elected to the National Academy of Engineering in 1989 for scientific and management contributions to advanced computer architectures.

He won the IEEE Ernst Weber Engineering Leadership Recognition Award in 2000 "for leadership in integrating, extending and shaping industrial research and development in measurement, computing and communications".

In 2001 he became a Fellow of the Association for Computing Machinery. He is also a Fellow of the American Academy of Arts and Sciences, the Royal Academy of Engineering, and the Institute of Electrical and Electronics Engineers.
