= HPE Networking =

Networking division of Hewlett Packard Enterprise

Hewlett Packard Enterprise Networking (abbreviated as HPE Networking) is the Networking Products division of Hewlett Packard Enterprise ("HPE"). HPE Networking and its predecessor entities have developed and sold networking products since 1979. Currently, it offers networking and switching products for small and medium sized businesses through its wholly owned subsidiary Aruba Networks. Prior to 2015, the entity within HP which offered networking products was called HP Networking.

== History ==
HP's networking division was previously known as HP ProCurve. The HP division that became the HP ProCurve division began in Roseville, CA, in 1979. Originally it was part of HP’s Data Systems Division (DSD) and known as DSD-Roseville. Later, it was called the Roseville Networks Division (RND), then the Workgroup Networks Division (WND), before becoming the ProCurve Networking Business (PNB). The trademark filing date for the ProCurve name was February 25, 1998.

On August 11, 2008, HP announced the acquisition of Colubris Networks, manufacturer of Wireless capabilities, such as 802.11n. This completed on October 1, 2008.

On November 11, 2009, HP announced its intent to acquire 3Com Corporation for $2.7B. In April 2010, HP completed its acquisition.

In April 2010, following HP's acquisition of 3Com Corporation, HP combined the ProCurve and 3Com entities as HP Networking.

- HP ProCurve. Based in Roseville, CA, USA. Developer of networking switches and wireless services. Global sales.
- The acquired 3Com Corporation. Based in Marlborough, MA, USA. Global sales outside of China.
- The 3Com division H3C Technologies Co., Ltd. Based in Hangzhou, China. Developer of networking switches, routers, telephony and wireless services. Sales within China.
- The 3Com division TippingPoint. Based in Austin, Texas. Developer of networking security services, particularly intrusion prevention systems. Global sales.

In May 2015, UNIS acquired a 51% stake in H3C for $2.3 billion.

On May 19, 2015, HP completed the acquisition of Aruba Networks and subsequently moved all its networking business into the Aruba Networking entity.

In January 2024, Juniper Networks agreed to be acquired in full by Hewlett Packard Enterprise (HPE) for approximately $14 billion. The acquisition closed on July 2, 2025.

In May 2024, Hewlett Packard Enterprise announced that UNIS would acquire a further 30% stake in H3C for $2.1 billion.

== Past networking initiatives and technologies ==
=== Network architecture ===
Network architecture encompasses the entire framework of an organization's computer network, including hardware components that are used for communication, network layout and topologies, physical and Wireless connections, and cabling and device types, as well as software rules and protocols. The core and aggregation layers of a traditional three-tier, hierarchical model provide built-in redundancy, but this design can be inefficient for virtualized environments. The flat layout of the HP FlexNetwork Architecture is designed to provide more agility to the network and to support functionality such as virtualization, convergence, and automation.

HP FlexNetwork Architecture unites an organization's networks in the data center, campus, and branch offices through a cost-efficient, consistent architecture, according to published reports. Four product groups make up the architecture: FlexFabric, for data centers with physical and virtual environments composed of converged computing, storage, and networking resources; FlexCampus, for converged wired and wireless networks; FlexBranch, for providing branch offices with networking and security; and Flex Management, which provides one unified management interface for the entire FlexNetwork and includes the HP Intelligent Management Center (IMC).

The HP Intelligent Resilient Framework (IRF) software virtualization technology is designed to provide rapid recovery from failure to the FlexNetwork, and to improve vMotion performance in VMware environments.

=== Software-defined networking ===
The focus by enterprise data center networking technologies on virtualization has caused organizations' networks to become more automated and simplified. Several factors are driving these changes: the recognition by IT that network operations can be aligned with an organization's business goals; the request from an organization's leaders for the data center to respond rapidly to variations in demand; changes in application network traffic patterns; and changes in size and density of the data center, due to some services being offloaded to cloud computing resources, greater compute density, and an increased use of virtual technology. In turn, these changes have led to an increased demand for software-defined networking (SDN)technology from organizations.

In 2007, HP collaborated with Stanford University to develop Ethane, an early version of the open-source standard OpenFlow upon which SDN is based. HP is a founding member of the nonprofit Open Networking Foundation. Organized in March 2011, the foundation provides support for SDN and manages the OpenFlow standard.

HP is also a founding member of the Open Daylight Project, which was announced on April 8, 2013, by the Linux Foundation as an industry-supported collaboration to further the open development of SDN and Network Functions Virtualization. Other founding members include Arista Networks, Big Switch Networks, Brocade, Cisco, Citrix, Ericsson, IBM, Juniper Networks, Microsoft, NEC, Nuage Networks, PLUMgrid, Red Hat, and VMware.

Because OpenFlow is based on open standards, there is little risk of vendor lock-in when using OpenFlow-enabled products. It is claimed that networks using SDN will result in a more efficient and reliable data center infrastructure. An SDN controller serves as the core of an SDN network, managing flow controls based on protocols such as OpenFlow, and relaying communications between applications and network devices. In 2012, HP introduced the Virtual Application Networks (VAN) SDN OpenFlow controller, which is available in a software format. The HP SDN Manager application is intended to allow administrators to configure, monitor, and manage policies for SDN switches and controllers.

In 2013, HP introduced its SDN Developer Kit and announced the SDN App Store, as well as integration with VMware NSX. The SDN App Store can be used to browse, search, purchase, and download SDN applications onto the HP VAN SDN Controller. HP certifies that applications offered in the SDN App Store will function reliably on HP network infrastructure. New HP network applications will be run on or integrated with the HP VAN SDN Controller and made available through the SDN App Store.

In 2014, HP was producing more than 50 models of OpenFlow-enabled switches, including the FlexFabric 7900 switch series, which is optimized for SDN deployment. The FlexFabric 12900 switch series, also optimized for SDN deployment, was awarded SearchNetworking's Network Innovation Award in December 2013.

The HP Virtual Cloud Networking (VCN) SDN Application is designed to provide virtual network overlays to the OpenStack technology open source cloud computing software, serving as a bridge between the HP Helion OpenStack cloud computing platform and the HP VAN SDN controller. According to published reports, the HP VCN SDN Application will help organizations transition from legacy networks to the cloud.

=== Mobility/BYOD/WLAN ===
Mobility/bring your own device (BYOD) refers to the practice of employees using their privately owned mobile devices such as laptops, tablet computers, and smartphones for work purposes. This practice allows employees to perform work functions from these devices both in the office and remotely, increasing working satisfaction and boosting productivity, according to a study by IBM. Wired and wireless network technologies enable organizations to provide connectivity for these mobile devices throughout an office space.

To provide wired and wireless access, legacy IT infrastructure requires two individual networks, each with its own management applications. HP provides a unified BYOD service that includes an SDN security application, which provides real-time threat detection and simplifies operations, reducing costs by up to 38 percent, according to published reports.

The HP IMC Smart Connect includes integrated mobile network–access control to manage enterprise access to mobile devices. To help administrators oversee the use of mobile devices on enterprise networks, HP has integrated into IMC support for the Citrix XenMobile and MobileIron mobile device management applications.

In March 2014, HP renamed its SDN BYOD security application from Sentinel to Network Protector. HP Network Protector sits on top of the HP SDN VAN Controller.

When employees use mobile devices to download files or stream rich media applications such as video, the network traffic can consume much of the bandwidth on the company’s core network. One way to reduce the impact of this increased traffic is to create a separate guest network for mobile devices that is completely segregated from the corporate network, and to set network access control (NAC) policies that limit access to certain sites.

In addition to the VAN SDN controller, HP provides a number of SDN products that can help reduce the occurrence of a network bottleneck and enable mobile voice over Internet Protocol (VoIP), video, and other rich media apps. HP offers a pay-per-use cloud service model designed for small and mid-sized businesses and distributed offices. The HP Cloud Managed Network Wireless LAN service is designed to enable organizations to manage wireless infrastructure without having to have an on-premises controller. The HP Cloud Managed Network Wireless LAN works only with HP 300 series Cloud-Managed access points, which provide cloud management capabilities for distributed organizations. In the event of a loss of connectivity to a cloud management service, the access points can keep a local wireless network up and running, allowing businesses to continue to operate.

The HP 870 Unified Wired-WLAN Appliance is designed to help administrators bridge the gap between wired and wireless networks. According to published reports, the appliance simplifies management and access and supports up to 30,000 communication endpoints. The HP 850 Unified Wired-WLAN Appliance supports up to 10,000 endpoints.

=== Network virtualization ===
Network virtualization involves the process of combining available resources in a network by dividing available bandwidth into independent channels that can be dynamically assigned to a specified device or server. The hardware and software network functionality and resources can be merged into one software-based administrative entity. Network virtualization enables the automation of many network management tasks, and allows the network administrator to centrally manage files, images, programs, and folders from a single physical site. The technology is designed to make networks faster and more flexible, scalable, and reliable.

Virtualization enables administrators to run multiple operating systems and multiple applications simultaneously on one server. It is the technology that underlies cloud computing.

At HP Discover in June 2014, HP announced the Virtual Cloud Networking (VCN) SDN Application, which provides a multitenant network virtualization service for KVM and VMware ESX multi-hypervisor data center applications. Expected in fall 2014, the initial version is an enhanced OpenStack-technology module in HP Helion OpenStack. Centrally orchestrated virtual LAN (VLAN) or VXLAN-based virtual networks provide multitenant isolation.

The HP VAN Resource Automation Manager is designed to increase the speed at which network services are rolled out by improving service deployment and provisioning accuracy, providing policy-driven resource management from access to core, according to published reports. The HP IRF software virtualization technology is intended to allow administrators to connect multiple devices through physical IRF ports, configure the devices, and then virtualize those devices into a distributed device. According to published reports, IRF simplifies switch configuration and management, providing horizontal scaling that reduces network hops and delivering support for technology such as Shortest Path Bridging (SPB) and transparent interconnection of lots of links (TRILL).

=== Unified communications ===
Unified communications (UC) products integrate multiple interactive, real-time enterprise communication methods, such as instant messaging, desktop sharing, and telephony with non-real-time communication services such as unified messaging (integrated voicemail, e-mail, SMS, and fax). UC products can enable administrators to control and manage these methods. The HP Network Optimizer SDN Application for Microsoft Lync functions as a unified communications-and-collaboration (UC&C) application that is designed to improve voice quality with Lync; in March 2014 it received a NetEvents Cloud Innovation award in the category of SDN Solution for the Enterprise.

=== Networking professional services ===
Companies engage networking professional services to help them plan how to build networks that support their business needs. HP Trusted Network Transformation is designed to help organizations that want to use private cloud. These networking professional services include workshops, consultation, network assessment, and architectural design services involving network virtualization and SDN.

== Product and technology highlights ==
Hewlett Packard Enterprise through Aruba Networks sells a range of products for businesses, schools, and government entities.

=== Products ===
- Switches: HP offers a range of networking switch series for various locations and configurations: data center core, data center access, HP BladeSystem blade switch, campus LAN core/distribution, and campus/branch LAN access, as well as small business—smart web managed and small business—unmanaged.
- Network security: HP security modules and appliances include intrusion prevention systems, traditional firewalls, centralized module and appliance management, centralized network access management, and centralized threat management. HP also provides security research, delivered as actionable security intelligence.
- Network management: The HP Intelligent Management Center provides network monitoring and configuration management functions for a heterogeneous network.
- Wireless LAN (WLAN): HP provides several different series of unified wired-WLAN enterprise switches, 802.11ac and 802.11n enterprise access points, Unified Wired-WLAN Modules and stand-alone Wireless Controller series, WLAN client bridges, Unified Walljacks, wireless adaptors, WLAN security, and an RF planning tool.
- Routers: HP routers include series of products for branch locations (fixed port, modular, and virtual), campus (modular), and data center (modular).
- Transceivers and accessories: Transceivers include series for SFP 1G/100M, SFP+ 10G, X2 10G, XFP 10G, and GBIC. Cables include CAT 5e, CX4, direct attach copper, and fiber optic. Miscellaneous adapters, external power supplies, interconnect kits, and rack-mounting kits are also available.

=== Technologies ===
- Bring your own device (BYOD): The HP BYOD service provides a secure way for users to access an organization's network and applications from mobile devices such as laptops, tablets, and smartphones. It includes a number of switch series for unified wired and wireless networks, as well as these BYOD HP products: IMC User Access Manager, IMC Endpoint Admission Defense, Intelligent Management Center (IMC) Standard Software, IMC Smart Connect WLAN, IMC Smart Connect, and IMC Wireless Services Manager.
- Dynamic Virtual Private Network (DVPN): The HP DVPN service interconnects data centers, campuses, and branch offices with standards-based IPsec VPN encryption. It includes HP 6600 router series, HP MSR series routers, and Intelligent Management Center.
- Software-defined networking: HP software-defined networking products are designed to provide an end-to-end service to automate the network from data center to campus and branch. The SDN Ecosystem includes the HP Network Protector SDN Application and the HP Network Optimizer Application for Microsoft Lync, as well as SDN-related products from third-party developers that integrate with HP SDN products. The HP SDN Dev Center provides resources for developers to produce applications for HP SDN products; it includes the HP SDN App Store and an SDN developer community forum. The SDN App Store can be used to browse, search, purchase, and download SDN applications onto the HP VAN SDN controller. HP SDN infrastructure technologies, including over 50 OpenFlow-enabled switches such as the HP FlexFabric 5930 Switch Series, support the Virtual Extensible LAN (VXLAN), an encapsulation protocol for running virtual networks across the network. The HP Virtual Cloud Networking (VCN) SDN Application provides a multitenant network virtualization service for KVM and VMware ESX multi-hypervisor data center applications and acts as a bridge between the HP Helion OpenStack cloud computing platform and the HP VAN SDN controller.
- Data Center Interconnect (DCI): Data center interconnect services are intended to extend the benefits of multi-tenant private clouds across multiple data centers.
- HP Unified Wired and Wireless Access: Products are intended to unify campus networks and include routers, SDN applications, switches, IEEE 802.11ac access points and unified wall jacks, and controllers.
- Intelligent Resilient Framework (IRF): The HP IRF switch platform virtualization technology is intended to simplify the design and operations of data center and campus Ethernet networks.

== Training and certification ==
HP Networking Training covers product-, service-, and sales-oriented topics. The HP ExpertOne program networking training and certification program covers a range of networking curricula, from beginning-level courses to Master engineer classes, on three separate tracks: technical, sales, and partner-restricted. Fast-track programs are designed for participants to build upon current industry certifications from Cisco and other companies. In early 2014, HP initiated eight new sales certifications for its technology partners, designed to lower the cost and simplify the training process by narrowing the focus and making the certifications more specific, though no less deep. The new certifications are role-based.

== HP AllianceOne Program ==
In January 2009, Hewlett Packard launched the ProCurve Open Network Ecosystem (ONE) Alliance, and a programmable module which hosts partner applications from IP telephony to network management This multivendor alliance program objective was to optimize performance of enterprise-class applications with the then ProCurve's (now HP Networking) infrastructure.

In April 2010, HP combined the ProCurve ONE alliance program with the programs from 3Com and Tipping Point, and programs from the rest of HP's Enterprise Business to create a new program called HP AllianceOne.

The HP Networking Specialization program of HP AllianceOne works with alliance partners who develop applications or services that capitalize on integrated network capabilities for business purposes.

== Support ==
HP Networking provides a lifetime warranty on some of its products with next business day advanced shipment. This was seen as a Unique Selling Point, until other networking vendors offered similar warranty on part of their product lines.

== User community ==
The HP Enterprise Business Community page provides resources for HP Networking users, including announcements, tips, and tricks, community feedback and suggestions, and events. Forums include discussion boards and blogs.

== Open Networking Foundation ==
HP Networking is a founding member of the Open Networking Foundation started on March 23, 2011. Other founding companies include Google, Microsoft, Yahoo, Verizon, Deutsche Telekom and 17 other companies. The nonprofit organization is focused on providing support for software-defined networking. The initiative is meant to speed innovation through simple software changes in telecommunications networks, wireless networks, data centers and other networking areas.
