= IEEE Emanuel R. Piore Award =

The IEEE Emanuel R. Piore Award was a Technical Field Award given each year by the IEEE to an individual or team of two people who have made outstanding contributions to information processing systems in relation to computer science. The award was discontinued in 2012.

The award was established in 1976 and named in honor of Emanuel R. Piore. It could be presented to an individual or a team of two. Recipients of this award received a bronze medal, certificate, and honorarium.

== Recipients ==
The following people received the IEEE Emanuel R. Piore Award:

- 2012: Fred B. Schneider
- 2011: Shafi Goldwasser
- 2010: Nancy Lynch
- 2009: David DeWitt
- 2008: Richard Rashid
- 2007: Randal Bryant
- 2006: Robert K. Brayton
- 2005: Jacob A. Abraham
- 2004: Leslie Lamport
- 2003: Giovanni De Micheli
- 2002: Brian Randell
- 2001: Ravishanker K. Iyer
- 2000: William Kahan
- 1999: Narendra Ahuja
- 1998: Janak H. Patel
- 1997: Shun'ichi Amari
- 1996: Edward J. McCluskey
- 1995: Yale N. Patt
- 1994: John L. Hennessy
- 1993: Makoto Nagao
- 1992: Harold S. Stone
- 1991: Joseph F. Traub
- 1990: Allen Newell
- 1989: Peter A. Franaszek
- 1988: Grace Hopper
- 1987: David Kuck
- 1986: David C. Evans and Ivan Sutherland
- 1985: Azriel Rosenfeld
- 1984: Harvey Cragon
- 1983: Niklaus Wirth
- 1982: Ken Thompson and Dennis Ritchie
- 1981: No Award
- 1980: Lawrence Rabiner and Ronald W. Schafer
- 1979: Richard Hamming
- 1978: J. Presper Eckert and John Mauchly
- 1977: George Stibitz
