= Carbon nanotube computer =

Computer using carbon nanotube transistors

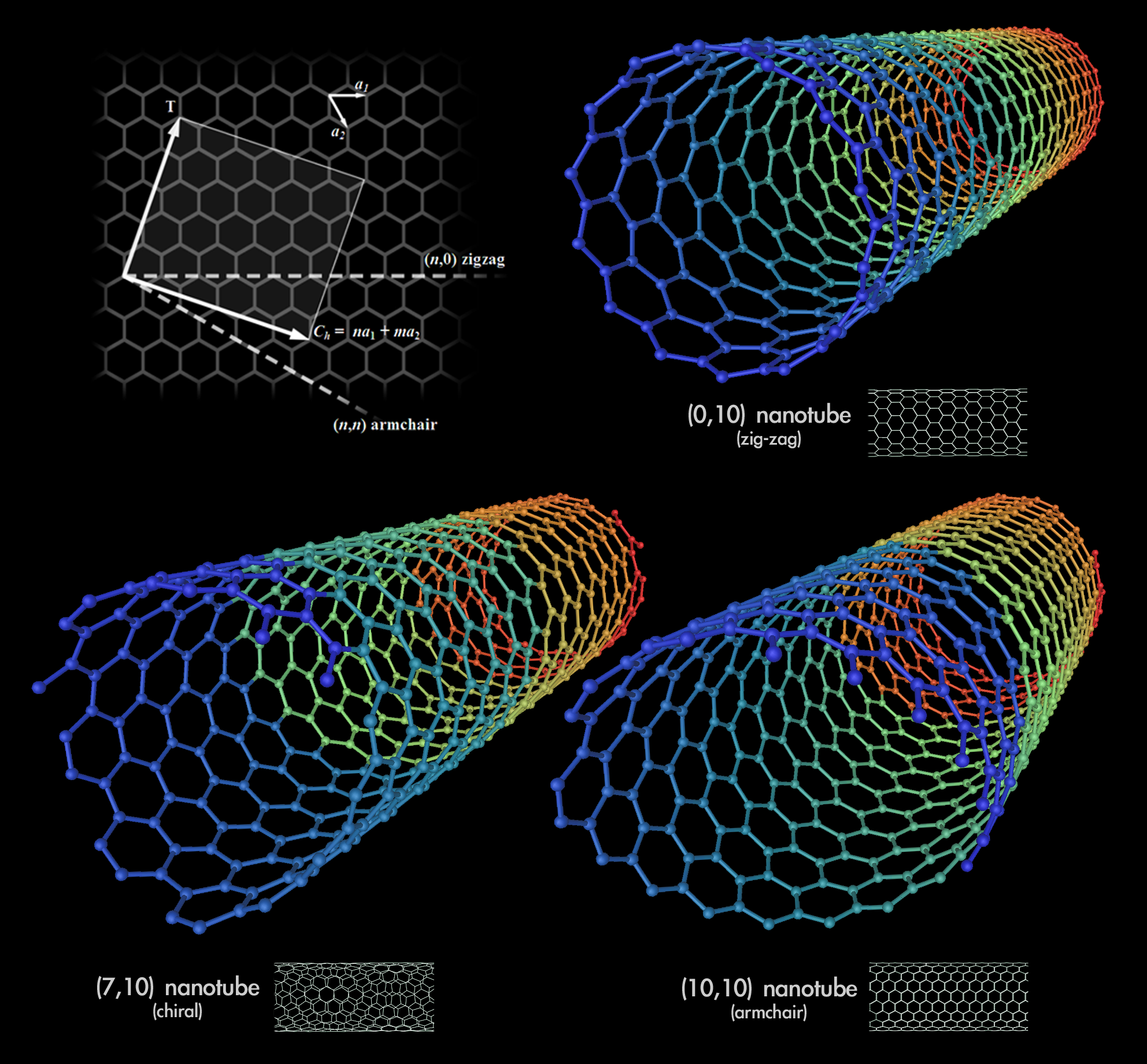
Types of carbon nanotubes

Carbon nanotube computers are a class of experimental computing processors constructed from carbon nanotube field-effect transistors, instead of from conventional silicon-based field-effect transistors.

In a carbon nanotube field-effect transistor (CNTFET), the conduction channel is made from carbon nanotubes, rather than from doped silicon. In theory, CNTFETs are more efficient than silicon FETs: CNFETs require less energy to turn them on and off, and the slope between on/off states is steeper. These factors contribute to an energy–delay product (an energy efficiency metric) that is an order of magnitude better than with silicon-based transistors. Moreover, carbon is an excellent conductor of heat, and carbon-based transistors can therefore dissipate heat much faster than silicon-based ones. This factor, combined with better heat tolerance, could theoretically allow carbon nanotube transistors to be packed more densely together, which in turn could reduce material and electrical losses.

These characteristics suggest that carbon nanotubes are a potential substitute for silicon with regards to CNTFETs and logic circuits. But CNTFETs cannot (yet) be mass manufactured, and therefore carbon nanotube processors cannot either, and both are currently limited to research facilities where they are manually assembled. The first carbon nanotube computer was built in 2013 by Max Shulaker and coworkers at Stanford University. This one-bit processor, named Cedric, ran at 1 KHz and contained just 178 transistors. Since then, many research teams have built increasingly complex processors with CNTFETs. In 2019, a team of engineers from the Massachusetts Institute of Technology and Analog Devices created a programmable 16-bit, ~15,000-transistor processor called the RV16X-NANO.

== Major milestones ==
=== Cedric ===
Carbon nanotubes are difficult to position accurately on a substrate, but in 2012 IBM researchers discovered that carbon nanotubes could be made to chemically self-assemble themselves into patterned arrays in which the nanotubes stick in some areas of the surface while leaving other areas untouched.

In 2013, a team of researchers at Stanford University refined the technique discovered at IBM such that misaligned nanotubes could be destroyed on the wafer, leaving only the aligned ones intact. To destroy the misaligned nanotubes, the researchers subjected them to high voltage, which vaporized them. The researchers used the same method to eliminate transistors in which the carbon nanotubes were unswitchable conductors (thus nicknamed "metallic" nanotubes).

The researchers applied these refinements to a wafer with 197 8-micrometer (8,000 nanometer) carbon nanotube based transistors on a silicon oxide substrate, leaving 178 usable transistors. With these, the researchers created a one-bit, single-instruction, Turing-complete processor. Named 'Cedric', the only operation the computer could perform was SUBNEG, short for "subtract and branch if negative". With SUBNEG, Cedric could count and sort integers, and could switch between sorting and counting modes.

=== RV16XNano ===
In 2019, a team at the Massachusetts Institute of Technology in cooperation with engineers from Analog Devices created a 16-bit programmable processor with nearly 15,000 carbon nanotube transistors. Called RV16XNano, the processor implemented a significant portion of the 32-bit RISC-V instruction set and was able to execute a "Hello, World!" program that said "Hello, world! I am RV16XNano, made from CNTs".
