= Kay-Yut Chen =

American economist

- Education: California Institute of Technology
- Scientific career
- Fields: Behavioral operations research, Experimental economics, Consumer behaviour
- Workplaces: HP Labs; Yahoo! Labs; University of Texas at Arlington
- Thesis: The Strategic Behavior of Rational Novices (1994)
- Doctoral advisors: John O. Ledyard; Charles Plott

Kay-Yut Chen is an experimental economist best known for pioneering the application of behavioral economics to business management. The experimental economics lab he founded at HP Labs was the first such lab in any company. His work at HP Labs has been featured in Newsweek, the Wall Street Journal, and Scientific American.

Chen is co-author of a book about the business applications of behavioral economics, Secrets of the Moneylab, co-authored with journalist Marina Krakovsky, and published by Portfolio/Penguin in 2010. Nobel laureate George Akerlof wrote the foreword to the book.

He has also worked as principal research scientist at Yahoo! Labs.

He earned his PhD in economics from California Institute of Technology in 1994, where his research advisors were John Ledyard and Charles Plott. In 1992 he was an Alfred P. Sloan fellow.

He is currently a professor at the University of Texas at Arlington.
