= Aruba Networks =

American wireless networking equipment company

HPE Aruba Networking
- Formerly: Aruba Networks
- Company type: Subsidiary
- Traded as: Nasdaq: ARUN
- Industry: Computer networking
- Founded: February 2002; 24 years ago, in Sunnyvale, California, U.S.
- Headquarters: Santa Clara, California
- Revenue: ▲US$3.6 billion (FY 2022)
- Number of employees: 6000+
- Parent: Hewlett Packard Enterprise
- Website: arubanetworking.hpe.com

HPE Aruba Networking, formerly known as Aruba Networks, is a Santa Clara, California-based security and networking subsidiary of Hewlett Packard Enterprise company.

The company was founded in Sunnyvale, California in 2002 by Keerti Melkote and Pankaj Manglik. On March 2, 2015, Hewlett-Packard announced it would acquire Aruba Networks for approximately US$3 billion. On May 19, 2015, HP completed the acquisition. As of November 1, 2015, the company operates as the "Intelligent Edge" business unit of the Hewlett Packard Enterprise company, which encompasses all of HP/HPE's networking and security related operations and acquisitions. The company's products include network switches, access points, hotspots, and wireless controllers.

Following their acquisition of Juniper Networks, Hewlett Packard Enterprise agreed to divest their Instant On technology and patents as part of an agreement with the United States Department of Justice that allowed the acquisition to pass regulatory approval.

== Acquisitions ==
Company Acquired	Date of Acquisition	Business	Country	Price
AXIS	March 2, 2023	Cloud-based Security Software(SSE, SASE)	Israel	$471M
Athonet	February 24, 2023	Private 5G	Italy	NA
Silver Peak Systems	September 21, 2020	Wide Area Networks (WANs)	U.S.	$925M
Cape Networks	March 27, 2018	Network Security	South Africa	N/A
Niara Inc.	February 1, 2017	Network Security	U.S.	N/A
Rasa Networks	May 9, 2016	Network Performance Management and Analytics	U.S.	N/A
Aruba Networks (acquired by HPE)	May 19, 2015	Wireless Networking	U.S.	$2.7B
Meridian Apps	May 16, 2013	Location Services	U.S.	N/A
Avenda Systems	December 8, 2011	Network Access Security	U.S.	N/A
Amigopod Pty Ltd. Assets and Technology	December 14, 2010	Network Authentication Solutions	Australia	N/A
Azalea Networks	September 2, 2010	Outdoor Mesh Wireless Technology	U.S.	$40.5M
3Com	April 22, 2010	Network Interface Controller (NIC)	U.S.	$2.7B
AirWave Wireless	January 9, 2008	Wi-Fi Hotspot	U.S.	N/A
Network Chemistry	July 23, 2007	Wi-Fi Security	U.S.	N/A

== See also ==
- HPE Networking
- ProCurve
- ProCurve Products
