= IEEE Transactions on Dependable and Secure Computing =

- Discipline: Computer security and dependability
- Language: English
- Edited by: Jaideep Vaidya

Publication details
- History: 2004-present
- Publisher: IEEE Computer Society
- Frequency: Bimonthly
- Open access: Hybrid
- Impact factor: 6.404 (2018)

Standard abbreviations
- ISO 4: IEEE Trans. Dependable Secure Comput.

Indexing
- CODEN: ITDSCM
- ISSN: 1545-5971 (print); 1941-0018 (web)
- LCCN: 2003215339
- OCLC no.: 1068636056

Links
- Journal homepage; Online access; Online archive

The IEEE Transactions on Dependable and Secure Computing is a bimonthly peer-reviewed scientific journal covering all aspects of dependability and security. It is published by the IEEE Computer Society and was established in 2004. The current editor-in-chief is Jaideep Vaidya (Rutgers University). According to the Journal Citation Reports, the journal has a 2019 impact factor of 6.404.
