= Network Chemistry =

Network Chemistry was a Wi-Fi security startup based in Redwood City, California. The firm was founded in 2002 by several co-founders including Gary Ramah, Rob Markovich and Dr. Christopher Waters and is backed by venture capital firms such as San Francisco-based Geneva Venture Partners, Innovacom and In-Q-Tel, the investment arm of the CIA.

The company sold products such as RFprotect Distributed, a wireless intrusion detection system; RFprotect Endpoint, a laptop security product; and RFprotect Mobile, a portable tool for analyzing network security. The final product was RFprotect Scanner, a wired-side rogue access point detection and mitigation system utilizing patent-pending device fingerprinting technology.

Network Chemistry also created the Wireless Vulnerabilities and Exploits database, which is the result of a collaborative industry effort to catalog and define exploits and vulnerabilities specifically related to the use of wireless technologies in IT networks.

The wireless security business of Network Chemistry was sold to Aruba Networks (NASDAQ: ARUN) in July 2007.
