= Peter Franaszek =

American information theorist

Peter Anthony Franaszek
- Born: c. 1940
- Education: Brown University (Sc.B. 1962); Princeton University (Ph.D. 1966)
- Awards: IEEE Richard W. Hamming Medal; Paris Kanellakis Theory and Practice Award; IEEE Emanuel R. Piore Award
- Scientific career
- Fields: Information theory
- Workplaces: IBM T.J. Watson Research Center
- Thesis: On Sampled Data and Time Varying Systems (1965)
- Doctoral advisor: Bede Liu

Peter A. Franaszek is an American information theorist, an IEEE Fellow, a research staff member emeritus at the IBM T.J. Watson Research Center and a former member of the IBM Academy of Technology. He received his Sc.B. from Brown University in 1962, and his Ph.D. from Princeton University in 1966.

His work was mainly on the representation of information for storage and transmission, and the placement and movement of such information in computer systems. Specific areas include constrained coding, compression algorithms, I/O architectures, switching networks, disk defragmentation algorithms, concurrency control techniques, operating system schedulers, and compression techniques and architectures for systems with memory compression. Franaszek's coding research determined fundamental aspects of constrained coding, and obtained algorithms for code construction. In early work associated with his "principal state" technique for block code construction, he designed MS43, a ternary code for data transmission, a modified version of which, MMS43, became a European standard. His work also served as a basis for key components in the proliferation of disk drives, compact disks (CDs), and digital versatile disks (DVDs). Specific codes he developed have been widely used in commercial data storage and transmission products. His (2,7) RLL code found widespread application in disk drives in the 1980s and later in magnetic and optical recording applications. Together with Albert Widmer, he designed 8b/10b encoding used in gigabit telecommunication systems. As an emeritus, he, along with B.Abali and L. Lastras, coinvented an approach to a data compression engine using a hybrid of a content addressable memory and hashing (US Patent 9836238). This forms the basis for the compression/deflate engines embodied in the IBM z15 and Power9 processors.

== Awards ==
- IEEE Emanuel R. Piore Award –
  1989 "For contributions to the theory and practice of coding for contrained channels in digital recording."
- 2002: ACM Paris Kanellakis Theory and Practice Award
- 2009: IEEE Richard W. Hamming Medal for his contributions to the theory and practice of run-length limited channel coding for magnetic and optical storage.
