= Kaushik Roy (engineer) =

Professor of Electrical and Computer Engineering

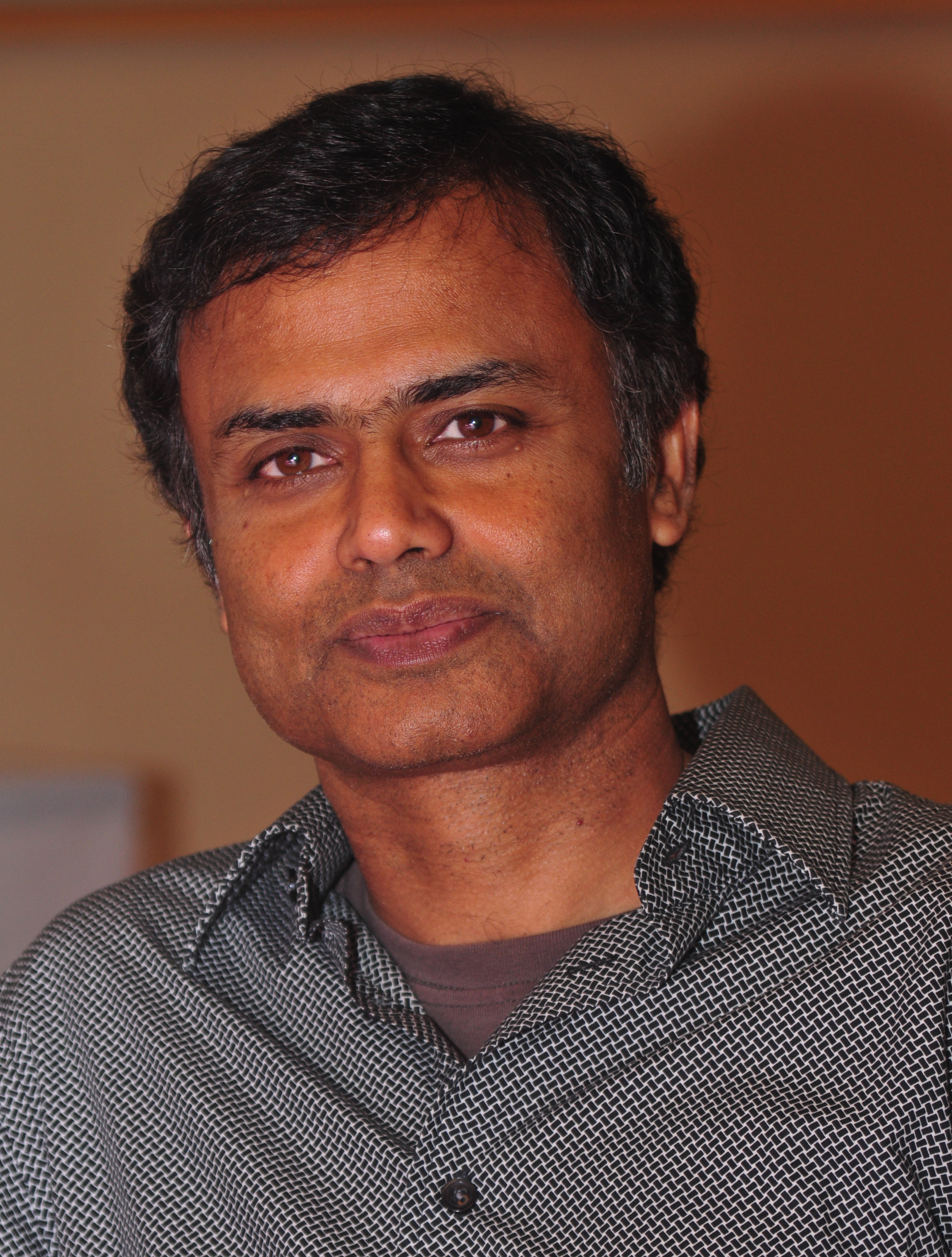
- Born: India
- Education: Indian Institute of Technology, Kharagpur; University of Illinois at Urbana-Champaign
- Awards: NSF Career Development Award; SRC Technical Excellence Award, SRC Inventors Award, SRC Aristotle Award, and SRC Innovation Award; IEEE Circuits and Systems Society Technical Achievement Award, IEEE TCVLSI Distinguished Research Award; Indian Institute of Technology Distinguished Alumnus Award; Purdue University Arden L. Bement Jr.
- Scientific career
- Fields: Cognitive algorithms, circuits and architecture for energy-efficient neuromorphic computing/machine learning and neuro-mimetic devices
- Workplaces: Purdue University
- Website: engineering.purdue.edu/NRL/Group

Kaushik Roy is a researcher and educator in the area of electrical and computer engineering. He is a Fellow of the Institute of Electrical and Electronics Engineers and holds the position of Edward G. Tiedemann, Jr., Distinguished Professor of Electrical and Computer Engineering at Purdue University. Roy was the Director of the Center for Brain-Inspired Computing (C-BRIC), and is currently the Director of the Institute of CHIPS and AI.

== Education ==
Roy earned his B.Tech. degree in Electronics & Electrical Engineering from the IIT, Kharagpur India in 1983. He earned his Ph.D. degree under the supervision of Jacob Abraham in the area of Electrical and Computer Engineering from the University of Illinois at Urbana-Champaign in 1990.

== Career ==
From 1990 to 1993, Roy was a member of the technical staff in the Semiconductor Process and Design Center at Texas Instruments in Texas. He joined Purdue University in the College of Engineering in 1993 as an Assistant Professor of Electrical Engineering on the West Lafayette campus in Indiana. In 1997, he was promoted to associate professor. He was promoted to full professor in 2001 and was named the Roscoe H. George Professor of Electrical Engineering. In 2012, he was named the Edward G. Tiedemann, Jr., Distinguished Professor.

He has supervised over 120 Ph.D. dissertations and co-authored two books on Low Power CMOS VLSI Design (John Wiley & McGraw Hill).

As of October 2026, Roy had 32 patents and more than 1,065 publications in books, journals, and conferences that have been cited more than 82,719 times.

== Honors and awards ==
Kaushik Roy is a Fellow of the IEEE (elected 2001) and has received numerous honors for contributions to integrated circuits, VLSI design, low-power electronics, memory systems, and neuromorphic computing. His major distinctions include the Humboldt Research Award for Senior Scientists (2010), the IEEE Charles Desoer Technical Achievement Award (2011), the Fulbright-Nehru Distinguished Chair for India (2013), the SRC Aristotle Award (2015), the IEEE Technical Committee on VLSI Distinguished Research Award (2021), the inaugural SRC Innovation Award (2022), and an Honorary Doctorate (Honoris Causa) from Aarhus University, Denmark (2023). He received the SRC Technical Excellence Award (2005), the Distinguished Alumnus Award from the Indian Institute of Technology Kharagpur (2011), the Arden Bement Research Award (2020), Purdue College of Engineering Research Excellence Award (2008), and Purdue College of Engineering Outstanding Faculty Mentor Award for Engineering Graduate Students (2021). Roy was named a Purdue University Faculty Scholar in 1998, served as Roscoe H. George Professor of Electrical and Computer Engineering, and was selected as a Vannevar Bush Faculty Fellow by the U.S. Department of Defense. He also received the NSF CAREER Award (1995), IBM Faculty Partnership Award (2001), AT&T/Lucent Foundation Award (1997), the Government of India National Scholarship (1977-78), and IIT Kharagpur Merit Scholarship (1979-83). His research group and collaborators have received numerous best paper and outstanding paper awards from IEEE, ACM/IEEE ISLPED, IEEE Transactions on VLSI Systems, IEEE Brain Technical Community, ICONS, IEEE NANO, the International Test Conference, and other international conferences and journals.
