= ProCurve =

Networking division of Hewlett-Packard (1998–2010)

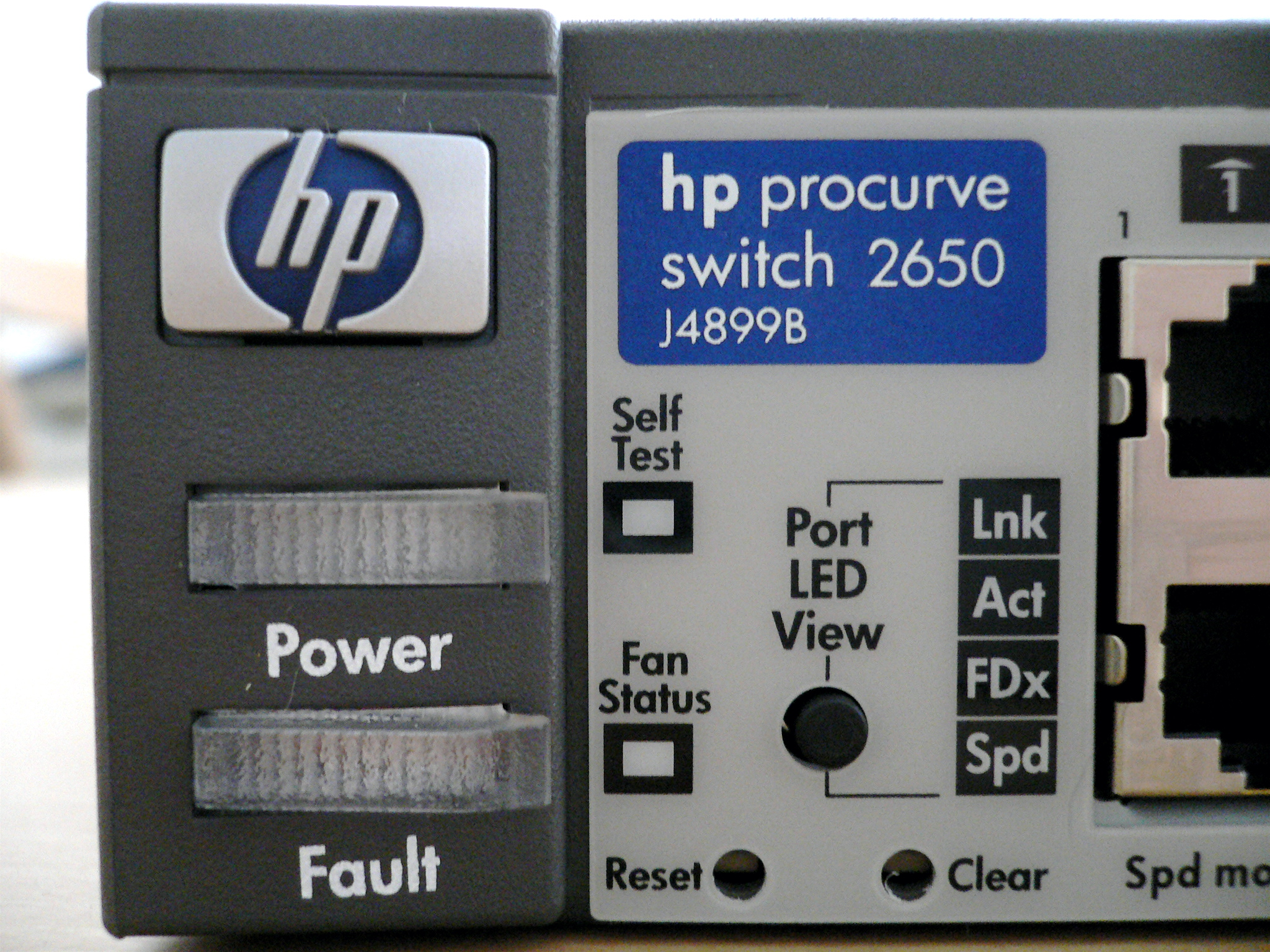
HP ProCurve 2650 switch front panel detail

HP ProCurve was the name of the networking division of Hewlett-Packard from 1998 to 2010. The name was associated with Ethernet switches that the company sold. The name of the division changed to HP Networking in September 2010, after HP bought 3Com Corporation.

== History ==
Founded in 1979, the division that eventually became known as the HP ProCurve division began in Roseville, California, although it would not be known under this name until 1998.

Originally, it was part of HP's Data Systems Division (DSD) and known as DSD-Roseville. Later, it was called the Roseville Networks Division (RND), then the Workgroup Networks Division (WND), before becoming the ProCurve Networking Business (PNB). The trademark filing date for the ProCurve name was February 25, 1998.

On August 11, 2008, HP announced the acquisition of Colubris Networks, a maker of wireless networking products. This was completed on October 1, 2008. In November 2008, HP ProCurve was moved into HP's largest business division, the Technology Services Group organization, with HP Enterprise Account Managers being compensated for sales. In November 2009, HP announced its intent to acquire 3Com for $2.7 billion. In April 2010, HP completed its acquisition.

At Interop Las Vegas in April 2010, HP began publicly using HP Networking as the name for its networking division. Following HP's 2015 acquisition of Aruba Networks and the company's subsequent split later that year, HP Networks was combined with Aruba to form HPE's Intelligent Edge business unit under the Aruba Networks brand.

== Products ==
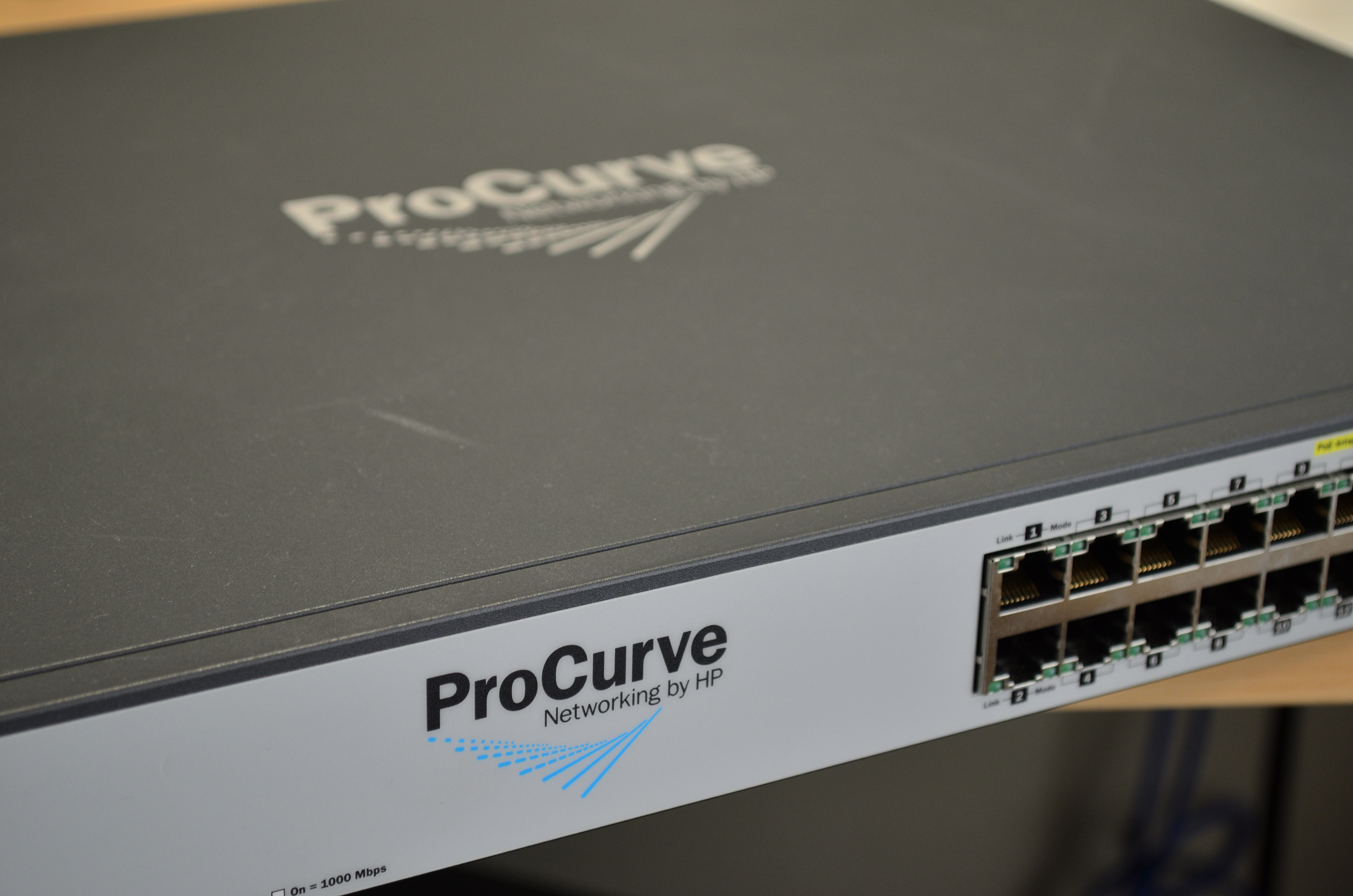
ProCurve Gigabit Ethernet switch

A variety of different networking products have been made by HP. The first products were named EtherTwist while printer connectivity products carried the JetDirect name. As the EtherTwist name faded, most of HP's networking products were given AdvanceStack names. Later, the then-ProCurve division began to offer LAN switches, Core, Datacenter, Distribution, Edge, Web managed and Unmanaged switches. The ProCurve was also used with Network Management, Routing and Security products.

== Notable uses ==
The International Space Station makes use of customized HP switches (model 2524 Switches) sold while the HP division was known as ProCurve.

== See also ==
- Aruba Networks
- ProCurve Products
