= Intelligent Resilient Framework =

Intelligent Resilient Framework (IRF) is a proprietary software virtualization technology originally developed by Huawei 3Com. It can connect and configure multiple network devices through physical ports and then virtualize the devices. This enables the unified management and maintenance of multiple devices. This technology is similar to the Cisco Virtual PortChannel (vpC).

== History ==
This technology was originally developed by 3Com and released in 2003 as XRN (eXpandable Resilient Networking). When HP Inc. purchased 3Com in April 2010, the technology was renamed to IRF.

== Overview ==
An IRF virtual device appears as a node on the network, which can be connected to in order to manage all members of the virtual device. The IRF is designed to combine the cost-effective benefits of box-type devices with the reliability of chassis-based devices. IRF proponents claim that an IRF-based network increases network resilience, performance, and availability, while also reducing the operating complexity. In simulated tests, IRF was found to be resilient to severe induced failures.

== Devices which support IRF ==
Currently, this technology is specific to HP Inc. products and solutions.

- HPE FlexNetwork HSR6800 Router Series
- HPE FlexFabric 5700 Switch Series
- HPE 5900 Switch Series
- HPE 5920 Switch Series
- HPE 5940 Switch Series
- HPE 6125XLG Ethernet Blade Switch
- HPE FlexFabric 12900E Switch Series

== See also ==
- IEEE 802.1aq (Shortest Path Bridging)
- H3C
- HPE
- Huawei
- Link aggregation
- TRILL (Transparent Interconnection of Lots of Links)
