= Ravishankar K. Iyer =

Indian electrical engineer

- Born: Ravishankar K. Iyer; New Delhi, India
- Education: Ph.D.
- Alma mater: University of Queensland
- Occupation: Professor
- Years active: 1977–present
- Website: depend.csl.illinois.edu/

Ravishankar K. Iyer (born 1949, New Delhi) is the George and Ann Fisher Distinguished Professor of Engineering at the University of Illinois at Urbana-Champaign. He is a specialist in reliable and secure networks and systems.

== Biography ==
Iyer received his BA and Ph.D. Degrees from the University of Queensland in 1970 and 1977 respectively. He then went to Stanford University on a CSIRO Fellowship. After four years at Stanford, he moved to the University of Illinois at Urbana-Champaign.

Professor Iyer leads the DEPEND Group at CSL, with a multidisciplinary focus on systems and software that combine deep measurement-driven analytics and machine learning with applications in trust and health.

Iyer is a Fellow of the American Association for the Advancement of Science (AAAS), the Institute of Electrical and Electronics Engineers (IEEE), and the Association for Computing Machinery (ACM). He has received several awards, including the IEEE Emanuel R. Piore Award, and the 2011 Outstanding Contributions award by the Association for Computing Machinery. Professor Iyer is also the recipient of the degree of Doctor Honoris Causa from Toulouse Sabatier University in France.

== Academic work ==
He holds joint appointments in the Department of Electrical and Computer Engineering, the Coordinated Science Laboratory (CSL), the Department of Computer Science, the National Center for Supercomputing Applications, the Carle Illinois College of Medicine, and the Carl R. Woese Institute for Genomic Biology. He also serves as Director of the Center for Reliable and High-Performance Computing at Illinois and as Chief Scientist of the Information Trust Institute. He is also a faculty Research Affiliate at the Mayo Clinic, and a Yeoh Ghin Seng Distinguished Visiting Professor of the National University Health System, Singapore. Previously, he was the Director of the Coordinated Science Laboratory. He was the Interim Vice-Chancellor for Research (2008–2011).

He was the institutional lead and is a technical area lead on Illinois’ Blue Waters Petascale project funded by a $200M NSF grant.

== Research ==
Iyer has authored or co-authored close to three hundred refereed publications.
