= Max Shulaker =

American electrical engineer

Max M. Shulaker is a Stanford-educated American electrical engineer and was a professor at MIT credited with the development of the first carbon nanotube computer and the first modern microprocessor built from carbon nanotube transistors. His research was widely reported in US and British media. He left his position as a professor to pursue medical studies at NYU and is currently a clinical instructor.
