= HPE Discover =

HPE Discover is the Hewlett Packard Enterprise showcase technology event for business and government customers. In 2011, HP Enterprise Business, along with participating independent user groups, combined its annual HP Software Universe, HP Technology Forum and HP Technology@Work into a single event, HP Discover. There are now two HPE Discover events annually, one for the Americas and one for Europe, Middle East and Africa (EMEA). Since the split of Hewlett-Packard into HP Inc and Hewlett Packard Enterprise, HP Discover was replaced with HPE Discover focusing on the enterprise company's products and services.

== HP Discover 2011 ==
HP Discover 2011 Americas took place June 6–10, in Las Vegas at the Venetian/Palazzo. The event offered nearly a thousand sessions on application transformation, converged infrastructure, information optimization, mobile devices, WebOS, global data centers, security, hybrid delivery and cloud computing.

Approximately ten thousand customers, partners and IT thought leaders attended HP Discover 2011 in Las Vegas and approximately 5,000 attended the EMEA event. The Americas conference featured tracks designed for several industries including automotive and aerospace; communications, media & entertainment, energy, financial services, healthcare and life sciences, high-tech and electronics, public sector, retail and consumer goods, and transportation and logistics. The nearly one thousand sessions, hands-on labs and exhibits explored all areas of the HP Enterprise Business portfolio including servers, storage, networking, software and services. In addition, the company provided sneak previews of its new tablet device, webOS TouchPad which will be available in July 2011.

In addition to breakout sessions, the event offered hands-on labs, thought leadership keynotes and opportunities to network with peers, HP executives, senior technologists, and HP partners. HP Discover 2011-Las Vegas sponsors included Microsoft, SAP, Intel, Brocade, Emulex, Alcatel-Lucent, AMD, VMware, Samsung and many others.

The HP Discover 2011 event in EMEA took place in Vienna, Austria, at the Reed Exhibitions, Messe Wien Congress Center, on November 29 through December 1, 2011.

== HPE Discover dates and locations ==
- June 6–10, 2011: Las Vegas
- November 29 - December 1, 2011: Vienna
- June 4-7, 2012: Las Vegas
- December 4-6, 2012: Frankfurt
- June 11-13, 2013: Las Vegas
- December 10-12, 2013: Barcelona
- June 09-12, 2014: Las Vegas
- December 2-4, 2014: Barcelona
- June 2-4, 2015: Las Vegas
- December 1-3, 2015: London
- June 7-9, 2016: Las Vegas
- November 29 - December 1, 2016: London
- June 5-8, 2017: Las Vegas
- November 28-30, 2017: Madrid
- June 18-21, 2018: Las Vegas
- November 27-29, 2018: Madrid
- June 18-20, 2019: Las Vegas
- Starting June 23, 2020: HPE Virtual Event
- November 10-11, 2024: Barcelona
- December 3-4, 2025: Barcelona
- June 15-18, 2026: Las Vegas
- December 2-3, 2026: Barcelona
