= Prith Banerjee =

Indian computer scientist

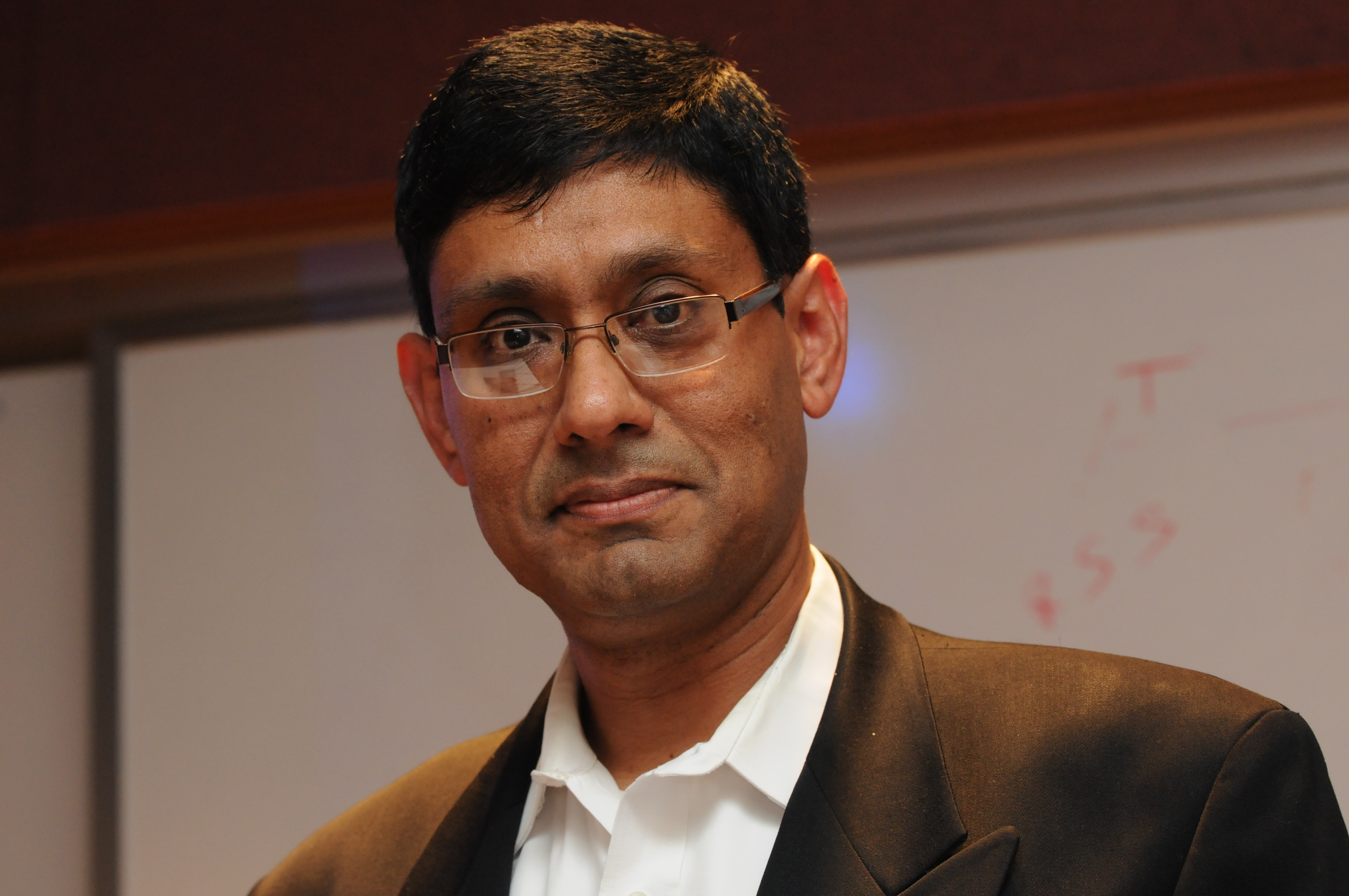
- Prith Banerjee
- Born: Prithviraj "Prith" Banerjee
- Occupation: Chief Technology Officer Ansys

Prithviraj "Prith" Banerjee (born 1960) is an Indian American academic and computer scientist and is currently the chief technology officer at ANSYS and board member at Cray and CUBIC. Previously, he was a Senior Client Partner at Korn Ferry where he was responsible for IOT and Digital Transformation Advisory Services within the Global Industrial Practice. Before that he was the executive vice president and chief technology officer at Schneider Electric. He was formerly a senior vice president of research at Hewlett Packard and director of HP Labs. Previously he was the chief technology officer and executive vice president of ABB Group. He was also the managing director of global technology R&D at Accenture. Prith started his early career in academia as a professor at the University of Illinois and Northwestern University.

== Early life and career ==
Born in Khartoum, Sudan, he received his Ph.D. and M.S. in electrical engineering from the University of Illinois at Urbana-Champaign in 1984 and 1982 respectively, and his B.Tech. degree in electronics and electrical communication engineering from the Indian Institute of Technology, Kharagpur in 1981.

Banerjee began his career in academia, in which he served 22 years. After he became a professor of electrical and computer engineering at Northwestern, it frustrated him that while his graduate students and himself were developing technologies they weren't having much success at getting others to use these technologies. This frustration with the lack of transfer from academia to the consumer is what motivated Banerjee to found AccelChip. While on leave from Northwestern University (2000 to 2002), Banerjee, with the help of his team of graduate students, started AccelChip, a developer of products and services for electronic design automation.

He served at AccelChip as president and CEO, raising $2.3 million in financing, helping the company build its first product and guiding the company's growth to 25 employees and $800,000 in revenues. After leaving the helm of AccelChip, he continued to guide the company as a consultant in his role of chief scientist. AccelChip was sold to Xilinx in 2006.

He then founded BINACHIP, which like AccelChip, develops products and services in electronic design automation. He served at BINACHP as chairman and chief scientist.

Additionally, Banerjee has served on the technical advisory boards of several companies, including Ambit Design Systems, Atrenta and Calypto Design Systems. Banerjee has published approximately 350 papers in the areas of VLSI computer aided design, parallel computing, and compilers. He has also authored a book, Parallel Algorithms for VLSI CAD and served as associate editor of four journals. Additionally he has served at more than 50 conferences in the capacity of program chair, general chair, and program committee member.

== HP role ==
Banerjee joined HP in 2007. As the senior vice president of research at Hewlett Packard, Banerjee helped develop technical strategies for the company. He also headed up HP Labs, the company's central research organization, which had seven locations worldwide.

Under him, Hewlett-Packard's laboratories had placed larger bets on fewer projects, and have systematically sought outside ideas. He has dismissed the cast-offs as interesting science projects and championed the survivors as big bets with the most commercial potential. He led a group of 500 researchers, whose objective was to innovate five to 15 years beyond the focus of the rest of the company's 30,000 R&D engineers.

Banerjee believes in having locations for research organizations in various locations around the world (currently HP Labs has seven locations, including India, Russia, China and Israel) – not for access to cheap labor, but for ability to tap into innovation in local markets tailored to those local markets.

Banerjee is currently a member of the board of directors of Cray and CUBIC systems. Formerly he has served on the Computer Science and Telecommunications Board (CSTB) of the United States National Academies.

== ABB's chief technology officer ==
On April 5, 2012, ABB Group announced appointing Banerjee to the ABB executive committee as CTO (chief technology officer). In this role, he headed up the technology directions for both corporate and divisional technology which includes more than 8000 scientists and engineers in seven ABB Research Centers around the world.

== Accenture's managing director of global technology R&D ==
As on June 5, 2013 Accenture announced appointing Banerjee to as managing director of global technology R&D. In his new role, he oversees the Accenture Technology Labs, the global technology R&D organization within Accenture which explores new and emerging technologies, and directs Accenture's annual Technology Vision research, which looks at the future of enterprise IT and makes recommendations for how companies can take advantage of technology to improve their competitiveness, operations and business results.

== CTO at Schneider Electric ==
During September 1, 2015 to June 15, 2017, Prith Banerjee was an executive vice president and chief technology officer of Schneider Electric. . In this role he was responsible for driving innovation and technology differentiation, and coordinating the R&D activities of the company across its five businesses with 8,000 R&D personnel, and a 1.2 billion Euro R&D investment. Prith was in charge of accelerating Schneider Electric's R&D throughput and of driving the Innovation and R&D Simplification Programs under the company program “Schneider is On”.

== Senior Client Partner at Korn Ferry ==
During June 15, 2017, to September 30, 2018, Prith Banerjee was a Senior Client Partner at Korn Ferry. In this role he is responsible for IoT and Digital Transformation Advisory Services within the Global Industrial Practice.

== CTO at Ansys ==
As of October 1, 2018, Prith Banerjee became a Chief Technology Officer at Ansys. In this role he is responsible for driving the long-term technology strategy of the company in areas such as high-performance computing, AI/machine learning, cloud and platforms, and digital engineering.

== Awards and honors ==
He is a Fellow of the Association for Computing Machinery (2000), the Institute of Electrical and Electronics Engineers (1995) and the American Association for the Advancement of Science (2005).

In 1996, he received the Frederick Emmons Terman Award from the American Society for Engineering Education. In 2000, the IEEE Computer Society honored him with the Taylor L. Booth Education Award.

Previous awards include: the University Scholar award from the University of Illinois (1993), the Senior Xerox Research Award (1992), the Presidential Young Investigator Award from the National Science Foundation (1987), the IBM Young Faculty Development Award (1986), and the President of India Gold Medal from the IIT, Kharagpur (1981).
