= List of Hewlett-Packard executive leadership =

List of HP executive leadership

This List of Hewlett-Packard executive leadership includes chairmen, presidents and CEOs of Hewlett-Packard.

- Co-founder: David Packard (president: 1947; chairman: 1964–1969; chairman 1971–1993)
- Co-founder: William Hewlett (vice president: 1947; executive vice president: 1957; president: 1964; CEO: 1969; chairman of the Executive Committee 1978; vice chairman 1983–1987)
- CEO: John A. Young (1978–October 31, 1992)
- CEO: Lewis Platt (November 1, 1992–July 18, 1999; chairman 1993–July 18, 1999)
- Chairman: Richard Hackborn (January, 2000–September 22, 2000; lead independent director September 22, 2006–)
- CEO: Carly Fiorina (July 19, 1999–February 9, 2005; chairwoman September 22, 2000–February 9, 2005)
- President: Michael Capellas (May 3, 2002 – November 12, 2002)
- Interim CEO: Robert Wayman (February 9, 2005–March 28, 2005)
- Chairwoman: Patricia C. Dunn (February 9, 2005–September 22, 2006).
- President and CEO: Mark Hurd (CEO: April 1, 2005–August 6, 2010; chairman: September 22, 2006–August 6, 2010)
- Interim CEO: Cathie Lesjak (August 6, 2010–September 30, 2010)
- President and CEO: Léo Apotheker (September 30, 2010–September 22, 2011)
- Executive chairman: Raymond J. Lane (September 22, 2011–April 4, 2013)
- Nonexecutive chairman: Ralph V. Whitworth (April 4, 2013–July 16, 2014))
- Chairwoman, president and CEO: Meg Whitman (president and CEO: September 22, 2011–November 2, 2015; chairman: July 18, 2014–January 31, 2018)

HP Inc.

- CEO: Dion Weisler (November 2, 2015 – November 1, 2019)
- CEO: Enrique Lores (November 2, 2019 – February 3, 2026)
- Current interim CEO: Bruce Broussard (February 3, 2026–)

Hewlett Packard Enterprise

- CEO: Meg Whitman (November 2, 2015 – February 1, 2018)
- Current: CEO: Antonio Neri (February 1, 2018)
