= FluBot =

Android malware propagated using fake SMS messages

FluBot is a sophisticated SMS computer virus, specifically a banking trojan, which attempts to exfiltrate private data from Android smart phones. Unlike most malware of this type, FluBot has proven exceptionally resilient, It masquerades as innocuous messages such as missed calls and deliveries, socially engineering the reader into installing spyware. A variant, TeaBot, has been seen on official app stores, including Google Play Store, in the guise of a QR-code reader.

16,000 reports of FluBot were reported to the Australian Competition & Consumer Commission's Scamwatch in Australia across eight weeks in 2021. Although coverage of FluBot primarily centres on Australia and New Zealand, the scam has also targeted European countries such as Germany and Poland in 2022 campaigns.

In May 2022, FluBot infrastructure was taken down in an operation involving 11 countries and it is not expected to resurge.
