= Hotel thief =

Person who steals from hotel guest rooms

A hotel thief is a person who steals items from the rooms of guests at a hotel.

Hotels may attract thieves for several reasons. Guest rooms are often unoccupied for much of the day, and valuable possessions may be left in the room rather than stored in a hotel's safe. In addition, a thief can often leave a hotel without attracting attention, since guests routinely arrive and depart with luggage.

Although hotel-room security has improved with the introduction of more advanced locks, hotel theft has not been eliminated. A thief may gain access to a room without picking a lock, for example by using social engineering and claiming to be a guest who has left a key inside. Property may also be stolen while a guest is distracted, such as during check-in.

One of the most prolific hotel thieves was Ernest Le Ford, who stole thousands of dollars' worth of jewellery from hotels in New York City during the early 20th century, including $8,000 worth from a room at the Manhattan Square Hotel. Another 19th-century hotel thief stole $60,000 worth of gold dust from a hotel in San Francisco.

The term has also been used more loosely to describe hotel guests who steal property from hotels. In 2019, CNN reported on a survey of 1,157 four- and five-star hoteliers concerning the items most frequently stolen by guests.
