= Ann Baskins =

American lawyer (born 1955)

Ann O'Neil Baskins (born August 5, 1955 in Red Bluff, California, USA) is former General Counsel for Hewlett-Packard Company (HP). Baskins was linked to the HP pretexting scandal. On September 28, 2006, following public disclosure of the matter, Baskins resigned effective immediately, hours before she was to appear as a witness before the House Committee on Energy and Commerce at which she would later invoke the Fifth Amendment to "not be held to answer for a capital, or otherwise infamous crime." Baskins was never charged by California or federal authorities.

She was a contestant on Tic Tac Dough in the Spring 1980 but lost to all-time Tic Tac Dough champion Thom McKee. Baskins was succeeded by Charles Charnas, a member of her team, who became HP Acting General Counsel. On February 8, 2007, HP CEO Mark Hurd appointed Michael Holston as HP Executive Vice President and General Counsel, effective February 22, 2007.

== Career ==
- Crosby, Heafey, Roach & May (now Reed Smith Crosby Heafey), 1980 to 1981
  - Associate
- Hewlett-Packard Company, 1982 to September 28, 2006
  - Attorney, 1982
  - Senior Attorney, 1985
  - Assistant Secretary, 1985
  - Corporate Counsel, 1986
  - Corporate Secretary, 1999 to 2006
  - Vice President, November 1999 to 2002
  - General Counsel (company's top lawyer), January 2000 to 2006
  - Senior Vice President, 2002 to 2006

== Bar admissions ==
- State Bar of California, December 16, 1980

== Other memberships ==
- American Bar Association
- American Corporate Counsel Association
- American Society of Corporate Secretaries
- Silicon Valley Association of General Counsels (SVAGC)

== Education ==
- B.A., History, Stanford University, Stanford, California, USA, 1977
- J.D., UCLA School of Law, Los Angeles, California, USA, 1980

== Awards ==
- California Law Business, #1 attorney in annual list of California's top 50 counsel, 2001

== Personal ==
- Husband is Thomas C. DeFilipps, partner in law firm Wilson Sonsini Goodrich & Rosati
