= Léo Apotheker =

German business executive (born 1953)

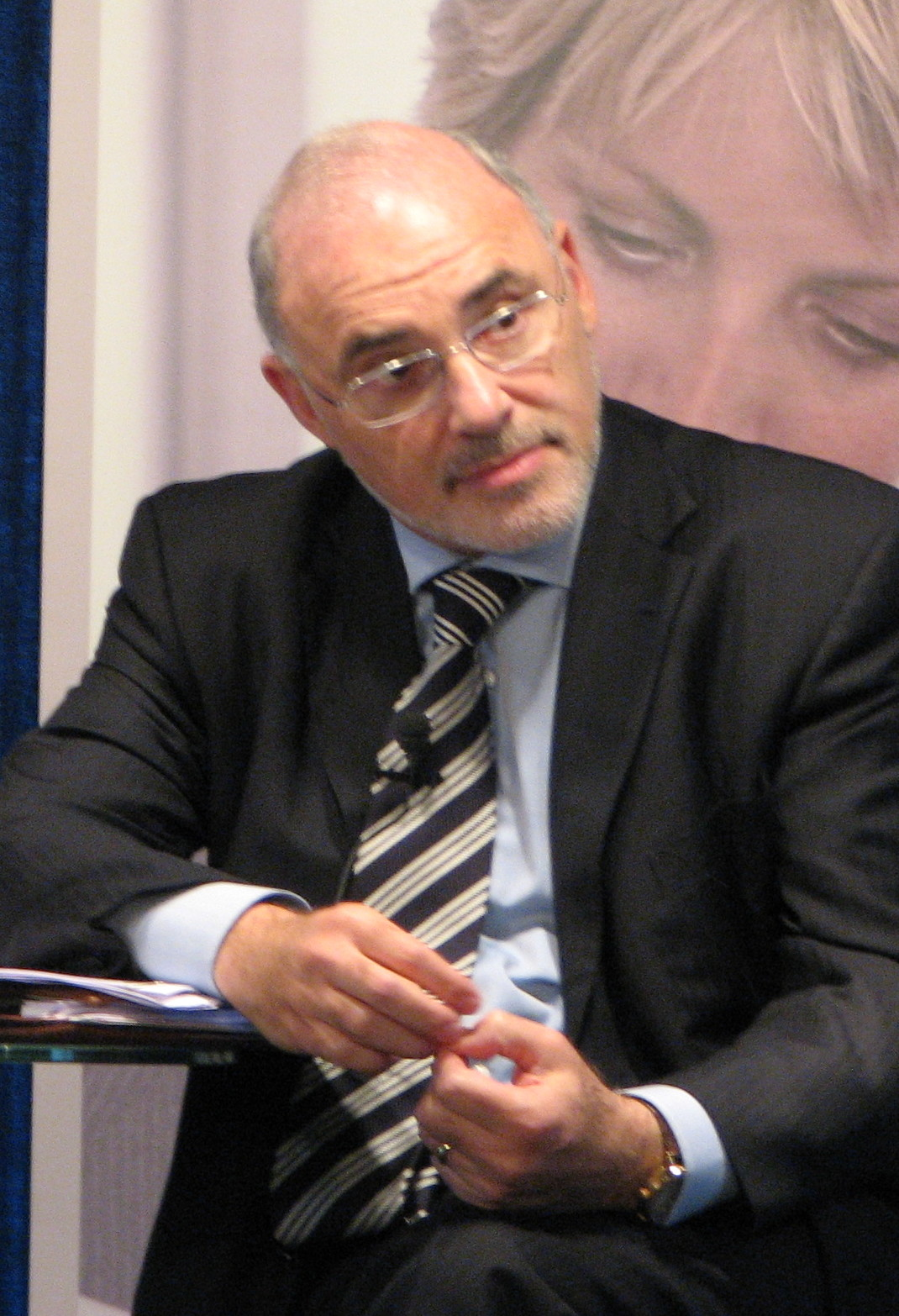
- Born: 18 September 1953 (age 73); Aachen, West Germany
- Education: Hebrew University
- Occupations: Board member, Schneider Electric SA
- Known for: CEO, Hewlett-Packard (2010–2011); CEO, SAP AG (2008–2010)
- Board member of: KMD; Schneider Electric SA; Steria; GT Nexus; PlaNet Finance; UNIT4

Léo Apotheker (born 18 September 1953) is a German business executive. He briefly was the chief executive officer of Hewlett-Packard from November 2010 until his dismissal in September 2011. He was co-chief executive officer of SAP from April 2008 until he resigned in February 2010 following a decision by SAP not to renew his contract.

During his tenure as chief executive at HP, the company lost more than $30 billion in market capitalization after a series of strategic missteps by the company, leading to his resignation. At SAP, which he joined in 1988 and where he spent more than 20 years, he played an instrumental role in developing and implementing a number of significant changes.

Apotheker currently sits on the board of KMD, Schneider Electric SA, Steria, and the non-profit organization PlaNet Finance. He previously served on the board of directors of GT Nexus. Apotheker is fluent in five languages: German, Dutch, French, English and Hebrew.

== Early life and education ==
Apotheker's parents were Polish Jews who fled to the Soviet-Chinese border after the Nazis invaded Poland at the outbreak of World War II. After the war, they settled in Aachen, Germany, where Apotheker was born. He later moved to Antwerp, Belgium.

By his own account, he organized a student strike in high school, and had two of his teeth knocked out by a policeman on horseback in the melee that followed. At the age of 18, he moved to Israel where he studied economics at the Hebrew University in Jerusalem.

== Career ==
=== Early career and SAP: 1988–2010 ===
Prior to joining SAP in 1988, Apotheker held several financial and operations positions at European companies.

After joining SAP, he held positions of increasing responsibility; and in 1995 was promoted to CEO and founder of SAP France and SAP Belgium. Later in 1997, he became the president of SAP's South West Europe region; and by 1999, president of SAP EMEA (Europe, Middle East, and Africa) sales region.

He joined the SAP AG executive board in 2002 and was president of global field operations from 2002 to 2007. He was appointed deputy CEO in 2007, and promoted to co-CEO of the company in April 2008 to ensure a smooth handover from his predecessor, Henning Kagermann, when the latter's contract with the company expired. The succession plan was communicated in the business media early in 2008, including Forbes magazine. The transition received praise as an example of SAP's corporate culture, "a seemingly contradictory mix of internal consensus and competition".

Apotheker's appointment to lead SAP was the second occasion, after 1997 Ron Sommer's appointment as CEO of Deutsche Telekom, that a large German company was run by a Jewish executive whose parents escaped the Holocaust. "If SAP had a pre-war history, I would never have joined the company", he told The Economist.

Apotheker took an early opportunity to set out his vision for the IT industry, and explained enterprise software in layman's terms (likening it to the human nervous system), in an interview with prominent American journalist Charlie Rose. He also articulated SAP's commitment to sustainability.

On 7 February 2010, the SAP supervisory board reached an agreement with Apotheker not to extend his contract as a member of the SAP executive board. With this decision, he stepped down as CEO and resigned from SAP.

=== Hewlett-Packard: 2010–2011 ===
On 30 September 2010, the Board of Directors of Hewlett-Packard announced the election of Apotheker as the company's Chief Executive Officer and President, effective 1 November. He succeeded Cathie Lesjak, who was the company's interim CEO since 6 August, following the abrupt departure of former CEO Mark Hurd. Hurd had been forced to resign after an internal investigation into a sexual harassment claim (that found him not guilty) uncovered expense-account irregularities.

During Apotheker's tenure at HP, the stock dropped about 40%. It dropped nearly 25% on 19 August 2011 after HP announced a number of seemingly abrupt strategic decisions: to discontinue its webOS device business (mobile phones and tablet computers), to begin planning to divest its personal computer division, and to acquire British software firm Autonomy for a significant premium. Over the months following Apotheker's departure, HP eventually spun off the remaining webOS assets into a new subsidiary, Gram; backtracked on any plans to spin off its personal computer division; and wrote-down almost $9 billion related to the Autonomy acquisition, which it indicated was due to a lack of due diligence during the acquisition process under Apotheker.

On 22 September 2011, the HP board of directors replaced Apotheker as chief executive, effective immediately, with fellow board member and former eBay chief Meg Whitman. Though Apotheker was CEO barely ten months, he received over $13 million in compensation: a severance payment of $7.2 million, shares worth $3.56 million, and a performance bonus of $2.4 million, although the company lost more than $30 billion in market capitalization during his tenure.

=== After HP: 2011–present ===
After HP, Apotheker returned to Paris. He, along with some private equity firms in Silicon Valley, are considering investing in mature and distressed companies. In March 2012, he appeared on a conference call, hosted by Nomura Securities analyst Rick Sherlund.

On 1 June 2012, he was appointed as an independent director to board of the Paris-based information technology services provider, Steria.

He sits on the supervisory boards of Schneider Electric SA, Steria, and GT Nexus. He is also a board member of PlaNet Finance, a non-profit organization.

In December 2012, he was appointed Chairman of the board at KMD, a Danish information technology service provider.

In 2014, he joined UNIT4—a Dutch software provider headquartered in the Netherlands—as Non-Executive Chairman of the Board.

In May 2016, he joined Signavio GmbH—a German software provider headquartered in Berlin—as Non-Executive Chairman of the company's Advisory Board.

In 2021, he joined Appway as first independent board member.

In May 2022, Eudonet Group appoints him to its board of directors as chair.

== Personal life ==
Apotheker is married to a Hebrew-speaking Belgian.

== See also ==
- List of Hewlett-Packard executive leadership

Business positions
Preceded by Mark Hurd	Chief Executive Officer of Hewlett-Packard; 2010–2011	Succeeded by Meg Whitman
Preceded by Mark Hurd	President of Hewlett-Packard; 2010–2011	Succeeded by Meg Whitman
