= Telephone Records and Privacy Protection Act of 2006 =

- Nicknames: H109-4709
- Enacted by: the 110th United States Congress
- Effective: January 3, 2007

Legislative history
- Introduced in the House; Signed into law by President George W. Bush on January 3, 2007

The Telephone Records and Privacy Protection Act of 2006 (H109-4709) prohibits pretexting to buy, sell or obtain personal phone records, except when conducted by law enforcement or intelligence agencies. The recent bill threatens up to 10 years in prison to anyone pretending to be someone else, or otherwise employs fraudulent tactics to persuade phone companies to hand over confidential information about their customers.

Before the law was passed, it was only illegal in the United States to use pretexting to obtain financial records about someone via the Gramm-Leach-Bliley Act. In California, it was already illegal to use pretexting to obtain phone records, but most politicians and consumer advocacy groups pleaded for a federal bill to be passed. Sale of the fraudulent material was widespread because the possibility of criminal prosecution was non-existent.

The bill was presented to the President on January 3, 2007.

It is likely that the law was passed at least partially in response to the HP pretexting scandal.

== See also ==
- Gramm-Leach-Bliley Act
