= Safra Catz =

Israeli-American business executive (born 1961)

- צפרא כץ
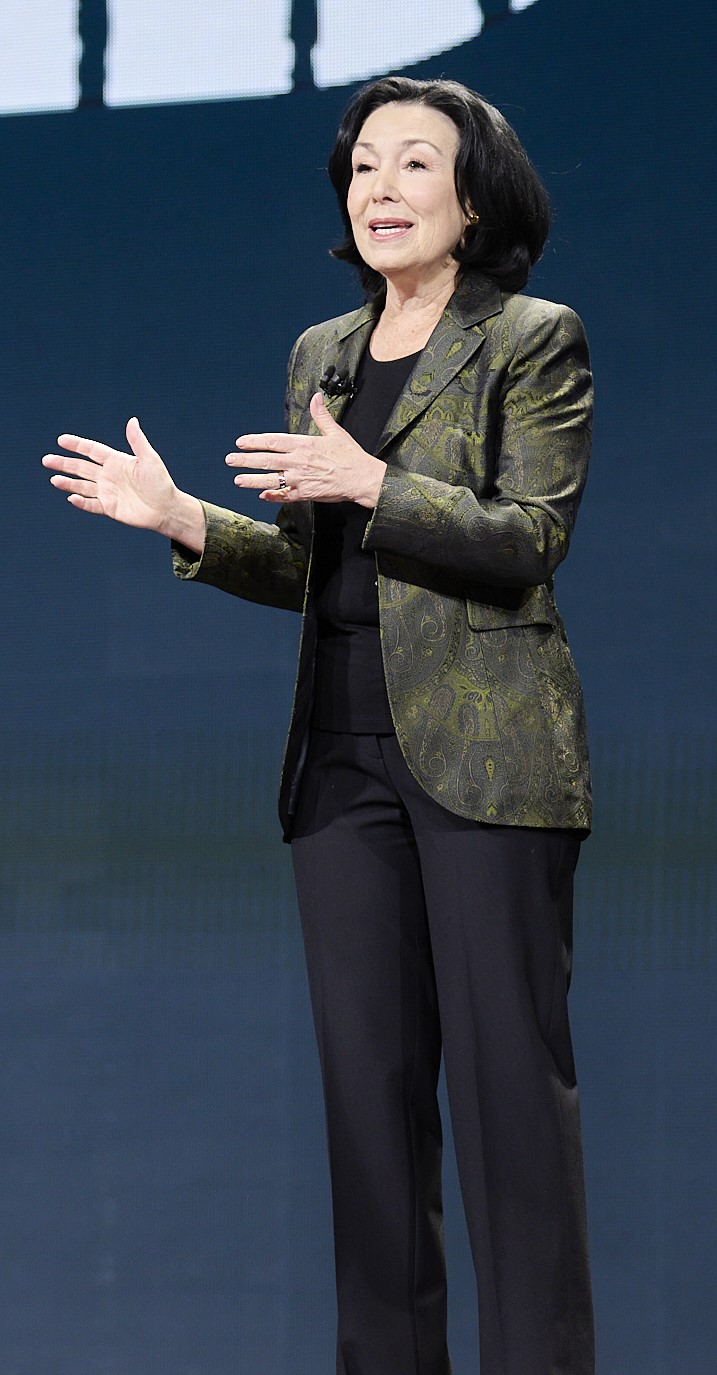
- Safra Catz at Oracle CloudWorld 2024
- Born: Safra Ada Catz; December 1961 (age 64); Holon, Israel
- Citizenship: United States
- Education: University of Pennsylvania (BA, JD)
- Title: Executive vice chair of Oracle
- Spouse: Gal Tirosh (m. 1997)
- Children: 2

Safra Ada Catz (Hebrew: צפרא עדה כץ; born December 1961) is an Israeli-American business executive. She is the executive vice chair and former CEO of Oracle Corporation. She has been an executive at Oracle since April 1999, and a board member since 2001. In April 2011, she was named co-president and chief financial officer (CFO), reporting to founder Larry Ellison. In September 2014, Oracle announced that Ellison would step down as CEO and that Mark Hurd and Catz had been named as joint CEOs. Hurd took a medical leave of absence on September 11, 2019, and died on October 18, 2019. In December 2019, Larry Ellison said Oracle would not name a second CEO, and Catz remained the sole CEO until September 2025.

== Early life ==
Catz was born in December 1961 in Holon, Israel, to Jewish parents. She moved from Israel to Brookline, Massachusetts at the age of six.

Catz graduated from Brookline High School. She earned a bachelor's degree from the Wharton School of the University of Pennsylvania in 1983 and a J.D. from the University of Pennsylvania Law School in 1986.

== Career ==
Catz was a banker at Donaldson, Lufkin & Jenrette, serving as a managing director from February 1997 to March 1999 and a senior vice president from January 1994 to February 1997 and previously held various investment banking positions since 1986. In 1999, Catz joined Oracle as senior vice president. She has been a non-executive director of Oracle subsidiary Hyperion Solutions since April 2007. She has been a member of the executive council of TechNet since March 2013. She was a director of PeopleSoft Inc since December 2004 and Stellent Inc. since December 2006.

Catz joined Oracle Corporation in April 1999. Catz became a member of the company's board of directors in October 2001 and president in early 2004. She is credited for having driven Oracle's 2005 efforts to acquire software rival PeopleSoft in a $10.3 billion takeover. Catz was Oracle's chief financial officer from November 2005 to September 2008, and again from April 2011 to September 2014. Mark Hurd joined her as co-president in 2010. Larry Ellison, founder of Oracle, stepped down as CEO in 2014, and made Mark Hurd co-CEO with Catz. In December 2019, Oracle stated that Catz would be the sole CEO after Hurd's death.

In 2009 she was ranked by Fortune as the 12th most powerful woman in business. In 2009 she was ranked by Forbes as the 16th most powerful businesswoman. She was ranked 24th in 2014 and 17th in 2023. According to an Equilar analysis published by Fortune, she was in 2011 the highest-paid woman among Fortune 1000 companies, receiving an estimated US$51,695,742 in total remuneration.

Catz is a lecturer in accounting at the Stanford Graduate School of Business.

After the election of Donald Trump, Catz was one of several high-profile CEOs, including Tim Cook, Sheryl Sandberg and Jeff Bezos, invited to talk with the then president-elect about potentially taking up a position in the incoming administration. According to Bloomberg, she was considered for the post of U.S. Trade Representative or Director of National Intelligence.

In 2016, Catz was the highest paid female CEO of any US company, earning $40.9 million after a 23% drop in her total compensation relative to 2015. In 2022, Catz's total compensation from Oracle was $138 million, making her the sixth highest paid CEO in the US that year. Oracle's 2026 proxy statement reported her total compensation, as shown in its summary compensation table, as $10.1 million for fiscal 2026, which ended on May 31, 2026, and $1.1 million for fiscal 2025.

In 2017, a litigation case began against Larry Ellison and Catz challenging the acquisitions in 2016 of NetSuite by Oracle for $9.4 billion. According to the accusations Catz and Ellison had misled the Oracle Special Committee at the time. On 21 January 2025, the Delaware Supreme Court affirmed a lower-court judgement in favor of Oracle's directors, including Catz and Ellison, holding that the transaction had been negotiated and approved by a fully empowered special committee of independent directors.

In March 2021 Catz garnered attention for her stock trading, for acquiring 2.25 million shares through the conversion of derivatives, before selling them on the open market at roughly double the price.

In March 2022 she was appointed to the Homeland Security Advisory Council by Secretary of Homeland Security Alejandro Mayorkas

She was ranked 11th on Fortune's list of Most Powerful Women in 2023. Catz was ranked 17th on the Forbes Worlds Most Powerful Women 2024. In August 2025, Catz had a net worth of $3.1 billion and ranked 15th on Forbes' list of America's Richest Self-Made Women 2025.

In August 2025, she joined the board of Paramount Skydance, following the merger of the Paramount Global and Skydance Media.

Catz transitioned to the role of executive vice chair at Oracle in September 2025 and was succeeded by co-CEOs Clay Magouyrk and Mike Sicilia.

In 2026, Catz was appointed to the President's Council of Advisors on Science and Technology (PCAST) by President Donald Trump.

== Board memberships ==
Catz served on the board of HSBC from 2008 until the end of 2015. She was elected to the board of directors of The Walt Disney Company in December 2017, serving on the board effective February 2018 until July 2024.

In August 2025, Catz joined the board of Paramount Skydance, following the merger of the Paramount Global and Skydance Media. She also serves as a trustee of In-Q-Tel, a non-profit strategic investor supporting US national security agencies.

== Political involvement ==
During the 2016 Republican presidential primaries, Catz donated to the campaign of Marco Rubio. Following Donald Trump's victory in the 2016 election, Catz was named as a member of his transition team. During this period, media outlets frequently mentioned her as a potential appointee to a position in the Trump administration. Bloomberg News reported that these included the positions of Director of National Intelligence and United States Trade Representative.

In 2018, she was reportedly on the shortlist to replace H. R. McMaster as National Security Advisor. During the 2018 election cycle, Catz donated over $150,000 to Republican-aligned groups and individuals, including Congressman Devin Nunes. Together with her spouse, Catz contributed $250,000 to Donald Trump's 2020 presidential campaign. Catz was a member of the National Security Commission on Artificial Intelligence (NSCAI) that was established in 2018 and issued its final report in March 2021.

== Personal life ==
Catz has been married to Gal Tirosh, a former soccer coach, since 1997. They have two sons. She resides in Fort Lauderdale, Florida.
