= Security BSides =

Information security conference

BSides
- Genre: Security conferences
- Location: Worldwide
- Inaugurated: 2009
- Founders: Mike Dahn, Jack Daniel, Chris Nickerson
- Website: bsides.org

BSides (also known as Security BSides) is a series of loosely affiliated information security conferences.

== Background ==
The event, named after the "B-side" of a vinyl record, is a worldwide security conference organised by different community groups in their local areas. It began in 2009 with a number of rejected presentations from Black Hat USA.

Over time the conference format matured and was released to enable individuals to start their own BSides conferences. The Las Vegas BSides conference is also considered part of Hacker Summer Camp given its schedule and proximity to other security conferences during that time.

== History ==
BSides was co-founded by Mike Dahn, Jack Daniel, and Chris Nickerson in 2009. Due to an overwhelming number of presentation submissions to Black Hat USA in 2009, some talks could not fit in the schedule and were rejected by the organisers. The rejected presentations were presented to a smaller group of individuals at the first BSides conference. The first event was quickly organised by grassroots groups made from those who had their talks rejected, and has been praised for allowing for more perspectives and conversations when compared with the larger conferences.

BSides was organized in a style similar to an unconference in its inaugural year, with talks selected immediately prior to the event through an online community-driven process. Every year since, the speaker lineup has been scheduled in advance through a formal RfP process, and published by the organizers ahead of time.

In 2010, BSides expanded to Berlin, Ottawa, Dallas, Delaware, Atlanta, Kansas City, Denver, Boston, Austin, and San Francisco. The first BSides event in the United Kingdom was in London in 2011, in the same year over 40 events took place globally.

In 2022, BSides Cleveland was criticised for booking Chris Hadnagy who was previously banned by DEF CON for undisclosed misconduct claims. Hadnagy was a surprise speaker, and not revealed until his talk began. The decision resulted in a number of experts withdrawing from the event, and the organiser of the event stepped down and was replaced by a four-person team supported by BSides central organisers.

== See also ==
- Hacker conference
- Black Hat
- DEF CON
- Kiwicon
- Summercon
