= Christopher Hadnagy =

American information security consultant

Christopher J. Hadnagy
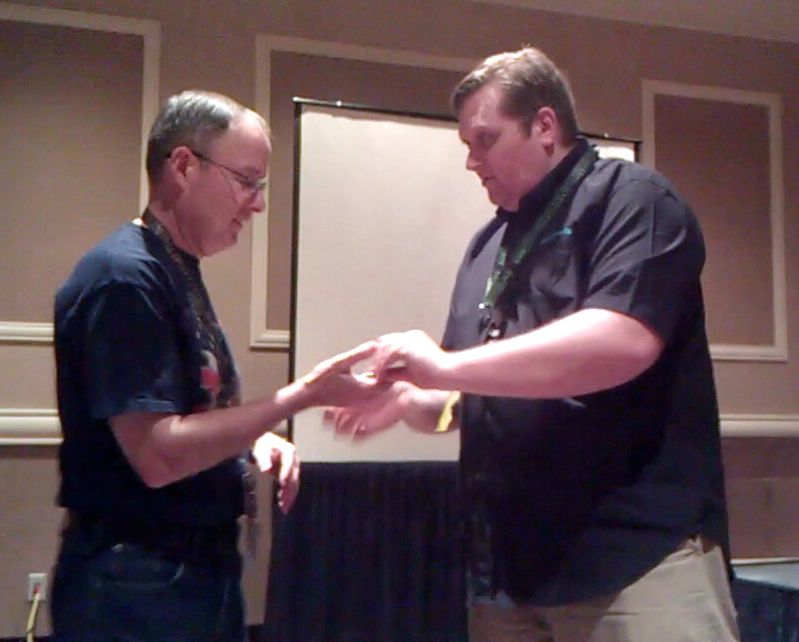
- General Keith Alexander (left) offers Chris Hadnagy the NSA Director's challenge coin at DEF CON 20
- Born: Christopher James Hadnagy
- Occupations: Information technology consultant, author
- Organization(s): Innocent Lives Foundation, Social-Engineer, LLC
- Website: www.social-engineer.com

Christopher James Hadnagy is an American author and information security consultant. He specializes in social engineering and founded a company that provides related services and training. He has also taught classes and written books on the topic. He established the Innocent Lives Foundation, which aims to protect children by identifying online predators and providing information about them to law enforcement agencies. He coordinated educational events at DEF CON about social engineering for several years. In 2022, the DEF CON organizers banned him from the conference based on reports of code of conduct violations. He denied wrongdoing and in 2022 sued the organizers for defamation; the suit was dismissed with prejudice in 2025.

== Career ==
Hadnagy is the founder and CEO of Social-Engineer LLC, a company that provides consulting and training related to social engineering. The company's services include penetration testing using social engineering techniques. He established Social-Engineer.Org, an IT security education website. Hadnagy has developed a social engineering framework, published a newsletter, and hosted a podcast focused on the subject. In 2021–2022, he was an adjunct professor at the University of Arizona College of Applied Science and Technology.

He was previously the operations manager at a security training company, Offensive Security. Before that, he worked in sales consulting, sales training, and technology services.

=== Charitable foundation ===
In 2017, Hadnagy founded the Innocent Lives Foundation (ILF), which has a goal of protecting children from online predators by identifying people who produce or trade child sexual abuse material. Staff and volunteers use open-source intelligence to gather information, and give it to law enforcement agencies in the United States. Hadnagy said in 2018 that the work had led to two arrests. In 2021, Vice reported that the Innocent Lives Foundation sold a set of Network Investigative Techniques, hacking tools for identifying anonymous individuals, to the FBI for $250,000. ILF also works to educate parents and guardians about preventing grooming and abuse of children.

=== Conferences ===
Hadnagy contributed to DEF CON by helping create a social engineering capture the flag competition in 2009. He ran this competition and coordinated other social engineering education activities at the annual conference for several years. In 2021, he presented at Security BSides in Idaho Falls, Idaho, on the topic of cancel culture.

=== DEF CON ban and lawsuit ===
The organizers of DEF CON permanently banned Hadnagy in February 2022 for code of conduct violations, a decision he publicly disputed. Hadnagy was previously a member of the review board for the Black Hat conference, and he left or was removed from the board after DEF CON published its ban. In June 2022, Security BSides in Cleveland, Ohio, featured Hadnagy as an unlisted speaker. Controversy surrounding his participation led to several other speakers withdrawing from the event, and the event organizer apologized and resigned.

Hadnagy sued DEF CON in August 2022 for harm to his reputation. In the course of litigation, specific details of the alleged misconduct were made public, including allegations from over a dozen people claiming a pattern of verbal abuse, outbursts of anger, and sexual harassment of female coworkers. In 2025 the judge in the case dismissed Hadnagy's suit with prejudice because he could not prove that the statements made about him had been false.

== Books ==
- Social Engineering: The Art of Human Hacking (2010, Wiley Publishing, Inc.) ISBN 978-0-470-63953-5
  - Second edition: Social Engineering: The Science of Human Hacking (2018, John Wiley & Sons Inc.) ISBN 978-1-119-43338-5
- Unmasking the Social Engineer: The Human Element of Security (2014, John Wiley & Sons, Inc.) ISBN 978-1-118-60857-9
- Phishing Dark Waters: The Offensive and Defensive Sides of Malicious E-mails (2015, John Wiley & Sons Inc.), co-authored with Michele Fincher ISBN 978-1-118-95847-6
- Human Hacking: Win Friends, Influence People, and Leave Them Better Off for Having Met You (2021, Harper Business) ISBN 978-0-063-00178-7
