= Patricia C. Dunn =

American businesswoman and executive (1953–2011)

- Born: March 27, 1953; Burbank, California, U.S.
- Died: December 4, 2011 (aged 58); Orinda, California, U.S.
- Other names: Pat Dunn, Patricia Cecile Dunn-Jahnke
- Education: University of California, Berkeley (BA)
- Spouse: William Jahnke
- Children: 3

Patricia C. Dunn (March 27, 1953 – December 4, 2011) was the non-executive chairman of the board of Hewlett-Packard (HP) from February 2005 until September 22, 2006, when she resigned her position.

On October 4, 2006, Bill Lockyer, the California attorney general, charged Dunn with four felonies for her role in the HP spying scandal. Some members of the press reported that Dunn had been scapegoated. On March 14, 2007, California Superior Court Judge Ray Cunningham dismissed the charges against her.

== Early life ==
Born in Burbank, California, Dunn grew up in Las Vegas, Nevada, where both her parents were involved in the casino industry. Her father was the entertainment manager for the Dunes and Tropicana hotel-casinos, and her mother was a model and entertainer. When Dunn was only eleven, her father died. Her mother subsequently moved the family to California.

== Education ==
After graduating from Terra Linda High School in 1970, Dunn entered the University of Oregon, but dropped out to support her mother by working as a housecleaner. She resumed college and graduated from UC Berkeley in 1975 with a B.A. in Journalism.

== Career ==
After college Dunn began working as a temporary secretary at Wells Fargo & Co. She eventually became CEO at Barclays Global Investors, the company that acquired the asset management division of Wells Fargo. In 1998 she joined the HP Board of Directors. In 2001 the Financial Women of San Francisco named Dunn the "Financial Woman of the Year".

Dunn became non-executive chair of the HP board in February 2005 when Carly Fiorina, the CEO and chair of the HP board, left the company. Dunn was also non-executive Vice Chairman of Barclays Global Investors from 2002 to October 2006. Additionally, she was Director and Executive Committee member of Larkin Street Youth Services in San Francisco, on the board of the Conference Board's Global Corporate Governance Research Center, and an advisory board member of UC Berkeley Haas School of Business.

=== Scandal ===
Dunn was at the center of the 2006 HP Spying Scandal because she directed investigations of board-level leaks of information to reporters in 2005–2006. HP hired companies which, while investigating the leaks, obtained the personal telephone records of HP board members and reporters who covered HP through a practice called pretexting. It is illegal under California law to use deceit and trickery to obtain private records of individuals.

HP announced on September 12, 2006, that Mark Hurd (the company's CEO) would replace Dunn as Chairman in January but she would continue as a board member. Ten days later, however, Dunn resigned (effective immediately) both from her position as chairman and from the board. In an official statement, Dunn noted "I accepted the responsibility to identify the sources of those leaks, but I did not propose the specific methods of the investigation ... Unfortunately, the people HP relied upon to conduct this type of investigation let me and the company down. I continue to have the best interests of HP at heart and thus I have accepted the board's request to resign."

On October 4, 2006, Dunn and four others were charged by California attorney general Bill Lockyer with four felony counts: fraudulent use of wire, radio or television transmissions; taking, copying, and using computer data without authorization; identity theft; and conspiracy. Lockyer issued arrest warrants for all five of those so charged. Dunn was scheduled to have been arraigned on November 17, 2006.

On March 14, 2007, the judge in the case dropped all criminal charges against her in the "interests of justice". The dropping of the criminal charges by Judge Cunningham came after Dunn refused to take a plea of one misdemeanor in exchange for four felonies before the preliminary hearing.

== Personal life ==
Dunn married William Jahnke, a former head of Wells Fargo Investment Advisors. The couple owned a winery in Australia, a home in Hawaii, and a home in Orinda, California.

Having survived breast and skin cancer, Dunn was diagnosed in January 2004 with advanced ovarian cancer. Chemotherapy led to remission until August 2006, when she underwent surgery to remove liver metastases. On December 4, 2011, she died at home in Orinda – survived by her husband, three adult children, ten grandchildren, a brother, and a sister – at age 58.

Business positions
Preceded by Carly Fiorina	Chairman of Hewlett-Packard; 2005–2006	Succeeded by Mark Hurd
