= Robert Wayman =

Robert P. Wayman (July 5, 1945 – July 22, 2022) was the chief financial officer (CFO) of the Hewlett-Packard Company from 1984 to 2006. He served as the company's interim CEO in 2005, and was an executive vice president, as well as a member of the H-P board of directors. He died on July 22, 2022.

== Early life and education ==
Wayman was a Chicago native. He attended Northwestern University in Evanston, Illinois, where he graduated with a bachelor's degree in science engineering and a Master of Business Administration.

== Career ==
Robert Wayman joined the Hewlett-Packard Company in 1969 as a cost accountant at its Loveland, Colorado office, after a few years he moved to the company's headquarters at Palo Alto, California, where he held a number of finance positions before he was appointed as the company's CFO in 1984, he then reported to former CEO John Young. He served on the company's board of directors from 1993 to 2002, and rejoined the board in 2005.

In February 2005, he was appointed an interim CEO, following Carly Fiorina departure as a result of pressures from the board of directors; Wayman retained his finance responsibilities, and served in the top executive role until Mark Hurd assumed the position in March 2005. The board of directors approved a $3 million bonus for his 52-day service as CEO, an unusual payout, that led to questions by some corporate governance experts and employees, but was defended by the company.

On December 11, 2006, after 37 years with the company, Robert Wayman announced his retirement, which became effective on December 31. He was succeeded by Cathie Lesjak. In a Financial Times interview, Wayman said he began to plan for retirement since 2002 but reiterated due to the company's controversial deal to acquire Compaq.

Wayman joined the Santa Clara-based Affymetrix board of directors on March 19, 2007, until it was acquired by Thermo Fisher Scientific in 2016. He was a board member of Sybase, until it was sold in 2010. He also served as director in other corporation boards, including Con-Way Inc., and CareFusion.

He served on the board of the nonprofit V Foundation for Cancer Research. He was a member of the Advisory Board to Northwestern University's Kellogg School of Management.

Business positions
Preceded by Carly Fiorina	Chief Executive Officer of Hewlett-Packard; 2005	Succeeded by Mark Hurd
