= Marble Boat =

Structure in Beijing, China

Coordinates: 39°59′48.4″N 116°15′48.9″E

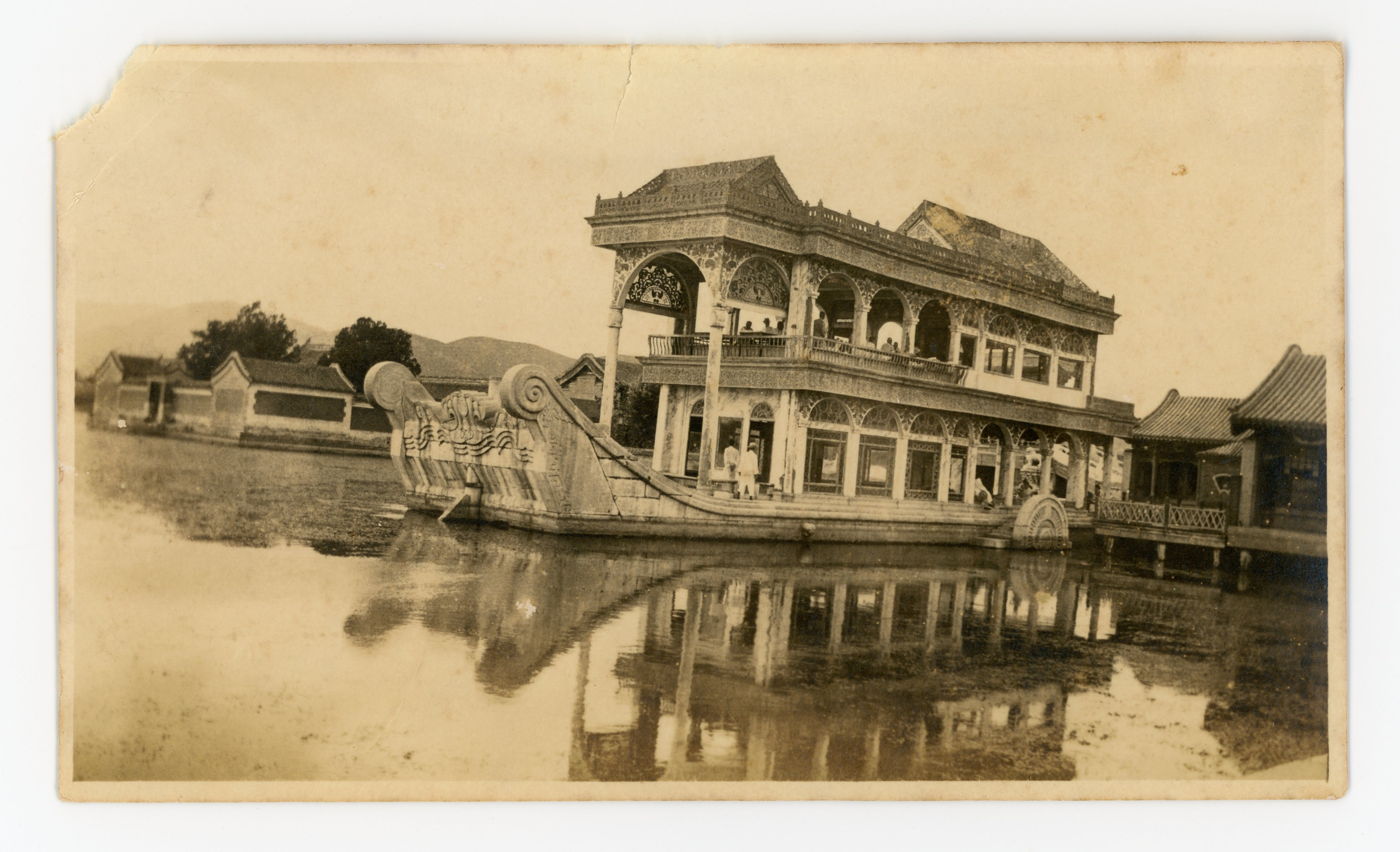
Marble Boat (1926)

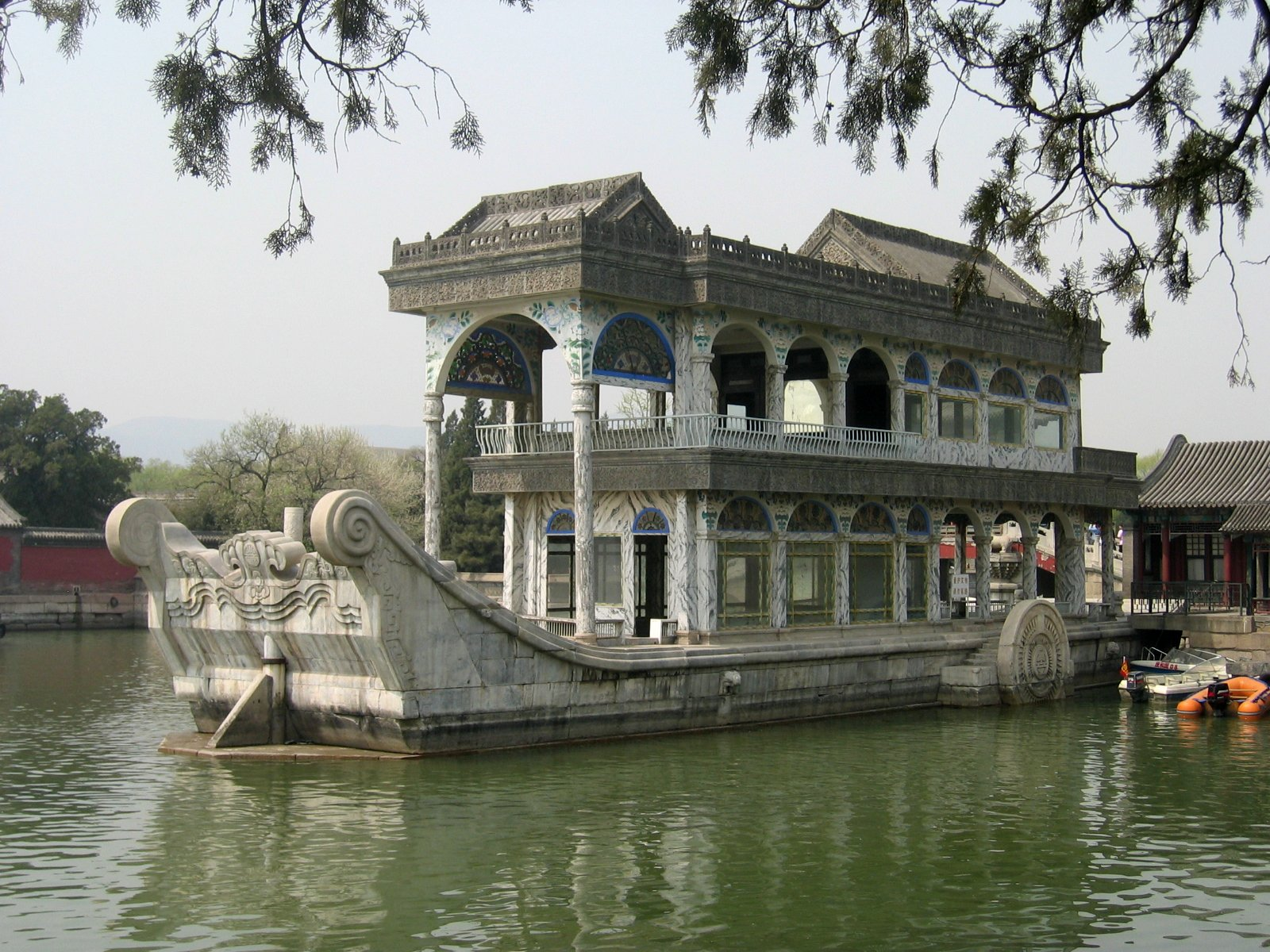
Marble Boat

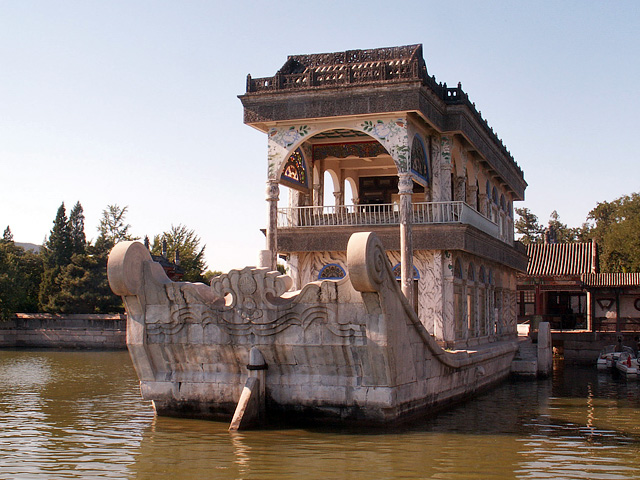
View from the bow

The Marble Boat (Chinese: 石舫; pinyin: Shí Fǎng), also known as the Boat of Purity and Ease, is a lakeside pavilion on the grounds of the Summer Palace in Beijing, China.

It was first erected in 1755 during the reign of the Qianlong Emperor. The original pavilion was made from a base of large stone blocks which supported a wooden superstructure done in a traditional Chinese design.

In 1860, during the Second Opium War, the pavilion was burnt on the orders of Lord Elgin. It was restored in 1893 on order of Empress Dowager Cixi. In this restoration, a new two-story superstructure was designed which incorporated elements of European architecture. Like its predecessor, the new superstructure is made out of wood but it was painted to imitate marble. On each "deck", there is a large mirror to reflect the waters of the lake and give an impression of total immersion in the aquatic environment. Imitation paddlewheels on each side of the pavilion make it look like a paddle steamer. The pavilion has a sophisticated drainage system which channels rainwater through four hollow pillars, which is finally released into the lake through the mouths of four dragonheads.

The boat design of the pavilion may relate to a quote attributed to Wei Zheng, a Tang dynasty chancellor. He is said to have told Emperor Taizong that "the waters that float the boat can also capsize it", implying that the Chinese people can not only support an emperor, but can also topple him. With this in mind, the Qianlong Emperor might have chosen to construct the Marble Boat as an auspicious symbol of a stable reign.

The Marble Boat is often seen as an ironic commentary on the fact that the money used to restore the Summer Palace largely came from funds originally earmarked for building up a new imperial navy. The controller of the Admiralty, Prince Chun, owed much of his social standing as well as his appointment to Empress Dowager Cixi, who had adopted his eldest son, Zaitian, who was enthroned as the Guangxu Emperor. Because of this, he probably saw no other choice than to condone the embezzlement.

The pavilion is 36 meters (118 ft) in length and stands on the northwestern shore of Kunming Lake, near the western end of the Long Corridor.
