= Quark Pharmaceuticals =

Israeli pharmaceutical company

Quark Pharmaceuticals, Inc.
- Type: Private
- Industry: Pharmaceuticals
- Founded: 1993
- Founder: Daniel Zurr
- Headquarters: Ness Ziona, Israel
- Key people: Gal Cohen, CEO
- Number of employees: +3 (2021)
- Website: www.quarkpharma.com

Quark Pharmaceuticals is a pharmaceutical company that develops RNA interference-based treatments for chronic and acute diseases.

== History highlights ==
- On October 1, 2017, Quark closed up operations.
- Establishes a Chinese joint venture with Suzhuo and raises RMB45 million for the joint venture. The JV will develop QPI-1007 for China and other markets.
- Enters into a license and collaboration agreement with Biocon Ltd. To develop QPI-1007 for India and other key markets.
- Reports results for PF-655 (formerly PF-04523655 or RTP801I-14) from a Phase II trial in patients with diabetic macular edema.
- Enters into a licensing option agreement with Novartis to obtain exclusive worldwide rights to QPI-1002.
- Closes $27 million financing with SBI Holdings, Inc., of Japan.
- In August 2007, Medical News Today announced that Quark obtained positive preclinical results of systemic RNAi compound for acute kidney injury. The study showed that rats that were treated with the injection of Quark's siRNA AKIi-5, which inhibits the gene P53, where significantly protected from ischemia/reperfusion-induced acute kidney injury compared to the ones that were not treated. The result showed a favorable safety profile for the drug with a therapeutic index in rats greater than 250.
- Quark Pharmaceutical signed a collaboration agreement with the University of Michigan for the development of proprietary SiRNA for noise-induced hearing loss. The collaboration includes studies on different SiRNA candidate drugs inhibiting Quark's proprietary target genes for the prevention and treatment of hearing loss caused by acoustic trauma. The studies will assess delivery efficacy of SiRNA compounds to cochlear cells in the inner ear.
- Quark and Pfizer signed a collaboration agreement where Quark granted Pfizer the rights to develop and commercialize drug candidates that inhibit Quark's target gene RTP801 through RNAi.
- Since 2005, Quark also holds a collaboration with the Center for Hearing & Deafness of the University of New York at Buffalo. The focus of the collaboration is to analyze the effect of Quark's SiRNA drug candidate in preventing chemotherapy induced hearing loss.
- In 2005, Quark licensed the phase II of compound BT16 to Sanwa for the treatment of dyslipidemia.
- In 2004, peer-reviewed journal Oncogene reported that Quark discovered the role of gene Ero-1L alpha in protein secretion under hypoxic condition. This finding suggested that by inhibiting this gene, a therapeutic effect could be obtained in the treatment of cancer and other pathologies involving hypoxia.
