= Mark Hurd =

American businessman (1957–2019)

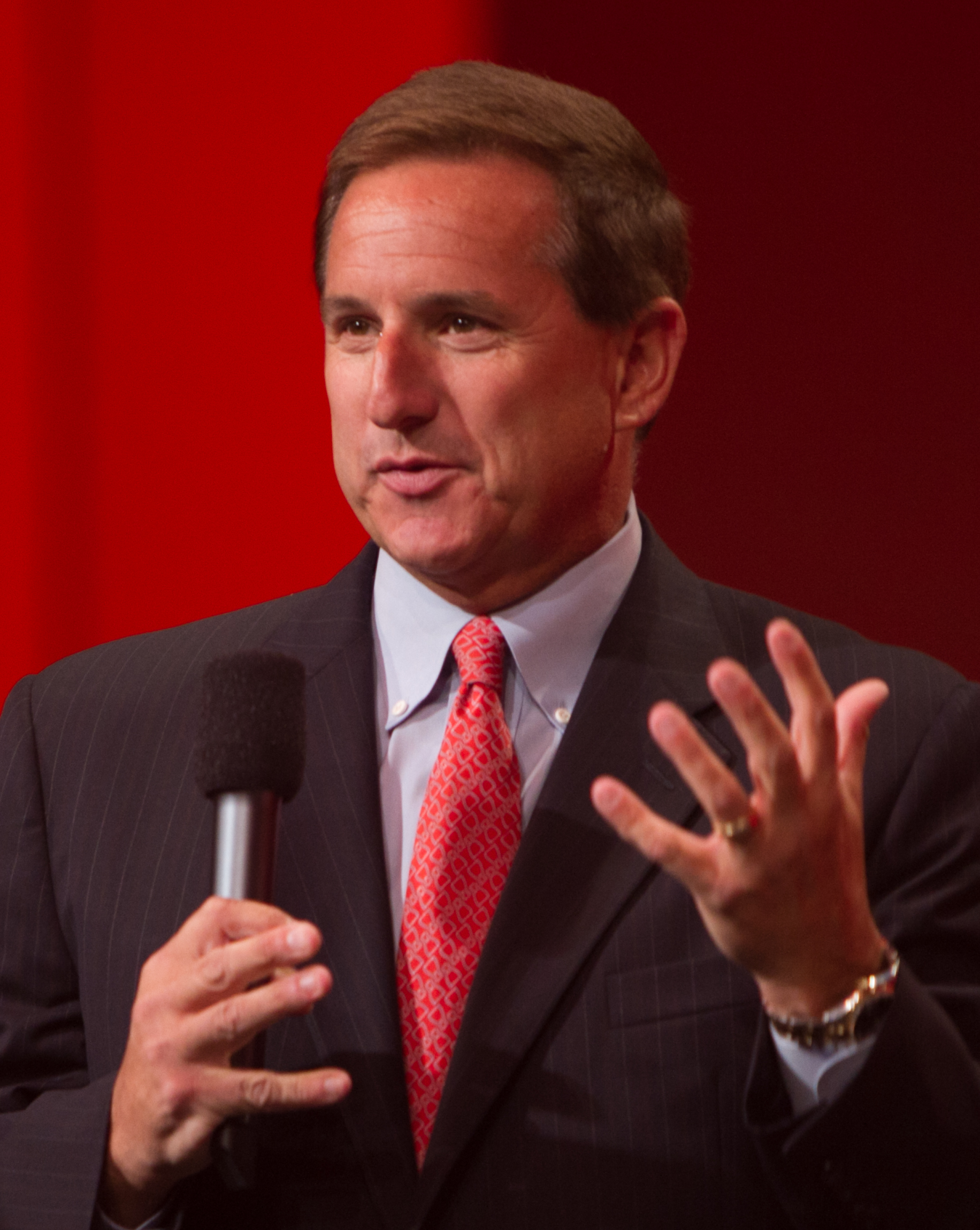
- Hurd at Oracle in 2010
- Born: Mark Vincent Hurd; January 1, 1957; New York City, U.S.
- Died: October 18, 2019 (aged 62)
- Education: Baylor University
- Occupation: Business executive
- Title: Co-CEO of Oracle Corporation
- Spouses: Elizabeth Butler (m. 1980; div. 1987) Paula Kalupa (m. 1990)
- Children: 2

Mark Vincent Hurd (January 1, 1957 – October 18, 2019) was an American businessman who was CEO of Oracle Corporation. Prior to that, he was CEO of NCR Corporation until 2005, then served as chairman, chief executive officer and president of Hewlett-Packard until 2010. He also served on the board of directors of Globality and a member of the Technology CEO Council and board of directors of News Corporation until 2010.

== Early life and education ==
Hurd was born in New York City, the son of Teresa A. (Fanoni), a debutante and Ralph Steiner Hurd, a financier. He graduated from The Browning School, in NYC in 1974. In 1979, Hurd graduated with a Bachelor of Business Administration from Baylor University in Waco, Texas. He received a tennis scholarship to attend Baylor University and was a member of Phi Delta Theta.

== Career ==
=== NCR (1980–2005) ===
Hurd spent 25 years at NCR Corporation, culminating in a two-year tenure as chief executive officer and president. He was named president of NCR in 2001 and was given additional responsibilities as chief operating officer (COO) in 2002. He began working for NCR as a junior salesman in San Antonio in 1980 after Rodney Gray hired him and subsequently held a variety of positions in general management, operations, and sales and marketing. He also was head of the company's Teradata data-warehousing division for three years.

=== Hewlett-Packard (2005–2010) ===
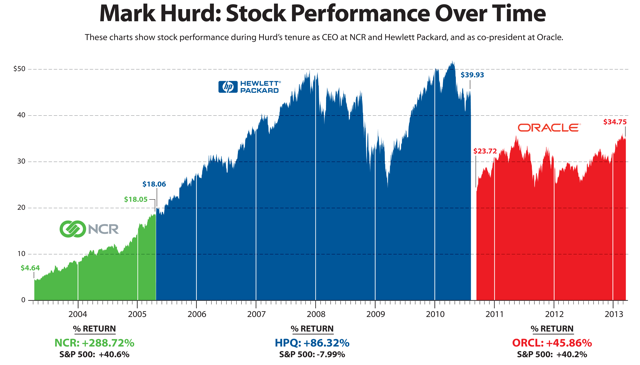
This chart shows the share price of NCR, Hewlett-Packard and Oracle during Mark Hurd's tenure.

After the board forced chairman and CEO Carly Fiorina to resign in January 2005 over policy differences following the Compaq merger, executive vice president and CFO Robert P. Wayman became interim CEO for several months. Hurd was appointed permanent CEO and also held the title of President, a post which was not used by several of his predecessors (Michael Capellas was President of HP for a transitional period in 2002 after its merger with Compaq).

Hurd was also elected to the board of directors but unlike previous CEOs, he was initially not designated to be chairman of the board which was instead filled by a non-executive director. On September 22, 2006, Hurd succeeded Pat Dunn as board chairman after she resigned due to the pretexting controversy.

During his leadership, the company became the leader of the sale of laptop computers in 2006, and the leader in the sale of desktop computers in 2007. In 2008, it increased its market share in inkjet printers and laser printers to 46% and 50.5%, respectively. In March 2009, Hurd forecast that HP's sales could drop as much as 5% that year, in the midst of the recession, but that its profit would increase by nearly 6%. Under Hurd's tenure, the company met Wall Street expectations in 21 out of 22 quarters and increased profits for 22 straight quarters, while its revenue rose 63% and stock price doubled.

While the merger of Hewlett-Packard and Compaq was heavily criticized back in 2002, Hurd managed to make the combined company execute successfully, something his predecessor Fiorina had failed to do. The New York Times said Hurd had "pulled off one of the great rescue missions in American corporate history, refocusing the strife-ridden company and leading it to five years of revenue gains and a stock that soared 130 percent".

Hurd was said to have run HP "with a founder's authority. He was the de facto CEO, CFO, COO and head salesman". Hurd had a reputation for aggressive cost-cutting. He laid off 15,200 workers — 10% of the workforce — shortly after becoming CEO. Other cost-cutting included reducing the IT department from 19,000 to 8,000, reducing the number of software applications that HP used from 6,000 to 1,500, and consolidating HP's 85 data centers to 6.

In 2007, while chairman and CEO at Hewlett-Packard, Hurd was named one of Fortune Magazine's 25 most powerful people in business. In 2008, The San Francisco Chronicle named Hurd as CEO of the year. In 2009, Hurd was listed as one of Forbes' top gun CEOs.

In 2008, Hurd's total compensation was $39,952,237, including a base salary of $1,450,000, stock award of $7,907,660, cash bonus of $23,931,882, and $662,695 in perquisites and other compensation. It was the largest bonus of any CEO in 2008. In 2009, Hurd made a total of $24,201,448, including a base salary of $1,268,750, stock award of $6,648,092, cash bonus of $15,809,414 and $475,192 in benefits and other compensation.

On August 6, 2010, Hurd resigned from all of his positions at HP, with the Board of Directors appointing CFO Cathie Lesjak as interim CEO. Hurd's decision was made after an investigation into whether Hurd violated HP's code of business conduct following claims made by former contractor Jodie Fisher. The investigation concluded that the company's sexual-harassment policy was not violated, but in the course of investigating the allegations, they found that Hurd had submitted inaccurate expense reports. Outside observers suggested the company's board of directors had made a poor decision and may have had mixed motives in requiring his resignation in order to mitigate negative publicity. Fisher herself expressed regrets at the outcome.

=== Oracle Corporation (2010–2019) ===
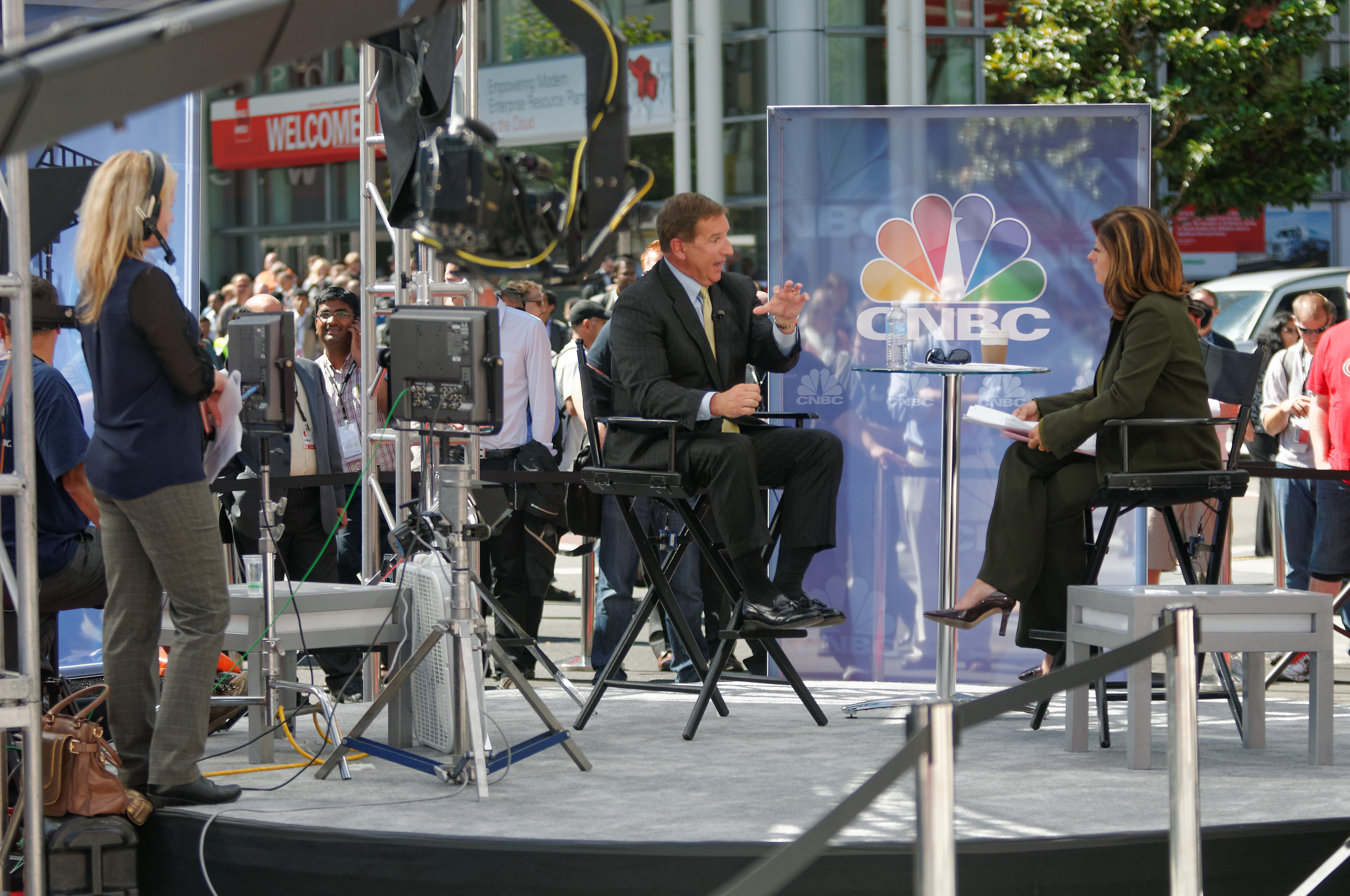
Hurd talking with Maria Bartiromo in 2013

On September 6, 2010, Hurd was named president of Oracle Corporation alongside Safra A. Catz, succeeding former president Charles Phillips. Hurd was also appointed a member of the Oracle Corporation board of directors. Hurd and Catz were appointed by then-CEO Larry Ellison. HP then sued Hurd, claiming he would violate agreements to protect HP's secrets by assuming that high-level role at Oracle; the lawsuit was settled two weeks later, with Hurd giving up about half the compensation owed him by HP.

Hurd revamped the company's sales department in 2013, a process that had initially started two years prior. Hurd changed the compensation for Oracle's salespeople in order to sell more hardware, hired additional salespeople, and reduced the number of accounts covered by each salesman. In April 2013, he reported that the number of salespeople had increased by 4,000. His plans to revamp initially faced flak from veteran salespeople, some of whom left Oracle to work for competitors.

In 2013, Hurd launched the “Class Of” program to hire thousands of college graduates to become salespeople, helping sell Oracle's cloud. As a result of the program's success and plans for expansion, the company built a new campus in Austin, Texas, to house employees part of Hurd's "Class Of" program.

On September 18, 2014, Ellison announced he was stepping down as CEO of Oracle, with Hurd and Catz becoming co-CEOs. Hurd was given control of sales, service, and marketing departments, while Catz was to oversee operations, legal, and finance departments.

Under Hurd, Oracle accelerated its focus on cloud technology and modernized its legacy software to compete with smaller cloud-based firms. In 2016, Hurd said that Oracle's cloud business had grown 82% between 2015 and 2016 as well as invested $5.1 billion into research and development in improving its cloud services.

Oracle acquired several cloud-based companies in 2016 under Hurd, including SaaS enterprise resource planning company NetSuite, Textura cloud services for the engineering and construction vertical, cloud-based warehouse management application company LogFire, and Opower, a provider of cloud services to the utilities industry.

== Personal life ==
Mark Hurd married Elizabeth A. Butler on August 23, 1980; they divorced on October 14, 1987. Hurd and his second wife, Paula Kalupa, an executive with NCR, married in 1990. They had two daughters, Kathryn and Kelly.

In September 2019, Hurd announced his intention to go on leave for unspecified health reasons. Hurd died on October 18, 2019, reportedly of cancer.

== Bibliography ==
- The Value Factor: How Global Leaders Use Information for Growth and Competitive Advantage by Mark Hurd and Lars Nyberg, Bloomberg Press, 2004, ISBN 1-57660-157-9
- Fall 2003 Baylor Business Review "Enterprise Decision-Making" by Mark Hurd, ISSN 0739-1072

Business positions
Preceded by Patricia C. Dunn	Chairman of Hewlett-Packard; 2006–2010	Succeeded by Ray Lane
Preceded by Robert Wayman	Chief Executive Officer of Hewlett-Packard; 2005–2010	Succeeded by Léo Apotheker
Preceded by Carly Fiorina	President of Hewlett-Packard; 2005–2010	Succeeded by Léo Apotheker
Preceded by Charles Phillips; Safra A. Catz	Co-President of Oracle Corporation (along with Safra A. Catz); 2010–2019	Succeeded by Safra A. Catz
