= Susan Packard Orr =

American philanthropist

- Education: Stanford University (BA, MBA); New Mexico Tech (MS)
- Employer: Telosa Software
- Known for: David and Lucile Packard Foundation, Lucile Packard Children's Hospital
- Spouse: Franklin Orr
- Parent(s): David Packard, Lucile Salter Packard
- Relatives: David Woodley Packard, Nancy Burnett, Julie Packard

Susan Packard Orr is an American philanthropist and the former chair of the Board of Directors of the David and Lucile Packard Foundation. In addition to the Packard Foundation, she is a current or previous board member of several prominent nonprofit organizations including Stanford University and the Lucile Packard Children's Hospital at Stanford. She also served on the Hewlett-Packard board for 7 years (1993–2001), leaving shortly before the Compaq merger. Orr currently is founder and CEO of Telosa Software. She holds Economics and MBA degrees from Stanford, and a master's degree in computer science from New Mexico Tech.

== Personal ==
Orr is the daughter of David Packard and Lucile Salter Packard. Like both of them, she attended Stanford University, where she graduated with a BA in economics (1968) and an MBA (1970). After spending time as an economist at the National Institutes of Health, she obtained a master's degree in computer science from New Mexico Tech. She is married to Franklin Orr, who was Under Secretary of Energy for Science in the Obama administration, and is a professor emeritus at Stanford.

== Philanthropy ==
Orr joined the Board of Directors of the David and Lucile Packard Foundation at age 21 along with her three siblings, and was appointed chairman of the board in 1996 after David Packard's death.

Orr also has served on the board of trustees of the Lucile Packard Children's Hospital at Stanford since it was founded in 1991, including serving as vice-chair.

Other nonprofit boards that Orr has served on include the Audubon Society, the Monterey Bay Aquarium, the Packard Humanities Institute, the Lucile Packard Foundation for Children's Health, and Stanford University.

Orr was named the first Distinguished Fellow in Family Philanthropy by the National Center for Family Philanthropy, where she has written about donor legacies and board composition for family foundations.
