= National Audio-Visual Conservation Center =

US Library of Congress audiovisual archive

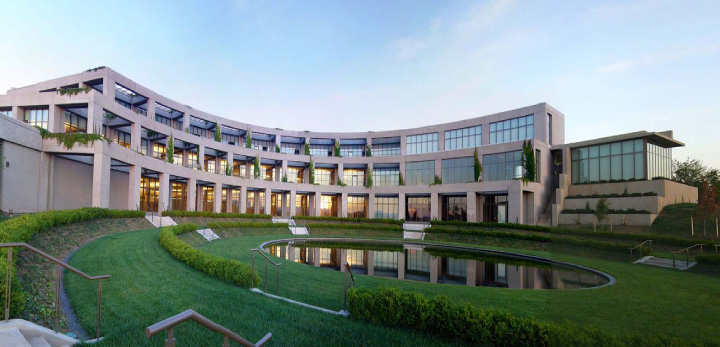
- Packard Campus
- 38°26′35″N 77°58′23″W
- Location: 19053 Mount Pony Road, Culpeper, Virginia
- Established: 2007

Other information
- Website: www.loc.gov/avconservation/packard/

The National Audio-Visual Conservation Center (NAVCC) is a branch of the Library of Congress devoted to preserving the United States' audio-visual history. It includes the Packard Campus (PCAVC), opened in 2007 to store the then entire 6.3 million piece collection of the Library's movie, television, and sound artifacts, the Center's largest facility; the Library's Motion Picture and Television Division and Recorded Sound Division reference centers on Capitol Hill; the Mary Pickford Theater; and any other Library of Congress audio-visual storage facilities that remain outside the Packard Campus audiovisual archive located inside Mount Pony in Culpeper, Virginia.

== Packard Campus establishment ==
From 1969 to 1988, the original campus was a high-security storage facility operated by the Federal Reserve Board, referred to colloquially as "Mt. Pony". With the approval of the United States Congress in 1997, it was purchased by the David and Lucile Packard Foundation from the Federal Reserve Bank of Richmond via a $5.5 million grant, done on behalf of the Library of Congress. With a further $150 million from the Packard Humanities Institute and $82.1 million from Congress, the facility was transformed into the National Audio-Visual Conservation Center, which completed construction in mid-2007, and after transfer of the bulk of archives, opened for free public movie screenings on most weekends in the fall 2008. The campus offered, for the first time, a single site to store all 6.3 million pieces of the Library's movie, television, and sound collection.

Technically, the Packard Campus (PCAVC) is just the largest part of the whole National Audio-Visual Conservation Center (NAVCC), which also consists of the Library of Congress's Motion Picture and Television Division and Recorded Sound Division reference centers on Capitol Hill, the Mary Pickford Theater, and any other Library of Congress audio-visual storage facilities that remain outside the Packard Campus.

The PCAVC design, named Best of 2007 by Mid-Atlantic Construction Magazine, involved upgrading the existing bunker and creating an entirely new, below-ground entry building that also includes a large screening room, office space and research facilities. Designers BAR Architects, project-architect SmithGroup and landscape designers SWA Group, along with DPR Construction, Inc., collaborated in what is now the largest green-roofed commercial facility in the eastern United States, blending into the surrounding environment and ecosystem.

== Federal Reserve bunker ==
With Cold War tensions came fear that in the event of a nuclear war, the economy of the United States would be destroyed. In response to this, the United States Federal Reserve constructed a bunker to protect the computer bank responsible for electronic funds transfers between member banks of the Federal Reserve (the core of a transfer system then called the Federal Reserve Wire Network, today known as Fedwire), which moved some $30 trillion dollars a year in 1975 through the so-called "Culpeper Switch" located at Mt. Pony. It also served as a data backup point for member banks east of the Mississippi River.

Between 1969 and 1988 the facility housed enough U.S. currency (shrink-wrapped and stacked on pallets 9 ft (2.7 m) high) to replenish the cash supply east of the Mississippi River in the event of a catastrophic event.

Dedicated on December 10, 1969, the 400 ft-long (120 m), 140,000 sq ft (13,000 m^{2}) radiation-hardened facility was constructed of steel-reinforced concrete one ft (30 cm) thick. Lead-lined shutters could be dropped to shield the windows of the semi-recessed facility, which is covered by 2 to 4 ft (0.61 to 1.22 m) of dirt and surrounded by barbed-wire fences and a guard post.

Prior to July 1992, the bunker also served as a physical continuity of government facility. With a peacetime staff of 100, the site was designed to support an emergency staff of 540 for 30 days, but only 200 beds were provided in the men's and women's dormitories (to be shared on a "hot-bunk" basis by the staff working around the clock). A pre-planned menu of freeze-dried foods for the first 30 days of occupation was stored on site; private wells would provide uncontaminated water following an attack. Other noteworthy features of the facility were a cold storage area for maintaining bodies unable to be promptly buried (due to high radiation levels outside), an incinerator, indoor pistol range, and a helicopter landing pad.

== Post-Cold War ==
In 1988, all currency was removed from Mount Pony. The Culpeper Switch ceased operation in 1992, its functions having been decentralized to three smaller sites. In addition, its status as continuity of government site was removed. The facility was poorly maintained by a skeleton staff until 1997 when the bunker was offered for sale. With the approval of the United States Congress, it was purchased by the David and Lucile Packard Foundation from the Federal Reserve Bank of Richmond via a $5.5 million grant, done on behalf of the Library of Congress. With a further $150 million from the Packard Humanities Institute and $82.1 million from Congress, the facility was transformed into the National Audio-Visual Conservation Center, which opened in mid-2007. The center offered, for the first time, a single site to store all 6.3 million pieces of the library's movie, television, and sound collection.

== Campus architecture ==
The Packard Campus was designed exploit the original facility's mostly underground, sod-roofed construction - which so insulated it from the elements that no heating system was required: residual heat from the building's numerous computers was used to maintain warmth in cool seasons, and air-conditioning was required in warm (to keep the computers cool first, and staff second). This was renovated and expanded along the principles of green building, with a much larger exposed structure designed to have minimal visual impact on the Virginia countryside by blending into the existing landscape. From the northwest, only a semi-circular terraced arcade appears in the hill to allow natural light into the administrative and work areas. Additionally, the site also included the largest private sector re-forestation effort on the Eastern Seaboard, representing over 9,000 tree saplings and nearly 200,000 other plantings.

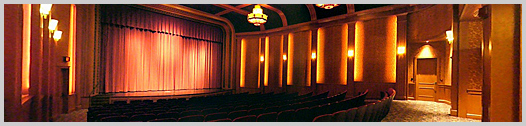
Packard Campus Theater

The underground vaults (some set to temperatures below freezing) contain nearly 90 mi (140 km) of shelving, not including 124 nitrate film vaults: the largest nitrate film storage complex in the Western Hemisphere. The campus's data center is the first archive to preserve digital content at the petabyte (1 million gigabyte) level.

The campus also contains a 206-seat theater capable of projecting both film and modern digital cinema and which features a digital organ that rises from under the stage to accompany silent film screenings. The Packard Campus currently holds semi-weekly screenings of films of cultural significance in its reproduction Art Deco theater according to this schedule.

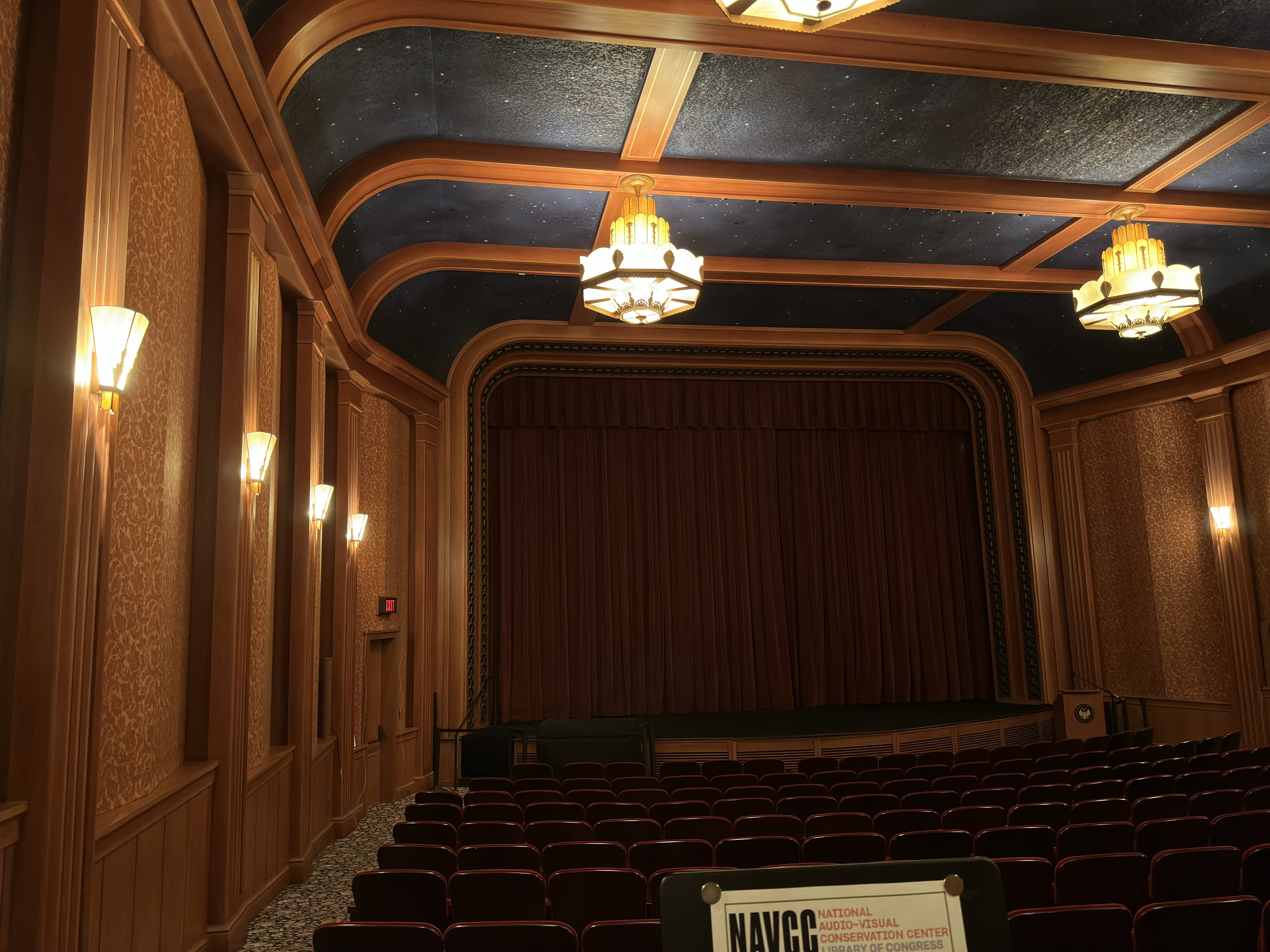
Interior of the Theater in April 2024

== Events ==
=== Mostly Lost Film Identification Workshop ===
Every summer prior to the COVID-19 pandemic, the Packard Campus hosted the Mostly Lost identification workshop for silent and sound films. Unidentified or misidentified silent films and film clips were screened for registered attendees, who collectively attempted to identify the unknown works. The films screened were not only from the Library of Congress's collections, but also from other participating film archives, which have included the George Eastman House, the UCLA Film & Television Archive, the EYE Film Institute of the Netherlands, the University of Southern California's Hugh M. Hefner Moving Image Archive, the Lobster Film Archive, and the Newsfilm Library at the University of South Carolina. Screenings were held in the Packard Campus Theater.

=== Fall Open House ===
The Packard Campus hosts an annual open house on the Columbus Day federal holiday, offering the general public the opportunity to tour the facility and attend presentations by campus staff about the work they do for the Library of Congress and the audio-visual collections they maintain in the facility.
