= Lucile Packard Foundation for Children's Health =

Independent public charity

The Lucile Packard Foundation for Children's Health is an independent public charity, devoted exclusively to elevating the priority of children's health and increasing the quality and accessibility of children's health care through leadership and direct investment. The foundation, established in 1996, evolved from Packard Children's Hospital at Stanford University. The foundation is named for noted philanthropist Lucile Salter Packard, who had a lifelong devotion to the health and well-being of children.

== Programs ==
The foundation is the primary fundraiser for Lucile Packard Children's Hospital; it also works to improve the system of care of children with special health care needs, and it disseminates information to raise awareness and promote action regarding key children's health issues.

== Fundraising ==
Since 1997, the foundation has raised funds to ensure that Lucile Packard Children's Hospital and the pediatric programs at Stanford University School of Medicine are able to provide the finest, family-centered care to children; train the next generation of pediatric medical leaders; and conduct research into treatments and cures for diseases that affect children throughout the world. Growth in community support over the last decade has helped transform Packard Children's into one of the nation's top children's hospitals, and has sustained its commitment to care for any child in the community, including those without health insurance.

== Grantmaking ==
The foundation's grantmaking program aims to promote an improved system of care for children with special health care needs and their families.

== Information ==
The foundation's kidsdata.org website provides information about the health and well-being of children. Kidsdata.org provides facts about children ages 0–18 in the state of California. Data encompass all aspects of children's health, from asthma and alcohol consumption to weight and reading proficiency levels. Kidsdata has been nominated for a Webby award twice.

== In the news ==
The foundation's president and CEO is Cynthia Brandt.

== Lucile Packard ==
Lucile Packard (1914–1987) and her husband, David (1912–1996), co-founder of Hewlett Packard Company, were dedicated to children and were the driving force behind the development of Lucile Packard Children's Hospital. There are several distinct organizations that bear Lucile Packard's name. Among them are The David and Lucile Packard Foundation, the Lucile Packard Foundation for Children's Health, and Lucile Packard Children's Hospital. Because of their similar names, the organizations can be confused with each other, and they often work closely together to help improve the health of children.

== See also ==
- Lucile Packard Children's Hospital
- Stanford University Medical Center
- The David and Lucile Packard Foundation
