= Stanford Theatre =

Movie theater in Palo Alto for classic films

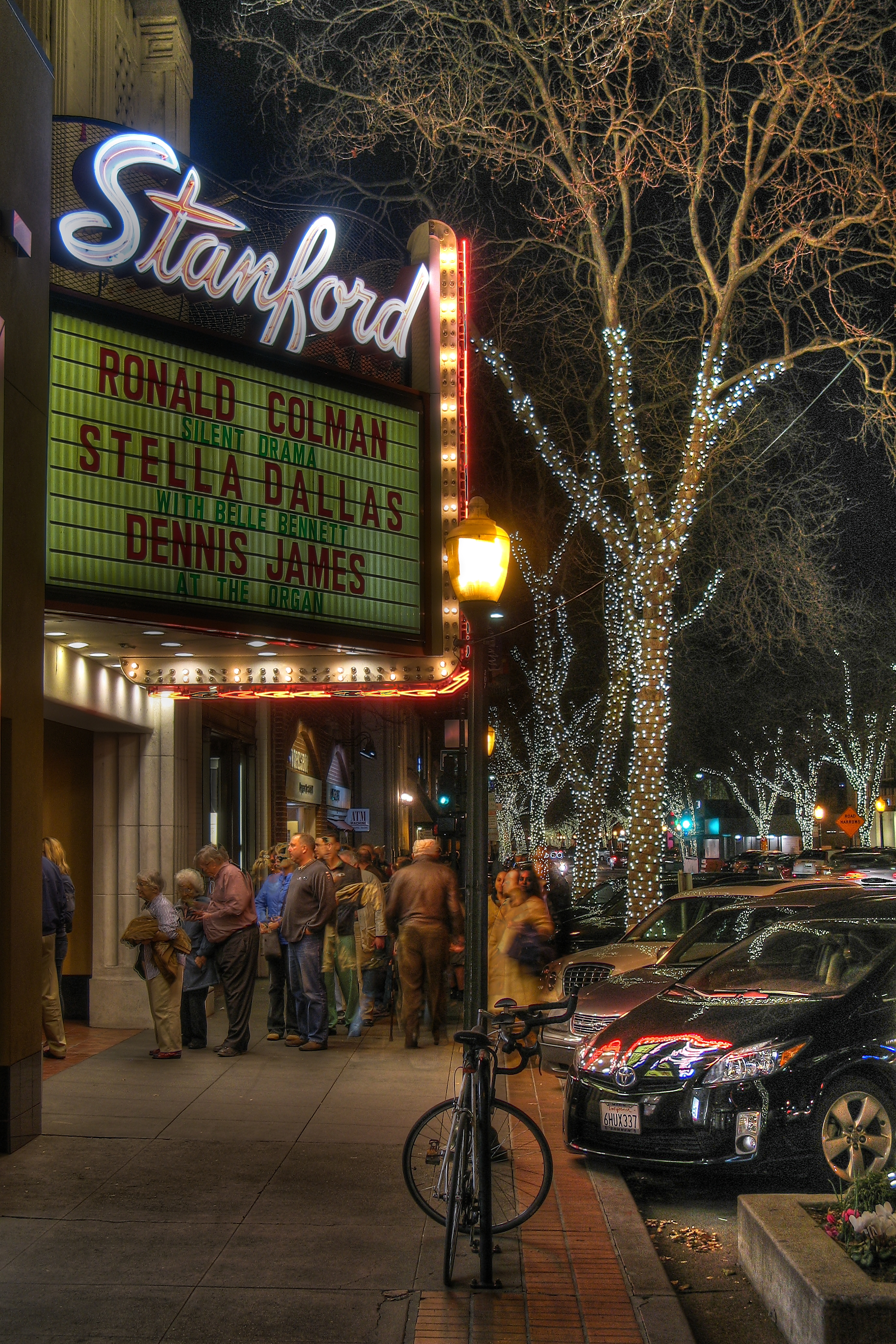
- Stanford Theatre's marquee at night
- Interactive map of Stanford Theatre
- Address: 221 University Avenue, Palo Alto, CA 94022
- Coordinates: 37°26′43″N 122°09′46″W
- Owner: David and Lucile Packard Foundation
- Type: Indoor theatre

Construction
- Opened: June 9, 1925
- Renovated: 1987-1989
- Architect: Weeks and Day

Website
- stanfordtheatre.org

The Stanford Theatre is a classical independent movie theater in Palo Alto, California. It was designed and built in the 1920s as a movie palace styled in neoclassical Persian and Moorish architecture. Today it specializes in films produced between 1910 and 1970 and seasonal programs typically include film festivals for various genres, directors, and actors, such as Alfred Hitchcock, Bette Davis, and Cary Grant. The Stanford Theatre frequently accounts for as much as twenty-five percent of all classic film attendance in the United States.

The Theatre has a "The Mighty Wurlitzer Organ" theatre organ made by Rudolph Wurlitzer Company. The organ is played live during intermissions, as well as to accompany silent films.

== History ==
Designed by architects Weeks and Day, the theatre was built at a cost of approximately US$300,000 (equivalent to about $5,640,000 in 2025) with construction starting in 1924. It had a Leatherbury-Smith orchestral organ installed with pipes ranging in size from a toothpick to a 32-foot pipe providing sounds for stringed instruments, trumpes, flutes, saxophone, clarinet, and various percussion instruments. The Theatre opened on June 9, 1925 with a showing of I'll Show You the Town after a dedication speech and had a capacity of approximately 1500. By the 1960s the Theatre was on hard times, the organ had been removed and the interior was not cleaned to a degree that, "many moviegoers flatly refused to enter the place, no matter what was showing." In 1987 after the death of Fred Astaire, David Woodley Packard had a film festival of Astaire's works at the theatre. The two week festival was so successful that his father, Hewlett-Packard co-founder David Packard, agreed with Woodley Packard's idea to purchase the aging theatre through the Packard Foundation.

It was purchased in 1987 for $7.7 million and restored by the David and Lucile Packard Foundation at an additional cost of $6 million for a 1989 grand opening of The Wizard of Oz. The restoration process included examining over 5,000 sketches to match the original color palette. Part of the restoration included installing an organ to replace the original which had been sold as parts. The process took 2 years to obtain and restore parts which included the 1926 console from Grauman's Chinese Theatre and the organ's 1928 pipes from Loew's Theatre. The Theatre was renovated in the late months of 2017 with repainting, new carpets, and the seats being restored with new padding and mohair coverings. It reopened that December with a showing of The Wizard of Oz

The Stanford Theatre is currently managed by Cyndi Mortensen and operated by the Stanford Theatre Foundation, led by David Woodley Packard.

== Gallery ==
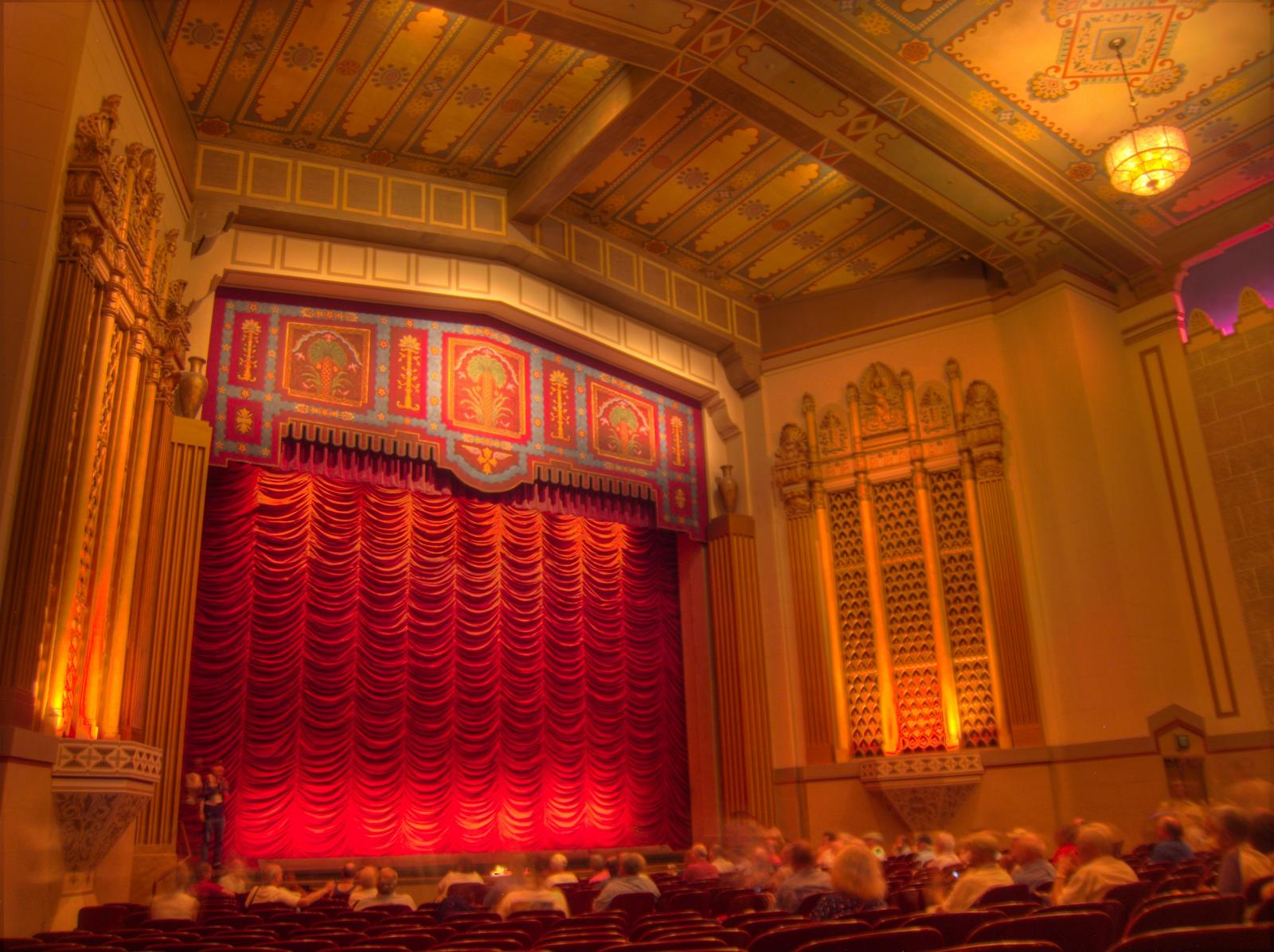
Interior view with curtain down

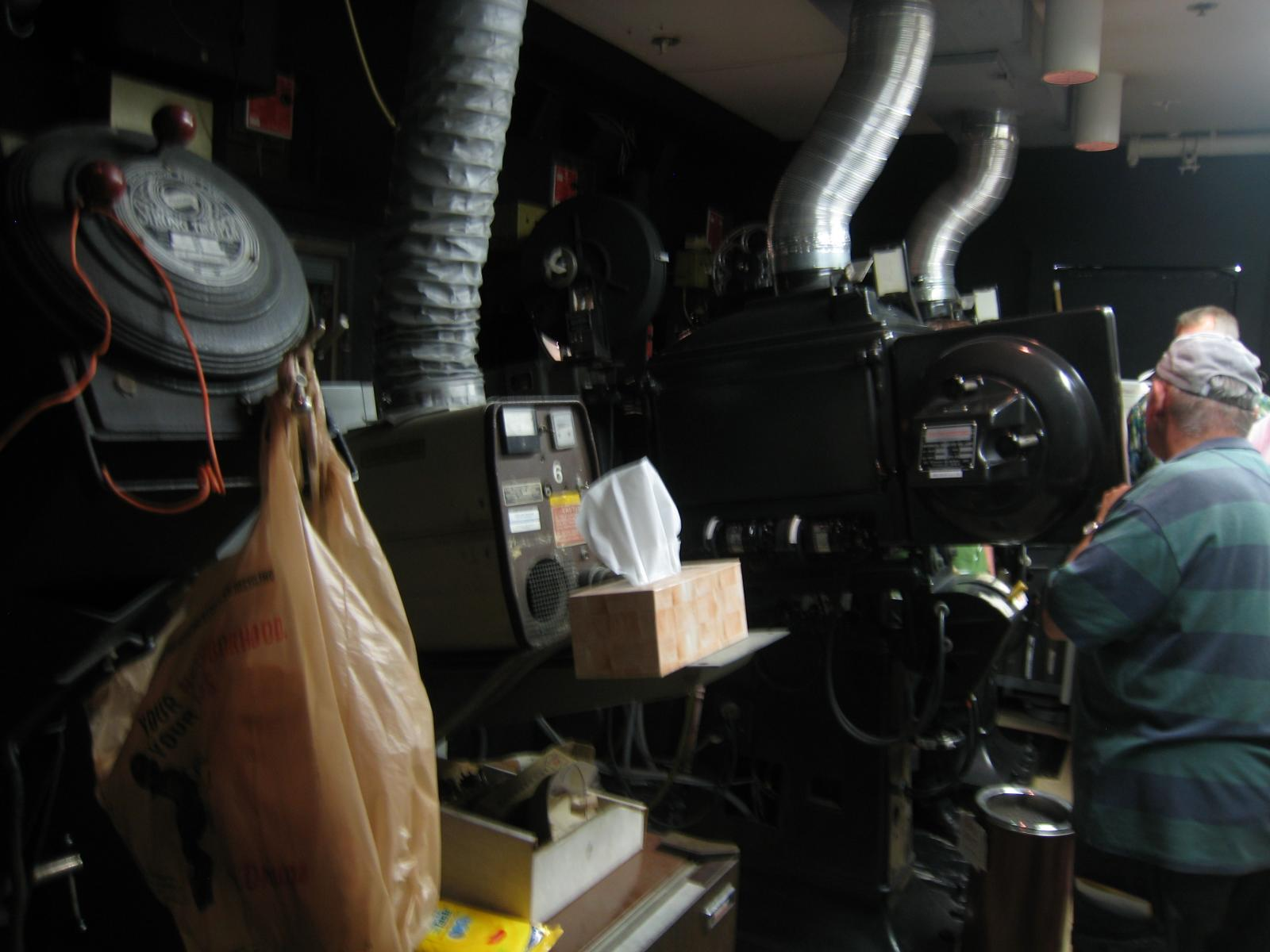
Projection room

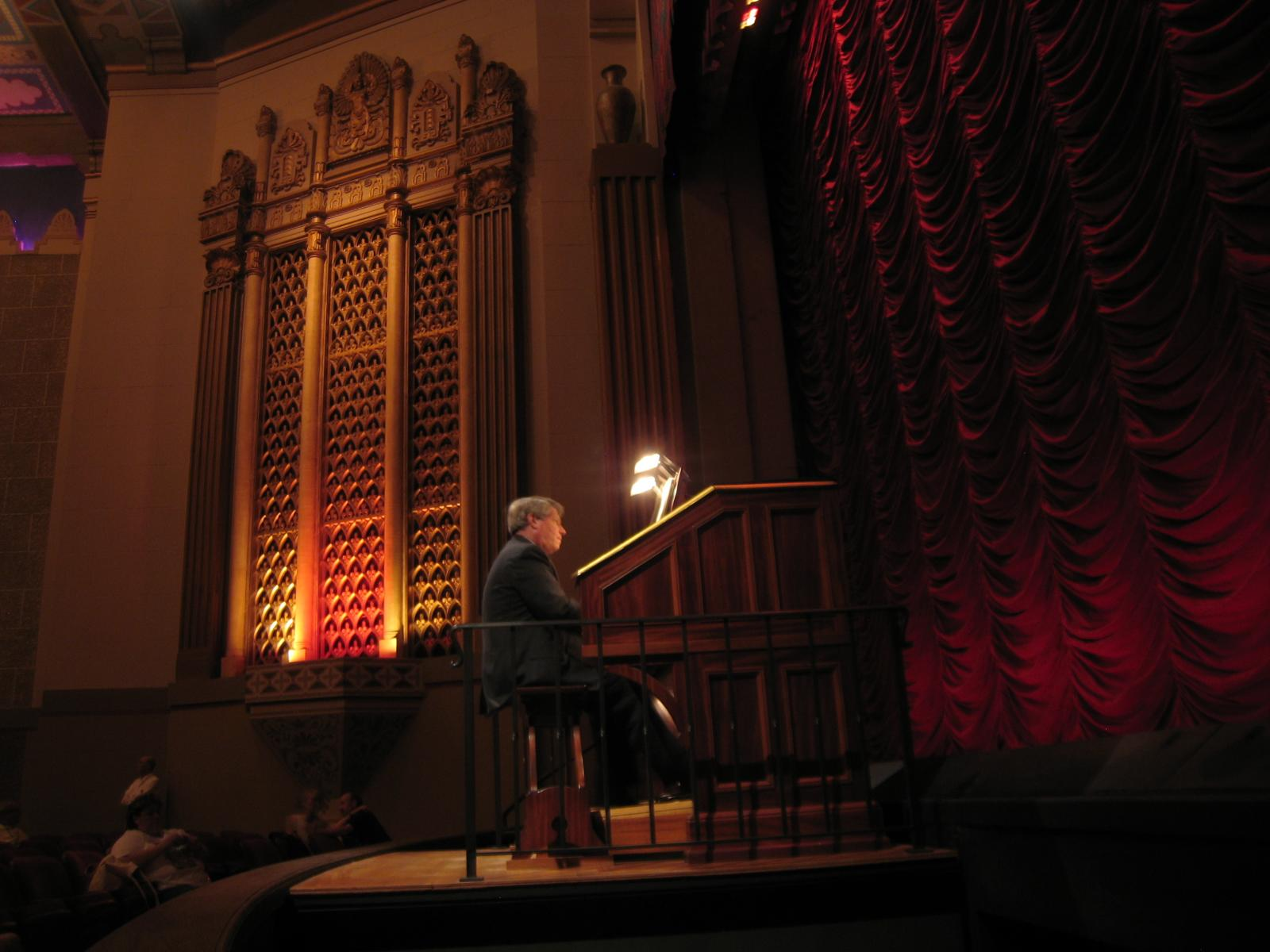
Organ elevated

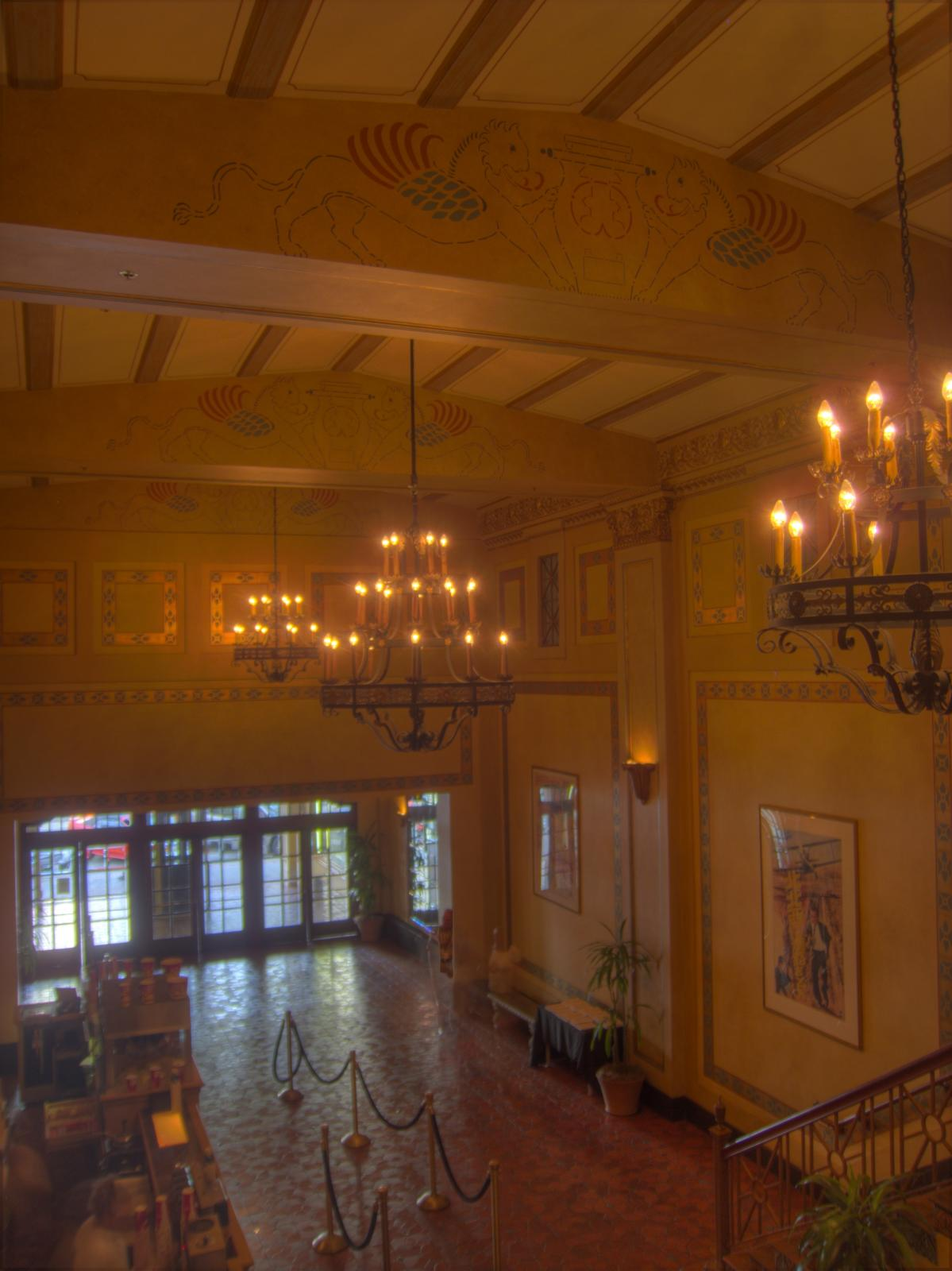
Interior lobby view

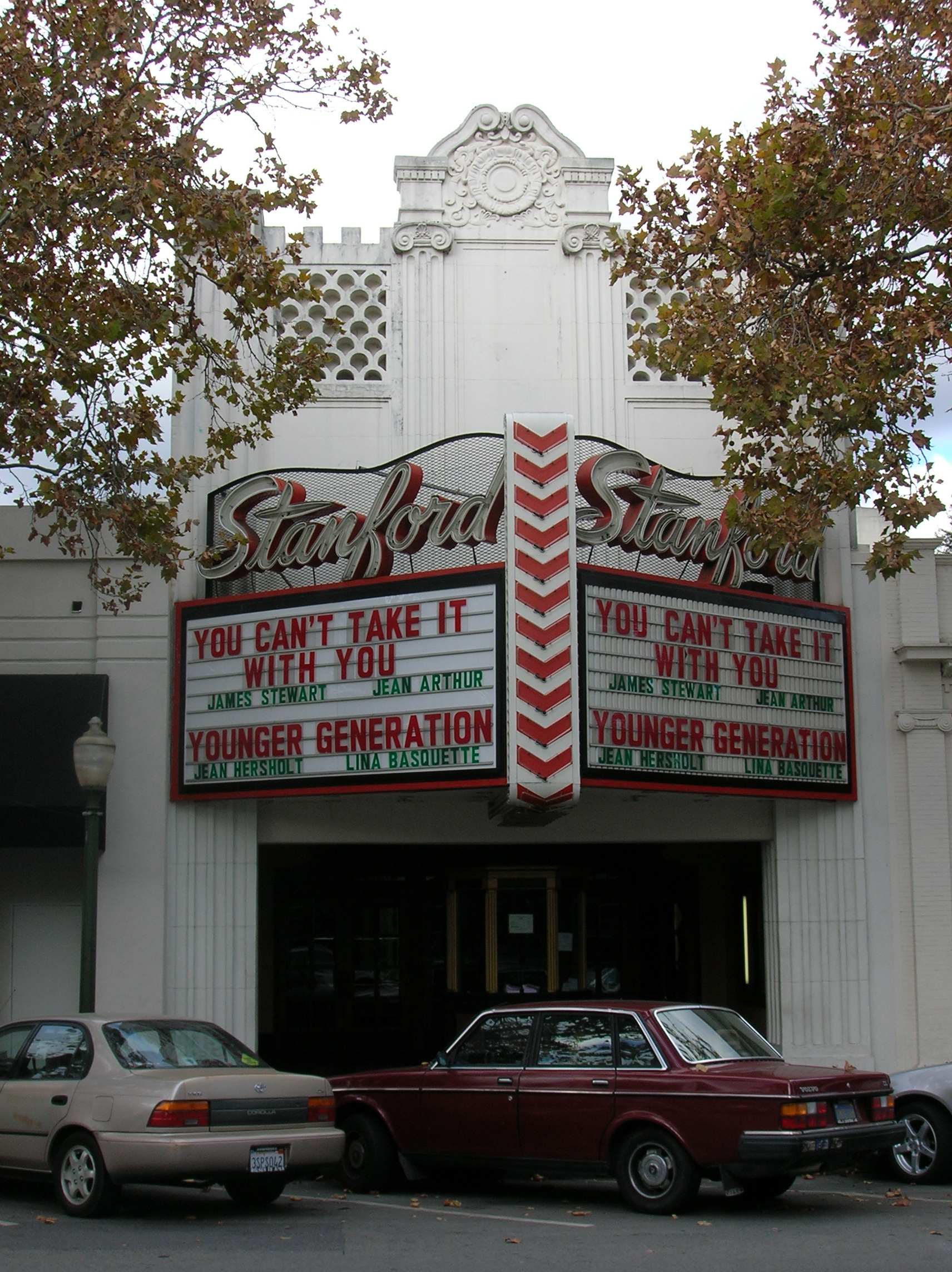
Exterior with marquee

== See also ==
- California Theater
- David and Lucile Packard Foundation
- Packard Humanities Institute
