= David Woodley Packard =

American professor and philanthropist

David Woodley Packard (born 1940) is an American former professor and philanthropist; he is the son of Hewlett-Packard co-founder David Packard. A former HP board member (1987–1999), David is best known for his opposition to the HP-Compaq merger and his support for classical studies, especially the digitization of classics research. He has made significant contribution to the study of the language and the sign repertory of the Minoan Linear A script. Packard currently serves as president of the Packard Humanities Institute.

Packard was responsible for acquiring, with David and Lucile Packard Foundation funds, the former Mount Pony facility for the Library of Congress in 1997; it has opened as the National Audio-Visual Conservation Center. He also supports film preservation through the Packard Humanities Institute. Packard also currently runs operations of the Stanford Theatre.

In 2000, Packard donated USD 5 million to fund an emergency excavation of the Zeugma archeological site, after reading about it in The New York Times, allowing archeologists to preserve ancient mosaics that would otherwise be inundated by the Birecik Dam.

Packard was elected to the American Philosophical Society in 2006.

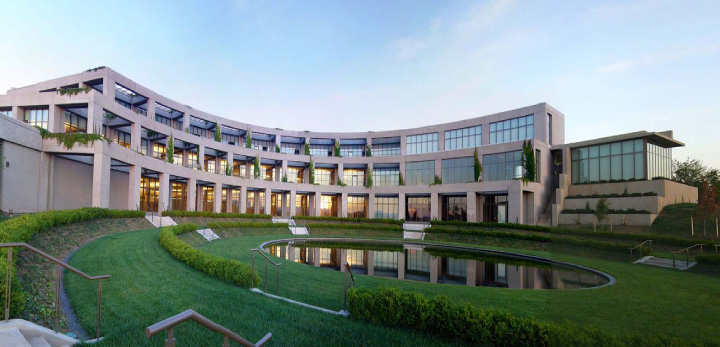
Packard Campus for Audio-Visual Conservation

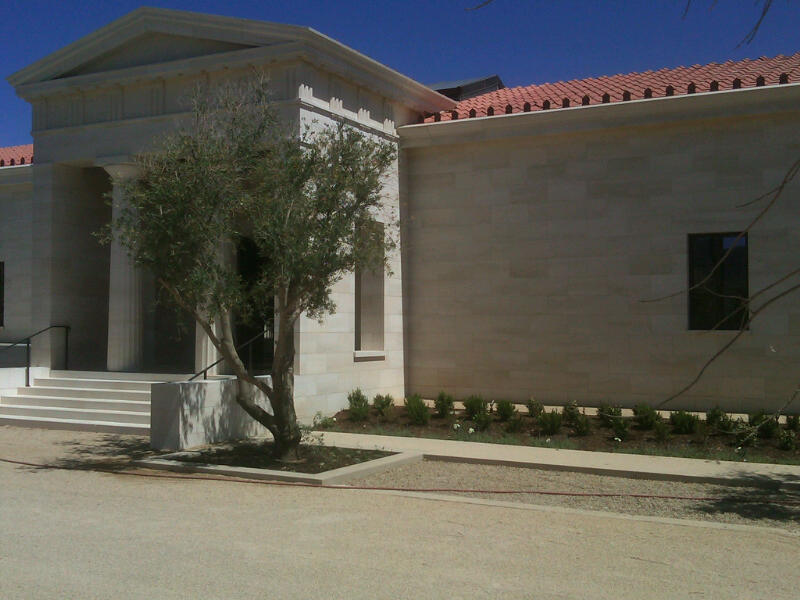
Packard Humanities Institute, Santa Clarita

== See also ==
- David and Lucile Packard Foundation
- Lucile Packard Children's Hospital
- Hewlett-Packard
- HP Garage
- Monterey Bay Aquarium Research Institute
- List of wealthiest foundations

== Selected works ==
- (1967) A Study of the Minoan Linear A Tablets (unpublished doctoral dissertation, Harvard University)
- (1968) Contextual and Statistical Analysis of Linear A // Atti e memorie der primo congresso internazionale di Micenologia 1, pp. 389–394. Rome.
- (1968) A concordance to Livy. Cambridge, Mass: Harvard University Press. ISBN 9780674158900.
- (1971) Computer Techniques in the Study of the Minoan Linear Script A // Kadmos 10:52-59.
- (1974) Minoan Linear A. University of California Press. ISBN 0-520-02580-6.
