= Robert Kallman =

American cancer researcher (1922–2003)

- Born: Robert Friend Kallman; May 21, 1922; Brooklyn, New York, US
- Died: August 8, 2003 (aged 81); Palo Alto, California, US

Robert Friend Kallman (May 21, 1922 – August 8, 2003) was an American scientist known for his early research on the effects of radiation on cancer cells. He died of lung disease on August 8, 2003, at Stanford Hospital.
