= UCLA Film & Television Archive =

Archive for film and television production

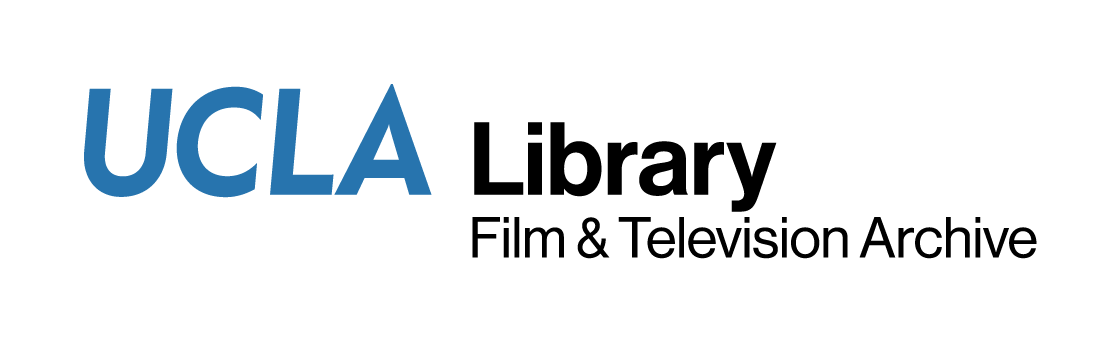
- Established: 1965; 61 years ago
- Location: 405 Hilgard Ave. Powell Library, Room 46 Los Angeles, CA 90095
- Type: Audiovisual archive
- Key holdings: John H. Mitchell Television Collection, Hearst Metrotone News collection, and collections from Columbia, Paramount, Warner Bros., 20th Century Fox
- Collection size: 500,000 items
- Director: May Hong HaDuong
- Website: https://cinema.ucla.edu/

The UCLA Film & Television Archive, a unit of the UCLA Library, is a visual arts organization focused on the preservation, study, and appreciation of film and television, based at the University of California, Los Angeles (UCLA).

As a nonprofit exhibition venue, the archive screens over 400 films and videos yearly, primarily at the Billy Wilder Theater, located inside the Hammer Museum in Westwood, California. Formerly, it screened films at the James Bridges Theater on the UCLA campus. The archive is funded by UCLA, public and private interests, and the entertainment industry. It is a member of the International Federation of Film Archives.

The Archive is a division of the UCLA Library. As of January 2021, its collection hosted more than 500,000 items, including approximately 159,000 motion pictures and 132,000 television programs, more than 27 million feet of newsreels, more than 222,000 broadcast recordings, and more than 9,000 radio transcription discs. The archive has the largest nitrate-safe storage facility on the West Coast, located in Santa Clarita and funded by the Packard Humanities Institute (which the archive shares the building with) and David Packard.

== History ==
The UCLA Film & Television Archive was initially created as the ATAS/UCLA Television Library when the Academy of Television Arts and Sciences and the UCLA Theater Arts Department worked together to create the library in 1965. In 1968, the Film Department of UCLA founded the Film Archive. After this, graduate students and staff members began collaborating to rescue copies of movies that Hollywood studios were discarding. This included nitrate film prints, which are notoriously unstable. The two institutions operated separately until their unification by Robert Rosen, a film preservationist who was appointed director of both the library and archive in 1976. The archive began its film preservation and restoration program. It hired Robert Gitt, and began restoring several classic films including Double Indemnity, Blonde Venus, and The Big Sleep.

The Archive hosted virtual screenings in lieu of its in-person presentations during the COVID-19 pandemic.

The archive appointed its fourth director, May Hong HaDuong in January 2021. She was the first woman and person of color to become director of the archive.

== Collections ==
The Archive has hosted its collection in a Stoa building in Santa Clarita, California since 2015. It shares the facilities with the Packard Humanities Institute. The building was funded and built to the specification of David Woodley Packard.

The archive's holdings include 35mm collections from Paramount Global/Paramount Pictures and Republic Pictures, Disney/20th Century Studios, Warner Bros. Discovery/Warner Bros., Sony/Columbia Pictures, New World Pictures, Amazon/MGM, United Artists and Orion Pictures, NBCUniversal/Universal Pictures, and RKO. Additional film donations have been made by the Academy of Motion Picture Arts and Sciences, the American Film Institute, the Directors Guild of America, and figures including Hal Ashby, Tony Curtis, Charlton Heston, Orson Welles, Rock Hudson, Jeff Chandler, Radley Metzger, Richard Conte, Audie Murphy, John McIntire, John Wayne, Fred MacMurray, and William Wyler. It holds the entire Hearst Metrotone News Library. It holds over 300 kinescope prints from the now-defunct DuMont Television Network. It holds restored prints of the cartoon library of Paramount Pictures.

== Billy Wilder Theater ==
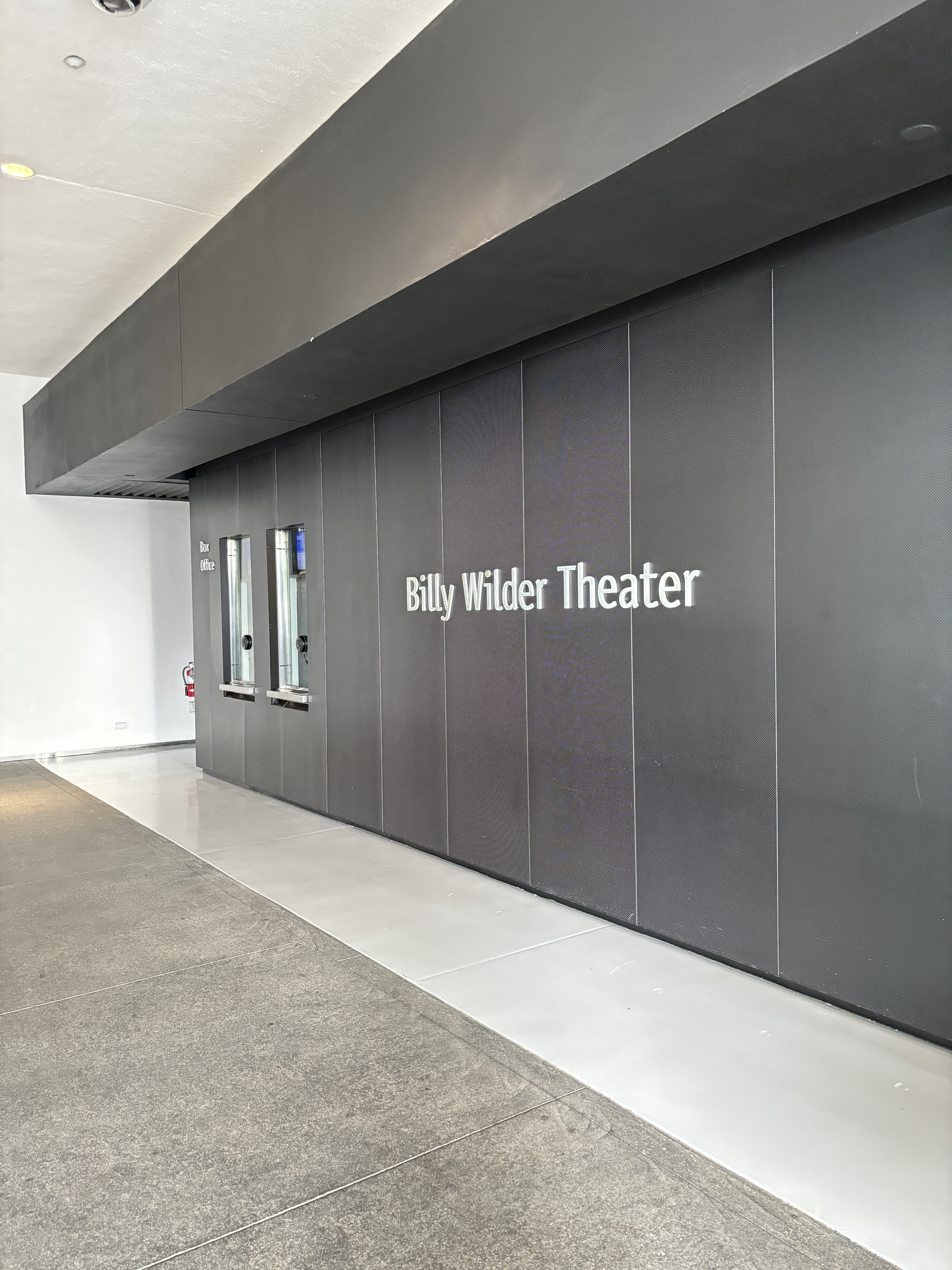
Billy Wilder Theater, September 2024

The Billy Wilder Theater is on the courtyard level of the Hammer Museum. Funded by a $5 million gift from Audrey L. Wilder and designed by Michael Maltzan Architecture, the 295-seat Billy Wilder Theater is the home of the archive's cinematheque and of the Hammer's public programs, which includes artists' lectures, literary readings, musical concerts, and public conversations. The theater, which cost $7.5 million to complete, is one of the few in the country where audiences may watch the entire spectrum of moving images in their original formats from the earliest silent films requiring variable speed projection to the most current digital cinema and video.
