= Michael Link =

Michael Link may refer to:

- Michael Georg Link, German politician
- Michael P. Link, American oncologist

== See also ==
- Michael Lynk, Canadian legal academic
