= Laura Kissel =

American filmmaker

- Born: May 29, 1969 (age 57)
- Occupations: Filmmaker, Educator
- Notable work: Cotton Road

Laura K. Kissel (born May 29, 1969) is an American educator and documentary filmmaker based in Columbia, South Carolina. Kissel's work explores contemporary social and political landscapes, the representation of history and the use of orphan films.

Her award winning feature documentary Cotton Road (2014) is about the commodity of cotton and the human labor required to transform it as it travels from farms and factories to consumers.

== Education ==
Kissel graduated from Manhattan High School in Manhattan, Kansas. She received her bachelor of science degree in cinema and photography from Ithaca College in 1991. She then went on to receive a master of fine arts degree in radio-TV-film from Northwestern University in 1999. Following graduation she relocated to Columbia, South Carolina, having accepted an assistant professor position at the University of South Carolina.

== Career ==
Kissel is drawn towards the use of the long take in documentary film and video, which she sees as a discovery process, enabled by the duration of the frame, to uncover the nature of things in an exercise for clarity. Her choice to use filmmaking as a way of engaging with the world and exploring questions about culture, memory, and historical representation is evident in themes throughout her work. Her films have been screened at the Black Maria Film Festival, the Atlanta Film Festival and the Library of Congress' Mary Pickford Theater.

Kissel is a professor of media arts and film and media studies at the University of South Carolina, where she serves as the director of the School of Visual Art and Design. She has worked to create an inventory of Helen Hill's films in effort to preserve her legacy. Kissel first met Hill at the University of South Carolina’s Orphan Film Symposium, where Hill gave a presentation on her experiences with saving her artistic film works after Hurricane Katrina.

Over the course of her career, Kissel has received numerous awards and fellowships for her work, including a Fulbright Award, a MacDowell Colony Fellowship and funding from the South Carolina Humanities Council and the Fledgling Fund. Kissel was named as the South Carolina Arts Commission Media Arts Fellow in 2008. In 2018 she was given a Distinguished Research Service Award by the University of South Carolina.

== Cotton Road ==
Her 2014 documentary Cotton Road tells a global story about the commodity of cotton following its life cycle alongside the human labor required to transform it as it travels from farms and factories to consumers. It has been honored with eight festival awards and been exhibited around the world in film and video festivals, at community events on sustainability, and in classrooms. Available in four languages, Cotton Road is now the cornerstone of an educational campaign by the NGO Pro Ethical Trade Finland where it’s used to promote equitable global trade, sustainable production and responsible consumption. It was included in South Carolina Educational Television’s inaugural season of the public television show Reel South and has been broadcast on more than 75 national public television stations, including in the major markets of New York, Los Angeles, and Chicago.

== Filmography ==
Year	Title	Role	Description
1991	Campaign For Full Citizenship	Producer/Director/Editor/Director of Photography	Short Film
1998	Verdant Hills: Healing Nature, Sustaining Life	Director/Editor/Director of Photography	Short Film
1999	Leaving Bristol	Producer/Director/Editor/Director of Photography	Short Film
2001	Aviatrix:Women Aviators of the Silent and Sound Era	Editor	Short Film
2002	Vivian's Beauty Shop	Producer/Director/Editor/ Director of Photography	Short Film
2005	Cabin Field	Producer/Director/Editor/ Director of Photography	Feature Film
2007	Unfettering the Falcons	Co-Director/Co-Producer	Short Film
2008	Beyond the Classroom: CHINA	Director/Editor/Director of Photography	Short Film
2008	Incoming Messages	Director of Photography	Short Film
2009	Portrait of Turner	Director of Photography	Short Film
2009	Open Secret	Director of Photography	Feature Film
2011	Window Cleaning in Shanghai	Director/Editor/Director of Photography	Short Film
2011	Tan Mian Hua	Director/Editor/Director of Photography	Short Film
2011	htar tar (weaving)	Director/Editor/Director of Photography	Short Film
2012	May Day	Director/Editor/Director of Photography	Short Film
2014	Cotton Road	Producer/Director/Editor/ Director of Photography	Feature Film
2014	May River Oysters	Director/Editor/Director of Photography	Short Film

== Bibliography ==
- Kissel, Laura (2002). "The Research Value of Amateur Films: Integrating the Use of Amateur and Found Footage into a Film Production Course". The Moving Image. 2 (2): 153–157. JSTOR 41167090.
- Kissel, Laura (June 2003). "Lost, found and remade: an interview with archivist and filmmaker Carolyn Faber". Film History. 15 (2): 208–213. doi:10.2979/FIL.2003.15.2.208. JSTOR 3815512.
- Kissel, Laura (December 2008). "The Terrain of the Long Take". Journal of Visual Culture. 7 (3): 349–361. doi:10.1177/1470412908096341. S2CID 145325835.
- Kissel, Laura (2009). "Disability is Us: Remembering, Recovering, and Remaking the Image of Disability". Filming Difference. pp. 17–40. doi:10.7560/719231-003. ISBN 978-0-292-79355-2. S2CID 243782592.
- Kissel, Laura (2016). "The Memory Project and Other Ways of Knowing: Filmmaking, Affect and Embodied Knowledge". In Pickowicz, Paul G.; Zhang, Yingjin (eds.). Filming the Everyday: Independent Documentaries in Twenty-First-Century China. Rowman & Littlefield. pp. 99–118. ISBN 978-1-4422-7025-1.
