= Hearst Metrotone News =

American newsreel series (1914–1967)

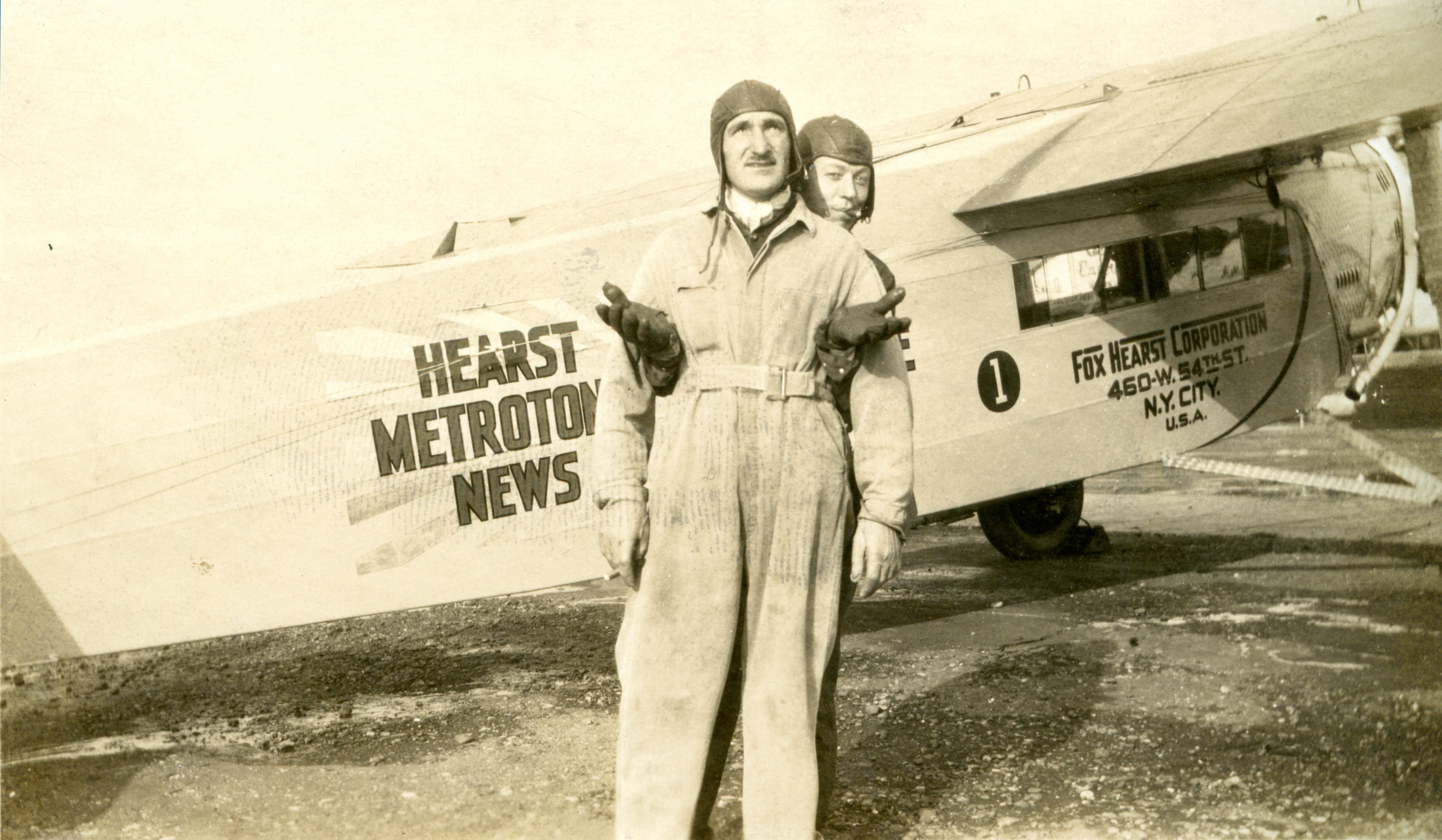
Hearst Metrotone News airplane (from Lizotte Family photo album)

Hearst Metrotone News (renamed News of the Day in 1936) was a newsreel series that ran from 1914 to 1967 produced by the Hearst Corporation, founded by William Randolph Hearst.

== History ==
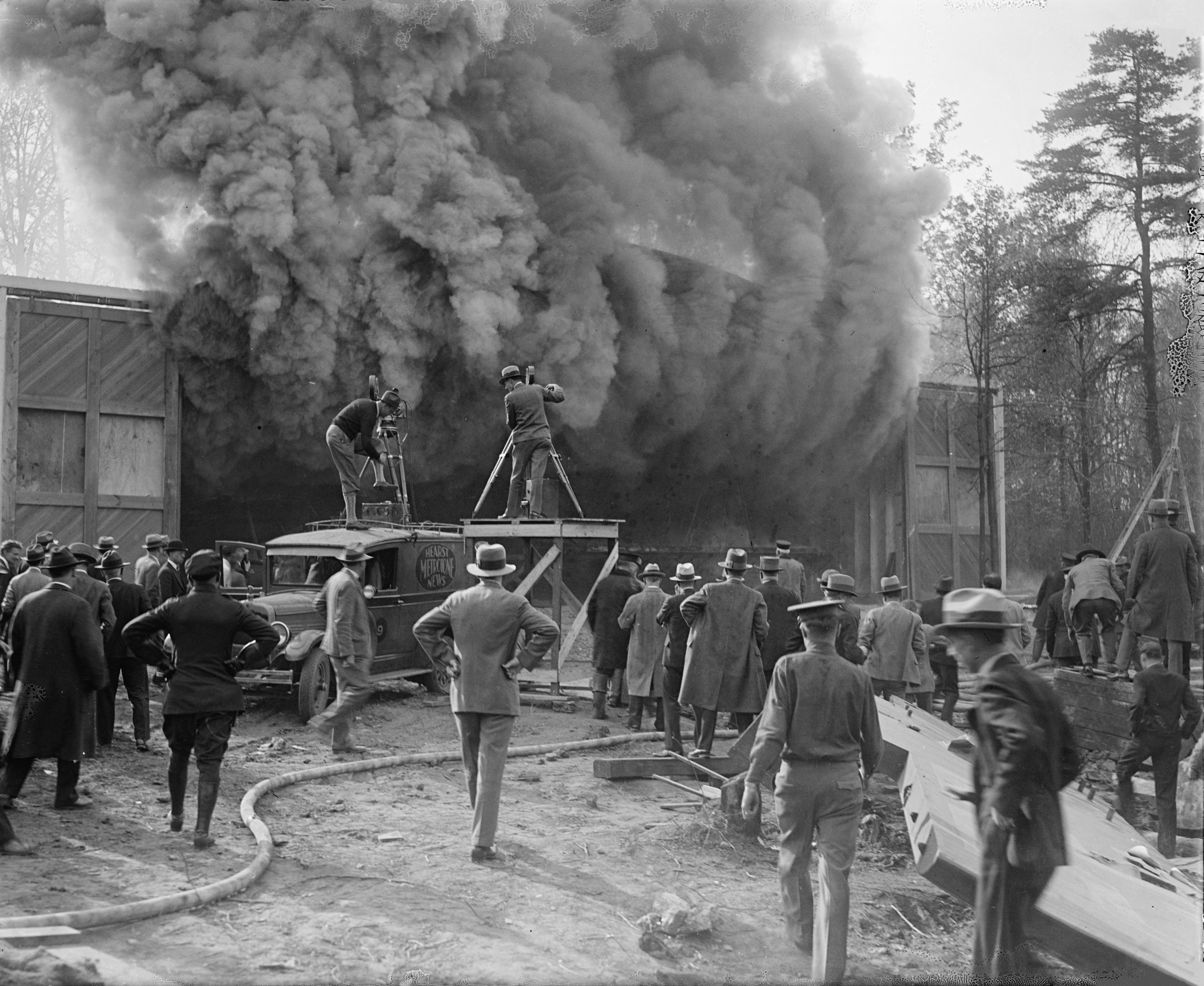
A Hearst Metrotone News crew filming a fire.

Hearst produced silent newsreels under the titles of Hearst Newsreel, International Newsreel, and MGM News before settling on the generic title Hearst Metrotone News. From January 1919 to July 1929, International Newsreel was produced by Hearst's International News Service and released by Universal Studios.

Hearst began to release sound newsreels in September 1929 under an agreement with Fox Film Corporation using the Fox Movietone sound system. Hearst dissolved its agreement with Fox in October 1934, and released its newsreels through Metro-Goldwyn-Mayer from then until 1967. William Randolph Hearst was a controversial figure for several years. In November 1936, in reaction to protests and moviegoers' booing of the Hearst newsreel when it began showing, causing theaters to edit out references to Hearst, the name of the newsreel was officially changed to News of the Day by Hearst. The Hearst Metrotone News name continued to appear on the copyright notice at the end of the newsreel. Michael Fitzmaurice was the primary announcers for Hearst-Metrotone newsreels.

Other U.S. newsreel series include The March of Time (1935-1951), Pathé News (1910-1956), Paramount News (1927-1957), Fox Movietone News (1928-1963), and Universal Newsreel (1929-1967).

In 1981, the entire Hearst newsreel library was acquired by the UCLA Film and Television Archive and held by the Packard Humanities Institute that is scanning the film on Scanity motion picture film scanner.

In cooperation with the UCLA Film and Television Archive, The Packard Humanities Institute Packard Humanities Institute developed a website (newsreels.net) to make the Hearst newsreel collection more easily accessible to the public. Over 20,000 news stories are available to view on the site.
