= Michael P. Link =

American oncologist

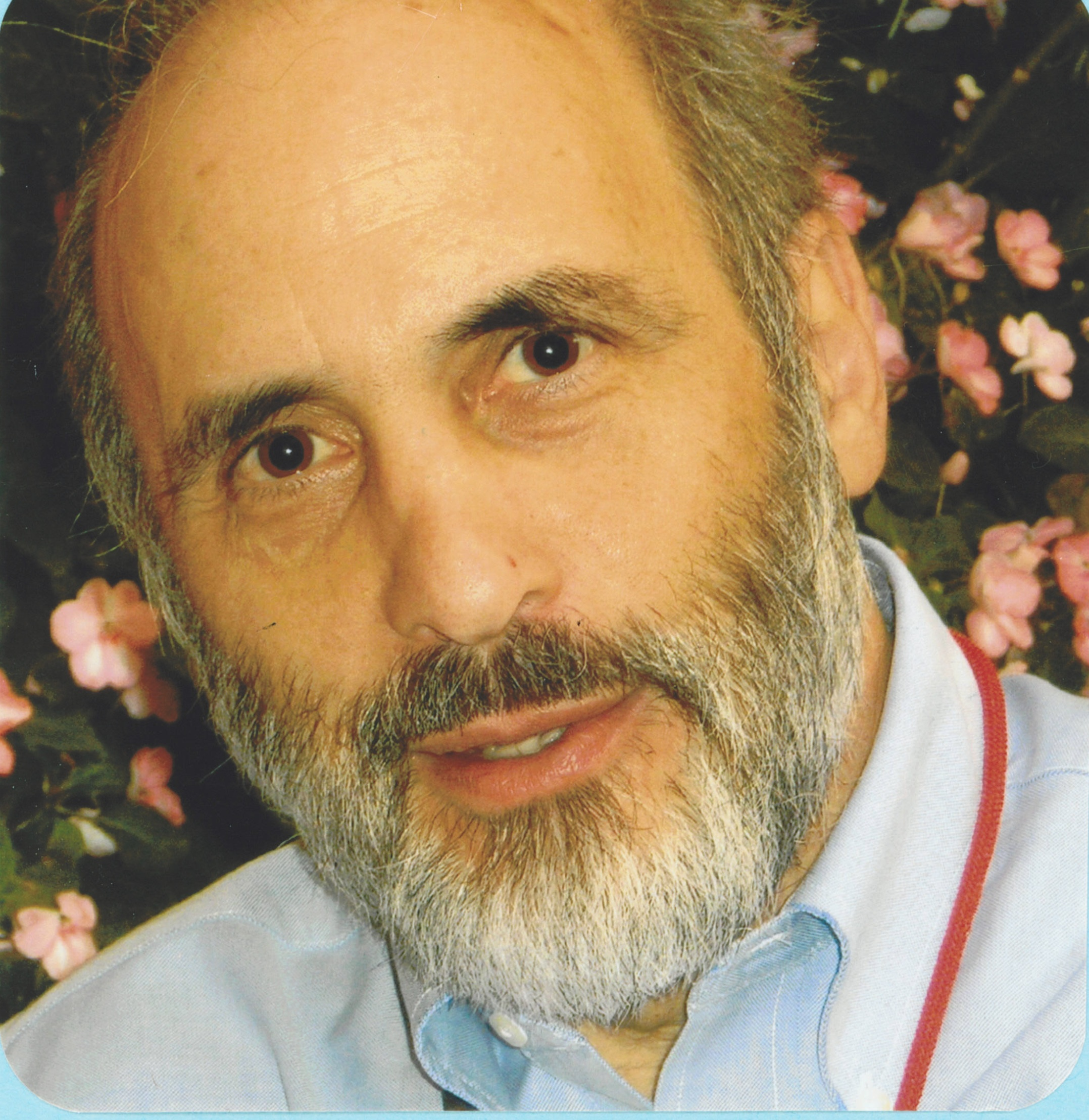
- Born: Cleveland, Ohio, USA

Academic background
- Education: AB, Political Science, 1970, Columbia College; MD, 1974, Stanford University School of Medicine

Academic work
- Institutions: Lucile Packard Children's Hospital; Stanford University School of Medicine

Michael P. Link is an American oncologist. He is the Lydia J. Lee Professor of Pediatric Hematology/Oncology at Stanford University School of Medicine.

== Early life and education ==
Link was born and raised in Cleveland, Ohio. He earned his Bachelor of Arts degree in political science from Columbia College in 1970 and was inducted as a member of Phi Beta Kappa. Link then earned his medical degree from Stanford University School of Medicine in 1974 and completed an internship in medicine at Boston Children's Hospital.

== Career ==
Upon completing his formal education, Link joined the faculty at Stanford University School of Medicine in 1979 and for 10 years served as co-director of Lucile Packard Children's Hospital's oncology program. Three years later, he joined the Board of Directors at the American Society of Clinical Oncology (ASCO) where he served in numerous ASCO leadership positions. At the turn of the century, Link was appointed chief of the division of pediatric oncology, hematology and bone marrow transplantation at the Stanford University School of Medicine, and director of oncology, hematology and bone marrow transplantation services at Lucile Salter Packard Children's Hospital. In these roles, he continued to research the management of children with malignant lymphomas and sarcomas. By 2003, he was further promoted to the Lydia J. Lee Professorship in Pediatric Oncology.

In January 2010, Link was elected the first pediatric oncologist to serve as ASCO President. As president, Link was expected to lead the Society’s efforts to advance cancer research and improve health policy for oncology patients. After stepping down, he was the recipient of the 2018 ASCO Distinguished Career Award as someone who "has had a major impact on the subspecialty through some combination of research, education, patient care, and advocacy."
