= Franklin Orr =

American engineer, academic, and former government official

Franklin (Lynn) Orr, Jr.
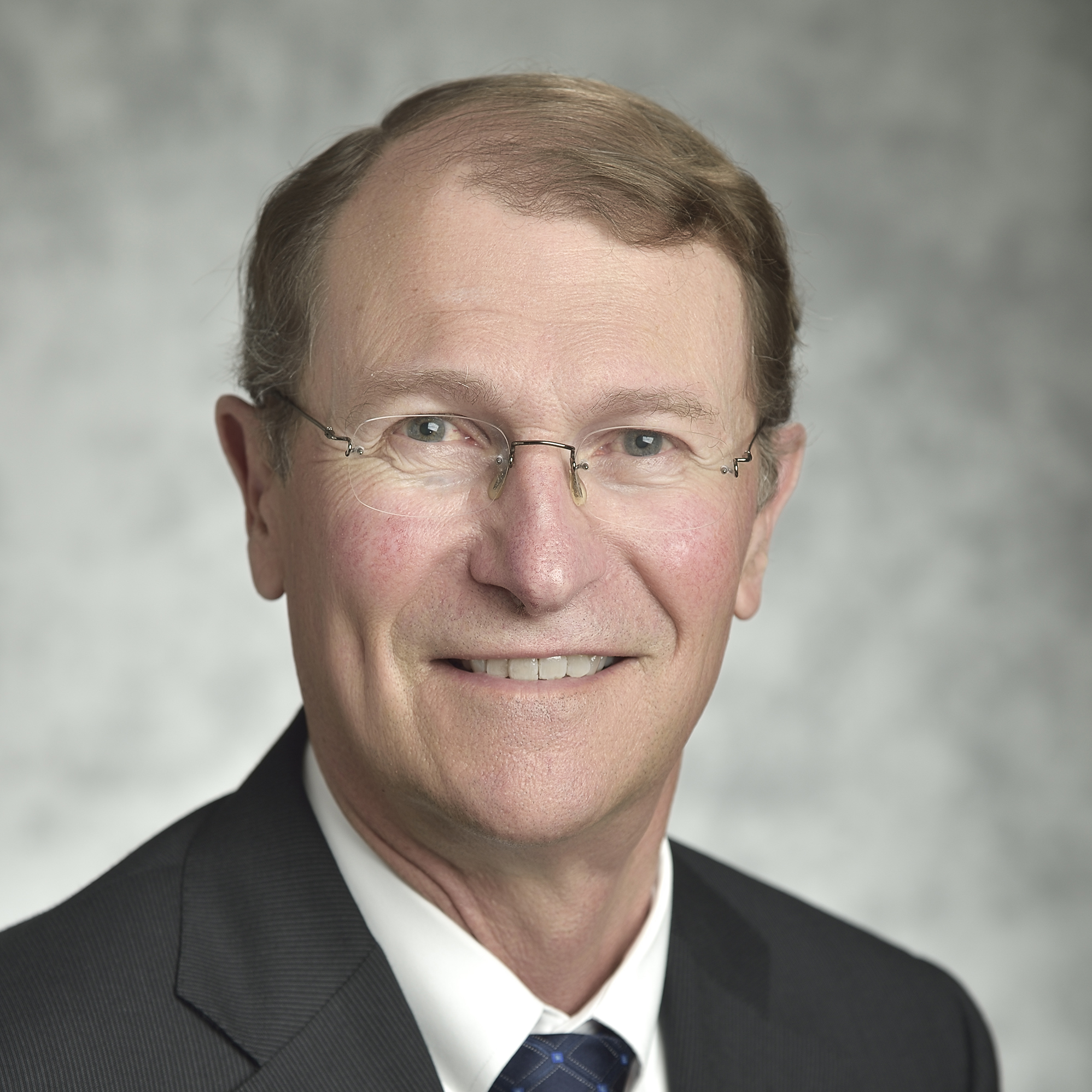
- Born: 1946 (age 79–80); United States
- Education: University of Minnesota; Stanford University
- Known for: Flow in Porous Media; Enhanced Oil Recovery; Geological CO_{2} Storage
- Spouse: Susan Packard Orr
- Awards: National Academy of Engineering (2002); Secretary's Exceptional Service Award, U.S. Dept. of Energy
- Scientific career
- Fields: Chemical engineering
- Workplaces: Stanford University; U.S. Department of Energy
- Doctoral advisors: L. E. Scriven

External videos
- “Franklin Orr at Stanford's Climate and Energy Leadership” “Energy@Stanford with Franklin M. Orr”

Franklin (Lynn) M. Orr Jr. is an American chemical engineer and former Under Secretary for Science and Energy of the U.S. Department of Energy from 2014 to 2017. Prior to his government service, he was a professor of engineering at the Stanford Department of Energy Resources Engineering. He was elected a member of the U.S. National Academy of Engineering in 2000 for contributions to understanding of complex multicomponent flows in porous media and its applications to the design of enhanced oil recovery processes; and for superb academic leadership. He is married to Susan Packard Orr.

== Education and early career ==
Orr grew up and attended high school in Houston, Texas. He attended Stanford University, where he earned his Bachelor of Science in chemical engineering in 1969. While at Stanford, he studied abroad at Imperial College in London and was named Rotary Undergraduate Scholar.

In 1969, he became a graduate student of chemical engineering at the University of Minnesota department of chemical engineering and materials science under doctoral advisor L. E. Scriven. He left for two years, 1970–1972, to serve in the U.S. Public Health Service. His thesis was published in 1976 with the title, "Numerical Simulation of Viscous Flow with a Free Surface". During his time in graduate school, Franklin also prepared journal publications with his advisor, including:

- F.M. Orr, L.E. Scriven, A.P. Rivas, "Pendular rings between solids: meniscus properties and capillary forces", Journal of Fluid Mechanics 67(4), 723-742 (1975).
- F.M. Orr, R.A. Brown, L.E. Scriven "Three-dimensional menisci: Numerical simulation by finite elements", Journal of Colloid and Interface Science 60(1), 137-147 (1977).
- F.M. Orr, L.E. Scriven "Rimming flow: numerical simulation of steady, viscous, free-surface flow with surface tension", Journal of Fluid Mechanics 84(1), 145-165 (1978).

== Academic career ==
Franklin became an associate professor of petroleum engineering at Stanford University in 1985 followed by promotion to professor in 1987. In 1991 he became chair of the department of petroleum engineering; in 1994 he was selected as dean of the school of earth sciences. He was the founding director of two energy and conservation projects: the Global Climate and Energy Project in 2002 and the Precourt Institute for Energy in 2009. He became professor emeritus in 2014.

== Government service ==
Along with the previously mentioned time with the Public Health Service, Orr also joined the United States Department of Energy as Under Secretary for Science and Energy under President Barack Obama and Energy Secretary Ernest Moniz in 2014, where he remained until January 2017. In this role, he served as the principal advisor on energy and science initiatives and clean energy technologies in general. He was also tasked with integrating the basic science, applied research and technology development and deployment occurring across the various divisions of the U.S. Department of Energy. Part of this effort included oversight of the office of Electricity Delivery and Energy Reliability, Energy Efficiency and Renewable Energy (EERE), Nuclear Energy, and Science, which included 13 national laboratories.

== Journal publications ==
Orr has authored more than 100 journal articles describing significant advances in flow in porous media, enhanced oil recovery, and geological CO_{2} storage, including:

- M. Blunt, F.J. Fayers, F.M. Orr "Carbon dioxide in enhanced oil recovery", Energy Conversion and Management, 34(9-11), 1042 (1993).
- R. Juanes, E.J. Spiteri, F.M. Orr, M.J. Blunt "Impact of relative permeability hysteresis on geological CO_{2} storage", Water Resources Research, 42(12), 1042 (2006).
- S. Taku Ide, K. Jessen, F.M. Orr "Storage of CO_{2} in saline aquifers: Effects of gravity, viscous, and capillary forces on amount and timing of trapping", International Journal of Greenhouse Gas Control, 1(4), 481-491 (2007).
- M.A. Hesse, F.M. Orr, H.A. Tchelepi "Gravity currents with residual trapping", Journal of Fluid Mechanics, 611, 35-60 (2008).
- F.M. Orr "Onshore Geologic Storage of CO_{2}", Science, 325(5948), 1656-1658 (2009).

== Awards and honors ==
Orr's contributions to research, education and government service have received numerous awards, many of which highlight his passion for problems associated with energy, fuels and sustainability. In 2000, Orr was appointed to the U.S. National Academy of Engineering; his election citation stated:

"For contributions to understanding of complex multicomponent flows in porous media and its applications to the design of enhanced oil recovery processes; and for superb academic leadership.,"

— U.S. National Academy of Engineering

Other awards and honors include:

- Robert S. Schechter Award and Lecture, University of Texas at Austin (2018)
- Aurel Stodola Medal and Lecture, Eidgenössische Technische Hochschule (ETH) Zürich (2017)
- Izatt Christensen Award and Lecture, Brigham Young University (2017)
- Secretary's Exceptional Service Award, US Department of Energy (2017)
- IOR Pioneer, Society of Petroleum Engineers (2006)
- Honorary Doctorate in Engineering, Heriot-Watt University, Edinburgh, Scotland (2005)
- Robert Earl McConnell Award, AIME (2001)
- Election, National Academy of Engineering (2000)
- Keleen and Carlton Beal Chair, School of Earth Sciences (1994)
- Earth Sciences Teaching Award, School of Earth Sciences (1994)
- Distinguished Achievement Award for Petroleum Engineering Faculty, Society of Petroleum Engineers (1993)
- Distinguished Lecturer, Society of Petroleum Engineers (1989-1990)
