= Lucile Packard Children's Hospital =

Hospital in Palo Alto, California, U.S.

Lucile Packard Children's Hospital at Stanford
- Stanford Medicine

Geography
- Location: Palo Alto, California, United States
- Coordinates: 37°26′10″N 122°10′30″W

Organization
- Affiliated university: Stanford University School of Medicine

Services
- Emergency department: Level 1 Pediatric Trauma Centers
- Beds: 361

Helipads
- Helipad: FAA LID: 15CA (Shared with Stanford University Medical Center)
| Number | Length | | Surface |
| Number | ft | m | Surface |
|---|---|---|---|
| H1 | 48 x 48 | 15 × 15 | asphalt |

History
- Founded: 1991; 35 years ago

Links
- Website: http://www.stanfordchildrens.org/
- Lists: Hospitals in the United States
- Other links: Lucile Packard Foundation for Children's Health, Stanford University Medical Center

Lucile Packard Children's Hospital at Stanford (LPCH) is a nationally ranked women's and children's hospital which is affiliated with Stanford University Health system's branding structure. Lucile Packard Children's Hospital maintains independent governance, finances, licenses and legal identities which shows them as legally and operationally distinct from Stanford Health Care and is not a unified legal corporation and which is also stated on LPCH's own discharge paperwork with states it is an "independent nonprofit organization that is affiliated with but separate from Stanford University." The hospital is located adjacent to the campus at 725 Welch Road, Palo Alto, California. It was founded in 1991 and is staffed by over 650 physicians with 4,750 staff and volunteers. The hospital specializes in the care of infants, children, teens, young adults aged 0–21, but sometimes treats older adults and expectant mothers. Lucile Packard Children's Hospital is an ACS verified Level 1 regional pediatric trauma center, 1 of 7 in the state.

In November 2018, Paul King was appointed president and chief executive officer. King succeeds Christopher Dawes, who retired from the position in August 2018.

== History ==
Lucile Packard Children's Hospital at Stanford was founded in 1991 after a $40 million donation in 1986 from David and Lucile Packard, and since then LPCH has become one of the nation's most prominent children's hospitals. In 1996 LPCH merged with the Stanford University Medical Center, and the Lucile Packard Foundation for Children's Health was established as an independent public charity to ensure a continued source of dedicated funding and support for the health and well-being of children.

Lucile Packard Children's Hospital also hosts one of the centers for the study and treatment of Marfan syndrome in the USA. The hospital hosts the most extensive program for Marfan-related thoracic aneurysm in California and one of the largest in the country.

=== Modernization and expansion ===
On December 9, 2017, Lucile Packard Children's Hospital Stanford opened a new 521,000 square-foot building Main building and 3.5 acres of surrounding gardens and green space. The new building more than doubled the size of the existing pediatric and obstetric hospital campus, adding 149 patient beds for a total of 361 on the Palo Alto campus. Within the original building, now called the West building, design plans are underway for renovating the existing Johnson Center for Pregnancy and Newborn Services to create a dedicated mother and baby center.

Lucile Packard Children's Hospital Stanford's Main building is LEED Platinum certified by the U.S. Green Building Council (USGBC). It was the second children's hospital in the world to earn LEED Platinum status, the highest designation for sustainability awarded by the U.S. Green Building Council.

In November, 2019 neighboring Stanford Hospital expanded and moved their adult emergency department and trauma center to a new building. The move enabled LPCH to expand their pediatric emergency department.

== About ==
=== Patient Care Units ===
The hospital has multiple patient care units for patients of all ages.

- 36-bed Cardiovascular Intensive Care Unit (CVICU) - Cares for infants-adults with congenital or acquired heart disease.
- 36-bed Pediatric Intensive Care Unit (PICU) - Critically ill pediatric patients aged 0–21.
- 40-bed Level 4 Neonatal Intensive Care Unit (NICU) - Critically ill neonatal patients.
- 34-bed Level 2 Intermediate Care Nursery - Newborn general care.
- 27-bed Hematology and Oncology Unit - Cares for pediatric cancer, blood, and stem cell transplant patients.
- 26-bed Patient Care Unit 200 - Cares for infants-adults not ill enough for the CVICU.
- 26-bed Patient Care Unit 300 - Acute care pediatric unit.
- 25-bed Patient Care Unit 400 - Acute care pediatric unit.
- 101-bed General Pediatrics

=== Adult programs ===
In addition to their pediatric specialties, Lucile Packard Children's Hospital serves adults through a couple of their nationally recognized programs. LPCH has one of the largest adult congenital heart disease programs in the U.S. and also houses Stanford's maternity and labor and delivery units, providing gynecological and maternity care for women of all ages.

=== Ronald McDonald House ===
Right down the road from LPCH is the Ronald McDonald House of the Bay Area (RMDH). The RMDH at Stanford dates back to 1979 when the original house opened. In 2016 an expansion doubling the size was completed. The capacity went from 67 families a night to 123 families per night, added 50,000 square-feet, and cost $40.5 million. The house is the largest RMDH in the world and was designed by top interior designers from around the Bay Area. The house serves patients and families of infants, children, teens, and young adults age 0-21.

== Awards and recognition ==
Lucile Packard Children's Hospital Stanford is ranked as a top pediatric hospital in the nation by U.S. News & World Report with rankings in all 10 clinical specialty areas.

Lucile Packard Children's Hospital Stanford achieved Magnet recognition in 2019, the highest honor for nursing excellence. Just 8 percent of U.S. health care organizations out of more than 6,300 U.S. hospitals have achieved Magnet recognition.

For the fifth straight year, Stanford Children's Health and Lucile Packard Children's Hospital Stanford earned 2019 CHIME HealthCare's Most Wired recognition as a certified level 9 from the College of Healthcare Information Management Executives (CHIME).

LPCH wins the national award for Excellence in Pediatric Patient Care from the Child Health Corporation of America for outstanding rapid response performance.

In 2019 The National Organisation For Arts In Health awarded the new LPCH building its Hamilton Award for Recognition in the Arts Transforming Environments category, awarded for demonstrating the positive impact of artwork in a healthcare environment.

As of 2021 Lucile Packard Children's Hospital has placed nationally in all 10 ranked pediatric specialties on U.S. News & World Report, and placed 10 on the national honor roll list.

2021 U.S. News & World Report Rankings for Lucile Packard Children's Hospital
| Specialty | Rank (In the U.S.) | Score (Out of 100) |
|---|---|---|
| Neonatology | #3 | 94.7 |
| Pediatric Cancer | #16 | 82.6 |
| Pediatric Cardiology & Heart Surgery | #21 | 79.5 |
| Pediatric Diabetes & Endocrinology | #9 | 82.1 |
| Pediatric Gastroenterology & GI Surgery | #14 | 85.6 |
| Pediatric Nephrology | #4 | 92.5 |
| Pediatric Neurology & Neurosurgery | #8 | 88.7 |
| Pediatric Orthopedics | #30 | 69.2 |
| Pediatric Pulmonology & Lung Surgery | #6 | 92.1 |
| Pediatric Urology | #24 | 68.4 |

== See also ==
- David and Lucile Packard Foundation
- Packard Humanities Institute
- David Packard
- Susan Packard Orr
