= David Packard =

American electrical engineer (1912–1996)

- Packard c. 1962

13th United States Deputy Secretary of Defense
- In office January 24, 1969 – December 13, 1971
- President: Richard Nixon
- Preceded by: Paul Nitze
- Succeeded by: Kenneth Rush

Personal details
- Born: September 7, 1912 Pueblo, Colorado, U.S.
- Died: March 26, 1996 (aged 83) Stanford, California, U.S.
- Spouse: Lucile Salter (m. 1938; died 1987)
- Children: 4; including David Woodley, Susan and Julie
- Education: Stanford University
- Known for: Co-founder of Hewlett-Packard. Member of Trilateral Commission.
- Awards: Sylvanus Thayer Award (1982); Presidential Medal of Freedom (1988); Public Welfare Medal (1989)

David Packard (/ˈpækərd/ PAK-ərd; September 7, 1912 – March 26, 1996) was an American electrical engineer and co-founder, with Bill Hewlett, of Hewlett-Packard (1939), serving as president (1947–64), CEO (1964–68), and chairman of the board (1964–68, 1972–93) of HP. He served as U.S. Deputy Secretary of Defense from 1969 to 1971 during the Nixon administration. Packard served as president of the Uniformed Services University of the Health Sciences (USU) from 1976 to 1981 and chairman of its board of regents from 1973 to 1982. He was a member of the Trilateral Commission. Packard was the recipient of the Presidential Medal of Freedom in 1988 and is noted for many technological innovations and philanthropic endeavors.

== Personal life ==
Packard was born in Pueblo, Colorado, the son of Ella (Graber) and Sperry Sidney Packard, an attorney. He attended Centennial High School, where he early on exhibited interest in science, engineering, sports, and leadership. Packard earned his B.A. from Stanford University in 1934, as well as letters in football and basketball. He was also a member of the Phi Beta Kappa society and the Alpha Delta Phi Literary Fraternity. Packard also met his future wife Lucile Salter at Stanford, in addition to Bill Hewlett. Packard briefly attended the University of Colorado at Boulder before taking a position with the General Electric Company in Schenectady, New York. In 1938, he returned to Stanford, where he earned a master's degree in electrical engineering later that year. In the same year, he married Lucile Salter, with whom he had four children: David, Nancy, Susan, and Julie. Lucile Packard died in 1987 (age 72).

== Hewlett-Packard ==
In 1939, Packard and Hewlett established Hewlett-Packard (HP) in Packard's garage with an initial capital investment of $538 (equivalent to US$12,500 in 2025). Packard mentions in his book The HP Way that the name Hewlett-Packard was determined by the flip of a coin: HP, rather than PH. Their first product was an audio frequency oscillator, 8 of which were sold to Walt Disney Studios for testing sound equipment used to produce Fantasia.

The company grew into the world's largest producer of electronic testing and measurement devices. It also became a major producer of calculators, computers, and laser and ink jet printers.

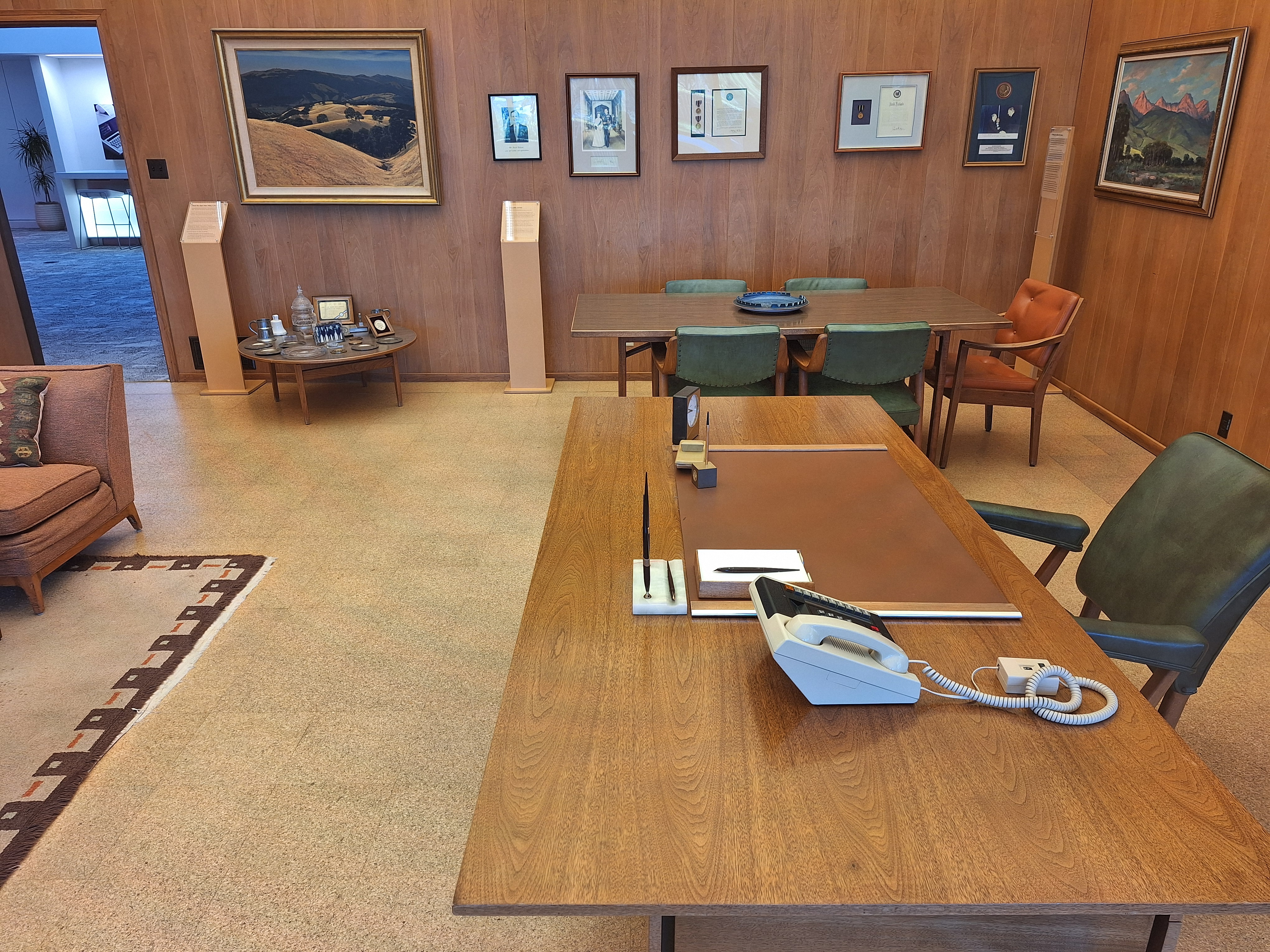
Packard's office at HP is preserved.

HP incorporated in 1947, with Packard becoming its first president, serving in that role until 1964. He was then elected chief executive officer and chairman of the board, holding those positions through 1968. Packard left HP in 1969 to serve in the Nixon administration until 1971, at which time he returned to HP and was re-elected chairman of the board, serving from 1972 to 1993. In 1991, Packard oversaw a major reorganization at HP. He retired from HP in 1993. At the time of his death in 1996, Packard's stake in the company was worth more than $1 billion.

Packard was criticized for expanding into South Africa, where HP equipment was used to implement apartheid. In 1980, he presided over the groundbreaking ceremony for HP's headquarters in Johannesburg. When Nebraska became the first US state government to divest from South Africa, Packard remarked "I'd rather lose business in Nebraska than with South Africa."

At Packard's instruction, the domain name "HP.com" was registered on March 3, 1986, and as such was one of the earliest to be registered.

== Department of Defense ==
Upon assuming the US presidency in 1969, Richard Nixon appointed Packard United States Deputy Secretary of Defense under Secretary of Defense Melvin Laird. Packard resigned in December 1971 and returned to Hewlett-Packard in 1972 as chairman of the board.

While serving in the Department of Defense (DoD), he brought concepts of resource management used in business to the military, as well as establishing the Defense Systems Management College. In 1970, Packard issued a memorandum that contained a number of major reforms designed to address "the real mess we have on our hands." A key reform was elimination of Robert MacNamara's Total Package Procurement except in rare situations.

Near the end of his time at the DoD, Packard wrote the "Packard Memo" or "Employment of Military Resources in the Event of Civil Disturbances". Enacted in February 1972, the act describes exceptions to the 1878 Posse Comitatus Act, which limited the powers of the federal government to use the U.S. military for law enforcement, except where expressly authorized by the Constitution or Act of Congress – noting that the Constitution provides an exception when needed "to prevent loss of life or wanton destruction of property and to restore governmental functioning and public order when sudden and unexpected civil disturbances, disasters, or calamities seriously endanger life and property and disrupt normal governmental functions to such an extent that duly constituted local authorities are unable to control the situations" and "to protect Federal property and Federal governmental functions when the need for protection exists and duly constituted local authorities are unable or decline to provide adequate protection". § 214.5 states that "employment of DoD military resources for assistance to civil authorities in controlling civil disturbances will normally be predicated upon the issuance of a Presidential Executive order or Presidential directive authorizing", with exceptions "limited to:

1. Cases of sudden and unexpected emergencies as described in §215.4(c)(1)(i), which require that immediate military action be taken.
2. Providing military resources to civil authorities as prescribed in §215.9 of this part."

According to Lindorff, these exceptions reinstate the possibility of martial law in the U.S., prohibited since 1878.

In the 1970s and 1980s Packard was a prominent advisor to the White House on defense procurement and management. He served as chairman of The Business Council in 1973 and 1974. Packard served on the Board of Directors of the Committee on the Present Danger, established in 1976, and in March 1982 he was appointed to President Reagan's "White House Science Council". From 1985 to 1986, he served as chairman of The Packard Commission.

== Philanthropy ==
From the early 1980s until his death in 1996, Packard dedicated much of his time and money to philanthropic projects. In 1964, Packard and his wife had established the David and Lucile Packard Foundation. In 1986, they donated $40 million toward building what became the Lucile Packard Children's Hospital at Stanford University; the new hospital opened in June 1991. Prompted by his daughters Nancy and Julie, in 1978 David and Lucile had created the Monterey Bay Aquarium Foundation. The couple eventually donated $55 million to build the new aquarium, which opened in 1984 with Julie Packard as its executive director. In 1987, Packard gave $13 million to create the Monterey Bay Aquarium Research Institute. Packard and Hewlett made a combined donation of $77 million to Stanford in 1994, for which the university named the David Packard Electrical Engineering Building in his honor.

Packard was a member of the American Enterprise Institute's board of trustees. He died on March 26, 1996, at age 83 in Stanford, California, leaving approximately $4 billion (the bulk of his estate) to the David and Lucile Packard Foundation, including large amounts of valuable real property in Los Altos Hills. All three Packard daughters sit on the foundation's board of trustees. David Woodley Packard, his son, serves as president of the Packard Humanities Institute.

As of 2025, the David and Lucile Packard Foundation has provided $1.2 billion to ocean research and is the leading private benefactor globally.

== Honors ==
- Golden Plate Award of the American Academy of Achievement (1969)
- IEEE Founders Medal along with William R. Hewlett. (1973)
- Gold Medal from National Football Foundation and Hall of Fame. (1975)
- Vermilye Medal from the Franklin Institute (1975)
- Sylvanus Thayer Award from the United States Military Academy (1982)
- Francis Boyer Award from the American Enterprise Institute (1986)
- Vannevar Bush Award (1987)
- Junior Achievement U.S. Business Hall of Fame (1988)
- National Medal of Technology (1988)
- Presidential Medal of Freedom (1988)
- Member of the American Academy of Arts and Sciences (1988)
- Public Welfare Medal from the National Academy of Sciences (1989)
- Member of the American Philosophical Society (1989)
- Lemelson-MIT Prize (1995)
- Bower Award in Business Leadership, both from the Franklin Institute (1996)
- Heinz Award Chairman's Medal along with William R. Hewlett. (1997)
- Member of the California Hall of Fame (2006)
- Entrepreneur Walk of Fame (2011)
- The "David Packard" Lecture at the Uniformed Services University of the Health Sciences (USU)
- David Packard Hall at USU

Packard's old home and garage in Palo Alto, California were placed on the California registry of historic places as "The Birthplace of Silicon Valley". He also had an oil tanker named for him. The David Packard, built in 1977, was operated for Chevron, had a capacity 406,592 long tons deadweight (DWT) and was registered under the Bahamian flag. In 2021, MBARI built a new research vessel named R/V David Packard in honor of him as their founder.

== See also ==
- Committee on the Present Danger
- David and Lucile Packard Foundation
- The HP Way business philosophy
- List of wealthiest foundations
- Trilateral Commission

== Notes ==
Business positions
New title	President of Hewlett-Packard; 1947–71	Succeeded by William Hewlett
New title	Chief Executive Officer of Hewlett-Packard; 1964–71	Succeeded by William Hewlett
New title	Chairman of Hewlett-Packard; 1964–93	Succeeded by Lewis E. Platt
Political offices
Preceded by Paul Nitze	United States Deputy Secretary of Defense; 1969–71	Succeeded by Kenneth Rush
