= Mary Pickford Theater =

Coordinates: 38.88702°N 77.00515°W

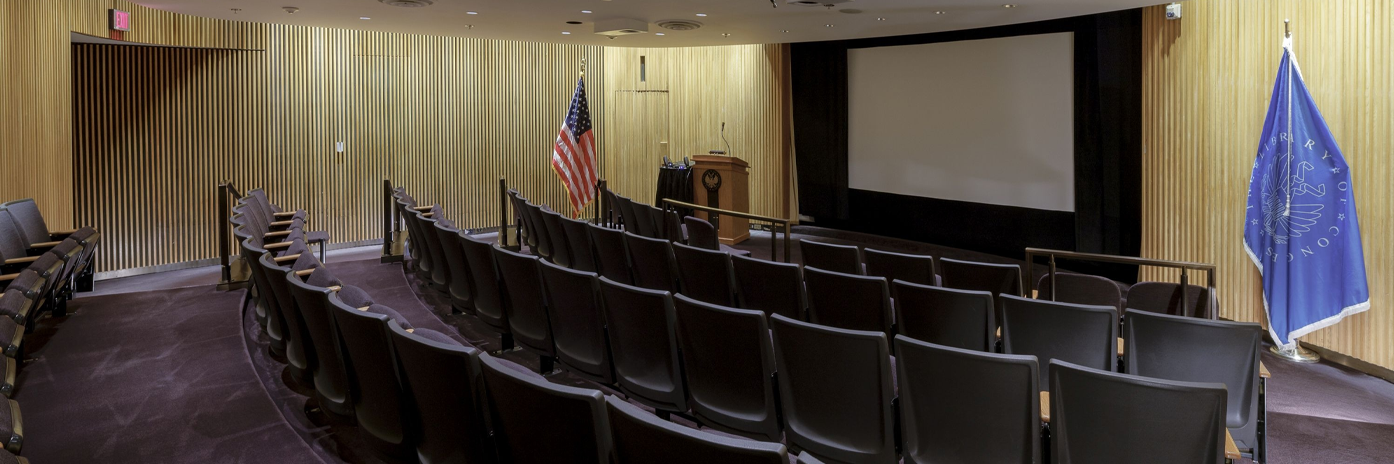
Mary Pickford Theatre, James Madison Memorial Building, Library of Congress

The Mary Pickford Theater, named in honor of silent film star Mary Pickford, is a 64-seat theater on the third floor of the Library of Congress James Madison Memorial Building in Washington, D.C.

The theater screens classic and contemporary movies, often offering film series organized by theme. All screenings are free, though reservations must be made, as the theater is small.

Upcoming screenings are advertised on the Library's website.
