= Stanford University Medical Center =

Private hospital affiliated with Stanford University School of Medicine

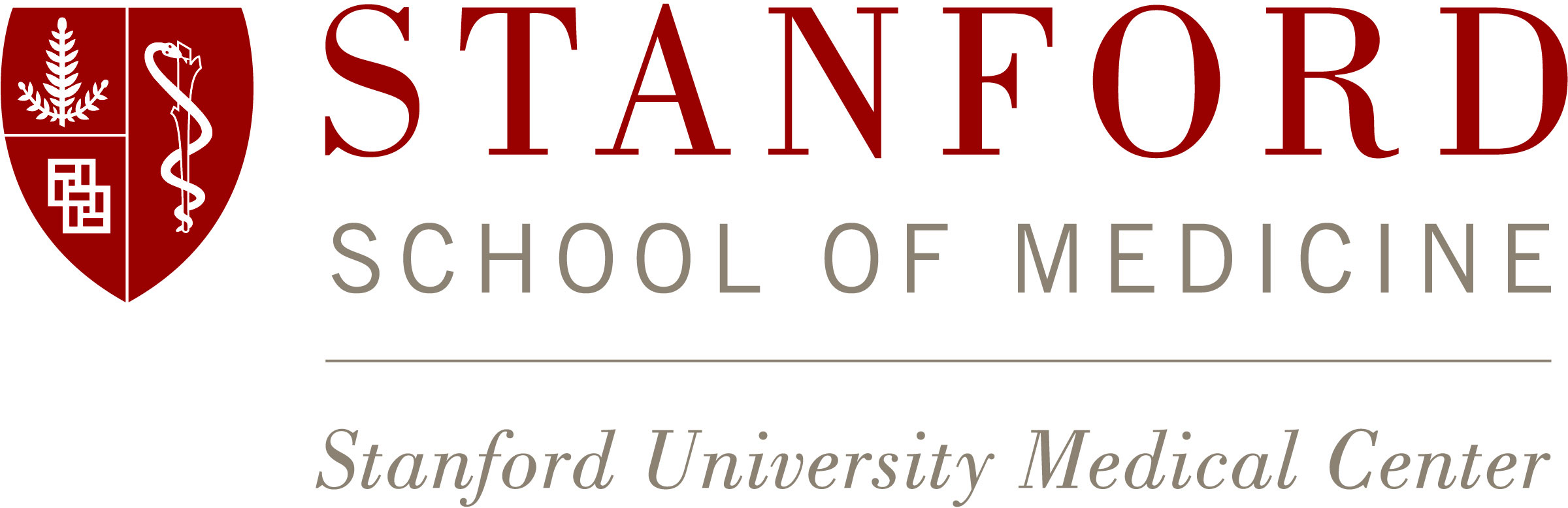

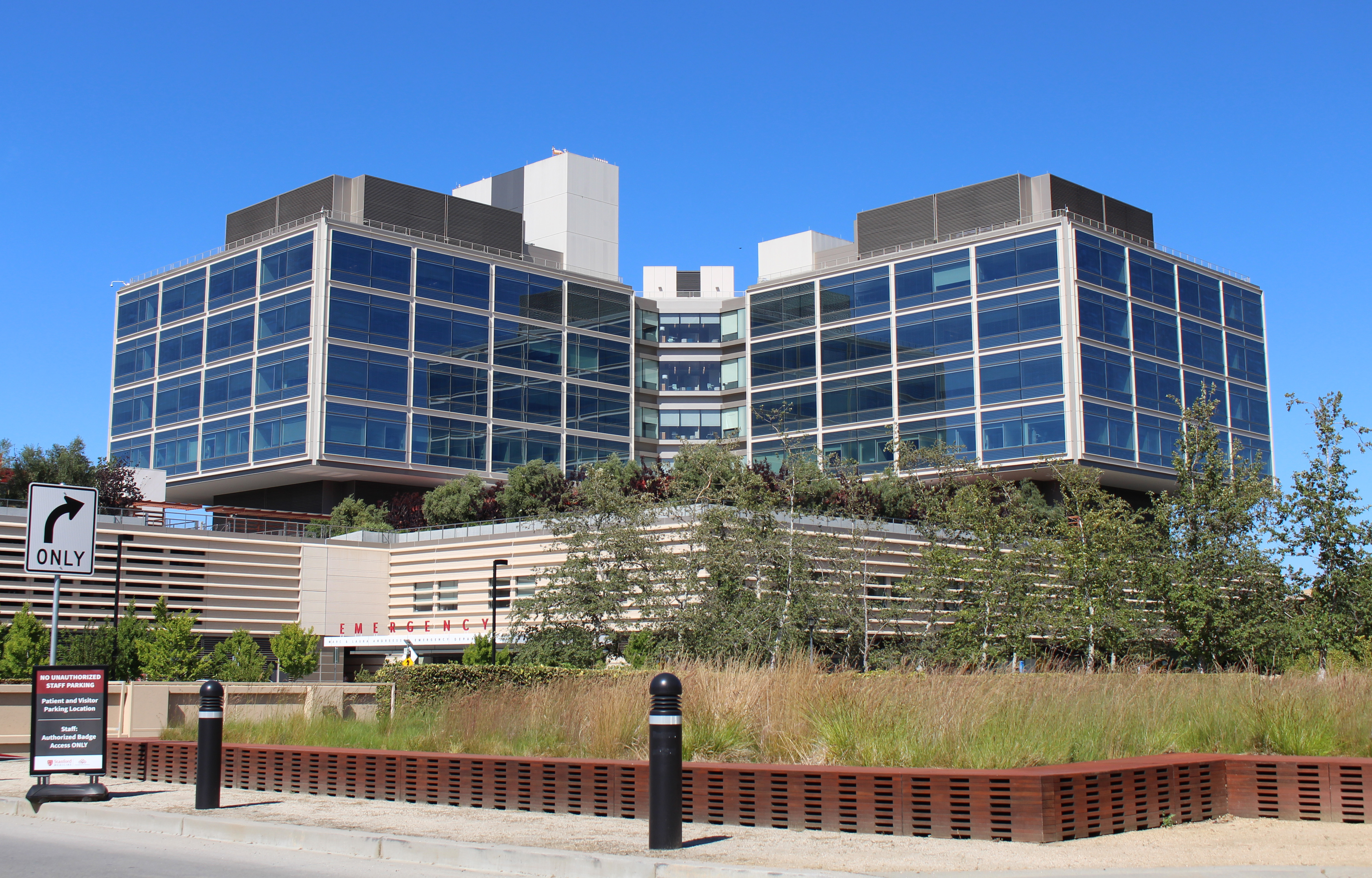
- The new Stanford Hospital inpatient facility (opened 2019)

Geography
- Location: 500 Pasteur Dr. Stanford, California, United States
- Coordinates: 37.434°N 122.175°W

Organization
- Care system: Private
- Type: Academic
- Affiliated university: Stanford University School of Medicine

Services
- Standards: Tertiary Care
- Emergency department: Level I trauma center
- Beds: 613

History
- Former name: Stanford Home for Convalescent Children
- Opened: 1911

Links
- Website: med.stanford.edu
- Lists: Hospitals in California
- Other links: List of hospitals in the United States

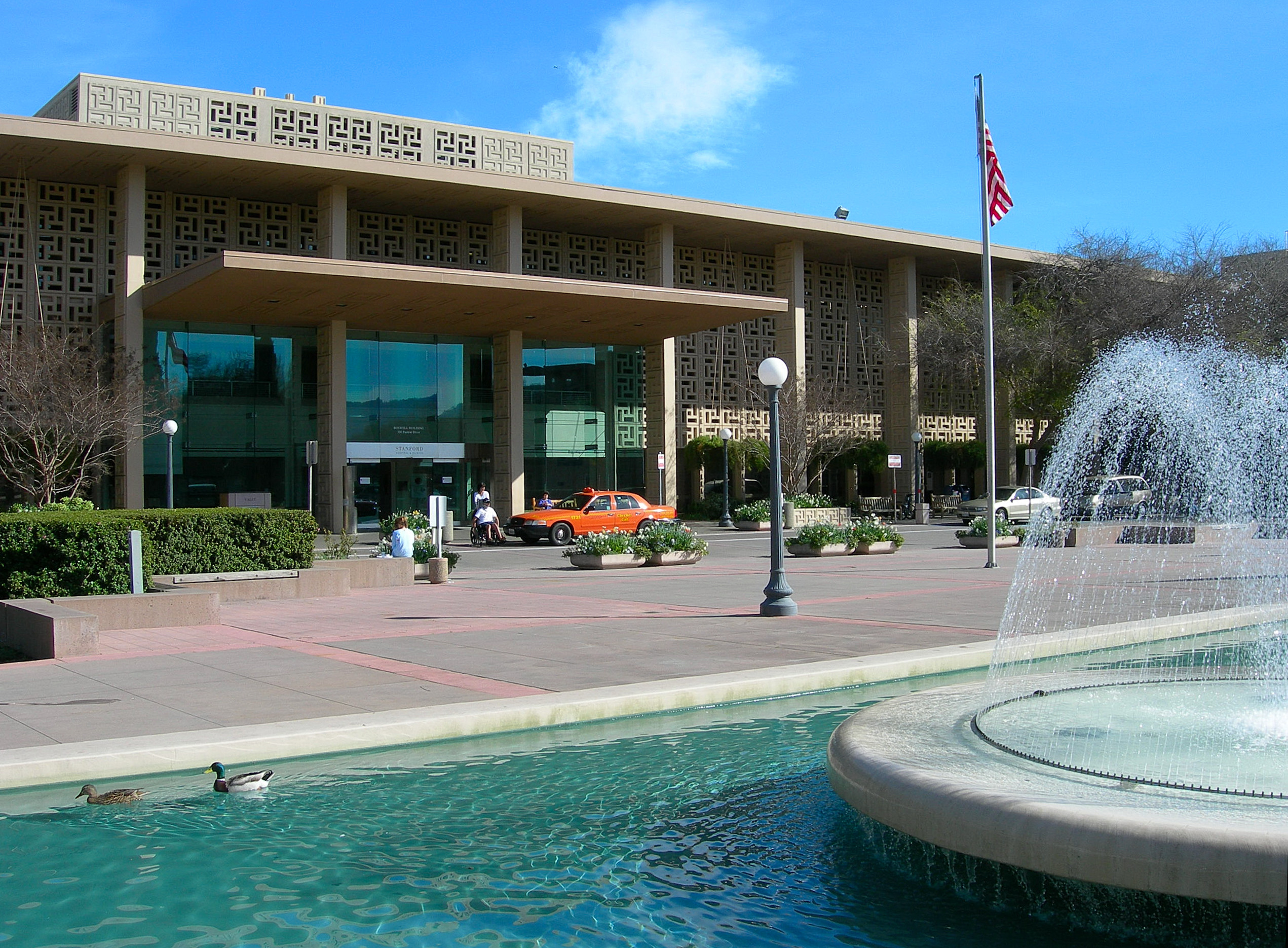
Main entrance to original inpatient facility

Stanford University Medical Center is an American teaching hospital which includes Stanford Health Care and Stanford Children's Health. It serves as a private hospital for the Stanford University School of Medicine. In 2022–23, it was ranked by the U.S. News as the 3rd-best hospital in California (behind Cedars-Sinai Medical Center and UCLA Medical Center) and 10th-best in the country.

== Stanford Hospital ==
Stanford Health Care is located at 500 Pasteur Drive, Stanford, California. The main hospital building and the Hoover Pavilion are within the city limits of Palo Alto. It is consistently ranked as one of the best hospitals in the United States by U.S. News & World Report and serves as the primary teaching hospital for the Stanford University School of Medicine. The facility, located at the north end of the university campus, includes the main hospital building, Stanford Comprehensive Cancer Center, Blake Wilbur Building, Boswell Building, Hoover Pavilion, Neurosciences Health Center, and the Department of Psychiatry & Behavioral Sciences building, as well as miscellaneous professional offices & departments of the School of Medicine and Stanford Health Care, plus the recent expansions. The roof of the main building contains a landing facility and Life Flight helicopter.

Stanford Health Care provides both general acute care services and tertiary medical care for patients locally, nationally and internationally. Organ transplantation, cancer diagnosis and treatment, cardiovascular medicine and surgery, and neurosciences are clinical specialties of worldwide renown. Among its many achievements, the first combined heart-lung transplant in the world was successfully completed at Stanford University Medical Center in 1981. The hospital plays a key role in the training of physicians and other medical professionals. It provides a clinical environment for the medical school's researchers as they study ways to translate new knowledge into effective patient care. Full-time Stanford faculty and community physicians make up the hospital medical staff.

Stanford Hospital is home to a Level I trauma center. It became a trauma center in 1986 and first received American College of Surgeons certification as a Level I trauma center in 1998.

=== History ===
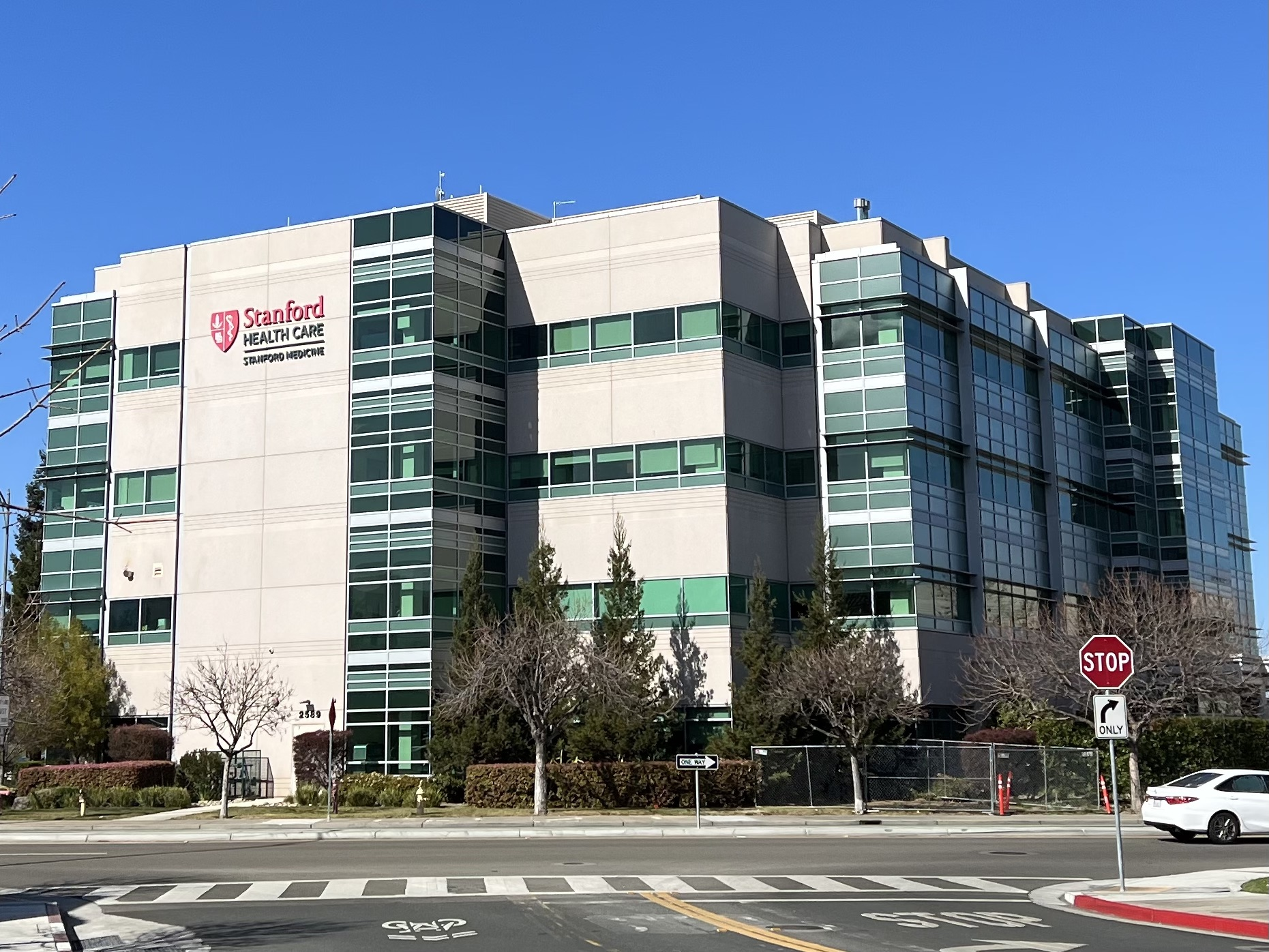
Stanford Cancer Center in San Jose

The hospital's history began with the foundation of the Stanford Home for Convalescent Children (the "Con Home") in 1911. When the Stanford Medical School moved south from San Francisco in 1959, the Stanford Hospital was established and was co-owned with the city of Palo Alto; it was then known as Palo Alto-Stanford Hospital Center. It was purchased by the university in 1968 and renamed.

The Beckman Center for Molecular and Genetic Medicine opened in 1989; the Lucile Packard Children's Hospital at Stanford opened in 1991; the Richard M. Lucas Center for Magnetic Resonance Spectroscopy and Imaging opened in 1992. In 1999, Stanford University approved a $185 million, five-year plan to improve the 40-year-old School of Medicine facility. The Center for Clinical Sciences Research (CCSR) opened in 2000. The Clark Center for interdisciplinary research and bioengineering opened in 2004.

In 2009, the Stanford outpatient clinics, which were running out of expansion room, were relocated to the Stanford Medicine Outpatient Center, a large new site in Redwood City, California formerly occupied by the corporate headquarters of Excite@Home. The buildings were extensively remodeled for medical use to provide facilities the clinics' old homes lacked. For example, the Sleep Medicine Center's new sleep lab has thorough soundproofing and can accommodate a few morbidly obese patients. In 2018, these outpatient facilities were expanded to receive the main campuses outgoing Digestive Health Center and endoscopy suite, to make room for the new expansions/renovations at the main Stanford Hospital, in addition to nearly doubling the existing imaging facilities and adding an external parking structure at the Stanford Outpatient Center.

The inpatient facilities remain on the main campus, which as of 2019, has undergone another round of major expansions, renovations, and revitalization, including a new inpatient structure, renovation of the old inpatient building, renovations of the Cancer Center and Blake Wilbur Building, and new emergency facilities, all located on a plot adjacent to the existing hospital. These major renovations are part of Stanford University's long-term master planning for renovation and medical advancement, which have included past projects such as the Lucile Salter Packard Children's Hospital at Stanford and the Stanford Neurosciences Health Center.

==== Life Flight ====
The Stanford Life Flight program began May 1, 1984. Its aircraft is an EC 145 helicopter that can fly under both visual and instrument flight rules, allowing for response to calls in nearly any weather. The aircraft accommodates two patients with two flight nurses, or one patient with up to four caregivers, plus the pilot.

=== Staff ===
The hospital's medical staff numbers 1,910 with an additional 850 interns and residents, as well as nearly 1,500 registered nurses and approximately 610 licensed beds. Stanford Clinics, the group practice of most faculty physicians of Stanford University School of Medicine, includes 493 full-time faculty physicians. Their areas of expertise range from primary care to the most advanced medical and surgical specialties. Stanford Clinics offer more than 100 specialty and subspecialty service areas. Under the supervision of faculty physicians, Stanford medical students and residents participate in patient care in most specialties. The clinics participate in preferred provider health care programs as well as Medicare and MediCal.

=== Recognition ===
Stanford University Medical Center is world-renowned for its work in cardiovascular medicine and cardiothoracic surgery, organ transplantation, neurology, neurosurgery, and cancer medicine. It has over 100,000 emergency department visits per year. In 2017, Stanford Hospital was ranked by U.S. News & World Report as the 9th-best hospital out of 5,462 medical centers in the United States, and third in the West Coast after the UCSF Medical Center and the UCLA Medical Center. As of 2018, Stanford received high rankings in the following specialties:

Specialty	Ranking
Otolaryngology – head and neck surgery	#2
Cancer	#14
Cardiology & Heart surgery	#13
Orthopedics	#13
Urology	#17
Gynecology	#23
Nephrology	#10
Neurology & Neurosurgery	#14
Pulmonology	#37
Gastroenterology & GI surgery	#27
Geriatrics	#25
Diabetes & Endocrinology	#17

== Lucile Packard Children's Hospital ==
Lucile Packard Children's Hospital at Stanford (LPCH) is a nationally ranked women's and children's hospital which is part of the Stanford University Health system. The hospital is located adjacent to the campus at 725 Welch Road, Palo Alto, California. It was founded in 1991 and is staffed by over 650 physicians with 4,750 staff and volunteers. The hospital specializes in the care of infants, children, teens, young adults aged 0–21, but sometimes treats older adults and expectant mothers. Lucile Packard Children's Hospital is an ACS verified Level 1 regional pediatric trauma center, 1 of 7 in the state.
