= Packard Humanities Institute =

American non-profit foundation

- The PHI Stoa in Santa Clarita, California
- Formation: 1987
- Type: NGO
- Legal status: foundation
- Purpose: Humanities Research
- Location: Los Altos, California, United States
- President: David Woodley Packard
- Revenue: $7,590,051 (2015)
- Expenses: $20,924,436 (2015)
- Website: www.packhum.org

The Packard Humanities Institute (PHI) is a non-profit foundation, established in 1987, and located in Los Altos, California, which funds projects in a wide range of conservation concerns in the fields of archaeology, music, film preservation, and historic conservation, plus Greek epigraphy, with an aim to create tools for basic research in the Humanities.

== History ==
Over the years, it has created databases on Latin literature, Bible texts, texts in Arabic and Coptic, Ancient Greek papyri and inscriptions, Founding Fathers of the United States: Benjamin Franklin and others, and also Persian literature in translation. It also funds external projects such as the Dictionary of Medieval Latin from British Sources and the complete works of C.P.E. Bach.

PHI is also concerned with early education of children. The institute is independent of the David and Lucile Packard Foundation and is not associated in any way with any Hewlett-Packard Company foundations.

Its current president is former professor David Woodley Packard, who has served as a director, but never an officer, of Hewlett Packard.

== National Audio-Visual Conservation Center ==
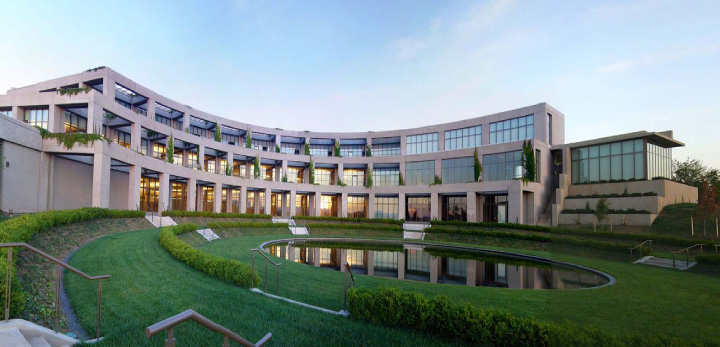
Packard Campus for Audio-Visual Conservation

In 1997 with the approval of the United States Congress the David and Lucile Packard Foundation purchased the former high-security storage facility operated by the Federal Reserve Board. The facility is located inside Mount Pony in Culpeper, Virginia. With Congress and the Library of Congress the facility was transformed into the National Audio-Visual Conservation Center, which completed construction in mid-2007, called the Packard Campus (PCAVC). The Library of Congress Packard Campus for Audio Visual Conservation is a facility funded as a gift to the nation by the Packard Humanities Institute. The Packard Campus is the site where the nation's library acquires, preserves and provides access to the world's largest and most comprehensive collection of motion pictures, television programs, radio broadcasts and sound recordings. The Packard Campus is home to nearly 7 million collection items. It provides staff support for the Library of Congress National Film Preservation Board, the National Film Preservation Board and the national registries for film and recorded sound.

== Restoration of historic theaters ==
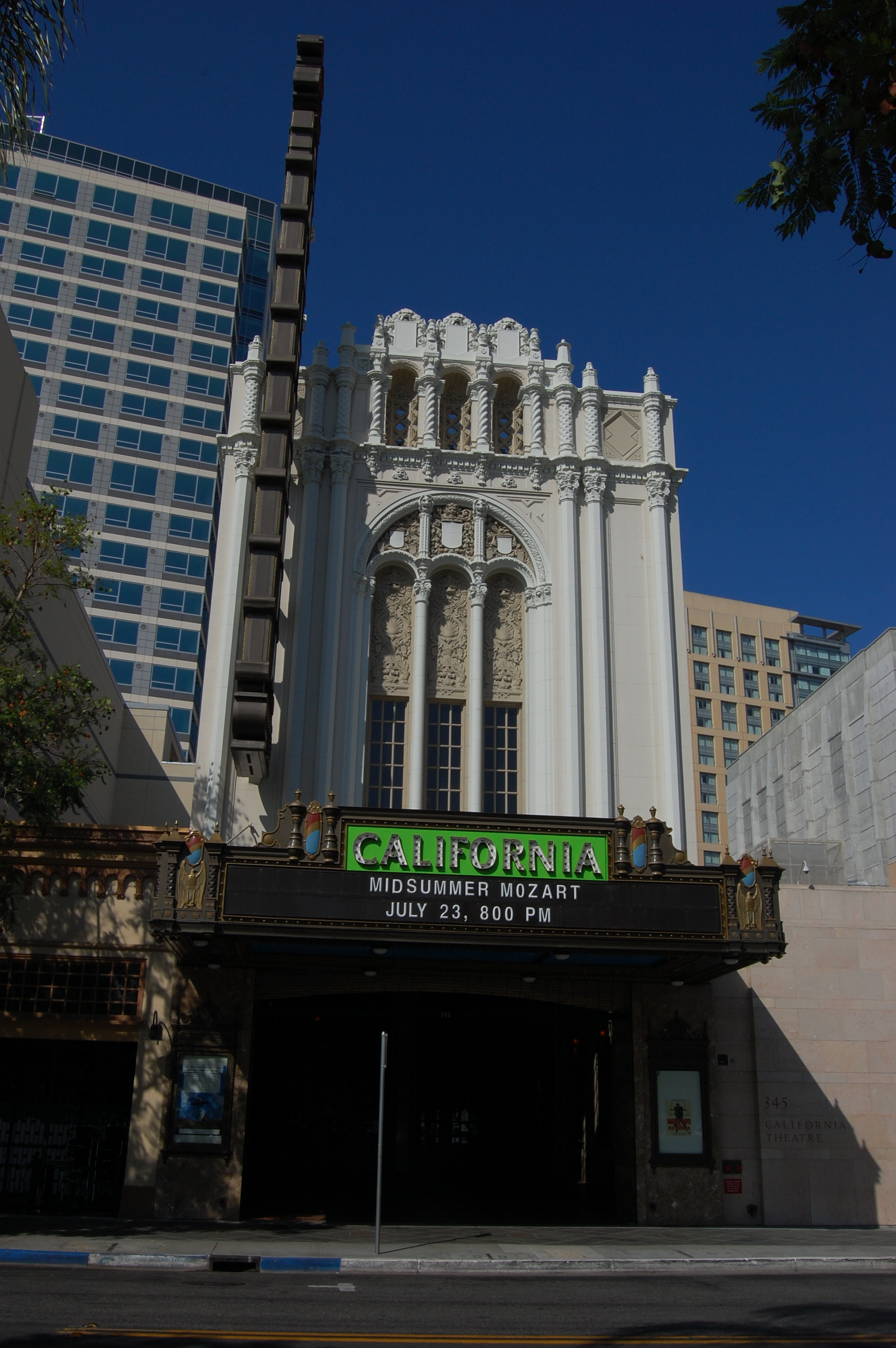
The historic California Theatre, (Fox Theatre)

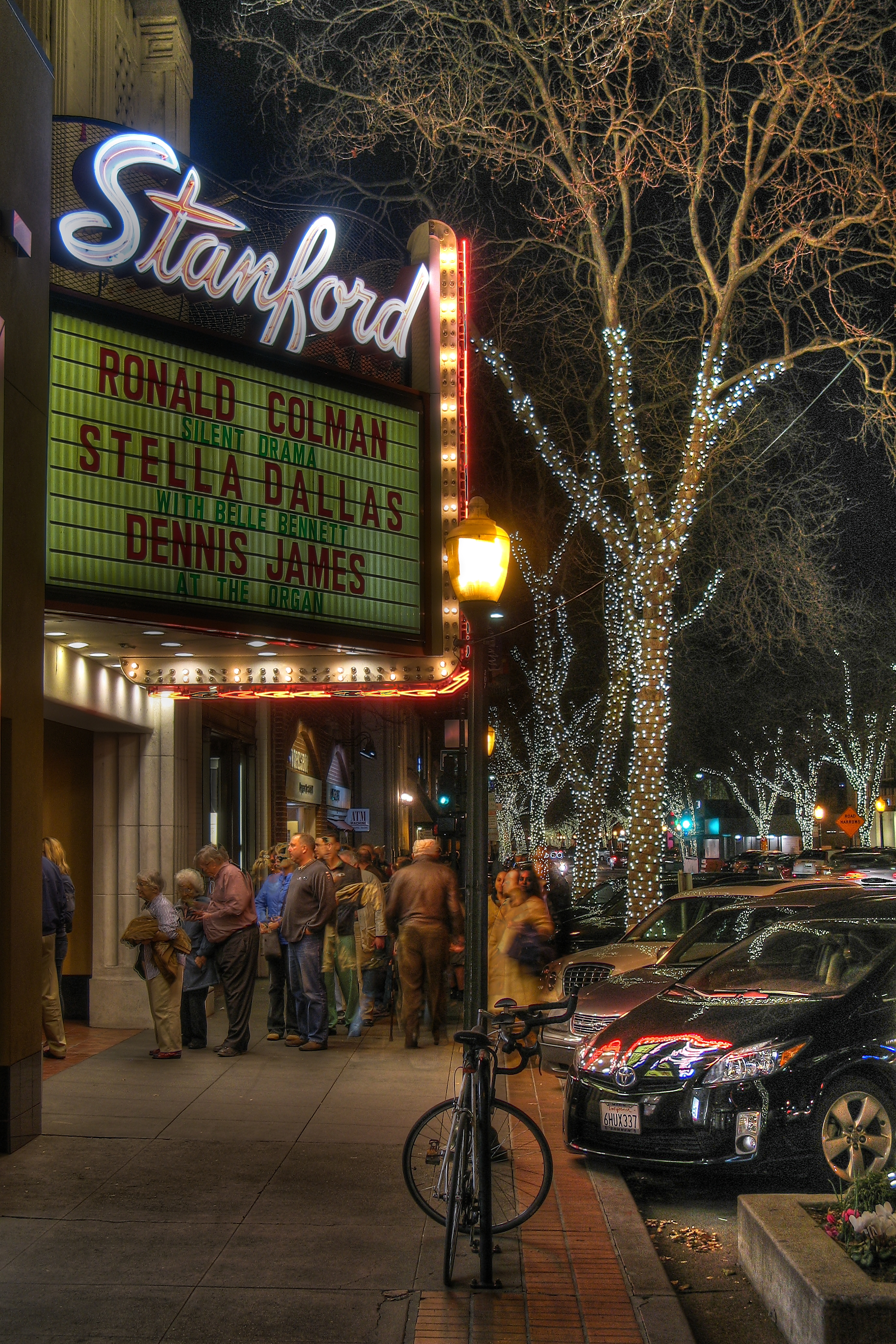
Stanford Theatre, Palo Alto California

PHI has worked on the restoration of two historic theaters:

- San Jose, California Fox Theatres, that is now the new home of the Opera San José. Opened 1927 the San Jose Fox closed in 1973. PHI renovated and reopened in it in 2004. Now called the California Theater.
- PHI worked on the restoration of the historic Stanford Theatre. Designed by architects Weeks and Day, the theater was originally opened in 1925. In 1987 it was purchased and restored by the David and Lucile Packard Foundation. It is currently operated by the Stanford Theatre Foundation, led by David Woodley Packard.

== Packard Humanities Institute, Santa Clarita ==
Using the experience and knowledge of helping make the Packard Campus (PCAVC), Packard started a new project in Santa Clarita. Opened in 2014, Packard Humanities Institute in Santa Clarita, California has film vaults for media preservation. The facility has one of the most modern vaults for the storage of nitrate film. The exterior of the facility is ancient Greek architecture made with Italian marble. The interior is made in the style of San Marco, Florence monastery. Packard Humanities Institute in Santa Clarita is partnering with the UCLA Film and Television Archive and UCLA School of Theater, Film and Television in the preservation for both the UCLA and Packard Humanities film library. PHI Santa Clarita also holds 400,000 archive films from Paramount Pictures, Warner Brothers, Columbia Pictures, 20th Century Fox and Republic Pictures. PHI Santa Clarita also holds and is transferring the Hearst Metrotone News collection, newsreels made from 1915 to 1975, on a Scanity motion picture film scanner.

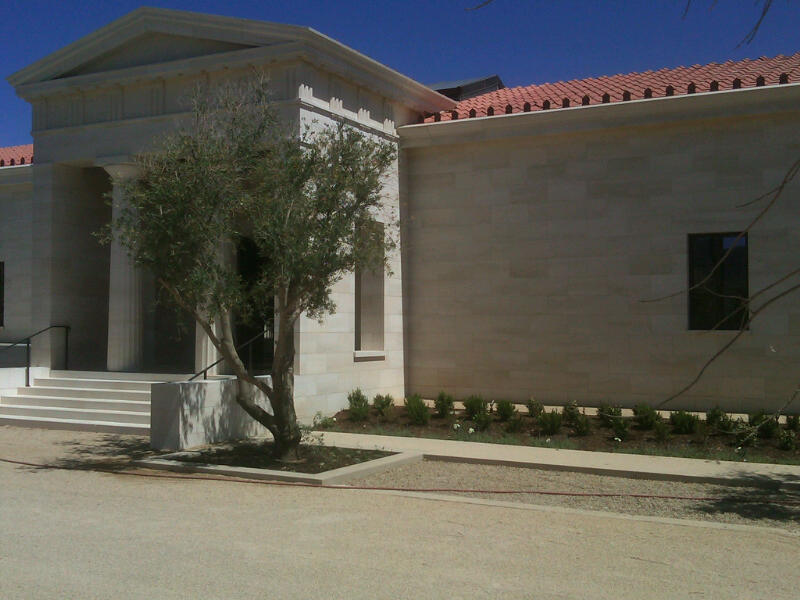
Packard Humanities Institute, Santa Clarita

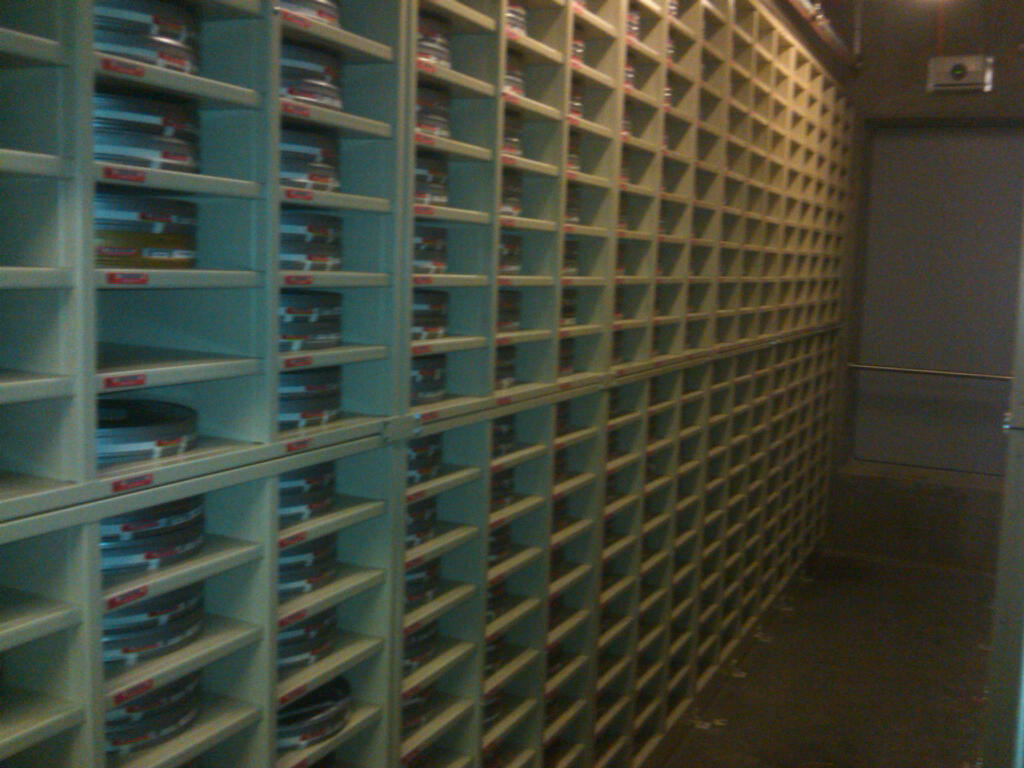
PHI Santa Clarita, Film Vault

== Packard Humanities Institute Collection ==
Since 2010, the Packard Humanities Institute Collection has been held at the Academy Film Archive. This collection is the largest known assemblage of theatrical trailers on film, consisting of over 60,000 coming attractions, advertisements, theatrical snipes, film excerpts, television spots, and public service announcements.

== See also ==
- David and Lucile Packard Foundation
- Lucile Packard Children's Hospital
- Monterey Bay Aquarium
- Monterey Bay Aquarium Research Institute
