= David and Lucile Packard Foundation =

Private foundation that provides grants to not-for-profit organizations

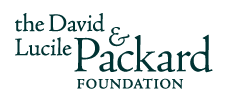
- Organization logo

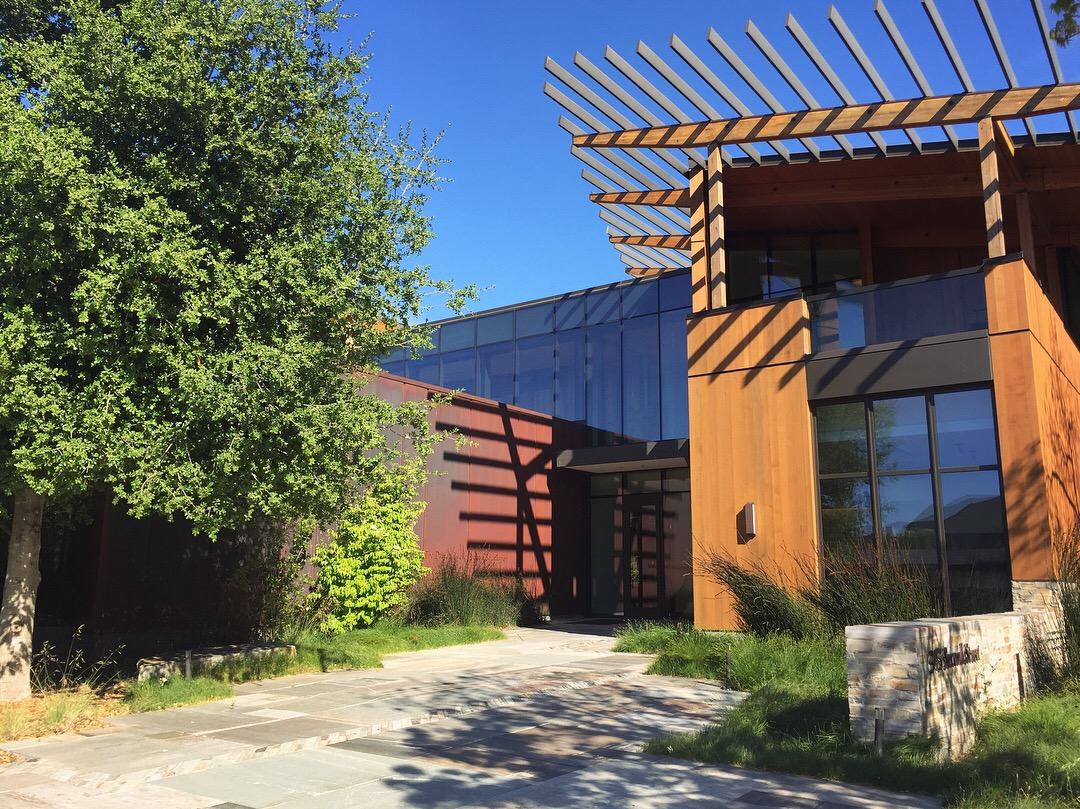
- Headquarters entrance
- Founded: 1964
- Founder: David Packard and Lucile Salter Packard
- Location: Los Altos, California
- Key people: Carol S. Larson, President and CEO; David Orr, Chairman
- Revenue: $536,372,952 (2017)
- Expenses: $380,569,988 (2017)
- Endowment: $7.1 billion Endowment value as of December 31, 2014.
- Website: www.packard.org

The David and Lucile Packard Foundation is a private foundation that provides grants to not-for-profit organizations. It was created in 1964 by David Packard (co-founder of HP) and his wife Lucile Salter Packard. Following David Packard's death in 1996, the Foundation became the beneficiary of part of his estate.

The foundation's goals, through the use of grants, are to "improve the lives of children, enable creative pursuit of science, advance reproductive health, and conserve and restore earth's natural systems." As of 2016, The David and Lucile Packard Foundation was the 20th wealthiest foundation in the United States.

== Financials ==
As of December 2015, the Foundation's investment portfolio totaled $6.7 billion. General program grant awards for 2015 totaled $307 million.

According to the OECD, the David and Lucile Packard Foundation provided US$122.9 million for development in 2018, all of which was related to its grant-making activities.

== Areas of funding ==
The majority of grants are distributed among four main program areas: Conservation and Science; Population and Reproductive Health; Children, Families, and Communities; and Local Grantmaking. The Foundation also deploys Mission Investments to expand the impact of grantmaking by making loans and equity investments to further programmatic goals.

=== Conservation and Science ===
The Conservation and Science program invests in actions and ideas that conserve and restore ecosystems while enhancing human well-being.

It promotes effective management of fisheries and an end to both overfishing and destructive fishing methods. It promotes sustainability in coastal systems in three specific locations: California's coast, the Gulf of California, and the Western Pacific. It funds marine research and management for coastal-marine systems. It supports energy policy reforms and research in the United States, China, and the Amazon. The program also provides academic grants for university researchers.

The foundation also funds the Monterey Bay Aquarium Research Institute, an oceanography research center, and the Center for Ocean Solutions, which brings together marine science and policy to develop solutions to the challenges facing the ocean.

=== Population and Reproductive Health ===
The Foundation supports programs that promote the rights of individuals to make educated decisions about family planning. The program is focused specifically (but not exclusively) on Ethiopia, Rwanda, Democratic Republic of the Congo, India, and the southern United States.

=== Children, Families, and Communities ===
The Children, Families, and Communities program area is focused on providing early education through the Preschool for California's Children program. The program area also supports Health Insurance for all children and after-school programs for elementary and middle school students in California.

=== Local Grantmaking ===
The Local Grantmaking Program makes investments in the five contiguous counties of San Mateo, Santa Clara, Santa Cruz, San Benito and Monterey—as well as Pueblo, Colorado, the birthplace of David Packard.

== Packard Fellowships for Science and Engineering ==
Established in 1988, the annual Packard Fellowship for Science and Engineering is the largest award given to young faculty in STEM fields, and is widely regarded as one of the most prestigious awards given to junior faculty members. Fellows receive an award of $875,000, distributed over five years, which has "no strings attached" and are designed to provide maximum flexibility in pursuing new scientific questions and frontiers in their fields of study. Each year, the Foundation invites the presidents of 50 universities to nominate two early-career professors each from their institutions. An advisory panel of distinguished scientists and engineers carefully reviews the nominations and selects roughly 18 Fellows to receive individual grants of $875,000, distributed over five years.

Packard Fellows' work has contributed to breakthroughs like the creation of the CRISPR-Cas9 gene-editing technique, the discovery of soft tissues in dinosaur fossils, and the first-ever observation of a neutron star collision. Fellows have gone on to receive a range of accolades, including Nobel Prizes in Chemistry and Physics, the Fields Medal, the Alan T. Waterman Award, elections to the National Academies, and MacArthur, Sloan, Searle, and Guggenheim fellowships.

== See also ==
- David Packard
- Packard Humanities Institute
- List of wealthiest foundations
- David and Lucile Packard Foundation Headquarters
- William and Flora Hewlett Foundation, endowed by another HP cofounder.
