= Analog signal =

Continuous time-varying signal

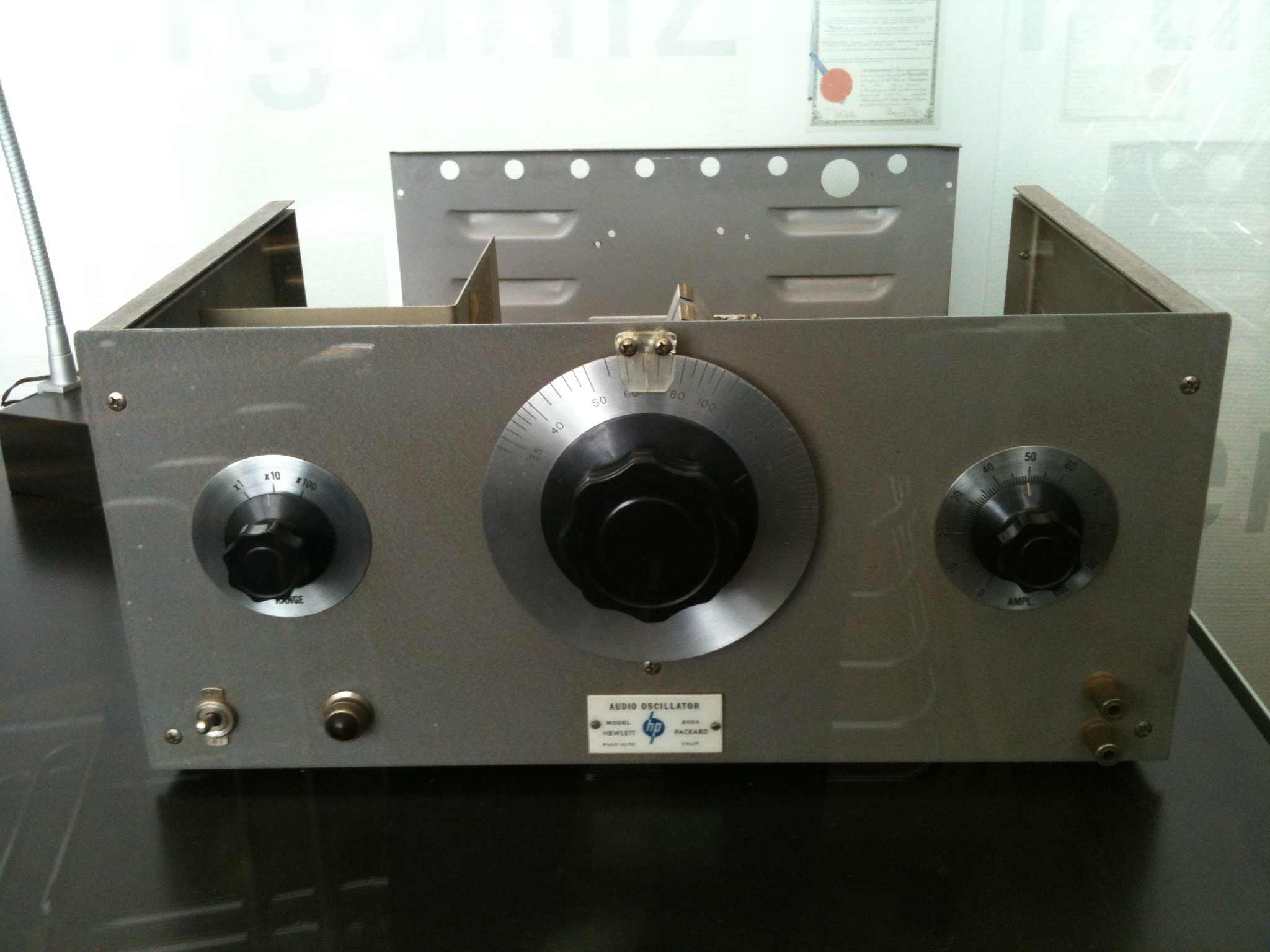
HP 200A analog audio oscillator

An analog signal (American English) or analogue signal (British and Commonwealth English) is any signal, typically a continuous-time signal, representing some other quantity, i.e., analogous to another quantity. For example, in an analog audio signal, the instantaneous signal voltage varies in a manner analogous to the pressure of the sound waves.

In contrast, a digital signal represents the original time-varying quantity as a sampled sequence of quantized numeric values, typically but not necessarily in the form of a binary value. Digital sampling imposes some bandwidth and dynamic range constraints on the representation and adds quantization noise.

The term analog signal usually refers to electrical signals; however, mechanical, pneumatic, hydraulic, and other systems may also convey or be considered analog signals.

== Representation ==
An analog signal uses some property of the medium to convey the signal's information. For example, an aneroid barometer uses rotary position as the signal to convey pressure information. In an electrical signal, the voltage, current, or frequency of the signal may be varied to represent the information.

Any information may be conveyed by an analog signal; such a signal may be a measured response to changes in a physical variable, such as sound, light, temperature, position, or pressure. The physical variable is converted to an analog signal by a transducer. For example, sound striking the diaphragm of a microphone induces corresponding fluctuations in the current produced by a coil in an electromagnetic microphone or the voltage produced by a condenser microphone. The voltage or the current is said to be an analog of the sound.

== Noise ==
An analog signal is subject to electronic noise and distortion introduced by communication channels, recording and signal processing operations, which can progressively degrade the signal-to-noise ratio (SNR). As the signal is transmitted, copied, or processed, the unavoidable noise introduced in the signal path will accumulate as a generation loss, progressively and irreversibly degrading the SNR, until in extreme cases, the signal can be overwhelmed. Noise can show up as hiss and intermodulation distortion in audio signals, or snow in video signals. Generation loss is irreversible as there is no reliable method to distinguish the noise from the signal. Note that, despite a popular misconception, analog representations do not provide "infinite" resolution or accuracy, due to this inevitable presence of noise (and therefore error) in any real-world system.

Converting an analog signal to digital form introduces a low-level quantization noise into the signal due to finite resolution of digital systems. Once in digital form, the signal can be transmitted, stored, and processed without introducing additional noise or distortion using error detection and correction.

Noise accumulation in analog systems can be minimized by electromagnetic shielding, balanced lines, low-noise amplifiers and high-quality electrical components.

== See also ==
- Amplifier
- Analog computer
- Analog device
- Analogue electronics
- Analog signal processing
- Magnetic tape
- Preamplifier
