= Hewlett-Packard =

American information technology company (1939–2015)

Hewlett-Packard Company
- Logo used from 1979 to 2010

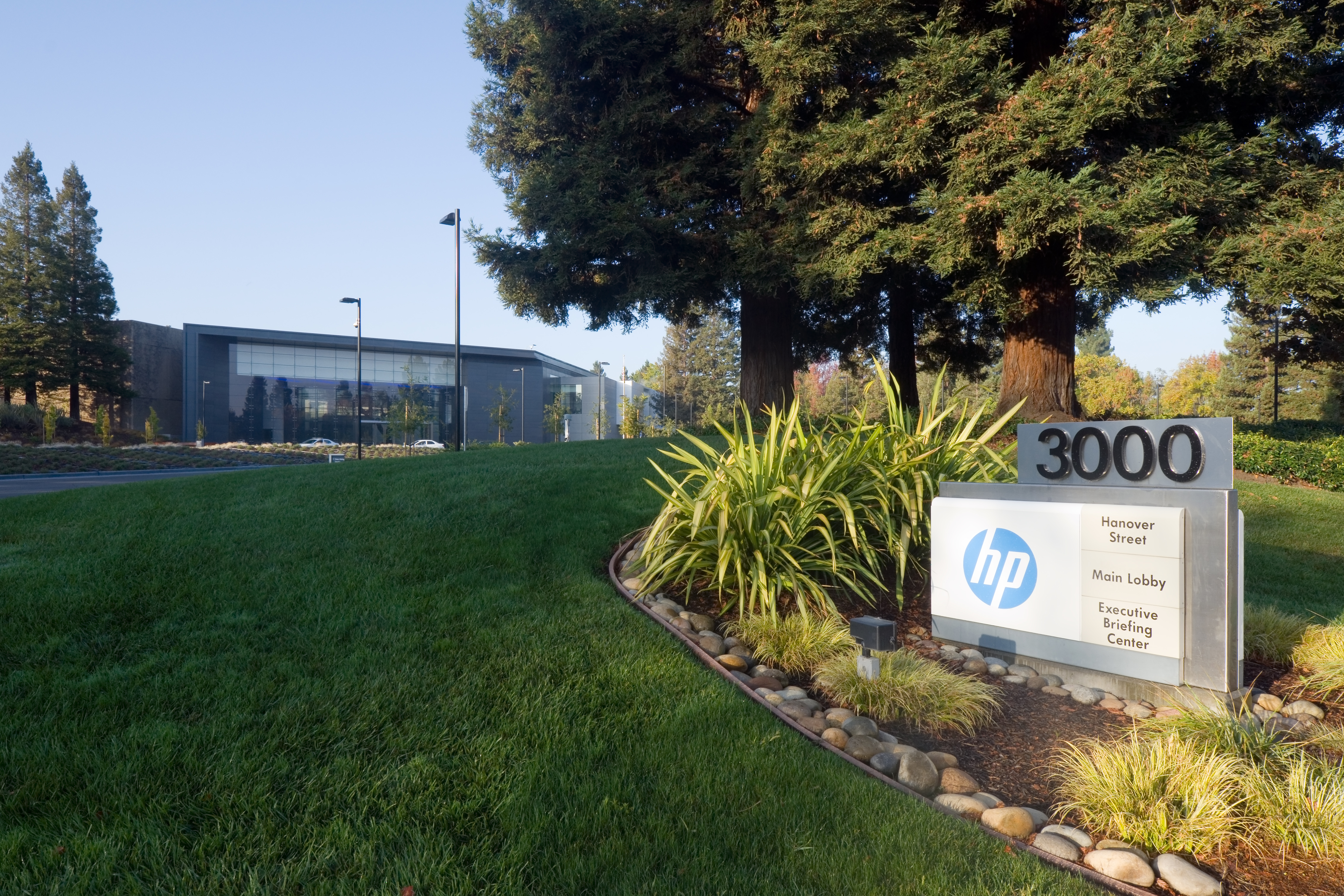
- Headquarters in Palo Alto, California
- Type: Public
- Traded as: NYSE: HWP (1961–2002) NYSE: HPQ (2002–2015); S&P 100 component (until 2015); S&P 500 component (1962–2015); DJIA component (1997–2013)
- Industry: Computer hardware; Computer software; IT services; IT consulting
- Founded: July 2, 1939; 87 years ago
- Founders: Bill Hewlett; David Packard
- Defunct: November 1, 2015; 11 years ago
- Fate: Split into HP Inc. and Hewlett Packard Enterprise
- Successors: HP Inc. (legal successor); Hewlett Packard Enterprise; DXC Technology; Micro Focus; Agilent Technologies
- Headquarters: Palo Alto, California; 37.4136°N 122.1451°W, U.S.
- Area served: Worldwide
- Products: List of Hewlett-Packard products
- Revenue: 53,559,000,000 United States dollar (2024)
- Operating income: 3,818,000,000 United States dollar (2024)
- Net income: 2,775,000,000 United States dollar (2024)
- Number of employees: 302,000 (2014)
- Subsidiaries: List of subsidiaries
- Website: hp.com

The Hewlett-Packard Company, commonly shortened to Hewlett-Packard (/ˈhjuːlɪt ˈpækərd/ HEW-lit PAK-ərd) or HP, was an American multinational information technology company. It was founded by Bill Hewlett and David Packard in 1939 in a one-car garage in Palo Alto, California. Growing to become an influential high-tech powerhouse at the heart of Silicon Valley, the company was known for its progressive business philosophy, deemed the HP Way. HP developed and provided a wide variety of hardware components, as well as software and related services, to consumers, small and medium-sized businesses (SMBs), and fairly large companies, including customers in government sectors. At its peak in 2011, HP employed 350,000 people around the globe. The company officially split into Hewlett Packard Enterprise and HP Inc. in 2015.

HP initially produced a line of electronic test and measurement equipment. It won its first big contract in 1938 to provide the HP 200B, a variation of its first product, the HP 200A low-distortion frequency oscillator, for Walt Disney's production of the 1940 animated film Fantasia, which allowed Hewlett and Packard to formally establish the Hewlett-Packard Company on July 2, 1939. The company grew into a multinational corporation widely respected for its products. HP was the world's leading PC manufacturer from 2007 until the second quarter of 2013 when Lenovo moved ahead of HP. HP specialized in developing and manufacturing computing, data storage, and networking hardware, designing software, and delivering services. Major product lines included personal computing devices, enterprise and industry standard servers, related storage devices, networking products, software, and a range of printers and other imaging products. The company directly marketed its products to households, small- to medium-sized businesses, and enterprises, as well as via online distribution, consumer-electronics, and office-supply retailers, software partners, and major technology vendors. It also offered services and a consulting business for its products and partner products.

In 1999, HP spun off its electronic and bio-analytical test and measurement instruments business into Agilent Technologies; HP retained focus on its later products, including computers and printers. It merged with Compaq in 2002 in what was then a major deal within the industry. They made numerous other acquisitions including Electronic Data Systems in 2008, which led to combined revenues of $118.4 billion that year and a Fortune 500 ranking of 9 in 2009, and later 3Com, Palm, Inc., and 3PAR, all in 2010, followed by Autonomy Corp. However, as a result of the turmoil created by several of these acquisitions, the company's fortunes swiftly declined in the 2010s. This led to Hewlett-Packard Company's split into two separate companies on November 1, 2015: its enterprise products and services business were spun-off to form Hewlett Packard Enterprise, while its personal computer and printer businesses became HP Inc. The split was structured so that the former Hewlett-Packard Company would change its name to HP Inc. and spin off Hewlett Packard Enterprise as a newly created company. HP Inc. retained the old Hewlett-Packard's stock-price history and original NYSE ticker symbol; Hewlett Packard Enterprise trades under its own ticker symbol: HPE.

== History ==
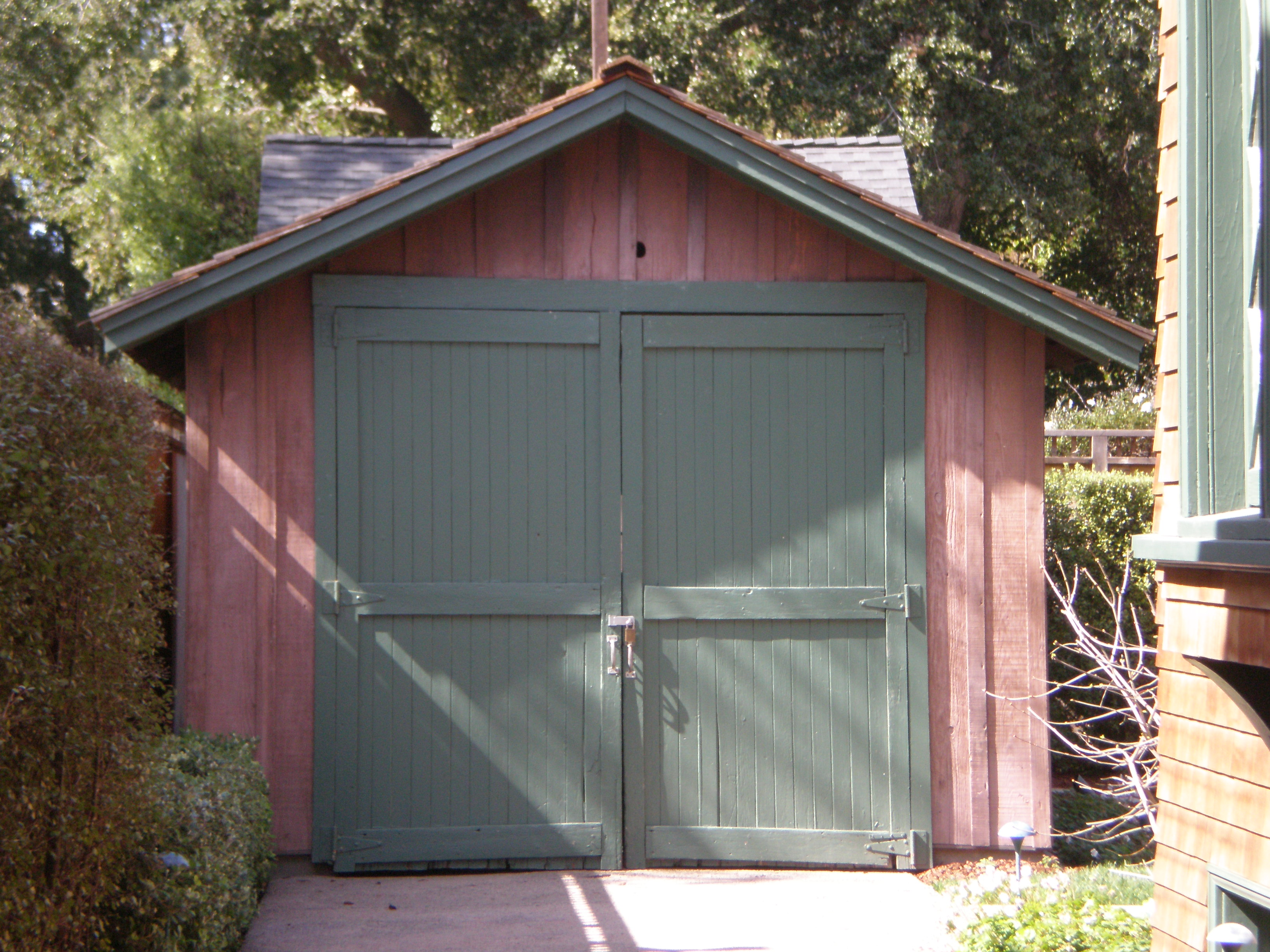
The garage in Palo Alto, where Hewlett and Packard began the company

Logo used from 1954 to 1964

Bill Hewlett and David Packard graduated with degrees in electrical engineering from Stanford University in 1935. The company started in a garage in Palo Alto during a fellowship they had with past professor Frederick Terman at Stanford during the Great Depression, whom they considered a mentor. In 1938, Packard and Hewlett began part-time work in a rented garage with an initial capital investment of US$538 (equivalent to $12,305 in 2025). In 1939, Hewlett and Packard decided to formalize their partnership. They tossed a coin to decide whether the company they founded would be called Hewlett-Packard (HP) or Packard-Hewlett.

Hewlett and Packard's first financially successful product was a precision audio oscillator known as the HP 200A, which used a small incandescent light bulb as a temperature dependent resistor in a critical portion of the circuit, and a negative feedback loop to stabilize the amplitude of the output sinusoidal waveform. This allowed the HP 200A to be sold for $89.40 when competitors were selling less stable oscillators for over $200. The 200 series of generators continued production until at least 1972 as the 200AB, still tube-based but improved in design through the years.

One of the company's earliest customers was Bud Hawkins, chief sound engineer for Walt Disney Studios, who bought eight HP 200B audio oscillators (at $71.50 each) to be used in the animated film Fantasia. HP's profit at the end of 1939, its first full year of business, was $1,563 (equivalent to $36,177 in 2025) on revenues of $5,369.

In 1942, they built their first building at 395 Page Mill Road and were awarded the Army-Navy "E" Award in 1943. HP employed 200 people and produced the audio oscillator, a wave analyzer, distortion analyzers, an audio-signal generator, and the Model 400A vacuum-tube voltmeter during the war.

Hewlett and Packard worked on counter-radar technology and artillery shell proximity fuzes during World War II; the work exempted Packard from the draft, but Hewlett had to serve as an officer in the Army Signal Corps after being called to active duty.

HP was incorporated on August 18, 1947, with Packard as president. Sales reached $5.5 million in 1951 with 215 employees. The company went public on November 6, 1957. In 1959, a manufacturing plant was established in Böblingen and a marketing organization in Geneva. Packard handed the presidency over to Hewlett when he became chairman in 1964, but remained CEO of the company.

=== 1960s ===
Logo used from 1964 to 1979

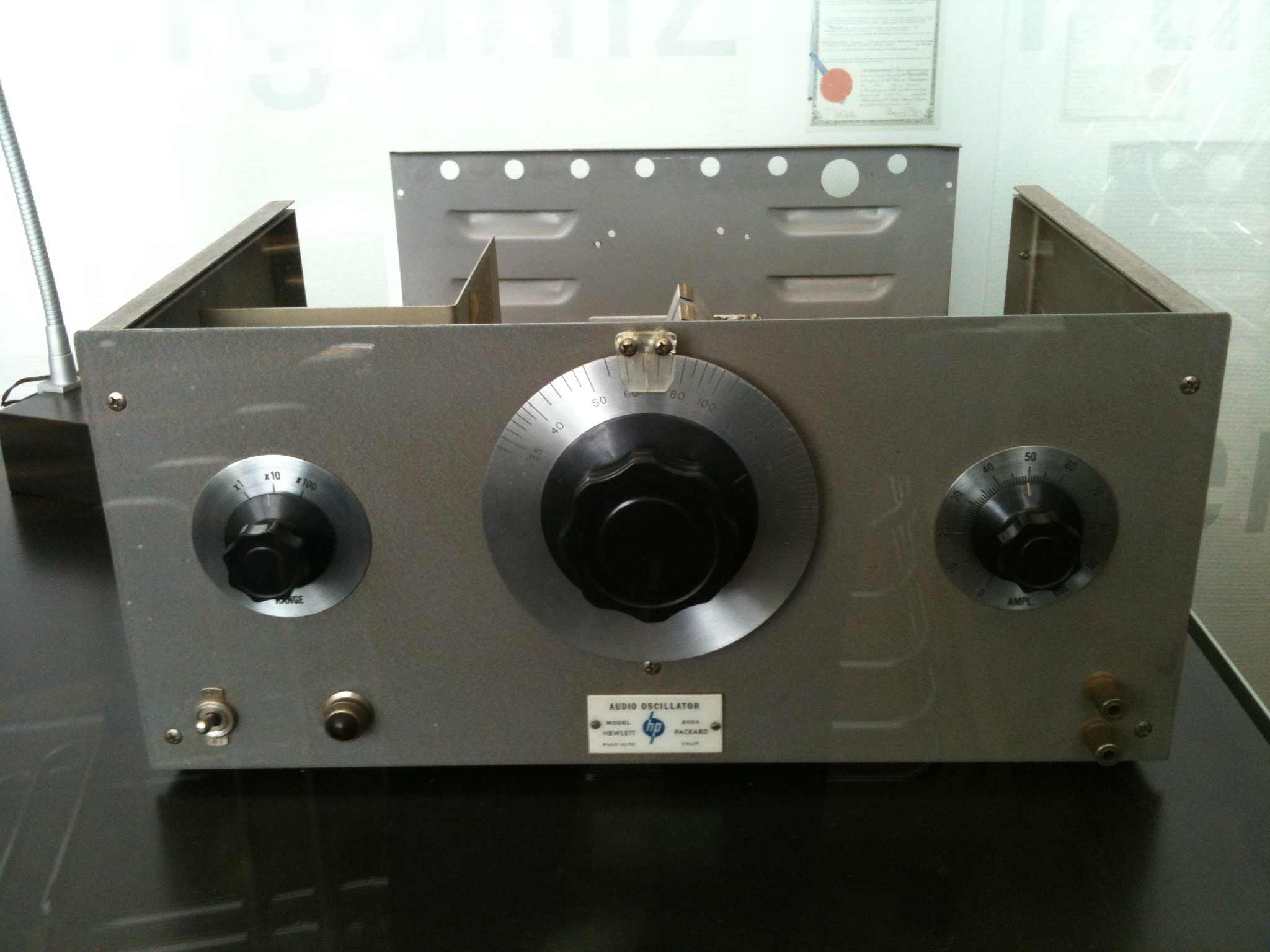
The HP200A, a precision audio oscillator, was the company's first financially successful product.

HP is recognized as the symbolic founder of Silicon Valley, though it did not actively investigate semiconductor devices until a few years after the "traitorous eight" abandoned William Shockley to create Fairchild Semiconductor in 1957. The company's HP Associates division was established around 1960 under the leadership of Jack Melchor to develop semiconductor devices primarily for internal use. Instruments and calculators were some of the original HP products that used semiconductor devices.

During the 1960s, HP partnered with Sony and Yokogawa Electric in Japan to develop several high-quality products. The products were not a huge success, as there were high costs involved in building HP-looking products in Japan. In 1963, HP and Yokogawa formed the joint venture Yokogawa-Hewlett-Packard to market HP products in Japan. HP bought Yokogawa Electric's share of Hewlett-Packard Japan in 1999.

HP spun off the small company Dynac to specialize in digital equipment. The name was picked so that the HP logo could be turned upside down to be a reflected image of the logo of the new company (DY). Dynac was eventually renamed Dymec and folded back into HP in 1959. HP experimented with using Digital Equipment Corporation (DEC) minicomputers with its instruments, but entered the computer market in 1966 with the HP 2100 / HP 1000 series of minicomputers after it decided that it would be easier to build another small design team than deal with DEC. The minicomputers had a simple accumulator-based design with two accumulator registers and, in the HP 1000 models, two index registers. The series was produced for 20 years in spite of several attempts to replace it, and was a forerunner of the HP 9800 and HP 250 series of desktop and business computers.

Beginning in 1961, Hewlett-Packard was listed on the New York Stock Exchange (as well as the now-closed Pacific Exchange) under its own ticker symbol, "HWP". At the end of 1968, Packard handed over the duties of CEO to Hewlett to become United States Deputy Secretary of Defense in the incoming Nixon administration. He resumed the chairmanship in 1972 and served until 1993, but Hewlett remained the CEO.

=== 1970s ===
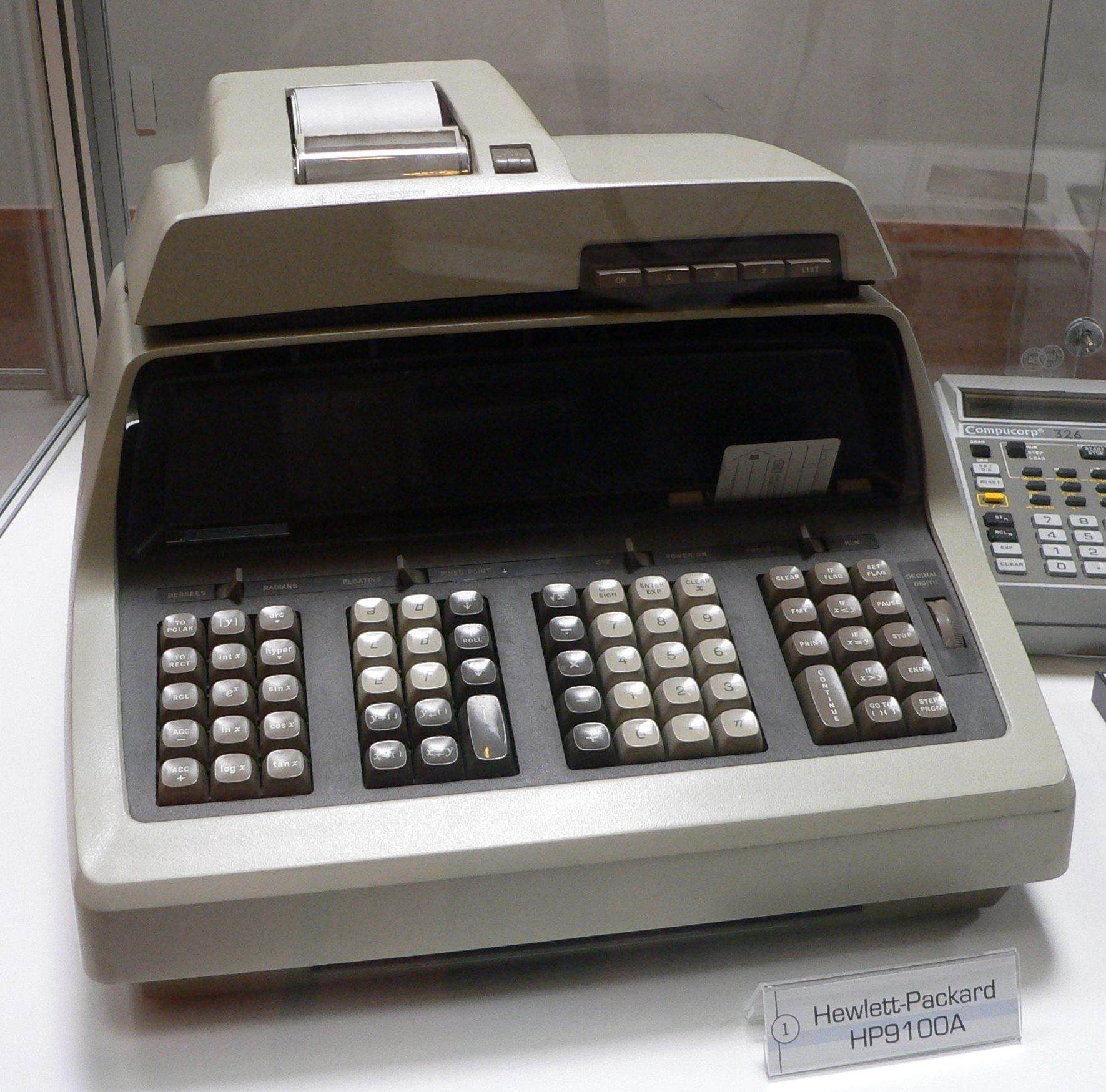
Introduced in 1968, "The new Hewlett-Packard 9100A personal computer is ready, willing, and able ... to relieve you of waiting to get on the big computer."

The HP 3000 was an advanced stack-based design for a business computing server, later redesigned with RISC technology. The HP 2640 series of smart and intelligent terminals introduced forms-based interfaces to ASCII terminals, and also introduced screen labeled function keys. The HP 2640 series included one of the first bit mapped graphics displays that, when combined with the HP 2100 21MX F-Series microcoded Scientific Instruction Set, enabled the first commercial WYSIWYG presentation program, BRUNO, that later became the program HP-Draw on the HP 3000. Although scoffed at in the formative days of computing, HP surpassed IBM as the world's largest technology vendor in terms of sales.

HP was identified by Wired magazine as the producer of the world's first device to be called a personal computer: the Hewlett-Packard 9100A, introduced in 1968. HP called it a desktop calculator because, as Hewlett said: "If we had called it a computer, it would have been rejected by our customers' computer gurus because it didn't look like an IBM. We therefore decided to call it a calculator, and all such nonsense disappeared." An engineering triumph at the time, the logic circuit was produced without any integrated circuits, and the CPU assembly was entirely executed in discrete components. With CRT display, magnetic-card storage, and printer, the price was around $5,000. The machine's keyboard was a cross between the keyboard of a scientific calculator and the keyboard of an adding machine. There was no alphabetic keyboard.

Apple co-founder Steve Wozniak originally designed the Apple I computer while working at HP and offered it to HP under its right of first refusal to his work. It did not take it up as the company wanted to stay in scientific, business, and industrial markets. Wozniak said that HP "turned him down five times", but that his loyalty to HP made him hesitant to start Apple with Steve Jobs.

The company earned global respect for a variety of products. They introduced the world's first handheld scientific electronic calculator in 1972 (the HP-35), the first handheld programmable in 1974 (the HP-65), the first alphanumeric, programmable, expandable in 1979 (the HP-41C), and the first symbolic and graphing calculator, the HP-28C.

Like its scientific and business calculators, HP oscilloscopes, logic analyzers, and other measurement instruments had a reputation for sturdiness and usability. HP introduced the Hewlett-Packard Interface Bus (HPIB) computer peripheral interface (later cloned by National Instruments as GPIB and standardized by the IEEE as IEEE-488) on its relay actuator products in 1973. HPIB was later integrated into most high end test & measurement equipment it produced from 1980 onward.

As early as 1977, HP began production of the HP856x spectrum analyzers to complement its RF power meters and sensors capable of measuring signals in excess of 20 GHz. HP also produced configurable chassis based sweep generators capable of generating signals to 20 GHz. Other T&M products of the time included lab grade multimeters, microwave frequency counters, RF amplifiers, high accuracy microwave detectors, lab grade power supplies and more. These products were succeeded by modernized versions as well as the introduction of the scalar and vector network analyzer product lines prior to the business being spun off into Agilent Technologies.

The HP 9800 series of technical desktop computers started in 1971 with the 9810A. The HP Series 80 started in 1979 with the 85. Some of these machines used a version of the BASIC programming language, which was available immediately after they were switched on, and used a proprietary magnetic tape for storage. HP computers were similar in capabilities to the much later IBM Personal Computer, though the limitations of available technology forced prices to be high.

In 1978, Hewlett stepped down as CEO and was succeeded by John A. Young.

=== 1980s ===
HP expanded into South Africa in the 1980s. Activists supporting divestment from South Africa accused HP of "automating apartheid".

Sales reached $6.5 billion in 1985 with 85,000 employees.

In 1984, HP introduced both inkjet and laser printers for the desktop. Along with its scanner product line, the printers have later been developed into successful multifunction products, the most significant being single-unit printer/scanner/copier/fax machines. The print mechanisms in HP's LaserJet line of laser printers depend almost entirely on Canon Inc.'s components (print engines), which in turn use technology developed by Xerox. HP developed the hardware, firmware, and software to convert data into dots for printing.

On March 3, 1986, HP registered the HP.com domain name, making it the ninth internet .com domain to be registered.

In 1987, the Palo Alto garage where Hewlett and Packard started their business was designated as a California Historical Landmark.

=== 1990s ===
Logo used from November 1999 to November 1, 2010

In the 1990s, HP expanded its computer product line, which initially had been targeted at university, research, and business users, to reach consumers. HP entered into the home and home office market for the first time with the introduction of the HP Pavilion brand of personal computers in 1995, which initially featured desktop models but later expanded to include laptop and notebook models under the Pavilion name in 1999. HP also grew through acquisitions: it bought Apollo Computer in 1989 and Convex Computer in 1995.

In 1992, Young was succeeded by Lewis E. Platt, and in 1993 Packard stepped down from the board, with Platt succeeding Packard as chairman.

In 1993, HP acquired Advanced Design System from Pathwave. The ADS suite of RF simulation tools was spun off into Agilent in 1999 along with related T&M business units, all of which were carried forward into the spinoff of Agilent into Keysight.

Later in the decade, HP opened hpshopping.com as an independent subsidiary to sell online, direct to consumers; in 2005, the store was renamed "HP Home & Home Office Store".

From 1995 to 1999, Hewlett-Packard were sponsors of the English football team Tottenham Hotspur.

In 1999, all of the businesses not related to computers, storage, and imaging were spun off from HP to form Agilent Technologies. Agilent's spin-off was the largest initial public offering in the history of Silicon Valley, and it created an $8 billion company with about 30,000 employees, manufacturing scientific instruments, semiconductors, optical networking devices, and electronic test equipment for telecom and wireless, research and development, and production.

In July 1999, HP appointed Carly Fiorina as the first female CEO of a Fortune-20 company in the Dow Jones Industrial Average. Fiorina received a larger signing offer than any of her predecessors. The same year, Fiorina articulated a set of "rules of the garage" in an attempt to reinterpret the spirit of the company's founders.

==== Sales to Iran despite sanctions ====
In 1997, HP started selling its products in Iran through a European subsidiary and a Dubai-based Middle Eastern distributor, despite U.S. export sanctions prohibiting such deals imposed by Bill Clinton's 1995 executive orders. The story was initially reported by The Boston Globe, and it triggered an inquiry by the U.S. Securities and Exchange Commission (SEC). HP responded that products worth US$120 million were sold in fiscal year 2008 for distribution via Redington Gulf, a company based in the Netherlands, and that as these sales took place through a foreign subsidiary, HP had not violated sanctions.

HP named Redington Gulf "Wholesaler of the Year" in 2003, which in turn published a press release stating that "the seeds of the Redington-Hewlett-Packard relationship were sowed six years ago for one market — Iran." At the time, Redington Gulf had only three employees whose sole purpose was to sell HP products to the Iran market. According to former officials who worked on sanctions, HP used a loophole by routing their sales through a foreign subsidiary. HP ended its relationship with Redington Gulf after the SEC inquiry.

=== 2000–2005 ===
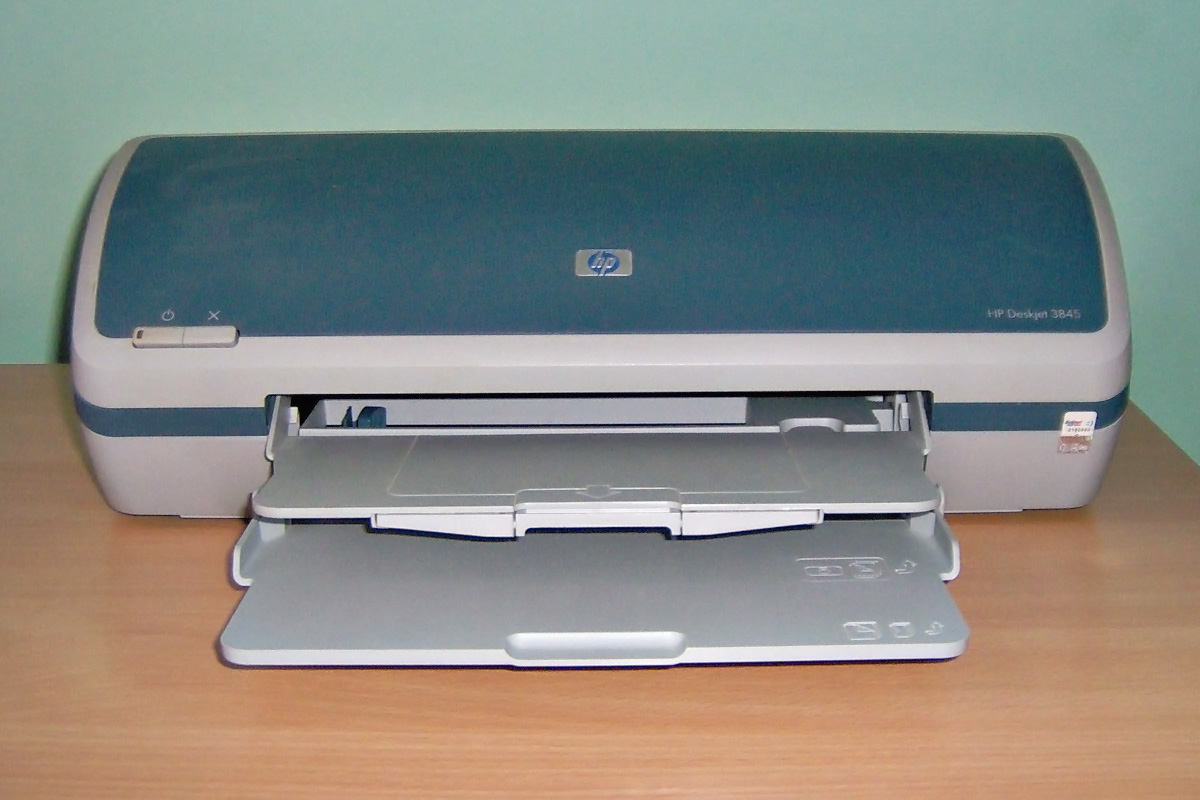
A Hewlett-Packard Deskjet 3845 printer

On September 3, 2001, HP announced that an agreement had been reached with Compaq to merge the two companies. On May 3, 2002, after passing a shareholder vote, HP officially announced the merger with Compaq; the newly-merged company would officially launch a few days later on May 7, 2002. Prior to this, plans had been put in place to consolidate the companies' product teams and product lines.

As Compaq acquired Tandem Computers in 1997 and Digital Equipment Corporation (DEC) in 1998, HP gained control of both acquired companies' product lines, and offered support for the Tandem NonStop family (now owned by Hewlett Packard Enterprise) and DEC products PDP-11, VAX and Alpha for quite some time until the later years where support was gradually dwindled. Both the DEC PDP-11 and VAX were discontinued years prior to the merger, and HP supported Alpha until April 2007.

The merger was preceded by a proxy fight in 2001 with numerous large HP shareholders, in particular Bill Hewlett's son Walter and other descendants of the business founders, objecting to the merger, only approving it reluctantly. Prior to the merger, HP's ticker symbol was "HWP", which became "HPQ" shortly after acquiring Compaq, and was subsequently announced on May 6, 2002. The new ticker symbol is a combination of the two previous symbols, "HWP" and "CPQ" respectively, showing the significance of the alliance. HP then became a major producer in desktop computers, laptops, and servers for many different markets in the coming years.

In 2002, Mscape was established as a mobile media gaming platform that could be used to create location-based games.

HP would release new models of laptops under the Pavilion name during the early-to-mid 2000s, including the dv1000 series (which includes the dv1040 and the later dv1658 models) in August 2004 and the dv4000 and dv8000 series in 2005.

In January 2005, following years of underperformance, which included HP's Compaq merger that fell short and disappointing earning reports, the board asked Fiorina to resign as chair and chief executive officer of the company, which she did on February 9, 2005. After her departure, HP's stock jumped 6.9 percent. Robert Wayman, chief financial officer of HP, served as interim CEO while the board undertook a formal search for a replacement.

Mark Hurd of NCR Corporation was hired to take over as CEO and president, effective April 1, 2005. Hurd was the board's top choice given the revival of NCR that took place under his leadership.

=== 2006–2009 ===
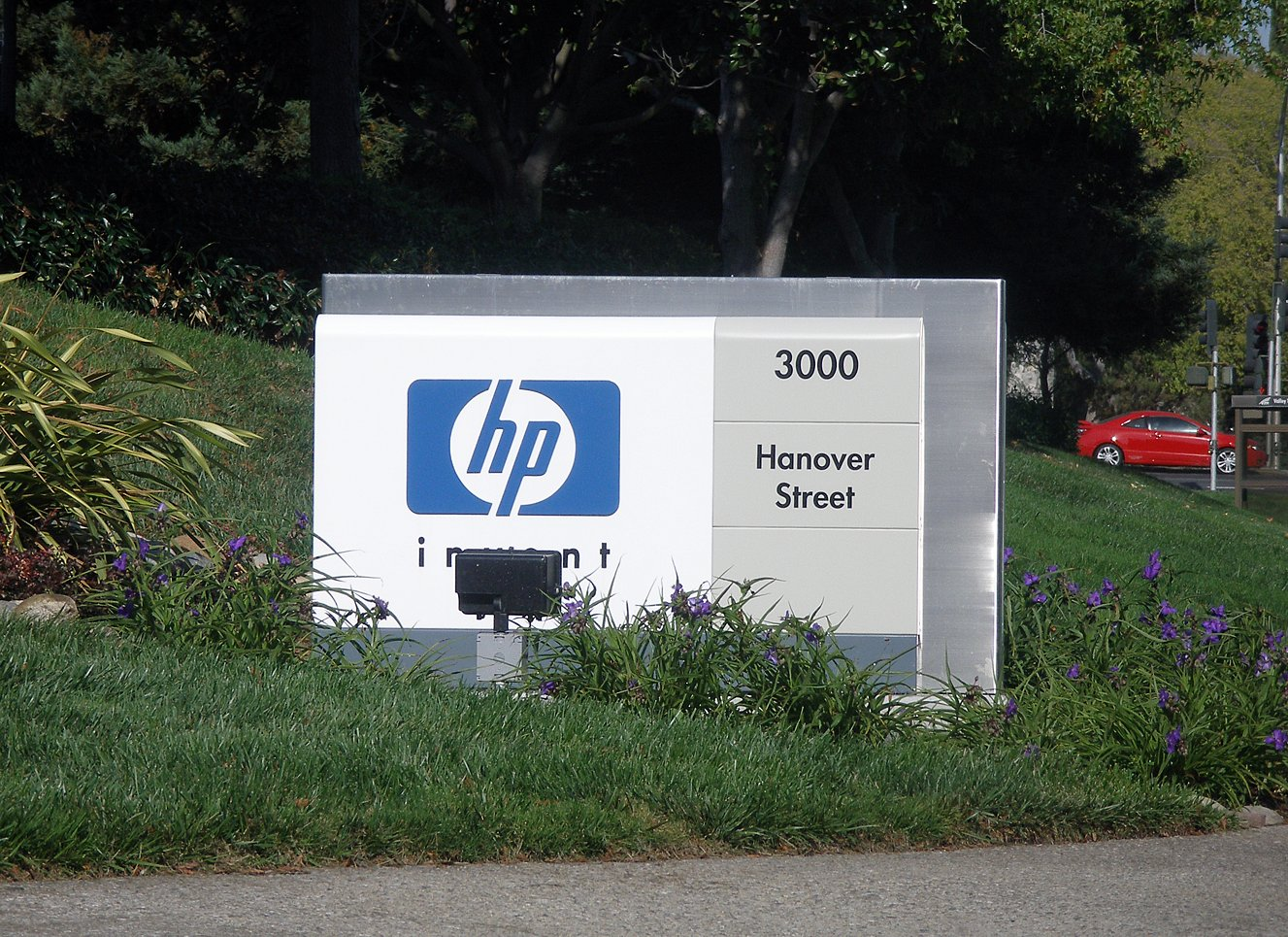
A sign marking the entrance to the HP corporate headquarters in Palo Alto, California, 2006

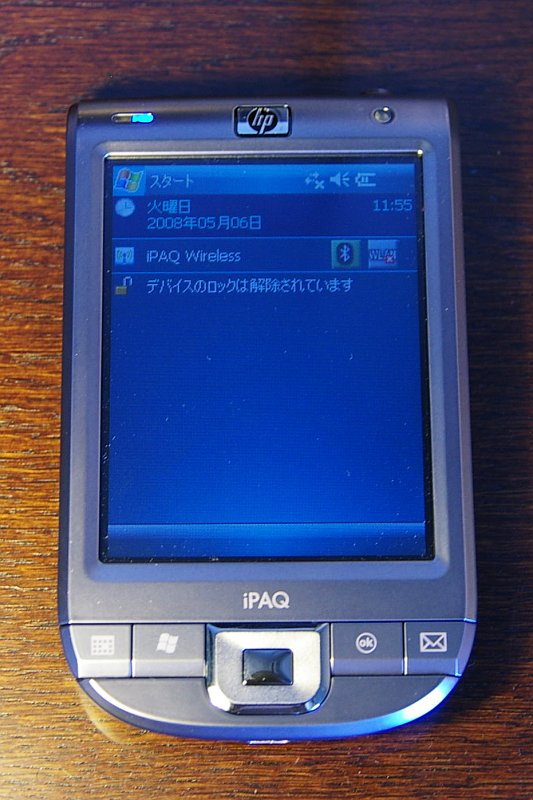
iPAQ 112 Pocket PC from 2008

Logo used from November 15, 2007 to June 4, 2012

Logo used from June 2008 to 2014

In 2006, HP unveiled several new products including desktops, enhanced notebooks, a workstation, and software to manage them—OpenView Client Configuration Manager 2.0. That same year, HP's share price skyrocketed due to consistent results in the last couple quarters of the year with Hurd's plan to cut back HP's workforce and lower costs. HP was delisted from the Pacific Exchange (now closed with trades going through the NYSE Arca platform) on May 1, 2006, but continues to trade on the New York Stock Exchange as well as Nasdaq.

HP introduced a global marketing campaign for its line of personal computers in May 2006 under the tagline "The Computer is Personal Again", coinciding with the launch of its new line of consumer and business products that same month. The campaign aimed at bringing back the computer as a powerful personal tool, utilizing viral marketing and sophisticated visuals, and had its own website. The ads featured Pharrell, Petra Nemcova, Mark Burnett, Mark Cuban, Alicia Keys, Jay-Z, Gwen Stefani, and Shaun White. This campaign applied to HP's product offerings which included desktops, laptops, and other hardware and software.

HP introduced new laptop models for the HP Pavilion lineup in 2006, starting with the dv5000 series in January, the dv2000 series in May and later the dv6000 and dv9000 series in July.

In July 2007, HP signed a definitive agreement to acquire Opsware in a cash tender deal that values the company at $14.25 per share, which combined Opsware software with the Oracle enterprise IT management software.

In the first few years of Hurd's tenure as CEO, HP's stock price more than doubled. By the end of the 2007 fiscal year, HP reached the $100 billion mark for the first time. The company's annual revenue reached $104 billion, allowing HP to overtake competitor IBM.

On May 13, 2008, HP and Electronic Data Systems (EDS) announced that they had signed a definitive agreement under which HP would purchase EDS. On June 30, HP announced that the waiting period under the Hart-Scott-Rodino Antitrust Improvements Act of 1976 had expired. "The transaction still requires EDS stockholder approval and regulatory clearance from the European Commission and other non-U.S. jurisdictions and is subject to the satisfaction or waiver of the other closing conditions specified in the merger agreement." The agreement was finalized on August 26, 2008, at $13 billion, and it was publicly announced that EDS would be re-branded. The first targeted layoff of 24,600 former EDS workers was announced on September 15, 2008. (The company's 2008 annual report gave the number as 24,700, to be completed by end of 2009.) This round was factored into the purchase price as a $19.5 billion liability against goodwill. As of September 23, 2009, EDS was known as HP Enterprise Services (now known as DXC Technology).

On November 11, 2009, 3Com and Hewlett-Packard announced that the latter would be acquiring 3Com for $2.7 billion in cash. The acquisition was one of the biggest in size among a series of takeovers and acquisitions by technology giants to push their way to become one-stop shops. Since the beginning of the financial crisis in 2007, tech giants have constantly felt the pressure to expand beyond their current market niches. Dell purchased Perot Systems to move into the technology consulting business area previously dominated by IBM. Hewlett-Packard's latest move marked its diversification into enterprise networking gear market dominated by Cisco.

=== 2010–2012 ===
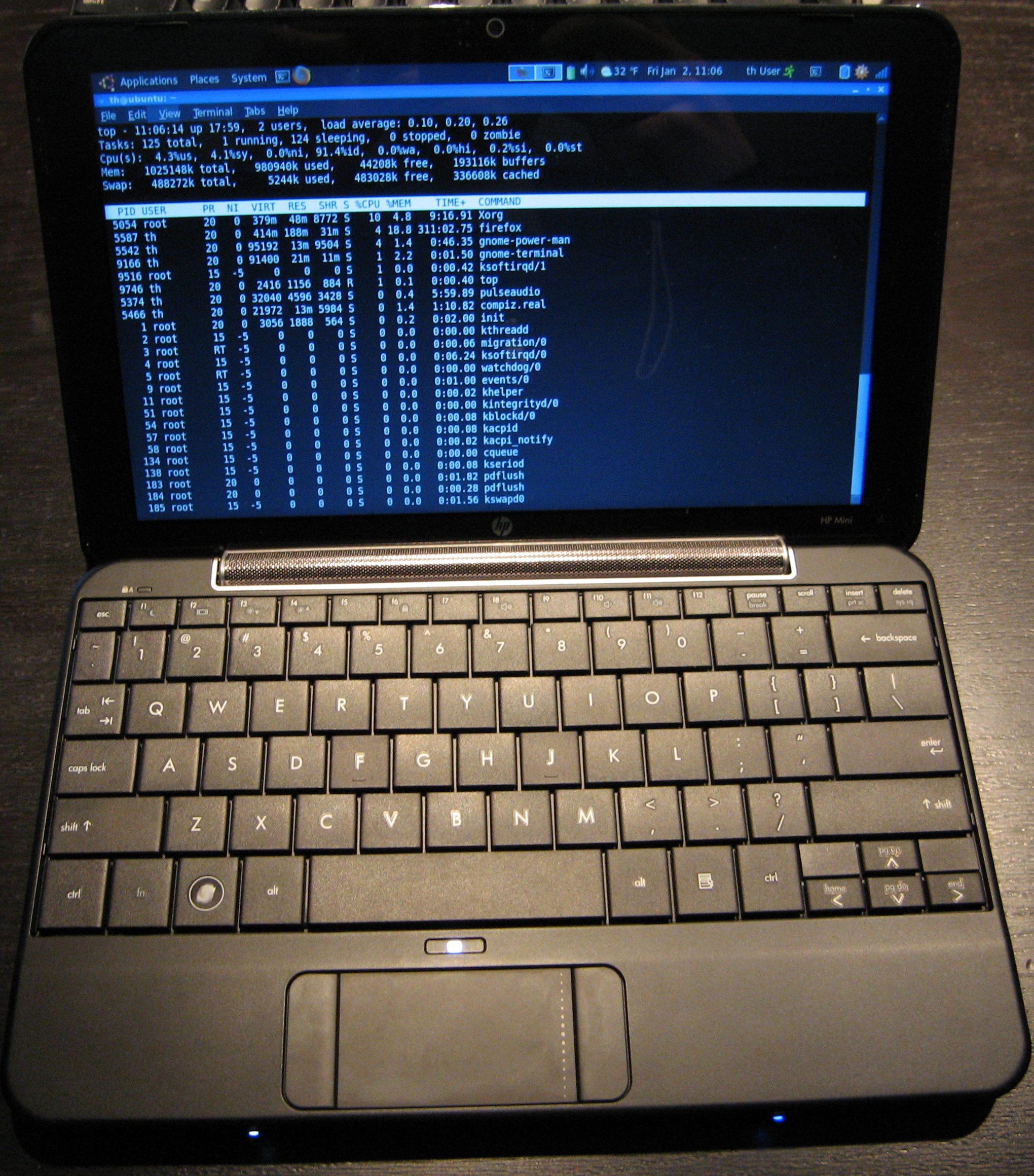
A Hewlett-Packard Mini 1000 netbook computer, a type of notebook computer

Logo used from November 1, 2010 to 2014

Final logo, used from 2012 to 2015 (and used by HP Inc. from 2015 to 2025)

On April 28, 2010, HP announced that it would buy Palm, Inc. for $1.2 billion in cash and debt. The acquisition of Palm, Inc. was finalized on July 1, 2010. Adding Palm handsets to the HP product line created some overlap with the iPAQ series of mobile devices, but was thought to significantly improve HP's mobile presence as iPAQ devices had not been selling well. Buying Palm, Inc. gave HP a library of valuable patents and the mobile operating platform, webOS. Purchasing its webOS was a big gamble to build HP's own ecosystem. On July 1, 2011, HP launched its first tablet, HP TouchPad, which brought webOS to tablet devices. On September 2, 2010, HP won the bidding war for 3PAR with a $33 a share offer ($2.07 billion) that Dell declined to match. After HP acquired Palm Inc., it phased out the Compaq brand.

On August 6, 2010, Hurd resigned amid controversy and CFO Cathie Lesjak assumed the role of interim CEO. Hurd had turned HP around and was widely regarded as one of Silicon Valley's star CEOs, and under his leadership, HP became the largest computer company in the world when measured by total revenue. He was accused of sexual harassment against a colleague, though the allegations were deemed baseless. The investigation led to questions concerning some of his expenses and the lack of disclosure related to the friendship. Some observers have argued that Hurd was innocent, but the board asked for his resignation to avoid negative public relations.

Public analysis was divided between those who saw it as a commendable tough action by HP and those who saw it as an ill-advised, hasty, and expensive reaction, that ousted a capable leader who had turned the business around. At HP, Hurd oversaw a series of acquisitions worth over $20 billion, which allowed the company to expand into services of networking equipment and smartphones. HP shares dropped 8.4% in after-hours trading, hitting a 52-week low with a $9 billion reduction in market capitalization. Larry Ellison publicly attacked HP's board for Hurd's ousting, stating that the HP board had "made the worst personnel decision since the idiots on the Apple board fired Steve Jobs many years ago".

On September 30, 2010, Léo Apotheker was named HP's new CEO and president. His appointment sparked a strong reaction from Ellison, who complained that Apotheker had been in charge of SAP when one of its subsidiaries was systematically stealing software from Oracle. SAP accepted that its subsidiary, which has now closed, illegally accessed Oracle intellectual property. Following Hurd's departure, HP was seen to be problematic by the market, with margins falling and them failing to establish themselves in major new markets such as cloud and mobile services. Apotheker's strategy was to broadly aim at disposing hardware, whilst moving into the more profitable software services sector. On August 18, 2011, HP announced that it would strategically exit the smartphone and tablet computer business, and focus on higher-margin "strategic priorities of Cloud, solutions and software with an emphasis on enterprise, commercial and government markets". It also contemplated selling off its personal computer division or spinning it off into a separate company, and quitting PC development while continuing to sell servers and other equipment to business customers, which was a strategy undertaken by IBM in 2005.

On November 1, 2010, the classic 1979 Hewlett-Packard logo was discontinued and replaced with a new circle HP logo, with a larger and thinner wormark, for corporate branding. The 2008 circle variant was continued to be used as the secondary logo. This also made the 1999 symbol-only variant was also discontinued on the same day. The last product to use this logo was the HP ProLiant DL380 G7.

HP's stock dropped by about a further 40% after the company abruptly announced a number of decisions: to discontinue its webOS device business (mobile phones and tablet computers), the intent to sell its personal computer division (at the time HP was the largest personal computer manufacturer in the world), and to acquire British big data software firm Autonomy for a 79% premium, seen externally as an "absurdly high" price for a business with known concerns over its accounts. Media analysts described HP's actions as a "botched strategy shift" and a "chaotic" attempt to rapidly reposition HP and enhance earnings. HP's CFO objected to the Autonomy acquisition.

HP lost more than $30 billion in market capitalization during Apotheker's tenure, and on September 22, 2011, the HP Board of Directors fired him as chief executive and replaced him with fellow board member and former eBay chief Meg Whitman, with Raymond J. Lane as executive chairman. Although Apotheker served barely ten months, he received over $13 million in compensation. Weeks later, HP announced that a review had concluded its PC division was too integrated and critical to business operations, and the company reaffirmed its commitment to the Personal Systems Group.

On March 21, 2012, HP said its printing and PC divisions would become one unit headed by Todd Bradley from the PC division, and printing chief Vyomesh Joshi left the company.

On May 23, 2012, HP announced plans to lay off approximately 27,000 employees, after posting a profit decline of 31% in the second quarter of 2012. Profits declined because of the growing popularity of smart phones, tablets, and other mobile devices, which slowed down personal computer sales.

On May 30, 2012, HP unveiled its first net zero energy data center, which used solar energy and other renewable sources instead of traditional power grids.

On July 10, 2012, HP's Server Monitoring Software was discovered to have a previously unknown security vulnerability. A security warning was given to customers about two vulnerabilities, and a patch addressing the issues was released. One month later, HP's official training center was hacked and defaced by a Pakistani hacker known as Hitcher to demonstrate a Web vulnerability.

On September 10, 2012, HP revised its restructuring figures and started cutting 29,000 jobs.

In November 2012, HP wrote off almost $9 billion related to the Autonomy acquisition, which became the subject of intense litigation, as HP accused Autonomy's previous management of fraudulently exaggerating Autonomy's financial position and called in law enforcement and regulators in both countries. Autonomy's previous management accused HP of "textbook" obfuscation and finger pointing to protect HP's executives from criticism and conceal HP culpability, their prior knowledge of Autonomy's financial position, and gross mismanagement of Autonomy after acquisition.

=== 2013–2015 ===
On December 31, 2013, HP revised the number of jobs cut from 29,000 to 34,000 up to October 2014. The number of jobs cut until the end of 2013 was 24,600. At the end of 2013 the company had 317,500 employees. On May 22, 2014, HP announced it would cut a further 11,000 to 16,000 jobs, in addition to the 34,000 announced in 2013. Whitman said: "We are gradually shaping HP into a more nimble, lower-cost, more customer and partner-centric company that can successfully compete across a rapidly changing IT landscape."

During the June 2014 HP Discover customer event in Las Vegas, Whitman and Martin Fink announced a project for a radically new computer architecture called The Machine. Based on memristors and silicon photonics, it was supposed to come into commercialization before the end of the decade, and represented 75% of the research activity in HP Labs at the time.

On October 6, 2014, HP announced it was going to split into two separate companies to separate its personal computer and printer businesses from its technology services. The split, which was first reported by The Wall Street Journal and confirmed by other media, resulted in two publicly traded companies on November 1, 2015: Hewlett Packard Enterprise and HP Inc. The split was structured so that Hewlett-Packard changed its name to HP Inc. and spun off Hewlett Packard Enterprise as a new publicly traded company. Whitman became chairman of HP Inc. and CEO of Hewlett Packard Enterprise, Patricia Russo became chairman of the enterprise business, and Dion Weisler became CEO of HP, Inc.

On October 29, 2014, Hewlett-Packard announced its new Sprout personal computer.

In May 2015, the company announced it would be selling its controlling 51 percent stake in its Chinese data-networking business to Tsinghua Unigroup for a fee of at least $2.4 billion.

== Facilities ==
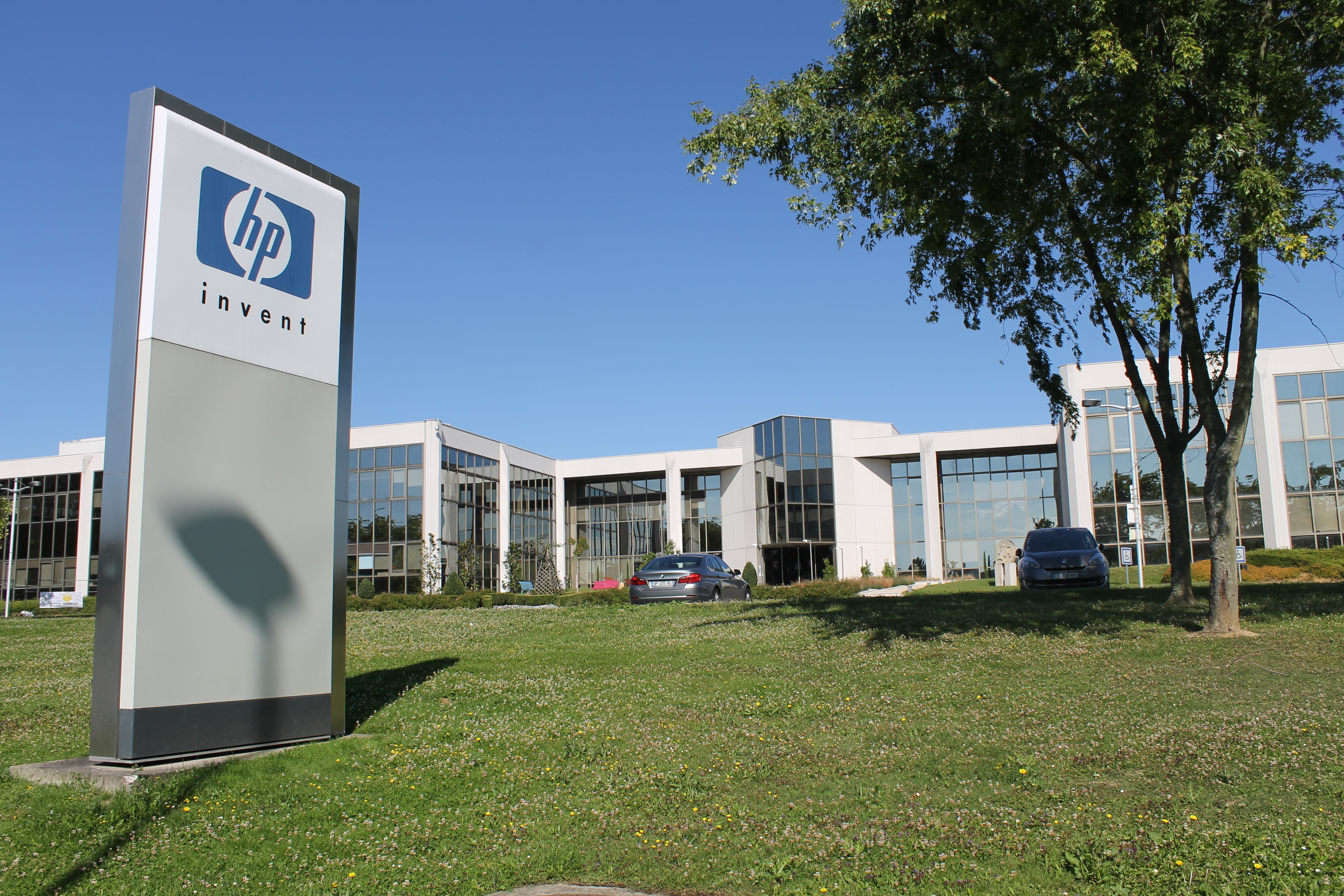
The research center of Hewlett-Packard in the Paris-Saclay cluster, France

HP's global operations were directed from its headquarters in Palo Alto, California. Its US operations were directed from its facility in an unincorporated area of Harris County, Texas, near Houston. Its Latin America offices were in unincorporated Miami-Dade County, Florida. Its European offices were in Meyrin, close to Geneva, Switzerland, but it also had a research center in the Paris-Saclay cluster 20 km south of Paris, France. Its Asia-Pacific offices were in Singapore.

HP had large operations in Leixlip, Ireland; Austin, Texas; Boise, Idaho; Corvallis, Oregon; Fort Collins, Colorado; Roseville, California; Saint Petersburg, Florida; San Diego, California; Tulsa, Oklahoma; Vancouver, Washington; Conway, Arkansas; and Plano, Texas. In the UK, HP was based at a large site in Bracknell, Berkshire, with offices in various UK locations, including a landmark office tower in London, 88 Wood Street.

Its acquisition of 3Com expanded its employee base to Marlborough, Massachusetts, where HP Inc. has been manufacturing its convertible laptop series since late 2019. HP had a large workforce and numerous offices in Bucharest, Romania, and at Bangalore, India, to address their back end and IT operations. Mphasis, which is headquartered at Bangalore, also enabled HP to increase their footprint in the city, as it was a subsidiary of EDS which the company acquired.

== Products and organizational structure ==
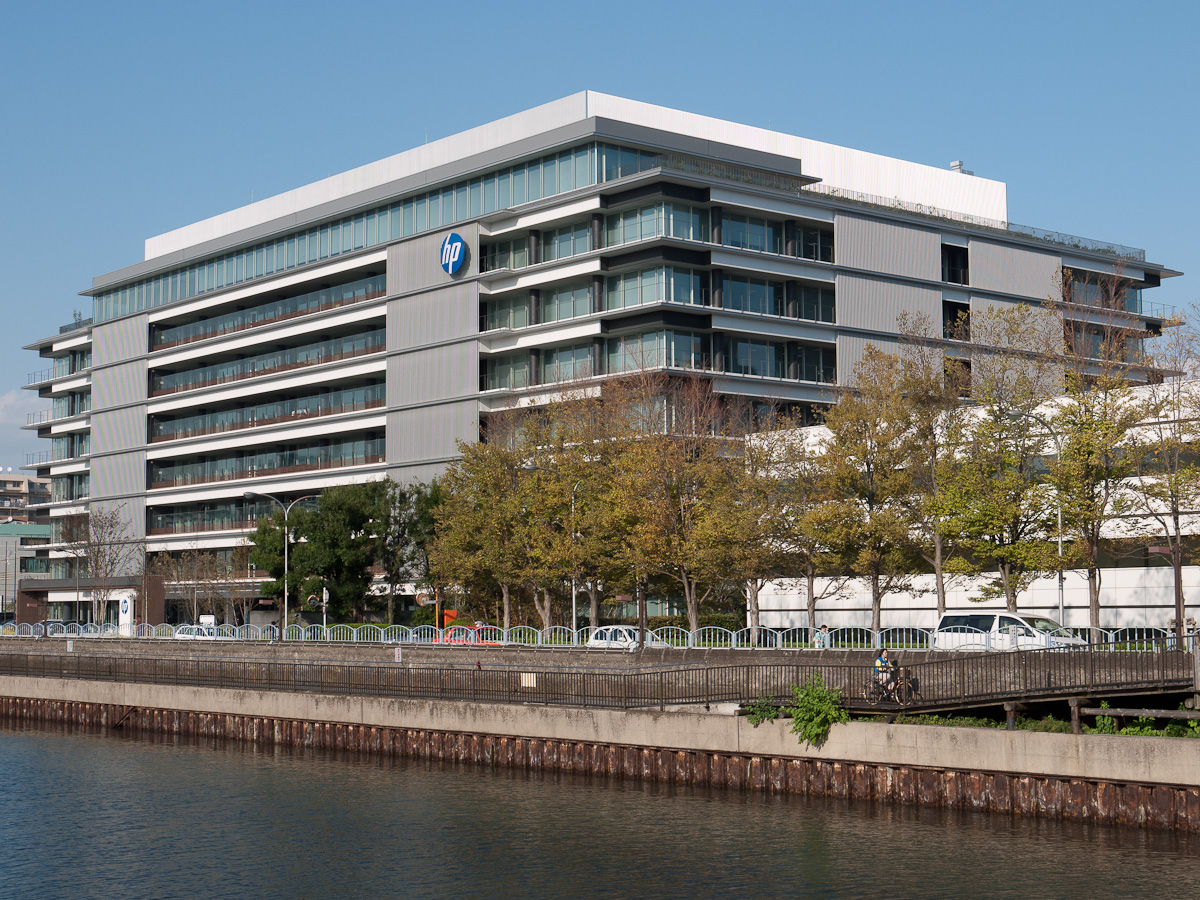
HP's head office in Japan, 2011

HP produced lines of printers, scanners, digital cameras, calculators, personal digital assistants, servers, workstation computers, and computers for home and small-business use; many of the computers came from the 2002 merger with Compaq. HP as of 2001 promoted itself as supplying not just hardware and software, but also a full range of services to design, implement, and support IT infrastructure.

HP's Imaging and Printing Group (IPG) was described by the company in 2005 as "the leading imaging and printing systems provider in the world for printer hardware, printing supplies and scanning devices, providing solutions across customer segments from individual consumers to small and medium businesses to large enterprises".

Products and technology associated with IPG included the Inkjet and LaserJet printers, the Officejet all-in-one multifunction printer/scanner/faxes, Indigo Digital Press, the HP Photosmart digital cameras and photo printers, and the photo sharing service Snapfish.

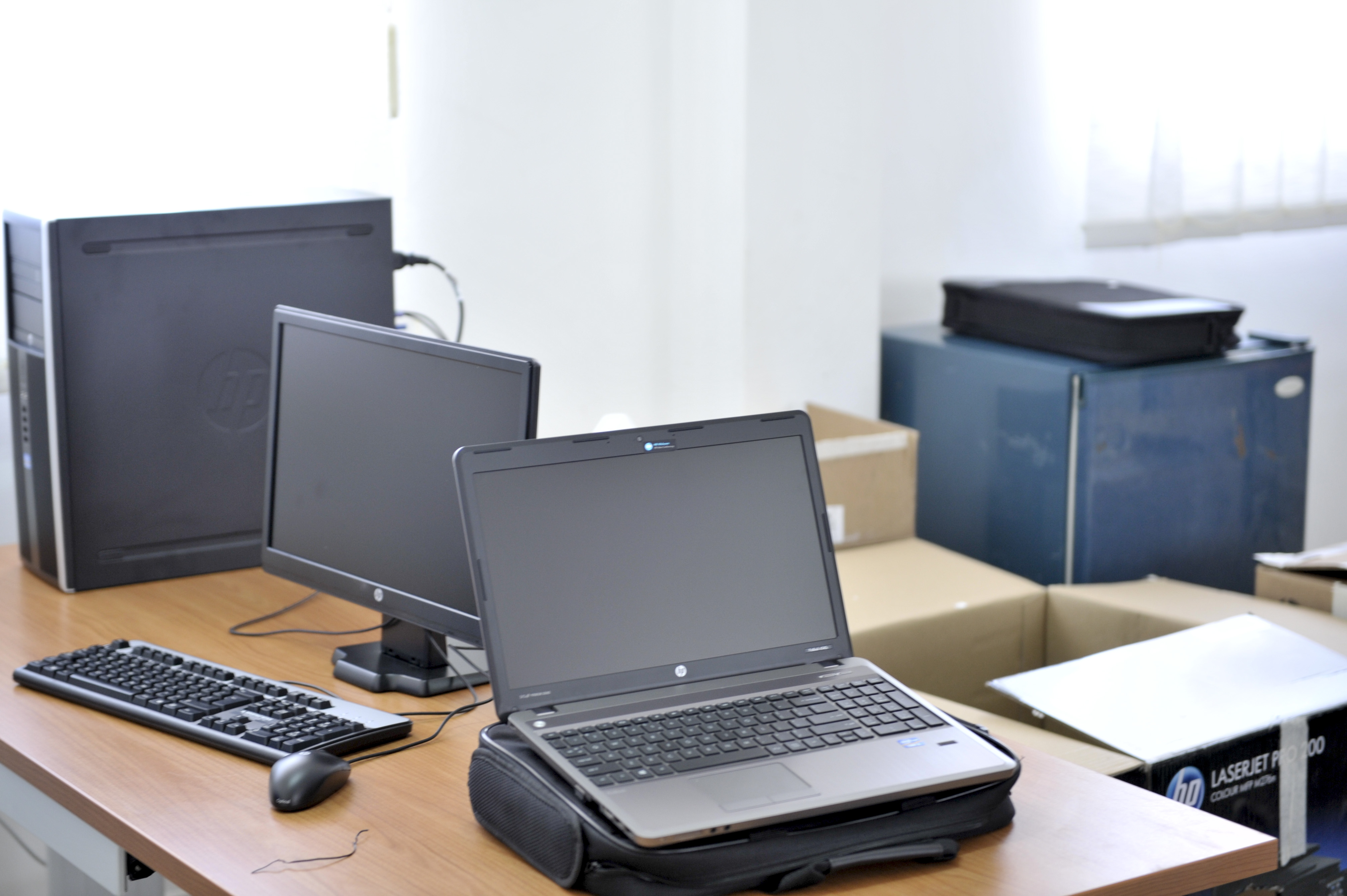
Hewlett-Packard 2014's desktop, monitor and laptop

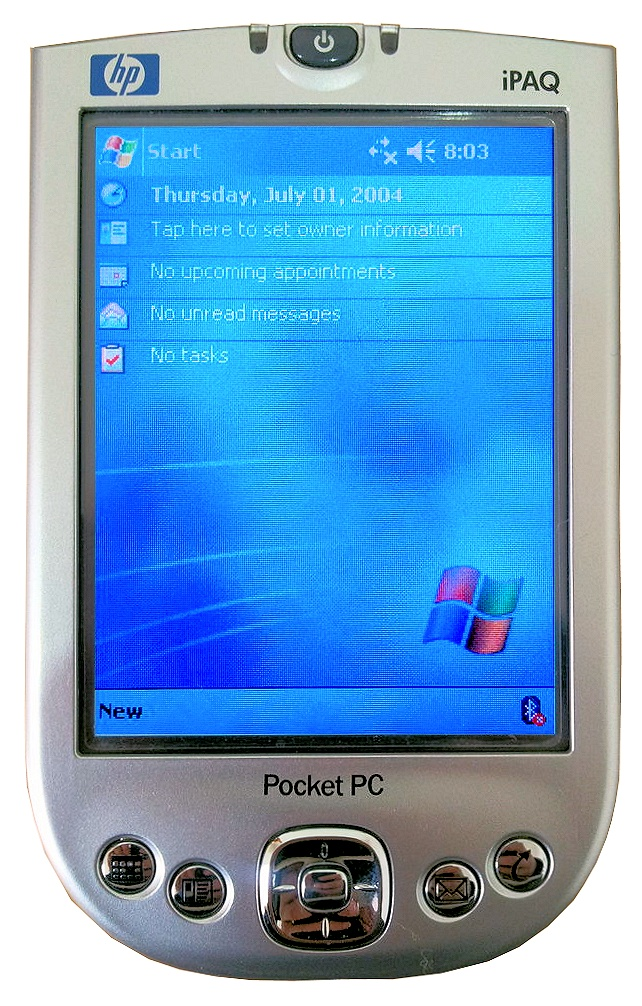
iPAQ h4150 Pocket PC from 2003

On December 23, 2008, HP released iPrint Photo for the iPhone.

HP's Personal Systems Group (PSG) was claimed by HP in 2005 to be "one of the leading vendors of personal computers ("PCs") in the world based on unit volume shipped and annual revenue". PSG dealt with business and consumer PCs and accessories (such as e.g., HP Pavilion, Compaq Presario, and VoodooPC), handheld computing (e.g., iPAQ Pocket PC), digital "connected" entertainment (e.g., HP MediaSmart TVs, HP MediaSmart Servers, HP MediaVaults, DVD+RW drives) and Apple's iPod (until November 2005).

HP Enterprise Business (EB) incorporated HP Technology Services and Enterprise Services (an amalgamation of the former EDS, and what was known as HP Services). HP Enterprise Security Services oversaw professional services such as network security, information security and information assurance/compliancy, HP Software Division, and Enterprise Servers, Storage and Networking Group (ESSN). The Enterprise Servers, Storage and Networking Group (ESSN) oversaw "back end" products like storage and servers. HP Networking (former ProCurve) was responsible for the NW family of products.

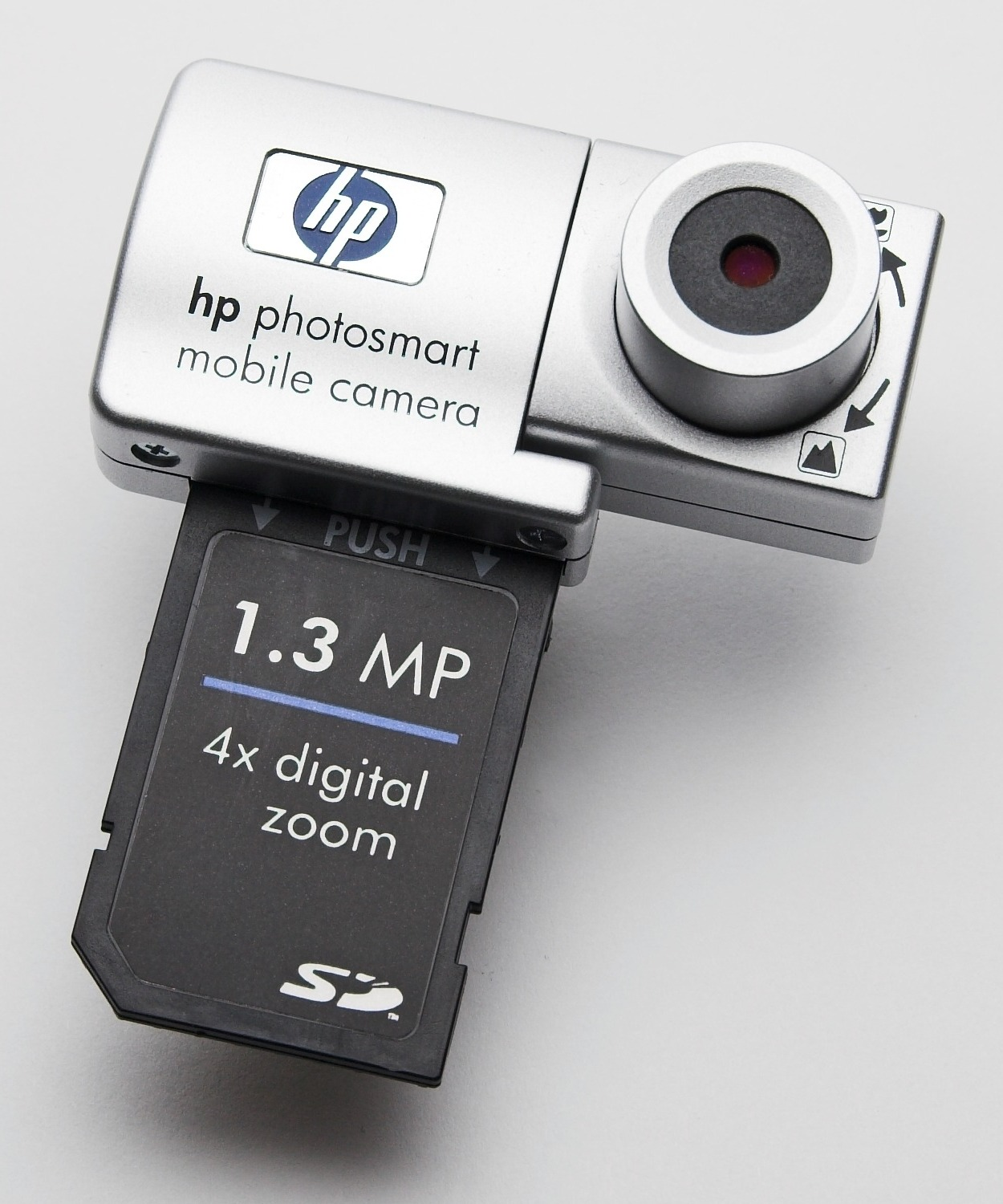
An HP camera with an SDIO interface, designed for use in conjunction with a Pocket PC

HP Software Division was the company's enterprise software unit, which produced and marketed its brand of enterprise-management software, HP OpenView. From September 2005 HP purchased several software companies as part of a publicized, deliberate strategy to augment its software offerings for large business customers. HP Software sold several categories of software, which included business service management software, application lifecycle management software, mobile apps, and enterprise security software (the latter of which included, ArcSight, Fortify Software, Atalla and TippingPoint). HP Software also provided software as a service (SaaS), cloud computing solutions, and software services, including consulting, education, professional services, and support.

HP's Office of Strategy and Technology had four main functions: To steer the company's $3.6 billion research and development investment; foster the development of the company's global technical community; lead the company's strategy and corporate development efforts, and perform worldwide corporate marketing activities.

HP Labs served as the research arm of HP.

HP also offered managed services by which it provides complete IT-support solutions for other companies and organizations. One example of this was offering "Professional Support" and desktop "Premier Support" for Microsoft in the EMEA marketplace. This was done from the Leixlip campus near Dublin, Sofia and Israel. Support was offered for Microsoft Windows, Exchange, SharePoint, and some office applications.

== Staff and culture ==
=== Notable people ===
- Michael Capellas, final chairman/CEO of Compaq; HP President up until November 12, 2002
- Barney Oliver, founder and director of HP Labs
- Steve Wozniak
- Tom Perkins
- Carly Fiorina, 2016 Republican presidential candidate
- Matt Shaheen, management consultant executive at HP Enterprise Services in Plano, Texas; Republican member of the Texas House of Representatives
- Enrique Lores, current president/CEO of HP Inc.

== Corporate social responsibility ==
The company philosophy, known as the HP Way, included the directive "To honor our obligations to society by being an economic, intellectual and social asset to each nation and each community in which we operate." From the 1940s through the 1990s, the company was unusual for its dedication to improving neighboring communities. Many employees volunteered their personal time to various civic projects. The workers embraced this role: morale at HP was phenomenally high from 1955 to 1965. Their dedication to social responsibility spread through Silicon Valley to other tech companies, notably to Intel.

In July 2007, the company announced that it had met its 2004 target to recycle one billion pounds of electronics, toner, and ink cartridges. It set a new goal of recycling a further two billion pounds of hardware by the end of 2010. In 2006, the company recovered 187 million pounds of electronics.

In September 2009, Newsweek ranked HP No. 1 on its 2009 Green Rankings of America's 500 largest corporations. According to Environmental Leader (now Environment + Energy Leader), "Hewlett-Packard earned its number one position due to its greenhouse gas (GHG) emission reduction programs, and was the first major IT company to report GHG emissions associated with its supply chain, according to the ranking (HP released its supply chain emissions data in 2008). In addition, HP has made an effort to remove toxic substances from its products, though Greenpeace has targeted the company for not doing better."

The company's 2009 Global Citizen report won best corporate responsibility report of the year, and claims HP decreased its total energy use by 9 percent when compared with 2008. HP recovered a total of 118,000 tonnes of electronic products and supplies for recycling in 2009, including 61 million print cartridges.

HP earned recognition of its work in data privacy and security. In 2010 the company ranked No. 4 in the Ponemon Institute's annual study of the most trusted companies for privacy. Since 2006, HP has worked directly with the U.S. Congress, the Federal Trade Commission (FTC), and the Department of Commerce to establish a new strategy for federal legislation. HP played a key role in work toward the December 2010 FTC report "Protecting Consumer Privacy in an Era of Rapid Change".

HP took the top spot on Corporate Responsibility Magazine's 100 Best Corporate Citizens List for 2010. HP beat other Russell 1000 Index companies because of its leadership in seven categories including environment, climate changes and corporate philanthropy (in 2009, HP was ranked fifth).

Fortune magazine named HP one of the World's Most Admired Companies in 2010, placing it at No. 2 in the computer industry and No. 32 overall in its list of the top 50. In 2010, HP was ranked No. 1 in social responsibility, long-term investment, global competitiveness, and use of corporate assets.

In an April 2010 San Francisco Chronicle article, HP was one of 12 companies commended for "designing products to be safe from the start, following the principles of green chemistry". The commendations came from Environment California, an environmental advocacy group, who praised select companies in California and the Bay Area for their conservational efforts.

In May 2010, HP was named one of the World's Most Ethical Companies by Ethisphere Institute. It was one of 100 companies to earn the distinction of top winner and was the only computer hardware vendor to be recognized.

After winning nine straight annual "Most Respected Company in China" awards from the Economic Observer and Peking University, HP China added the "10 Year Contribution" award to its list of accolades.

In May 2011, HP released a Global Responsibility report covering accomplishments in 2010. It provides a comprehensive view of HP's global citizenship programs, performance, and goals and describes how HP used its technology, influence, and expertise to make a positive impact on the world.

HP was listed in Greenpeace's Guide to Greener Electronics that ranks electronics manufacturers according to their policies on sustainability, energy and climate, and green products. In November 2011, HP secured first place (out of 15) in this ranking with a score of 5.9. It scored the most points on the new Sustainable Operations criteria, having the best program for measuring and reducing emissions of greenhouse gases from its suppliers and scoring maximum points for its thorough paper procurement policy. In the November 2012 report, HP was ranked second with a score of 5.7.

In its 2012 rankings of consumer electronics companies on progress relating to conflict minerals, the Enough Project rated HP second out of 24 companies.

== Brand ==
According to a 2009 BusinessWeek study, HP was the world's 11th most valuable brand.

After the acquisition of Compaq in 2002, HP maintained the Compaq Presario brand on low-end home desktops and laptops, the HP Compaq brand on business desktops and laptops, and the HP ProLiant brand on Intel-architecture servers. The HP Pavilion brand was used on home entertainment laptops and all home desktops. Tandem's "NonStop" servers were rebranded as "HP Integrity NonStop".

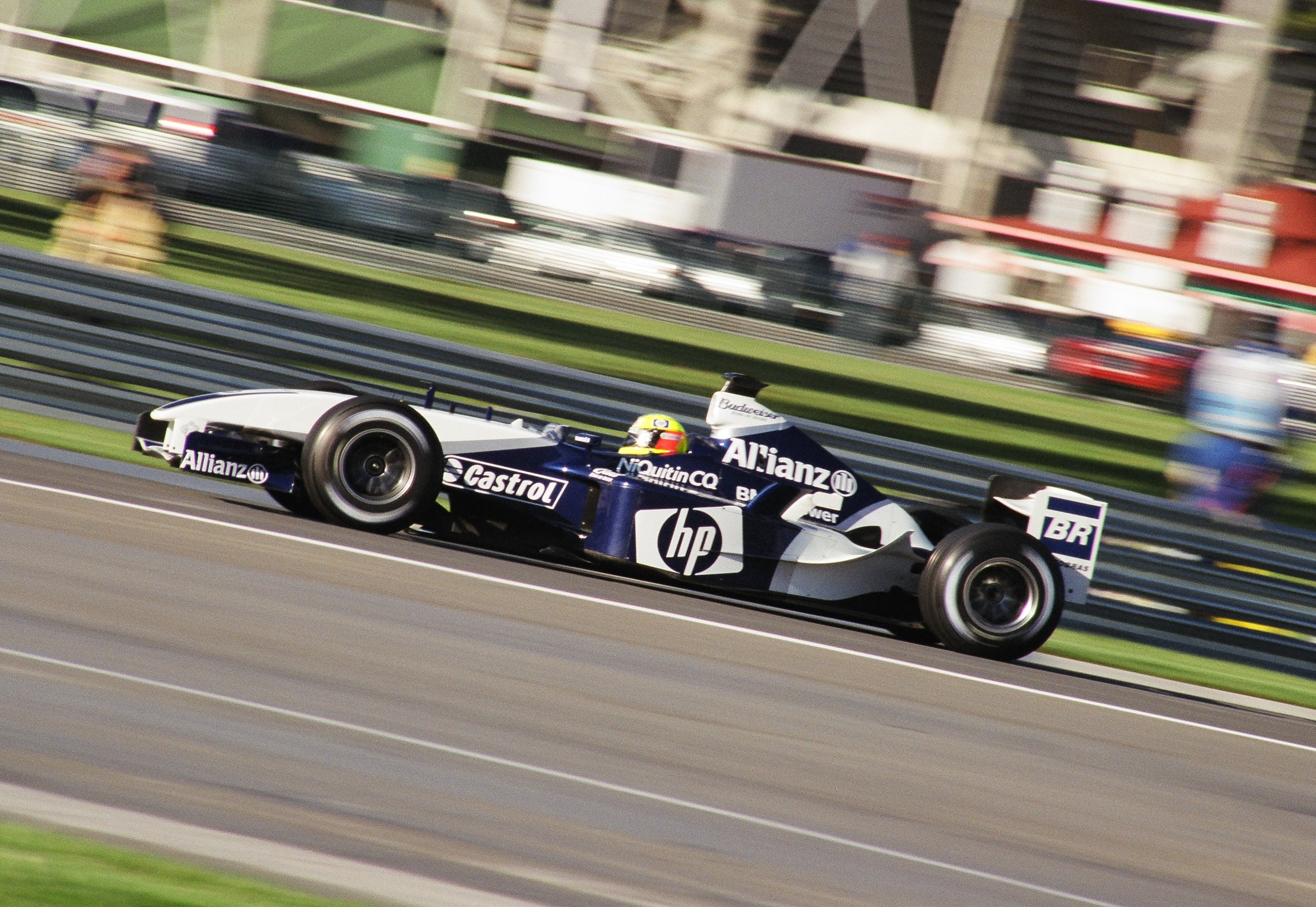
A Hewlett-Packard sponsored Williams FW25, 2003

HP had many sponsorships, such as Mission: SPACE in Epcot at the Walt Disney World Resort. From 1995 to 1999, and again from 2013 to 2014, HP had been the shirt sponsor of Premier League club Tottenham Hotspur F.C. From 1997 to 1999 it sponsored Australian Football League club North Melbourne Football Club. It also sponsored the Jordan Grand Prix from 1999 to 2001, Stewart Grand Prix in 1999, Jaguar Racing from 2000 to 2002, BMW Williams Formula 1 team from 2002 to 2005 (which was formerly sponsored by Compaq prior to the merger from 2000 to 2001), and Renault F1 from 2010 to 2011. In 2024, HP became the title sponsor of Scuderia Ferrari.

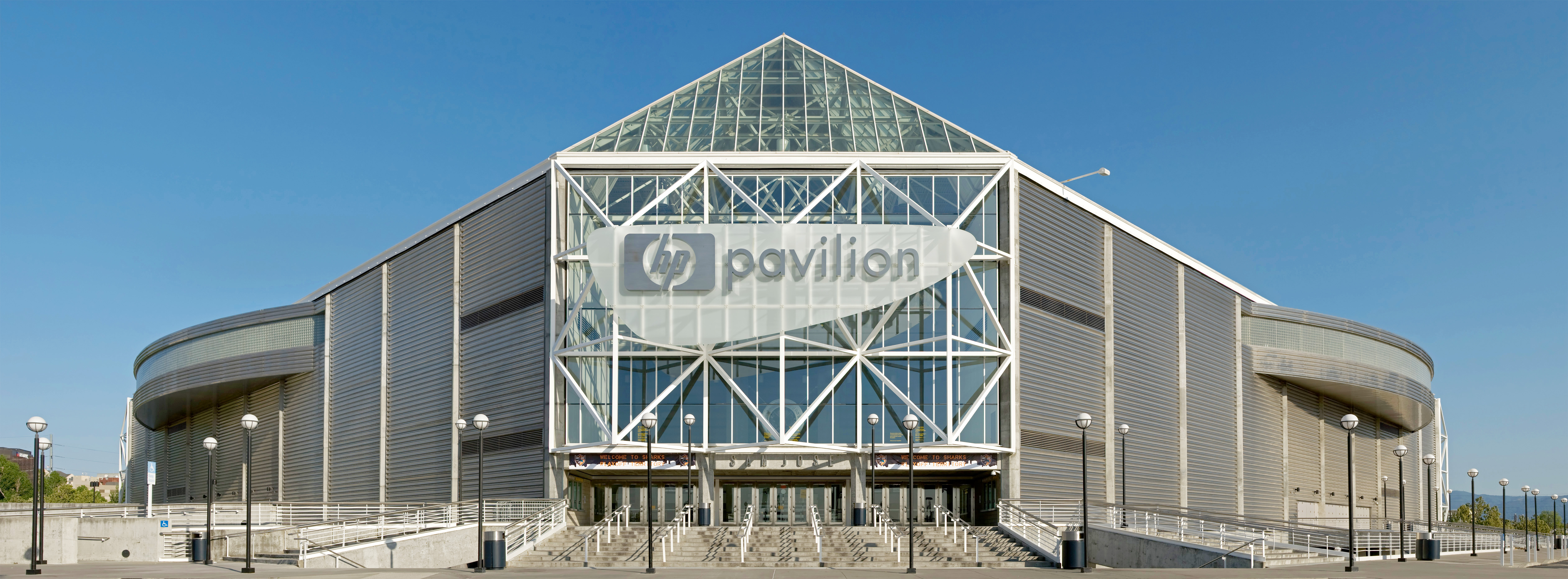
The company sponsored the HP Pavilion at San Jose (now SAP Center at San Jose), home to the NHL's San Jose Sharks.

HP also had the naming rights arrangement for the HP Pavilion at San Jose, which was previously held by Compaq prior to the merger as the Compaq Center at San Jose, those naming rights were acquired by SAP AG and consequently renamed SAP Center at San Jose. HP also maintained a number of corporate sponsorships in the business sector, including sponsorships of trade organisations including Fespa (print trade exhibitions), and O'Reilly Media's Velocity (web development) conference.

== Controversies ==
=== Employee death in fall from airplane ===
On December 14, 2000, Elisabeth M. Otto, an employee at HP, fell to her death from a commuter flight shortly after takeoff under suspicious circumstances. The flight was a routine commute for HP employees, shuttling them from Roseville to Palo Alto, California. No one reported the incident until after the plane had landed.

Authorities concluded that Otto had most likely opened the door herself and jumped to her death from an altitude of about 2,000 feet. Her body was later found in a garden. It is believed that the reason why the incident was not immediately reported was due to confusion resulting from the shock of passengers and the loud noise from the open door. Apparently one of the other employees had struggled with Otto while trying to prevent her from jumping from the de Havilland Canada DHC-6 Twin Otter but was unable to stop her.

When the co-pilot came to close the open door, passengers apparently attempted to explain what had happened but this was not understood due to noise. An airplane mechanic reported the incident about 40 minutes after the flight had landed.

=== Restatement ===
In March 2003, HP restated its first-quarter cash flow from operations, reducing it by 18 percent because of an accounting error. The actual cash flow from operations was $647 million, and not $791 million as reported; HP shifted $144 million to net cash used in investing activities.

=== Spying scandal ===
On September 5, 2006, Shawn Cabalfin and David O'Neil of Newsweek wrote that HP's general counsel, at the behest of chairwoman Patricia Dunn, contracted a team of independent security experts to investigate board members and several journalists to identify the source of an information leak. In turn, those security experts recruited private investigators who used pretexting, which involved investigators impersonating HP board members and nine journalists (including reporters for CNET, The New York Times and The Wall Street Journal) in order to obtain their phone records. The information leaked related to HP's long-term strategy and was published as part of a CNET article in January 2006. Most HP employees accused of criminal acts have since been acquitted.

=== Hardware ===
In November 2007, HP released a BIOS update covering a wide range of laptops with the intent to speed up the computer fan and have it run constantly while the computer was on or off to prevent the overheating of defective Nvidia graphics processing units (GPUs) which had been shipped to many of the original equipment manufacturers, including HP, Dell, and Apple. The defect concerned the new material used by Nvidia from 2007 onwards in joining the graphics chip onto the motherboard, which did not perform well under thermal cycling and was prone to develop stress cracks – effectively severing the connection between the GPU and the motherboard and leading to a blank screen.

In July 2008, HP issued an extension to the initial one-year warranty to replace the motherboards of selected models. However, this option was not extended to all models with the defective Nvidia chipsets, despite research showing that these computers were also affected by the fault. The replacement of the motherboard was a temporary fix, since the fault was inherent in all units of the affected models from the point of manufacture, including the replacement motherboards offered by HP.

Since then, several websites have been documenting the issue. There have been several small-claims lawsuits filed in several states, as well as suits filed in other countries. HP also faced a class-action lawsuit in 2009 over its i7 processor computers: the complainants stated that their systems consistently froze within 30 minutes of powering on. Even after being replaced with newer i7 systems, the problem continued.

=== Lawsuit against Oracle ===
In 2011, HP filed a lawsuit in California Superior Court in Santa Clara, claiming that Oracle had breached an agreement to support the Itanium microprocessor used in HP's high-end enterprise servers. On June 15, 2011, HP sent a "formal legal demand" letter to Oracle in an attempt to force it to reverse its decision to discontinue software development on Intel Itanium microprocessors and build its own servers. HP won the lawsuit in 2012, which required Oracle to continue producing software compatible with the Itanium processor. HP was awarded $3 billion in damages against Oracle on June 30, 2016, arguing that Oracle canceling support damaged HP's Itanium server brand. Oracle said it would appeal both the decision and damages.

=== HP wage and hour lawsuit ===
Several class action firms filed a class action lawsuit on January 12, 2012, against HP Inc. and Hewlett Packard Enterprise ("HP"), entitled "Jeffrey Wall, etc. v. HP, Inc." (formerly known as Hewlett-Packard Company, et al.), Case No. 30-2012-00537897, pending in the Superior Court of California, County of Orange. According to the lawsuit, HP allegedly failed to pay commission payments and incentive compensation that its California sales employees were owed within the timeframes proscribed by California law (Labor Code §§ 201, 202 and 204). In 2017, FDAzar obtained a settlement of $25 million for class participants and changed the way HP pays incentive compensation and commission payments.

=== Takeover of Autonomy ===
In November 2012, HP recorded a write-down of around $8.8 billion related to its acquisition a year earlier of the UK-based Autonomy Corporation PLC. At that time, HP had fired its previous CEO for expenses irregularities a year before, and appointed Apotheker. HP was seen as problematic by the market. Autonomy was acquired by HP in October 2011. HP paid $10.3 billion for 87.3% of the shares, valuing Autonomy at around $11.7 billion (£7.4 billion) overall, a premium of 79% over market price. The deal was widely criticized as "absurdly high", a "botched strategy shift" and a "chaotic" attempt to reposition HP and enhance earnings, and was objected to by HP's own CFO. Within a year, Apotheker was fired, major culture clashes became apparent, and HP wrote off $8.8 billion of Autonomy's value.

The Serious Fraud Office (SFO) and the SEC joined the FBI in investigating the potential anomalies. HP incurred damage with its stock falling to its lowest in decades. Three lawsuits were brought by shareholders against HP for the fall in value of HP shares. In August 2014, a United States district court judge threw out a proposed settlement, which Autonomy's previous management had argued would be collusive and intended to divert scrutiny of HP's own responsibility and knowledge. It essentially engaged the plaintiff's attorneys from the existing cases and redirected them against the previous Autonomy vendors and management for a fee of up to $48 million, with plaintiffs agreeing to end any claims against HP's management and similarly redirect those claims against the previous Autonomy vendors and management. In January 2015 the SFO closed its investigation as the likelihood of a successful prosecution was low. The dispute continued in the US, and is being investigated by the UK and Ireland Financial Reporting Council. On June 9, 2015, HP agreed to pay $100 million to investors who bought HP shares between August 19, 2011 and November 20, 2012, to settle the lawsuits over the Autonomy purchase.

Another term of the shareholder settlement was to sue Autonomy management, which occurred in London in 2019. HP "failed to produce a smoking gun for the fraud it alleges", and its accountants admitted that they "never formally prepared anything to attribute the irregularities to the amount of the fraud".

In June 2024, a jury acquitted Autonomy founder Mike Lynch and co-defendant Steve Chamberlain. Steve Chamberlain was hit by a car while jogging on August 17, 2024. Mike Lynch, along with his 18 year old daughter, drowned after their yacht sank on August 20, 2024 (the accident killed a total of seven people).

In July 2025, a judge at London's High Court ruled that HP is owed more than 700 million pounds ($944 million), in respect of the acquisition of Autonomy.

=== Israeli settlements ===
Hewlett-Packard supplies a range of technology solutions and hardware infrastructure to various Israeli institutions, including the military, government agencies, and law enforcement bodies. Among its notable clients is the Israeli Population and Immigration Authority, to which the company provides dedicated technological support and equipment.

On October 25, 2012, Richard Falk, the United Nations Human Rights Council's Special Rapporteur on the situation of human rights in the Palestinian territories occupied since 1967, called to boycott HP and other businesses that profit from Israeli settlements on occupied Palestinian lands until they brought their operations in line with international human rights and humanitarian law. In 2014, the Presbyterian Church (USA) voted to move forward with divestment from HP to pressure Israel in regard to their policies toward Palestinians. In 2015, the Human Rights Commission of Portland, Oregon, requested to place Caterpillar, G4S, HP, and Motorola Solutions on the city's "Do Not Buy" list.

=== Bribery ===
On April 9, 2014, an administrative proceeding before the SEC was settled by HP consenting to an order acknowledging that HP had violated the Foreign Corrupt Practices Act (FCPA) when HP subsidiaries in Russia, Poland, and Mexico made improper payments to government officials to obtain or retain lucrative public contracts.

The SEC's order found that HP's subsidiary in Russia paid more than $2 million through agents and various shell companies to a Russian government official to retain a multimillion-dollar contract with the federal prosecutor's office; in Poland, HP's subsidiary provided gifts and cash bribes worth more than $600,000 to a Polish government official to obtain contracts with the national police agency; and to win a software sale to Mexico's state-owned petroleum company, HP's subsidiary in Mexico paid more than $1 million in inflated commissions to a consultant with close ties to company officials, one of whom was funneled money. HP agreed to pay $108 million to settle the SEC charges and a parallel criminal case.

== See also ==
- ArcSight
- Fortify
- HP calculators
- HP Linux Imaging and Printing
- HP Software & Solutions
- List of acquisitions by Hewlett-Packard
- List of computer system manufacturers
- List of Hewlett-Packard products
- TippingPoint
- Hewlett-Packard Credit Union
