= HP Garage =

Founding site of the company Hewlett-Packard

- Hewlett Packard House and Garage
- U.S. National Register of Historic Places
- California Historical Landmark
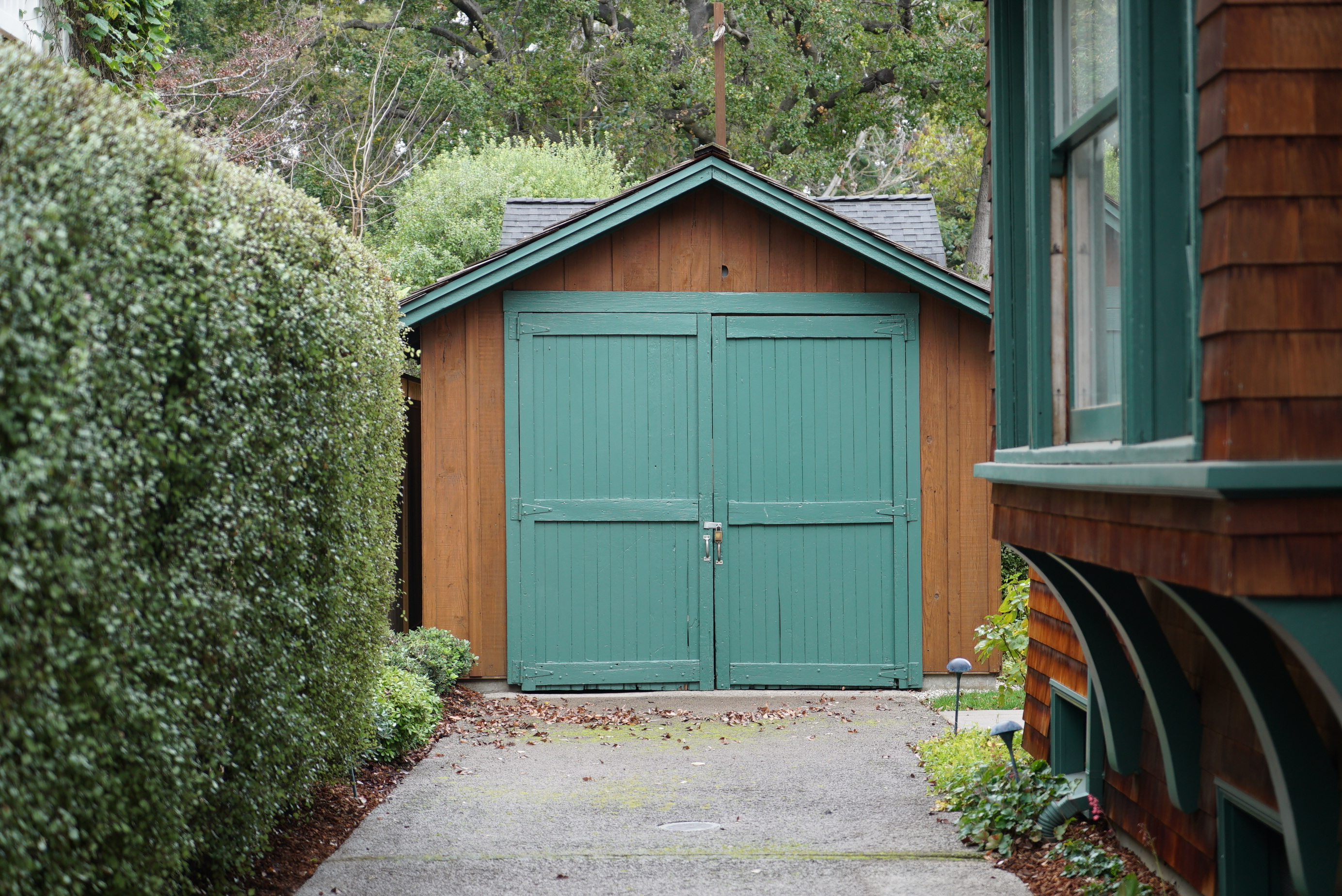
- The HP Garage in January 2020

- Location within San Francisco Bay Area Location within California Location within the United States
- Location: 367 Addison Avenue, Palo Alto, California
- Coordinates: 37.44307°N 122.15481°W
- Area: less than one acre
- Built: 1905
- Architectural style: Bungalow/Craftsman
- NRHP reference No.: 07000307
- CHISL No.: 976

Significant dates
- Added to NRHP: April 20, 2007
- Designated CHISL: 1987

The HP Garage is a private museum where the company Hewlett-Packard (HP) was founded. It is located at 367 Addison Avenue in Palo Alto, California. It is considered to be the "Birthplace of Silicon Valley". In the 1930s, Stanford University and its Dean of Engineering Frederick Terman began encouraging faculty and graduates to stay in the area instead of leaving California, and develop a high-tech region. HP founders Bill Hewlett and David Packard are considered the first Stanford students who took Terman's advice.

The garage has since been designated a California Historical Landmark and is listed on the National Register of Historic Places. Though not open for public tours, the property can be viewed from the sidewalk and driveway.

== History ==
The home, originally designated as 367 Addison Avenue, was first occupied in 1905 by John Spencer, his wife Ione, and their two adult daughters. John Spencer became Palo Alto's first mayor in 1909. In 1918, the house was divided into two separate apartments, numbered 367 and 369.

In 1937, David "Dave" Packard, then 25 years old, visited William "Bill" Hewlett in Palo Alto and the pair had their first business meeting. Both men attended Stanford University, where its Dean of Engineering Frederick Terman encouraged his students to establish their own electronics companies in the area instead of leaving California.

In 1938, newly married Dave and Lucile Packard moved into 367 Addison Ave, the first-floor three-room apartment, with Bill Hewlett sleeping in the shed. Mrs. Spencer, now widowed, moved into the second-floor apartment, 369 Addison. Hewlett and Packard began to use the one-car garage, with $538 (equivalent to $12,305 in 2025) in capital.

In 1939, Packard and Hewlett formed their partnership with a coin toss, creating the name Hewlett-Packard.

Hewlett-Packard's first product, built in the garage, was an audio oscillator, the HP 200A. One of Hewlett-Packard's first customers was Walt Disney Studios, which purchased eight oscillators to test and certify the sound systems in theaters that were going to run the first major film released in stereophonic sound, Fantasia.

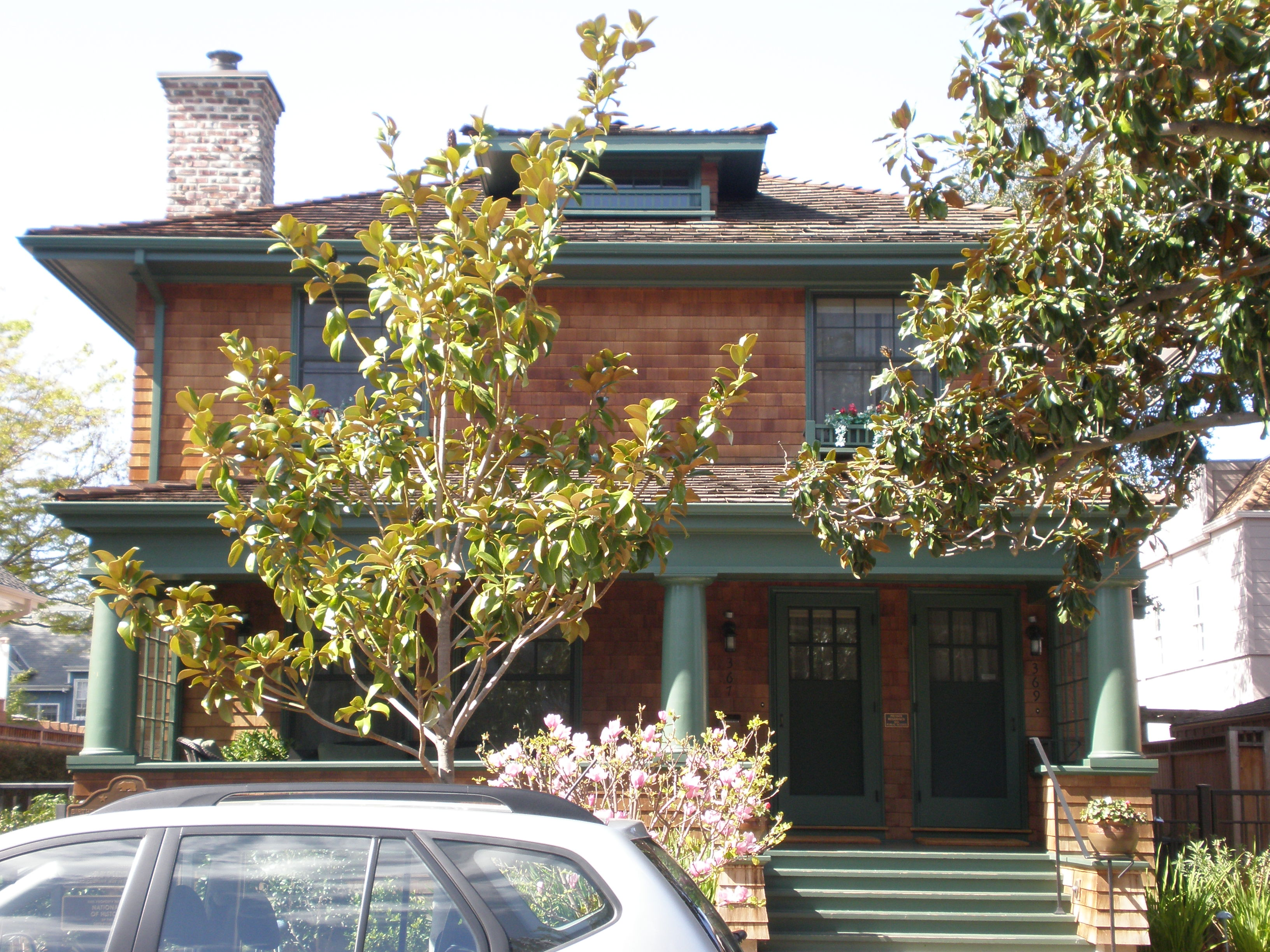
367-369 Addison Avenue

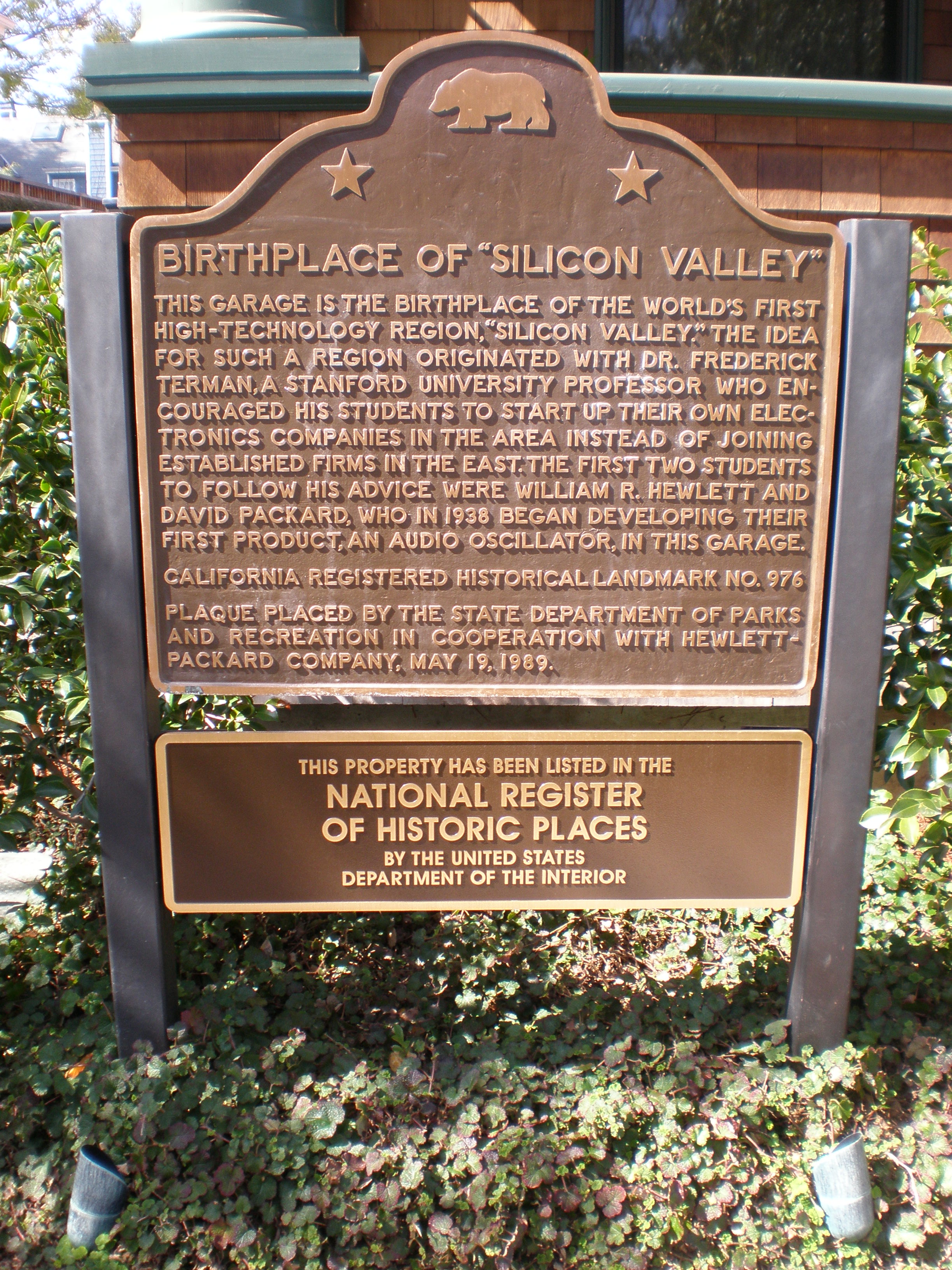
California Historic Landmark plaque

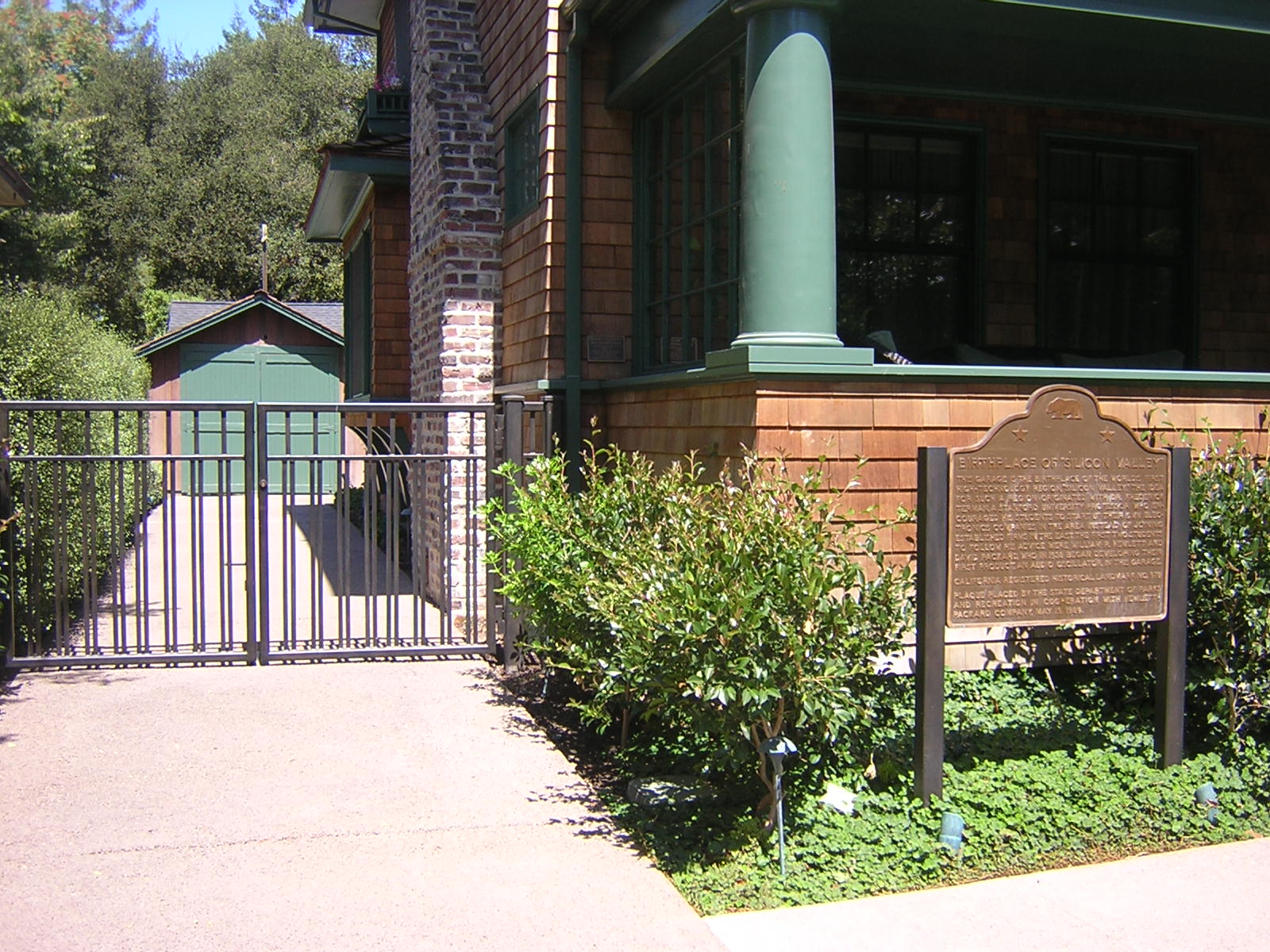
Garage as seen from front walk

== Historical designations ==
- California registered landmark, 1987
- National Register of Historic Places, 2007
