= ArcSight =

Cyber security product

ArcSight, Inc.

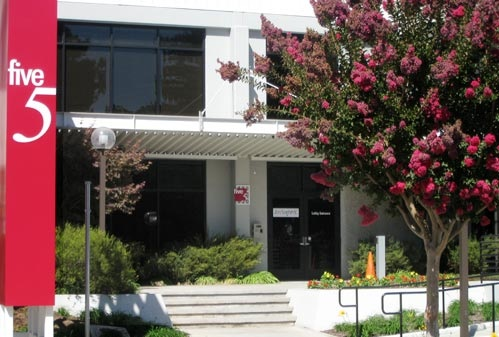
- Industry: Computer software, Cyber security management, Enterprise software
- Founded: 2000
- Defunct: 2010
- Successor: Acquired by Hewlett-Packard in 2010; became a subsidiary of Hewlett Packard Enterprise; sold to Micro Focus in 2016 and then OpenText in 2023
- Key people: Alex Daly (founding CEO); Hugh Njemanze (founding CTO)
- Website: www.microfocus.com/arcsight

ArcSight, Inc. was an American software company that provided security management and compliance software packages for enterprises and government agencies. The company was acquired by Hewlett-Packard (HP) in 2010. When HP split into two companies, HP Inc. and Hewlett Packard Enterprise, HP's ArcSight subsidiary was transferred to the latter company. HPE later sold the ArcSight subsidiary to Micro Focus. OpenText acquired Micro Focus (including ArcSight) in 2023.

ArcSight by OpenText is a cybersecurity product, first released in 2000, that provides big data security analytics and intelligence software for security information and event management (SIEM) and log management. ArcSight is designed to help customers identify and prioritize security threats, organize and track incident response activities, and simplify audit and compliance activities.

== History ==
ArcSight was incorporated in May 2000, and was initially headquartered in Cupertino, California. Alex Daly was the founding CEO and Hugh Njemanze was the founding CTO. Pravin Kothari was the founding Vice President of Engineering. Pat Figley was the first Director of Sales. ArcSight originally was called Wahoo Technologies.

The company was formally named ArcSight in March 2001.

In July 2001, Alex Daly was succeeded by Robert Shaw as CEO. ArcSight filed for initial public offering on September 11, 2007 and offered its shares on February 14, 2008 under symbol ARST. It was the only Silicon Valley company to enter Nasdaq in 2008, during the Great Recession when few other technology companies went public. Tom Reilly was appointed as CEO in 2008. Robert Shaw retired effective October 1, 2008, citing health reasons.

In September 2010, HP announced an agreement to acquire ArcSight for approximately $1.5 billion. ArcSight launched version 5.0 of its Logger and ESM technology, as well as IdentityView 2.0. On October 22, 2010, it completed its acquisition. ArcSight said it had more than a thousand customers at that time.

On September 7, 2016, HPE CEO Meg Whitman announced that the software assets of Hewlett Packard Enterprise, including Arcsight and the rest of the HP Enterprise Security Products group, would be spun out and then merged with Micro Focus to create an independent company of which HP Enterprise shareholders would retain majority ownership. Micro Focus CEO Kevin Loosemore called the transaction "entirely consistent with our established acquisition strategy and our focus on efficient management of mature infrastructure products" and indicated that Micro Focus intended to "bring the core earnings margin for the mature assets in the deal - about 80 percent of the total - from 21 percent today to Micro Focus's existing 46 percent level within three years." The merge concluded on September 1, 2017.

As of January 2019, the ArcSight portfolio has released ArcSight ESM version 7.0, ArcSight Express version 5.0, Arcsight Investigate version 2.20, and ArcSight Data Platform version 2.31 (including ArcSight's Logger, ArcMC and Event Broker technology).

On February 14, 2019, Micro Focus announced it had acquired Interset, a security analytics software company that provides cyber-threat protection, with plans to use Interset's technology to add additional value to Micro Focus ArcSight.
