= HP 200A =

Audio oscillator made by Hewlett-Packard

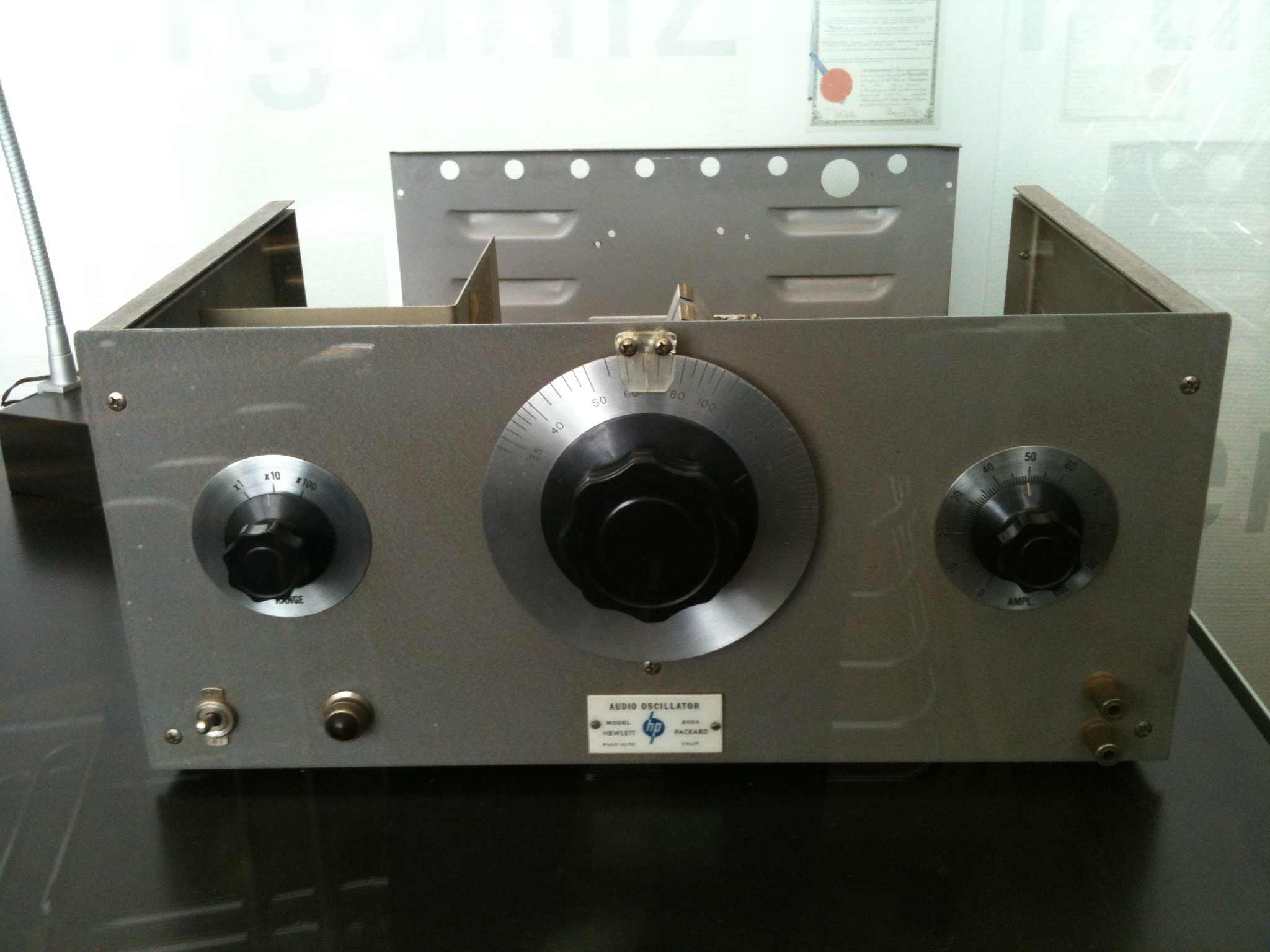
HP 200A front panel

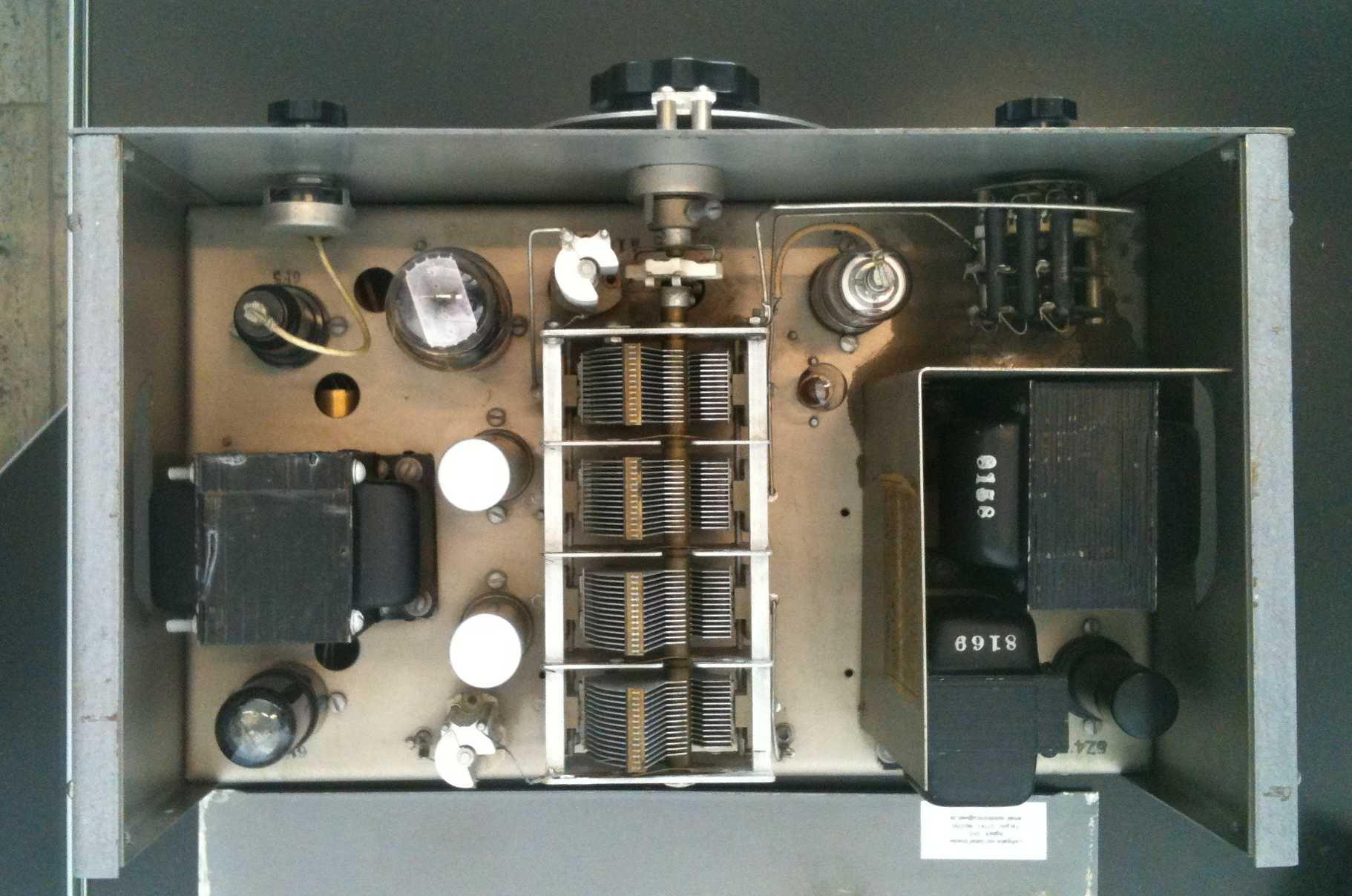
Insides of the Hewlett-Packard HP 200A. The light bulb repurposed as a positive temperature coefficient resistor is to the right of the upper section of the variable capacitor, which is the large structure in the center.

The HP 200A Audio Oscillator, first built in 1938, was the first product made by Hewlett-Packard and was manufactured in David Packard's garage in Palo Alto, California.

It was a low-distortion audio oscillator used for testing sound equipment. It used the Wien bridge oscillator circuit, that had been the subject of Bill Hewlett's masters thesis. It was also the first such commercial oscillator to use a simple light bulb as the temperature-dependent resistor in its feedback network. The light bulb was an inexpensive and effective automatic gain control that not only kept the oscillator output amplitude constant, but it also kept the oscillator's loop gain near unity. The latter is a key technique for achieving a low distortion oscillator. Earlier, Larned Meacham had used light bulbs in bridge circuits to stabilize and linearize oscillators in 1938.

The product code was chosen to give the impression that HP was an established company. A variation, the HP 200B, was customized for Walt Disney, which bought eight units for use in the production of Fantasia.

The circuit diagram is shown in Hewlett's 1939 patent.

Specifications
	HP 200A	HP 200B
Frequency range	35 Hz-35 kHz in 3 range X1: 35-350 Hz; X10: 350-3500 Hz; X100: 3500- 35 000 Hz	20 Hz-20 kHz in 3 range X1: 20-200 Hz; X10: 200-2000 Hz; X100: 2000- 20 000 Hz
Scale of dialer	35-350	20-200
Calibration accuracy	less than 2%	less than 2%
Output power	1 W 500 Ω load	1 W 500 Ω load
Distortion	less than 1% between 35 Hz and 15 kHz	less than 1% between 35 Hz and 15 kHz
Output impedance	less than 75Ω under 15 kHz	less than 75Ω under 15 kHz
Power voltage	115 V 50-60 Hz 60 W	115 V 50-60 Hz 60 W

== Development ==
Through the 1940s and into the 1950s, the subsequent versions of the 200A covered different and wider frequency ranges. The latest version was the 200CD. It covered from the subaudio 5 Hz to the low end (Long Wave) of the AM radio band at 600 kilohertz. The 200CD became a ubiquitous audio generator in engineering laboratories worldwide from the 1950s to the 1990s.

== Operation ==
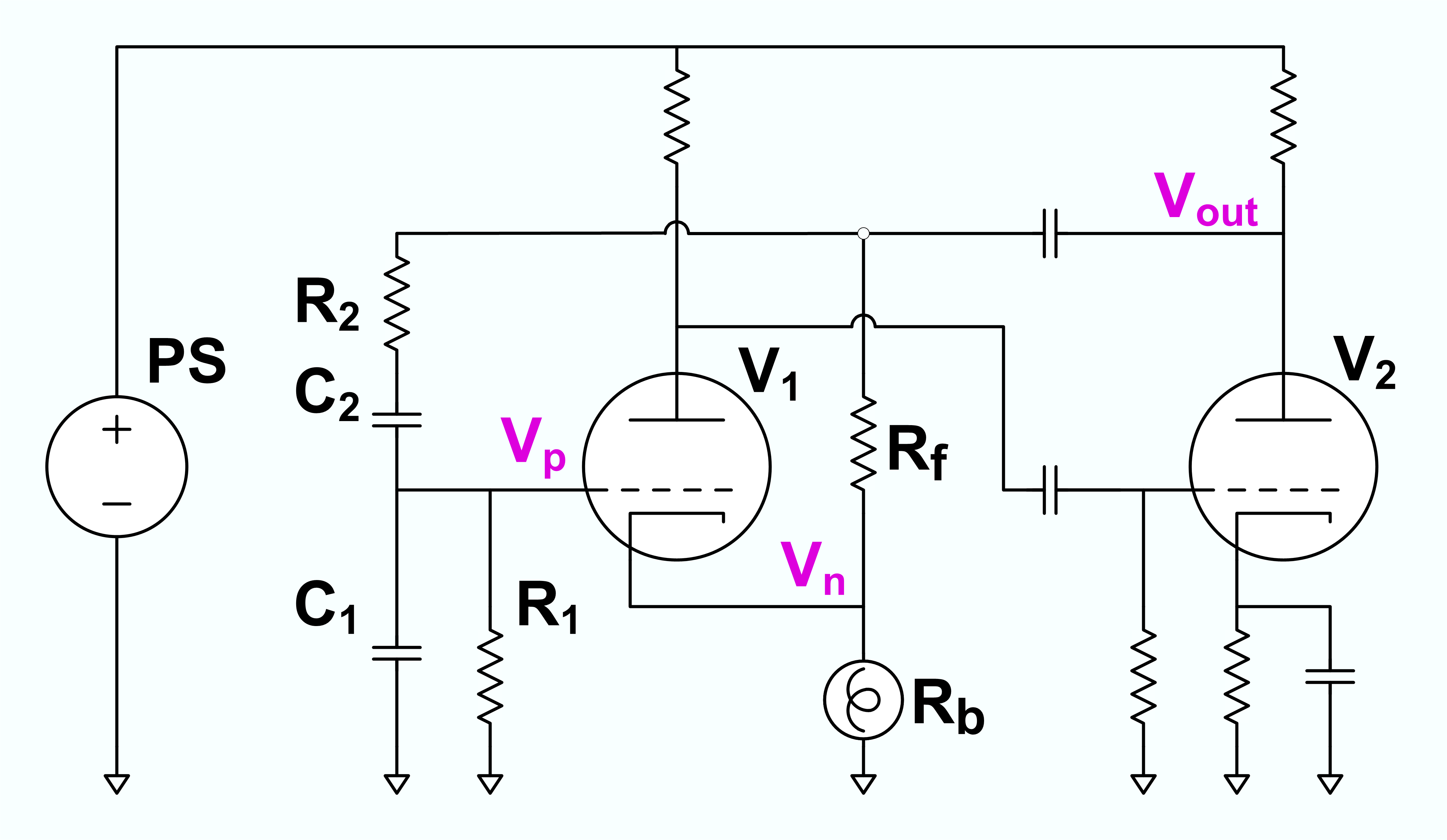
Simplified schematic of a Wien bridge oscillator from Hewlett's US patent 2,268,872. Unmarked capacitors have enough capacitance to be considered short circuits at signal frequency. Unmarked resistors are considered to be appropriate values for biasing and loading the vacuum tubes. Node labels and reference designators in this figure are not the same as used in the patent. The vacuum tubes indicated in Hewlett's patent were pentodes rather than the triodes shown here.

William R. Hewlett's Wien bridge oscillator can be considered as a combination of a differential amplifier and a Wien bridge, connected in a positive feedback loop between the amplifier output and differential inputs. At the oscillating frequency, the bridge is almost balanced and has very small transfer ratio. The loop gain is a product of the very high amplifier gain and the very low bridge ratio. In Hewlett's circuit, the amplifier is implemented by two vacuum tubes.

The amplifier's inverting input is the cathode of tube V_{1} and the non-inverting input is the control grid of tube V_{2}. To simplify analysis, all the components other than R_{1}, R_{2}, C_{1} and C_{2} can be modeled as a non-inverting amplifier with a gain of 1+R_{f}/R_{b} and with a high input impedance. R_{1}, R_{2}, C_{1} and C_{2} form a bandpass filter which is connected to provide positive feedback at the frequency of oscillation. R_{b} self heats and increases the negative feedback which reduces the amplifier gain until the point is reached that there is just enough gain to sustain sinusoidal oscillation without over driving the amplifier.

If R_{1} = R_{2} and C_{1} = C_{2} then at equilibrium R_{f}/R_{b} = 2 and the amplifier gain is 3. When the circuit is first energized, the lamp is cold and the gain of the circuit is greater than 3 which ensures start up. The dc bias current of vacuum tube V1 also flows through the lamp. This does not change the principles of the circuit's operation, but it does reduce the amplitude of the output at equilibrium because the bias current provides part of the heating of the lamp.
