= Lamson =

Lamson may refer to:

== Surname ==
- Chuck Lamson (1939–2015), American football player
- Father Lamson, 19th-century American eccentric, attended abolitionist meetings in a long white beard and white robe, and carrying a large scythe
- Fred I. Lamson (1910–1981), American politician, Mayor of Malden, Massachusetts, and member of the Massachusetts Senate
- George Henry Lamson (1852–1882), American doctor and murderer
- Gertrude Lamson, or Nance O'Neil (1874–1965), American actress of stage and silent cinema of the early 20th century
- Justin Lamson (born 2002), American football player
- Laura Lamson (1948–2008), American screenwriter and university lecturer, based in England throughout her career
- Lucy Stedman Lamson (1857–1926), American business woman, educator
- Otis Lamson (1876–1956), American football player and coach
- Roswell Lamson (1838–1903), officer in the United States Navy during the American Civil War
- William Lamson (born 1977), American installation, performance and generative artist

== Middle name ==
- Carl Lamson Carmer (1893–1976), American author of nonfiction, memoirs and novels
- Mortimer Lamson Earle (1864–1905), American classical scholar
- Edward Lamson Henry (1841–1919), American genre painter
- Flora Lamson Hewlett (1914–1977), American philanthropist
- Nathaniel Lamson Howard (1884–1949), American railroad executive
- Thomas Ludington (born 1953), United States federal judge
- Edwin Lamson Stanton (1814–1869), Secretary of War under the Lincoln Administration during most of the American Civil War

== Buildings ==
- Lamson Farm, a working 18th century farm and town-owned conservation land in Mont Vernon, New Hampshire
- Newton Lamson House, historic house at 33 Chestnut Street in Stoneham, Massachusetts
- Rufus Lamson House, historic house at 72-74 Hampshire Street in Cambridge, Massachusetts

== Ships ==
- USS Lamson (DD-18), Smith class destroyer in the United States Navy during World War I
- USS Lamson (DD-328), Clemson-class destroyer in the United States Navy following World War I
- USS Lamson (DD-367), Mahan-class destroyer of the United States Navy named for Roswell Hawkes Lamson

== Engineering ==
- Lamson L-106 Alcor, American, high-wing, experimental, pressurized research glider
- Lamson tube, systems in which cylindrical containers are propelled through a network of tubes by compressed air or by partial vacuum
- Lamson Engineering Company Ltd, the best known British manufacturer of Cash Ball, Rapid Wire and Pneumatic tube delivery systems from 1937 to 1976
- Lamson PL-1 Quark, American high-wing, single-seat, glider that was designed and constructed by Philip Lamson, first flying in early 1965

== Other ==
- Battle of Lamson or Operation Lam Son 719, offensive campaign conducted in Laos by the armed forces of the Republic of Vietnam in 1971
- Flora Lamson Hewlett Library, houses one of the largest collections of theological books in the United States

== See also ==
- Lampson (disambiguation)
