= Flora Lamson Hewlett Library =

Central library of the Graduate Theological Union in Berkeley, California

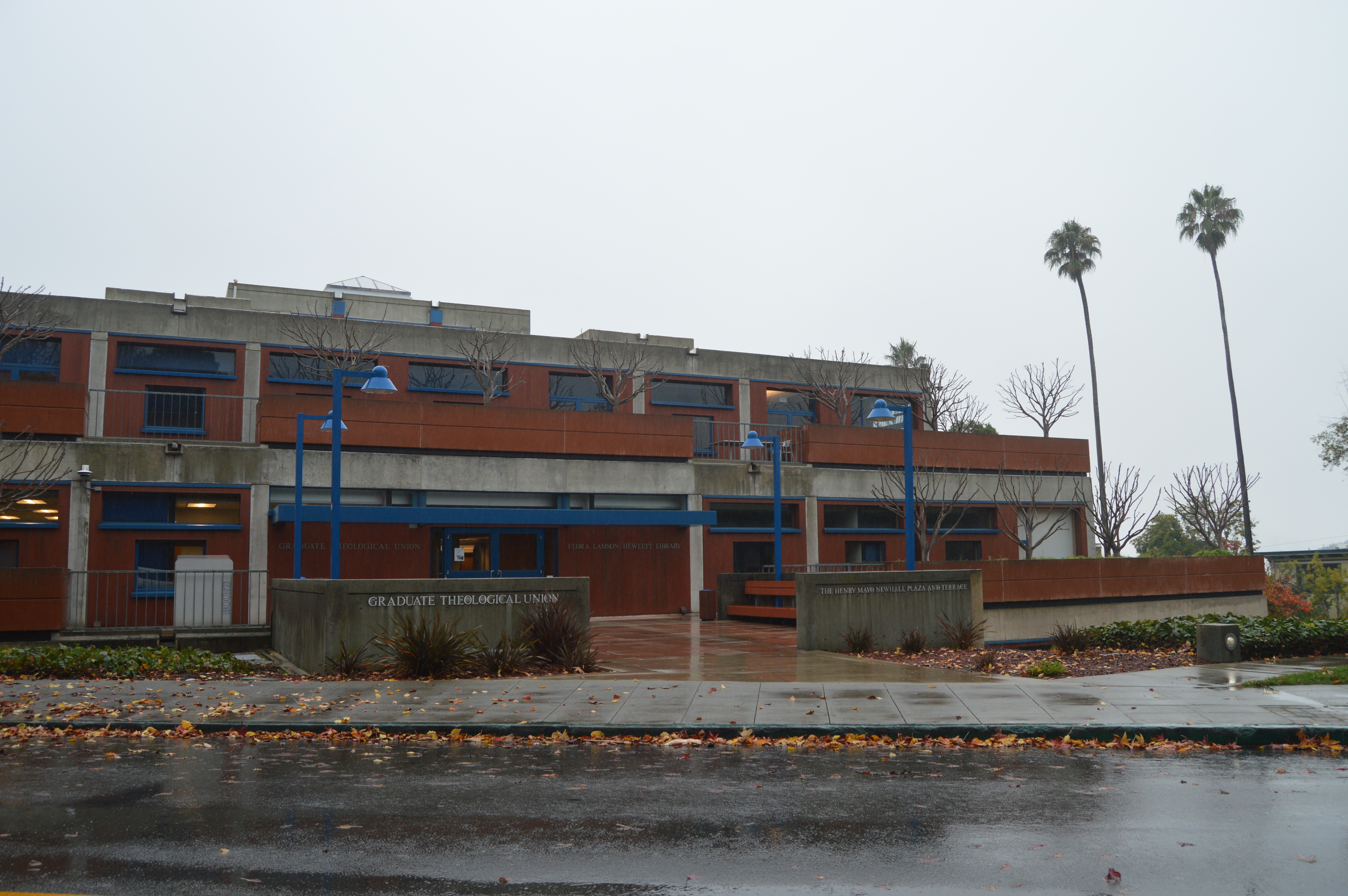

- Location within California

General information
- Type: Theological Library
- Architectural style: Modern
- Location: 2400 Ridge Road, Berkeley, California, USA
- Coordinates: 37.8755°N 122.2618°W
- Completed: 1981, 1987
- Owner: Graduate Theological Union

Technical details
- Floor count: 4

Design and construction
- Architect: Louis Kahn
- Main contractor: Peters, Clayberg, and Caulfield

Website
- http://gtu.edu/library

The Flora Lamson Hewlett Library is the central library of the Graduate Theological Union. Located on the summit of the "Holy Hill" area of Berkeley, California, its collections comprise one of the largest collections of theological works in the United States, with over 500,000 volumes as of 2014. The library's collections are open to the public. Borrower privileges are accessible not only to students and faculty of the GTU's consortial seminaries and affiliated centers, but also to the faculty and students of the University of California, Berkeley, Stanford University, and American Theological Library Association institutions participating in Reciprocal Borrowing. The Hewlett Library also maintains a branch on the campus of San Francisco Theological Seminary at San Anselmo. It also has storage facilities on the campus of the American Baptist Seminary of the West and at Santa Clara University.

== History ==
Prior to the construction of the Hewlett Library and the founding of the GTU, seminaries throughout the Bay Area had cooperative lending programs. As many of the seminaries moved to Berkeley in the wake of the founding of the University of California, Berkeley, projects were initiated that included united cataloging and periodical lists. In 1963, a year after the incorporation of the GTU, John Dillenberger established a GTU Library Committee to find ways to collaborate with regards to research materials between seminaries. In 1969, the GTU Common Library was established and had its first home at the Church Divinity School of the Pacific.

In 1972, the process for designing and constructing the Common Library's building began. The building's distinctive, terraced design was based on preliminary sketches by famed architect Louis I. Kahn. After Kahn's unexpected death in 1974, the GTU selected the San Francisco, California-based architectural firm of Peters, Clayberg, and Caulfield, in association with Esherick Homsey Dodge & Davis, to design the building. Thomas J. Caulfield was appointed lead architect. Built in phases, construction on the building's first phase began in 1979, and it opened in 1981. The final phase of the building was completed in 1987. The library was named for Flora Lamson Hewlett, wife of Hewlett-Packard founder William Hewlett, thanks to support for the project from the William and Flora Hewlett Foundation.

== Events ==
To kick off Theological Libraries Month the Hewlett Library holds a booksale on the feast day of Saint Jerome (September 30), the patron saint of libraries.

Since 1993, the library has organized and held an annual Reading of the Sacred Text event. Each year the library invites scholars to read and reflect on various oral and written stories to draw parallels between religion and the everyday world. Scholars have spoke on both Eastern and Western religions and focused on topics including: feminism, sciences, arts, slavery, and history.

The Library houses regular art exhibits on its upper and lower levels. Displays have ranged from modern paintings to ancient artifacts. Exhibitions are generally on display for 4–6 months.

== Directors of the Hewlett Library ==
- J. Stillson Judah (1969-1977)
- John Baker-Batsel (1977-1990)
- Mary Williams (1990-1997)
- John Dillenberger (Interim 1997-1999)
- Bonnie Hardwick (1999-2006)
- Robert Benedetto (2006-2016)
- Clay-Edward Dixon (Interim, 2016-2021)
- Colyn Wohlmut (2021-)
