= Lampson =

Lampson may refer to:

== Places in the United States ==
- Lampson, Wisconsin, an unincorporated community
- Lampson Field, a public airport in Lake County, California

== Other uses ==
- Lampson (surname)
- Lampson International, an American crane manufacturer
