= HP SPaM =

- HP SPaM Logo
- Formation: 1989
- Type: Internal consulting organization
- Headquarters: Palo Alto, CA, USA

HP SPaM (HP Inc. Strategic Planning and Modeling) is an internal consulting group at HP Inc. that provides analytical support to HP business units on strategic and operational decisions. SPaM applies methods from operations research, statistics, artificial intelligence, machine learning, and management science to help HP business units address supply chain, operations, and pricing challenges, with the goal of improving revenue, cost, and customer satisfaction.

Established in 1989, SPaM has published work in business and academic journals, and its contribution have been associated with several awards received by HP.

== History ==
=== Founding ===
The HP SPaM team was established in 1989 by Corey Billington, who had recently joined HP and was working with Sara Beckman. Billington asked then-HP CEO Lew Platt for $100,000 to start a team focusing on efficiency and inventory within HP. Soon after, Corey Billington added Tom Davis, Paul Gibson, Steve Rockhold, Rob Hall, Marguerita Sasser, and Ed Feitzinger to the team and began a collaboration with Hau Lee, then a professor at Stanford, and M. Eric Johnson, then an HP employee.

=== Name ===
The name SPaM came from HP internal location code "LOCXXXX STRAT PLAN MODEL", assigned to the group when identification fields were limited. The abbreviations SPM and SM were initially considered based on this code, but the group settled on SPaM because it was easier to pronounce. This was before the Internet era, when "spam" was not yet synonymous with unsolicited or undesired bulk messages.

=== Logo ===
The triangles in SPaM logo represent inventory – the largest asset on the balance sheets of most consumer electronics manufacturers and the largest asset of HP. The blue bell shape represents uncertainty (including bell-shaped normal distribution) which exists in many decision-making situations. The combination of the shapes aims to represent SPaM's intention of using analytics to enable decision-making under uncertainty to improve asset management performance.

== Organization ==
=== Engagement Model and Practice Areas ===
SPaM uses a consulting engagement model in which HP businesses engage the group for individual projects. Key practice areas include:

- Supply Chain Strategy and Design
- Inventory Management and Forecasting
- Operations Tools and Processes
- Product Design and Variety Management
- Procurement and Manufacturing Processes
- Pricing Analytics

=== Notable Examples ===
SPaM has contributed to the development of end-to-end supply chain practices. Its work has supported improvements in manufacturing, distribution, procurement, product design, forecasting, metrics, and inventory control efficiencies. Some of the methods developed through this work were later published and adopted outside HP. Notable examples include:

- Popularizing and helping to drive the adoption of postponement in high-tech products, as a gain in efficiency in building responsive supply chains that support a high variety of product versions (SKUs or stock keeping units) and configurations
- Developing and popularizing the concept of using a single metric to measure the full end-to-end costs associated with carrying inventory, to support better supply chain decisions.
- The use of simple, practical spreadsheet tools to deploy the power of advanced statistical inventory target setting to a broad range of businesses.
- Popularizing the concept of product design for supply chain; leading product development teams to minimize end-to-end costs for design, production, distribution, and support instead of focusing solely on minimizing material costs and development schedules as was previously common practice.

=== Locations ===
SPaM supports HP businesses through team members located across multiple HP offices, including Houston, Texas; Palo Alto, California; Vancouver, Washington; Corvallis, Oregon; Grenoble, France; Böblingen Germany; and Singapore.

=== Members ===
SPaM members are Data Science and Process Engineering consultants who share strong interests in addressing business decisions from analytical, data-driven, and process perspectives. Typical members possess domain expertise as well as consulting and project management experiences from management consulting firms, or companies in their respective industries. Most have Master’s, Doctoral, and/or MBA degrees in technical fields such as industrial engineering, operations research, computer science, management science, mathematics, and statistics. Some SPaM are also recognized in academic and industry communities.

=== Directors ===
The following people have served as directors of SPaM:

- Corey Billington (1989–1996)
- Rob Hall (1996–2000)
- Gianpaolo Callioni (2000–2003)
- Scott Ellis (2003–2007)
- Thomas Olavson (2007 - 2011)
- Brian Cargille (2011 - 2013)
- Ray Ernenwein (2013 - 2015)
- Barrett Crane (2015 - 2025)
- Shabnam Zangeneh-Khamooshi (2025 - present)

== Awards ==
SPaM's work has been associated with several awards received by HP, including:

- In 2000, Wal-Mart named HP as its Supplier of the Year. HP's innovative supply-chain-management models, developed by SPaM, helped reduce the retailer's inventory-related stock-outs.
- In 2002, INFORMS gave HP an award for effective integration of Operations Research/Management Science (OR/MS) into organizational decision making, which it attributed to the partnership between SPaM and HP business divisions.
- In 2004, HP received Purchasing Magazine’s Company Medal of Professional Excellence. Product design for supply chain and procurement risk management - two innovations developed by SPaM - were cited as reasons for giving HP the award.
- In 2005, the Council of Supply Chain Management Professionals (CSCMP) recognized design for supply chain and procurement risk management - innovations developed by SPaM - as two of the Top 10 Supply Chain Innovations of the Year.
- In 2009, HP won the INFORMS Franz Edelman Award for its successful product variety management initiatives. The award recognizes outstanding examples of operations research-based projects that transform companies, entire industries, and people’s lives. The recognized innovations resulted from a collaborative effort between HP Labs and SPaM and saved HP more than $500 million between 2005 and 2008.

== Publications ==
SPaM members have published more than 50 articles on the applications of operations research and management science to support business decisions at HP. Many of these articles appeared in business journals such as Harvard Business Review and Sloan Management Review. SPaM members have served as editors of supply chain textbooks used in graduate school programs, and HP supply chain innovations developed by SPaM are cited in many supply chain textbooks. A former SPaM director, Brian Cargille, served on the Editorial Advisory Board of Supply Chain Management Review, an industry magazine. Techniques developed by SPaM members have been taught in MBA programs.

== See also ==
- Strategic planning
- Management
