= Rules of the garage =

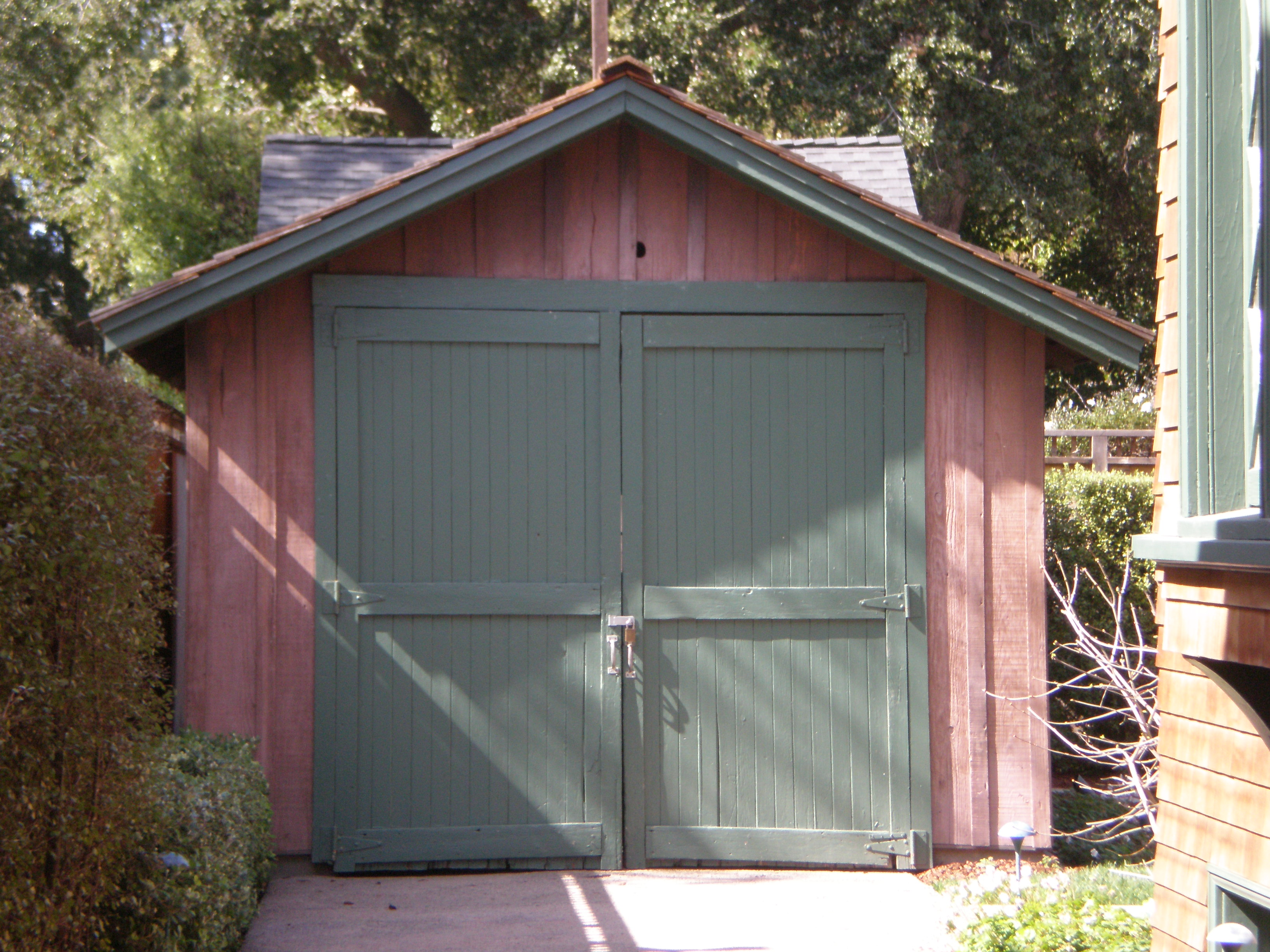
David Packard's garage in Palo Alto, in which Packard and Bill Hewlett first founded their company.

The rules of the garage are a set of eleven rules that Hewlett-Packard CEO Carly Fiorina used in 1999 to reinterpret the HP Way work ethos that Bill Hewlett and David Packard set when they founded Hewlett-Packard (HP). Fiorina felt that the traditional HP Way was too limiting in the modern corporate world, and that it needed to be updated. She authorized $200 million paid to Goodby, Silverstein & Partners for a corporate rebranding program which included the rewriting of the HP Way for a series of print ads.

== Background ==
The rewrite of the HP Way was first requested in November 1999 by newly appointed HP CEO Carly Fiorina, who hired Goodby, Silverstein & Partners to rebrand HP. The agency was to receive $200 million for the entire campaign, which included a new logo and "Invent" branding. Goodby executive Steven Simpson pored through Packard's 1995 book The HP Way, formulated an updated version of Packard's guideline, and submitted this to Fiorina, calling it the "Rules of the garage". HP responded with requested changes, removing Simpson's emphasis on engineering skill and high performance instrumentation. The modified rules were finalized to be used in a Hewlett-Packard print ad campaign. The name was a reference to David Packard's garage in Palo Alto, in which Packard and Bill Hewlett first founded the company after graduating from nearby Stanford University in 1935. The garage itself was intended to be the background for a television commercial featuring Fiorina, but its leaseholder, a florist company, did not agree to any filming proposals. Instead, a stage set appearing to be the historic garage was constructed on HP's property, including a rutted grass-and-dirt driveway leading up to it. This was used for the TV spots. Fiorina said on screen, "The company of Bill Hewlett and Dave Packard is being reinvented. The original startup will act like one again. Watch!"

== The eleven "Rules of the Garage" ==
The eleven rules are:

1. Believe you can change the world.
2. Work quickly, keep the tools unlocked, work whenever.
3. Know when to work alone and when to work together.
4. Share — tools, ideas. Trust your colleagues.
5. No Politics. No bureaucracy. (These are ridiculous in a garage.)
6. The customer defines a job well done.
7. Radical ideas are not bad ideas.
8. Invent different ways of working.
9. Make a contribution every day. If it doesn’t contribute, it doesn’t leave the garage.
10. Believe that together we can do anything.
11. Invent.
