= Gadola =

Gadola is a Swiss surname. Notable people with this surname include:

- Paul V. Gadola (1929–2014), American judge
- Renzo Gadola, Swiss banker involved in the UBS tax evasion controversies
- Robin Gadola (born 1994), Swiss squash player
