= St. Mary's Gardens =

Elderly housing facility in California

Coordinates: 37°48′18.81″N 122°16′52.28″W

St. Mary's Gardens is an Oakland, California elderly housing facility. The building was designed by Thomas J. Caulfield of Peters, Clayberg, and Caulfield. The design received a national Honor Award from the American Institute of Architects in 1981.
