= Brooklyn, Washburn County, Wisconsin =

Town in Wisconsin, United States

Brooklyn, Wisconsin
- Town
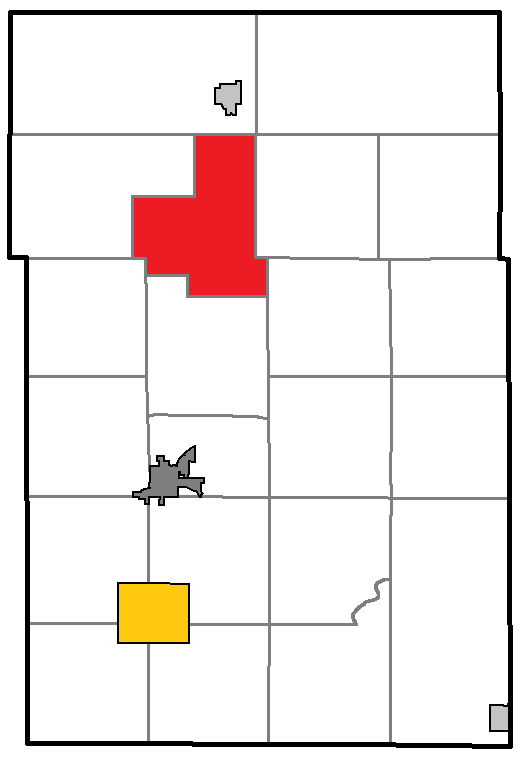
- Location of Brooklyn, within Washburn County, Wisconsin
- Coordinates: 46°0′30″N 91°51′11″W
- Country: United States
- State: Wisconsin
- County: Washburn

Area
  - Total: 36.3 sq mi (94.1 km^{2})
  - Land: 35.7 sq mi (92.5 km^{2})
  - Water: 0.62 sq mi (1.6 km^{2})
- Elevation: 1,066 ft (325 m)

Population (2020)
  - Total: 311
  - Density: 8.71/sq mi (3.36/km^{2})
- Time zone: UTC-6 (Central (CST))
  - Summer (DST): UTC-5 (CDT)
- Area codes: 715 & 534
- FIPS code: 55-10150
- GNIS feature ID: 1582872
- Website: https://www.brooklyntownwashburnwi.gov/

Brooklyn is a town in Washburn County, Wisconsin, United States. The population was 311 at the 2020 census. The unincorporated community of Lampson is located in the town.

== Geography ==
According to the United States Census Bureau, the town has a total area of 36.3 square miles (94.1 km^{2}), of which 35.7 square miles (92.5 km^{2}) is land and 0.6 square mile (1.6 km^{2}) (1.73%) is water.

== Demographics ==
As of the census of 2000, there were 281 people, 117 households, and 87 families residing in the town. The population density was 7.9 people per square mile (3.0/km^{2}). There were 227 housing units at an average density of 6.4 per square mile (2.5/km^{2}). The racial makeup of the town was 99.29% White, 0.36% Native American, and 0.36% from two or more races. Hispanic or Latino people of any race were 1.07% of the population.

There were 117 households, out of which 29.1% had children under the age of 18 living with them, 63.2% were married couples living together, 8.5% had a female householder with no husband present, and 24.8% were non-families. 19.7% of all households were made up of individuals, and 11.1% had someone living alone who was 65 years of age or older. The average household size was 2.40 and the average family size was 2.74.

In the town, the population was spread out, with 22.4% under the age of 18, 2.8% from 18 to 24, 28.8% from 25 to 44, 30.6% from 45 to 64, and 15.3% who were 65 years of age or older. The median age was 43 years. For every 100 females, there were 95.1 males. For every 100 females age 18 and over, there were 92.9 males.

The median income for a household in the town was $37,083, and the median income for a family was $41,563. Males had a median income of $31,071 versus $21,406 for females. The per capita income for the town was $19,165. About 5.1% of families and 9.0% of the population were below the poverty line, including 9.3% of those under the age of eighteen and 18.8% of those 65 or over.
