= Open door policy (business) =

Corporate communication policy

An open door policy (as related to the business and corporate fields) is a communication policy in which a manager leaves their office door "open" in order to encourage openness and transparency with the employees of that company. As the term implies, employees are encouraged to stop by whenever they feel the need to meet and ask questions, discuss suggestions, and address problems or concerns with management. An open door policy is typically intended to foster an environment of collaboration, high performance, and mutual respect between upper management and employees.

An open door policy means, literally, that every manager's door is open to every employee. The purpose of an open door policy is to encourage open communication, feedback, and discussion about any matter of importance to an employee.

== Benefits ==
Open door policies exist to encourage employees to offer suggestions and ideas, provide or solicit feedback, seek personal or professional counsel, or address concerns within the company. The policy establishes an environment of trust and mutual respect between the employer and employee. The practice is viewed as a morale booster by letting employees feel as if they are able to openly speak with their employer about issues face-to-face, rather than through e-mail or voicemail. In essence, an open door policy serves to empower employees, knowing that their voice is heard and issues are quickly addressed and resolved. Trust in the company tends to improve and grow, when employees understand that they are welcome to confide in senior management, when immediate supervisors are unavailable.

== Disadvantages ==
Open door policies tend to endorse the practice of bypassing the normal management structure, risking uninformed or suboptimal decisions that can also undermine line managers. While open door policies intend to encourage and instill a sense of transparency and openness, some employees hesitate to speak their mind or be honest, for fear of intimidation, criticism, and censure. Management personnel may tend to communicate the willingness to hear suggestions, while belittling the suggestions when unaccompanied by solutions.

Open door policies have also been seen as a way for companies to discourage the formation of labor unions. Formal, written policies may encourage openness, however, the response received in attempts to engage are often seen as threats to the authority or management style of the individual working in a supervisory or management capacity. The policy, in essence, allows employees to forgo meeting with their immediate supervisors, choosing rather to engage in communication with their senior managers to discuss their employment or personal issues.

A process of open communication and transparency allows employees to bypass their supervisors to engage with senior management. This may inadvertently lead to tension and strife between employees and middle management. Supervisors may either see this as an implication that they are the primary issue of concern, or they may feel threatened, suspecting the employee of undermining them in an attempt to cause problems between them and senior management.

== Other uses ==
Government officials at the local, state, and federal level often implement an open door policy for the purpose of meeting with constituents. In Salt Lake City, mayor Ralph Becker maintains an open door policy every Wednesday to meet with residents one-on-one to discuss issues, concerns, and suggestions involving the city. The Democratic Caucus of Orange County, New York has maintained an open door policy for over ten years, where all individuals, regardless of political affiliation are welcome to attend the meeting. In 2011, in an effort to introduce a more open and transparent government, Governor Andrew Cuomo of New York extended an open door policy to members of the public. A lottery was introduced that allowed for 300 New Yorkers to visit Gracie Mansion following the inaugural festivities. The following week, for the first time in the history of the State of New York, a lottery was held to open the State of the State Address to additional members of the public.

== See also ==
- The HP Way business philosophy
- Open Door Policy - US-China relations
