= The HP Way =

Business philosophy

The HP Way, also known as the Packard Way, or simply the Way by employees, was a progressive business philosophy implemented at Hewlett-Packard (HP) by its founders Bill Hewlett and David Packard from the 1940s through the early 2000s. It was a form of management by objectives, which emphasized teamwork, innovation, fiscal responsibility, and the obligation to improve society. It involved collaboration between management and the labor force and infused HP's corporate governance, and was a significant factor in HP's employee loyalty.

Bill Hewlett and David Packard were initially inspired by the Stanford University engineering professor Fred Terman. The HP Way first appeared formally in 1957 as a set of six written objectives for the company, with a seventh added in 1966.

The HP Way ended during 2001–2002 under the direction of CEO Carly Fiorina, who merged HP with Compaq and fired thousands of HP employees instead of reassigning them.

The progressive philosophy of the HP Way influenced the early Silicon Valley tech industry and corporate culture. Notably, Agilent Technologies, a laboratory instrumentation company spun off from HP in 1999, retained the HP Way concept even after it was abandoned at HP.

== Background ==
David Packard and Bill Hewlett first met as engineering students at Stanford University in the early 1930s. They were inspired by Professor Fred Terman teachings, emphasizing collaboration and cooperation. When they founded HP, they applied Terman's teachings, thereby influencing companies like Intel, the emerging culture of Silicon Valley, and contributing to the region's development.

HP maintained its connection with Stanford and Terman. Stanford helped HP engineers gain advanced degrees and HP was the second tenant at Terman's Stanford Industrial Park, a collaborative engineering project at the heart of Silicon Valley. Terman recalled in 1973 that the company founders were "ahead of their time" in focusing on employee goals and rewards, and that this was "one of the reasons for the success of HP."

Corporate management author James C. Collins described the HP Way as "visionary" for its time. In the 1940s, it was not common for a company to care for its employees, customers or society, as was illustrated by Stanford business management professor Paul Eugene Holden, who asserted at a conference in 1942 that a corporation should be concerned only about its shareholders. Packard, who was in attendance, stood up and said: "I think you’re absolutely wrong. Management has a responsibility to its employees, it has a responsibility to its customers, it has a responsibility to the community at large." Packard recalled later that his peers "almost laughed me out of the room." He said, "I was surprised and shocked that not a single person at that meeting agreed with me. While they were reasonably polite in their disagreement, it was quite evident they firmly believed I was not one of them, and obviously not qualified to manage an important enterprise."

== Components ==
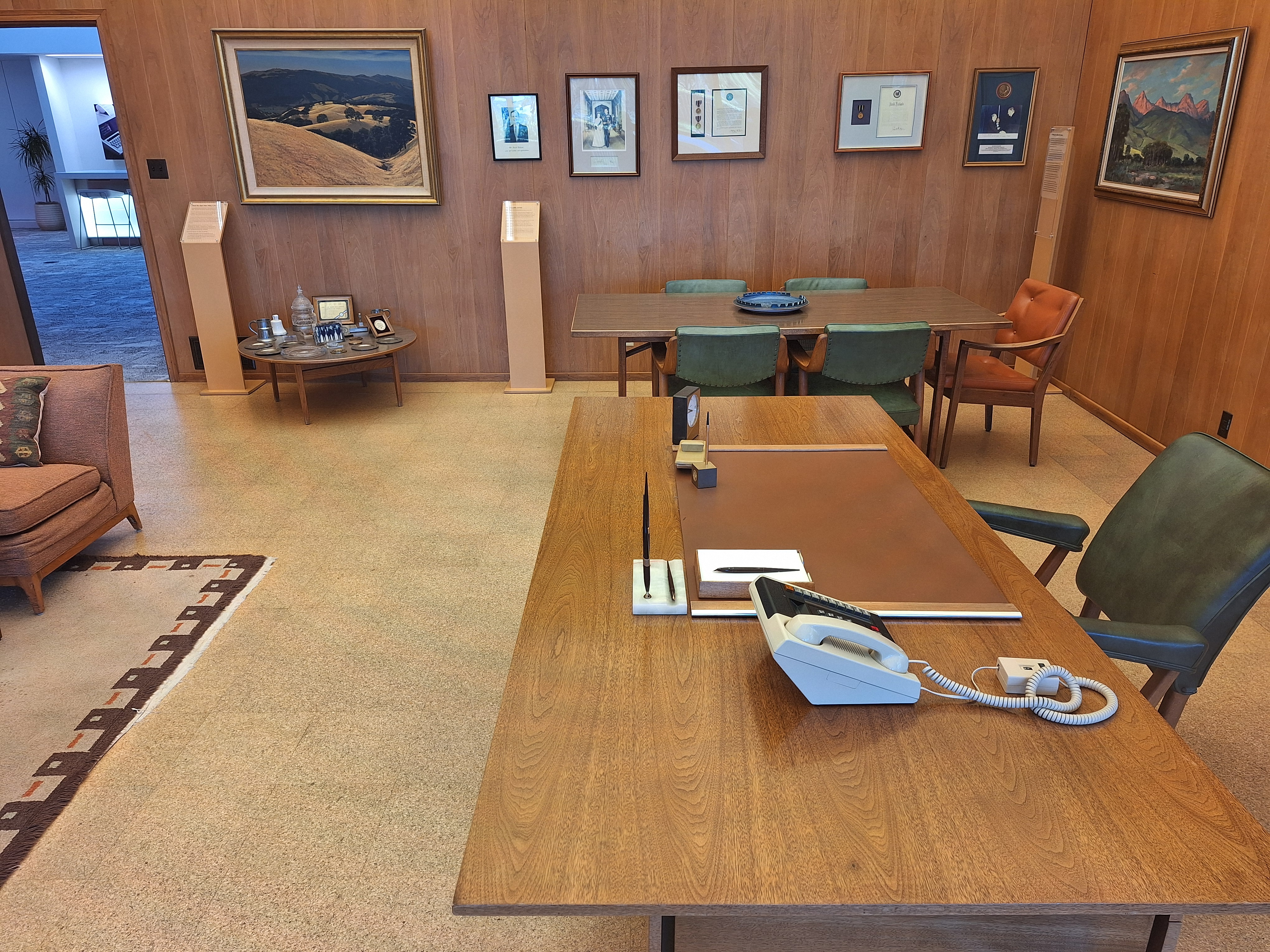
David Packard's office

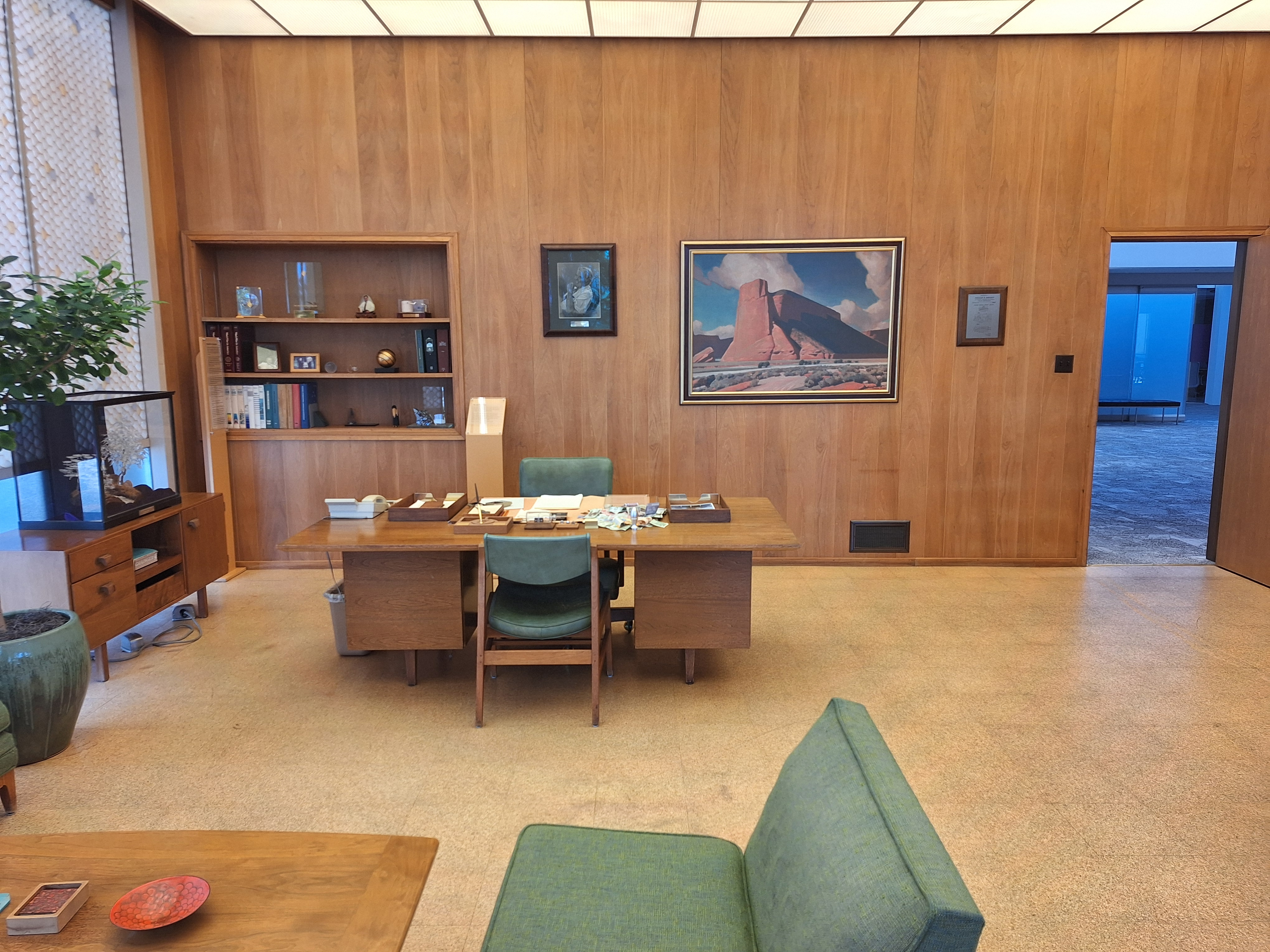
Bill Hewlett's office

Preserved HP offices in Palo Alto, California

In July 1977, HP published The HP Way, which described the company's seven objectives:

- Profit: "To achieve sufficient profit to finance our company growth and to provide the resources we need to achieve our other corporate objectives."
- Customers: "To provide products and services of the greatest possible value to our customers, thereby gaining and holding their respect and loyalty."
- Fields of Interest: "To enter new fields only when the ideas we have, together with our technical, manufacturing and marketing skills, assure that we can make a needed and profitable contribution to the field."
- Growth: "To let our growth be limited only by our profits and our ability to develop and produce technical products that satisfy real customer needs."
- Our People: "To help our own people share in the company’s success, which they made possible: to provide job security based on their performance, to recognize their individual achievements, and to help them gain a sense of satisfaction and accomplishment from their work."
- Management: "To foster initiative and creativity by allowing the individual great freedom of action in attaining well-defined objectives."
- Citizenship: "To honor our obligations to society by being an economic, intellectual and social asset to each nation and each community in which we operate."

Collins wrote that "Most entrepreneurs pursue the question 'How can I succeed?' From day one, Packard and Hewlett pursued a different question: 'What can we contribute?' and thereby HP attained extraordinary success." They used profits to invest further in the company rather than to pay high salaries to executives. All employees had ownership stakes in the company, which made HP the first large corporation to establish profit-sharing for all workers.

In 1995, David Packard published a book titled The HP Way: How Bill Hewlett and I Built Our Company, describing how the concept worked in practice. Packard explained that the HP Way was a clear case of management by objectives, in which employees were given a set of goals without restricting their method of obtaining results. Packard said that the HP Way directed the company leadership to interact frequently with the workers in the workplace. Packard called it "management by wandering around", as it involved many casual, unplanned visits with employees. Additionally, the company managers were encouraged to maintain an open door policy to enable employees to bring their concerns or suggestions directly to their manager. San Francisco Chronicle reporter Mark Simon relayed the observation of Packard's book editor, HP public relations head Dave Kirby, who described HP in the 1960s: "It was a collegial atmosphere and you could see it when you visited the company's facilities—employees stood in the cafeteria line with top executives, shirt-sleeved managers stood around coffee carts and chatted with employees. It was management by collaboration..."

In 1970, the HP Way was put to the test when orders dropped below production capacity. HP mitigated the damage by reducing everyone's schedule and pay by ten percent: the usual ten days of work during a two-week period was shortened to nine days, described as the "nine-day fortnight". Executives, managers and workers all joined in this reduction for six months until orders rose again in 1971. This resulted in overall labor costs being reduced by approximately ten percent, without having to lay off ten percent of the workforce.

Packard wrote that a company should not be focused solely on profit; instead, profit is necessary because it allows the company to meet its other objectives. Under the leadership of Hewlett and Packard, HP reinvested much of its profit to finance its own growth. They refrained from borrowing capital despite the attraction of short-term gains.

After Packard died, Hewlett characterized the HP Way as Packard's greatest legacy. However, based on company papers, HP archivist Karen Lewis said that the HP Way was initially Hewlett's idea.

== Disadvantages ==
The HP Way was criticized in the late 1990s for enabling a sprawling bureaucracy in which competing business units developed contradictory programs in parallel; the company was unable to choose which one would go forward. For example, a comprehensive internet browser was invented in 1993 by HP engineer Ira Goldstein, but executives were unable to see the future importance of browser technology, and the program was canceled. Filling the vacuum, Netscape seized the majority of browser market share in 1994–1995. At the time, HP projects required the approval of various committees, greatly reducing business agility. In one case, 37 committee approvals were needed for a single operational change requested by division manager Jeffrey L. Cooke, who eventually left HP because of excessive bureaucracy.

== Decline ==
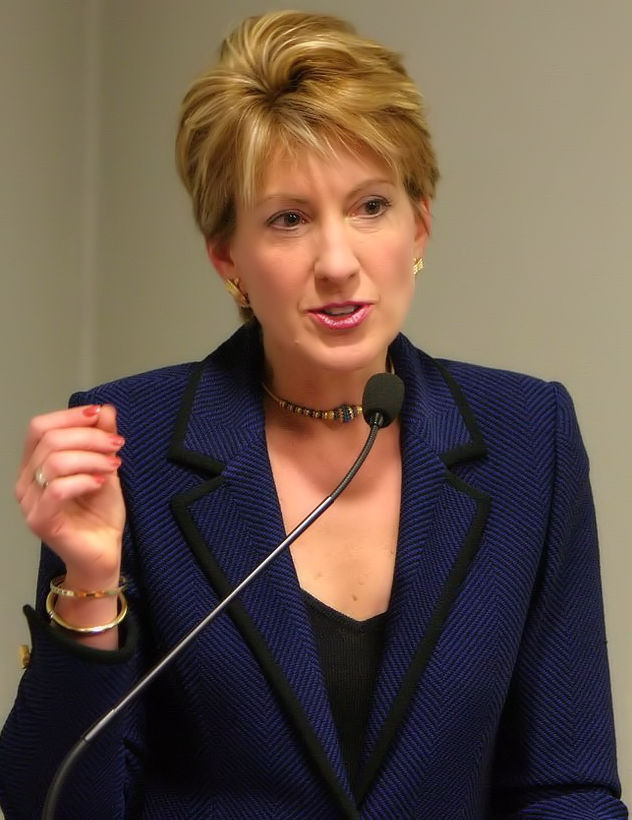
Carly Fiorina worked against the HP Way during her time as CEO from 1999 to 2005.

The company founders, Hewlett and Packard, stepped back from direct management of the company in the 1980s. Their successors, including CEO Lewis E. Platt, would keep their own interpretation of the HP Way tradition, instead of seeking fast profits from the internet boom. Although HP was very successful with its HP DeskJet printers throughout the 1990s, it lost computer market share to Dell and IBM.

In 1999, Platt was succeeded by Carly Fiorina. As CEO of HP, Fiorina "paid lip service to the HP Way", according to the Los Angeles Times. She did not practice management by wandering around, nor did she maintain an open door policy. Under Fiorina, HP modernized its corporate policies and imported the profit-seeking style of Lucent Technologies, Fiorina's previous company. She wrote her own version of the HP Way titled "Rules of the garage". While implementing her goals, Fiorina was regularly met with opposition from the HP board, especially the Hewlett and Packard families.

In September 2001, Fiorina announced that HP would purchase Compaq for $25 billion, with the media calling it a "mega-merger". MarketWatch writer Mike Tarsala wrote that this was the death of the HP Way. Other observers point to the 2002 firing of 15,000 HP employees as the end of the HP Way. Under the HP Way, these workers would have been offered training and new roles.

Several observers have written that Agilent Technologies, which was spun off from HP in 1999, should have kept the HP name along with the legacy HP products and the HP Way philosophy. HP engineer Chuck House wrote that "many alumni" hold this view.

== See also ==
- Don't be evil – a corporate motto used by Google
