= Thomas J. Caulfield =

American architect

Thomas J. Caulfield (December 23, 1939 – October 4, 2007) was an American architect. Caulfield's work has won numerous national and regional design awards.

== Biography ==
=== Early life ===
Thomas James Caulfield was born to Madeleine "Sue" Caulfield (née Joyner) and Thomas Caulfield in Redding, California. Caulfield trained in architecture at the University of California, Berkeley.

=== Career ===
He worked abroad as an architect in the United Kingdom, Italy, and Libya before returning to the United States. He worked as a partner at Muller & Caulfield Architects, Caulfield Architects, and Peters, Clayberg & Caulfield.

He completed the design of the Flora Lamson Hewlett Library of the Graduate Theological Union in Berkeley, California after the death of world-renowned architect Louis Kahn. The project received an American Library Association/AIA Honor Award, in addition to a number of regional design awards. He also designed the St. Mary's Gardens elderly housing project in Oakland, California. That project received an American Institute of Architects National Honor Award in 1981 .

He also oversaw the renovation of a number of historically significant buildings, such as the Stewart Residence in San Francisco, the former First Unitarian Church on the campus of the University of California, Berkeley, and three buildings at the University of California, Davis.

He was a resident of Berkeley, California.
