= Amber D. Miller =

Physicist and university leader

Amber Dawn Miller is an American experimental cosmologist. Since September 2024, she has been the president of the Hewlett Foundation. At the University of Southern California, she was a professor of physics and astronomy and the dean of the Dornsife College of Letters, Arts, and Sciences. She is an American Physical Society Fellow.

== Education ==
Miller received her B.A. in physics and astrophysics from the University of California, Berkeley in 1995 and her PhD in physics from Princeton University in 2000. As a postdoctoral scholar, she completed a NASA Hubble Fellowship at the University of Chicago.

== Research and career ==
Miller has published nearly 200 articles and journal entries related to the field of early universe cosmology, as well as a number of articles on atmospheric science. Her PhD thesis work provided some of the first observational evidence of the first peak in the power spectrum of the cosmic microwave background (CMB), from the Mobile Anisotropy Telescope experiment, suggesting that the geometry of the universe is flat.

In 2002, she was appointed to the faculty of Columbia University and served as the first dean of science for the University's faculty of arts and sciences from 2011–16.

Since September 2024, she has been the president of the Hewlett Foundation.

== Awards and honors ==
Miller's awards include a National Science Foundation CAREER Award, an Alfred P. Sloan Fellowship and a Lenfest Distinguished Faculty Award. She was elected as a Fellow of the American Physical Society in 2014 "for important contributions to observations of the cosmic microwave background and development of innovative instrumentation for millimeter-wave cosmology."
