= Hewlett Teaching Center =

Building at Stanford University, US

Coordinates: 37°25′45″N 122°10′22″W

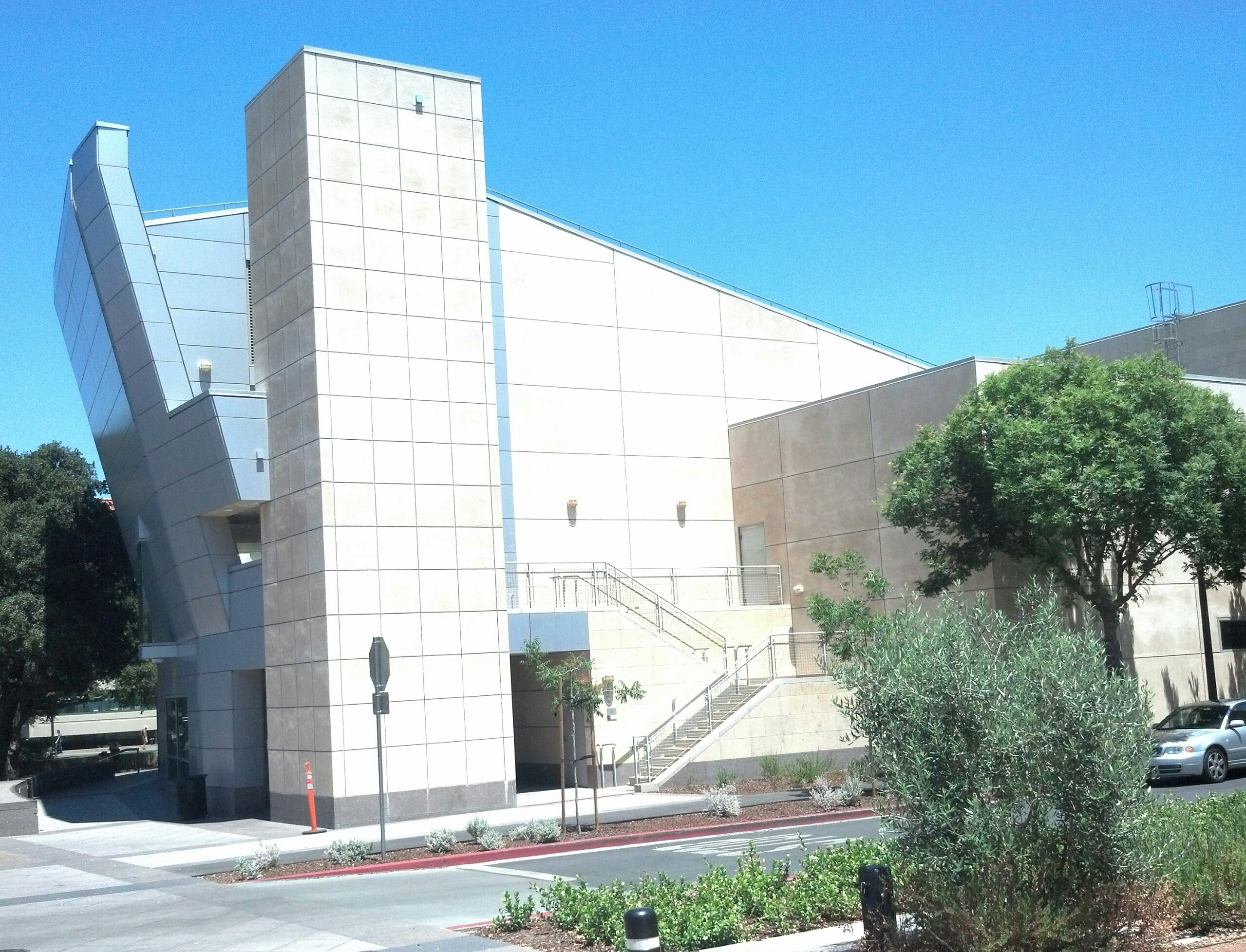
William R. Hewlett Teaching Center

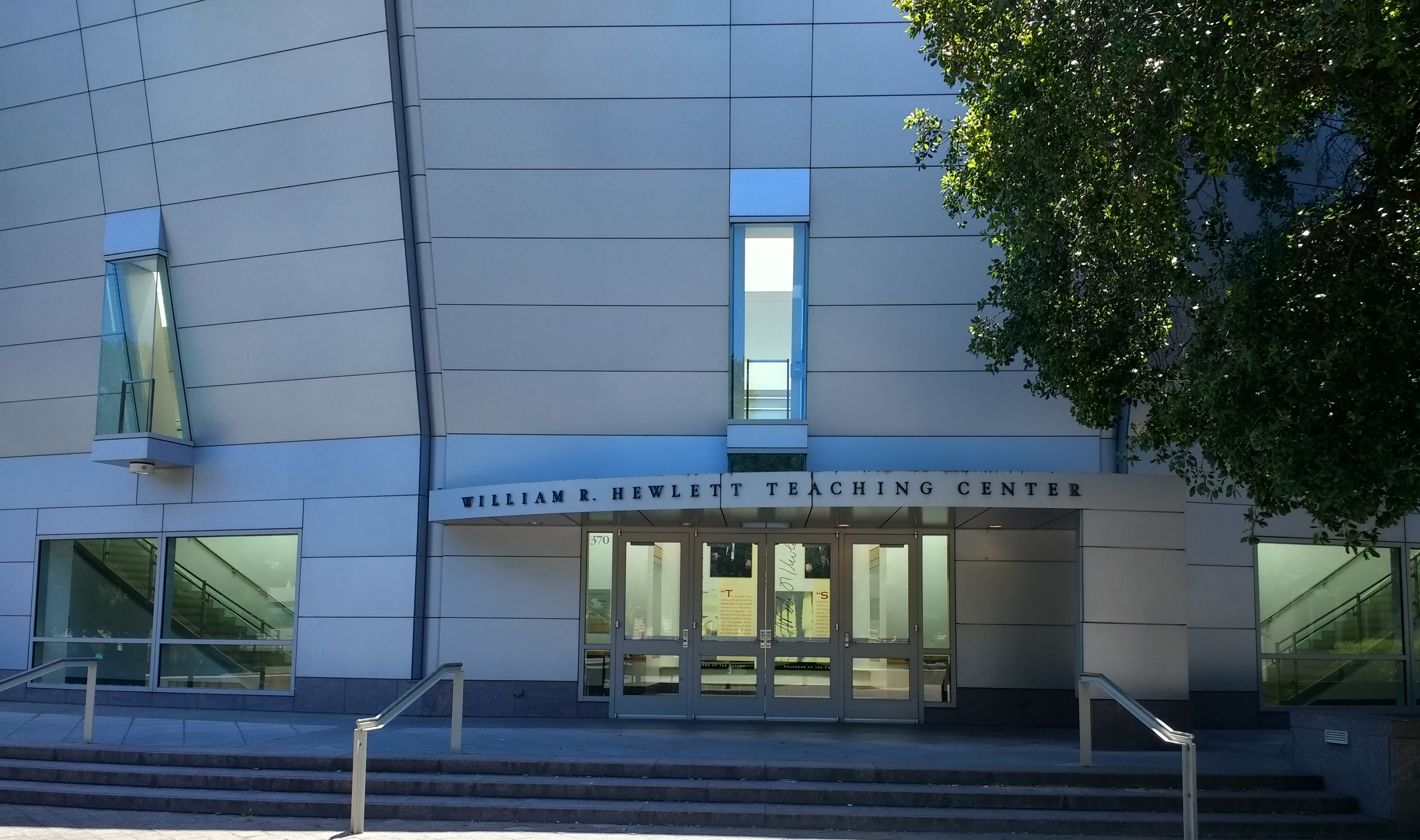
William R. Hewlett Teaching Center

The William R. Hewlett Teaching Center is a building at Stanford University in California, United States named for William R. Hewlett, co-founder of Hewlett-Packard.

Located west of the main quad, the Hewlett building was built by project architect James Ingo Freed and landscape architect Laurie Olin in 1999. Hewlett, along with the Packard Building, Sequoia Hall, and McCullough Annex (renamed Moore Materials Research), were all built as a part of a project to create a new Science and Engineering Quad. The building was formerly known as the Teaching Center at the Science and Engineering Quad (TCSEQ).

The project was funded primarily by Hewlett and David Packard, who donated $77.4 million in 1994. It houses two large auditoriums and teaching halls, often used for teaching introductory courses in the sciences or for lecture series.
