= Hewlett Foundation =

American grant-maker

The William and Flora Hewlett Foundation
- Founded: 1966
- Founder: William Redington Hewlett and Flora Lamson Hewlett
- Type: Private foundation
- Location: Menlo Park, California
- Region served: Worldwide
- Method: Endowment
- Board Chair: Mariano-Florentino Cuéllar
- Key people: Amber D. Miller (president)
- Revenue: $785 million (2024)
- Expenses: $755 million (2024)
- Endowment: $14.2 billion (2024)
- Website: www.hewlett.org

The William and Flora Hewlett Foundation, commonly known as the Hewlett Foundation, is an American private foundation based in Menlo Park, California. It was established by Hewlett-Packard cofounder William Redington Hewlett and his wife Flora Lamson Hewlett in 1966. The Hewlett Foundation awards grants to a variety of liberal and progressive causes.

With assets of approximately US$14 billion, Hewlett is one of the wealthiest grant makers in the United States. The foundation has grantmaking programs in education, the environment, global development and population, the performing arts, and philanthropy.

== History ==
Bill and Flora Hewlett consolidated their philanthropic activity into the William R. Hewlett Foundation, which Bill, aged 53, founded in 1966 in their Palo Alto, California, home. Founding board members were Bill, Flora, and the couple's oldest son, Walter Hewlett. The years 1966–1972 were referred to as "the living room years". Flora Hewlett served as a board member and Bill Hewlett was an active part of the foundation until his death. Bill Hewlett sought to fund established organizations operating in his fields of interest. In its first ten years, the foundation awarded close to $15.3 million to organizations involved in education, population, performing arts, environment, health, and social services.

In 1972, the foundation's board of directors was expanded with the addition of William A. Hewlett and James S. Hewlett. In 1974, the foundation hired its first executive director, John May, who was also the executive of the San Francisco Foundation. Following Flora Hewlett's death in 1977, and in her memory, the foundation's name was changed to "The William and Flora Hewlett Foundation". Shortly after, the foundation appointed former University of California Chancellor Roger W. Heyns as president, with Bill Hewlett becoming the board chair. The board was expanded with the addition of Eleanor Hewlett Gilmon and Mary Hewlett Jaffe, daughters of Bill and Flora. Since 1981, the majority of the foundation's board has been composed of non-family members.

The foundation has made grants in the areas of conflict resolution, education, environmental protection, performing arts, and as a supporter of organizations in the Bay Area.

In 1993, with the appointment of former University of California President David P. Gardner, who succeeded Roger Heyns who retired after 15 years, the foundation's focus widened. The foundation expanded its funding of environmental causes, formerly restricted to California, to all over the Western United States and Canada. The foundation also began focusing on K-12 education reforms. Gardner introduced a new program supporting relations between the US and Latin America. Gardner served for six years.

During Gardner's tenure, the foundation introduced the limitation of terms served as program officers with terms expiring after six years, followed by an extension of three years with board approval. In 2005, this term limit was extended to eight years.

In 1997, Condoleezza Rice joined the Hewlett Foundation's board of directors.

In January 2000, Paul Brest, the former dean of Stanford Law School, was appointed as the new president of the foundation. He served for 12 years. On January 12, 2001, Bill Hewlett, aged 87 years, died from heart failure. During Brest's time as president, the foundation started to focus on awarding grants for efforts curbing global warming and the expansion of the use of open educational resources. During this time, the foundation also relocated to Menlo Park, California.

In 2003, previous to serving as United States Secretary of Energy, American physicist Steven Chu served on the Hewlett Foundation's board of directors.

Larry Kramer, also a former dean of Stanford Law School, became the foundation's president in 2012. He introduced new initiatives addressing political polarization as well as cybersecurity. Kramer stepped down in December 2023.

Stephen C. Neal, who had been serving as a board member since 2006, was appointed as and succeeded Walter Hewlett as board chair.

Neal was succeeded as board chair in 2021 by former California Supreme Court justice Mariano-Florentino Cuéllar.

In June 2024, Amber D. Miller, an American experimental cosmologist and former dean of the USC Dana and David Dornsife College of Letters, Arts and Sciences, became president of the Hewlett Foundation.

=== Foundation assets and endowment ===
During its first ten years, the foundation awarded grants of approximately $15.3 million.

The foundation's endowment kept growing considerably, with Flora Hewlett's estate bolstering it to more than $300 million in 1981 and the foundation's assets reaching more than $800 million by the 1990s, an increase of more than 30 times.

Between 1993 and 1999, under the leadership of David P. Gardner, the foundation's assets grew to more than $2 billion and grants increased from $35 million in 1993 to $84 million in 1998.

In 2000, the foundation's assets had grown to $3.93 billion. This increased further with the transfer of Bill Hewlett's estate bringing the assets up to $8.52 billion and catapulting the foundation into the fifth place of private foundations in America.

According to the OECD, the Hewlett Foundation provided USD 123.3 million for development in 2019, all in the form of grants.

== Programs and grants ==
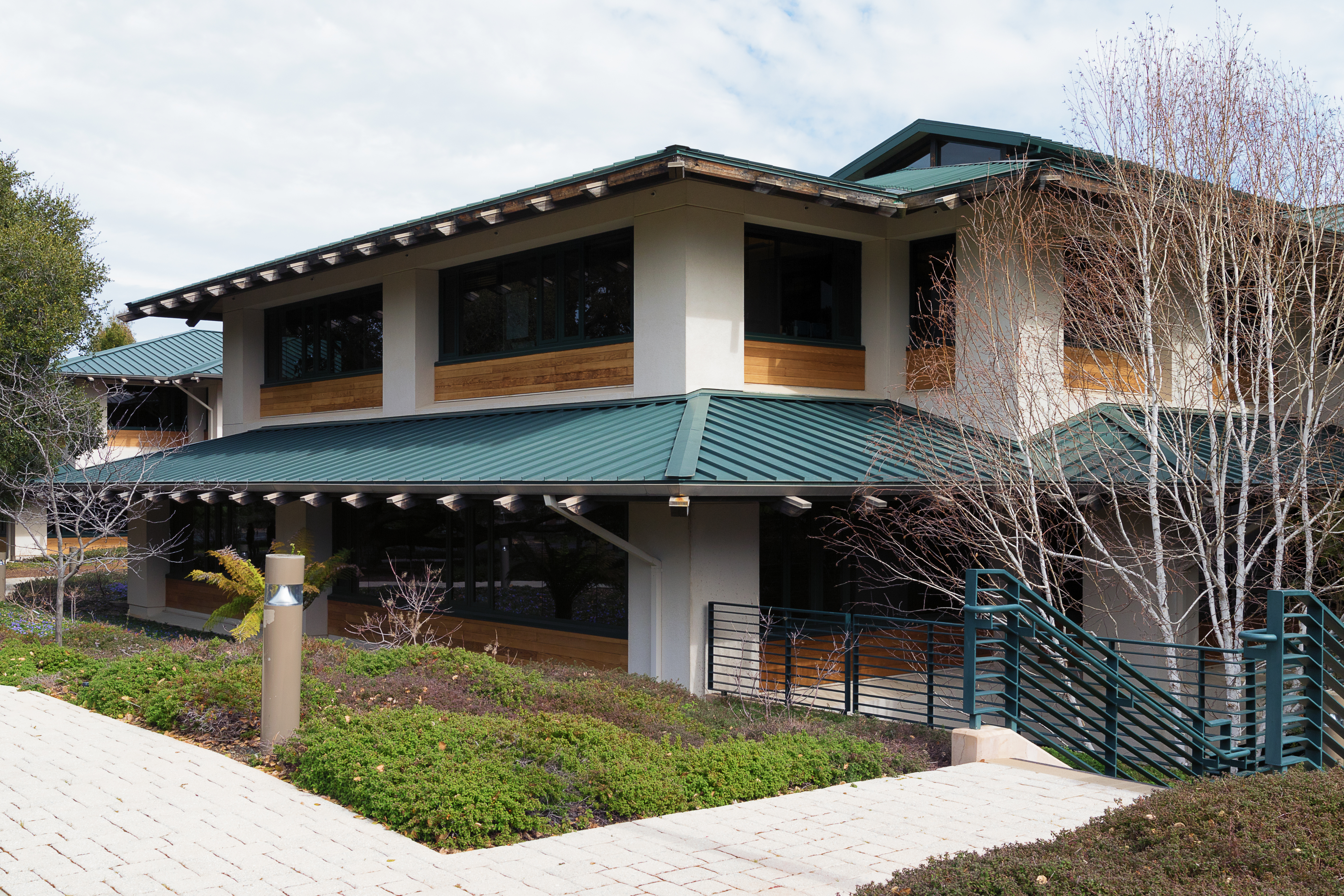
The Hewlett Foundation's office building in Menlo Park

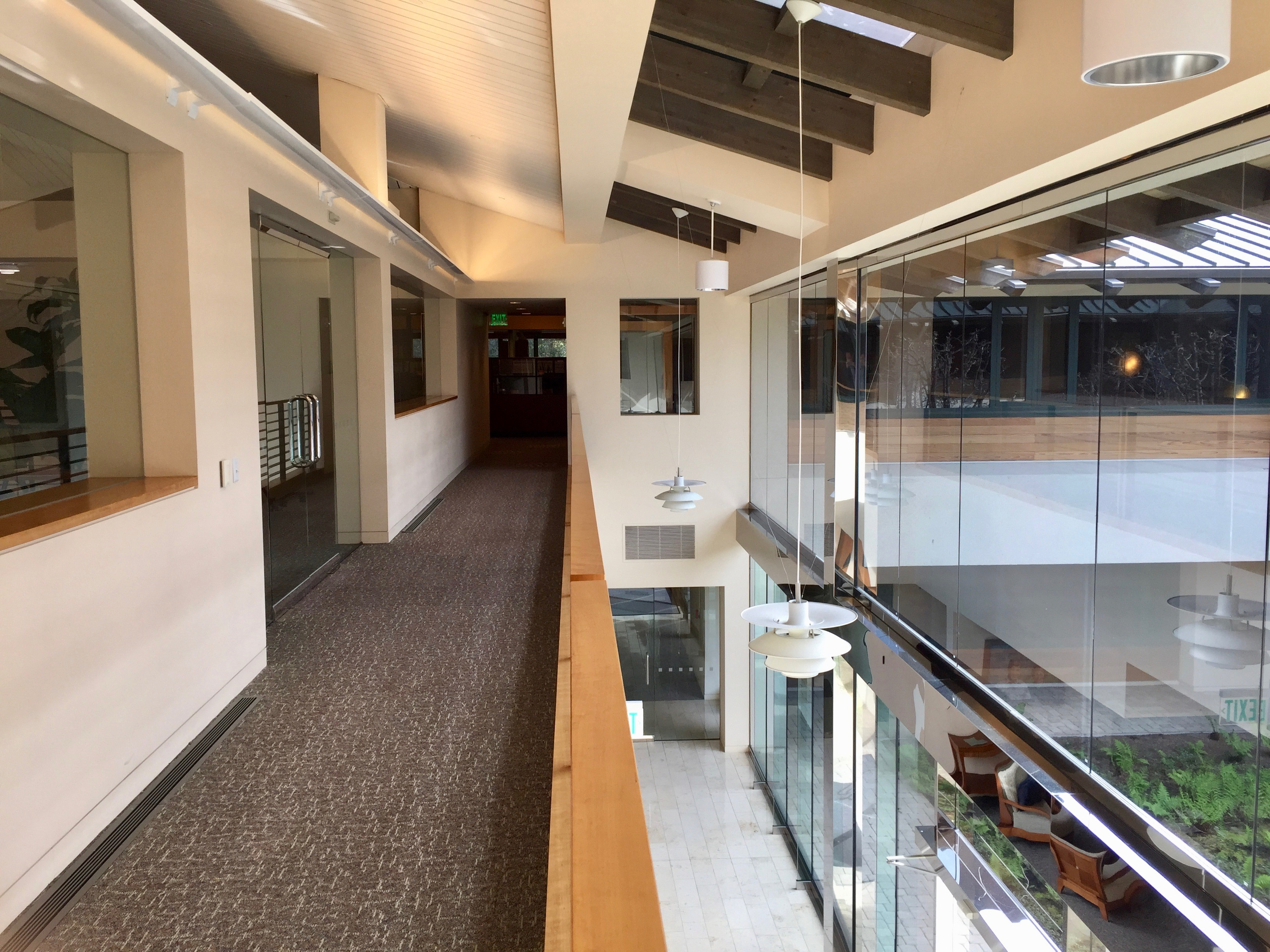
Interior of the Hewlett Foundation's headquarters

=== Economic policy ===
In 2019, the foundation pledged millions of dollars to take on Big Tech companies like Facebook and Amazon, "put[ing] a slice of its money toward organizations re-examining the free market economic policies that dominate Washington." The New York Times wrote that the Hewlett Foundation, along with groups run by George Soros and Pierre Omidyar, "regularly fund critical looks at capitalism." In 2020, the Hewlett Foundation gave $50 million to efforts designed to "replace neoliberalism." In 2022, the Hewlett Foundation and the Omidyar Network pledged over $40 million to "reimagine capitalism".

=== Education ===
In 2001, the foundation gave $400 million to Stanford University for humanities, sciences, and undergraduate education. At the time, the gift was the largest on record to a university. In 2007, the Hewlett Foundation made a $113 million donation to the University of California, Berkeley to create 100 new endowed professorships and provide financial help for graduate students.

In May 2010, the Hewlett Foundation announced its strategy of "Deeper Learning", which is a set of student educational outcomes including acquisition of robust core academic content, higher-order thinking skills, and learning dispositions.

Hewlett and the Andrew W. Mellon Foundation helped to develop the field of OpenCourseWare. Hewlett seeded the Creative Commons project with $1 million.

=== Climate ===
In 2008, the foundation awarded the ClimateWorks Foundation approximately $460,800,000. Hewlett funded restoration of the Bay Area Salt Ponds and conservation of the Great Bear Rainforest in Canada.

Hewlett's Environment Program makes grants to support conservation in the North American West, reduce global warming and conventional pollution resulting from the use of fossil fuels, and promote environmental protection efforts in California. The Hewlett Foundation opposes coal and natural gas development.

=== Journalism ===
The Hewlett Foundation has provided financial support for news organizations like The Atlantic, California Watch, Christianity Today, the Institute for Nonprofit News, Military Veterans in Journalism, National Public Radio, PBS News Hour, and Religion News Service. Hewlett has also funded efforts to counter fake news and online misinformation.

=== Abortion ===
The Hewlett Foundation is a major donor to groups working to increase legal abortion access. The foundation funds abortion care. The Hewlett Foundation has given major financial support to Planned Parenthood and the International Planned Parenthood Federation.

== Board of directors ==
As of 2025, the foundation's board of directors includes:

- Mariano-Florentino Cuéllar, chairman
- Amber D. Miller, president
- Melody Barnes
- Flora Hewlett Birdzell
- Alecia Ann DeCourdreaux
- Benno Dorer
- Persis Drell
- Billy Hewlett
- Mary Ellen Iskenderian
- Sarah Jaffe
- Sue Lloyd
- Susan Meaney
- Carrie Hewlett Zeisler

== See also ==
- List of wealthiest charitable foundations
- Nonprofit Marketplace Initiative
- David and Lucile Packard Foundation, endowed by another Hewlett-Packard cofounder
