= Flora Hewlett =

American philanthropist

- Born: Flora Lamson; August 14, 1914; Berkeley, California, US
- Died: February 9, 1977 (aged 62); San Jose, California, US
- Education: University of California, Berkeley (BS)
- Occupation: Philanthropist
- Spouse: Bill Hewlett (m. 1939)
- Children: 5

Flora Lamson Hewlett (August 14, 1914 – February 9, 1977) was an American billionaire philanthropist.

== Early life ==
Flora Lamson was born in 1914 and raised in Berkeley, California, and she summered in the Sierra Nevada. It was then that she met and became friends with Louise Hewlett, her future husband's sister, as both families had cabins in the Sierra. She received a Bachelor of Science in Biochemistry from the University of California, Berkeley, in 1935. After graduation, she joined the Sierra Club and reconnected with her friend Louise, who reintroduced her to her future husband, Bill Hewlett, the co-founder of Hewlett-Packard.

== Philanthropy ==
In 1966, she co-founded the William and Flora Hewlett Foundation with her husband. She sat on the Board of Trustees of Stanford University in Palo Alto, California, and the San Francisco Theological Seminary, a Presbyterian seminary in San Anselmo, California. She also served on the executive committee of the World Affairs Council of Northern California and on the Board of Directors of California Tomorrow, an environmental non-profit organization.

The Flora Lamson Hewlett Library, a collection of theological books serving the Graduate Theological Union in Berkeley, California, is named in her honor. The Flora Family Foundation, created by her children, is also named in her honor. Its symbol is the blue gentiana, her favorite flower.

== Personal life ==
In 1939, she married Bill Hewlett, the co-founder of Hewlett-Packard. They had five children and twelve grandchildren. She was an elder of the First Presbyterian Church in Palo Alto. She died of cancer on February 9, 1977.
