= Lampson, Wisconsin =

- Unincorporated community
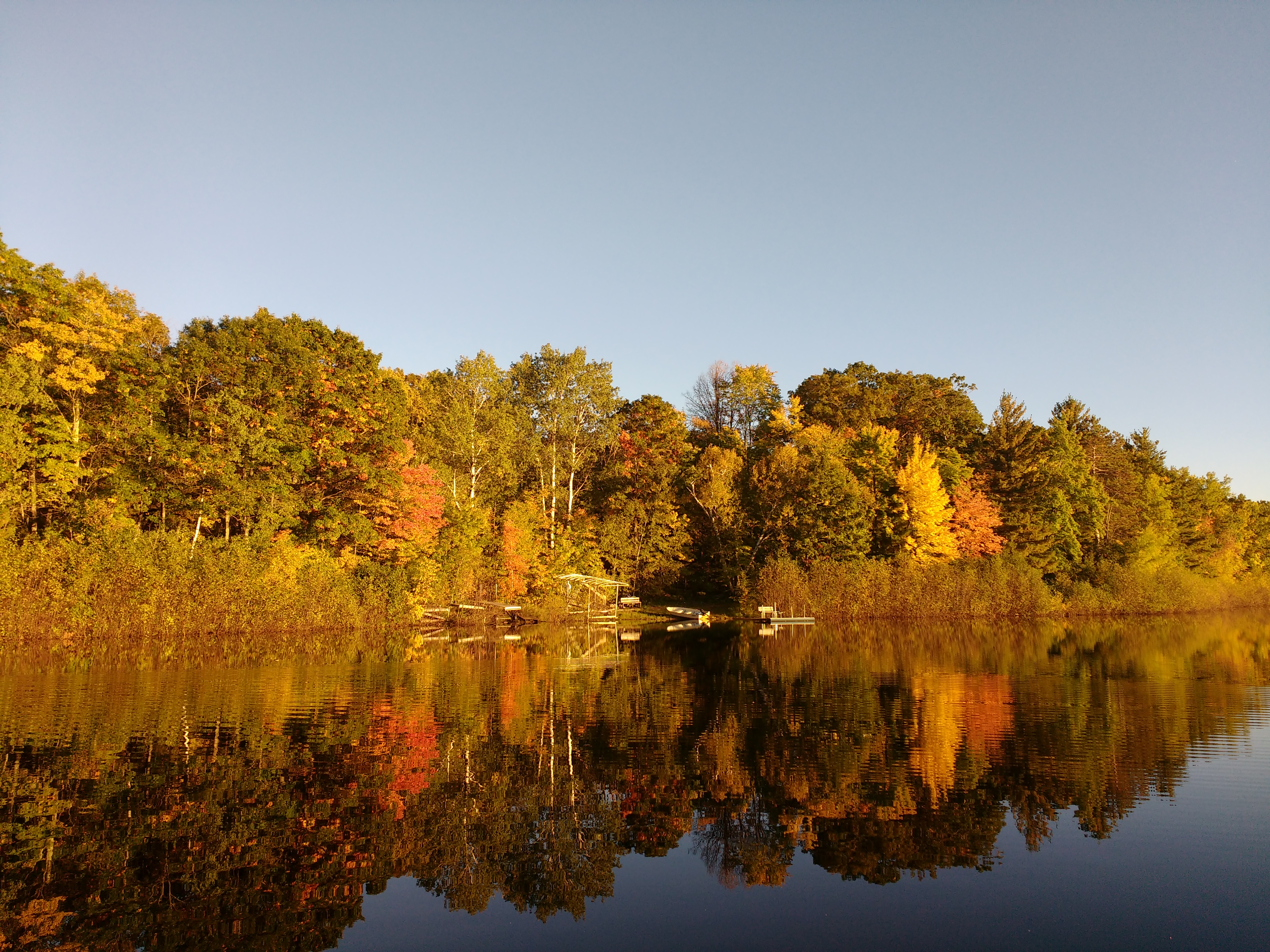
- Silver Lake, Lampson WI

- Location within Wisconsin Location within the United States
- Coordinates: 45°58′59″N 91°48′59″W
- Country: United States
- State: Wisconsin
- County: Washburn
- Elevation: 1,178 ft (359 m)
- Time zone: UTC-6 (Central (CST))
  - Summer (DST): UTC-5 (CDT)
- Area codes: 715 and 534
- GNIS feature ID: 1567822

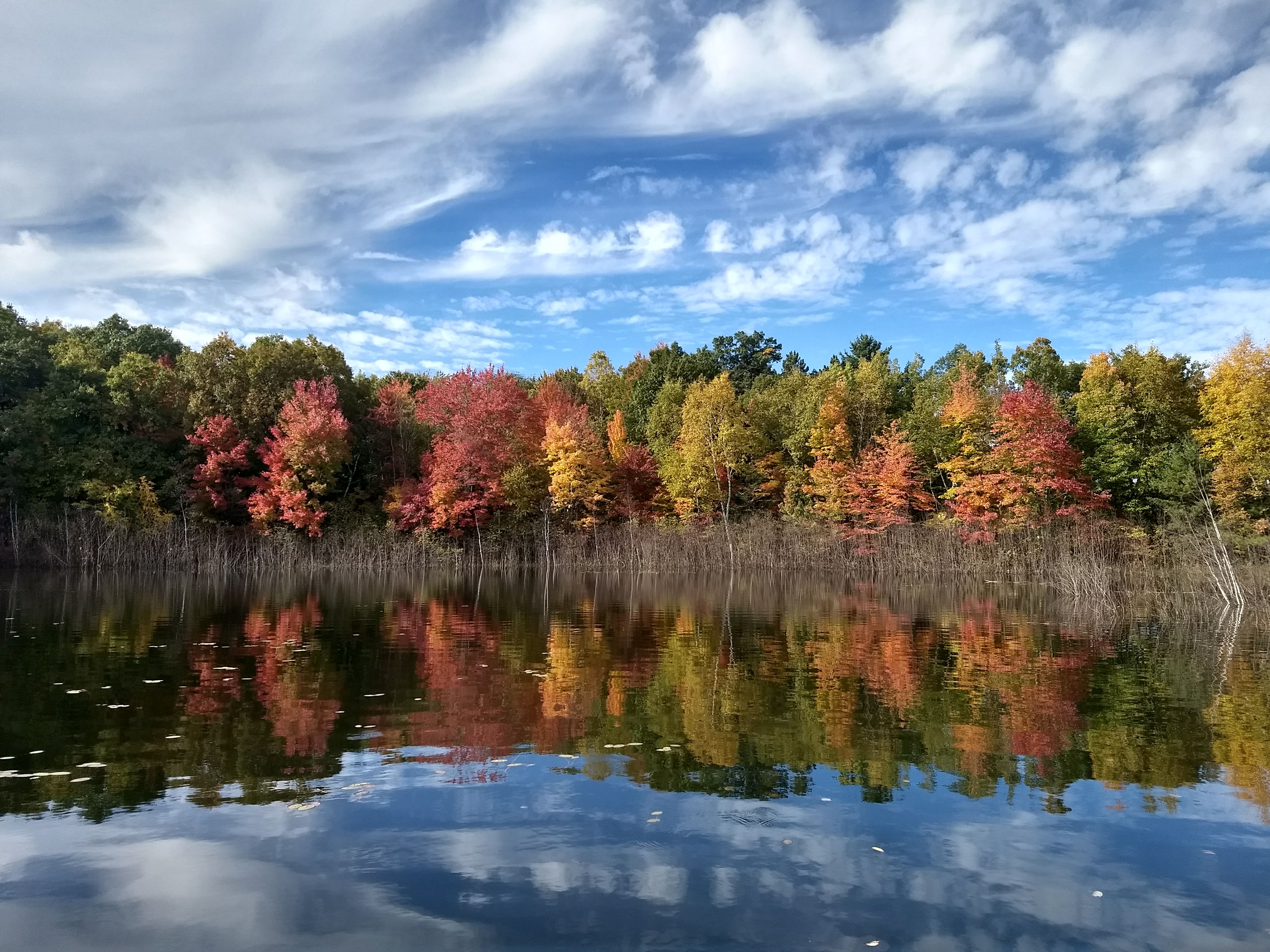
Silver Lake Lampson in Fall

Lampson is an unincorporated community located in the town of Brooklyn, Washburn County, Wisconsin, United States.

== History ==
A post office called Lampson was established in 1902, and remained in operation until it was discontinued in 1959. The community was named for J. T. and F. L. Lampson, who kept a general store there. Lampson is home to 188 acre Silver Lake. Silver lake has a maximum depth of 28 feet. Visitors have access to the lake from a public boat landing. Fish include Panfish, Largemouth Bass, Northern Pike and Walleye. The lake's water is moderately clear.
