= Lewis E. Platt =

American businessman and CEO of Hewlett-Packard

- Platt in 2004
- Born: April 11, 1941; Johnson City, New York, U.S.
- Died: September 8, 2005 (aged 64)
- Other name: Lew Platt
- Education: 1964 BME, Cornell University; 1966 MBA, Wharton School
- Occupations: engineer; business executive
- Board member of: Hewlett-Packard; Kendal-Jackson Wine Estates Ltd; Boeing Company; David and Lucile Packard Foundation; SETI Institute; Wharton School Board of Overseers; Joint Venture: SIlicon Valley Network; 7-Eleven June 2001–April 2005; Alpha Tau Omega National Foundation
- Spouses: Susan (c:a 1965-1981, her death); Joan Ellen (1983-2005, his death)
- Children: 4
- Awards: honorary Doctorate in Engineering Science, Santa Clara University; 1991 Catalyst Award, that honors corporations that demonstrate a proven ability to advance women in business; 1994 Industry Week’s Technology Leader of the Year

Lewis Emmett Platt (April 11, 1941 – September 8, 2005) was an American businessman and corporate director, who was chairman, president and chief executive officer of Hewlett-Packard.

== Personal life and education ==
Platt was born in Johnson City, New York, the son of Margaret (Williams) and Norval Lewis Platt. He earned his bachelor's degree in mechanical engineering from Cornell University in 1964 and his MBA from the Wharton School at the University of Pennsylvania in 1966. He was granted an honorary doctorate in Engineering Science by Santa Clara University. He was a member of the Alpha Tau Omega National Fraternity and served on its National Foundation Board of Governors.

Platt was widowed early in 1981. His wife died of cancer, and leaving him to raise two young daughters. This life change is said to have informed policies accommodating employee needs that he later implemented as chief executive of Hewlett-Packard.

== Career at Hewlett-Packard ==
Platt joined Hewlett-Packard (HP) as an engineer in the medical products division. In the 1980s, he rose through the ranks in HP's Computer Systems Organization (CSO), becoming executive vice president overseeing HP's Computer Products Sector in 1988, and head of the CSO in 1990. Under Platt's watch, HP made a major investment in RISC/Unix which brought tens of billions in revenue and made the company a major IT provider.

Platt succeeded John A. Young as president and chief executive officer of Hewlett-Packard in 1992, and then succeeded co-founder David Packard as the company's chairman of the board in 1993.

Under Platt's tenure as CEO, HP's sales went from $20 billion in 1993 to $38 billion in 1996. During his seven years as CEO, revenues increased 187 percent to $47.1 billion. Despite his corporate successes, Platt was not considered media-savvy due his thick glasses and hulking frame and generally kept a low profile, although he did agree to sit atop of a bunch of crates on the roof of an HP building for a BusinessWeek cover story in 1995.

Platt was known as an embodiment of "The HP Way", a management philosophy developed by company founders Bill Hewlett and Dave Packard, that "built on respect for every individual and on the notion that people want to do their best — and will, if given the right direction". Platt was noted to being attuned to the company's rank-and-file as he practiced "management by walking around", as he flew commercial airlines instead of using the corporate jet. He also ate in the company cafeteria with the employees on a regular basis.

Late in his tenure, Platt was often criticized by investors and some HP executives for focusing on progressive values and long-term results. Platt's detractors said that company needed a more cold-blooded competitiveness and higher octane leadership to succeed, that his "pragmatic, nothing-fancy approach" seemed out of touch with the "go-go demands of the late 1990s," and that he had failed to capitalize on the Internet boom. Platt, who had announced back in March 1999 that he intended to resign and spin off HP's test and measurement group into Agilent, said in a July 1999 interview, "even before the announcement of the splitting of the company and the new CEO, we had spent a lot of time looking at ourselves. We needed to make some cultural shifts." Platt said, "We needed to hold fast to the core values but change some of the practices. (We needed to) speed up decision making." In March 1999, HP's board had initiated a search for Platt's successor as CEO which would eventually be Carly Fiorina who came from Lucent Technologies. Although Platt was instrumental in hiring Fiorina, he was viewed as a "has been" as she reportedly stopped seeking his advice a few weeks after she joined HP.

Fiorina's tenure was rocked by numerous disappointments, including her propensity to over-promise and her difficulty in taking advice from others, and she was ousted in 2005. Furthermore, she was perceived as aloof, as she was an outsider to the HP culture, and also as a result of her high visibility and "rock star status" in the press which led to the board of directors complaining that she was "spending too much time on the road, neglecting the nuts-and-bolts execution of her own strategic ideas". Fiorina's firing was also viewed as a vindication of Platt's previously-derided style, as a reporter remarked "While big egos and business cycles come and go, the values Platt held dear are timeless, and should not be easily dismissed".

Upon his departure in July 1999 as CEO and in 2000 as board chairman, his position was divided into three, partially because of the Agilent Technologies divestiture. Richard Hackborn served as chairman of both HP and Agilent during the transitional period of the breakup, but the two companies had separate CEOs.

== Civic engagement ==
In 1997, "Lewis E. Platt was appointed to the Advisory Committee on Trade Policy Negotiations by President Bill Clinton and served as chairman of one of its task forces, the World Trade Organization Task Force... In 1996, Lewis E. Platt was elected cochair and a member of the board of directors of Joint Venture Silicon Valley and the Tech Network, formed in 1991, to strengthen the local economy and make the area a better place to live, and he was a member of The Business Council, also serving as a member of the California Business Roundtable from 1993 to 1995..." In 1996 he employed company resources, his personal energy, and his fundraising skills to campaign for successful local ballot questions to increase sales tax earmarked for local transportation improvements.

== Career after 1999 ==
=== Kendall-Jackson Wine Estates ===
After retiring from HP he served as CEO of Kendall-Jackson Wine Estates from 2000 to mid-2001.

=== Boeing Company ===
On December 1, 2003, director Platt was named as the non-executive chairman of Boeing, after Phil Condit resigned as chairman and CEO. In 2005, Platt was instrumental in forcing out President and CEO Harry Stonecipher for violating company rules, after it was revealed that Stonecipher was having an extramarital relationship with a female executive.

== Death ==
On September 8, 2005, Platt died of a brain aneurysm at his home in Petaluma, California. He was 64.

== Legacy ==
A resolution of the state legislature named a section of California State Route 87 the Lewis E. Platt Memorial Highway.

Business positions
Preceded by John A. Young	Chief Executive Officer of Hewlett-Packard; 1992–1999	Succeeded by Carly Fiorina
Preceded by John A. Young	President of Hewlett-Packard; 1992–1999	Succeeded by Carly Fiorina
Preceded by David Packard	Chairman of Hewlett-Packard; 1993–2000	Succeeded by Richard Hackborn
