= Lucy Stedman Lamson =

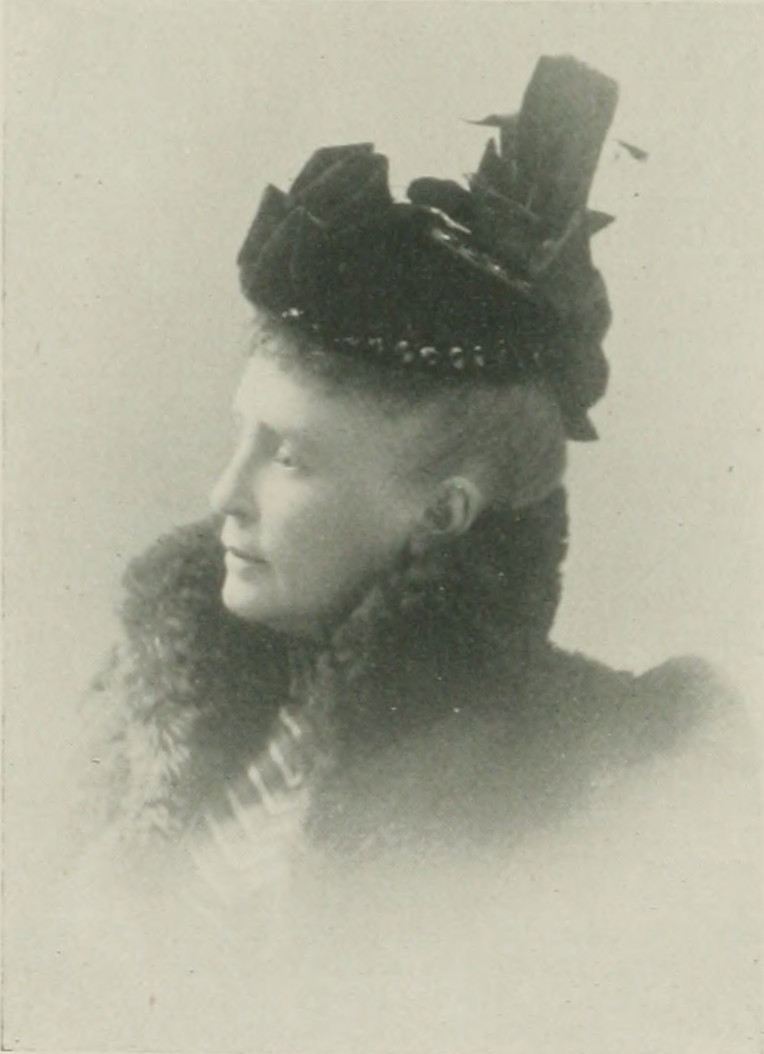
Lucy Stedman Lamson, "A woman of the century"

Lucy Stedman Lamson (June 19, 1857 – September 2, 1926) was an American businesswoman and educator.

In 1918, the music in the 30 grade schools of Tacoma, Washington was under the supervision of Lamson, prominently known through the Northwest as a director of public school music. Cooperating with her in her work were the 300 teachers of the grade schools, where the following threefold system-plan was established by Lamson: sight singing and the singing of two, three- and four-part standard choruses; a thorough knowledge of the patriotic and best war songs; and organized chorus of children to lead in a series of community "sings", assisted by a local orchestra and soloists.

Stedman made a fortune in buying and selling real estate in Washington state. Her career stood out in defiance of the tradition in her era of women's inefficiency in money and business matters. Her home became one of the landmarks of Tacoma.

== Early life and education ==
Lucy Stedman Lamson was born in Albany, New York, June 19, 1857. Her father, Homer B. Lamson, was a lawyer of note, who died in 1876. Her mother, Caroline Francis Brayton Lamson, was a woman of culture and died at an early age, leaving three children, Lucy S., Hattie B. and William Ford.

Lamson was educated in a private school and in the public schools of Albany. She was a student of the Albany High School for one year and attended the Adams Collegiate Institute, Adams, New York, four years, where she was graduated in 1874.

== Career ==
After graduation, she taught in the public schools of Adams, Cape Vincent, Albany, and Brooklyn, New York, and Tacoma, Washington. In 1886, she was graduated from the State Normal School in Albany, New York (now, University at Albany, SUNY, and in the following year, she studied with special teachers in New York City.

In September, 1888, she accepted a position in the Annie Wright Seminary, Tacoma. During 1888 and 1889, much excitement prevailed in regard to land speculations, and Lamson, not being in possession of funds, borrowed them and purchased city lots, which she sold at a profit. In March, 1889, she filed a timber claim and a pre-emption in Skamania County, Washington, and in June, in the beginning of the summer vacation, she moved her household goods to her pre-emption, and, accompanied by a young Norwegian woman, commenced the six months' residence required by the government to obtain the title to the land. The claim was situated 9 miles (14 km) above Cape Horn, Washougal River, a branch of the Columbia River. Having complied with the law and gained possession of the timber claim and pre-emption, Lamson sold both at an advantage and invested the proceeds in real estate. In September, 1890, she accepted a position in the Tacoma High School. She had charge of 160 pupils in vocal music, elocution, and physical culture, and instructed the city teachers, 110 in all, in music and gymnastics.

== Personal life ==
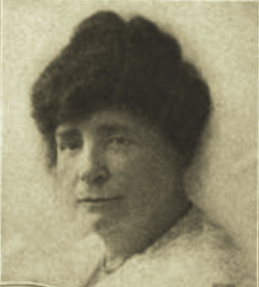
1918

In the fall of 1890, she built a small house in the northern part of Tacoma, which she made her home.

She died in Tacoma, September 2, 1926, and was buried at Albany Rural Cemetery, Menands, New York.
