= Lampson (surname) =

Lampson is a surname. Notable people with the surname include:

- Butler Lampson (born 1943), computer scientist
- Sir Curtis Lampson, 1st Baronet (1806–1885), businessman and 1st Baronet of Rowfant
- E. W. Lampson (1904–1997), member of the Ohio House of Representatives
- Elbert L. Lampson (1852–1930), American politician
- Elmar Lampson (born 1952), German composer and academic
- Miles Lampson, 1st Baron Killearn (1880–1964), British diplomat
- Nick Lampson (born 1945), American politician

== See also ==
- Frederick Locker-Lampson (1821–1895), English poet
- Godfrey Locker-Lampson (1875–1946) British politician
- Oliver Locker-Lampson (1880–1954) British politician
