= Paul V. Gadola =

American judge (1929–2014)

Senior Judge of the United States District Court for the Eastern District of Michigan
- In office January 31, 2001 – December 26, 2014

Judge of the United States District Court for the Eastern District of Michigan
- In office October 17, 1988 – January 31, 2001
- Appointed by: Ronald Reagan
- Preceded by: John Feikens
- Succeeded by: Thomas Lamson Ludington

Personal details
- Born: Paul Victor Gadola; July 21, 1929 Flint, Michigan
- Died: December 26, 2014 (aged 85) East Lansing, Michigan
- Education: Michigan State University (A.B.); University of Michigan Law School (J.D.)

Paul Victor Gadola (July 21, 1929 – December 26, 2014) was a United States district judge of the United States District Court for the Eastern District of Michigan.

== Education and career ==
Gadola was born in Flint, Michigan. He attended University of Michigan from September 1947 to June 1948. He attended Flint Junior College in Flint Michigan from June 1948 to August 1949 and received an Associate of Arts. He received an Artium Baccalaureus from Michigan State University in 1951 and a Juris Doctor from the University of Michigan Law School in 1953.

He was in the United States Army from November 1953 to September 1955 and was a private first class in the finance corps. He was in private practice in Flint from 1955 to 1988.

== Federal judicial service ==
On April 23, 1987, Gadola was nominated by President Ronald Reagan to a seat on the United States District Court for the Eastern District of Michigan vacated by Judge John Feikens. Gadola was confirmed by the United States Senate on October 14, 1988, and received his commission on October 17, 1988. He assumed senior status on January 31, 2001 and stopped hearing cases in September 2008. He was succeeded by Judge Thomas Lamson Ludington.

== Death ==
Gadola died on December 26, 2014, at Burcham Hills Retirement Community in East Lansing, Michigan.

== Sources ==
Legal offices
| Preceded by John Feikens | Judge of the United States District Court for the Eastern District of Michigan; 1988–2001 | Succeeded by Thomas Lamson Ludington |
