= Rufus Lamson House =

Historic house in Massachusetts, United States

- U.S. National Register of Historic Places
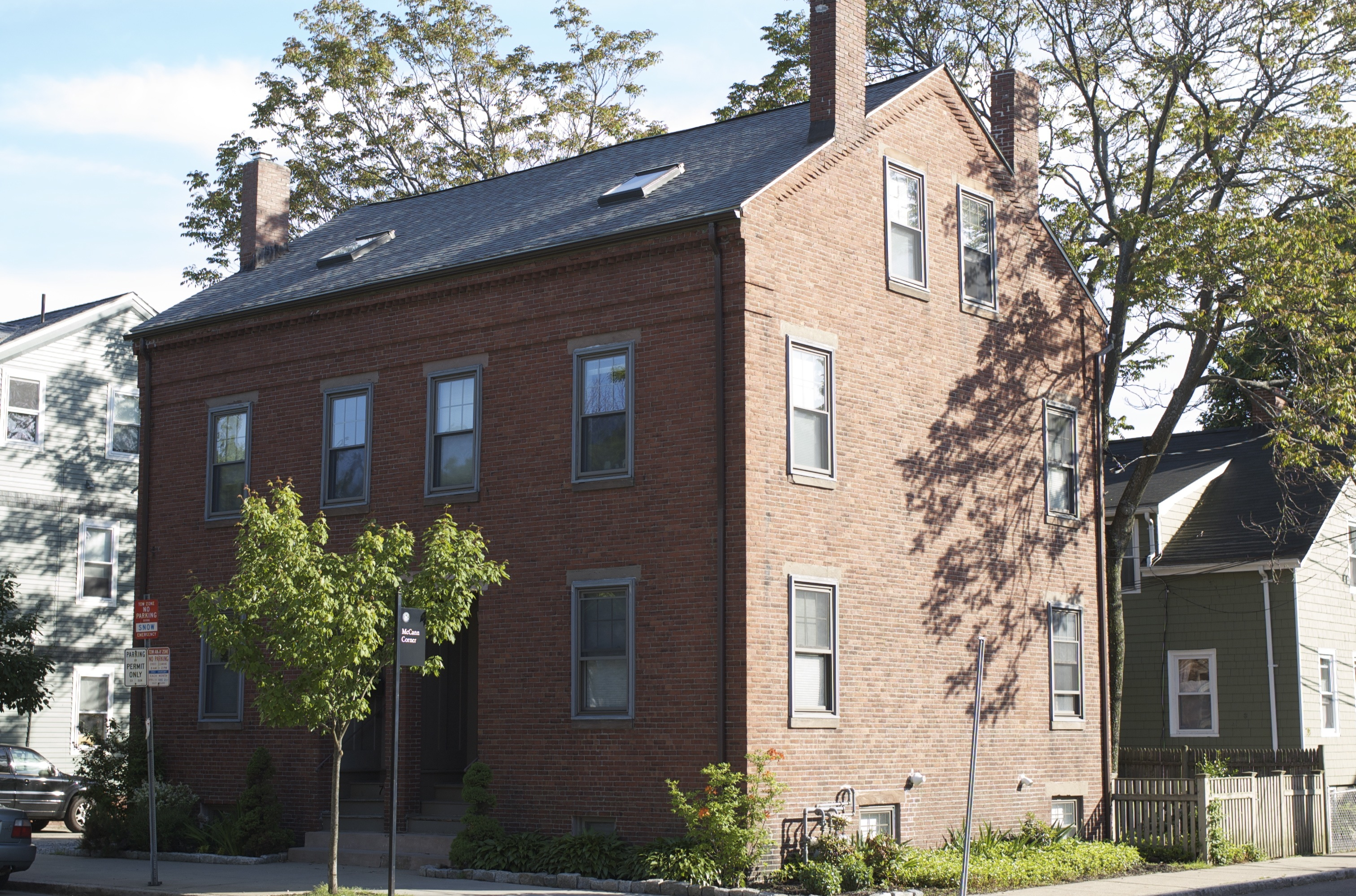

- Location within Massachusetts Location within the United States
- Location: 72–74 Hampshire Street, Cambridge, Massachusetts
- Coordinates: 42°22′04″N 71°05′37.8″W
- Built: 1854
- Architectural style: Greek Revival
- MPS: Cambridge MRA
- NRHP reference No.: 82001955
- Added to NRHP: April 13, 1982

Rufus Lamson House is a historic house in Cambridge, Massachusetts, listed on the National Register of Historic Places in 1982, a few blocks from the Lamson Place.

The house was apparently built and owned by Rufus Lamson (October 2, 1809 – July 13, 1879) and then inherited by his widow Mary Jane Lamson (Butler) (1812–1885) whom he married at Boston, on Thanksgiving Eve, 1832. Rufus Lamson was a stonemason and a large holder of real estate, known for his liberal treatment of the landlord and tenant relation. He was a member of the Universalist Church in Cambridge and served as an assessor for the city for twenty-two years.

Rufus Lamson and his son, Rufus William Lamson (1833–1912) ran a firm Rufus Lamson & Son that built many of the substantial brick structures now standing in Cambridgeport.

Asa Caleb Lamson (1848–1924), the youngest son of Rufus Lamson, has completed in 1908 a 5-story mansion located at 351 Massachusetts Avenue in Cambridge, MA, called The Lamson, presently occupied by Lambda Phi chapter of Alpha Delta Phi of MIT.
