= Thomas Ludington =

American judge (born 1953)

Judge of the United States District Court for the Eastern District of Michigan
- Incumbent
- Assumed office June 12, 2006
- Appointed by: George W. Bush
- Preceded by: Paul V. Gadola

Judge of the 42nd Circuit Court of Michigan
- In office January 1, 1995 – June 12, 2006

Personal details
- Born: Thomas Lamson Ludington; December 28, 1953 (age 72) Midland, Michigan, U.S.
- Education: Albion College (BA); University of San Diego (JD)

Thomas Lamson Ludington (born December 28, 1953) is a United States district judge of the United States District Court for the Eastern District of Michigan. Although the Eastern District of Michigan's other 14 judges cover the Southern Division, Ludington is the only judge for the entire Northern Division, which covers nearly a quarter of Michigan's land mass.

== Education and career ==
Born in Midland, Michigan, Ludington received a Bachelor of Arts degree from Albion College in 1976 and a Juris Doctor from the University of San Diego School of Law in 1979. During the summers of 1976 and 1977, he directed the water-ski school for Culver Academies in Culver, Indiana. He was in private practice in Michigan from 1980 to 1994. He was a judge on the Midland County Circuit Court from 1994 to 2006, serving as Chief Judge of that court from 1999 to 2006.

== Federal judicial service ==
Ludington was originally nominated through President George W. Bush on September 12, 2002, to a federal judgeship in the United States District Court for the Eastern District of Michigan vacated by Paul V. Gadola. During this time the judicial nomination process was blocked by Democrats in the United States Senate, and Ludington's appointment was delayed for 1,365 days. Ludington was later confirmed unanimously on June 8, 2006, and received his commission on June 12, 2006.

=== Notable opinions ===
In Al-Sadoon v. Lynch, 586 F. Supp. 3d 713 (E.D. Mich. 2022), Ludington granted habeas relief—for the first time in his nearly 30-year tenure as a judge—to Ali Najim Al-Sadoon, who was forgotten in detention as a result of the Biden Administration's February 18, 2021 reprioritization of removable immigration detainees. Ludington found that the government had detained Al-Sadoon "not charged with any crime, for 757 days—more than 17% of his life," which was "longer than any other [habeas] petitioner—ever."

== Awards and recognition ==
In 2023, the American Bar Association awarded Ludington the Honorable William D. Missouri Civility Award, which recognizes judges with "exceptional qualities of civility, courtesy, and professionalism toward colleagues, litigants, and the public." Ludington was nominated by his chambers staff and law clerks, supported by letters of recommendation from fellow judges in Michigan's Eastern District and a judge with the 6th Circuit U.S. Court of Appeals.

== Arrest ==
Ludington was arrested October 4, 2025, in Emmet County, Michigan after allegedly crashing a car into two road signs. He was charged with Operating While Intoxicated with a high BAC. In police body-cam footage of his arrest, Ludington is asked to complete a series of field sobriety tests while soaked in urine. When asked to choose a number between 19 and 21, Ludington chose the number 15. Effective February 23, 2026, he is on an indefinite paid leave of absence. On April 8, 2026, Ludington agreed to a plea deal, pleading no contest to misdemeanor operating while intoxicated, with the charge of operating with a high BAC to be dismissed at sentencing. On May 13, 2026, Ludington was sentenced to 6 months of probation, plus court costs and fees and must undergo twice weekly alcohol screening during his probation. He will not return to judicial duties until pending disciplinary proceedings against him are complete. In early June 2026, Ludington was ordered to appear in court on June 8, 2026, for probation violations stemming from his failure to complete mandated twice weekly alcohol screenings. If convicted of probation violation, Ludington could be ordered to complete any or all of his potential 93 days of jail time, in addition to possible extension of his period of probation. Ludington pleaded not guilty to probation violation on June 8, 2026, and a further hearing is scheduled for June 22, 2026, for which Ludington has been ordered to appear in person.

== Sources ==
Legal offices
Preceded by Paul V. Gadola	Judge of the United States District Court for the Eastern District of Michigan; 2006–present	Incumbent
