= Bill Hewlett =

American engineer (1913–2001)

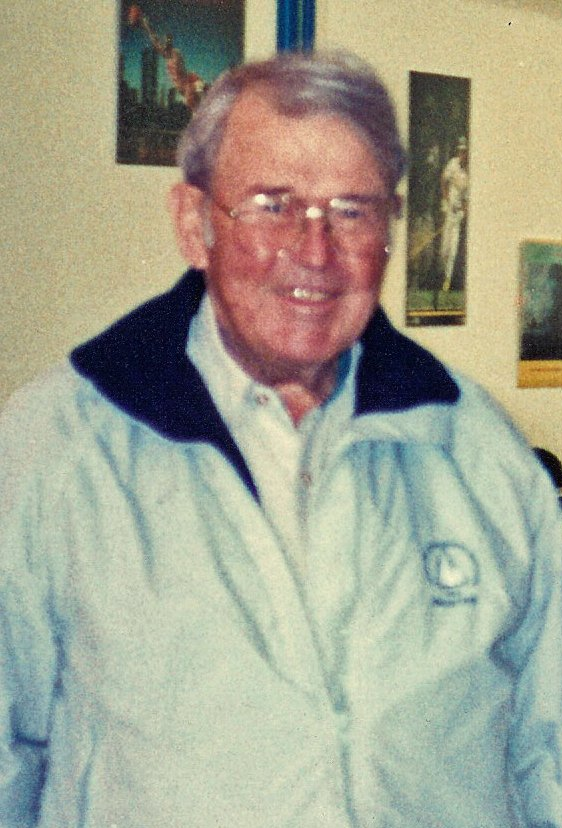
- Hewlett in 1993
- Born: William Redington Hewlett; May 20, 1913; Ann Arbor, Michigan, U.S.
- Died: January 12, 2001 (aged 87); Palo Alto, California, U.S.
- Education: Stanford University (BEng); Massachusetts Institute of Technology (MS)
- Known for: Co-founder of: Hewlett-Packard; Hewlett's oscillator
- Spouses: Flora Lamson (m. 1939; died 1977) Rosemary Bradford (m. 1978)
- Children: 5

Academic background
- Academic advisor: Frederick Emmons Terman

William Redington Hewlett (/ˈhjuːlɪt/ HEW-lit; May 20, 1913 – January 12, 2001) was an American engineer and the co-founder, with David Packard, of the Hewlett-Packard Company (HP).

== Early life and education ==
Hewlett was born in Ann Arbor, Michigan, where his father taught at the University of Michigan Medical School. In 1916, the family moved to San Francisco after his father, Albion Walter Hewlett, took a similar position at Stanford Medical School, located at the time in San Francisco. He attended Lowell High School and was the 1929–1930 Battalion Commander of the school's Army JROTC program. He was accepted at Stanford University as a favor to his late father who died of a brain tumor in 1925.

Hewlett received his bachelor's degree from Stanford in 1934, a Master of Science degree in electrical engineering from MIT in 1936, and a post-masters engineering degree in electrical engineering from Stanford in 1939. He joined the Kappa Sigma fraternity during his time at Stanford.

== Career ==
=== Hewlett-Packard ===
Hewlett attended undergraduate classes taught by Fred Terman at Stanford and became acquainted with David Packard. Packard and he began discussing forming a company in August 1937, and founded Hewlett-Packard Company as a partnership on January 1, 1939. A flip of a coin decided the ordering of their names. Their first big breakthrough came when Disney purchased eight audio oscillators designed by Hewlett which were used for the production of the film Fantasia.

The company incorporated in 1947 and tendered an initial public offering in 1957. Bill Hewlett and Dave Packard were proud of their company culture which came to be known as The HP Way. The HP Way is a corporate culture that claimed to be centered not only on making money but also on respecting and nurturing its employees. Hewlett was president of the Institute of Radio Engineers in 1954.

Hewlett was president of HP from 1964 to 1977 and CEO from 1968 to 1978, after which he was succeeded by John A. Young. He remained chairman of the executive committee until 1983, and then was vice chairman of the board until 1987.

A young Steve Jobs, then age twelve, called Hewlett (whose number was in the phone book) and requested any available parts for a frequency counter he was building. Hewlett, impressed with Jobs' initiative, offered him a summer job assembling frequency counters. Jobs then considered HP one of the companies that he admired, regarding it among the handful of companies (Disney and Intel were the others) that were built “to last, not just to make money”. Steve Wozniak, co-founder of Apple along with Jobs, unsuccessfully attempted five times to sell the Apple I computer to HP while working there. The early Apple computers were built with HP parts, under a legal release from HP. Of the missed opportunity, Hewlett reportedly said, "You win some, you lose some."

=== Military service ===
Hewlett served in the Army during World War II as a Signal Corps Officer. He then led the electronics section of the Development Division, a new part of the War Department Special Staff. After the war he was part of a special team that inspected Japanese Industry.

=== Other companies ===
Hewlett was a Director for Hexcel Products Incorporated (became Hexcel, founded by his wife Flora's brother in law Roscoe "Bud" Hughes) from 1956 to 1965, and worked on their executive committee. Hewlett was a Director of Chase Manhattan Bank (became JPMorgan Chase) from 1969 to 1980. Hewlett was also elected to the board of directors for Chrysler Corporation in 1966, a position he held until 1983.

== Philanthropy ==
Starting in the 1960s, Hewlett committed much of his time and wealth towards numerous philanthropic causes. In 1966, William Hewlett and his wife Flora founded the William and Flora Hewlett Foundation, which became one of the largest private foundations in the United States. Aside from the foundation, Hewlett gave millions of dollars to universities, schools, museums, non-profit organizations and other organizations. Stanford University was a large recipient of his philanthropy.

== Personal life ==
Hewlett married Flora Lamson in 1939, and he had 5 children with her: Eleanor, Walter, James, William and Mary. They had 12 grandchildren. His wife died in 1977. In 1978, Hewlett married Rosemary Kopmeier Bradford.

He was a committed conservationist and avid outdoorsman. As an amateur photographer and botanist, he took many photographs and samples of wildflowers. Some of these were donated to the California Academy of Sciences.

Hewlett died of heart failure in Palo Alto, California, on January 12, 2001 at the age of 87, and was interred at Los Gatos Memorial Park, San Jose, California.

== Legacy ==
In 1999, the William R. Hewlett Teaching Center at Stanford was named in his honor. The building is located in the Science and Engineering Quad, adjacent to the David Packard Electrical Engineering Building.

== Awards ==
- member, American Academy of Arts and Sciences (1970)
- IEEE Founders Medal (1973)
- Vermilye Medal (1975)
- member, National Academy of Sciences (1977)
- Golden Plate Award of the American Academy of Achievement (1981)
- member, American Philosophical Society (1981)
- National Medal of Science (1983)
- National Inventors Hall of Fame (1992)
- Lemelson-MIT Prize Lifetime Achievement Award (1995)
- The 3rd Annual Heinz Award Chairman's Medal (with David Packard) (1997)
- Entrepreneur Walk of Fame (2011)

Business positions
Preceded by David Packard	President of Hewlett-Packard; 1964–1977	Succeeded by John A. Young
Preceded by David Packard	Chief Executive Officer of Hewlett-Packard; 1971–1978	Succeeded by John A. Young
