= HP LaserJet =

Brand of laser printers

LaserJet

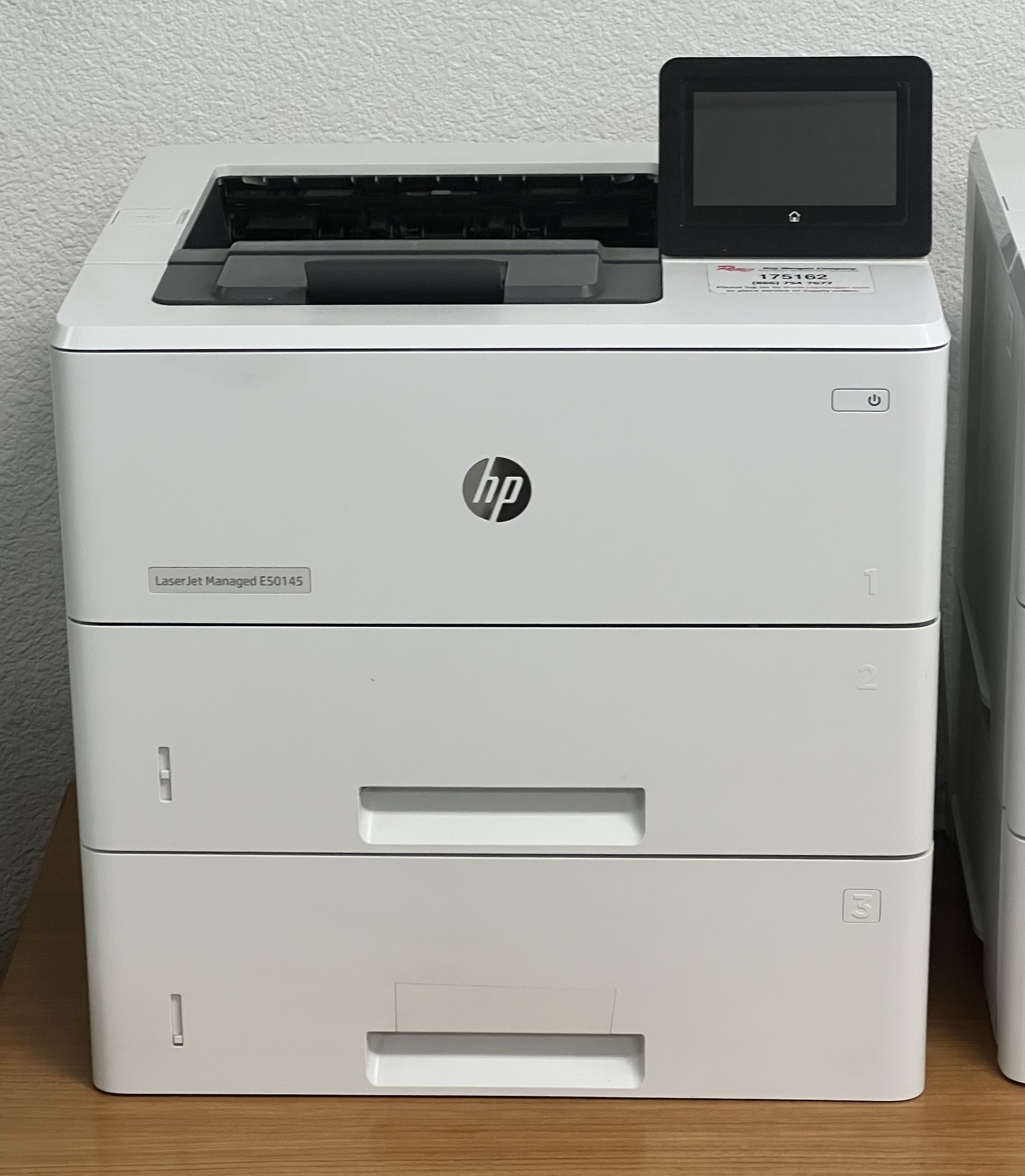
- Top: Logo used since June 4, 2012. Bottom: An HP LaserJet Managed E50145 series printer from 2021
- Design firm: Hewlett-Packard; Canon Inc.
- Manufacturer: Hewlett-Packard
- Introduced: May 22, 1984; 42 years ago
- Type: Laser printer
- Connection: Parallel and SCSI (earliest); USB (newer)
- Dots per inch: 300–1200

LaserJet is a line of laser printers sold by HP Inc. (originally Hewlett-Packard) since 1984. The LaserJet was the world's first desktop laser printer. Canon supplies both mechanisms and cartridges for most HP laser printers; some larger A3 models use Samsung print engines.

These printers (and later on all-in-one units, including scanning and faxing) have, as of 2025, more than a forty-year history of serving both in offices and at home for personal/at home use.

In 2013, Advertising Age reported that HP had "78 different printers with 6 different model names."

== Technology ==
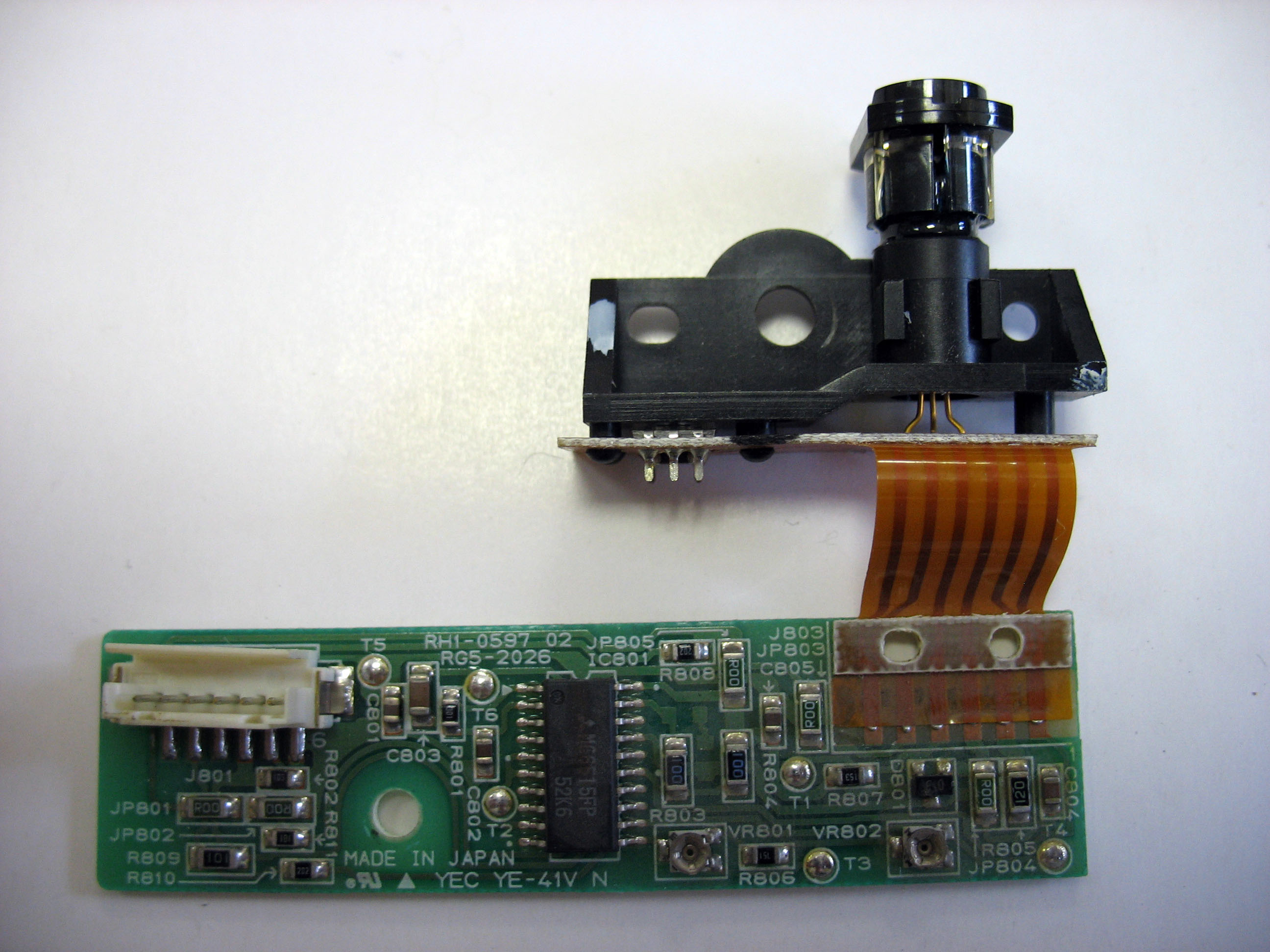
Laser head from HP LaserJet 5L printer

Most HP LaserJet printers employ xerographic laser-marking engines sourced from the Japanese company Canon. Due to a tight turnaround schedule on the first LaserJet, HP elected to use the controller already developed by Canon for the CX engine in the first LaserJet. In spring of 1989, The New York Times said that HP "dominates" the PC laser printer market.

The first LaserJet and the first Apple LaserWriter used the same print engine: the Canon CX engine. HP chose to use their in-house developed Printer Command Language (PCL) as opposed to Apple, which adopted the PostScript language as developed by Adobe Systems. The use of a simpler, less-ambitious Page description language allowed HP to deliver its LaserJet to the market about a year before Apple's CX based product, and $1000 lower street price. The sharing of an identical Canon engine in two competing products continued with the LaserJet II/III and the Apple LaserWriter II, which both used the Canon LBP-CX print engine.

== History ==
=== 1980s ===
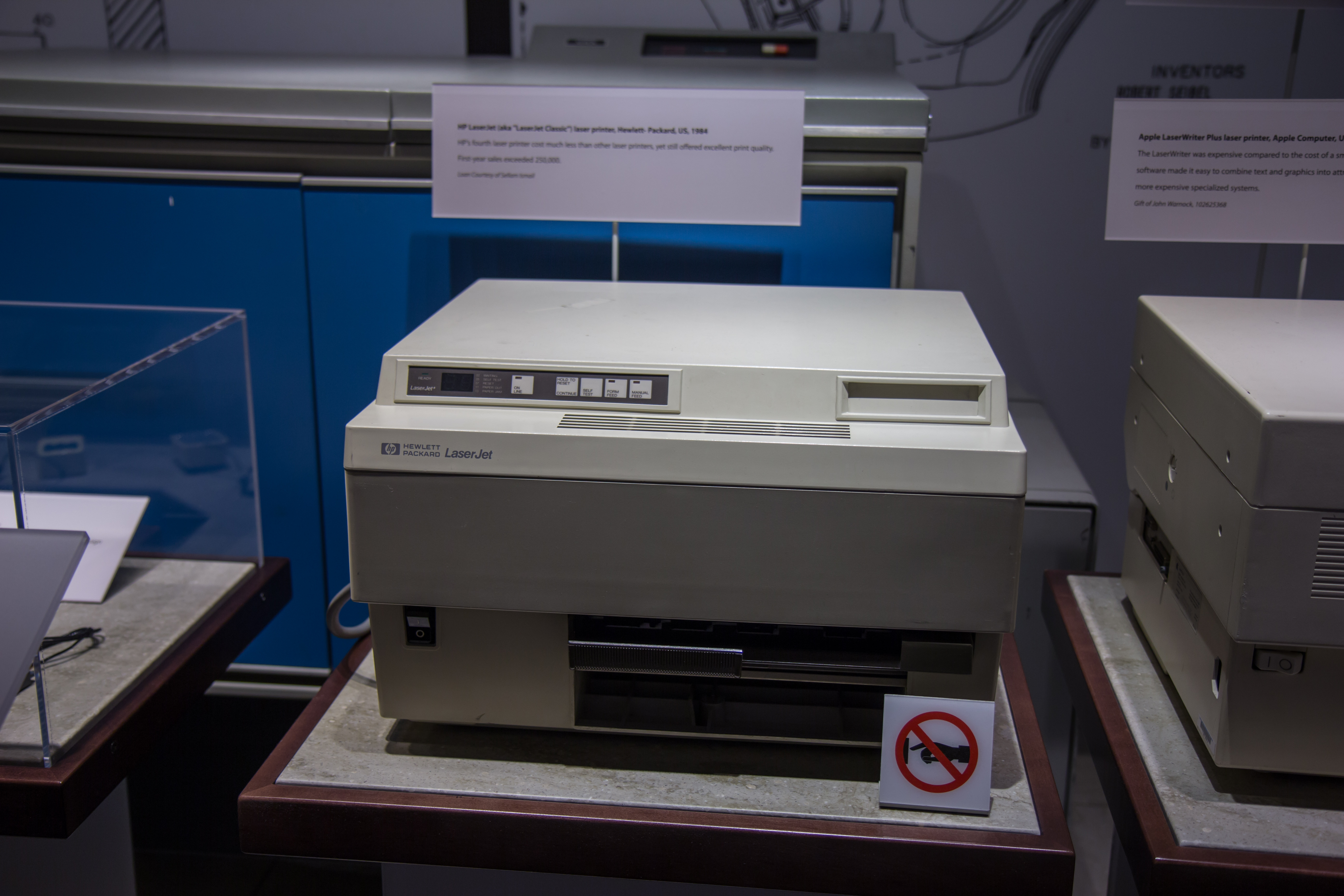
First HP LaserJet printer

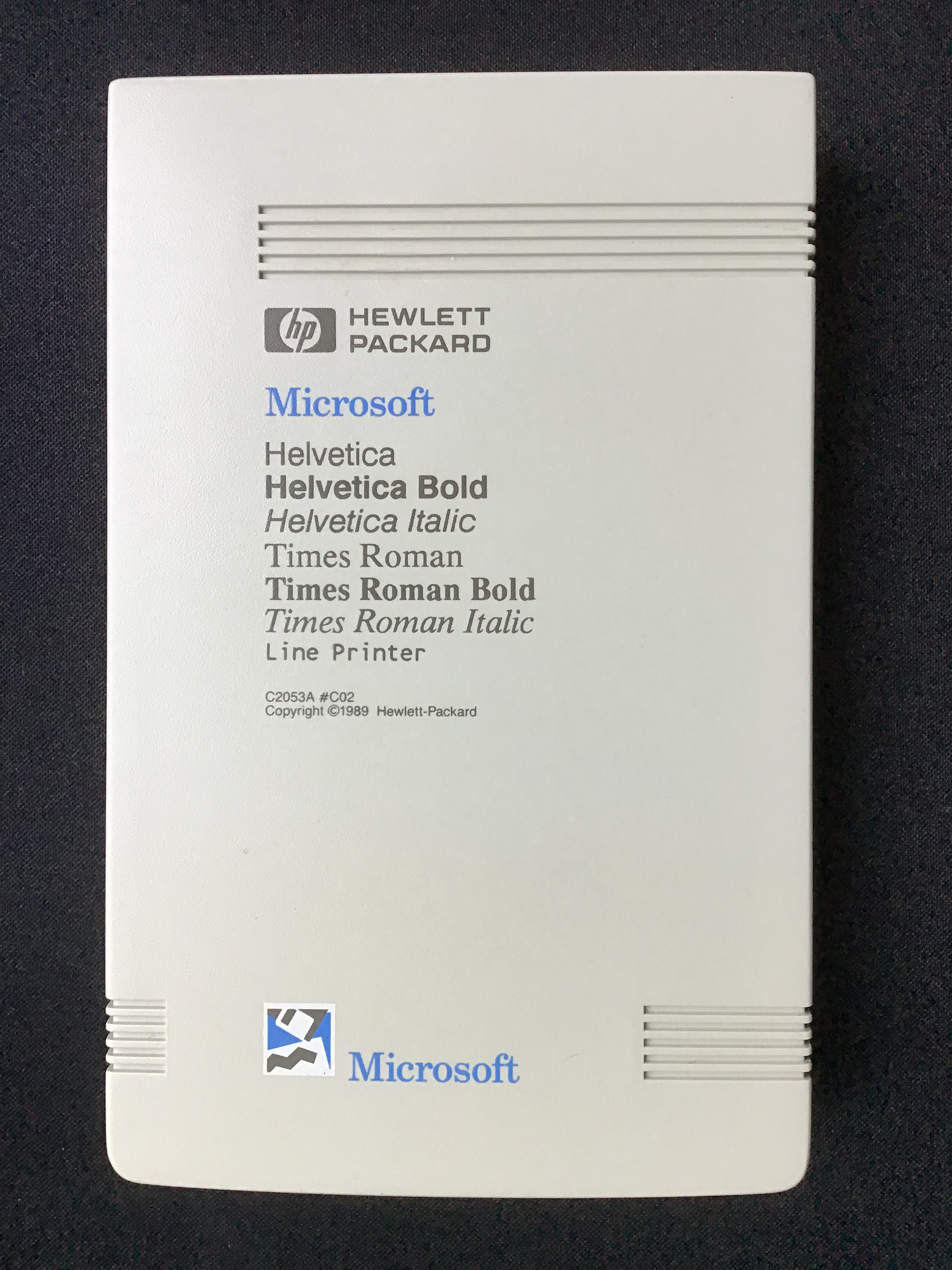
HP Microsoft Font Cartridge for LaserJet 2000, IIP, IIIP, etc.

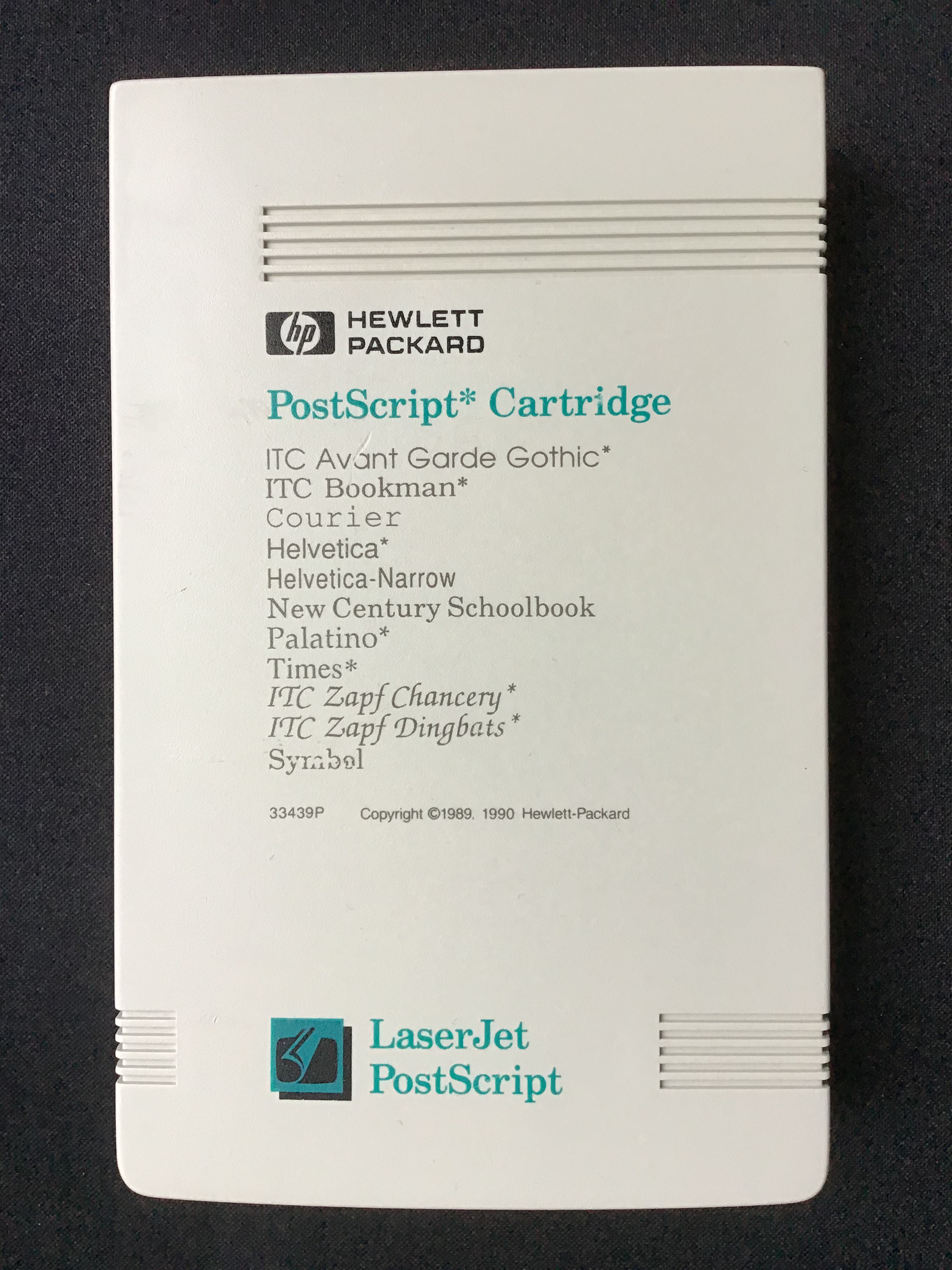
PostScript Cartridge for LaserJet IIP, IID, III, IIID, etc.

HP introduced the first laser printer for IBM PC compatible personal computers on May 22, 1984 at the Computer Dealers' Exhibition (COMDEX). It was a 300-dpi, eight ppm printer that sold for $3,495 with the price reduced to $2,995 in September 1985. It used an 8 MHz Motorola 68000 processor and could print in a variety of character fonts. It was controlled using PCL3. Due to the high cost of memory, the first LaserJet only had 128 kilobytes of memory, and a portion of that was reserved for use by the controller.

The LaserJet printer had high print quality, could print horizontally or vertically, and was able to produce graphics. It was ideal for printing memos, letters, and spreadsheets. It was also quieter than other contemporary printers, so people could use the telephone while sitting near the LaserJet.

The first LaserJet was a high-speed replacement for text-only daisy wheel impact printers and the noisy dot matrix printers. By using control codes, it was possible to change the printed text style using font patterns stored in permanent ROM in the printer. Although unsupported by HP, because the Laserjet used the same basic PCL language (PCL Level III) spoken by HP's other printers, it was possible to use the Laserjet on HP 3000 multiuser systems.

The LaserJet Plus followed in September 1985, priced at US$3,995. It introduced "soft fonts," treatments like bold and italic, and other features including a parallel (Centronics) interface. It also included 512 kilobytes of memory, which was sufficient to print graphics at 300 dpi that covered about 70% of the letter-size page area.

- In March 1986 HP introduced the LaserJet 500 Plus (Model number 2686D), which included the LaserJet print engine and formatter but with two paper trays. The original MSRP was $4,495. In 1986, desktop publishing came to the world of IBM PCs and compatibles, after its origin on the Apple Macintosh and Apple LaserWriter. The LaserJet family, along with Aldus PageMaker and Microsoft Windows, was central to the PC-based solution and while the design was more plebeian than Apple's product, this multi-vendor solution was available to a mass audience for the first time.
- HP introduced the mass-market laser printer, the LaserJet series II, in March 1987. The LaserJet II was designed as a laser printer with correct order page output as opposed to being leveraged from the Canon PC-20 personal copier. The LaserJet II used PCL4, improved features, more memory and fonts for a market price of $2,695.
- Also in March 1987, the LaserJet 2000 was launched. A high-end, network-able printer, the LaserJet 2000 offered a duty cycle of 70,000 pages per month and the standard 300-dpi output, initially priced at $19,995. In the same month, the company unveiled the ScanJet, their first image scanner. It allowed them to round out their portfolio of desktop publishing products and was very successful commercially.

The LaserJet IID was released in the fall of 1988. It was the first desktop laser printer capable of duplexing. It was also the first LaserJet with an HP-designed and manufactured formatter.

In September 1989, HP introduced the first "personal" version of the LaserJet printer series, the LaserJet IIP. Priced at US$1,495 by HP, and half the size and price of its predecessor the LaserJet II, it offered 300-dpi output and 4 ppm printing with PCL 4 enhancements such as support for compressed bitmapped fonts and raster images. It was also the first no-ozone print engine. Retailers predicted a street price of $1000 or less, making it the world's first sub-$1,000 laser printer. The LaserJet IIP (and its very similar successor, the IIIP) were reliable.

Aftermarket replacement scanner assemblies remain available today.

=== 1990s ===
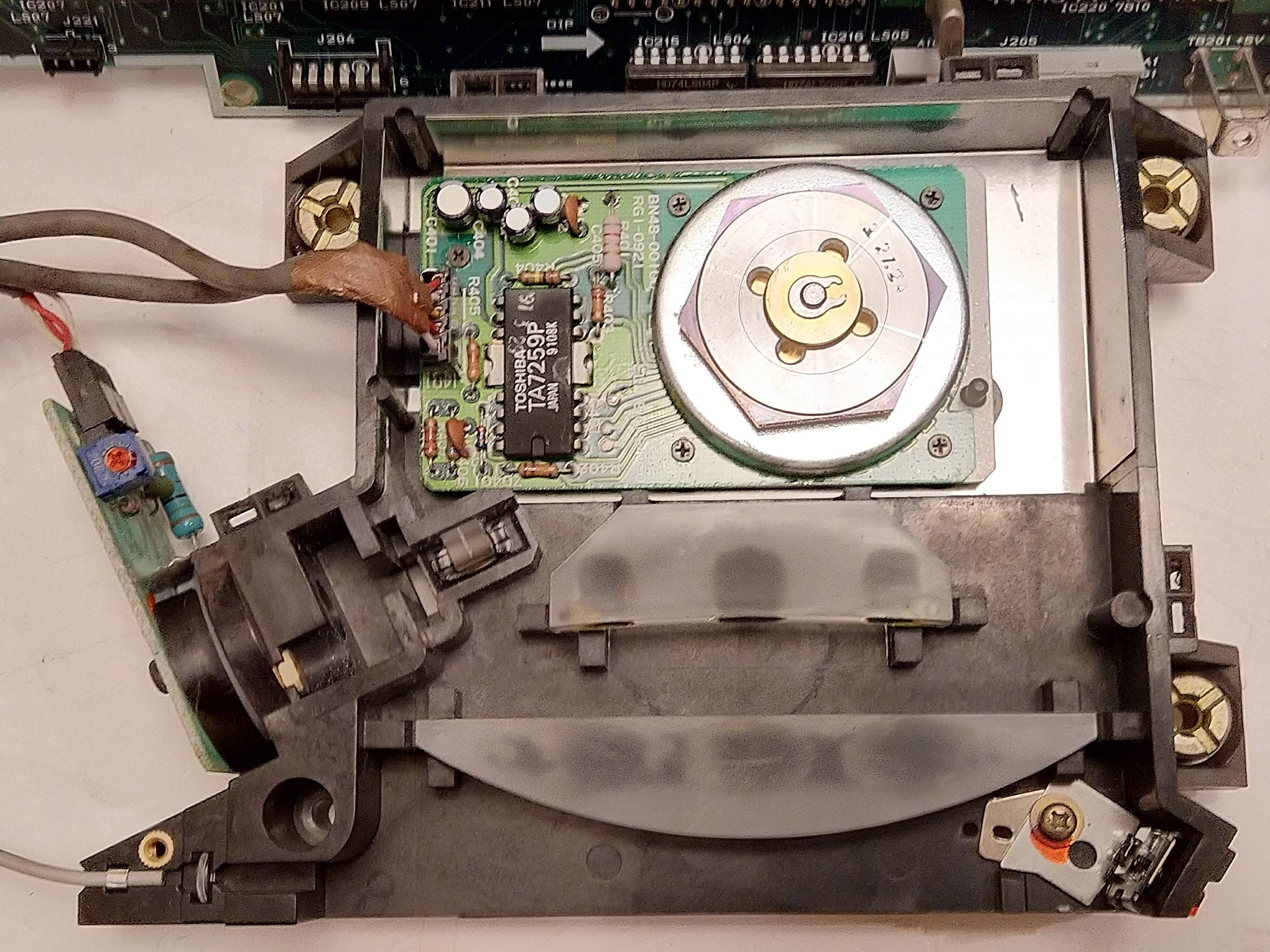
Laser and scanning mechanism from a 1991 LaserJet III

In March 1990 HP introduced the LaserJet III, priced at US$2,395, with two new features: Resolution Enhancement technology (REt), which dramatically increased print quality, and HP PCL 5. Thanks to PCL 5, text scaling became easy so customers were no longer restricted to 10- and 12-point type sizes. This had a dramatic effect on the word processing software market.

The LaserJet IIID was the same as the LaserJet III except it had 2 paper trays and duplex printing. It sold for $4,995 in the fall of 1990.

The first mass-market Ethernet network printer, the LaserJet IIISi, debuted in March 1991. Priced at $5,495, it featured a high-speed, 17 ppm engine, 5MB of memory, 300-dpi output, Image REt, and paper handling features such as job stacking and optional duplex printing. The LaserJet IIISi also was HP's first printer to offer onboard Adobe PostScript emulation as opposed to the font-cartridge solution offered on earlier models.

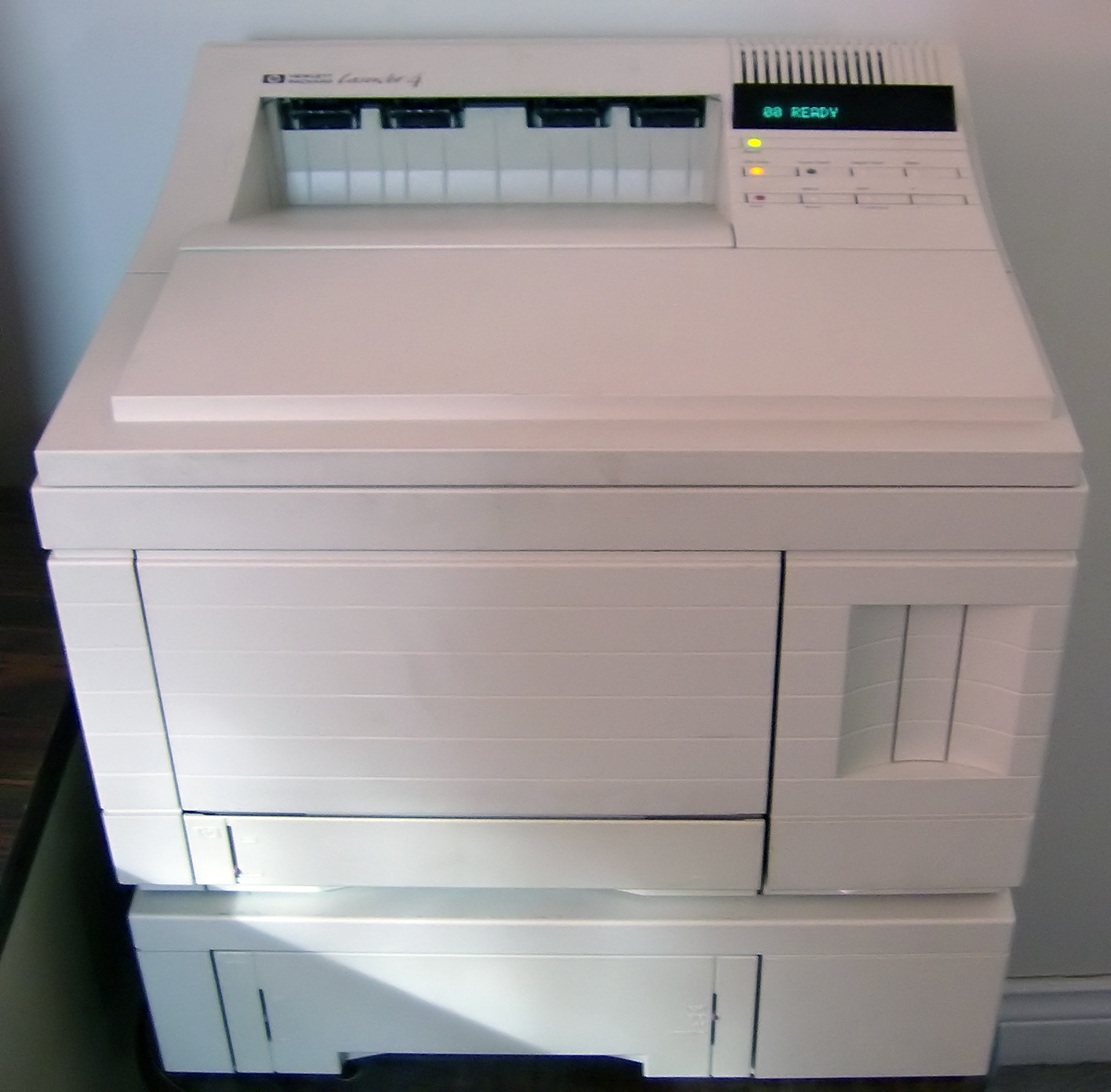
HP LaserJet 4 series printer

In October 1992, HP introduced the LaserJet 4 featuring a Canon EX engine with native 600-dpi output and Microfine toner for US$2,199. This model also introduced TrueType fonts to LaserJets which ensured that the printer fonts exactly matched the fonts displayed on the computer screen. While TrueType fonts could print on an original LaserJet Plus or later, they would be printed as graphics, making the printing slow and restricted to a limited page area or reduced resolution. Some competitors also utilized the Canon EX engine, including Apple (LaserWriter Pro 600 and 630), Digital Equipment Corporation (DEClaser 5100), and Canon.

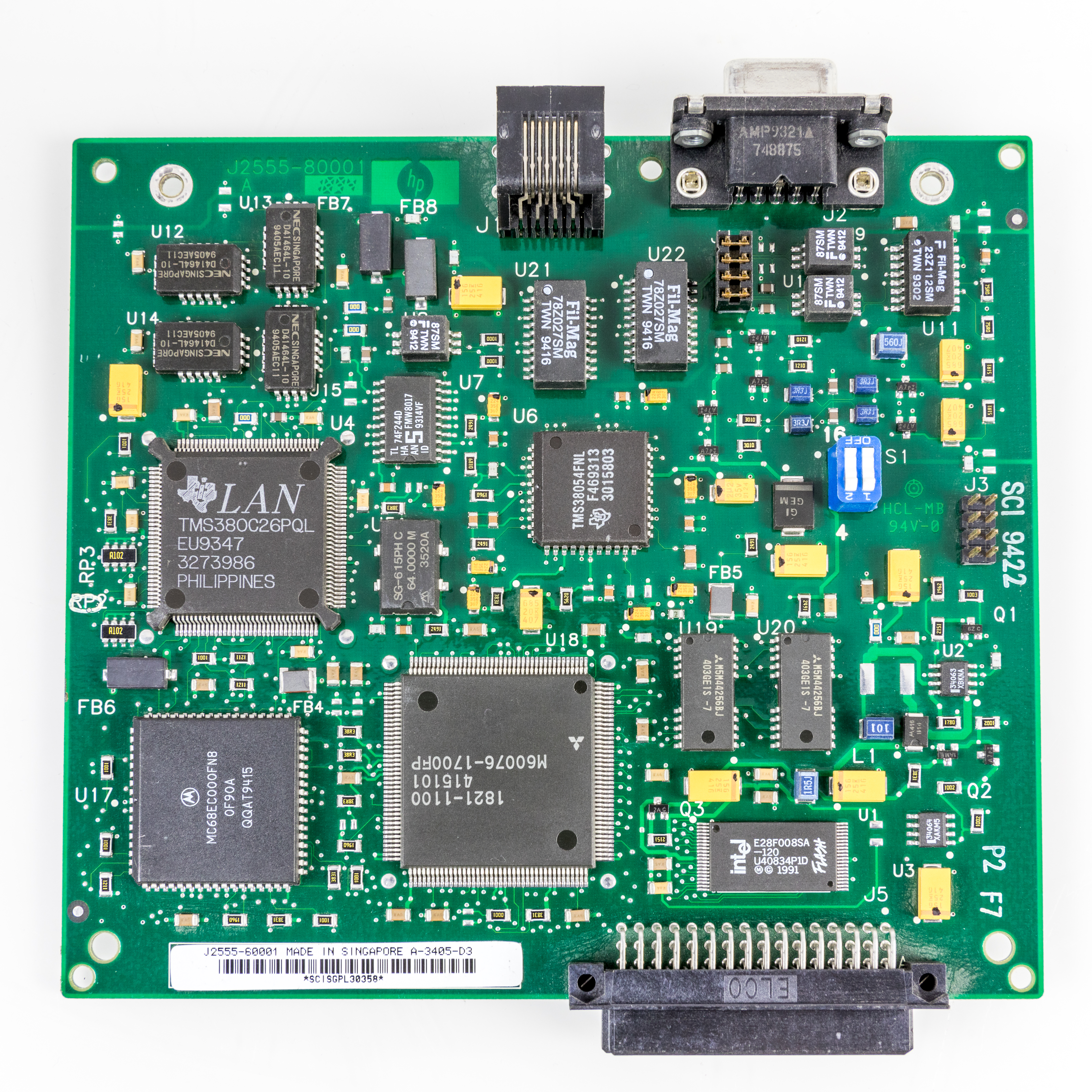
JetDirect J2555 print server card for connection to a Token Ring network

By installing an HP JetDirect print server card, a LaserJet 4 / 4M printer could be connected to a network, for example as a departmental printer in companies instead of the larger III Si and 4 Si models.

In 2020 The New York Times wrote that "by the 1990s, it was a staple of offices around the world." The flagship of the family was the LaserJet 4 SiMX, launched in May 1993. It had several network interfaces by default, both Ethernet, Appletalk and TokenRing. Instant-on fusing was introduced with the LaserJet 4L in the spring of 1993. It included a new low cost print engine. It sold for $1,229.

- In April 1994 HP shipped its 10-millionth LaserJet printer.
- In September 1994 HP introduced the Color LaserJet, the corporation's first color laser printer. The printer had an average cost per page of less than 10 cents. The Color LaserJet offered 2 ppm color printing and 10 ppm for black text, 8MB of memory, 45 built-in fonts, a 250-sheet paper tray, and enhanced PCL 5 with color. It was priced at $7,295.
- In March 1995 HP introduced the LaserJet 5 family of printers. They supported HP PCL 6, a printer-language which gave noticeably faster output, especially with complex, graphics-intensive documents. They also featured 600-dpi output with REt and a 12 ppm engine. Prices started from $1,629. The models were updated the following year.

The Color LaserJet 5 and 5M were introduced in March 1996 with 1200 dpi resolution. The LaserJet 6P and 6MP were introduced October 1996. They included infrared technology for wireless printing.

In November 1996, HP introduced the network-ready LaserJet 5Si, a major revision and upgrade to the 3Si (IIISi) and 4Si, which had used the Canon NX engine. The 5Si, based on the Canon WX engine, could provide 11"x17" printing at an unprecedented 24 pages per minute and at 600 dpi with resolution enhancement. An internal duplexer enabled full-speed double-sided printing. Automatic personality switching (between PCL and PostScript), a feature that first appeared on the 4SiMX, was standard on the 5SiMX. The 5Si series were true workhorses, but initial production models were somewhat hobbled by a vulnerability to low voltage (i.e. crashing if mains voltage was less than 120 Volts), as well as a weak clutch in Tray 3 (resulting in paper jamming for Tray 3, as well as the optional 2,000-sheet Tray 4) and a weak solenoid in the manual feed tray (Tray 1). These paper-handling issues were easily dealt with, and many 5Si LaserJets remain in service today. The HP 5Si Mopier, a 5Si equipped with all available options, was marketed as the first network printer that was optimized to produce multiple original prints (mopies). It had a 100,000 copies-per-month duty cycle, and 24 ppm print speed.

In 1997, HP introduced the LaserJet 4000 family of printers. They included features from the LaserJet 5, plus higher resolution of 1200 dpi. These are mostly used in offices and, more recently, in people's homes to replace the LaserJet 4/5 series if the user had them previously. In 1999, HP released the LaserJet 4050 series, which was identical to the HP 4000 but with a faster formatter and an easily accessible paper registration area (where the paper is stopped, registered, and then advanced for printing; a flip-up cover here made clearing of this component easier). The 4000 series, as well as the 4050 and the 4100, used partly external duplexers.

The world's first mass market all-in-one laser device, the LaserJet 4101 MFP, debuted in April 1998. Users could print, fax, copy, and scan with a single appliance. In July 1998, HP shipped its 30-millionth LaserJet printer.

In February 1999, HP introduced the LaserJet 2100 printer series – the world's first personal laser printers in their class to offer high-quality 1200x1200-dpi resolution without significant performance loss.

In the network laser-printer market, the 5Si series was succeeded by the 8000, and later by the 8100 and 8150. The 8000 brought 1200x1200-dpi resolution, which was continued in the 8100 and 8150. The 8100 and 8150 brought faster printing (32 pages per minute), but this speed was only realized for single-sided (simplex) printing; double-sided printing remained at 24 pages per minute. These models, which used the Canon WX engine, provided durability and good maintainability.

=== 2000s ===
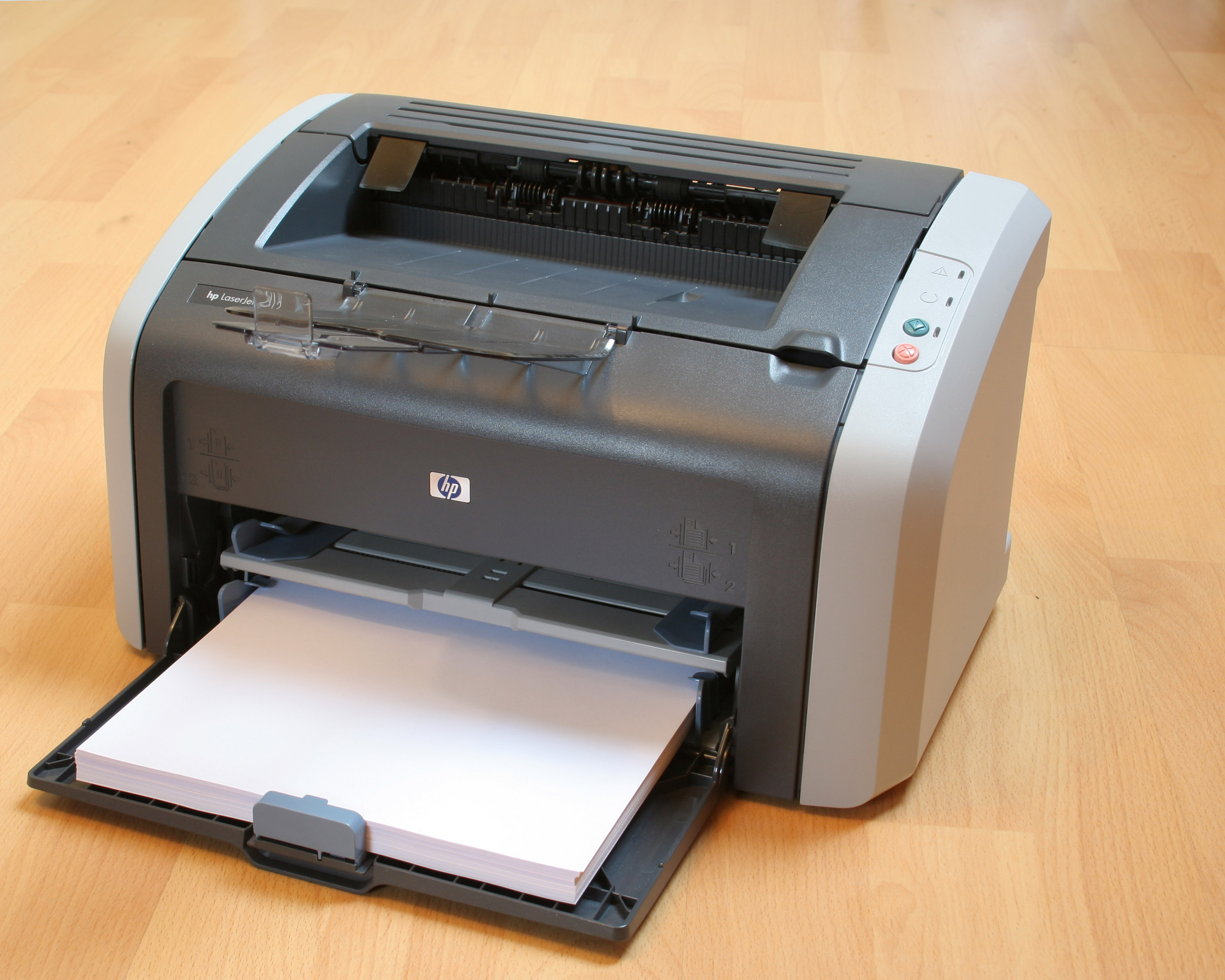
HP LaserJet 1012, a low-end personal laser printer

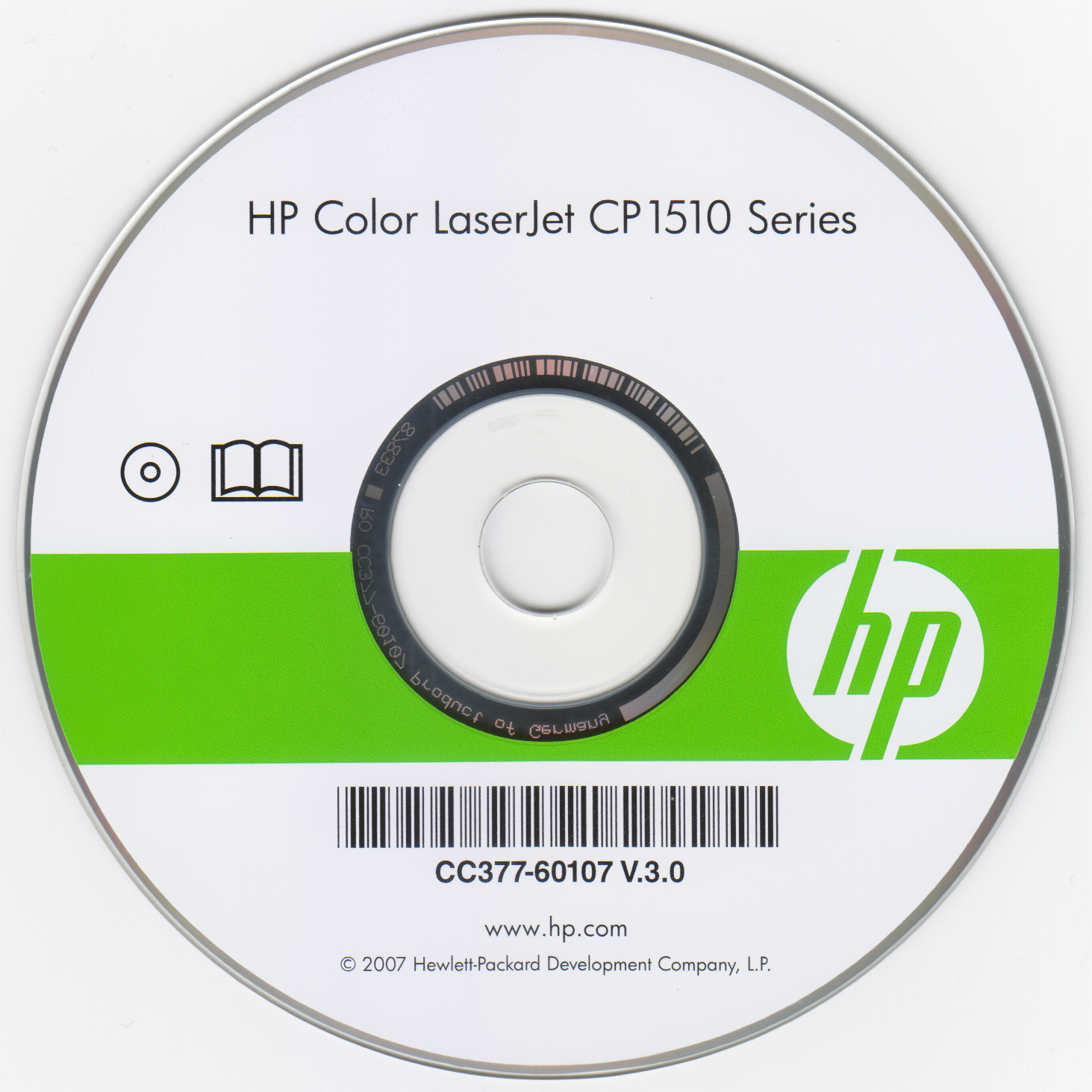
HP Color LaserJet software installation disc

In December 2000 HP shipped its 50-millionth LaserJet printer.

In September 2001 HP entered the low-end laser printer market with the introduction of the LaserJet 1000: the first sub-$250 LaserJet and the lowest-priced monochrome (black and white) LaserJet printer to date. It offered 10 ppm, an HP Instant-on fuser, 600 dpi with HP REt boosting output effectively to 1200 dpi, a 2.5-cent cost per page, and a 7,000-page monthly duty cycle.

In 2002, the 8150 was discontinued and replaced by the 9000 series, which produced 50 pages per minute and used an internal duplexer. Meanwhile, the 4100 was replaced by the 4200 (later 4250) and 4300 (later 4350), which brought speeds of up to 55 pages per minute. In 2003 HP shipped its 75-millionth LaserJet printer.

In November 2003, HP entered the $24-billion copier market with the LaserJet 9055/9065/9085 MFPs (multifunction printers), a copier-based line of high-volume multifunction printers.

In 2006, total LaserJet sales had reached 100 million.

As of 2007 HP had several lines of monochrome and color printers, and multifunction products (copy, scan, and/or fax included) that range from 20 to 55 ppm, and vary in price from $149 to several thousand dollars.

=== Evolution of control panel ===
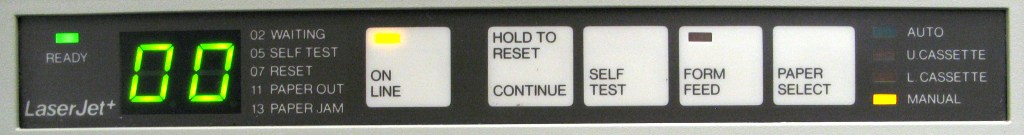
HP LaserJet 500 Plus Control Panel: the original LaserJet two-character display provided a wide range of feedback, including status and error messages.

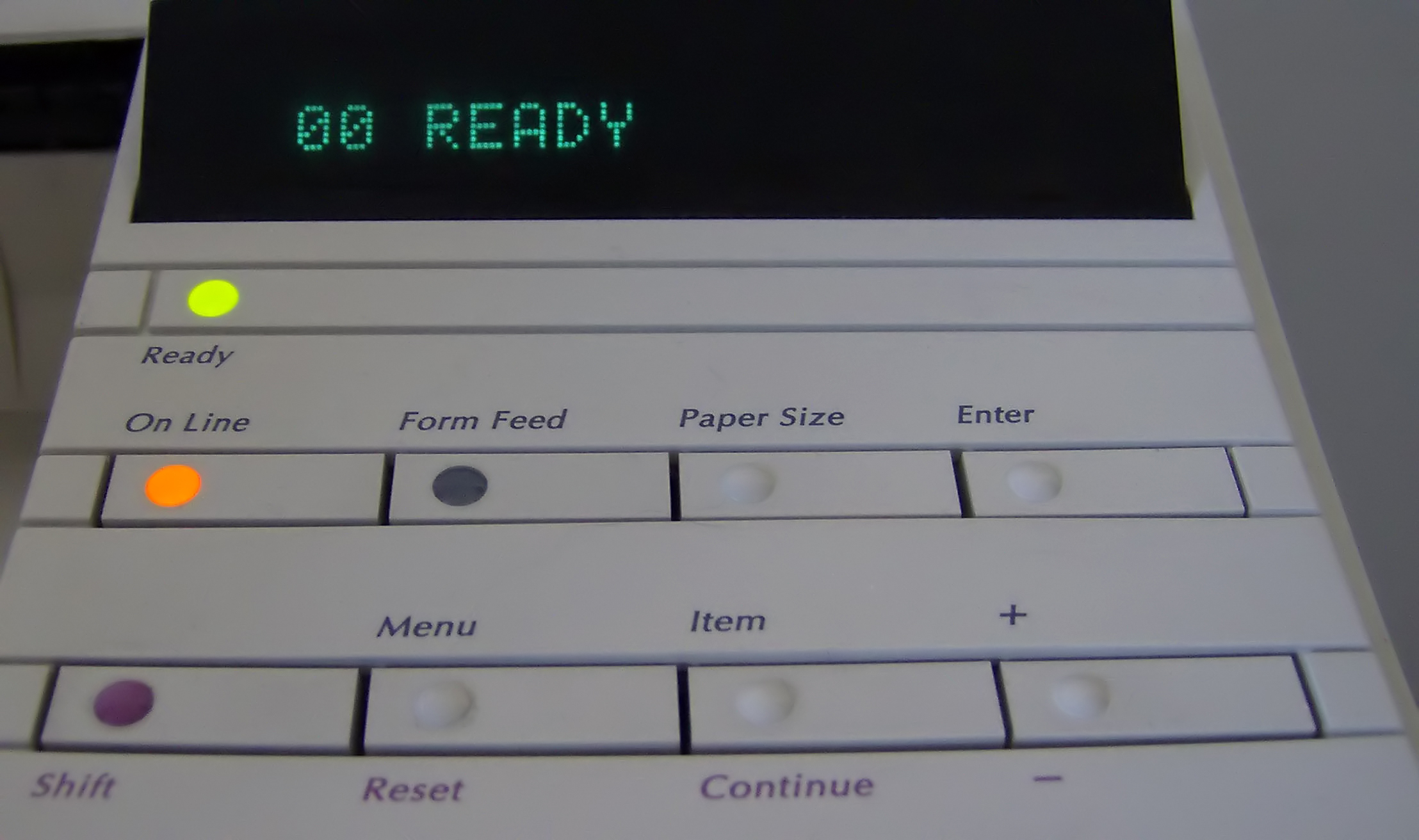
HP LaserJet 4 Control Panel: the two-character ready code "00" is a carryover from the original LaserJet display shown above, but the display now featured 16 alphanumeric characters, allowing 13-character descriptive messages (after the number and a space). Many options, such as font selection, paper size, tray selection, I/O settings, and test prints were also available at this control panel through a menu system.

The 1992 LaserJet 4L marked the transition between a control panel designed for an informed operator and one designed for a casual user. The 4L's predecessor, the IIIP, had an array of buttons and a cryptic numerical LCD. The 4L shipped with 4 LEDs, each with an icon to indicate a different condition, and a single pushbutton with a function that varied depending on context (i.e. hold down during printing, the printer will cancel the job; hold down when off, the printer will power up and print a test page, including total number of pages printed; a short press would provide a form feed or tell the printer to resume from a paper jam or out-of-paper condition). This interface was supposed to be easier for new and casual users to understand and use, but it was also much less flexible, since the pushbutton could only accomplish one thing at a time, dependent on the printer's current status. Until the user became familiar with the printer's behavior, they would need to continually consult the manual or guess what function the button would initiate.

A 4L's four status LEDs would also light in different patterns to indicate service requirements. For example, a lit error light and a lit ready light would indicate a fuser problem (usually just needs to be reseated – most 4L problems can be resolved by simply disassembling the printer, cleaning it, then reassembling it). This was much more cryptic than the alphanumeric display of earlier models like the II/IID III/IIID, IIP, and IIIP, as it was impossible to determine the meaning of the patterns of LEDs without comparing them against a manual or having their meaning memorized. The 4L used early light pipes with surface-mounted LEDs on the control board on the left side of the printer, and plastic channels to conduct light from the lit status LEDs to the top of the printer. The LaserJet 4/4 Plus/4M/4M Plus retained an alphanumeric display and upgraded from the LCDs of earlier models by using a 16-character alphanumeric dot-matrix vacuum fluorescent display. To this day, professional-grade LaserJets retain more comprehensive displays.

Before the 4L, the control panel typically had buttons with names like Online, Menu, Shift, Continue, Reset, +, -, and Form Feed. It also included status indicators like "Online" and "Ready." Users without a technical background, especially those who had not used a printer before the late 1990s, might find them ambiguous or contradictory, since a printer that is "Ready" but offline does not print. Additionally, it was possible to take the printer offline (effectively disconnecting it from the computer) without shutting it down, which was a useful feature that could also appear as an extra complication to casual users who want to use the printer as an information appliance.

When a Windows PC controls a LaserJet, the "Form Feed" button rarely does anything when pressed. It has a small indicator light, and was usually used with very simple DOS programs that did not eject the last page after sending data to the printer, though it could be used to print the data in the printer's memory if a program failed in the middle of sending a page to be printed. (In certain cases, this could be the only way to recover data, if a system crash occurred while printing.) The "Form Feed" button would print whatever remained in memory and prepare the printer to accept any new data as the start of a new page. For some LaserJet models, notably the LaserJet 4[M][Plus], the printer had to be switched off-line before the "Form Feed" button will work. Most users of dot-matrix printers in the 1980s probably found the Online and Form Feed functions obvious, as most dot-matrix printers had these buttons and they worked similarly. The indicator on the "Form Feed" button illuminated when there was received data in the printer's buffer; this made it easier to predict what would happen if the printer was put online and had a new job sent to it, or if sending a job in progress was resumed.

The "Online" button also served as a toggle switch; if the printer was already online, pressing the "Online" button would make the printer go offline, which could be used to stop a runaway print job. Pressing Shift-Reset would then reset the printer, clearing the remainder of the unwanted document from the printer's memory so it wouldn't resume printing when brought back online. (Before resetting the printer, it is necessary to make the computer stop sending data for the print job to the printer, if it has not already finished sending that job, through the computer's software. Otherwise, when the printer is put back online, it will start receiving the job from somewhere in the middle, which will likely cause the same runaway problem to recur.)

By 1999, personal computers had embraced the Windows 95 era. Many of the original manual control buttons like "Form Feed" were no longer necessary because the Windows 95 print-spooler subsystem offered even simple Windows applications more control over the printer than was available to DOS applications, which had to each independently rebuild and re-engineer basic printer management systems from scratch. The new Windows-oriented interface was more intuitive to the casual user, who needed little familiarization with the printer to use it effectively.

Raw, unformatted, text-only support still exists, but the professional LaserJet printers keep it hidden away. Most professional LaserJet printers include a PCL menu where the number of copies, the font style, portrait or landscape printing, and the number of lines-per-page can be defined. These settings are ignored by graphical PCL/Postscript print drivers, and are only used for those rare situations where a LaserJet is used to emulate a lineprinter.

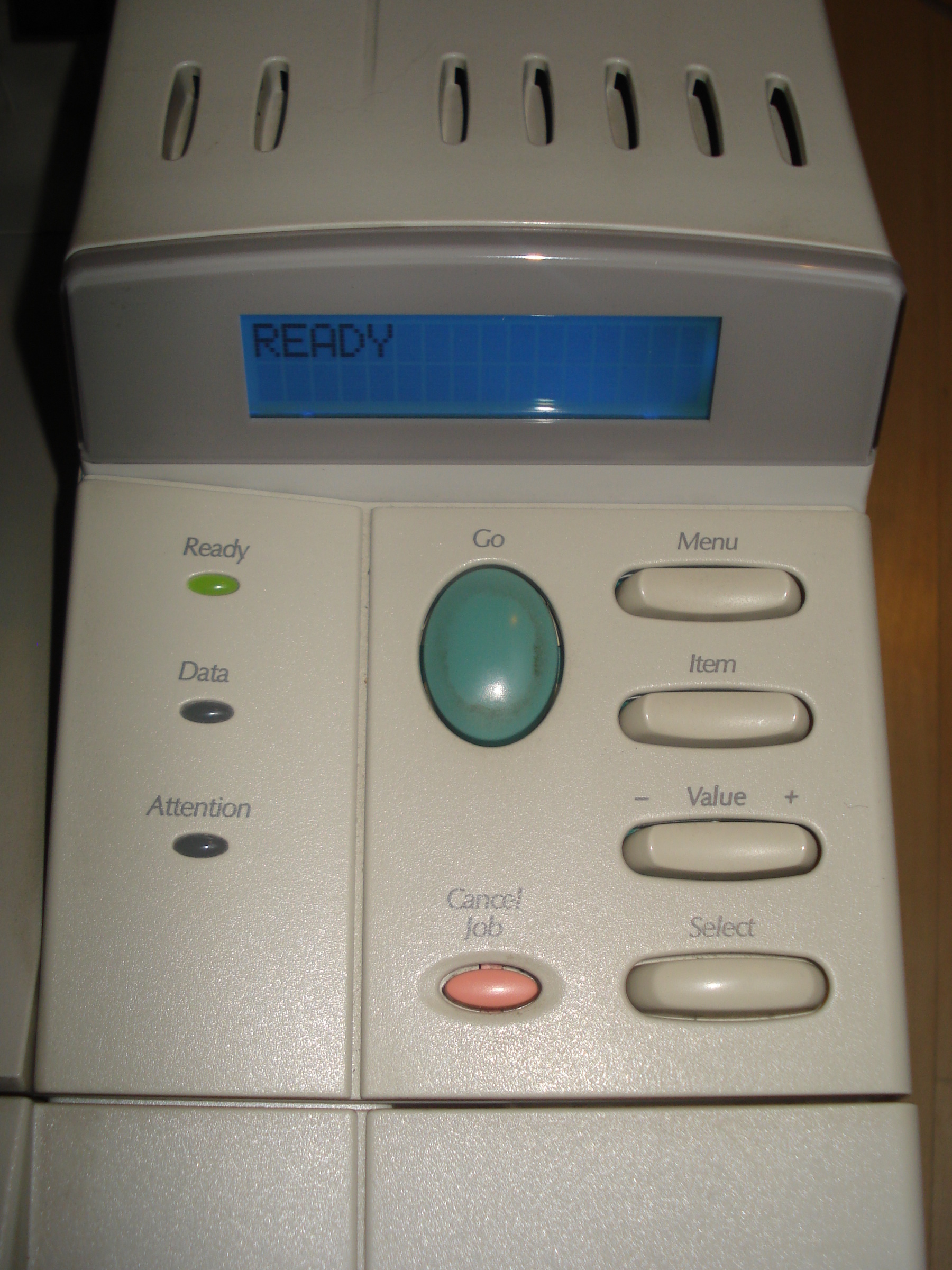
HP LaserJet 4000 control panel, with backlit LCD and a more intuitive user interface.

With the advent of the LaserJet 4000 in 1997, the control panel was completely redesigned. The "Shift" button, which might have been confusing, was gone. There was a "Menu", an "Item" and a "Value" button. Each of these could be clicked left or right. There was a "Select" button, a large green "Go" button, and a small orange "Cancel Job" button. Configuration through the control panel was easier and more intuitive; menus could be navigated with the "Menu" button, then items within the menu could be selected with the "Item" button. The "Value" button, which had "-" (decrease) and "+" (increase) indications, could be used to select a specific setting or value. The "Select" button was used to select or confirm a particular choice. The display was adapted to a blue-backlit two-line LCD.

Newer models such as the LaserJet 600 series now included a full color LCD. Two directional arrow buttons and a "Ok" button replaced the multiple menu navigation buttons of the 4000 series. A numeric keypad and other specialized buttons were also included for job storage, copy, and fax usage on models with those features.

=== Key innovations ===
- Spring 1984 – First HP LaserJet
- Summer 1994 – First HP Color LaserJet
- Spring 1997 – First printer-based multifunction device
- Spring 2006 – World's smallest-footprint LaserJet
- Summer 2011 – HP Extraordinary Colors
- Spring 2015 – JetIntelligence

=== Industry firsts ===
- Spring 1984 – Personal laser printing
- March 1991 – Ethernet network printing
- April 1993 – Web Jetadmin
- November 2005 – Universal Print Driver

== Models ==
The model numbers do not necessarily have anything to do with the order of product development or the type of print-engine technology. For example, the LaserJet 1018 printer has newer, smaller, and more energy-efficient technology than the LaserJet 4000. The 1018 also features USB, while the older 4000 does not.

Some mid-1990s models accepted the LaserJet Companion, a sheet-fed monochrome scanner that connected to the parallel port of a LaserJet and provided copy functionality, as well as software scanning and fax functions.

=== Mono ===
- HP LaserJet Original Printer series
  - HP LaserJet Printer (March 1984)
  - HP LaserJet Plus Printer (November 1985)
  - HP LaserJet 500 Plus Printer (March 1986)
- HP LaserJet II Printer series (March 1987)
  - HP LaserJet Series II Printer
  - HP LaserJet IID Printer (1988)
  - HP LaserJet IIp Printer (1989)
  - HP LaserJet IIp Plus Printer (1989)
- HP LaserJet III Printer series (March 1990)
  - HP LaserJet III Printer (1990)
  - HP LaserJet IIID Printer (1990)
  - HP LaserJet IIIp Printer (1991)
  - HP LaserJet IIISi Printer (March 1991)
- HP LaserJet 4 Printer series
  - HP LaserJet 4 (October 1992) / 4M Printer series
  - HP LaserJet 4 Plus / 4M Plus Printer series
  - HP LaserJet 4L / mL Printer series
  - HP LaserJet 4p / mp Printer series
  - HP LaserJet 4Si Printer series
  - HP LaserJet 4v / mv Printer series (1994)
- HP LaserJet 5 Printer series
  - HP LaserJet 5 / m / n Printer series
  - HP LaserJet 5 (April 1996)
  - HP LaserJet 5L Printer series
  - HP LaserJet 5p / mp Printer series
  - HP LaserJet 5Si Printer series
- HP LaserJet 6 Printer series
  - HP LaserJet 6L Printer series
  - HP LaserJet 6L Pro Printer
  - HP LaserJet 6P/MP Printer series
- HP LaserJet 1000 Printer series
  - HP LaserJet 1000 Printer (2001)
  - HP LaserJet 1005 Printer
  - HP LaserJet 1010 Printer series
  - HP LaserJet 1012 Printer
  - HP LaserJet 1015 Printer
  - HP LaserJet 1018 Printer
  - HP LaserJet 1020 Printer series
  - HP LaserJet 1022 Printer series
  - HP LaserJet 1100 Printer series
  - HP LaserJet 1150 Printer
  - HP LaserJet 1160 Printer Series
  - HP LaserJet 1200 Printer series
  - HP LaserJet 1300 Printer series
  - HP LaserJet 1320 Printer series
- HP LaserJet 2000 Printer series (March 1987)
  - HP LaserJet 2000 Printer series
  - HP LaserJet 2100 Printer series (February 1999)
  - HP LaserJet 2200 Printer series (2001)
  - HP LaserJet 2300 Printer series
  - HP LaserJet 2400 Printer series
- HP LaserJet 4000 Printer series (1997)
  - HP LaserJet 4000 Printer series (1997)
  - HP LaserJet 4050 Printer series (1999)
  - HP LaserJet 4100 Printer series (2001)
  - HP LaserJet 4200 Printer series (2002)
  - HP LaserJet 4240n Printer
  - HP LaserJet 4250 Printer series
  - HP LaserJet 4300 Printer series
  - HP LaserJet 4350 Printer series
- HP LaserJet 5000 Printer series
  - HP LaserJet 5000 Printer series (2001)
  - HP LaserJet 5100 Printer series
  - HP LaserJet 5200 Printer series (2006)
- HP LaserJet 8000 Printer series (1998)
  - HP LaserJet 8000 Printer series
  - HP LaserJet 8100 Printer series
  - HP LaserJet 8150 Printer series (2004)
- HP LaserJet 9000 Printer series (2002)
  - HP LaserJet 9000 Printer series
  - HP LaserJet 9040 Printer series
  - HP LaserJet 9050 Printer series
- HP LaserJet P1005 series
  - HP LaserJet P1005
- HP LaserJet P1500 Printer series
  - HP LaserJet P1505n Printer series
- HP LaserJet P2001 Printer series
  - HP LaserJet P2015 Printer series
- HP LaserJet P3000 Printer series (2006)
  - HP LaserJet Enterprise P3010 series (2009)
- HP LaserJet P4010 Printer series (P4014, P4015, P4515)
- HP LaserJet P4500 Printer series
    - HP LaserJet P2035 (November 2013)
- HP LaserJet M201dw Printer series (2015)
- HP LaserJet M203dw Printer series (2016)
- HP LaserJet M400 Printer series
  - HP LaserJet M401 Printers (2012)
  - HP LaserJet M402 / M403 Printers (2015)
- HP LaserJet M500 Printer series (M501, M506, M507)
- HP LaserJet M600 Printer series (M601, M602, M603, M604, M605, M606, M607, M608, M609, M610, M611, M612)
- HP LaserJet M130 Printer series
- HP LaserJet 3001, 4001, 4101 MFP (2022)

=== Color ===
- HP Color LaserJet Original Printer series
  - HP Color LaserJet (September 1994)
- HP Color LaserJet CP4000 Printer series
  - HP Color LaserJet CP4005 Printer series
- HP Color LaserJet 5 Printer series
  - HP Color LaserJet 5/5m Printer series
- HP Color LaserJet 1000 Printer series
  - HP Color LaserJet 1500 Printer series
  - HP Color LaserJet 1600 Printer
- HP Color LaserJet 2000 Printer series
  - HP Color LaserJet 2500 Printer series
  - HP Color LaserJet 2550 Printer series
  - HP Color LaserJet 2600n Printer
  - HP Color LaserJet 2605 Printer series
  - HP Color LaserJet 2700 Printer series
- HP Color LaserJet 3000 Printer series
  - HP Color LaserJet 3000 Printer series
  - HP Color LaserJet 3500 Printer series
  - HP Color LaserJet 3550 Printer series
  - HP Color LaserJet 3600 Printer series (2004)
  - HP Color LaserJet 3700 Printer series
  - HP Color LaserJet 3800 Printer series
- HP Color LaserJet 4000 Printer series
  - HP Color LaserJet 4500 Printer series (1998)
  - HP Color LaserJet 4550 Printer series
  - HP Color LaserJet 4600 Printer series
  - HP Color LaserJet 4610n Printer
  - HP Color LaserJet 4650 Printer series
  - HP Color LaserJet 4700 Printer series
- HP Color LaserJet 5000 Printer series
  - HP Color LaserJet 5500 Printer series
  - HP Color LaserJet 5550 Printer series
- HP Color LaserJet 8000 Printer series
  - HP Color LaserJet 8500 Printer series
  - HP Color LaserJet 8550 Printer series
- HP Color LaserJet 9000 Printer series
  - HP Color LaserJet 9500 Printer series
- HP LaserJet M252 Printer series
- HP LaserJet M452 Printer series
- HP LaserJet M454 Printer series
- HP Color LaserJet M177 Printer series
- HP Color LaserJet M277 Printer series
- HP Color LaserJet M477 Printer series

(Source: HP.com)

=== Model suffixes ===
Printers with factory-installed options have different model-numbers to denote the different options included and to differentiate a specific model from others in its series. These suffixes include:

- D for a duplexer, enabling automatic double-sided printing.
- T for an additional paper-tray (enables two different paper types to be kept available, or in certain models, to load paper while the printer is printing). (Some D models, with no T suffix, had two trays built in, as did the LaserJet 500 Plus.)
- S for a Paper Stacker, a device which increases the output bin capacity.
- N for built-in Networking, usually via MIO or EIO slot JetDirect (network) card and usually also PostScript.
- W for built-in wireless network card.
- F for fax capability (multifunction units only).
- H for High-capacity (heavy-duty model, sometimes combined with M to indicate Heavy Media) or HP High-Performance Secure Hard Disk.
- L for Light (only 1 paper tray).
- P for Personal, meant for "personal or small workgroup" use.
- ph+ for Paper handling (e.g. Stapler-stacker) or S/SL for stapler/stacker.
- M for Macintosh (PostScript module and Mini DIN-8 serial port present); also extra memory to support PostScript (as in 4M/4M Plus).
- V for 11-inch wide paper path, to support 8.5x11R and 11"x17" paper (as in 4MV).
- X for combination duplexing, network-able printer with additional tray. Replaced the DTN suffix.
  - Example: A LaserJet 4000X would come with a duplexer and a built in JetDirect card, as well as an extra paper tray.
- E previously stood for HP ePrint, now it stands for HP+ enabled models that require an internet connection and the HP Smart device app to work.

== Upgrading memory of older models ==
Many older LaserJets and other HP printers (including LaserJet 4+, 4MV, 4MP, 4P, 5, 5M, 5MP, 5N, 5P, 5se, 5Si MOPIER, 5Si, 5Si NX, 6MP, 6P, 6Pse, 6Pxi, C3100A; DesignJet 330, 350C, 700, 750C, 750C Plus; DeskJet: 1600C, 1600CM, 1600CN; and PaintJet XL300) used proprietary 72-pin HP SIMMs for memory expansion. These are essentially industry-standard 72-bit SIMMs with non-standard Presence Detect (PD) connections. One can often adapt a standard 72-pin SIMM of appropriate capacity to support HP PD by soldering wires to pads. HP printers of this type specify that RAM not faster than 70ns be used; this is probably due to a limitation of the PD decoding, and faster RAM can actually be used so long as the PD encoding indicates a speed of 70ns or slower. All printers will work with FPM (Fast Page Mode) memory; many, but not all, will work with EDO (Extended Data Out) memory.

Some even older models, such as the LaserJet II, IIP, IID, III, IIID, and 4/4M (i.e. not 4 Plus/4M Plus) used proprietary memory expansion boards. For example, the II and IID models used a roughly 4" square memory expansion board populated with DIP DRAM chips and a two-row header connector (with pins on standard 0.1" centers), while the 4/4M used 72 pin parity memory (and would fail to POST with non-parity memory). For the 4/4M (and the 4 Plus/4M Plus) memory modules of 4, 8, 16 and 32 MB were available.

== Vulnerabilities ==
In November 2011, researchers at Columbia University announced the discovery of widespread vulnerabilities in LaserJet printers that allowed malicious firmware to be uploaded to the printers remotely. Using weaknesses in the printers' Web-based control interface, attackers could traverse the directory tree of an unpatched computer's data storage, then locate cached copies of otherwise restricted information moments before, or even after, it was printed. This information could then be forwarded to hackers for accumulation to facilitate harmful actions.

The malicious firmware could also be crafted to exfiltrate printout data over the network, to attack other computers on the network, or even to cause a printer to intentionally overheat. Security update patches were strongly urged by HP. As of late 2011, Computerworld stated that "Millions of HP LaserJet printers" still had "a security weakness that could allow attackers to take control of" their hardware.

In September 2015, HP added new features to its printers to address security vulnerabilities, releasing what they called the "World's Most Secure Printers."

== See also ==
- List of Hewlett-Packard products
- PC LOAD LETTER
