= HP LaserJet 6 =

Laser printer

LaserJet 6

- LaserJet 6L
- Manufacturer: Hewlett-Packard
- Introduced: October 1996; 30 years ago
- Discontinued: November 1998; 28 years ago
- Type: Laser printer

The LaserJet 6 is a series of laser printers in Hewlett-Packard's (HP) LaserJet line, produced from 1996 to 1998. It comprises three models: the LaserJet 6P, the LaserJet 6MP, and the LaserJet 6L. It was not a direct successor to the LaserJet 5 but instead a budget line meant to complement it; the LaserJet 4000 instead served as the direct successor to the LaserJet 5.

== Development ==
All models in the LaserJet 6 series were developed by HP's LaserJet Solutions Group division in Boise, Idaho. As with all monochrome LaserJets, the LaserJet 6 series use print engines manufactured by Canon Inc. of Japan.

== Models ==
=== LaserJet 6P, 6MP ===
The LaserJet 6P and 6MP were the first two entries in the LaserJet 6 series. Both were released in October 1996. The LaserJet 6P and LaserJet 6MP respectively replace the LaserJet 5P and LaserJet 5MP, lower-end models in the LaserJet 5 series. Both the 5P and 5MP feature identical chassis measuring 7.9 by 15.8 by 17.5 inches (20 by 40 by 44 cm), with their paper trays able to hold 250 sheets. Both models built upon the Canon VX engine that HP co-developed with Canon for the LaserJet 5P and 5MP, while increasing the printing speed from 6 ppm to 8 ppm at 600 dpi. The 6P and 6MP also increase the speed of the built-in IrDA transceiver from 115 Kbps to 4 Mbps, making for much faster wireless data transfers. The 6P and 6MP additionally served as the market debut of HP's PCL 6, a major revision of the company's Printer Command Language that offered better performance with complex graphics and more precise WYSIWYG editing under Microsoft Windows.

The 6P comes with 2 MB of RAM stock, expandable to 50 MB, and has 45 fonts built into its firmware. The 6MP comes with 4 MB of RAM, expandable to 35 MB, and has the same amount of built-in fonts while adding support for PostScript on top of PLC 6, as well as a port for a LocalTalk connection. Both of these features on the 6MP facilitated compatibility with contemporary Macintosh computers. The 6P was later re-released as the 6Pse, which shipped with the LaserJet Internet Publishing Kit, a bundle of software including a two-month-long free subscription to the Microsoft Network and a trial version of Microsoft Publisher 97.

=== LaserJet 6L ===
The LaserJet 6L was released in May 1997 as the successor to the LaserJet 5L, which was at the time the top-selling laser printer in the world. Like the 5L, the LaserJet 6L was a compact model featuring a curved paper feed mechanism, with the paper loading into the input tray at the top rear of the chassis and exiting out to the output tray at the top front. Both trays have a capacity of 100 sheets of paper or ten envelopes. The 6L sports an addition input slot for feeding single sheets of specialty paper, such as letterheads, labels, and transparencies, and an additional output slot at the front of the printer for thicker materials, such as cardstock and certain envelopes, that are unable to make the bend through the normal paper path.

The 6L uses the same Canon AX engine co-developed by HP for the 5L. The 6L has a print speed of 6 ppm at 600 dpi, an improvement over its predecessor's 4 ppm at the same dots per inch. Unlike the 6P and 6MP, the 6L features only the PCL 5e revision of HP's Printer Command Language. To enhance the performance with Windows systems in specific, HP collaborated with Microsoft on a custom driver for the 6L, eschewing the standard Graphics Device Interface typical of budget laser printers of the time.

The 6L comes with 1 MB of RAM stock, expandable to 8 MB via special PC Card memory. The 6L came in two editions: the 6Lse, which came with the LaserJet Internet Publishing Kit software bundle; and the 6Lxi, which came with the LaserJet Internet Custom News Kit, another bundle of software including a month-long free subscription to AT&T WorldNet. Later in 1997, HP released the LaserJet Companion, a top-loading sheetfed scanner intended to plug into both the 6L and the user's computer simultaneously, intended to transform the 6L into a multifunction printer. Users can place original documents into the LaserJet Companion's sheetfed mechanism and have them be printed out through the 6L, all without computer intervention, effectively turning it into a photocopier. With the direct computer connection, the LaserJet Companion also works as an image scanner and as a means of sending faxes through a fax modem. (Note: The LaserJet Companion was backwards-compatible with the LaserJet 4 and LaserJet 5 series of printers.)

HP later reused the engine of the 6L for the company's LaserJet 3100 in April 1998. The LaserJet 3100 was a self-contained multifunction printer that featured a built-in, top-loading sheetfed scanner. This allowed it to function as a fax machine, a photocopier, and an image scanner, on top of its main role as a laser printer. The LaserJet 6L was replaced by the LaserJet 1100 in November 1998.

== Reception ==
PC World rated the LaserJet 6L the best monochrome laser printer in its August 1997 and October 1998 issues. Writing in PC World, Dan Littman called its design "a model of accessibility" that was easy to service and wrote that the printer's print quality was "excellent", albeit its speed was the slowest out of all the monochrome units he reviewed.

The 6L, as well as several other models in the LaserJet line, was the subject of a class action lawsuit in the United States and Canada in 2002 regarding the paper feed mechanism erroneously feeding multiple pages at once instead of a single sheet at a time. It was later discovered that the issue stemmed from the rubber rollers of the paper feed mechanism degrading over time and losing their grip. At least one aftermarket repair kit for the 6L was sold by a third-party retailer for this issue.
