= PC LOAD LETTER =

Printer error message

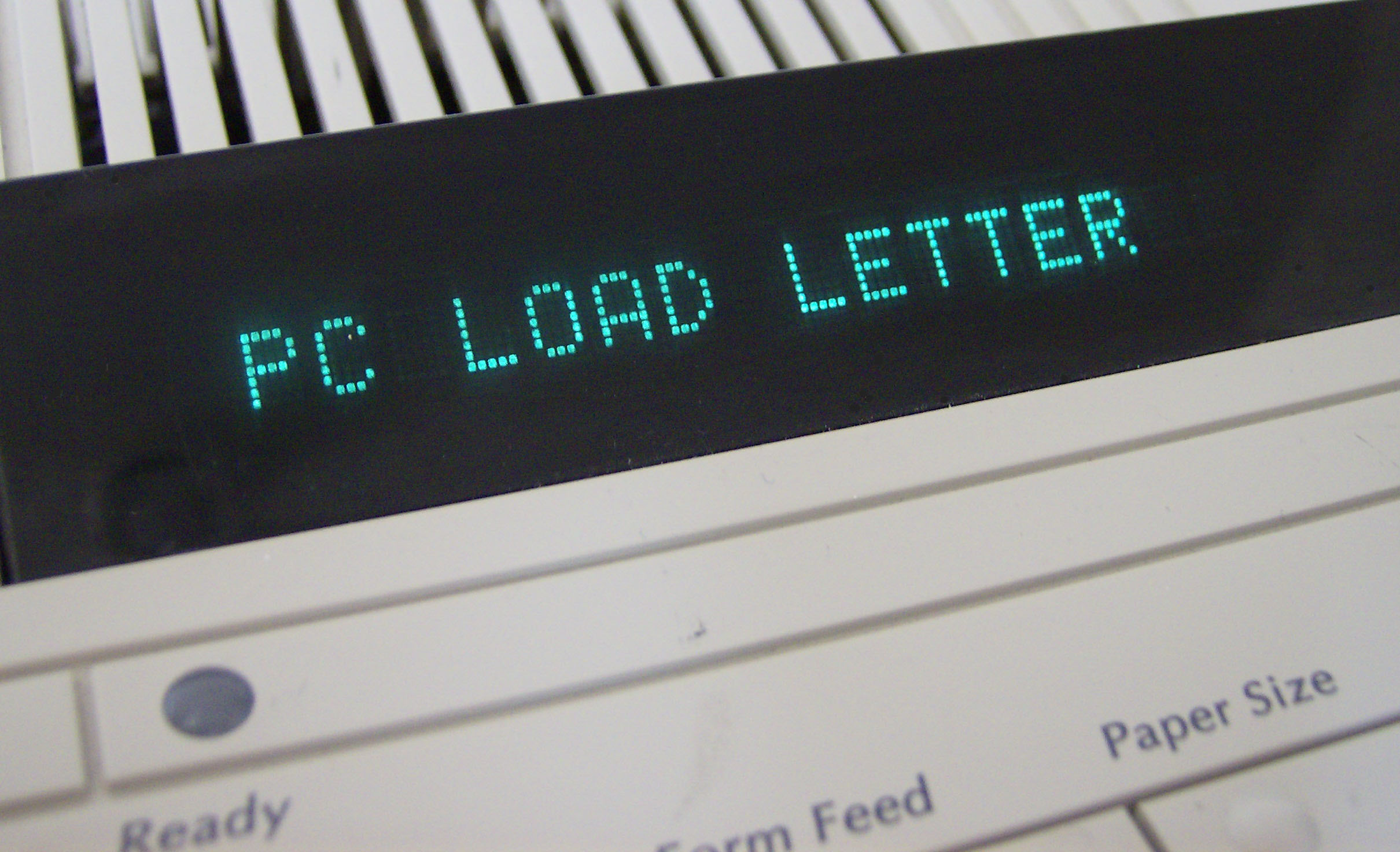
PC LOAD LETTER error on a HP LaserJet 4

PC LOAD LETTER is a printer error message that has entered popular culture as a technology meme referring to a confusing or inappropriate error message. It is a real message that can be displayed by an HP LaserJet, and indicates the printer does not have the US letter sized paper needed to complete a particular print job. The message was mocked in the 1999 comedy film Office Space.

== Message ==
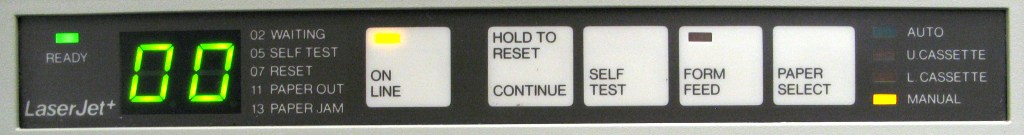
Early LaserJet models used a two-character display for all status messages. This printer is showing "00", for normal status. Paper out in the upper cassette would be indicated by alternating "11" and "UC".

The message is encountered when printing on older HP LaserJet printers such as the LaserJet II, III, and 4 series. It means that the printer is trying to print a document that needs "Letter size" (8½ × 11 in.) paper when no such paper is available.

"PC" is an abbreviation for "paper cassette", the tray which holds blank paper for the printer to use. These two-character codes are a legacy feature carried over from the first LaserJet printers, which could only use a two-character display for all printer status and error messages. "LOAD" is an instruction to refill the paper tray. "LETTER" is the standard paper size used in the United States, Canada and some other nations. Thus, the message is instructing the user to refill the paper tray with letter-sized paper.

Users are far more likely to think "PC" stands for "personal computer" than for "paper cassette", and "LETTER" with what is sent in physical or e-mail. In most countries, standard paper is A4 size, and users may not even know "LETTER" is a paper size.

== Mitigation ==
The error can be dismissed (other than by filling the paper tray) by emptying the print queue and printer buffer or pressing "Shift+Continue" and, in extreme cases, restarting the printer and repeating.

The LaserJet 5 introduced a "GO" button to override the warning message. Later LaserJet models feature number labels on paper trays and display a more easily understandable message: "TRAY 2 LOAD PLAIN LETTER".

== Cultural references ==
"PC LOAD LETTER? The fuck does that mean!?"

— Michael Bolton, Office Space (1999)

The error message is mocked in the 1999 comedy film Office Space, when employee Michael Bolton becomes frustrated as he does not know what it means. Later in the film he and his coworkers are shown destroying the printer with a baseball bat.

== See also ==
- Abort, Retry, Fail?
- Bad command or file name
- lp0 on fire
- Therac-25 (radiation therapy device that raised unclear error messages, in part leading to fatal accidents)
