= HP TopShot =

HP TopShot is a digital camera technology that serves as the scanning mechanism on a LaserJet Multifunctional Printer (MFP).

== Process ==
TopShot operates like a small photography studio that captures three-dimensional objects on a specially designed platform on top of the MFP. It also functions as a document scanner to capture text and images that are on paper. TopShot can capture any object that fits on its scanning platform.

The MFP firmware processes the data from TopShot into image files that the MFP can print (copy), send to a computer directory (using the scanner driver), send to email, and send directly to the Internet using HP ePrintCenter apps, such as eStorage. The TopShot scanner driver converts the image data into various formats, including PDF, bitmap, JPEG, PNG, and TIF.

Topshot captures six exposures of the subject; three of which are captured using flashes from three different angles. Then it eliminates the distortions by aggregating the exposures and processing them into a single image.

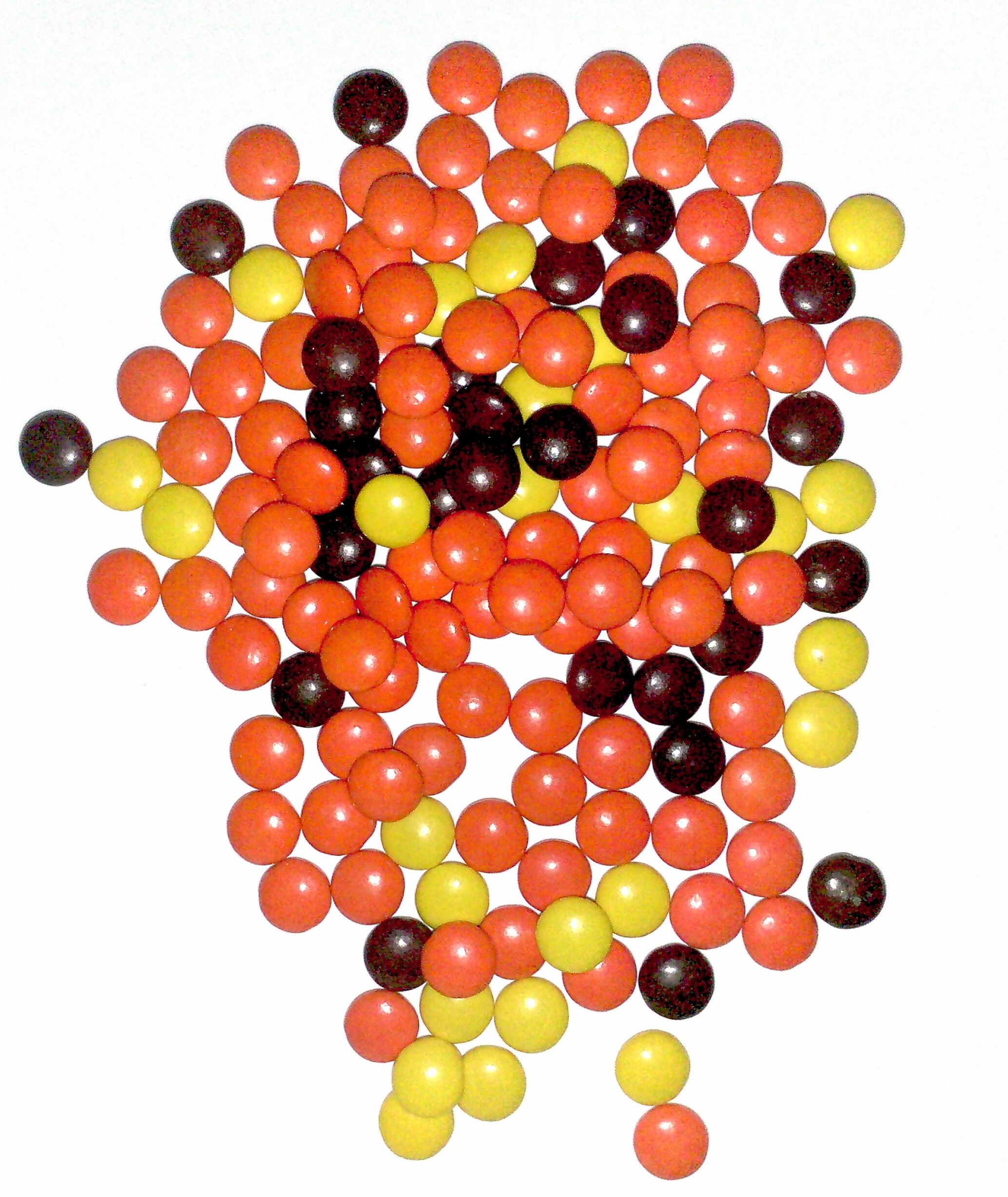
Image of candies on the scanner

TopShot also removes the background behind the object to make the image stand out and to eliminate the need to edit the image in a separate step. The surface of the scanning platform is engineered to reduce shadows and to reflect a specific shade of white, which TopShot identifies and removes from the final image.

For documents, TopShot uses text recognition software to identify the text, clarify it, and match it to known fonts for printing. It also identifies graphics on the paper and optimizes them. Then, it aggregates the six exposures it took into a document image that appears flat, clear, and undistorted. Figure 2 shows a document captured using a smartphone camera. The image is dark, and the graphic is obscured by glare. Figure 3 shows the same document captured by TopShot in JPEG format. The text is clear, the background is white, and the image is viewable.

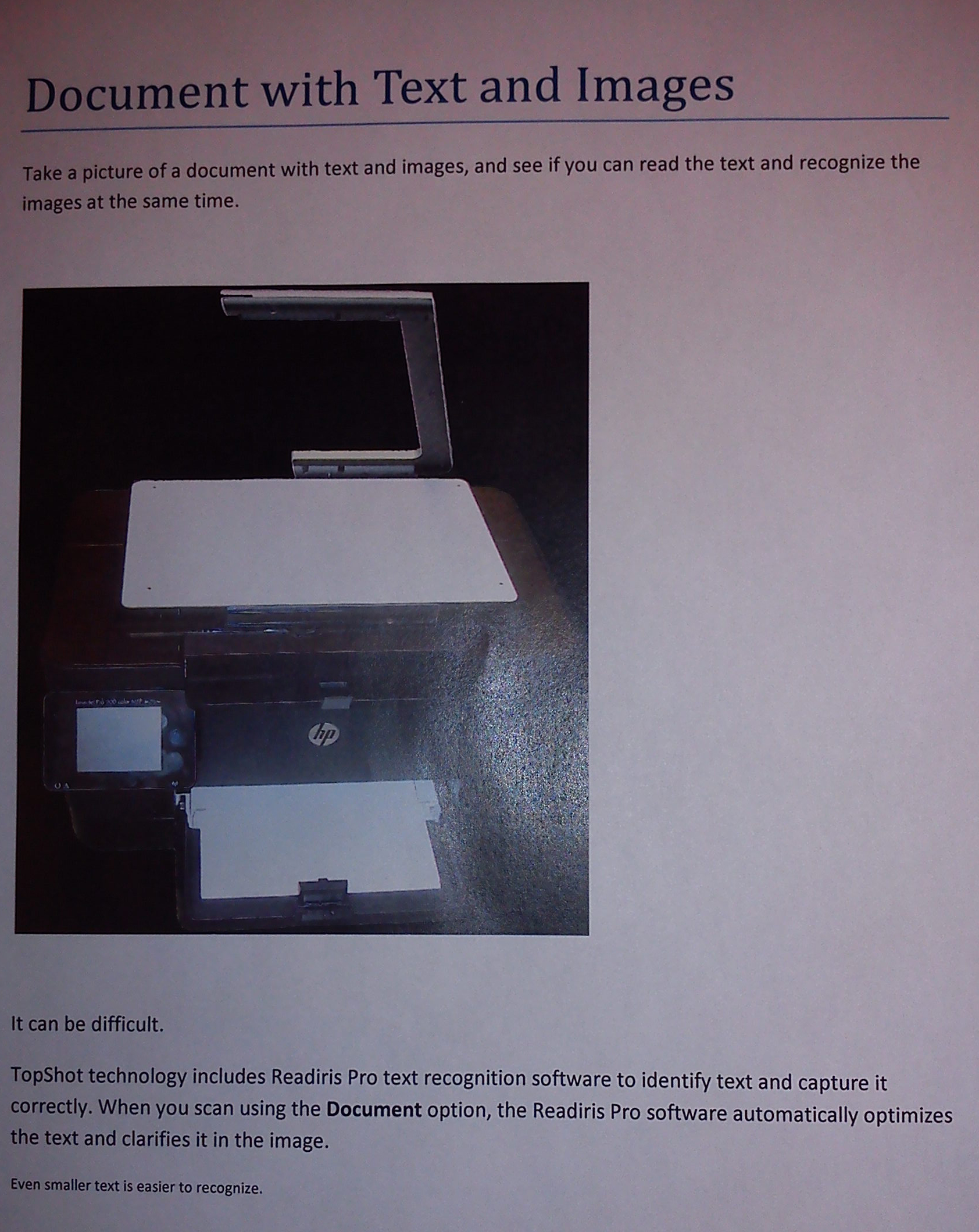

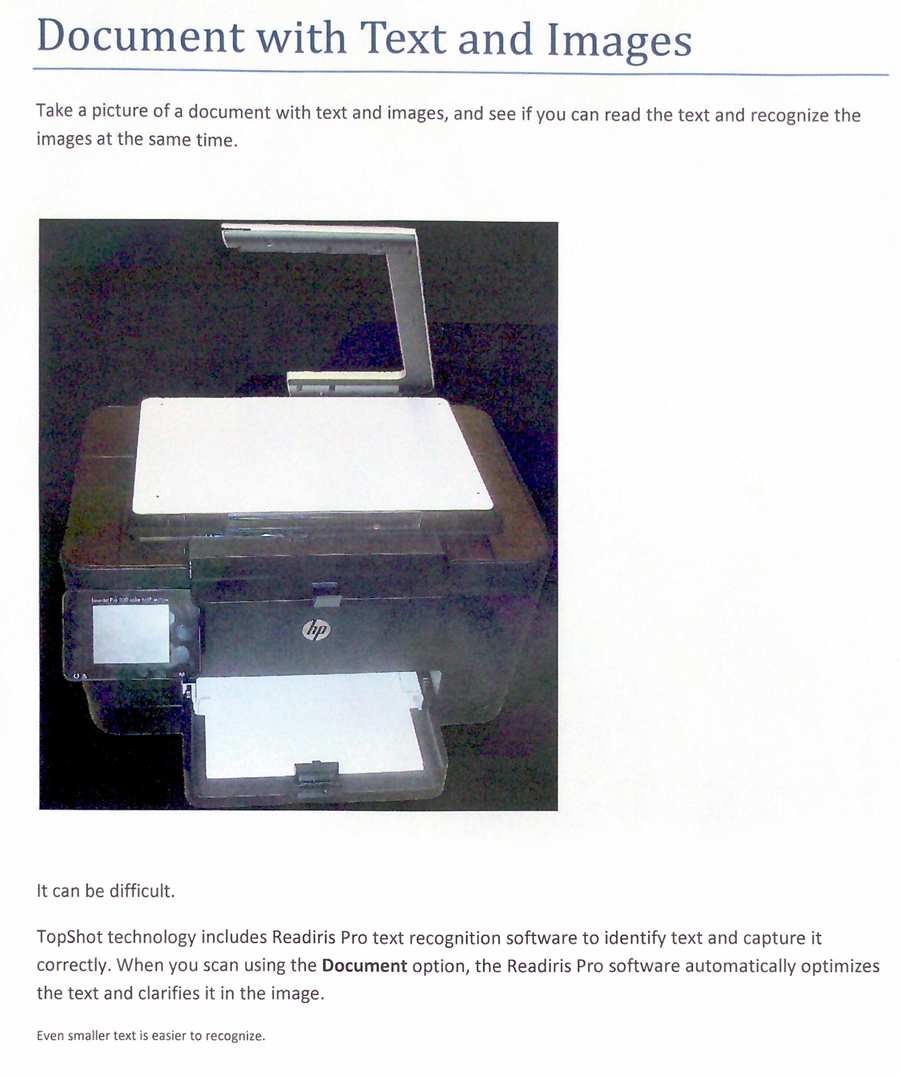

== Uses ==
TopShot fits into an environment as a digital photography device where good image quality and ease of use are important. It captures images quickly without extra steps to prepare them for use. For example, it can photograph objects for internet sales, how-to articles, or social networking.

TopShot also fits into an environment as a scanner of non-traditional documents, such as pages in books, artwork that does not always lie flat, or fragile documents. For example, TopShot can archive rare books or historical documents where the documents themselves are valuable artifacts. It captures the information in documents without touching them.

Using a digital camera in the place of a traditional scanning mechanism presents some challenges that must be overcome for an effective scanning device:

- The ambient lighting and shadows affect the images with the subject in the open.
- Close-up images of three-dimensional objects can appear dark and distorted.
- The flash can cause glare.
- Close-up images of documents present anomalies, such as fisheye effect, glare, and darkened corners.
- The type of paper and the printed graphics can increase glare especially with a flash.

HP developed new technologies for TopShot to address these challenges.

TopShot also removes the background behind the object to make the image stand out and to eliminate the need to edit the image in a separate step. The surface of the scanning platform is engineered to reduce shadows and to reflect a specific shade of white, which TopShot identifies and removes from the final image.

Readiris Pro Software that comes with the MFP scans documents using Twain and converts the text into searchable and editable text. Figure 4 shows the same document scanned using this software. Note: the document in Figure 4 is a screenshot of the scan results.

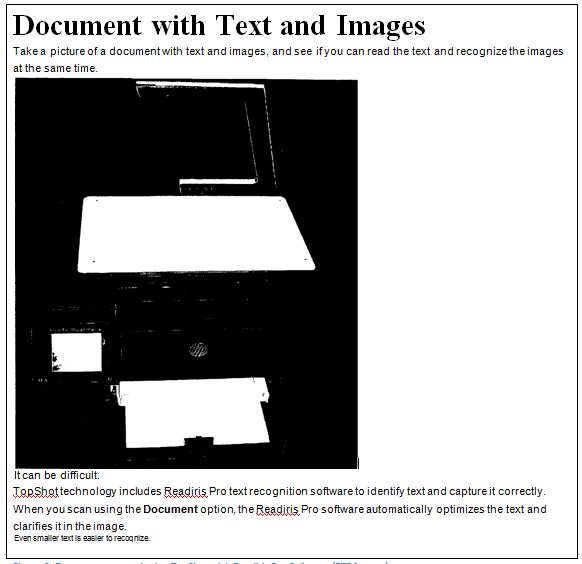

The TopShot camera is mounted on the end of an arm that the user must lift before scanning. The arm is designed to the optimal length for precise aiming and focusing of the camera. To ensure successful image capture, the camera arm has a detent that locks it into the fully lifted position, maintaining the necessary alignment.

The TopShot camera arm looks like a handle. It looks so much like a handle that one has to resist the temptation to lift the MFP with it. Because of this, the camera arm is designed to be light enough that it feels too weak to lift the device. The panel on the device where the camera is mounted is also designed to be flexible making it even more obvious that the camera arm is not a handle. This is why HP begins most of the user documentation with a warning to resist using the camera arm as a handle. Making the camera arm lighter also costs less, which reduces the cost of the MFP.
