= Eprint (disambiguation) =

Eprint may refer to:

- Eprint, a digital version of a research document
- EPrints, an Open source software for archiving research documents
- HP ePrint, a set of cloud printing technologies
- Preprint, an electronic copy of a research document before its formal publication
