= P3000 =

P3000 may stand for:

- HD Graphics P3000, integrated graphics processor
- HP LaserJet P3000 series of laser printers
- Huayun HY-P3000, a Chinese micro air vehicle
- Early prototype of the Heckler & Koch P30
