= HP LaserJet 2400 series =

Grayscale laser printer range

The HP LaserJet 2400 series was a line of grayscale laser printers sold by Hewlett-Packard. The printer was aimed at small and medium business use. It was the successor to the HP LaserJet 2300 series, and was in turn replaced by the HP LaserJet P3000 series.

== Models ==
The HP LaserJet 2400 series consists of the following models:

- HP LaserJet 2410
- HP LaserJet 2420
- HP LaserJet 2420n
- HP LaserJet 2420d
- HP LaserJet 2420dn
- HP LaserJet 2430t
- HP LaserJet 2430tn
- HP LaserJet 2430dtn

The letters at the end of the model have the following meaning:

- d - this model comes with an automatic duplexer
- t - this model comes with an additional tray
- n - this model comes with an internal 10/100 Ethernet JetDirect card

Models that have multiple letters will have all the options for those letters. For example, the LaserJet 2430dtn has a duplexer, and extra tray and an internal 10/100 Ethernet JetDirect card.

== Print speed ==
- 2410 : up to 25 ppm (letter) / 24 ppm (A4)
- 2420 : up to 30 ppm (letter) / 28 ppm (A4)
- 2430 : up to 35 ppm (letter) / 33 ppm (A4)

== See also ==
- List of Hewlett-Packard products
