= HP LaserJet 1020 =

Laser printer

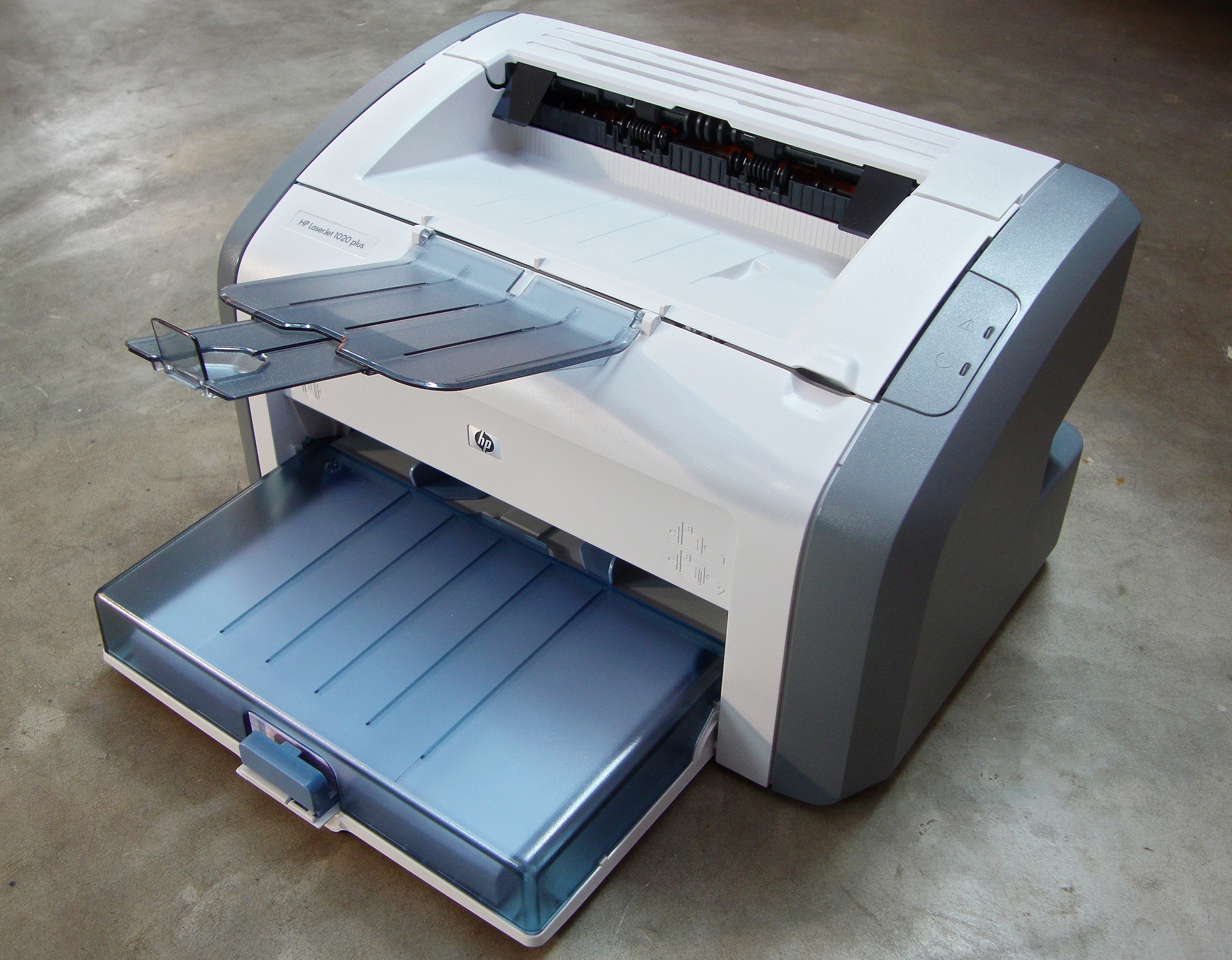
HP LaserJet 1020 plus laser printer

The HP LaserJet 1020 is a low cost, low volume, monochromatic laser printer. It was a replacement for the HP LaserJet 1012. The production started in June 2005.

== Specifications ==
In contrast to less compact, more powerful, laser printers, it only exposes ZjStream externally.

- Print speed, black (normal quality mode) – first page in less than 10 sec
- Printing up to 14 pages/minute
- Print quality 1200 dpi-like (600 dpi with FastRes)
- Processor speed – 234 MHz
- Memory – 2 MB of RAM
- USB 2.0
- Monthly duty cycle – 8,000 single-sided pages per month (maximum); 1,000 single-sided pages per month (average).

== Possible health issues ==
The LaserJet 1020 was studied to determine particulate emission and its potential effects on health. The 1020 was found to be a moderate emitter of particulates. A full copy of the report can be found here, whereas HP's response can be found here.

== Print cartridges ==
It uses a black toner print cartridge number Q2612A with 2,000-page capacity at the standard five percent coverage.
