= HP LaserJet 4 =

Group of monochrome laser printers

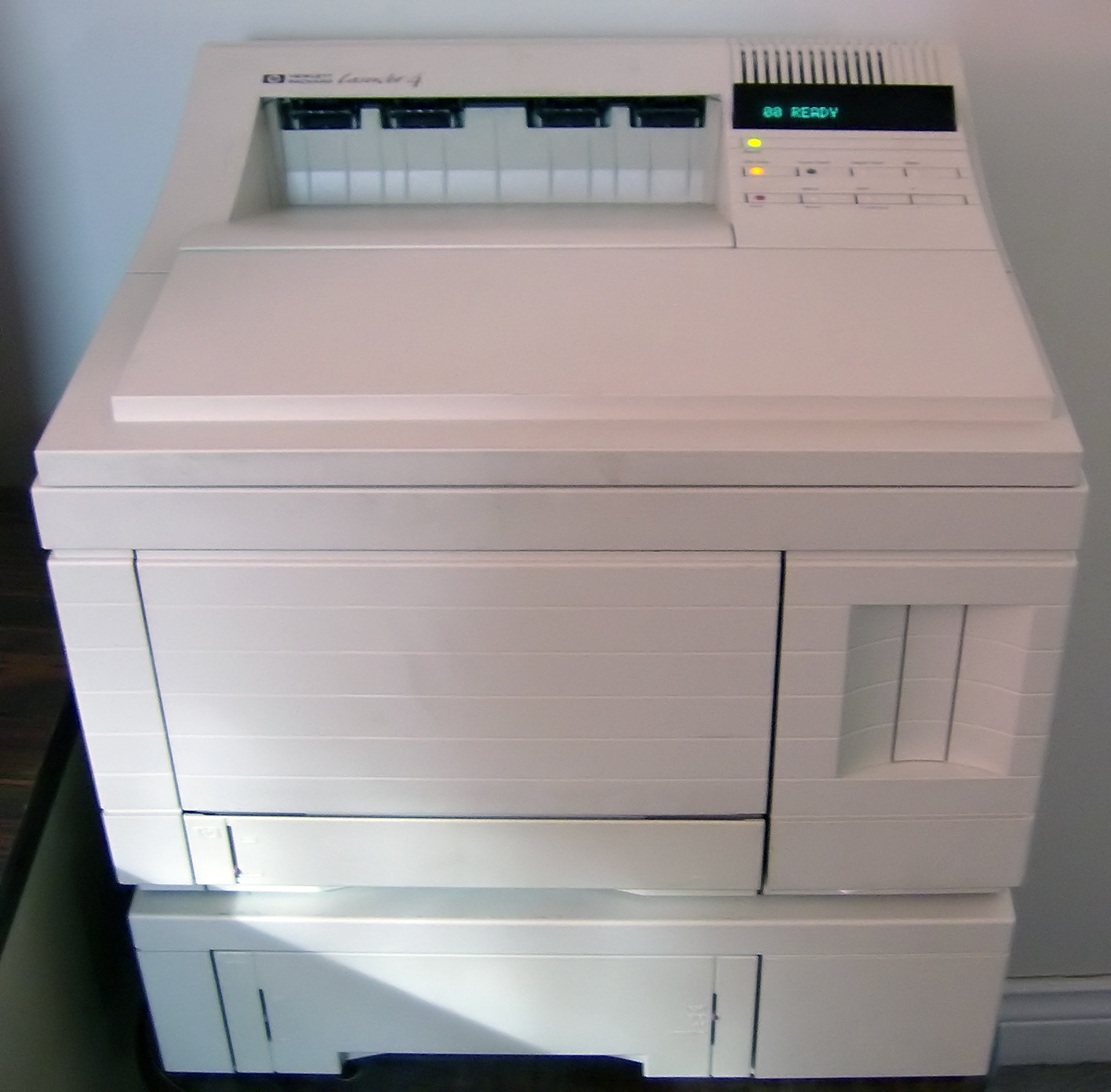
HP LaserJet 4

The HP LaserJet 4 (abbreviated sometimes to LJ4 or HP4) is a group of monochrome laser printers produced in the early to mid-1990s as part of the LaserJet series by Hewlett-Packard (HP). The 4 series has various models, including the standard LaserJet 4 for business use, the 4L for personal use and the 4P for small businesses. Additional models included the 4Si model, created as a heavy-duty business printer, and the 4V model, a B-size printer for desktop publishing and graphic artists. There are also PostScript variants of these machines with the '4M' designation, where M stands for, but is not limited to, usage with an Apple Macintosh. Hewlett-Packard also released an upgraded version of the LaserJet 4/4M known as the 4 Plus ('4+')/4M Plus ('4M+').

The LaserJet 4, especially the 4/4M/4+/4M+ models, have become known for their durability, mainly due to their reliable construction, as well as the printers built-in PCL (and optional PostScript) printer language support which is still used in computers to this day. Hewlett-Packard dominated the laser printing sector during this time in part due to their reliability, relatively affordable pricing, and the spread of LaserJet 4 models from personal use up to heavy business use.

The LaserJet 4 series was discontinued in the 1990s, and Hewlett-Packard recommended the HP LaserJet 5 series as a replacement for the 4 series. However, the driver for the HP LaserJet 4 exists in most, even older, software products and is a popular substitute driver for other PCL compatible printers.

== Common problems ==
The EX (and EX+) print engine is known for its reliability and longevity, and in comparison to earlier generations of laser printers, these machines have acquired a 'workhorse' reputation. The engine has a high monthly duty cycle (20,000 pages) and it is not uncommon to find units still functioning well after a million or more page impressions. However, any printer mechanism is subject to wear and degeneration, and typically printers still in use have now seen long service (the machine being discontinued with the introduction of the Laserjet 5 in 1995).

=== Exit path jams ===
Printers that exhibit the "accordion" or "washboard" paper jam problem with the paper tightly concertinaed or folded in the exit paper path (often behind the rear access door) generally have problems with the paper exit mechanism. In many cases, the delivery rollers (upper and lower) in the upper or final stage of the paper exit are worn or unserviceable. Replacement kits for these rollers are easily obtainable and can solve the problem. An alternative is to enlarge the roller slightly by using heat shrink over the output rollers. The heat shrink extra diameter pulls the paper quicker and resolves the wear/slip issues. Another alternative is to use coarse quality abrasive paper such as those used by belt sanders to roughen the surfaces of the rollers. A quality abrasive is needed to ensure no particles are shed into the mechanism.

== Models ==
=== 4/4M ===
Introduced in 1992, this is the original LaserJet 4 with the Canon EX laser print engine. It prints eight pages per minute, and the user cannot extend the feeders.

=== 4+/4M+ ===
The LaserJet 4 Plus (4+), released in 1994, was the LaserJet 4 with the improved Canon EX+ engine which increased printing speed to 12 PPM. This also provided the option for duplex printing (automatic double-sided printing) with the purchase of an accessory (HP part number C3157A). The original 20 MHz processor was also upgraded to 25 MHz, with the addition of Hewlett Packard's Memory Enhancement Technology. The printing mechanism was also improved to allow increased tones of grayscale.

These models also feature a 20-30W power saving (stand-by) mode, which was not included in the original Laserjet 4.

=== 4Si ===
The 4Si (and 4Si MX for the Macintosh) were heavy-duty business printers, produced using the Canon NX engine. The 4Si worked at 17 PPM, could print on paper up to 8.5"x14", and could be upgraded with a duplexing unit and an envelope feeder.

Besides the usual malfunctions common to laser printers with worn rollers or accumulated paper dust, older IIISi and 4Si printers eventually exhibit a "phantom paper jam." On longer documents, the printer will stop and report a paper jam, but with no visible reason why the paper was not feeding correctly. There are a couple of solenoids at the paper tray input mechanism that have felt pads designed to cushion them when they snap on, and the glue holding these pads in place can migrate to the surface. This delays the release of the solenoid, which causes the paper to start feeding slightly late. The error accumulates with each page printed, and eventually the paper is entering the mechanism so late that the printer believes that a jam has occurred. The tell-tale symptom is a print job with a top margin that shrinks from page to page. This problem is fixed by removing the felt pads, cleaning off the adhesive (isopropyl alcohol works well), and placing some electrical tape or other material to provide a cushion for the solenoid. Unfortunately, accessing the solenoids requires disassembling most of the input mechanism.

=== 4L and 4P ===
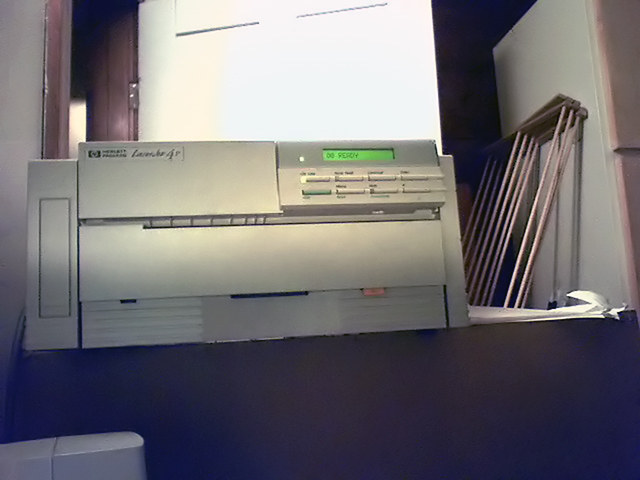
HP LaserJet 4P

The LaserJet 4 series had small printers in the range: the personal-use 4L and the small-business use 4P (and the Macintosh-compatible 4ML and 4MP). These printers both used the Canon PX engine, which like the EX was new at the time of release. The 4L used the 300 DPI PX engine, with the 4P using the upgraded 600 DPI PX-II engine. The 4L was the first LaserJet with power-saving technology that turned off the printer when not in use. The 4L is also notable in that it was the first LaserJet printer manufactured via "Mass Customization & Bulk Shipping", where the printer's circuit board, power cord and other final assembly items were assembled regionally, closer to the end-user. This saved the company millions in tariff and shipping costs as well as weeks in time-to-market. This process was used for low-end printers (4L, 4P, etc.), and initially in three regions: North America, Europe and Asia.

=== 4V ===
The 4V and 4MV were B-size printers for graphic artists using the Canon BX-II engine. Hewlett Packard did not consider the original BX engine as "good enough" for their LaserJet series. The 4V/4MV were released in 1994 and dominated the market due to their competitive price. The 4V series was the first HP printer to offer an internal hard disk option.

Common Fixes of the LaserJet 4V and 4MV model can have accordion jam as well, caused either by a worn roller or broken tooth on the gear at the fuser door. This can be repaired by replacement of the front fuser door. The engine over all is reliable. Problems such as paper jams can be fixed by replacement of pickup rollers located under the toner cartridge, replacement of the fuser door, checking if the paper separation paws are not bent, and replacement of the delivery rollers.

=== 4LC and 4LJ Pro ===
The 4LC and 4LJ Pro were printers based on the 4L platform modified for the Chinese and Japanese markets respectively. The 4LC was the "first printer designed exclusively for the Chinese market", and was released by HP in April 1995. This was followed by the Japanese 4LJ Pro in May 1995. Both of these printers used a 2 byte PCL that had been recently developed for Asian fonts, and came with memory upgrades and Chinese/Japanese fonts. Both printers worked at 600 DPI, with 2MB RAM.

=== Macintosh variants ===
In all the models of the four series an 'M' designation identifies a version designed to work well with the Apple Macintosh, with additional accessories for network connectivity (JetDirect (Ethernet)/LocalTalk), PostScript Level 2 support and more memory, built-in as standard.

=== Comparison ===
Comparison table of HP LaserJet 4 models
Model	Introduction	Canon print engine	Print resolution (DPI)	Print speed (PPM)	Standard memory (RAM in MB)	Maximum memory (RAM in MB)
4 (4M)	October 1992	EX	600	8	2 (6)	34 (26)
4Si (4Si MX)	April 1993	NX	600	17	2	34
4L (4ML)	May 1993	PX	300	4	1 (2)	2 (2)
4P (4MP)	October 1993	PX-II	600	4	2 (6)	26 (22)
4+ (4M+)	May 1994	EX+	600	12	2 (6)	66 (50)
4V (4MV)	September 1994	BX-II	600	16	4(12)	68(52)
4LC/4LJ Pro	April/May 1995	?	600	?	2	?

== Options ==
HP offered a font cartridges that is inserted in the front slot.

For multiuser usage, all models except the 4L have a slot in the back for a network card. There were several kinds from 10Mb ethernet only to ethernet, coax, and serial interface all in one card.

The printer has slots for two memory chips to speed up large print jobs.

== See also ==
- HP LaserJet 5
- PC Load Letter
