= Resolution enhancement technology =

Printing technology

Resolution enhancement technology (RET) is a form of image processing technology used to manipulate dot characteristics popular among laser printer and inkjet printer manufacturers. Closely related RET techniques are also used in VLSI photolithography manufacturing technology, in particular in relation to 90 nanometre technology.

Resolution refers to the sharpness of image detail, smoothness of curved lines, and the faithful reproduction of an image. In both cases, RET uses pre-compensation of the image in order to try to mitigate the effects of the printing process.

Among the major issues in RET in VLSI technology are the fundamental properties of a wave: amplitude, phase, and direction.

== See also ==
- Resolution enhancement technologies

== External reference ==
- Schellenberg, Franklin M. (May 28, 2004). Smith, Bruce W (ed.). "Resolution enhancement technology: the past, the present, and extensions for the future". Proc. SPIE 5377, Optical Microlithography XVII. Optical Microlithography XVII. 5377: 1. Bibcode:2004SPIE.5377....1S. doi:10.1117/12.548923. S2CID 110913847.
- "Calibre Computational Lithography". Mentor Graphics. Archived from the original on 2016-05-31.
- "Synopsys RTL-to-Silicon Solution". Archived from the original on 2008-11-21.
