= HP LaserJet P3000 series =

Series of black and white laser printers

The HP LaserJet P3000 series is a series of black and white laser printers printers for small to medium business use. Unveiled in October 2006, they are a direct replacement for the HP LaserJet 2400 series.

== Models ==
The HP LaserJet P3000 series consists of the following models:

- P3005 (Q7812A)
- P3005d (Q7813A)
- P3005n (Q7814A)
- P3005dn (Q7815A)
- P3005x (Q7816A)

The letters at the end of the model have the following meaning:

- d – this model comes with an automatic duplexer
- n – this model comes with an internal 10/100 BASE-T JetDirect card
- dn – this model comes with all the above
- x – this model comes with all the above plus an additional 500-sheet input tray

== See also ==
- LaserJet
- List of Hewlett-Packard products
