= HP LaserJet 5 =

Group of monochrome laser printers

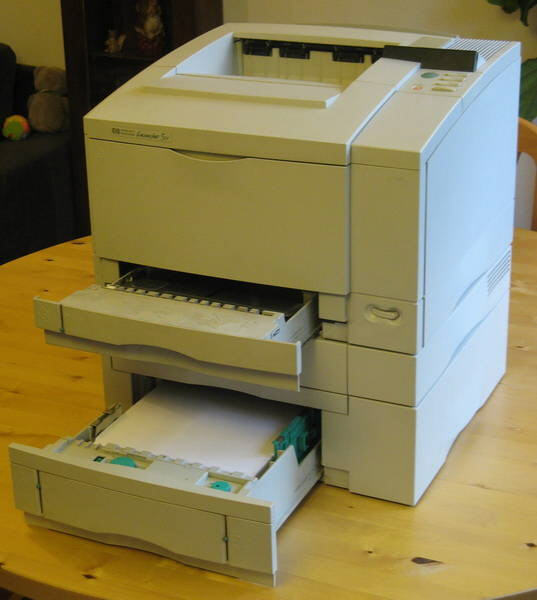
The HP Laserjet 5 with print server

The HP LaserJet 5 is a group of monochrome laser printers produced in the mid-1990s as part of the LaserJet series by Hewlett-Packard (HP). It is the successor to the HP LaserJet 4 series of printers. After the LaserJet 5 series, however, HP introduced a new naming convention for its LaserJet line. While the LaserJet 5L and 5P were replaced with the LaserJet 6L and 6P, there was never a LaserJet 6 proper; the successor to the LaserJet 5/5M/5N/5se line was the LaserJet 4000 series, and the successor to the LaserJet 5si/5siMX/5siNX was the LaserJet 8000 series. In addition, the LaserJet 4V/4MV was not succeeded by a LaserJet 5 series printer, as its successor was the LaserJet 5000 series.

== LaserJet 5 range ==
Comparison table of HP LaserJet 5 models
Model	Introduction	Canon print engine	Print resolution (DPI)	Print speed (PPM)	Standard memory (RAM in MB)	Maximum memory (RAM in MB)
5P/5MP	March 1995	VX	600	6	2/3	50/35
5L (Note: The 5L Extra, release in July 1996, was a standard 5L combined with a software bundle)	September 1995	AX	600	4	1	9
5Si (5Si MX)	November 1995	WX (24PPM)	600	24	4/12	132/76
5/5N/5M	April 1996	EX-II	600	12	2/4/6	66/66/52
5Si Mopier	November 1996	WX (24PPM)	600	24	12	76
5Si NX	December 1996	WX (24PPM)	600	24	4	132
