= HP ePrint =

Electronic printing technologies by Hewlett-Packard

HP ePrint was a term used by Hewlett-Packard to describe a variety of printing technologies developed for mobile computing devices, such as smartphones, tablet computers, and laptops.

HP discontinued ePrint on models released after fall of 2020.

Many HP ePrint technologies use cloud resources to provide mobile printing capabilities for specific HP ePrint-enabled printers and MFPs and for other printers using applications that provide network printing. The HP ePrint portfolio includes the following:

== HP ePrint via Email ==

HP ePrint via Email is a feature that most HP printers and MFPs use. HP ePrint enables printing documents attached to email messages sent to the device. The HP ePrint-capable printer or MFP must be registered to an HP ePrint cloud service called HP ePrint Center, which assigns a unique email address to the printer or MFP. The assigned email address is customizable but by default is arbitrarily set to promote security since only those who know the email address can use it to print. HP ePrint via Email does not require a print driver installed on the client. The HP ePrint public cloud renders the printing data from each separate attachment into a suitable print data stream, such as PCL3, PCL 5, or PostScript, and, subsequently, sends it to the HP ePrint-enabled printer. For this to work, the attachments for printing must be in a native plain format, such as any of the following:

- MS Word document
- MS PowerPoint presentation
- MS Outlook document
- Google Doc document
- Google Slide presentation
- Google Gmail document
- Image file (JPEG, BMP, GIF, PNG, TIFF)
- Adobe Acrobat file (PDFs)
- Text file and Rich Text Format (RTF)
- HTML file

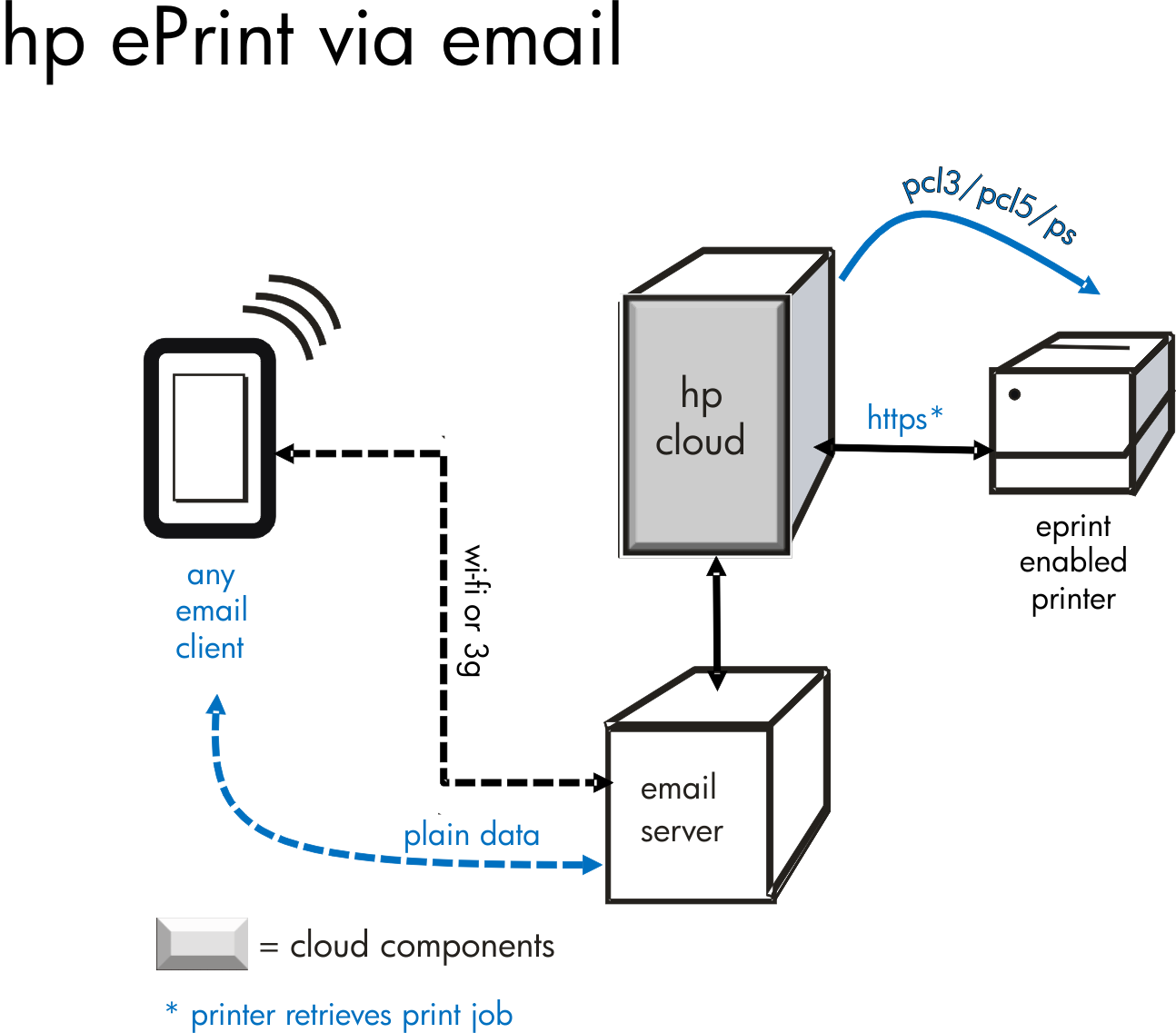
HP ePrint data flow

Any email-capable client, including a smartphone, a tablet computer, a laptop, or any other email client, can submit print jobs to HP ePrint via email. Registered users can also log into the HP ePrint Centre to manage and view their print jobs, printers, and settings. For example, HP ePrint Centre provides options to create lists of users approved to print, and it includes spam filters to prevent unwanted print requests. Users can also change the email address of the HP ePrint-enabled printer or MFP by requesting a new one (each HP ePrint email address must be unique and thus, must be approved). Figure 1 shows how data flows from the email client to the HP ePrint public cloud server (HP ePrint Centre) for rendering into an acceptable print stream format and then forwarded to the HP ePrint-enabled printer or MFP.

== HP ePrint Public Print Locations ==
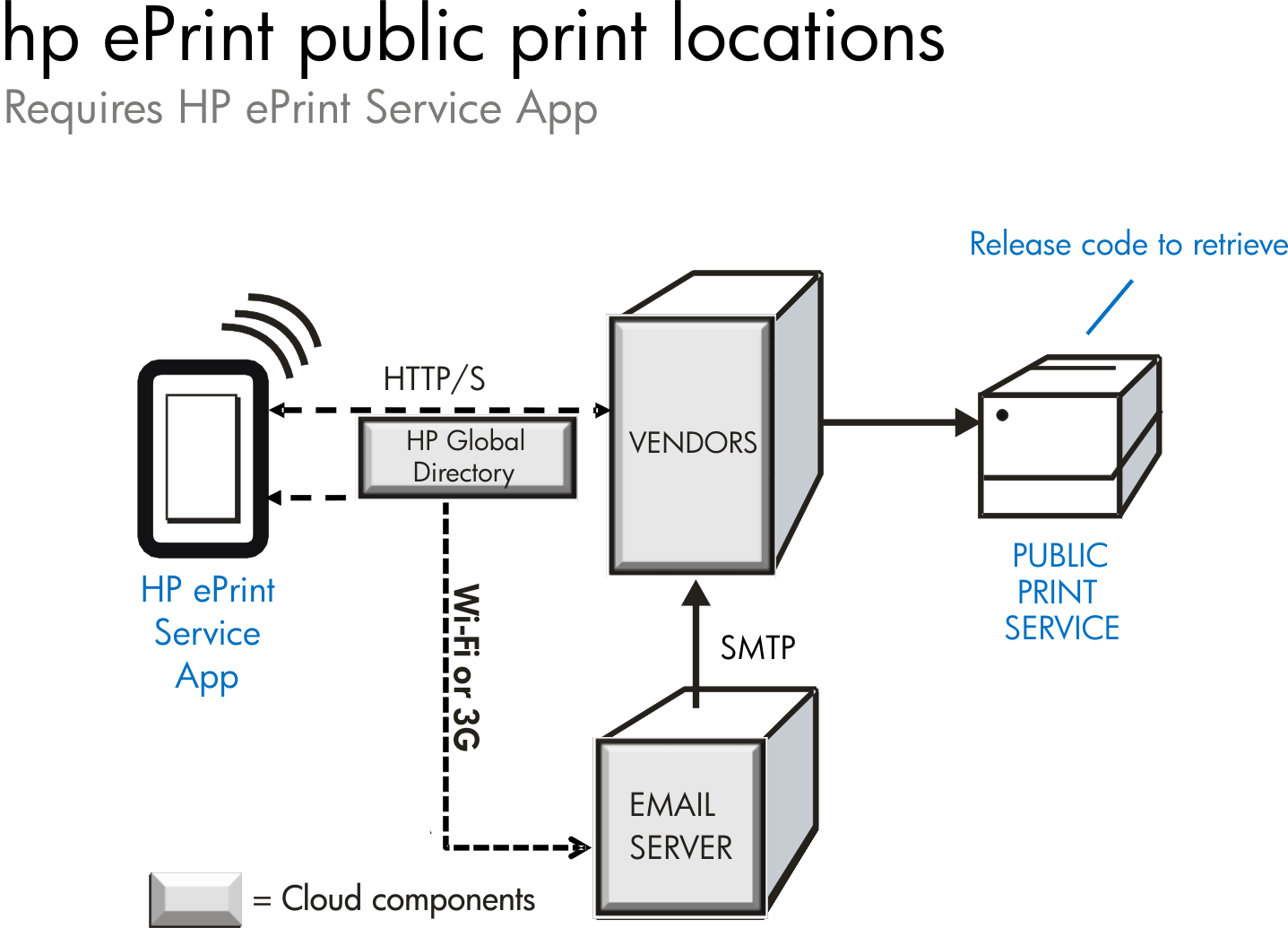
HP ePrint Public Print Locations data flow

HP ePrint Public Print Locations is a mobile printing service that prints from the cloud using one of the HP ePrint mobile device apps. HP ePrint Public Print Locations is meant for people who use printers while travelling. It also enables a business or a public facility to charge for printing. For example, a business person preparing for a presentation can print handouts at a destination hotel for a fee rather than carrying them as they travel, or a traveller can print a boarding pass at a hotel to save waiting in line at the airport.

The HP ePrint apps are free and include versions for Apple iPhones and Android devices. Users can find it at the iTunes App Store or Google Play. It is also available for Blackberry mobile devices from BlackBerry App World. The HP ePrint app lists various registered HP ePrint public printers at locations, such as hotels, airports, and print shops.

When a user submits a print job to HP ePrint Public Print Locations, the service returns a notification email message with an authorisation code that is required for printing at the device. This authorisation code prevents unwanted printing and depending on the business model enables the owner of the printer to charge for printing before the documents are printed.

The HP ePrint Service app uses GPS coordinates to locate and map HP ePrint public printers nearby. The user can use smartphone navigation features for directions to the location of the HP ePrint Public Print Location.

HP ePrint Public Print Locations supports the following file formats for printing:

- Microsoft Office (’95-2010) Word, Excel, PowerPoint
- Microsoft Visio
- OpenOffice.org (2.X/3.X)
- StarOffice (StarWriter, StarCalc, StarChart, StarDraw, StarImpress)
- Adobe Acrobat (PDF)
- Text and Rich Text Format
- Image files (PNG, BMP, JPEG, GIF, TIFF)

The HP ePrint Public Print Locations service maintains a database of public print providers. Each provider, upon receiving a print request, renders the print data accordingly and sends the print data stream (PCL or Postscript) to a destination print queue. To retrieve the print job, the user goes to the printer location kiosk and types the authorisation code to release and print the print job(s).

== HP ePrint Enterprise ==
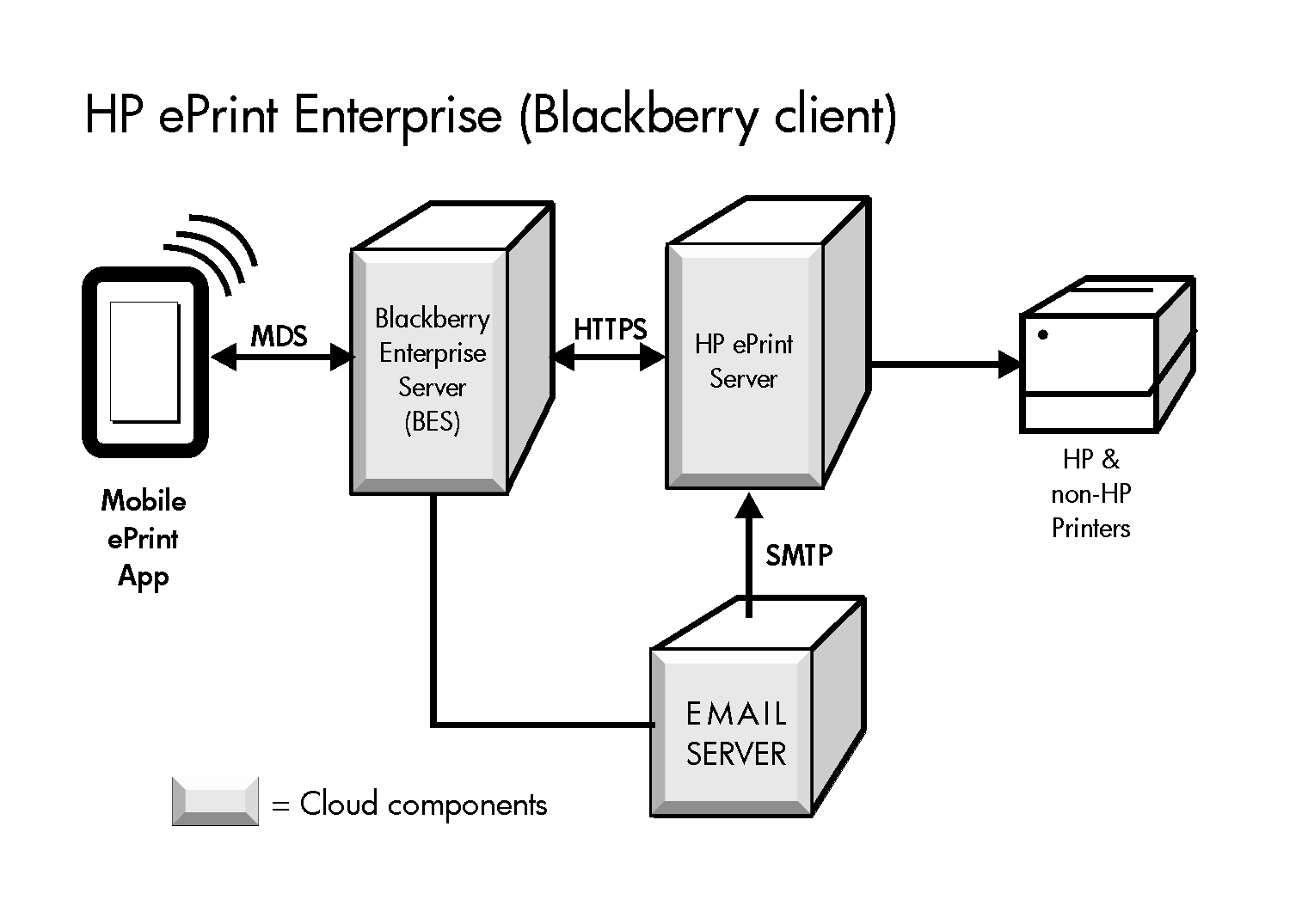
Blackberry data flow

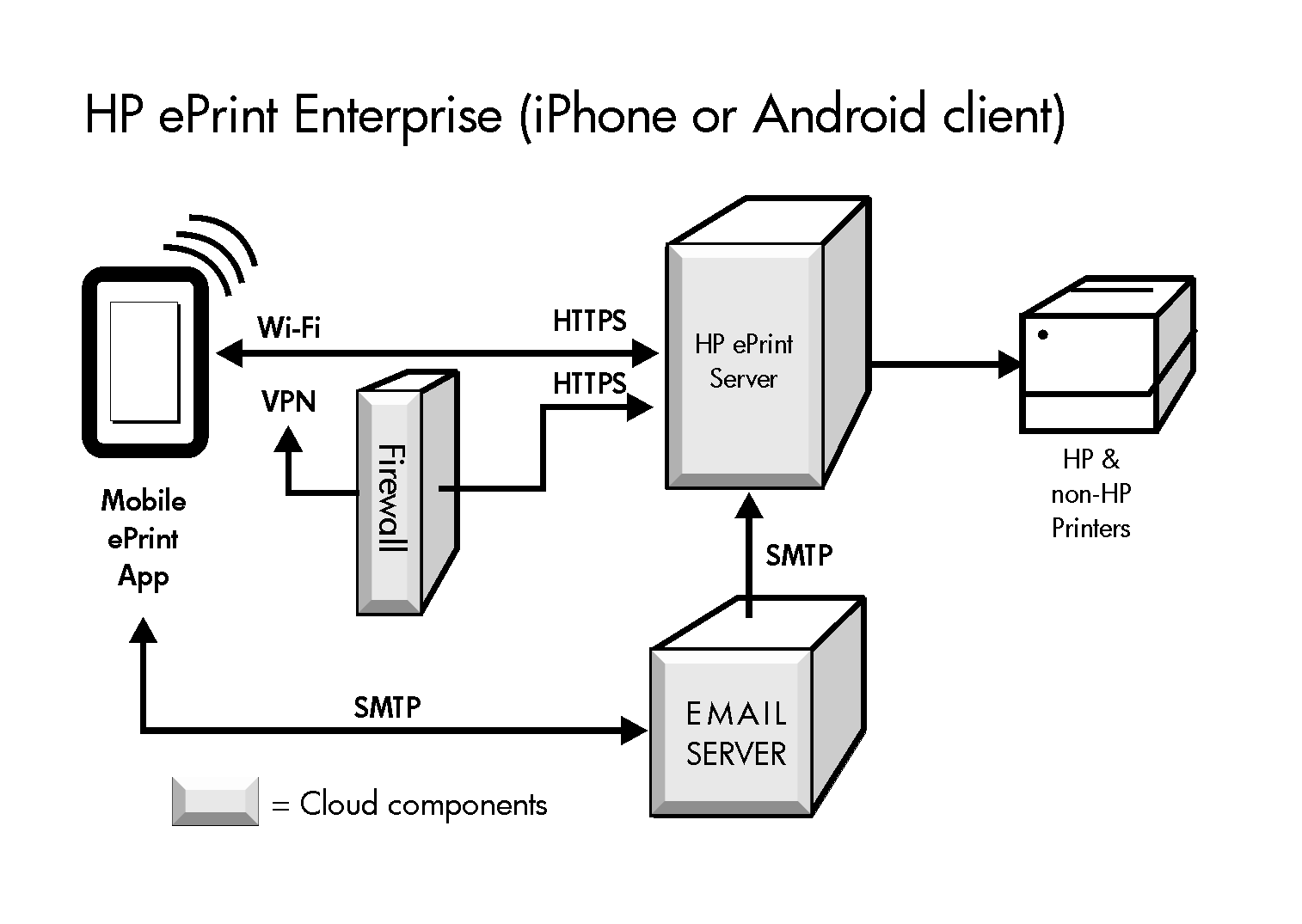
iOS and Android data flow

HP ePrint Enterprise is for use in large networks, such as those in SMB, large corporations, or academic environments where IT departments can manage private cloud services. It provides a mobile printing option for people, such as mobile workers, who travel from office to office and need printing at remote locations. HP ePrint Enterprise also supports direct email printing from a corporate email service to HP and non-HP printers and MFPs.

The HP ePrint Enterprise (service) app enables users to submit print jobs to private company printers or to public print locations. The user must be registered with the company’s HP ePrint Enterprise server to view the company’s private printers in the HP ePrint Enterprise (service) app.

The HP ePrint Enterprise server is an ASP.NET application that is supported on Windows Server 2003/2008. It can send print jobs to any network-connected printer capable of PS, PCL5, or PC3-GUI language support. The following are system requirements for the HP ePrint Enterprise server application:

- Windows Server 2003 or 2008 R2 (32 or 64 bit)
- Microsoft Internet Information Services (IIS)
- Microsoft SMTP server
- Microsoft Message Queuing (MSMQ)
- Microsoft Office (full installation)
- Microsoft Windows Installer
- Office Primary Interop Assemblies (PIA)
- Microsoft .NET Framework (3.5)
- Microsoft SQL Server 2008 (or Express)

The method of sending data to the printer or MFP depends on the type of mobile device in use (i.e. Android, iOS, or BlackBerry). Android and iOS mobile devices use a direct connection to the HP ePrint Enterprise server. BlackBerry devices access the HP ePrint Enterprise network resources indirectly via the BlackBerry Enterprise Server (BES).

HP ePrint Enterprise is scalable to adapt to varying workloads. It can operate in a master/slave configuration where the slave server handles the primary workload while the master server handles backup and redundancy. The master server dispatches print jobs to appropriate slave servers. As the workload increases, additional slave servers can be deployed. A large geographically dispersed company can have the master server as the primary point of communication at corporate headquarters and slave servers at local sites. These reliability and scalability features are essential for successful cloud computing architectures.

HP ePrint Enterprise supports the following plain data file formats for printing:

- MS Word (2007) document
- MS PowerPoint presentation
- MS Outlook
- Image file (JPEG, BMP, GIF, PNG, TIFF)
- Adobe Acrobat files (PDF)
- Text file and Rich Text Format (RTF)
- HTML file

The HP ePrint Enterprise server accepts print jobs using two primary protocols: http/https and SMTP. Once the HP ePrint Enterprise private cloud printing service accepts a print job message, it converts the print job into an appropriate printer language (PCL or Postscript) via an internal rendering process and submits it to the printer or MFP via TCP port 9100. HP ePrint Enterprise server is capable of processing multiple print jobs simultaneously by using a message queue service with the ability to track the progress of each individual print job.

HP ePrint Enterprise server has a web-based administration console, which any authorised user can access using a Web browser. This console provides settings for adding and managing users and print devices, configuring server settings, performing simple diagnostics, and tracking events.

HP ePrint Enterprise can be configured for guest user access too. This enables users outside the company to remotely print to company devices. Guest users are given access for 30 days by default. An administrator can change the access period to any time value and/or revoke access at any time.

HP ePrint Enterprise administrators can limit printing access to company devices by user (guest or regular) as needed.

== HP ePrint Wireless Direct Printing ==
HP ePrint Wireless Direct Printing is a feature of some HP printers and MFPs that connects directly to mobile devices for printing. It requires the mobile device to have a compatible app that can print:

- Apple AirPrint (standard on iOS version 4.2 or later)
- HP ePrint
- Any other app that can send a print job

An HP printer or MFP that has the HP ePrint Wireless Direct Printing feature behaves as a wireless access point where the mobile device connects as though it were on any wireless network. Once the device is connected, the user can print from any app that has printing options.

iOS (4.2 or later) includes Apple Airprint, and can print using HP ePrint Wireless Direct Printing once the mobile device is connected to the printing device wireless access point. Android and other platforms can connect to an HP ePrint Wireless Direct printing device, but can print only with supported apps such as HP ePrint.

== Apple AirPrint ==
Apple AirPrint is a mobile print subsystem with iOS 4.2 and later (for iPhone, iPad, and iPod touch) that can find available printers and send the print jobs. Apple Inc. and HP collaborated to develop Apple AirPrint which enables iOS devices to print to many HP-branded printers. However, since its introduction, many other printer manufacturers are also producing compatible printers.

Apple AirPrint creates a PDF internally, an HP filter (pdftopcl) then renders the PDF into PCL data that the printer can process, and finally, the printer prints it. Apple AirPrint begins when the user selects the Action button and chooses the Print option. Apple AirPrint searches the network for available printers using the mDNS network protocol. It filters the list of printers it finds and displays only the compatible printers.

== HP ePrint Mobile apps ==
A screenshot of the HP ePrint Android app homescreen.

HP ePrint includes three mobile printing apps:

- HP Smart (iOS)
- ePrint Smart HPrinter Service (Android)
- HP ePrint (Android, iOS and BlackBerry)
- HP ePrint Enterprise (service) (Android, iOS and Blackberry)
- HP Designjet ePrint and Share

== HP ePrint Software ==
HP ePrint Software (formerly HP ePrint Mobile Print Driver) is a mobile print driver for Windows or Macintosh computers. It supports cloud printing, HP ePrint Wireless Direct printing, and local area network (LAN) direct printing from any application to any HP printer or HP ePrint Public Printing Locations. It provides mobile printing features including searching for and connecting to compatible printers, duplex printing, and multiple pages per sheet. It also can print directly to network connected HP Postscript printing devices.
