= HP LaserJet 2300 series =

Line of grayscale laser printers

The Laserjet 2300 series was a line of grayscale laser printers sold by Hewlett-Packard. The printer was aimed at small and medium business use. The printer utilizes DRAM memory technology and uses 32 MB standard memory, which is expandable to 288 MB. It is compatible with Microsoft Windows and Macintosh Operating System.

== Variations ==
The 2300 Series came in several configurations and variations:

- LaserJet 2300

Standard model.

- LaserJet 2300d

Able to perform automatic duplex printing.

- Laserjet 2300n

Fitted with a 10/100 Ethernet port, for networking.

- Laserjet 2300dn

Able to duplex automatically and was fitted with a 10/100 Ethernet port.

- LaserJet 2300L

A lower cost version with a lower print speed of 20 pages per minute.

- LaserJet 2300dtn

A combination of the 2300d, 2300n, and with a third tray as standard.

== Computer Operating Systems ==
- Microsoft Windows Millennium Edition
- Unix, Microsoft Windows 2000
- Microsoft Windows 95
- IBM OS/2
- Microsoft Windows NT
- Microsoft Windows 98
- Linux
- Microsoft Windows XP Professional
- Apple Mac OS 8
- Microsoft Windows XP Home
- Apple Mac OS 9
- Apple Mac OS X
