= Compaq Presario =

Discontinued line of computers produced by Compaq

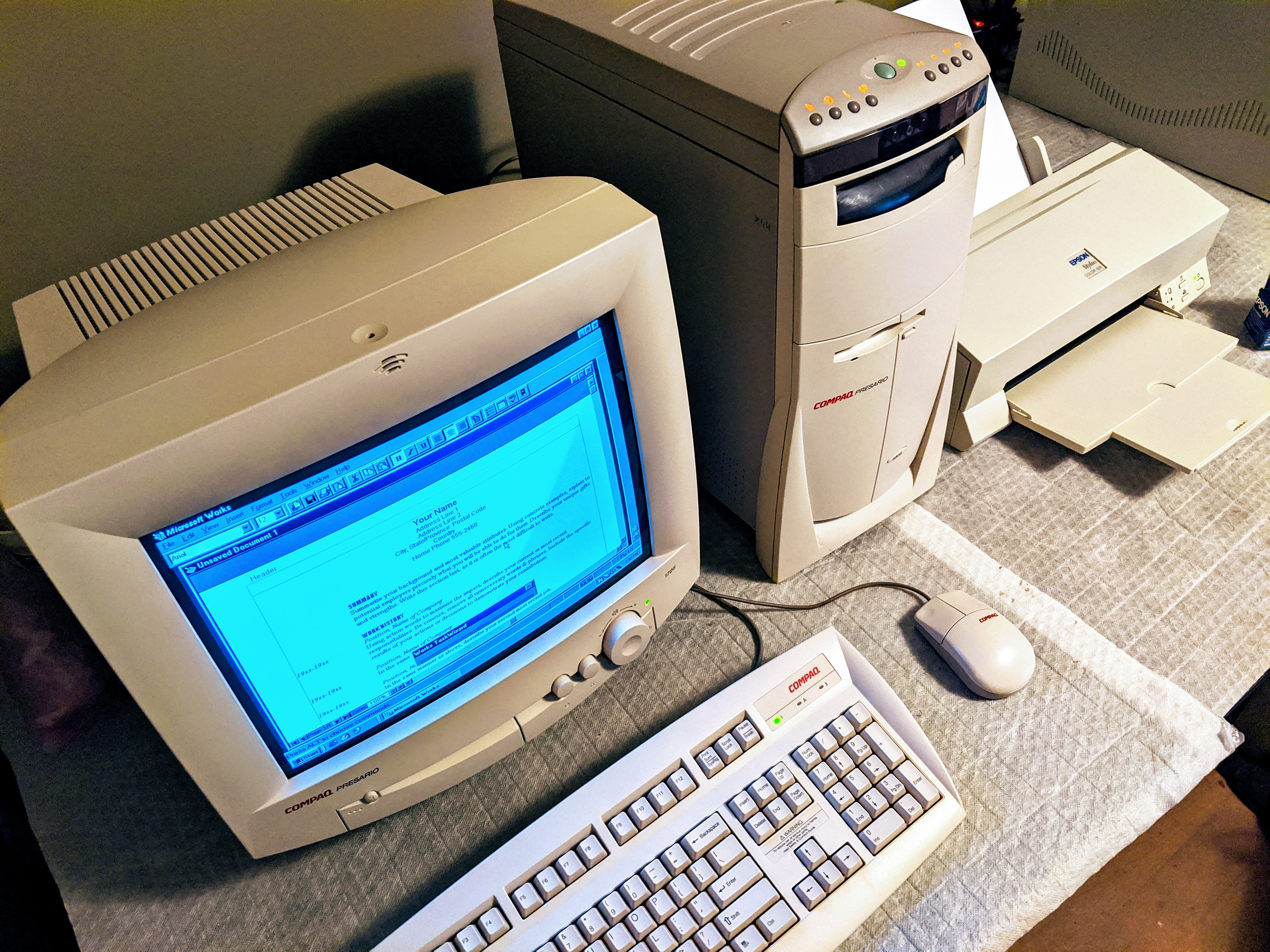
- Compaq Presario 4808 (1997)
- Developer: Compaq (1993–2002); Hewlett-Packard (2002–2013)
- Manufacturer: Compaq (1993–2002); Hewlett-Packard (2002–2013)
- Type: Personal computers
- Released: August 1993; 33 years ago
- Lifespan: 1993–2013
- Discontinued: 2013; 13 years ago
- Operating system: MS-DOS, Windows
- CPU: AMD, Intel, Cyrix
- Graphics: PowerVR, ATI (AMD), Nvidia
- Marketing target: Consumer
- Predecessor: HP OmniBook (business notebooks)
- Successor: HP Pavilion

Presario is a discontinued line of consumer-oriented personal computers originally produced by Compaq and later by Hewlett-Packard following the 2002 merger. Introduced in 1993, Compaq has used the name for desktops, laptops, all-in-ones and monitors for home and home office use.

After acquiring Compaq in 2002, HP sold both HP- and Compaq-branded machines under the Pavilion and Presario names respectively from 2002 to 2013.

== History ==
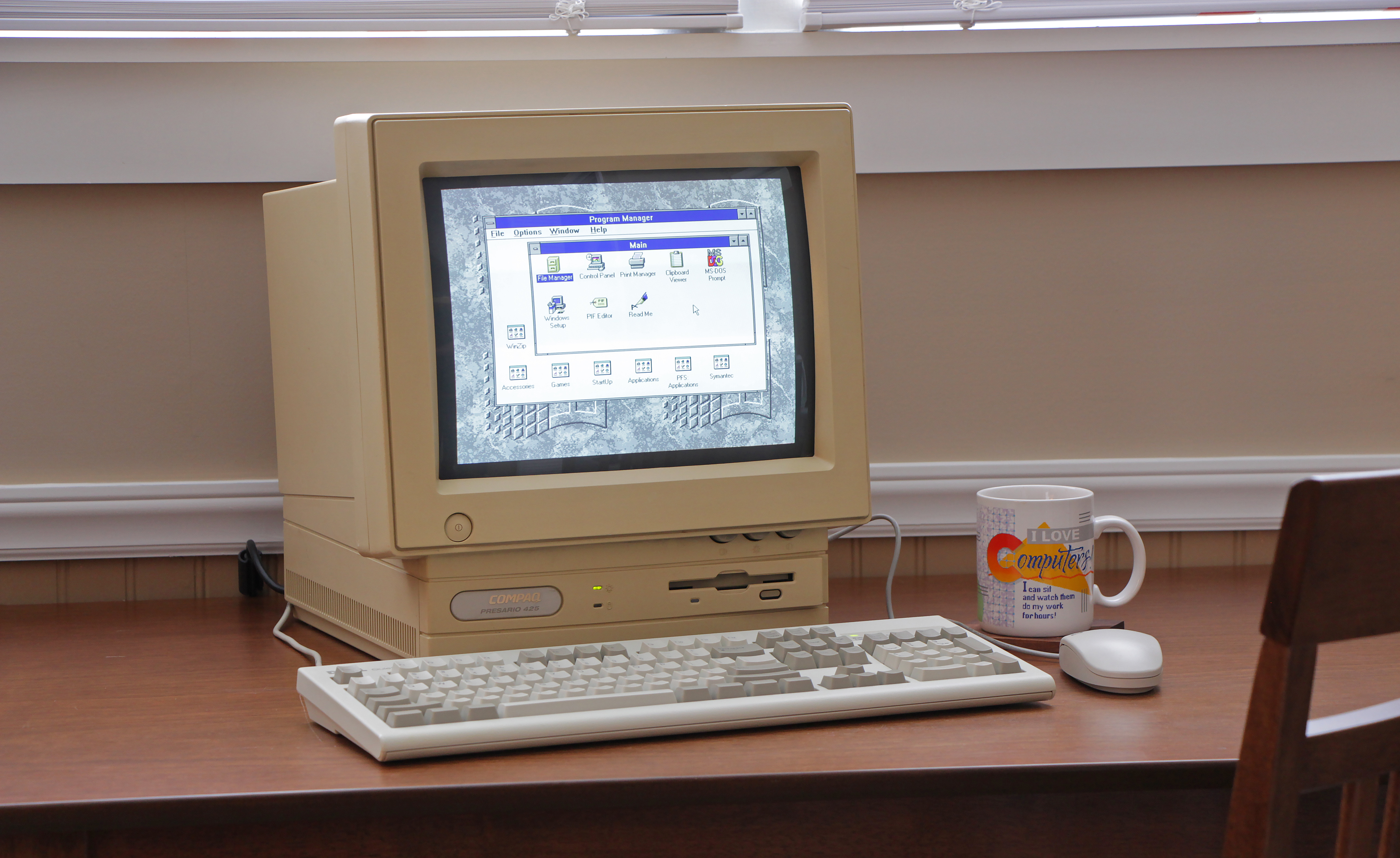
Compaq Presario 425 all-in-one (1993)

On August 26, 1993, Compaq introduced the Compaq Presario brand of IBM PC compatible computers as the company's first foray into the retail computer market with the release of the all-in-one 400 series, which later expanded with the horizontal desktop 600 series and the tower-based 800 series in November 1993. They became one of the first manufacturers of the 1990s to market a sub-$1000 computer, as well as the first major computer manufacturer to utilize CPUs from AMD (which began supplying CPUs to Compaq in early 1994) and Cyrix in order to maintain the prices they wanted.

The Presario brand has gone through a number of iterations over the years, with five generations (or "Series") of computers being produced by Compaq prior to its acquisition by HP in 2002. These generations include new computer models at the time of introduction, design changes to the desktop and tower cases for each series of computers, and utilized several generations of Intel and AMD processors (with Cyrix processors being offered up until the late-1990s), as well as featuring new hardware at the time of each generation. In the mid-1990s, Compaq began manufacturing PC monitors under the Presario brand to complement other monitors made and offered by Compaq at that time. From 1993 to 1998, a series of all-in-one units, containing both the PC and the monitor in the same case, were also released. The first laptop and notebook computers in the Presario family came to the market in 1996.

In May 2002, Hewlett-Packard (HP), a former information technology company known for their line of personal computers such as the Pavilion among others, acquired Compaq that year. At this time, the Presario brand name would be repurposed for a line of low-end home desktops and laptops made by HP under the Compaq brand name as part of HP's strategy to use the Compaq brand for its consumer and budget-oriented products, being sold concurrently with HP's other products. The Presario line of laptops also replaced the then-discontinued OmniBook line of business notebooks that same year, with the name returning 22 years later as a line of consumer-oriented laptops with AI technology as part of HP's restructuring of its consumer products in 2024. The Presario line of computers would continue to be produced for a few more years up until the Compaq brand name was quietly discontinued by HP in 2013. (Note: It has been said that the Compaq brand name was discontinued in 2013 due to "marketability issues", however this has not been officially confirmed as such by HP.)

=== Timeline of models ===
Over five generations (or "Series") of computers produced by Compaq under the Compaq Presario brand were made prior to being acquired by HP in 2002.

==== Initial lineup (1993) ====
The Compaq Presario brand was launched with the Compaq Presario 425 (as part of the 400 series) on August 26, 1993, with the 600 and 800 series later coming to the market that year in November. Designed for ease-of-use, the first computers of the Presario brand included i486 processors from either Intel, AMD, or Cyrix, 4–8 MB of RAM, on board video display controllers, 200–340 MB hard disk drives, a floppy disk drive, a built-in V.32 modem, and came shipped with MS-DOS 6.x and Windows 3.1x preinstalled, with additional software included such as TabWorks. The 400 series came with a built-in 14-inch (36 cm) cathode ray tube (CRT) display, while the 600 and 800 series came with an additional configuration known as the "CDS", which includes a CD-ROM drive and an additional Sound Blaster 16 sound card as standard, in addition to all of the features of their non-CDS counterparts.

These computers were superseded by the next series of computers that were introduced in the Presario brand in 1994, and these computers became part of the first generation of Presario computers otherwise known as "Series 1", which were produced from 1993 to 1996.

==== "Series 1" (1993–1996) ====
On September 14, 1994, the Compaq Presario lineup was expanded to include the 500, 700, and 900 series (and later the 5500, 7100, 7200, 9200, 9500, and 9600 series between 1995 and 1996). Together with the initial lineup from 1993, this makes up the first generation of Presario computers known as "Series 1", which were produced from 1993 to 1996.

The new models contained minor cosmetic changes to the case designs and used either i486 or Pentium (and Pentium-compatible) processors, and initially came shipped with MS-DOS 6.x and Windows 3.1x preinstalled. Later models from August 1995 onwards were shipped with Windows 95 as part of Compaq's role in the launch of Microsoft's then-new operating system at the time. "CDS" configurations continued to be offered in some models, including a CD-ROM drive and a Sound Blaster 16 sound card as standard. Later models produced after September 1995 came with a CD-ROM drive and sound card as standard equipment, making the "CDS" configuration redundant and was removed shortly thereafter.

==== "Series 2" (1996–1998) ====
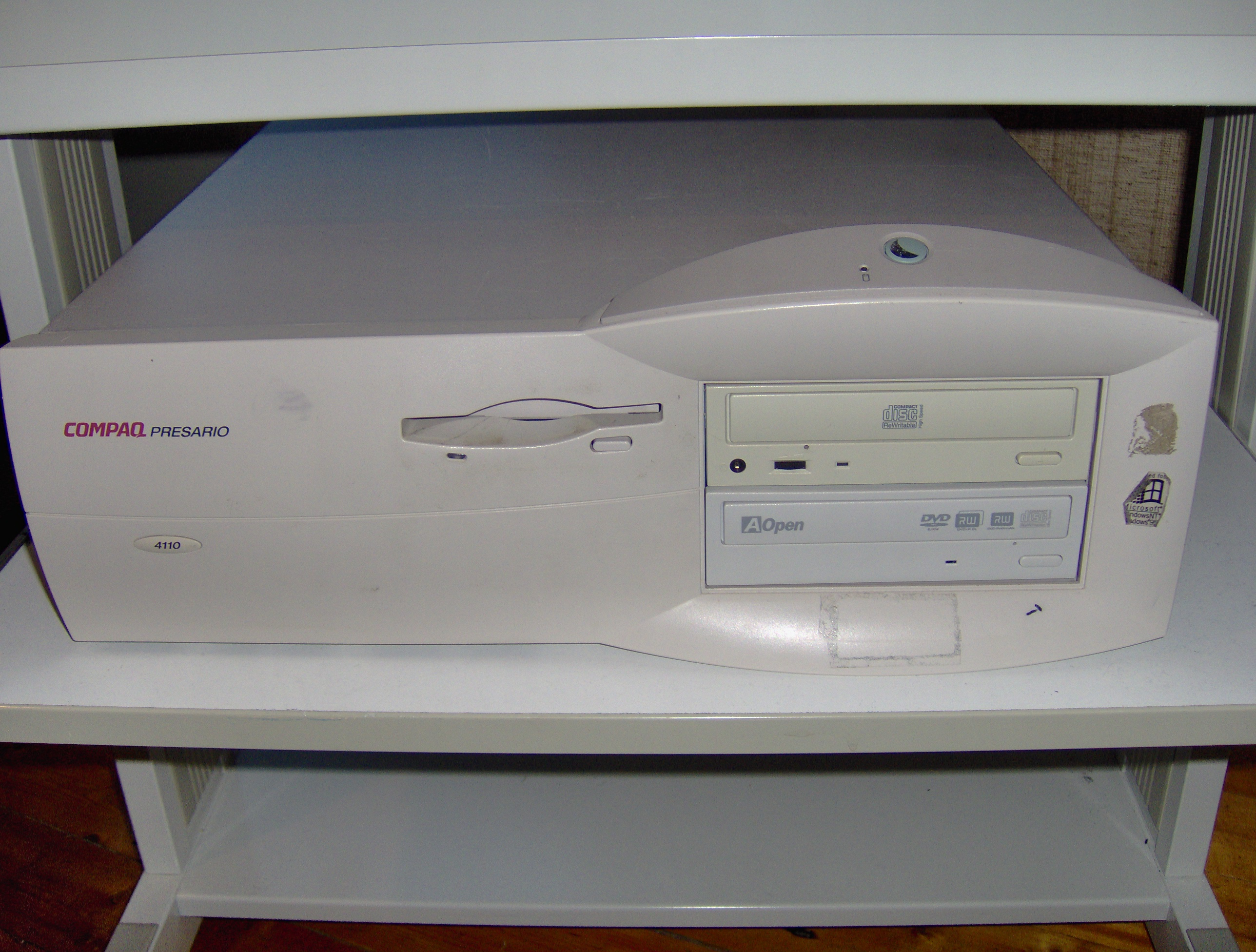
Compaq Presario 4110 (1996)

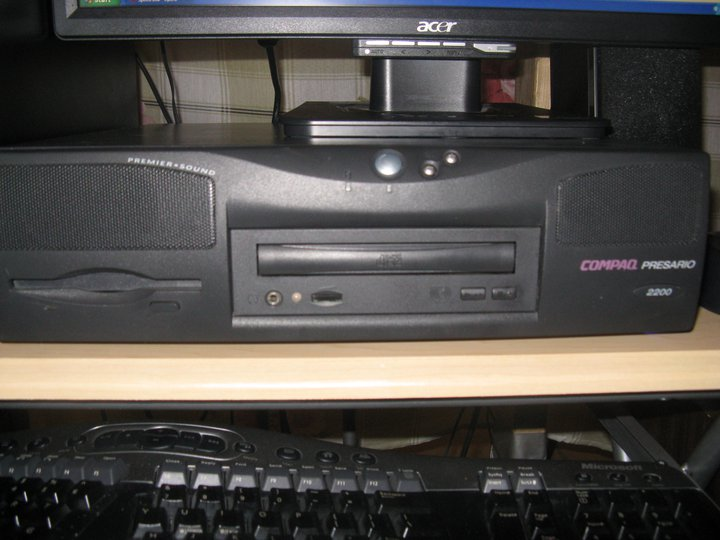
Compaq Presario 2200 desktop (1997) — the first model of the 2200 series

In 1996, a new lineup of Presario computers featuring all-new case designs were introduced, beginning the second generation of Presario computers produced from 1996 to 1998, also known as "Series 2". They were first announced on July 15, 1996, and initially consisted of the 4000, 6000 and 8000 series, including a series of unique all-in-one models known as the 3000 series. Later models released from 1997 onwards include the 2000 series. Models produced during this period include the 2200, 3020, 4100, 4400, 4500, 4600, 4700, 4800, 6700, and 8700 series. This was the last generation of computers made by Compaq in the Presario family to offer all-in-one form factors for desktop computers.

These new models moved away from the boxy form factors of "Series 1" Presario computers in favor of brand-new designs. Initial models used a case design that had a beveled concave shape surrounding the exposed drive bays, while later models used a well-known spaceship (or rocket ship) form factor for the towers with smoked-black CD bezel covers; the latter design would be used for several years (with minor updates) until the introduction of "Series 5" Presario computers in mid-2000. In both case styles, the towers also featured a set of buttons located on the top of the case known as the Easy Access Buttons, introduced during this generation. Pentium and AMD K5–K6 processors were offered during this generation, with some models featuring Cyrix processors, and the i486 processor was dropped from the lineup. Discrete graphics card options were available in some models via PCI, and certain models also featured PowerVR graphics accelerator cards supplied by VideoLogic (now Imagination Technologies) using the Midas3 graphics chip. These models came shipped with Windows 95 preinstalled, usually OSR2 and OSR2.5 depending on the time of manufacture.

The first Compaq Presario laptops and notebooks arrived at the start of this generation, consisting of the 1000 series of notebook computers. They were the company's first laptop/notebook models designed exclusively for the home market. These models came with Pentium processors, a hard disk drive, a CD-ROM drive, a floppy disk drive, a built-in modem, one or two PC Card slots, a built-in 11.3-inch (29 cm) viewable liquid crystal display (LCD) and integrated speakers.

Most models of this series were discontinued at the start of the "Series 3" generation in 1998, however the 2000 series (especially the 2200 series) continued to be produced outside of the generation it was introduced due to its popularity, with various models of the series being produced until 1999. The last models of the Presario lineup to use the "Series 2" design were the Presario 2254, 2255, and 2256 desktop computers in 1998, which removed the remaining Easy Access Buttons located on the top of the case but retaining only the sleep button. The 2000 series would be completely redesigned in late 1998 with the release of the Presario 2266 desktop computer that year.

==== "Series 3" (1998–1999) ====
The Compaq Presario lineup was updated in 1998 with several new models, starting the third generation of Presario computers, also known as "Series 3". First announced on June 9, 1998, models produced were the 5000, 5100, 5200, 5400, and 5600 series. All-in-one form factors were no longer produced; most models during this generation were produced exclusively in tower form factors, with some models using horizontal desktop form factors such as the Presario 2254, 2255, and 2256 desktop computers from the previous "Series 2" generation (Note: Even though the Compaq Presario 2254, 2255, and 2256 desktop computers were introduced during the "Series 3" generation, they were technically based on the previous "Series 2" generation of computers as it uses the same design language as the "Series 2" Presario computers with some minor changes.) as well as the newly redesigned Presario 2266 model in 1998 and the Presario 2286 and 2288 models in 1999. These models also came about at a time when the Internet was growing in popularity and usage during the late-1990s; as such, this generation of Presario computers were labeled as "Compaq Presario Internet PCs" to reflect that notion, and were marketed to provide the user the best Internet computing experience as possible with easier and affordable options for Web access and new integrated technologies designed for faster Internet access. It was also the first generation to introduce build-to-order models for certain series of Presario computers (i.e. the 5600 desktop series and the 1600 laptop/notebook series) under its "Built For You" program, which can be acquired via kiosks (under the name of "Custom PC Center") or on Compaq's website.

The spaceship design of the "Series 2" Presario computers was retained in this generation, albeit with a slightly squatter design that was more rounded. Some models (including higher-end models) housed in taller cases featured smoked-black plastic "easy access" flip-up doors on the bottom containing USB, audio and/or game ports behind it. The Easy Access Buttons located on the top of the cases from "Series 2" Presario computers were also removed. New processor models were introduced, namely the Intel Celeron, Pentium II and Pentium III, as well as AMD K6-2 and K6-III processors. Cyrix processors are no longer available for desktop computers during this generation, being used for laptop and notebook computers only. Discrete graphics cards became available in many models using the AGP form factor. Most models used ATI Rage graphics on board or on dedicated cards, typically the Rage LT Pro (a mobile-oriented graphics chip on an AGP card for desktop models). Optical drives supporting the then-new DVD-ROM format were also available as an option on several models. Starting with this generation, ethernet cards are available as standard equipment for several models alongside a dial-up modem card (which has been upgraded from V.32 to V.90 supporting 56k speeds), which not only provided faster connection speeds to the internet as well as the added benefit of not having to dial a specific phone number to connect to the internet in the case of broadband or an always-online connection, but also allowed users to share internet connections, files, and peripherals over the home network. The initial ethernet cards supported 10BASE-T, which offered speeds up to 10 Mbps. These models came shipped with Windows 98 (original release) preinstalled.

Laptop and notebook computers in the Presario family continues to be offered during this generation, which includes the AMD K6-2 powered 1200 and 1600 series. Laptop/notebook models used Intel, AMD, and Cyrix processors, and would also be the last generation of Presario computers to use Cyrix processors in any capacity.

Despite all desktop and most laptop/notebook computers being succeeded by the "Series 4" Presario computers in 1999, the 1200 series of laptops continued to be produced outside of the generation it was introduced, with new models being produced up until 2000.

==== "Series 4" (1999–2000) ====
In 1999, a new lineup of computers in the Presario family were introduced, marking the fourth generation of Presario computers, also known as "Series 4". Announced on June 15, 1999, this was the second in the series to be labeled as "Compaq Presario Internet PCs" since the "Series 3" generation, and consisted of the initial 5300 and 5700 series as well as the later 5800, 5900, 7300, 7400, 7500, 7800, and 7900 series. Other specialized models include the 3500 and EZ2000 series. Several of these models are also available in build-to-order configurations, which can be acquired via retail kiosks or on Compaq's website.

These models redesigned the spaceship form factor of previous generation Presarios with a more curvature design, and most of them had translucent purple plastic flip-up doors that provided access to USB and/or FireWire (IEEE 1394) ports. Processors ranged from the Intel Celeron to Pentium III, and the AMD K6-2 to Athlon. All models came with a floppy disk drive, CD-ROM drive, AGP graphics card, sound card, and a built-in modem as standard. DVD-ROM drives were also offered as standard equipment in select models. Being internet-focused models, they came with both ethernet and dial-up modem cards as standard equipment in several models, with ethernet cards now supporting both 10BASE-T and 100BASE-T (Fast Ethernet) to offer speeds at either 10 Mbps or 100 Mbps. They came shipped with Windows 98 Second Edition preinstalled.

Laptop and notebook computers within the Presario family continues to be offered during this generation, including the AMD K6-2 powered 1200 and 1600 series, as well as the 1800 and 1900 series. Laptop/notebook models exclusively used Intel and AMD processors; Cyrix processors were no longer available in any capacity within the Presario brand.

==== "Series 5" (2000–2002, 2002–2006) ====
The Presario lineup was refreshed once again in 2000 with all-new models, making it the fifth and final generation of Presario computers produced by Compaq before merging with HP in 2002, also known as "Series 5". Announced on June 21, 2000, this was the third and final series to be labeled as "Compaq Presario Internet PCs" since the "Series 3" generation, and initially featured two models, the entry-level 5000 series and the high-end 7000 series. On September 24, 2001, in time for the release of Microsoft's then-new Windows XP operating system, the lineup was changed; the 5000 series received an update while the 7000 series was replaced by the 8000 series, and the "Internet PC" label used since the "Series 3" generation was dropped. Between 2001 and 2002, the 4000 and 6000 series were added to the lineup. Japan also received the 3200 and 3500 series exclusively for that region on September 22, 2000, the latter of which was based on a similarly named model from the previous generation. Like previous generation of Presarios since the "Series 3" generation, several models listed above are also available in build-to-order configurations, which can be acquired via retail kiosks or on Compaq's website.

The new models became more design-conscious than previous generation Presarios; many of them opting for a more fresh and sophisticated design language with newly designed cases, monitors and peripherals. The cases in particular were all new, moving away from the traditional spaceship design language that was used since 1996. Processor choices were once again Intel and AMD, ranging from the Intel Celeron to the Pentium III and Pentium 4, and the AMD Duron to the Athlon and Athlon XP. A floppy disk drive, CD-ROM or CD-RW drive, AGP graphics card, sound card, an Ethernet card, and a built-in modem were standard. Modems conformed to both V.90 and V.92 specifications, the latter being introduced in November 2000. DVD-ROM drives were also offered as standard equipment in select models. All models initially came with Windows 98 Second Edition upon introduction, which was replaced with Windows Me in September 2000, and then Windows XP in September 2001, with Windows 2000 Professional being offered as an option for certain configurable AMD-powered 7000 series models in October 2000, prior to the release of Windows XP.

New laptop and notebook models were also introduced, it being the 1400, 1700, and 1800 series. The 1200 series continues to be offered, while other laptops produced during this generation include the 700, 2700, and 3000 series. All laptops/notebooks during this generation used Intel and AMD processors.

After Compaq and HP merged in 2002, several existing models from this generation such as the 6000 and 8000 series were carried over into the new company, coexisting with HP's other products of the time. These models were discontinued in favor of newer models on January 29, 2006.

Image gallery

Compaq Presario 4000 (2001)

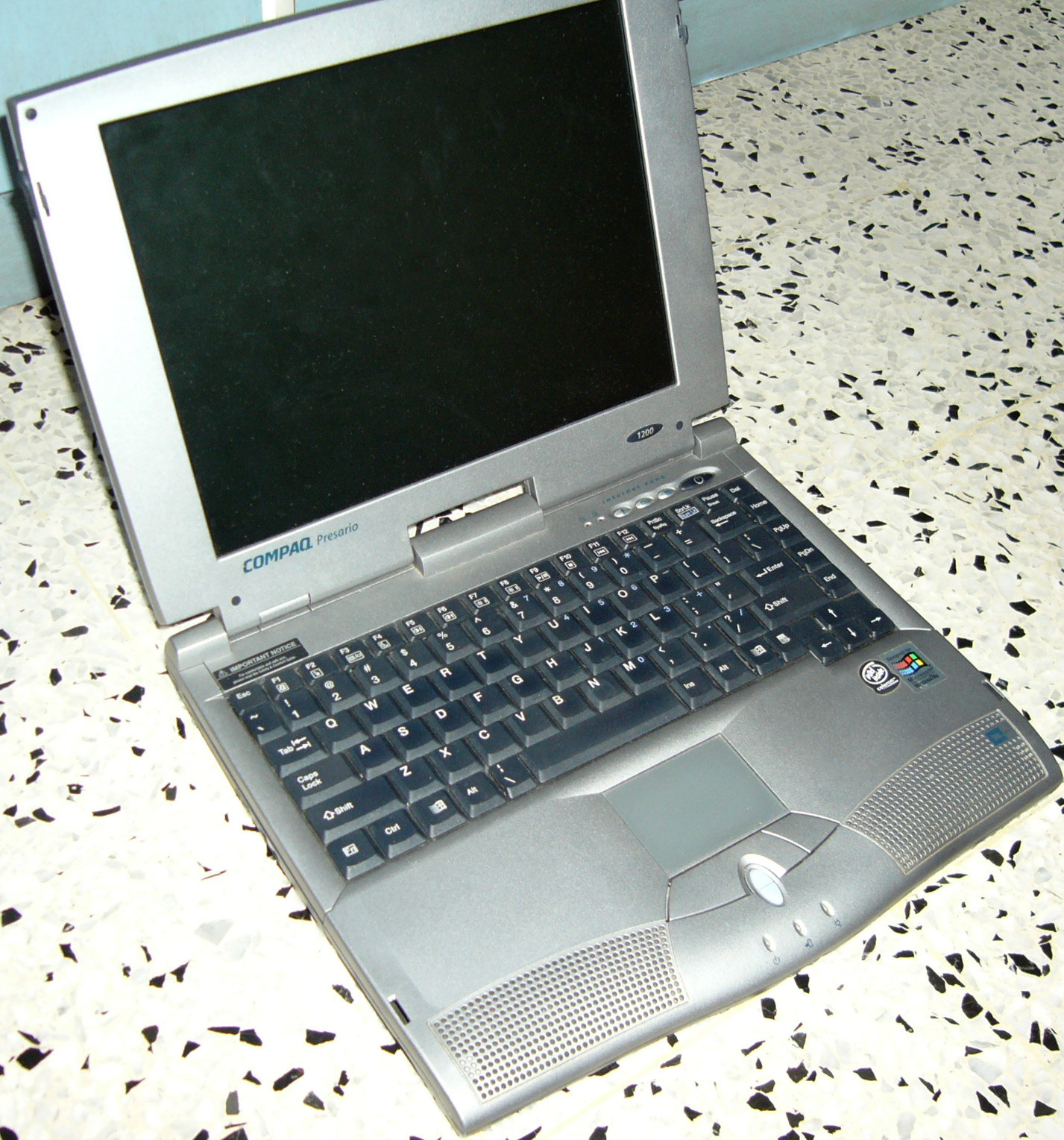
Compaq Presario 1200-XL405 (2000)

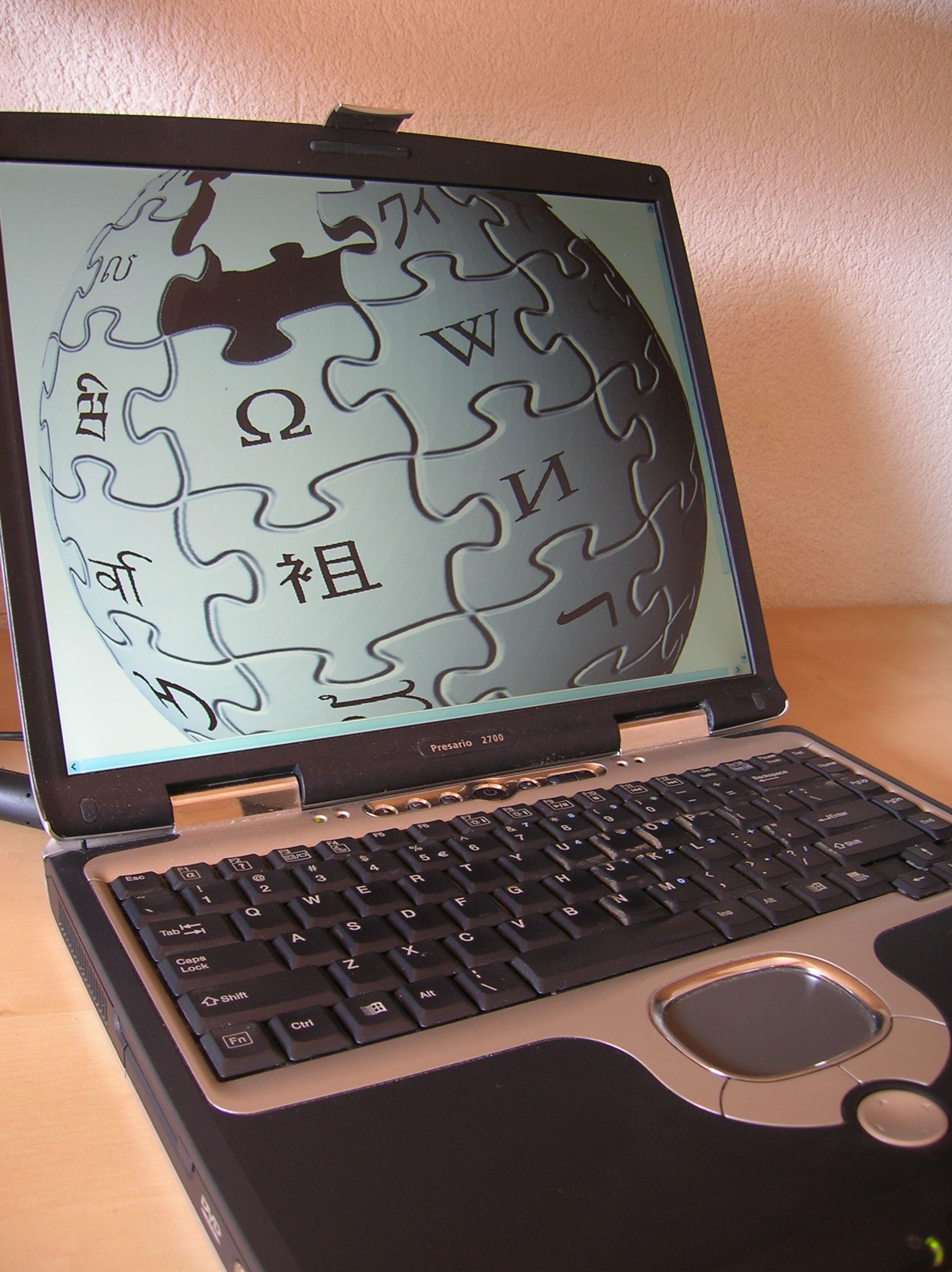
Compaq Presario 2700EA (2001)

==== Post-merger models (2002–2013) ====
Shortly after the merger with Compaq and HP closed in May 2002, all models in the Presario lineup were produced by HP, being sold alongside HP's other offerings such as the Pavilion (and later Envy). In the mid-2000s, new models in the Presario brand were introduced, replacing the ones that were carried over from Compaq into the new company in 2002 (which were discontinued on January 29, 2006). At that time, the Presario brand was repurposed as a line of entry-level computers made by HP under the Compaq brand name to distinguish it from HP's other mainstream brands. Unlike previous generation Presario computers made by Compaq prior to the 2002 merger, which were often referred to as "Series" to determine each lineup from one generation to the next, the refreshed lineup by HP does not use the aforementioned naming scheme to represent each new generation of computers.

The initial models in the Presario lineup following the 2002 merger include the 4000, 6000, and 8000 series of desktop computers from the previous "Series 5" generation, which were sold until late January 2006, while later models produced by HP under the Compaq Presario brand include the S, SA, SG, SR, SV, and CQ series of desktop computers and the 2100, 2200, 2500, A, B, C (C500, C700), F (F500, F700), M (M2000), R (R3000), V (V2000, V3000, V5000, V6000), X (X6000), XL, and CQ series of laptop computers. All-in-one models returned to the Presario brand in the late-2000s and early-2010s since it was last produced by Compaq in 1998, and were manufactured by HP.

The hardware was initially the same as the pre-merger models, including processors such as the Pentium 4 and Athlon XP, however later Presario models made by HP consisted of low-end to mid-range hardware, with the majority of Presario desktops using entry-level and mid-range processors such as the Pentium Dual-Core and Athlon II. In most cases, on board graphics and sound were standard. During the latter part of this generation, older technologies such as the floppy disk drive, AGP graphics card, and a built-in modem were phased out of the lineup. Some Presario desktops were rebrands of equivalent HP models, while Presario laptops often consisted of near-identical rebrands of HP models, such as the Presario V2000 being based on the Pavilion dv1000 series of laptops. All models initially came with Windows XP preinstalled at the start of this generation, which was later replaced with Windows Vista in November 2006, and then Windows 7 in July 2009. Compaq-provided software was also subsequently replaced with HP-provided software following the 2002 merger.

All models of the Presario brand produced by HP were produced up until 2013, the same year the Compaq brand name was quietly discontinued by HP. At the time of its discontinuation, only three desktop models and three laptop models were available as of May 2013, most of them being the same models introduced since at least 2009.

Image gallery

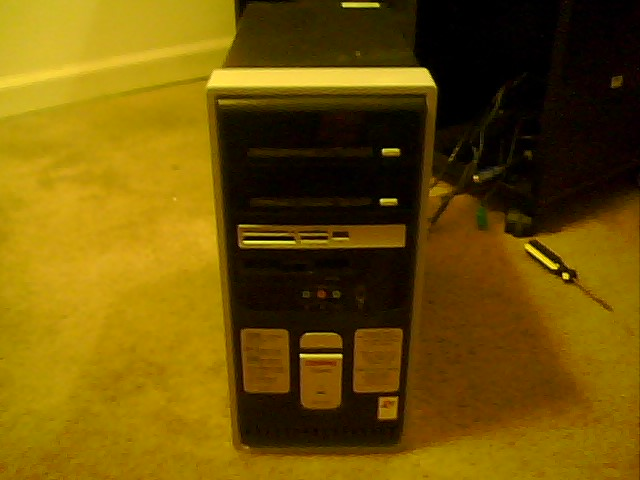
Presario SR1050NX, taken in 2009

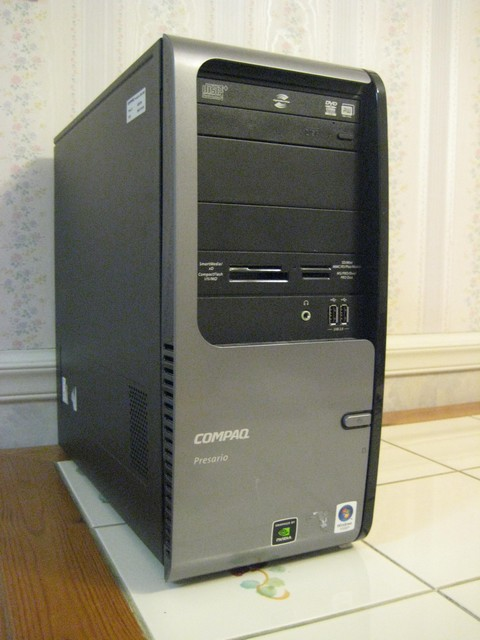
Presario SR5130NX

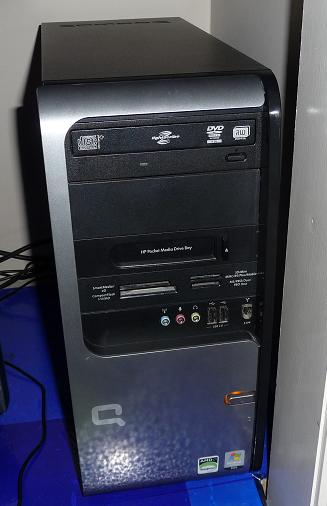
Presario SR5120AN (with HP Personal Media Drive bay) — this is the Australian version of the desktop

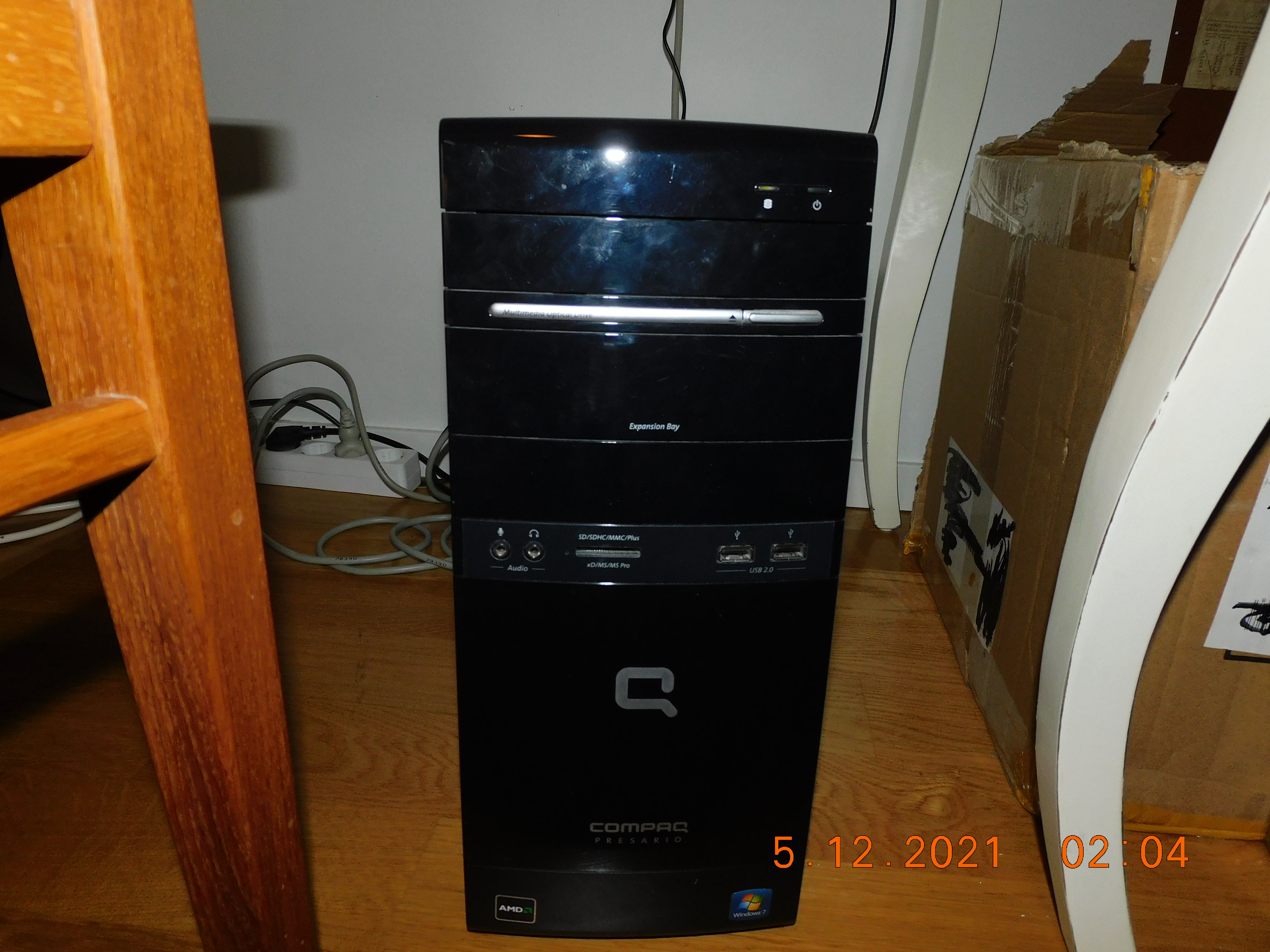
Presario CQ series desktop

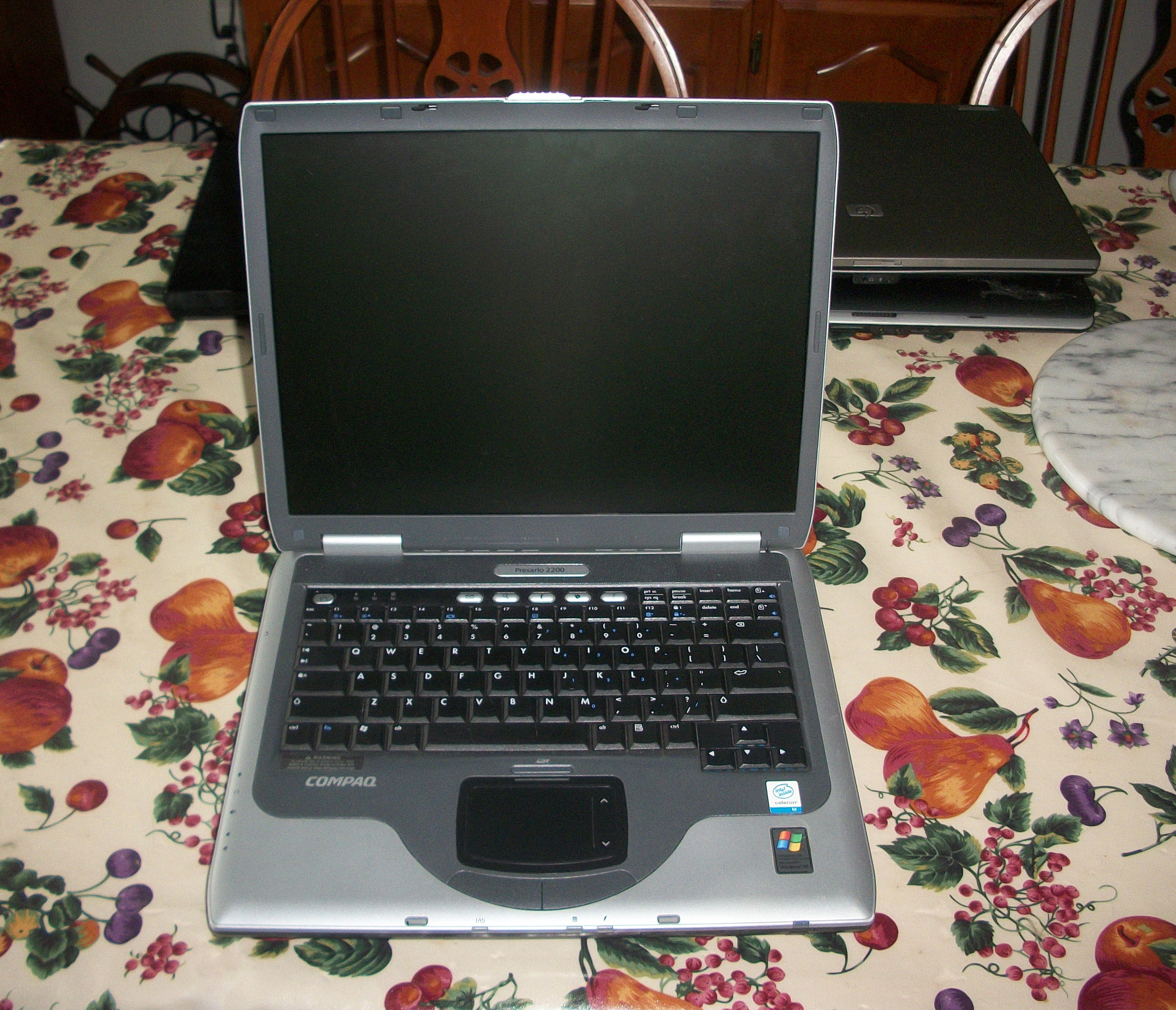
Presario 2200 notebook

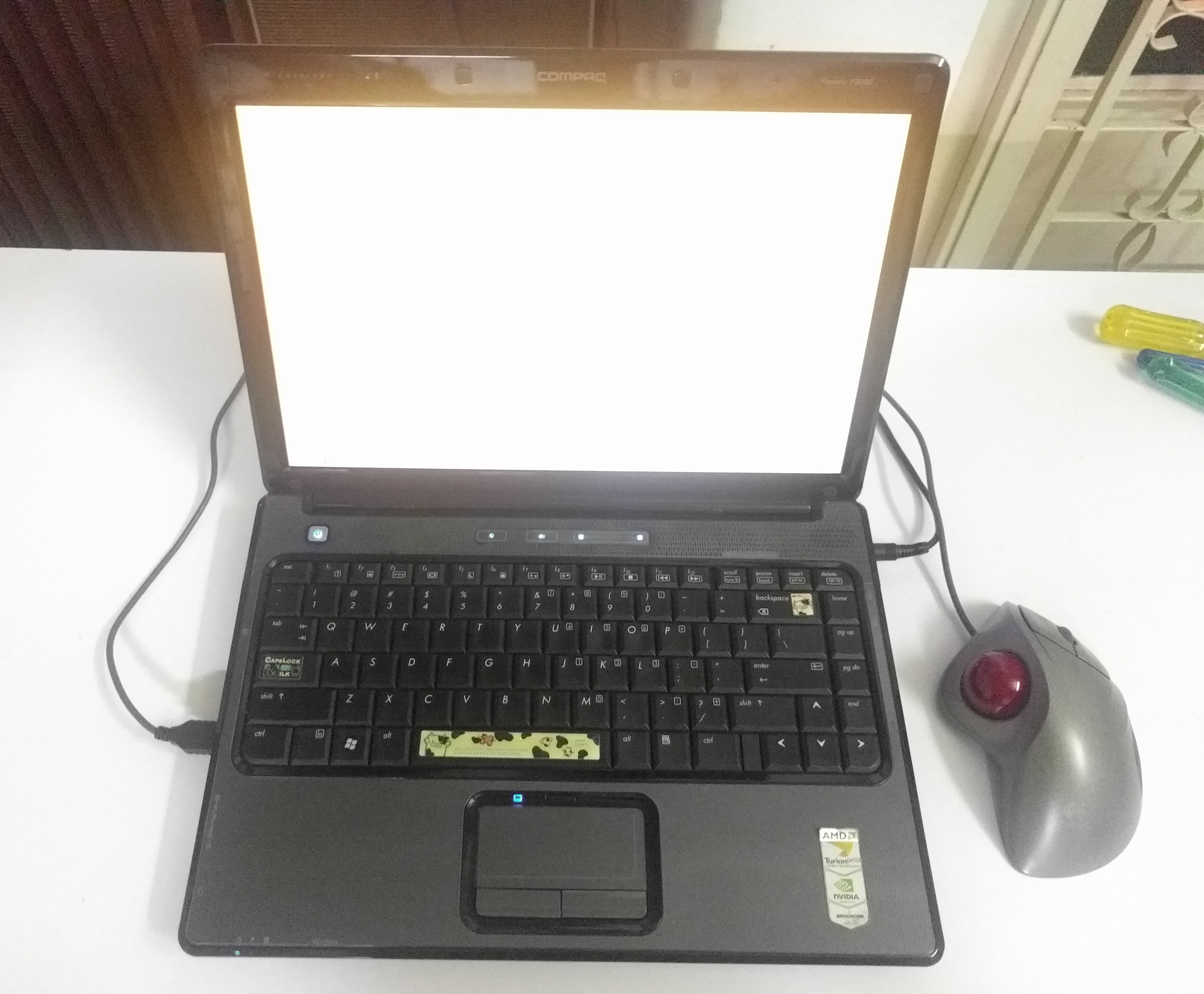
Presario V3000 (V3614AU)

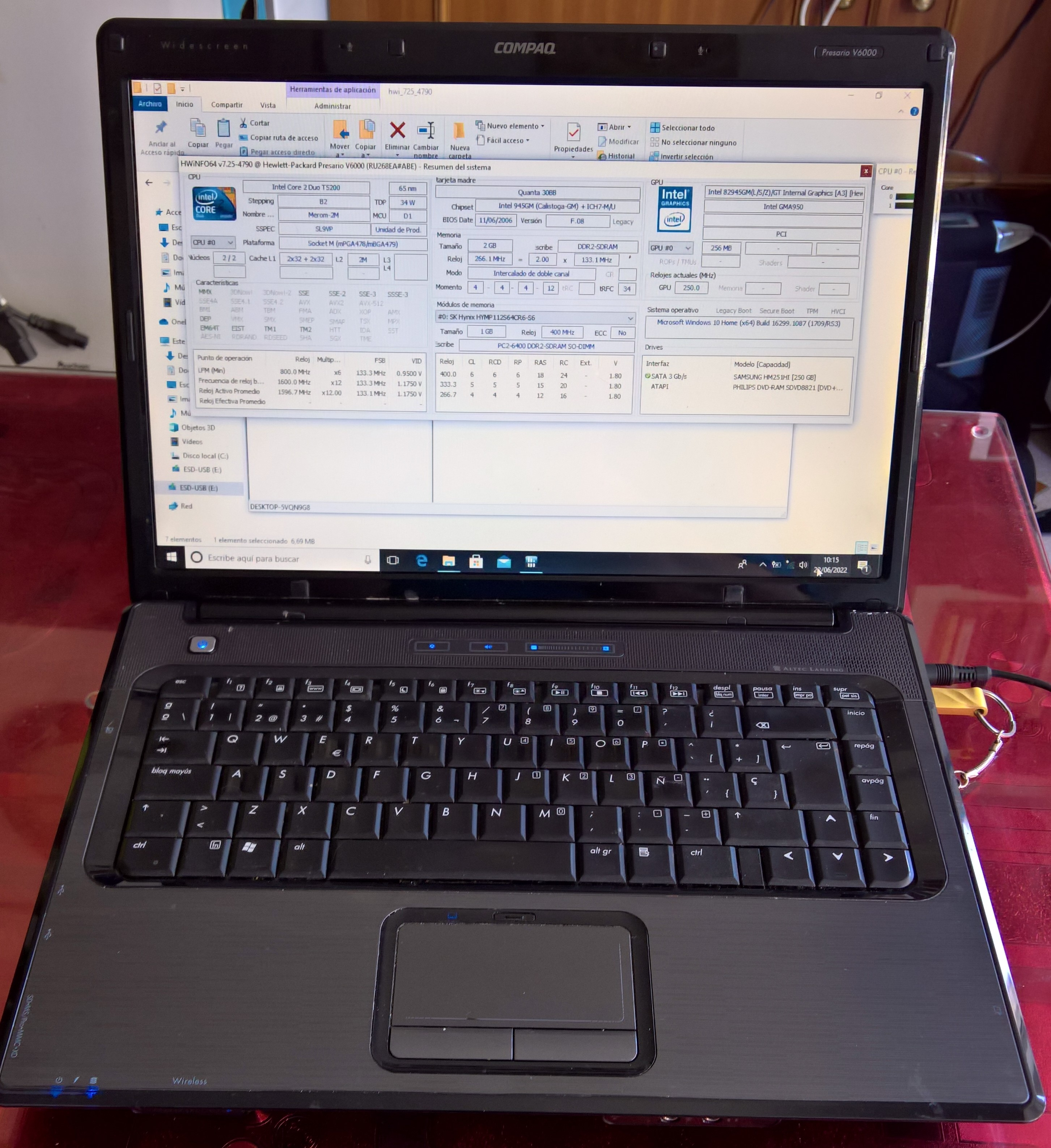
Presario V6000

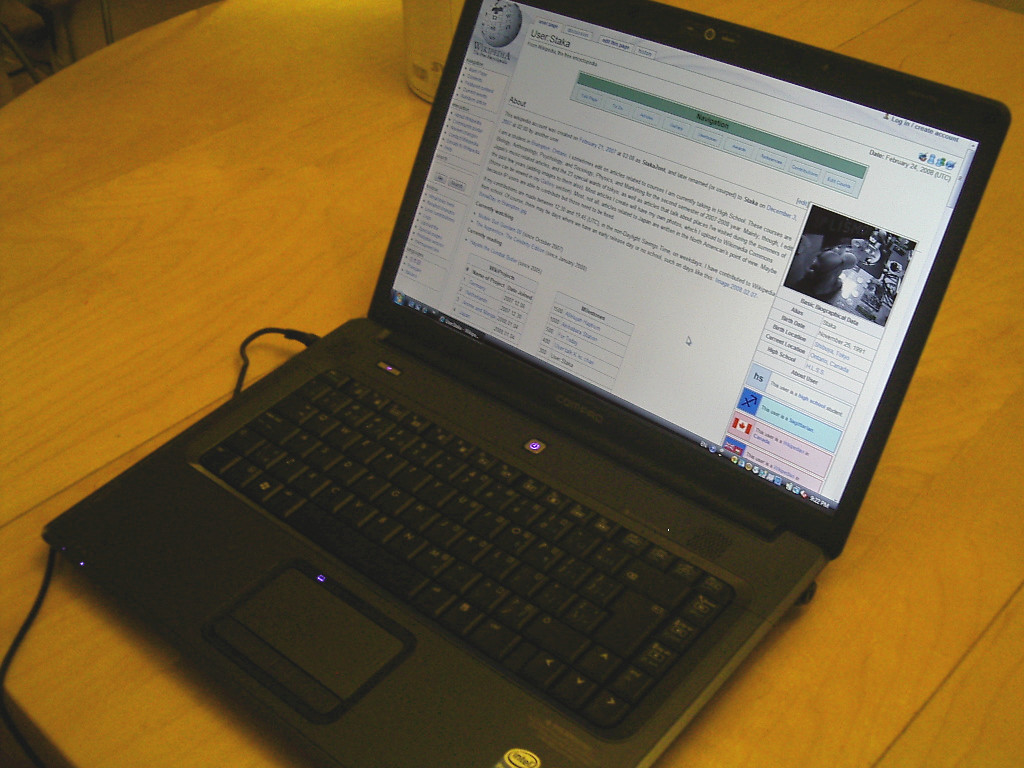
Presario C700 (C758CA)

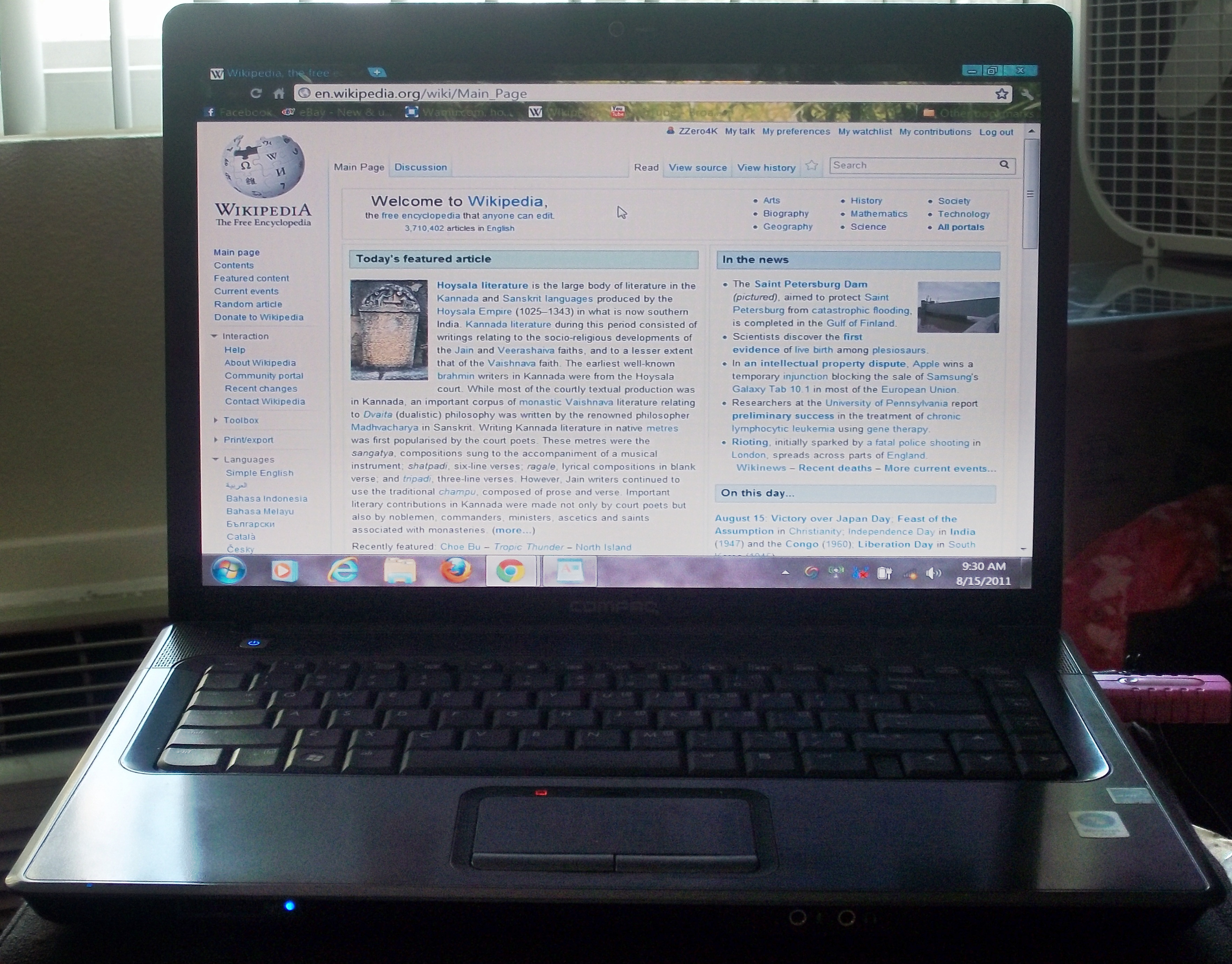
Presario F700 (F767CL)

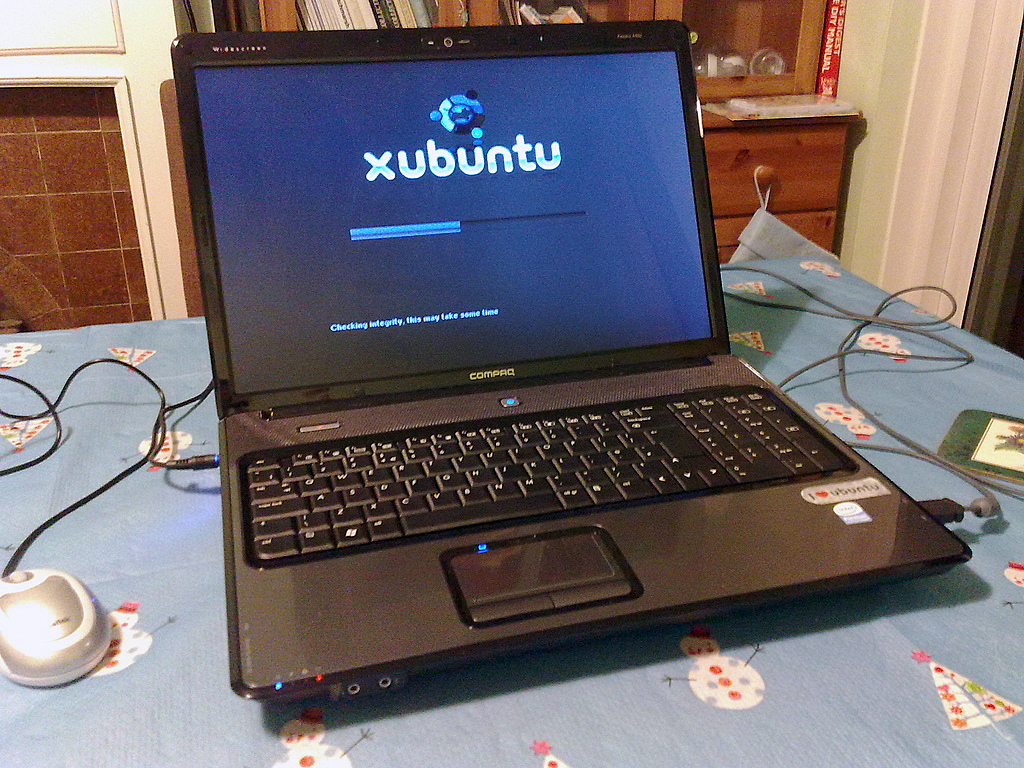
Presario A900

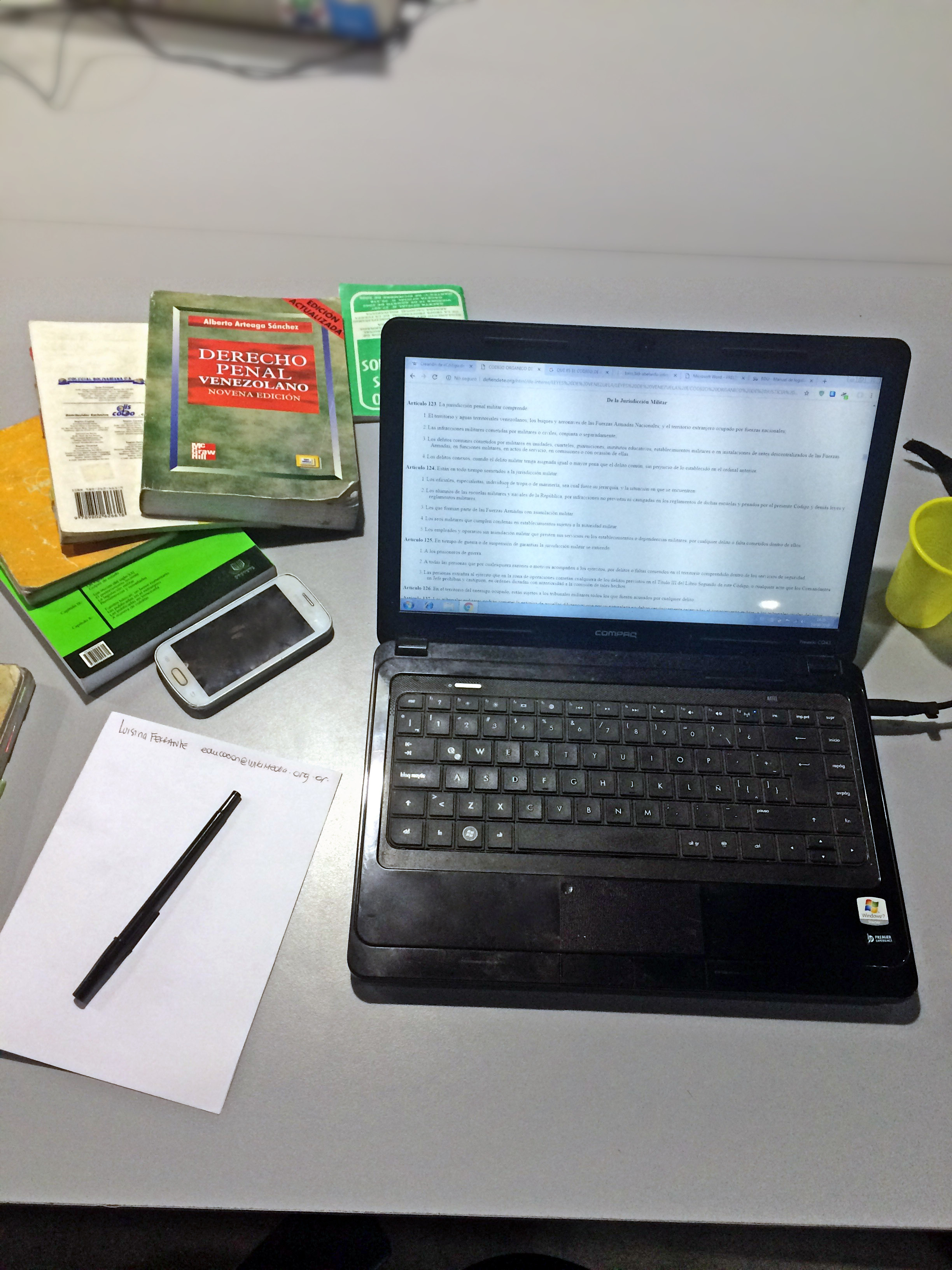
Presario CQ43

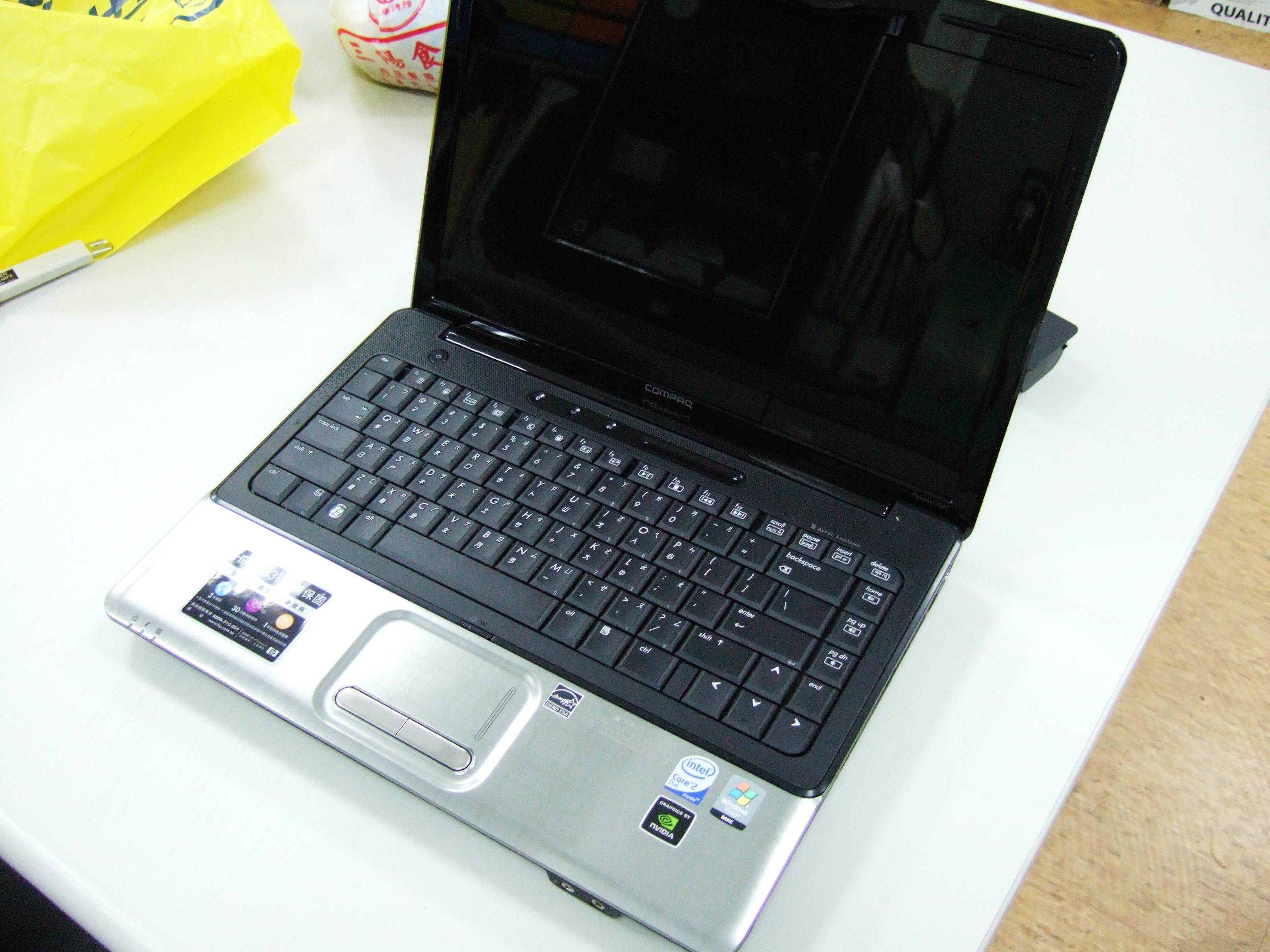
Presario CQ45

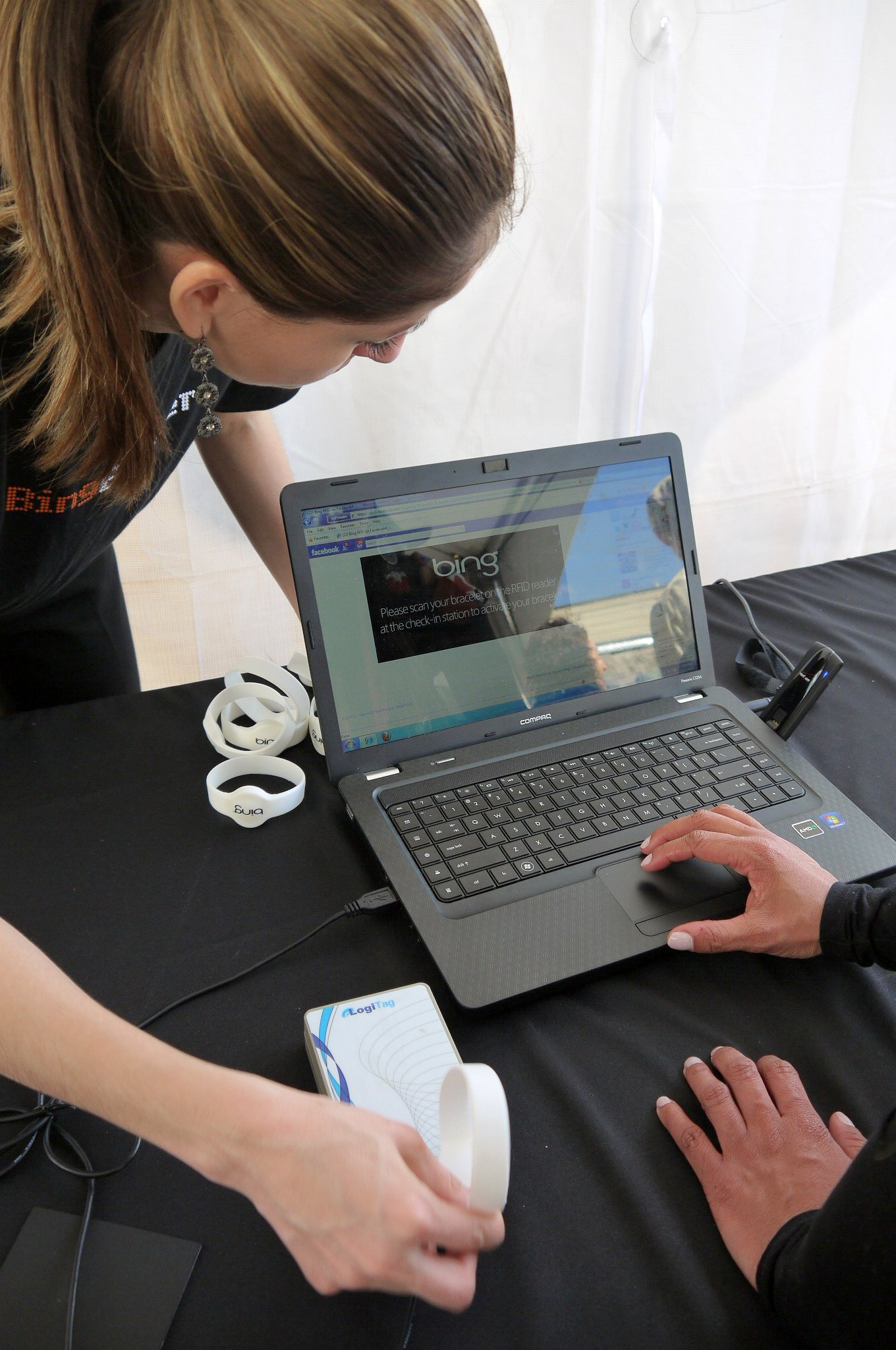
Presario CQ56

Presario CQ62

== Desktops ==
Many generations of Compaq Presario computers have been produced since 1993, with a variety of models featuring many different components and features. Each computer was manufactured in either a desktop or a tower form factor.

=== Desktop PC series ===
(Note that is a non-exhaustive list and may never satisfy completeness but shows some of the more or less common models of desktops under the Presario brand.)

- Compaq Presario 600 series
  - Compaq Presario 633
  - Compaq Presario 650
  - Compaq Presario 660
- Compaq Presario 800 series
  - Compaq Presario 850
  - Compaq Presario 866
  - Compaq Presario 833 CDS (Note: Models equipped with a CD-ROM drive and a Sound Blaster 16 sound card as standard equipment from 1993 to 1995)
  - Compaq Presario 860 CDS
- Compaq Presario 2100 series
  - Compaq Presario 2100
  - Compaq Presario 2110
  - Compaq Presario 2120
- Compaq Presario 2200 series
  - Compaq Presario 2200
  - Compaq Presario 2240
  - Compaq Presario 2254
  - Compaq Presario 2256
  - Compaq Presario 2266
  - Compaq Presario 2285V
  - Compaq Presario 2286
  - Compaq Presario 2288
- Compaq Presario 2400 series
  - Compaq Presario 2410es
  - Compaq Presario 2412es
  - Compaq Presario 2415
  - Compaq Presario 2416es
  - Compaq Presario 2417
- Compaq Presario 2510
- Compaq Presario 3000 series
  - Compaq Presario 3000EA
  - Compaq Presario 3004EA
  - Compaq Presario 3006NL
  - Compaq Presario 3008EA
  - Compaq Presario 3008NL
  - Compaq Presario 3009EA
  - Compaq Presario 3020
  - Compaq Presario 3060
- Compaq Presario 3200 series
  - Compaq Presario 3220JP
  - Compaq Presario 3221JP
- Compaq Presario 3500 series
  - Compaq Presario 3500
  - Compaq Presario 3522JP
  - Compaq Presario 3523JP
  - Compaq Presario 3524JP
  - Compaq Presario 3550
  - Compaq Presario 3566
  - Compaq Presario 3588
  - Compaq Presario 3590
- Compaq Presario 4090US
- Compaq Presario 4100 series
  - Compaq Presario 4100CA
  - Compaq Presario 4100US
  - Compaq Presario 4108
  - Compaq Presario 4110
  - Compaq Presario 4112
  - Compaq Presario 4122
  - Compaq Presario 4160
- Compaq Presario 4200 series
  - Compaq Presario 4212es
  - Compaq Presario 4220
  - Compaq Presario 4222
  - Compaq Presario 4230es
  - Compaq Presario 4240es
- Compaq Presario 4500 series
  - Compaq Presario 4504
  - Compaq Presario 4505
  - Compaq Presario 4508
  - Compaq Presario 4528
  - Compaq Presario 4532
  - Compaq Presario 4540
- Compaq Presario 4600 series
  - Compaq Presario 4600
  - Compaq Presario 4620
  - Compaq Presario 4626
  - Compaq Presario 4640
  - Compaq Presario 4660
  - Compaq Presario 4665
- Compaq Presario 4700 series
  - Compaq Presario 4700LA
  - Compaq Presario 4704
  - Compaq Presario 4705LA
  - Compaq Presario 4706
  - Compaq Presario 4710
  - Compaq Presario 4710LA
  - Compaq Presario 4712
  - Compaq Presario 4714
  - Compaq Presario 4716
  - Compaq Presario 4720LA
  - Compaq Presario 4760
  - Compaq Presario 4764
  - Compaq Presario 4770
- Compaq Presario 4800 series
  - Compaq Presario 4800
  - Compaq Presario 4808
  - Compaq Presario 4810
  - Compaq Presario 4812
  - Compaq Presario 4814
  - Compaq Presario 4824
  - Compaq Presario 4830
  - Compaq Presario 4860
  - Compaq Presario 4880
  - Compaq Presario 4882
- Compaq Presario 4910
- Compaq Presario 5000 series
  - Compaq Presario 5000
  - Compaq Presario 5003R
  - Compaq Presario 5003US
  - Compaq Presario 5004EA
  - Compaq Presario 5006US
  - Compaq Presario 5008US
  - Compaq Presario 5000A
  - Compaq Presario 5000T (Note: Offered via Compaq's "Built For You" program (configurable models offered via kiosks in retail locations and on Compaq's online store))
  - Compaq Presario 5000Z
  - Compaq Presario 5010
  - Compaq Presario 5020
  - Compaq Presario 5030
  - Compaq Presario 5050
  - Compaq Presario 5070
  - Compaq Presario 5080
- Compaq Presario 5100 series
  - Compaq Presario 5100AN
  - Compaq Presario 5100CA
  - Compaq Presario 5100JP
  - Compaq Presario 5100US
  - Compaq Presario 5101RSH
  - Compaq Presario 5102CA
  - Compaq Presario 5102US
  - Compaq Presario 5104US
  - Compaq Presario 5105RSH
  - Compaq Presario 5106CA
  - Compaq Presario 5106CL
  - Compaq Presario 5108US
  - Compaq Presario 5109RSH
  - Compaq Presario 5110
  - Compaq Presario 5112EA
  - Compaq Presario 5112JP
  - Compaq Presario 5123SR
  - Compaq Presario 5127SR
  - Compaq Presario 5150
  - Compaq Presario 5170
  - Compaq Presario 5184
  - Compaq Presario 5185
  - Compaq Presario 5190
- Compaq Presario 5200 series
  - Compaq Presario 5202
  - Compaq Presario 5222
  - Compaq Presario 5240
  - Compaq Presario 5280
  - Compaq Presario 5285
- Compaq Presario 5300 series
  - Compaq Presario 5300
  - Compaq Presario 5300EA
  - Compaq Presario 5300LA
  - Compaq Presario 5300US
  - Compaq Presario 5315KS
  - Compaq Presario 5360
- Compaq Presario 5400 series
  - Compaq Presario 5400
  - Compaq Presario 5400EA
  - Compaq Presario 5400US
  - Compaq Presario 5410
  - Compaq Presario 5410US
  - Compaq Presario 5423US
  - Compaq Presario 5441
  - Compaq Presario 5460
  - Compaq Presario 5475
  - Compaq Presario 5477
- Compaq Presario 5500 series
  - Compaq Presario 5500
  - Compaq Presario 5520
  - Compaq Presario 5526
  - Compaq Presario 5528
  - Compaq Presario 5536
  - Compaq Presario 5553
  - Compaq Presario 5599
- Compaq Presario 5600 series
  - Compaq Presario 5600i
  - Compaq Presario 5660
  - Compaq Presario 5670
  - Compaq Presario 5686
  - Compaq Presario 5690
  - Compaq Presario 5695
- Compaq Presario 5700 series
  - Compaq Presario 5700
  - Compaq Presario 5700N
  - Compaq Presario 5700T
  - Compaq Presario 5710
  - Compaq Presario 5726
- Compaq Presario 5800 series
  - Compaq Presario 5826
  - Compaq Presario 5853
  - Compaq Presario 5868
  - Compaq Presario 5888
  - Compaq Presario 5890
- Compaq Presario 5900 series
  - Compaq Presario 5900R
  - Compaq Presario 5900T
  - Compaq Presario 5900Z
- Compaq Presario 5BW/5UV/5UW/5WV series (Note: Build-to-order models of the Compaq Presario 5000 series offered via Compaq's "Built For You" program (sold via kiosks in retail outlets and on Compaq's online store))
  - Compaq Presario 5BW284
  - Compaq Presario 5BWME2
  - Compaq Presario 5BWMC2
  - Compaq Presario 5UVME2
  - Compaq Presario 5UW5300JP
  - Compaq Presario 5WV260
- Compaq Presario 6000 series
  - Compaq Presario 6000KS
  - Compaq Presario 6000EA
  - Compaq Presario 6000T
  - Compaq Presario 6000Z
  - Compaq Presario 6300US
  - Compaq Presario 6310US
  - Compaq Presario 6320US
- Compaq Presario 6400 series
  - Compaq Presario 6410
  - Compaq Presario 6410NX
  - Compaq Presario 6410LA
  - Compaq Presario 6410LS
- Compaq Presario 6500 series
  - Compaq Presario 6510SE
  - Compaq Presario 6520SE
  - Compaq Presario 6525SE
  - Compaq Presario 6530SE
  - Compaq Presario 6531SE
  - Compaq Presario 6550SE
  - Compaq Presario 6560SE
- Compaq Presario 6600 series
  - Compaq Presario 6620SE
  - Compaq Presario 6640SE
- Compaq Presario 6700 series
  - Compaq Presario 6704
  - Compaq Presario 6708
- Compaq Presario 7000 series
  - Compaq Presario 7000
  - Compaq Presario 7000A
  - Compaq Presario 7000CA
  - Compaq Presario 7000EA
  - Compaq Presario 7000US
  - Compaq Presario 7001CL
  - Compaq Presario 7002EA
  - Compaq Presario 7002US
  - Compaq Presario 7003EA
  - Compaq Presario 7003US
  - Compaq Presario 7004EA
  - Compaq Presario 7004LA
  - Compaq Presario 7005EA
  - Compaq Presario 7006US
  - Compaq Presario 7000T
  - Compaq Presario 7000Z
- Compaq Presario 7100 series
  - Compaq Presario 7102CA
  - Compaq Presario 7104CA
  - Compaq Presario 7110
  - Compaq Presario 7110EA
  - Compaq Presario 7110US
  - Compaq Presario 7111LA
  - Compaq Presario 7112EA
  - Compaq Presario 7112LA
  - Compaq Presario 7113EA
  - Compaq Presario 7118US
  - Compaq Presario 7120EA
  - Compaq Presario 7120US
  - Compaq Presario 7126CL
  - Compaq Presario 7126EA
  - Compaq Presario 7130US
  - Compaq Presario 7140US
  - Compaq Presario 7150
  - Compaq Presario 7151WM
  - Compaq Presario 7152
  - Compaq Presario 7170
  - Compaq Presario 7180
- Compaq Presario 7200 series
  - Compaq Presario 7212
  - Compaq Presario 7222
  - Compaq Presario 7232
  - Compaq Presario 7234
  - Compaq Presario 7240
  - Compaq Presario 7222es
  - Compaq Presario 7234es
- Compaq Presario 7300 series
  - Compaq Presario 7350
  - Compaq Presario 7360
- Compaq Presario 7400 series
  - Compaq Presario 7400
  - Compaq Presario 7430
  - Compaq Presario 7450
  - Compaq Presario 7460
  - Compaq Presario 7470
  - Compaq Presario 7478
  - Compaq Presario 7480
  - Compaq Presario 7488
- Compaq Presario 7500 series
  - Compaq Presario 7500
  - Compaq Presario 7543
  - Compaq Presario 7568
  - Compaq Presario 7573
  - Compaq Presario 7588
  - Compaq Presario 7594
  - Compaq Presario 7596
  - Compaq Presario 7598
  - Compaq Presario 7599
- Compaq Presario 7800 series
  - Compaq Presario 7800
  - Compaq Presario 7885
  - Compaq Presario 7895
- Compaq Presario 7900 series
  - Compaq Presario 7922
  - Compaq Presario 7930
  - Compaq Presario 7940
  - Compaq Presario 7947
  - Compaq Presario 7950
  - Compaq Presario 7970
  - Compaq Presario 7980
  - Compaq Presario 7990
  - Compaq Presario 7998
- Compaq Presario 7AP/7EL/7PL/7QS/7RP series (Note: Build-to-order models of the Compaq Presario 7000 series offered via Compaq's "Built For You" program (sold via kiosks in retail outlets and on Compaq's online store))
  - Compaq Presario 7AP134
  - Compaq Presario 7AP135
  - Compaq Presario 7AP140
  - Compaq Presario 7AP170
  - Compaq Presario 7AP190
  - Compaq Presario 7EL140
  - Compaq Presario 7EL160
  - Compaq Presario 7EL180
  - Compaq Presario 7EL193
  - Compaq Presario 7ELM21
  - Compaq Presario 7ELN21
  - Compaq Presario 7PL270
  - Compaq Presario 7PL273
  - Compaq Presario 7PL287
  - Compaq Presario 7PL290
  - Compaq Presario 7PL295
  - Compaq Presario 7PL313
  - Compaq Presario 7PLK11
  - Compaq Presario 7PLK12
  - Compaq Presario 7PLM11
  - Compaq Presario 7QSM11
  - Compaq Presario 7QSM1A
  - Compaq Presario 7QSM1C
  - Compaq Presario 7QSM1R
  - Compaq Presario 7QSME2
  - Compaq Presario 7QSMEC
  - Compaq Presario 7QSMEE
  - Compaq Presario 7QSMEZ
  - Compaq Presario 7RPM11
  - Compaq Presario 7RPME2
  - Compaq Presario 7RPMEC
  - Compaq Presario 7RPMEZ
- Compaq Presario 8000 series
  - Compaq Presario 8017US
  - Compaq Presario 8022US
  - Compaq Presario 8050EA
  - Compaq Presario 8060EA
  - Compaq Presario 8070EA
  - Compaq Presario 8075EA
  - Compaq Presario 8080EA
  - Compaq Presario 8090EA
  - Compaq Presario 8095EA
  - Compaq Presario 8000T
  - Compaq Presario 8000Z
- Compaq Presario 8100 series
  - Compaq Presario 8105EA
  - Compaq Presario 8121EA
  - Compaq Presario 8125EA
  - Compaq Presario 8130EA
  - Compaq Presario 8140EA
  - Compaq Presario 8141EA
  - Compaq Presario 8142EA
  - Compaq Presario 8143EA
  - Compaq Presario 8144EA
  - Compaq Presario 8145EA
  - Compaq Presario 8153EA
  - Compaq Presario 8154EA
- Compaq Presario 8200 series
  - Compaq Presario 8200EA
  - Compaq Presario 8210EA
- Compaq Presario 8400 series
  - Compaq Presario 8405SE
  - Compaq Presario 8406SE
  - Compaq Presario 8410SE
  - Compaq Presario 8415SE
  - Compaq Presario 8420SE
  - Compaq Presario 8425SE
  - Compaq Presario 8430SE
- Compaq Presario 8500 series
  - Compaq Presario 8540SE1
  - Compaq Presario 8541SE
  - Compaq Presario 8541SE1
  - Compaq Presario 8550SE
  - Compaq Presario 8560SE
  - Compaq Presario 8570SE
  - Compaq Presario 8570SE1
  - Compaq Presario 8571SE
  - Compaq Presario 8571SE1
  - Compaq Presario 8580SE
- Compaq Presario 8600 series
  - Compaq Presario 8615SE
  - Compaq Presario 8620SE
  - Compaq Presario 8630SE
  - Compaq Presario 8640SE
  - Compaq Presario 8650SE
  - Compaq Presario 8680SE
  - Compaq Presario 8681SE
  - Compaq Presario 8682SE
  - Compaq Presario 8683SE
  - Compaq Presario 8692SE
  - Compaq Presario 8693SE
- Compaq Presario 8700 series
  - Compaq Presario 8702
  - Compaq Presario 8712
  - Compaq Presario 8720SE
  - Compaq Presario 8740SE
  - Compaq Presario 8760SE
  - Compaq Presario 8770SE
  - Compaq Presario 8780SE
- Compaq Presario 8800 series
  - Compaq Presario 8800SE
  - Compaq Presario 8810SE
  - Compaq Presario 8820SE
  - Compaq Presario 8840SE
  - Compaq Presario 8860SE
  - Compaq Presario 8880SE
  - Compaq Presario 8885SE
- Compaq Presario 8900 series
  - Compaq Presario 8900SE
  - Compaq Presario 8901SE
  - Compaq Presario 8920SE
  - Compaq Presario 8940SE
  - Compaq Presario 8960SE
  - Compaq Presario 8970SE
  - Compaq Presario 8980SE
- Compaq Presario 9000 series
  - Compaq Presario 9000SE
  - Compaq Presario 9020SE
  - Compaq Presario 9040SE
  - Compaq Presario 9050SE
  - Compaq Presario 9060SE
  - Compaq Presario 9070SE
  - Compaq Presario 9080SE
  - Compaq Presario 9085SE
- Compaq Presario 9200 series
  - Compaq Presario 9232
  - Compaq Presario 9234
  - Compaq Presario 9240
  - Compaq Presario 9250
- Compaq Presario 9500 series
  - Compaq Presario 9536
  - Compaq Presario 9546
  - Compaq Presario 9548
  - Compaq Presario 9564
- Compaq Presario 9600 series
  - Compaq Presario 9642
  - Compaq Presario 9660
- Compaq Presario CQ1000 series
- Compaq Presario CQ1100 series
- Compaq Presario CQ1200 series
- Compaq Presario CQ1500 series
- Compaq Presario CQ2000 series
- Compaq Presario CQ3000 series
- Compaq Presario CQ3100 series
  - Compaq Presario CQ3180AN
- Compaq Presario CQ5000 series
- Compaq Presario CQ5100 series
  - Compaq Presario CQ5112F
- Compaq Presario CQ5200 series
- Compaq Presario CQ5300 series
  - Compaq Presario CQ5320Y
- Compaq Presario CQ5500 series
  - Compaq Presario CQ5500F
  - Compaq Presario CQ5504F
- Compaq Presario CQ5600 series
- Compaq Presario CQ5700 series
- Compaq Presario CQ5800 series
  - Compaq Presario CQ5814
- Compaq Presario EZ2000 series
  - Compaq Presario EZ2000
  - Compaq Presario EZ2200
  - Compaq Presario EZ2207
  - Compaq Presario EZ2300
  - Compaq Presario EZ2600
  - Compaq Presario EZ2605 (Note: Club model offered exclusively for discount shopping stores)
  - Compaq Presario EZ2700
- Compaq Presario S6000 series
  - Compaq Presario S6500NX
  - Compaq Presario S6700NX
- Compaq Presario SA4000 series
  - Compaq Presario SA4000T
  - Compaq Presario SA4000Z
- Compaq Presario SG1000 series
  - Compaq Presario SG1008IL
- Compaq Presario SG3700 series
  - Compaq Presario SG3730IL
- Compaq Presario SR1000 series
  - SR1000 Series
  - SR1100 Series
  - SR1200 Series
  - SR1300 Series
  - SR1400 Series
  - SR1500 Series
  - SR1600 Series
  - SR1700 Series
  - SR1800 Series
  - SR1900 Series
- Compaq Presario SR2000 series
  - Presario SR2010NX
  - Presario SR2013WM
  - Presario SR2017CL
  - Presario SR2027X
- Compaq Presario SR5000 series
  - Presario SR5013WM
  - Presario SR5030AX
  - Presario SR5125CL
  - Presario SR5210NX
  - Presario SR5250NX
  - Presario SR5350F
  - Presario SR5410F
  - Presario SR5550F
  - Presario SR5605F
  - Presario SR5707C
  - Presario SR5710Y (Note: Build-to-order "Configure To Order" model offered on the Compaq/HP online store)
  - Presario SR5520AN
- Compaq Presario SV2000 series
- Compaq Presario SV7000 series
- Compaq Presario SV7100 series
- Compaq Presario SV7200 series
- Compaq Presario SV7300 series
- Compaq Presario SV7500 series
- Compaq Presario CDS series
  - Compaq Presario CDS 724
  - Compaq Presario CDS 920
  - Compaq Presario CDS 924
  - Compaq Presario CDS 942
  - Compaq Presario CDS 972
  - Compaq Presario CDS 982

==== Compaq Presario EZ2000 ====
The Compaq Presario EZ2000 was a series of desktop computers manufactured by Compaq. Introduced in January 2000, it was a specialized model designed for ease-of-use, with easier access to the internet. It was offered in two models, the EZ2200 and EZ2700 (the latter being exclusively offered via Compaq's build-to-order program known as "Built For You", found via kiosks in retail stores or on Compaq's website). It features a unique case design with a blue exterior and translucent plastic feet along with a built-in on-screen display with controls known as the Digital Dashboard, which can assist the user with setup instructions as well as providing feedback and interaction with the user. A door on the front of the case provides access to the computer's optical drive, floppy drive, USB and IEEE 1394 (FireWire) ports. The case also has easy-open side panels to facilitate easier access to the hardware, such as memory and PCI cards. Processors ranged from the Intel Celeron to Pentium III. A redesigned monitor known as the MV730i was also made to go alongside it, as well as including JBL Pro speakers that featured blue speaker grilles, and came bundled with EZ2700 models.

All models of the EZ2000 series came with 64 MB of RAM, integrated AGP graphics, an integrated SoundMax sound chip, 17–20 GB hard disk drives, a floppy disk drive, a 56k modem on a PCI card, and a CD-RW drive. An additional CD-ROM or DVD-ROM drive is also available as an option, as well as the option for Ethernet connectivity.

==== Compaq Presario 5000 ====
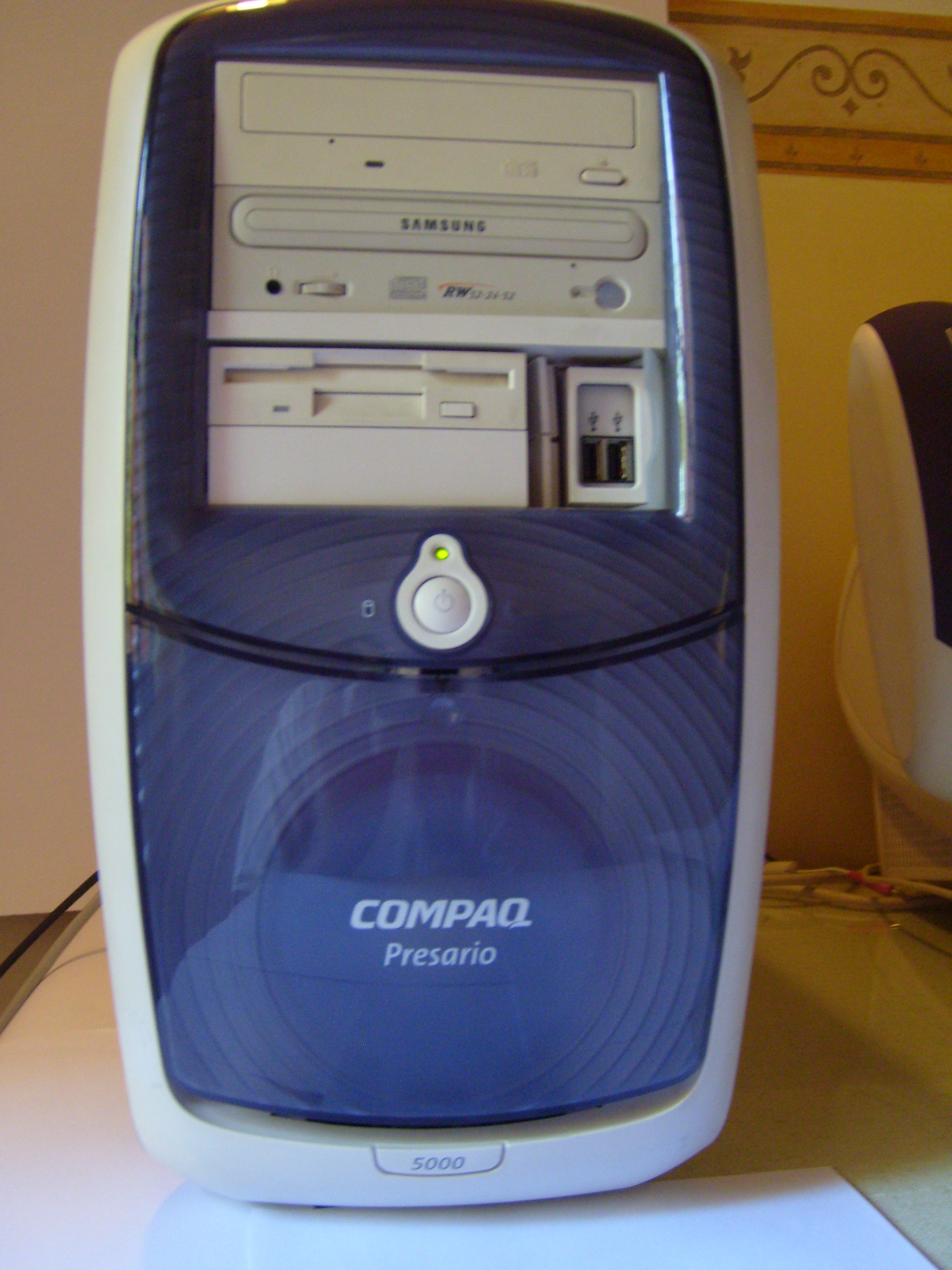
Compaq Presario 5000 (2000)

The Compaq Presario 5000 was a series of desktop computers produced between 2000 and 2002 by Compaq. First introduced alongside the 7000 series in North America on June 21, 2000, it arrived in India on August 9, 2000, and then in Japan on September 22, 2000. The 5000 series targeted the value market, serving as the entry-level computer for budget-minded customers, featuring hardware at an affordable price.

Though the 5000 series was produced as far back as 1998 during the "Series 3" generation, the 5000 series of the "Series 5" generation produced from 2000 to 2002, while sharing the same model number as the models produced between 1998 and 1999, is not to be confused with the former, and therefore are unrelated to each other due to their differences in hardware and target markets.

The 5000 series features a brand-new case design with removable translucent plastic faceplates that are offered in six colors. It also featured an optional disc holder on the bottom of the case, which can store up to five discs. The 5000 series was housed in a mini-tower case, featuring two 5.25-inch and 3.5-inch drive bays.

Hardware-wise, processor options ranged from the Celeron to the Pentium III and Pentium 4 for Intel-powered models, and the Duron to the Athlon for AMD-powered models. Most models of the 5000 series (especially Intel-powered models) came with integrated graphics, which were limited in graphical power compared to discrete graphics cards. Intel-powered models featured an Intel i742 on board with no AGP slot, while AMD-powered models have an AGP slot and came with an integrated S3 ProSavage on some models. Discrete graphics card options include the RIVA TNT2 M64 and GeForce 2 MX. It also featured integrated sound, using an ESS Allegro ES1989 for Intel-powered models and an Analog Devices AD1881 with SoundMAX AC'97 sound drivers for AMD-powered models. The specs and features of the 5000 series can also be configured by the user via Compaq's build-to-order program known as "Built For You", which can be found via kiosks in retail stores or on Compaq's website.

The 5000 series was initially shipped with Windows 98 Second Edition preinstalled upon its introduction in June 2000, and later came with Windows Me preinstalled between August and September 2000. Windows XP came preinstalled on the 5000 series starting in September 2001; an upgrade offer for Windows XP Home Edition was provided for select models of the 5000 series made between June 2001 and January 2002.

Due to popular demand, the 5000 series was updated on September 24, 2001, and continued to be produced until January 14, 2002 for the majority of the retails models, coexisting with the 4000 and 8000 series of Presario computers. A small number of limited release models of the 5000 series were sold until May 6, 2002, a few days after HP closed its acquisition of Compaq on May 3, 2002.

==== Compaq Presario 7000 ====
The Compaq Presario 7000 was a series of desktop computers produced between 2000 and 2001 by Compaq. Introduced alongside the 5000 series in North America on June 21, 2000, it arrived in India on August 9, 2000, but not in Japan, however, as only the 5000 series among other models exclusive to that region were sold there. The 7000 series was the high-end computer in Compaq's lineup at the time, serving as a niche product for the high-end performance market. Compared to the 5000 series, the 7000 series featured discrete graphics card options and powerful processors.

The 7000 series uses the same case design inherited from the 5000 series, complete with the removable translucent faceplates offered in six colors as well as an optical disc holder at the bottom, but with a more taller case. The 7000 series was housed in a mid-tower case, with three 5.25-inch drive bays and two 3.5-inch drive bays. The 7000 series also included IEEE 1394 (FireWire) ports, with one located at the front of the case alongside the two USB ports and another one on the back of the case, with expansion cards adding additional ports.

Hardware-wise, processor options ranged from the Pentium III and Pentium 4 for Intel-powered models, and the Athlon for AMD-powered models. The 7000 series had no options for integrated graphics and audio, instead featuring discrete graphics cards and sound cards. Discrete graphics card options ranged from the low-end RIVA TNT2 M64 and GeForce 2 MX to the high-end GeForce 2 GTS and GeForce 3, while sound cards ranged from the Creative Sound Blaster 128 PCI (based on the Ensoniq AudioPCI ES1373 chip) to the Creative Sound Blaster Live! Value. Like the 5000 series, the specs and features of the 7000 series can also be configured by the user via Compaq's build-to-order program known as "Built For You", which can be found via kiosks in retail stores or on Compaq's website.

The 7000 series was initially shipped with Windows 98 Second Edition preinstalled upon its introduction in June 2000, and later came with Windows Me preinstalled between August and September 2000. Windows 2000 Professional was also offered as an option for select 7000 series models beginning in October 2000, specifically the configurable AMD-powered models under Compaq's "Built For You" program. Windows XP was never officially preinstalled on the 7000 series near the latter part of its run, however an upgrade offer for Windows XP Home Edition was provided for select models of the 7000 series made between June and September 2001 from that point onwards.

Compared to the 5000 series, the 7000 series had a lifespan of only one year. Consequently, it never received an official update, since it was replaced by the 8000 series on September 24, 2001, following the latter's introduction that month.

===== Features and design of the 5000 and 7000 series =====
Upon its introduction in 2000, the Compaq Presario 5000 and 7000 series was a major departure from previous generation Presario computers of the time. They moved away from the spaceship-derived design language used since the "Series 2" generation in 1996 in favor of a brand-new design that was more sleek and stylish with curves throughout the front case, distinguishing them from previous Presario towers. Its accompanying monitors and peripherals were also redesigned in conjunction with the new models, being made in the same design language as the tower cases themselves.

Unique to the 5000 and 7000 series were the removable translucent colored plastic faceplates that became an integral part of the new design of the towers. A set of removable speaker grills and keyboard panels offered in a similar fashion were also produced alongside the faceplates themselves; these were made as part of a set of customizable accessories officially known as the MyStyle Accent Color Kits. Six colors were offered, one of them being used as the default color for all 5000 and 7000 series towers and peripherals produced for retail while the other five were offered as options. (Note: The six color options for the MyStyle Accent Color Kits were Smokey Quartz (gray; standard color for all models), Emerald Green, Ruby Red, Amber Orange, Sapphire Blue and Amethyst Purple.) One out of the five optional colors were also included with some 5000 and 7000 models purchased between 2000 and 2001. Another set of removable faceplates and speaker grills known as the WildStyle Accent Color Kits was introduced in 2001 onwards exclusively for the 5000 series as an option, which featured inlaid graphics integrated into the design, and came with six different color options. (Note: The six color options for the WildStyle Accent Color Kits include Carbon Fiber, Burl Wood Grain, Brushed Steel, Cobalt Blue, Leopard and Light Wood Grain.)

The cases also had small translucent (later solid) plastic flip-open doors for the USB ports (and FireWire (IEEE 1394) ports on the 7000 series), as well as an optical disc holder on the bottom that is accessible by a colored translucent door that matched with the other faceplates. It can store up to five discs, with one being directly integrated into the case itself while the other four were on two separate double-sided disc holders. As part of an effort to improve the ease-of-use for users upgrading their hardware, a subset of tool-less "easy access" designs were integrated into the case, such as the inclusion of removable, "screwless" drive rails to facilitate easier removal of disk drives and optical drives.

Beginning with the "Series 3" generation in 1998, the Presario brand of computers were designed and marketed with a big focus on internet connectivity in mind, being released at a time when the internet was steadily growing in popularity in the late-1990s and the early-2000s. The 5000 and 7000 series were no exception to this, and both models included an Ethernet card alongside a dial-up modem as standard equipment, had keyboards with additional buttons that would link to internet-related functions, and even included a Logitech QuickCam webcam in select models, allowing for such things like videoconferencing, among others.

==== Compaq Presario 8000 ====
The Compaq Presario 8000 was a series of desktop computers produced between 2001 and 2002 by Compaq, and from 2002 to 2006 by HP. It was introduced alongside the refreshed 5000 series on September 24, 2001, replacing the previous Compaq Presario 7000 series as the new high-end computer in Compaq's lineup at the time, also serving as a niche product for the high-end performance market.

Compared to the 5000 and the previous 7000 series, the towers of the 8000 series have been redesigned, largely based on the towers of the Compaq Evo series of business computers, albeit in a beige form factor. The towers themselves used a modular case design that can function as either a desktop or a tower. Due to the new design, the case does not use the translucent colored plastic faceplates of the 5000 and the previous 7000 series. Later models of the 8000 series (as well as other desktop computers in the "Series 5" lineup) would adopt the same black and silver color scheme as used by the Evo series among other models in Compaq's lineup. The 8000 series can hold up to two 5.25-inch drive bays and one 3.5-inch drive bay, and featured at least three IEEE 1394 (FireWire) ports, with one built into the case and another via a PCI expansion card.

Hardware-wise, processor options ranged from the Pentium 4 for Intel-powered models, and the Athlon and Athlon XP for AMD-powered models. Much like the preceding 7000 series, it featured discrete graphics cards only with no integrated options available. Discrete graphics card options ranged from the low-end GeForce 2 MX to the high-end GeForce 3 Ti200/Ti500 and Radeon All-In-Wonder. Unlike the previous 7000 series, however, it featured integrated audio as standard, which used SoundMAX II/III AC'97 sound drivers; a Creative Sound Blaster Live! Value 5.1 sound card was also offered as an option, with some later 8000 series models including a Creative Sound Blaster Audigy sound card. Like other previously released models, the specs and features of the 8000 series can also be configured by the user via Compaq's build-to-order program known as "Built For You", which can be found via kiosks in retail stores or on Compaq's website. All models came with Windows XP Home Edition preinstalled, with Windows XP Professional being offered as an option for select 8000 series models.

The 8000 series was produced concurrently with the value-oriented 5000 series, which continued to be produced with upgrades made to support newer hardware at the time due to its popularity. The other models, which consisted of the value-oriented 4000 series in 2001, and the mid-range 6000 series in 2002, were also produced.

Production of the 8000 series (as well as other models in the "Series 5" generation) continued under Compaq's ownership until May 8, 2002, a few days after the completion of HP's acquisition of Compaq on May 3, 2002, and a day after the newly-merged company was launched on May 7, 2002, when they were released under the ownership of HP. These models lasted until they were discontinued in favor of newer models on January 29, 2006.

=== Model number suffixes ===
Beginning in 1998 with the "Series 3" Presario computers, a one, two, or three letter suffix located on the model number, if present, indicates special information about the computer as well as indicating what features the computer may have, such as the type of processor used and/or the country it was offered in. In most models, these suffixes would be affixed to the model number in the following format:

----xxx

Where "----" indicates the model number in four digits and "xxx" is a one/two/three letter suffix (e.g. 7000T, 7000US, 5101RSH). This format may differ from model to model.

The following chart below describes each of these suffixes. Most of these would later be inherited by HP after their 2002 merger with Compaq, while some of these suffixes were introduced post-merger.

- T: Intel-based processor
- Z: AMD-based processor
- i, N, Y: Configure To Order (CTO), "Built For You"
- CL: Club model offered exclusively in discount shopping clubs (e.g. Sam's Club, Costco, etc.)
- SE, SE1: Special Edition
- WM: Model offered exclusively to Walmart retailers
- RSH: Model offered exclusively to RadioShack retailers
- V, A, C, F, R, X, AX, KS, LS, IL, NL, NX, SR: Unknown
- etc.

These suffixes describes the country (or region) that the computer was sold to.

- US: United States
- CA: Canada
- LA: Latin America
- EA/(E/e + a letter): Western & Eastern Europe
- AU/AN: Asia/Australia
- JP: Japan
- etc.

== Notebooks ==
The Compaq Presario lineup also includes laptop and notebook computers, which are produced since 1996. Some laptop models of the brand were rebrandings of Compaq's other laptop computers such as those from the Compaq Evo series, whilst others produced after the 2002 merger between HP and Compaq were rebranded HP laptop computers such as the Pavilion.

=== Notebook series ===
(Note that is a non-exhaustive list and may never satisfy completeness but shows some of the more or less common models of laptops and notebooks under the Presario brand.)

- Compaq Presario 300
- Compaq Presario 700 series
  - Compaq Presario 722US
- Compaq Presario 800
- Compaq Presario 900 (Note: Rebranded as "Evo N1005" in the Compaq Evo series)
- Compaq Presario 1000 series
  - Compaq Presario 1010
  - Compaq Presario 1020
  - Compaq Presario 1030
- Compaq Presario 1200 series
  - Compaq Presario 1200CA
  - Compaq Presario 1200US
  - Compaq Presario 1200CL
  - Compaq Presario 1200SR
  - Compaq Presario 1200RSH
  - Compaq Presario 1200T
  - Compaq Presario 1200TA
  - Compaq Presario 1200Z
  - Compaq Presario 1200ZA
- Compaq Presario 1400
- Compaq Presario 1500 (Note: Rebranded as "Evo N1000/N1020" in the Compaq Evo series)
- Compaq Presario 1600
- Compaq Presario 1700 series
  - Compaq Presario 1700CA
  - Compaq Presario 1700US
  - Compaq Presario 1700CL
  - Compaq Presario 1700SR
  - Compaq Presario 1700RSH
  - Compaq Presario 1700T
  - Compaq Presario 1700TA
- Compaq Presario 1800 series
  - Compaq Presario 1800US
  - Compaq Presario 1800CL
  - Compaq Presario 1800SR
  - Compaq Presario 1800RSH
  - Compaq Presario 1800T
  - Compaq Presario 1800TA
- Compaq Presario 1900
- Compaq Presario 2100
- Compaq Presario 2200
- Compaq Presario 2500
- Compaq Presario 2700
- Compaq Presario 2800 (Note: Rebranded as "Evo N800" in the Compaq Evo series)
- Compaq Presario 2900
- Compaq Presario 3000
- Compaq Presario A900
- Compaq Presario C300 series
  - Compaq Presario C304NR
- Compaq Presario C500 series
  - Compaq Presario C502TU
- Compaq Presario C700 series
  - Compaq Presario C742TU
  - Compaq Presario C762NR
  - Compaq Presario C769US
- Compaq Presario CQ20
- Compaq Presario CQ35
- Compaq Presario CQ40
- Compaq Presario CQ41
- Compaq Presario CQ42
- Compaq Presario CQ43
- Compaq Presario CQ45
- Compaq Presario CQ50
- Compaq Presario CQ56
- Compaq Presario CQ57
- Compaq Presario CQ58
- Compaq Presario CQ60
- Compaq Presario CQ61
- Compaq Presario CQ62
- Compaq Presario CQ70
- Compaq Presario CQ71
- Compaq Presario F500
- Compaq Presario F700 series
  - Compaq Presario F706LA
- Compaq Presario M2000
- Compaq Presario R3000 (Note: Rebranded as "HP Compaq nx9100" in the HP Compaq series)
- Compaq Presario R4000
- Compaq Presario V1000
- Compaq Presario V2000 (Note: Rebranded as "HP Pavilion dv1000" and "HP Pavilion ze2000" in the HP Pavilion series, "Presario ze2000" in the Compaq Presario series, and as "HP Compaq nx4800" in the HP Compaq series)
- Compaq Presario V3000
- Compaq Presario V3500
- Compaq Presario V4000
- Compaq Presario V5000
- Compaq Presario V6000
- Compaq Presario X1000
- Compaq Presario X6000 (Note: Rebranded as "HP Compaq nx9600" in the HP Compaq series)
- Compaq Presario X6001
- Compaq Presario ze2000 (Note: Rebranded as "HP Pavilion dv1000" and "HP Pavilion ze2000" in the HP Pavilion series, "Presario V2000" in the Compaq Presario series, and as "HP Compaq nx4800" in the HP Compaq series)

=== Model number suffixes ===
Beginning in 1998 with the "Series 3" Presario computers, a one, two, or three letter suffix located on the model number, if present, indicates special information about the computer as well as indicating what features the computer may have, such as the type of processor used and/or the country it was offered in. These suffixes were usually affixed after the model number in many models.

The following chart below describes each of these suffixes. Most of these would later be inherited by HP after their 2002 merger with Compaq, while some of these suffixes were introduced post-merger. See the Model number suffixes section under "Desktop PC series" above for more info.

- T: Intel-based processor
- Z: AMD-based processor
- TA: Configure To Order (CTO) ("Built For You") models with an Intel-based processor
- ZA: Configure To Order (CTO) ("Built For You") models with an AMD-based processor
- NR: No rebate model
- CL: Club model offered exclusively in discount shopping clubs (e.g. Sam's Club, Costco, etc.)
- RSH: Model offered exclusively to RadioShack retailers
- SR: Unknown
- etc.

These suffixes describes the country (or region) that the computer was sold to.

- US: United States
- CA: Canada
- LA: Latin America
- EA: Western & Eastern Europe
- AU/AX: Asia/Australia (AU = AMD processors with UMA graphics; AX = AMD processors with discrete graphics)
- TU/TX: Asia/Australia (TU = Intel processors with UMA graphics; TX = Intel processors with discrete graphics)
- etc.

== All-in-one ==
From 1993 up until mid 1998, all-in-one computers from the Compaq Presario lineup were produced. These contained the PC and the monitor all within the same unit.

=== All-in-one series ===
- Compaq Presario 400 series
  - Compaq Presario 425
  - Compaq Presario 433
  - Compaq Presario 460
- Compaq Presario 3000 series
  - Compaq Presario 3020
  - Compaq Presario 3060
- Compaq Presario 4400 series
  - Compaq Presario 4402
  - Compaq Presario 4410
- Compaq Presario 5500 series
  - Compaq Presario 5520
  - Compaq Presario 5522
  - Compaq Presario 5528
  - Compaq Presario 5536
- Compaq Presario CDS/CDTV series
  - Compaq Presario CDS 510
  - Compaq Presario CDS 520
  - Compaq Presario CDS 524
  - Compaq Presario CDS 526
  - Compaq Presario CDTV 520
  - Compaq Presario CDTV 524
  - Compaq Presario CDTV 528

== Monitors ==
Various computer monitors of different display types and sizes have been produced under the Compaq Presario brand since the introduction of "Series 2" Presario computers in 1996. These include cathode ray tube (CRT) or liquid crystal display (LCD) monitors, and are also known as the "Compaq Presario Multimedia" monitors. New monitors within the Compaq Presario brand were usually introduced at the start of each generation, while some monitors were introduced mid-generation.

Timeline

- 1996–1998 – 1x25, FXx00
- 1998–1999 – MVx00, FPx00
- 1999–2000 – MVx20, MVx30, FPx20
- 2000–2002 – MVx40, CVx35, FSx40, FPx40

=== 1x25 and FXx00 series ===
The 1X25 monitors were the first monitors made by Compaq under the Presario brand in 1996, succeeding the previous monitors that were used by the Presario brand since its inception in 1993. Designed for use with "Series 2" designed Presarios such as the Compaq Presario 4100, 4700, 6700, and 8700 series as well as the later 4500, 4600, and 4800 series, These monitors all shared the same design cues from the towers they were meant to match: all of them had a split lower bezel which ran down the middle. Featuring a cathode ray tube (CRT) with sizes ranging from 14 to 17 inches, the monitors had analog dials for brightness and contrast, plus a volume dial for speakers, which also acts as a power button when pressed. It also has a mute button for the volume on the left side of the monitor, and featured four additional analog dials behind the bottom panel for manual display adjustment (these were replaced with digital controls on the 1725 model). An on-screen display similar to that of contemporary televisions of the era is also included, used to display volume adjustment controls. The monitors also have a built-in microphone located on the top of each monitor.

There is also a very rare set of monitors (the FX series) which are all black and had built-in speakers and a subwoofer, plus three extra USB ports. They are designed to go with the 4800 series Presario multimedia towers (specifically the 4830 to 4882), as they were all black just like the FX monitors.

- Compaq Presario 1425
- Compaq Presario 1525
- Compaq Presario 1725
- Compaq Presario 1725b
- Compaq Presario FX500
- Compaq Presario FX700

All of these monitors came with JBL Pro speakers which could be mounted to the sides of the monitors. The FX is the only exception, which had built-in JBL Pro-powered speakers with a subwoofer in the rear of the casing.

=== MVx00 and FPx00 series ===
The MVX00 and FPX00 monitors were the second monitors made under the Compaq Presario brand in 1998, designed to be sold with "Series 3" designed Compaq towers as well as some "Series 2" designed Presarios such as the Presario 2254, 2255, and 2256. Like the previous monitors before it, these monitors were designed to match the design cues of that generation of Presarios. Offered in sizes ranging from 14 to 19 inches for CRTs, the MVX00 monitors had their brightness and contrast dials of the previous monitors removed in favor of digital controls accessible by a button on the monitor. The four hidden dials for display adjustment as previously featured on the 1425 and 1525 monitors were also replaced with the aforementioned digital controls as well. Much like the previous 1725 monitor that came before it, six LED lights were present on the MV500 monitor, indicating the type of control being used, however these were replaced in favor of on-screen display digital controls on the MV700 and MV900 monitors. The volume dial (which acted as a power button) and mute buttons from the previous monitor were also removed, with a standard power button in place of the volume dial. The MV700 and MV900 monitors also featured a dedicated degauss button, and the built-in microphone from previous monitors was retained, located on the top of the monitor.

Flat panel displays were introduced during this generation of monitors, featuring a flat panel liquid crystal display (LCD). They were one of the first flat panel monitors to be offered for a home consumer PC. These monitors are designated with the letters FP, with sizes ranging from 15 to 17 inches.

- Compaq Presario MV400
- Compaq Presario MV500
- Compaq Presario MV700
- Compaq Presario MV900
- Compaq Presario FP500
- Compaq Presario FP700
- Compaq Presario FP5315

As with the previous monitors, they came with JBL Pro speakers which could be mounted to the sides of the monitors (with the exception of the FP series).

=== MVx20, CVx20, MVx30, and FPx20 series ===
The MVX20 and CVx20 monitors were the third monitors made by Compaq for the Presario brand in 1999, designed for use with "Series 4" designed Presarios. Like previous Presario monitors, these were designed to match with that generation of Presarios as they shared the same design cues. With sizes ranging from 14 to 19 inches, all of the monitors featured on-screen display digital controls as opposed to the six LED lights on the MV500 monitor that indicated the type of control being used. As with previous Presario monitors, these monitors featured a built-in microphone within the monitor. Starting with this generation of monitors, the "Presario" name was dropped, leaving only the Compaq logo and the model number on the monitors.

An exclusive set of monitors introduced during this generation was the MVX30 monitors, introduced in early 2000 with the release of a singular model, the MV730i. Offered in a singular size of 17 inches, it was similar to the MVX20 monitors except with a refreshed frontal design that shed most of its boxy-styled angular design from this generation of monitors in favor of a more curvature exterior. The monitor stands were also refreshed in the same design language as the front portion of the monitor, while the rear portion retained its angular box design found in previous monitors as well as other monitors in the lineup. An on-screen display with digital controls and a built-in microphone were standard, and featured silver accenting on the microphone and power buttons. It was designed for use with the EZ2000 series of Presarios as it shares some design cues from the monitor it was made to go for, and served as a precursor to what would eventually become the MVX40, CVX35, and FSX40 monitors, which used the same design aesthetics.

Flat panel displays continued to be offered with this generation of monitors, designated with the letters FP. Only one size was offered, a 17-inch LCD.

- Compaq Presario MV420
- Compaq Presario MV520
- Compaq Presario MV720
- Compaq Presario MV730i
- Compaq Presario MV920
- Compaq Presario CV520
- Compaq Presario CV720
- Compaq Presario FP720

Unlike the 1X25 and MVX00 monitors, however, these monitors (aside from the FP series) lacked the side mounting holes for the speakers, and instead relied on separate JBL Pro speakers, which were redesigned to match the monitors and towers but are not mountable. The EZ2000 series also came with the same JBL Pro speakers offered in this generation but with blue speaker grills instead of gray.

=== MVx40, CVx35, FSx40, and FPx40 series ===
The MVX40, CVX35 and FSX40 monitors were the fourth and final monitors made by Compaq under the Presario brand prior to its acquisition by HP in 2002, and was produced in mid-2000. These monitors were designed to be used with "Series 5" designed Presarios such as the sleek and stylish Compaq Presario 5000 and 7000 series as well as the later 4000 and 8000 series. Featuring sizes ranging from 15 to 19 inches, the monitors were refreshed with the release of the 5000 and 7000 series, which were mostly similar in design to the previous MVX20 monitors but with a more curvature exterior instead of the boxy-styled angular design of previous monitors, fitting in with the design cues of the 5000 and 7000 series. This new design was similar to the MVX30 monitors that came before it, with a singular model (MV730i) featuring mostly the same design aesthetics as with this generation of monitors. The majority of these monitors continued to use a built-in microphone as with previous monitors, and all of the MVX40 and FSX40 monitors featured silver accents on the microphone and power buttons. The CVX35 monitors lacked the built-in microphone the MVX40 and FSX40 monitors had, as well as the silver accents being replaced with the ones that matched the monitor's casing. All monitors featured on-screen displays with digital controls as standard.

Flat-screen displays were introduced alongside the MVX40 monitors and are designated with the letters FS, using a flat-screen CRT. Two sizes were available, 17 and 19 inch CRTs respectively. Flat panel displays were also available, designated with the letters FP. Only one size was available, a 17-inch LCD.

- Compaq Presario MV540
- Compaq Presario MV740
- Compaq Presario MV940
- Compaq Presario CV535
- Compaq Presario CV735
- Compaq Presario CV935
- Compaq Presario FP745A
- Compaq Presario FS740
- Compaq Presario FS940

Unlike with the preceding MVX20 and MVX30 monitors, these monitors had the side mounts for the speakers as with the 1X25 and MVX00 monitors, since all of these monitors came with JBL Platinum Series speakers that could be mounted on the sides of the monitors. The speakers also featured removable speaker grills that were offered in the same six color configuration as with the 5000 and 7000 series, matching with the case design of the aforementioned models. One out of the six colors was used as the default color for all retail models while the other five colors were offered as options. It also has a line-in jack for audio input, allowing for other audio sources to be used for output via the speakers. The FP745A is the only exception, since it has integrated speakers built into the monitor.

== See also ==
- List of Hewlett-Packard products
