= Compaq Presario R3000 =

Line of laptops produced by HP

- Developer: Hewlett-Packard
- Product family: Compaq Presario
- Type: Laptop
- Released: March 2004; 22 years ago
- Operating system: Windows XP (Note: Optionally can be installed with Windows 98, Windows 2000, Windows Me)
- CPU: Intel Celeron, Intel Pentium 4 or Athlon XP
- Memory: 128 MB (expandable to 2 GB)
- Storage: 30/40/60/80 GB HDD @ 4,200/5,400 rpm
- Display: 15.4"
- Graphics: Nvidia GeForce 4 or ATI Radeon 9000/9100

The Compaq Presario R3000 was a model series of laptops manufactured by Hewlett-Packard Company under the Compaq Presario brand that featured 16:10 15.4" diagonal displays. An equivalent HP Compaq-branded model, the HP Compaq nx9100 series, was also produced.

Featuring a silver finish with a black bottom, the R3000 series contained a selection of Intel or AMD processors, 128 MB to 2 GB of DDR RAM (with some being reserved for graphics memory), an integrated ATI Mobility Radeon 9000 or Radeon 9100 or an Nvidia GeForce Go 4 graphics chip, an integrated Analog Devices sound chip, hard drives with a 30 to 80 GB capacity, a 15.4" liquid crystal display (LCD), built-in JBL Pro speakers, and weighs about 10 lb (4.5 kg). Certain configurations include an integrated Broadcom 54G wireless networking card. Connection ports include USB, Parallel, Firewire, 3.5 mm headphone output, 3.5 mm microphone input, and S-Video and VGA outputs.

Unique to the R3000 series (as well as all of HP's other laptops of the time) was a proprietary docking station port (Note: There was no official name given for the proprietary docking port on the R3000/nx9100 unlike later HP/Compaq laptops which have docking ports labeled as "PCI expansion port 2" or "PCI expansion port 3".) (known as a "module port" in HP's documentation) that allows for the use of a port replicator such as HP's Expansion Dock that provides additional ports and other features. A standard DVD-ROM/CD-RW combo drive up to a DVD+RW/CD-RW drive at varying speeds were also available as standard options.

The R3000 series primarily came with Windows XP preinstalled, however users can also install older versions of Windows such as Windows 98, Windows 2000 and Windows Me on them as the hardware contains driver support for these legacy versions. These operating systems can also be installed from the factory by the user if they so choose.
