= Compaq Presario 1200 =

Line of laptops produced by Compaq

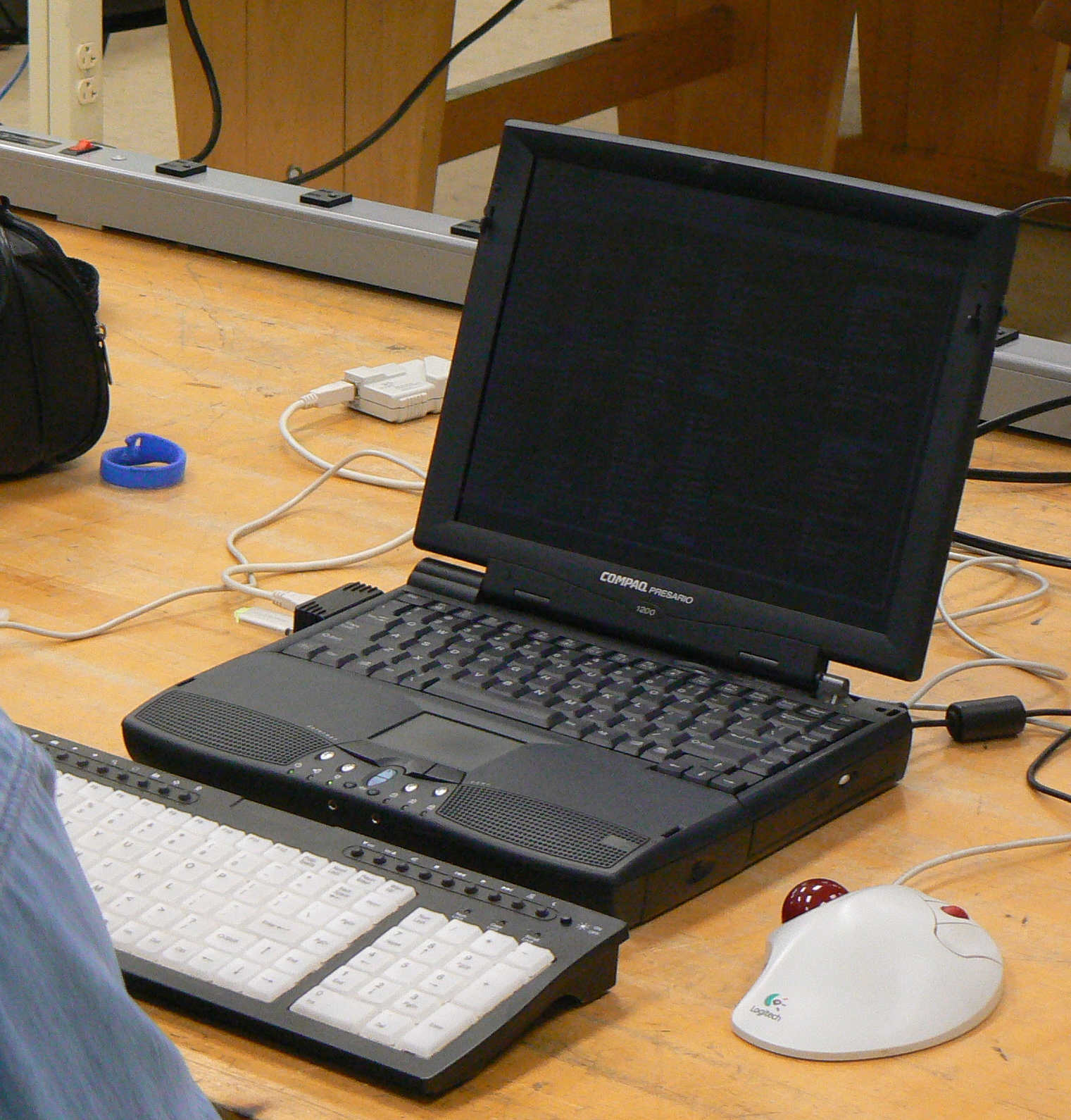
- Compaq Presario 1200
- Developer: Compaq
- Type: Laptop
- Released: 1998
- Lifespan: 1998-2000
- Discontinued: 2000
- Operating system: Windows 98, Windows 2000, Windows Me
- CPU: AMD K6-2, Intel Celeron, Pentium II, Pentium III
- Display: 12.1"/13.0"

The Compaq Presario 1200 was a line of notebook computers produced between 1998 and 2000 by Compaq as part of Compaq Presario line.

The Presario 1200 line of notebook computers were originally noted for their AMD processors, light weight and 12-inch LCD screens, while later models included a shift to Intel processors and other changed features. The Compaq Presario 1200 series features a vast set of model numbers and revisions, many of which are not totally compatible, even though the machines share the same general Presario model number.

== Specification ==
The range came with Toshiba HDDs and optical media drives, available as 24X CD-ROMs or 4X DVD-ROMs. Hard drives ranged from 3 to 10 GB and ran at a slow 3300 RPM across the range. This could have been due to noise limitations, as the series is noted for its low noise output. Screens were available as 12.1 / 13.0 inch LCDs yet screen housing varied from model to model. The 1245 and 1246 had very different screen housing to the 1200 and the 1200XL which came with the 13 inch screen. The 1200 also had a silver housing whereas all other models came in black. Screens for this series are notable for their banding and white edges which appear more evident as the machine ages, the backlight at the sides clearly visible. Memory expansion was available on the bottom of the units, allowing up to 128MB of additional SODIMM memory to be added. All models came equipped with a Floppy Disk Drive, VGA output and PC Card slot as standard. They also came with on-board JBL stereo speakers and Synaptics touchpads. These systems were preinstalled with Windows 98, Windows Me or Windows 2000 Professional. They were supplied with a Quick Restore disc which returned the system to its factory condition in the event of change of ownership, wish to reinstall the OS or system failure.

These later models are often noted for having a silver display lid instead of the original black lid.

=== Processors ===
Many original models of the Presario 1200 series ran on AMD K6-2 processors, which was quite an adventurous move at a time when AMD was very much second place to the dominant market leader Intel. The chips were notable for their inclusion of 3DNow! technology, enabling marked performance increases from the original K6. The chips came in a variety of speeds, ranging from 333 MHz to 550 MHz, however performance varied only slightly between models.

A number of Presario 1200 series notebooks exist with Intel Celeron, Pentium II or Pentium III processors as well, usually found in the later designs.

== Models ==
=== 1200-XL110 ===
Priced at £1200, the 1200 contained a Type 2 Cardbus slot, PS2 serial port, 1 x USB port, and 3 x Game MRI Slots.

- processor: 500 MHz AMD K6-2
- RAM: 64 MB
- Storage: 1 GB Toshiba HDD
  - CD drive, 3.5" Floppy Disk Drive
- Screen: 12.1" LCD
- Lithium Ion battery
- Onboard speakers

=== 1200-XL125 ===
Originally priced at $1,699, the 1200-XL125 (designated with model number "12XL125") had:

- processor: 533 MHz AMD K6-2+ (some had the K6-III CPU)
- RAM: 64 MB on-board (expandable to 192 MB)
- Storage: 6 GB Toshiba HDD
  - 6x Toshiba DVD-ROM drive
- Screen: 13.3" LCD
- Video: Trident CyberBlade i7
- 1 x Type II/III PCMCIA card slot
- 56K Modem
- JBL stereo speakers

=== 1200-XL300 ===
The 1200-XL300 (designated with model number "12XL325") is one of the newer models in the 1200 series. The features in the 1246 are generally mirrored in the 1200-XL325, with the most notable differences being the change to an Intel processor architecture. Physical differences include a silver lid, different display hinge configuration, and a slightly rearranged motherboard layout. These changes render this generation of Presario 1200 distinctly incompatible at the component level with most of its predecessors. The major differences in the hardware of the 1200-XL325 were:

- processor: 650 MHz Intel Pentium III mobile
- RAM: 64 MB on-board (expandable to 320 MB)
- Storage: 6 GB HDD
  - DVD-ROM drive
- 1 x Type II/III PCMCIA card slot
- No CompactFlash slot as in the 1245
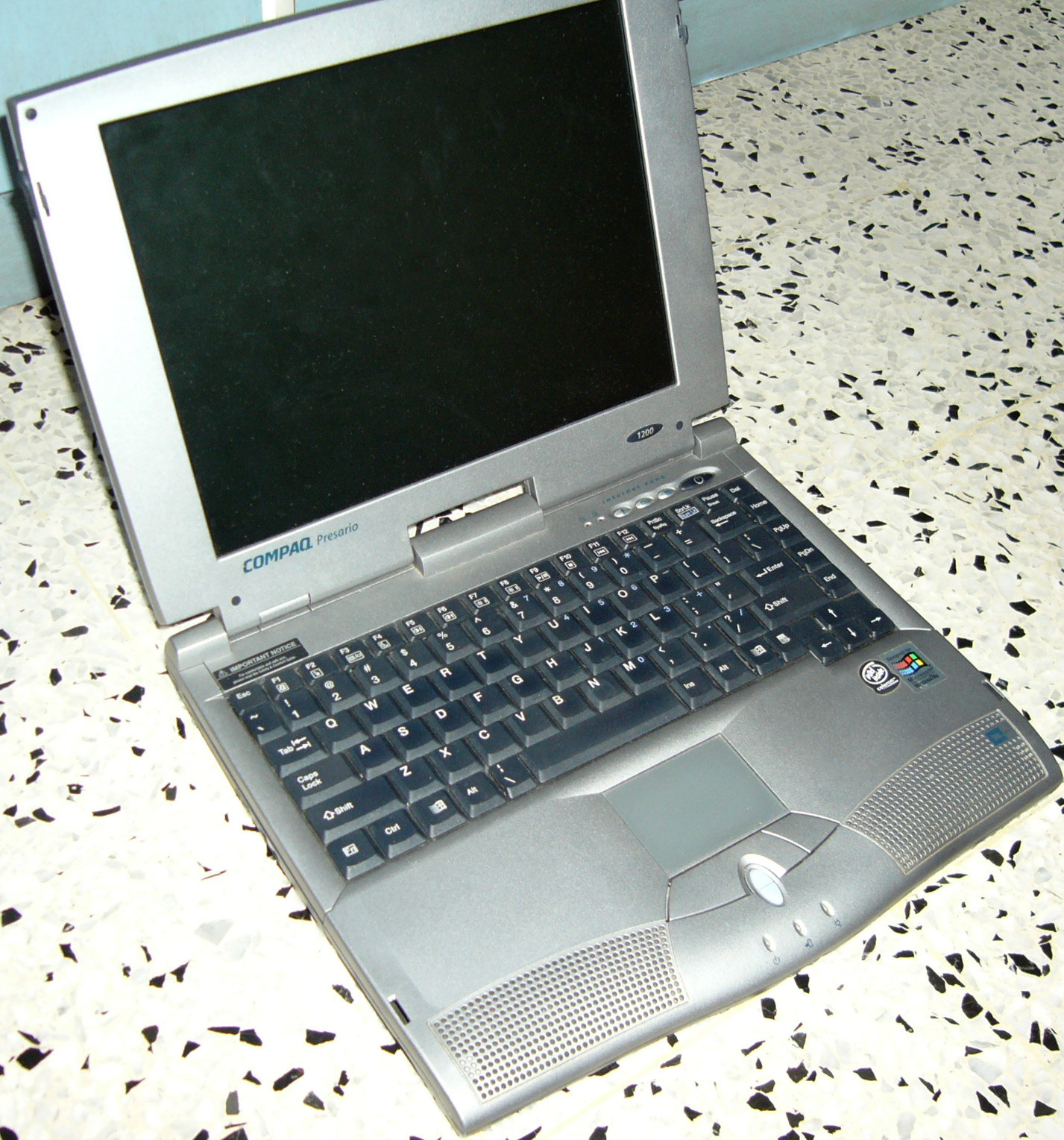
  A Compaq Presario 1200 notebook with 12" LCD

=== 1200-XL405A ===
The 1200-XL405A (designated with model number "12XL405A") is another model using an Intel processor; it is similar in layout to the XL325 above. The motherboard is equipped with a Socket-370 ZIF CPU socket and uses a VIA PLE133 chipset (comprising the VT8601 North Bridge and VT82C686A South Bridge) with graphics provided via the Trident Cyberblade-i1 controller (8MB VRAM) integrated into the VT8601 circuitry. It measures 5cm x 31cm x 25.6cm and weighs 3.3 kilograms.

- processor: 700 MHz Intel Celeron (Coppermine, 128 kB L2 cache, 66 MHz system bus)
- RAM: 64 MB on-board; 1 x SDRAM SO-DIMM PC100 slot (expandable to 320 MB total) SyncDRAM standard
- Storage: 6 GB HDD
  - 24x CD-ROM drive
- 1 x Type II/III PCMCIA card slot
- 12.1" TFT Active Matrix Display
- No CompactFlash slot as in the 1245

There is a model named "12XL402" which has a mix of parts from the 502 and 405 as well as the XL302 listed below. This model has a 700 MHz Coppermine Celeron in a Socket 370, an Askey Modem, a DVD-ROM device (labeled as 'DVD' on the lid, System Information lists it as a CD-ROM), silver lid (Like the 502A) and a floppy drive. This laptop is equipped with a Trident Cyberblade i1 GPU similarly to the XL405A.

=== 1200-XL502A ===
Although similar in hardware to the XL405A, the XL502A (model number "12XL502A") is an upgraded model, based on its brother. Most notorious is the inclusion of a MiniPCI slot on the bottom, the presence of a slightly faster processor, and the color of the case (silver lid was maintained, the rest of the case is all-black). Firsts units of this model originally came with a Ni-MH battery pack, while later ones came with a more dependable Li-Ion one. Both types were available for purchase, and obviously they fitted in all of the 1200-series. One interesting thing about this specific model is its support for Pentium III processors up to 1Ghz, but only for Coppermine cores and at the expense of massive heat & battery power draw increase.

- processor: 766 MHz Intel Celeron (Coppermine, 128 kB L2 cache)
- RAM: 64 MB on-board; 1 x SDRAM SO-DIMM PC133 slot (max.memory up to 320MB)
- Storage: 6 GB HDD
  - 24x CD-ROM drive
- MiniPCI slot (allowing for example a wireless card, but no antenna nor connectors were installed in the case)
- 1 x Type II/III PCMCIA card slot

There is a 1200-XL302 (with model number "12XL302") too. It is equipped similarly to the XL502A - with the difference of having a Celeron processor running at 600 MHz and an AsKey modem in the MiniPCi slot.

=== 1215 ===
The Presario 1215 is equipped with AMD's Mobile Athlon 4 processor. It also comes equipped with a DVD/CD-RW combo. Early prototypes featured as low as 96MB of RAM, however retail configurations were packed with 128 MB, 64 MB non-removable and 64 MB removable. The Compaq Presario 1215 ships with Windows Me and is preloaded with software such as Microsoft Works, Microsoft Money and Adaptec's Easy CD Creator 4.

- processor: 1 GHz AMD Mobile Athlon 4 (64 kB L1 cache, 1 or 2 MB L2 cache)
- RAM: 128MB (max.memory up to 320MB)
- Operating System: Windows Me preinstalled

=== 1220 ===
The Compaq Presario 1220 was manufactured in 1998 and was part of a limited amount of Compaq computers that utilized a Cyrix processor.

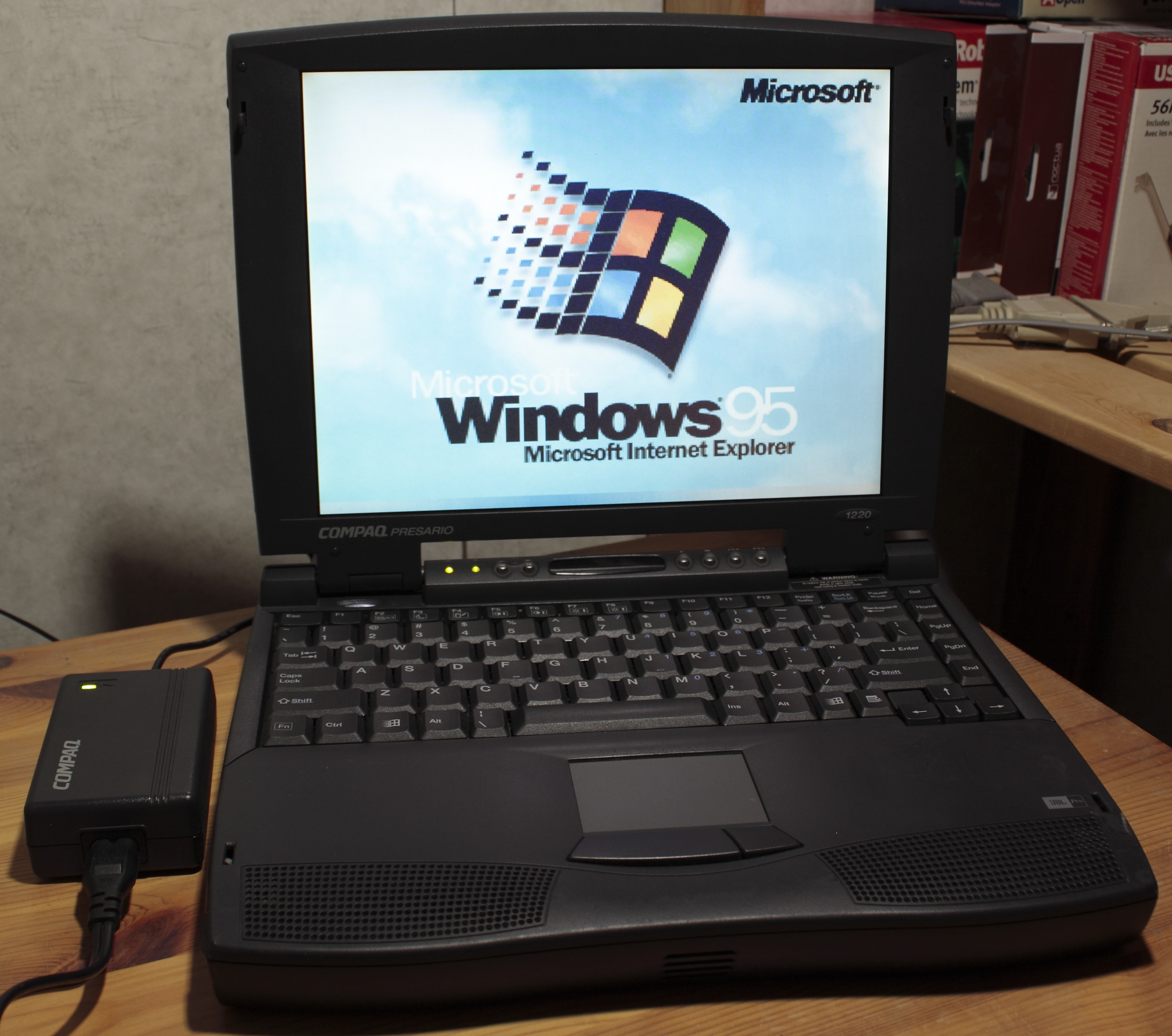
A Compaq Presario 1220 running Windows 95 OSR2

- Processor: 200 MHz Cyrix 200GXm
- RAM: 32 MB; upgradeable to 96 MB
- Storage: 2.1 or 4.1 GB HDD
  - 20× CD-ROM drive, 3.5" floppy disk drive
- 12" HPA Pasive matrix display
- 56k V92 internal modem
- Phone (RJ-11) jack
- VGA video output
- JBL Pro stereo speakers
- Parallel port
- Type II PCMCIA card slot
- Combined PS/2 Keyboard & Mouse Port
- RS-232 Serial COM port
- Operating System: Windows 95 preinstalled

=== 1230 ===
The Compaq Presario 1230 was manufactured in 1998, had an MMX Intel processor and was known for its "3D sound" speakers.

- processor: 266 MHz MMX Intel
- RAM: 64 MB
- Storage: 4 GB HDD
  - 24× CD-ROM drive, 3.5" floppy disk drive
- Phone (RJ-11) jack
- VGA video output
- 3D sound speakers
- USB 1.0 port
- PS/2 Keyboard & Mouse Port
- Operating System: Windows 98 preinstalled

=== 1245 ===
Priced at an RRP of £1000, the 1245 came equipped with:

- processor: 333 MHz AMD K6-2
- RAM: 32MB On-board (expandable to 160MB)
- Storage: 3.0 GB Toshiba HDD
  - 24x Toshiba CD-ROM drive, 3.5" Floppy Disk Drive
- Screen: 12.1" LCD
- PC Card slot
- VGA video output
- Serial Port
- NIMH battery
- JBL stereo speakers

=== 1246 ===
The next model up from the 1245, the 1246 offered a new processor, bigger HDD, CF card slot and fold-down feet for desktop operation. Aesthetically, the 1246 was almost identical to the 1245. Screens were the same, cases were highly similar and many components were interchangeable with those of the 1245 (such as the LCD inverters, processors and housing). In addition to the aforementioned 1245 spec, the 1246 offered:

- processor: 400 MHz AMD K6-2
- Storage: 4.3 GB Toshiba HDD
- Dual motherboard fans
- CF card slot in addition to PC card slot
- Fold-down desktop mounted feet
- L-Ion Battery

=== 1260 ===
Almost technically identical to the 1245, the 1260 borrowed its 333 MHz AMD K6-2 processor, 64MB RAM and ATI Rage II Graphics chip.

- processor: 333 MHz AMD K6-2
- RAM: 64 MB SO-DIMM
- Storage: 4 GB Toshiba HDD
  - 24X Toshiba CD-Rom Drive, Floppy Disk Drive
- Cardbus PCMCIA Slot
- 7.5 lb (3.4 kg)
- Operating System: Windows 98 preinstalled

== Known Problems ==
Compaq Presario 1200 laptops are often found with damaged power jacks. Some of these power jacks appear to have been blown in half due to some sort of short; others rip their copper traces off of the motherboard due to stress placed on the power jack. Presario 1200 laptops typically have four tiny copper rings embedded in the motherboard behind the power jack that can be used to reattach a slightly damaged power jack and repair the failing unit.
The LCD Power Inverter cable (which runs through the hinge from the base to the screen), is very susceptible to damage, given the strain of bending when closing the lid. The cable is a 6-strand ribbon variety, and therefore soldering is all but impossible.

== See also ==
- Compaq Presario
- AMD K6-2
