= List of Hewlett-Packard products =

The following is a partial list of products manufactured under the Hewlett-Packard brand.

== Printers ==
HP categories of printers as of November 2014 are:

- Black and white laser printers
- Color laser printers
- Laser multifunction printers
- Inkjet all-in-one printers
- Specialty Photo inkjet printers
- Business ink printers
- Color inkjet printers
- HP Designjet large format printers
- HP Indigo Digital Presses
- HP Inkjet Digital Web Press
- HP latex printers
- HP Scitex large format printers
- Network print servers

=== Black and white laser printers ===
Current line (November 2014):

High-volume black and white laser printers

- LaserJet 700 printer
- LaserJet M806 printer

Office black and white laser printers

- LaserJet 400 printer
- LaserJet 600 printer
- LaserJet P2000 printer
- LaserJet P3000 prin

=== Color laser printers ===
(As of November 2014)

High-volume color laser printers
- Color LaserJet M651 printer
- Color LaserJet M750 printer
- Color LaserJet M855 printer

Office color laser printers

- Color LaserJet CP4000 printer
- Color LaserJet CP5000 printer
- LaserJet 200 color printer
- LaserJet 300/400 color printer
- LaserJet 500 color printer

Personal color laser printers

- LaserJet CP1020 color printer

=== Laser multifunction printers ===
(As of November 2014)

High-volume laser multifunction printers
- Color LaserJet flow Multifunction Printer M880
- Color LaserJet Multifunction M680 Printer
- LaserJet 600 Multifunction Printer
- LaserJet 700 color Multifunction Printer
- LaserJet 700 Multifunction Printer
- LaserJet flow Multifunction Printer M830

Office laser multifunction printers

- Color LaserJet CM4540 Multifunction Printer
- LaserJet 200 color Multifunction Printer
- LaserJet 300/400 color Multifunction Printer
- LaserJet 400 Multifunction Printer
- LaserJet 500 color Multifunction Printer
- LaserJet 500 Multifunction Printer
- LaserJet Pro 400 Multifunction Printer
- LaserJet Pro 500 color Multifunction Printer
- LaserJet Pro 500 Multifunction Printer

Personal laser multifunction printers

- Color LaserJet Pro M170 Multifunction Printer
- LaserJet M1130 Multifunction Printer
- LaserJet Pro 100 Multifunction Printer
- LaserJet Pro 200 Multifunction Printer

Discontinued models

- LaserJet 3050 AIO
- LaserJet 3055 AIO
- LaserJet 4250n
- LaserJet 4250tn
- LaserJet 4250dtn
- LaserJet 4350n
- LaserJet 4350tn
- LaserJet II/IID/IIP
- LaserJet III/IIID/IIIP/IIISi
- LaserJet 4
- LaserJet 4M
- LaserJet 4 Plus
- LaserJet 4M Plus
- LaserJet 4Si
- LaserJet 4L
- LaserJet 4P
- LaserJet 4V
- LaserJet 4MV
- LaserJet 5
- LaserJet 5L
- LaserJet 5M
- LaserJet 5MP
- LaserJet 5N
- LaserJet 5P
- LaserJet 5se
- LaserJet 5Si
- LaserJet 5200
- LaserJet 5200tn
- LaserJet 5200dtn
- LaserJet 6L
- LaserJet 6MP
- LaserJet 1000 Printer
- LaserJet 1010 Printer series
- LaserJet 1012 Printer
- LaserJet 1015 Printer
- LaserJet 1018 Printer
- LaserJet 1020 Printer series
- LaserJet 1022 Printer series
- LaserJet 1150 Printer
- LaserJet 1160 Printer Series
- LaserJet 1200 Printer series
- LaserJet 1300 Printer series
- LaserJet 1320 Printer series
- LaserJet 2100 Printer series
- LaserJet 2200 Printer series
- LaserJet 2300 Printer series
- LaserJet 2400 Printer series
- LaserJet 4000 series
- LaserJet 4050 series
- LaserJet 4100 series
- LaserJet 4200 series
- LaserJet 4240 series
- LaserJet 4250 series
- LaserJet 4300 series
- LaserJet 4350 series
- LaserJet 5000 series
- LaserJet 5100 series
- LaserJet 8100 series
- LaserJet 8150 series
- LaserJet 9000 series
- LaserJet 9040 series
- LaserJet 9050 series
- LaserJet M1005 MFP
- LaserJet M1319f MFP
- LaserJet M1522n MFP
- LaserJet M1522nF MFP
- LaserJet M2727nF MFP
- LaserJet M3027 MFP
- LaserJet M3027x MFP
- LaserJet M3035 MFP
- LaserJet M3035xs MFP
- LaserJet P1005
- LaserJet P1006
- LaserJet P1102
- LaserJet P1102w
- LaserJet P1505
- LaserJet P1505n
- LaserJet P1606dn
- LaserJet P2015
- LaserJet P2015d
- LaserJet P2015dn
- LaserJet P2035n
- LaserJet P3005
- LaserJet P3005d
- LaserJet P3005n
- LaserJet P3005dn
- LaserJet P3005x
- LaserJet P3015d
- LaserJet P3015dn
- LaserJet P3015x
- LaserJet P4014n
- LaserJet P4015n
- LaserJet P4015x
- LaserJet P4515n
- LaserJet P4515tn
- LaserJet P4515x
- LaserJet P2055dn
- Color LaserJet
- Color LaserJet 2500 series
- Color LaserJet 2600n
- Color LaserJet 2605n
- Color LaserJet 2605dn
- Color LaserJet 2605dtn
- Color LaserJet 2820 AIO
- Color LaserJet 2840 AIO
- Color LaserJet 3000n
- Color LaserJet 3600n
- Color LaserJet 3600dn
- Color LaserJet 3500 series
- Color LaserJet 3700 series
- Color LaserJet 4500 series
- Color LaserJet 4550 series
- Color LaserJet 4600 series
- Color LaserJet 4650 series
- Color LaserJet 4700n
- Color LaserJet 4700dn
- Color LaserJet 5
- Color LaserJet 5M
- Color LaserJet 5500 series
- Color LaserJet 5550n
- Color LaserJet CM1015 MFP
- Color LaserJet CM1017 MFP
- Color LaserJet CM1312nfi MFP
- Color LaserJet CP1215
- Color LaserJet CP1518ni
- Color LaserJet CP3505n
- Color LaserJet CP3505x
- Color LaserJet CP3505dn
- Color LaserJet CP4005n
- Color LaserJet CP4005dn
- Color LaserJet CP6015dn

=== Inkjet all-in-one printers ===
(As of November 2014)

Office inkjet all-in-one printers
- Deskjet Ink Advantage 2640 All-in-One Printer
- Deskjet Ink Advantage 4620 e-All-in-One Printer
- Deskjet Ink Advantage 4640 e-Allin-One Printer
- Officejet 2620 All-in-One Printer
- Officejet 4600 e-All-in-One Printer
- Officejet 4620 e-All-in-One Printer
- Officejet 5700 e-All-in-One Printer
- Officejet 7610 Wide Format e-All-in-One Printer
- Officejet Pro 276dw Multifunction Printer
- Officejet Pro 6830 e-All-in-One Printer
- Officejet Pro 8610/8620/8630 e-All-in-One Printer Series

Photo and document all-in-one printers

- Deskjet 1050A All-in-One Printer Series – J4
- Deskjet 1510 All-in-One Printer
- Deskjet 2510 All-in-One Printer
- Deskjet 2540 All-in-One Printer
- Deskjet 3520 e-All-in-One Printer
- Deskjet Ink Advantage 1510 All-in-One Printer
- Deskjet Ink Advantage 2540 All-in-One Printer
- Deskjet Ink Advantage 3500 e-All-in-One Printer
- Deskjet Ink Advantage 3540 e-All-in-One Printer series
- Deskjet Ink Advantage 6520 e-All-in-One Printer
- ENVY 120 e-All-in-One Printer
- ENVY 4500 e-All-in-One Printer
- ENVY 5500 e-All-in-One Printer
- ENVY 5600 e-All-in-One Printer
- ENVY 6055 e-All-in-One Printer
- ENVY 7600 e-All-in-One Printer

=== Specialty photo inkjet printers ===
(As of November 2014)

Compact photo printers

- Photosmart A310 Printer
- Photosmart A430 Portable Photo Studio Series

=== Business ink printers ===
Current line (November 2014):

Business ink multifunction printers

- Officejet Enterprise Color X585 Multifunction Printer
- Officejet Pro X476/X576 Multifunction Printer

Page wide array printers

- Officejet Enterprise Color X555 Printer
- Officejet Pro X451 Printer
- Officejet Pro X551 Printer

=== Color inkjet printers ===
Current line (November 2014):

Document and photo printers
- Deskjet 1010 Printer
- Deskjet Ink Advantage 1010 Printer

Office color inkjet printers

- Officejet 6100 ePrinter series – H6
- Officejet 7110 Wide Format ePrinter series – H8
- Officejet Pro 251dw Printer series
- Officejet Pro 8100 ePrinter series – N8

Discontinued models

- Deskjet
- DeskJet (original)
- DeskJet Plus
- DeskJet Portable
- Deskjet 200cci
- DeskJet 300j
- Deskjet 310 / 310 with Sheetfeeder
- Deskjet 320 / 320 with Sheetfeeder
- Deskjet 340 / 340cbi / 340 cm / 340cv
- Deskjet 350c / 350cbi
- Deskjet 400 / 400L
- Deskjet 420 / 420c
- Deskjet 450cbi / 450vci / 450wbt
- Deskjet 460c
- Deskjet 460cb
- Deskjet 460wf
- Deskjet 460wbt
- Deskjet 500 / 500c / 500k
- Deskjet 505d / 505k
- Deskjet 510
- Deskjet 520
- DeskJet 525q
- Deskjet 540
- Deskjet 550c
- Deskjet 560c / 560j / 560k
- Deskjet 600 / 600c / 600k
- Deskjet 610c / 610cl
- Deskjet 612c
- Deskjet 630c
- Deskjet 632c
- Deskjet 640c / 640u
- Deskjet 642c
- Deskjet 648c
- Deskjet 656c / 656cvr
- Deskjet 660c / 660cse / 660k
- Deskjet 670c / 670k / 670tv
- Deskjet 672c
- Deskjet 680c
- Deskjet 682c
- Deskjet 690c
- Deskjet 692c / 692k
- Deskjet 693c
- Deskjet 694c
- Deskjet 695c / 695cci
- Deskjet 697c
- Deskjet 710c
- Deskjet 712c
- Deskjet 720c
- Deskjet 722c
- Deskjet 810c
- Deskjet 812c
- Deskjet 815c
- Deskjet 820cse / 820cxi
- Deskjet 825c / 825cvr
- Deskjet 830c
- Deskjet 832c
- Deskjet 840c
- Deskjet 841c
- Deskjet 842c
- Deskjet 843c / 843cxe
- Deskjet 845c / 845cv / 845cvr
- Deskjet 850c / 850k
- Deskjet 855c / 855cse / 855cxi
- Deskjet 870cse / 870cxi / 870k
- Deskjet 880c
- Deskjet 882c
- Deskjet 890c / 890cse
- Deskjet 895cse / 895cxi
- Deskjet 916c
- Deskjet 920c / 920cvr / 920cxi
- Deskjet 930c / 930 cm
- Deskjet 932c
- Deskjet 934c
- Deskjet 935c
- Deskjet 940c / 940cvr / 940cw / 940cxi
- Deskjet 948c
- Deskjet 950c
- Deskjet 952c
- Deskjet 955c
- Deskjet 957c
- Deskjet 959c
- Deskjet 960c / 960cse / 960cxi
- Deskjet 970cse / 970cxi
- Deskjet 980cxi
- Deskjet 990 cm / 990cse/ 990cxi
- Deskjet 995c / 995ck
- Deskjet 1000 / 1000cse / 1000cxi
- Deskjet 1100c
- Deskjet 1120c / 1120cse / 1120cxi
- Deskjet 1125c
- Deskjet 1180c
- Deskjet 1200c / 1200c/PS
- Deskjet 1220c / 1220c/PS / 1220cse / 1220cxi
- Deskjet 1280
- Deskjet 1600c / 1600 cm / 1600cn
- Deskjet 3000 Printer
- Deskjet 3050A Printer All-in-One
- Deskjet 3320 / 3322 / 3323 3325
- Deskjet 3420 / 3425 / 3450
- Deskjet 3520 / 3535 / 3550
- Deskjet 3620 / 3645 / 3648 / 3650 / 3653
- Deskjet 3740 / 3743 / 3744 / 3745 / 3747 / 3748
- Deskjet 3810 / 3816 / 3820 / 3822 / 3843 / 3845 / 3847 / 3848
- Deskjet 3910 / 3915 / 3918 / 3920 / 3930 / 3938 / 3940
- Deskjet 5145 / 5150 / 5155 / 5160
- Deskjet 5420v / 5440 / 5442 / 5443
- Deskjet 5550 / 5551 / 5552
- Deskjet 5650 / 5650w / 5652 / 5655
- Deskjet 5740 / 5743 / 5745 / 5748
- Deskjet 5850
- Deskjet 5940 / 5943
- Deskjet 6122 / 6127
- Deskjet 6520 / 6540 / 6543 / 6548
- Deskjet 6620
- Deskjet 6830v /6840 / 6843 / 6848
- Deskjet 6940 / 6980
- Deskjet 6988
- Deskjet 6988dt
- Deskjet 9300
- Deskjet 9650 / 9670 / 9680
- Deskjet 9800 / 9800d
- Deskjet D1455
- Deskjet D1520
- Deskjet D1560
- Deskjet D1660
- Deskjet D2400
- Deskjet D2430
- Deskjet D2460
- Deskjet D2530
- Deskjet D2545
- Deskjet D2560
- Deskjet D2660
- Deskjet D3650
- Deskjet D4160
- Deskjet D4260
- DeskJet F380 All-in-One
- DeskJet F4100 series All-in-One
- Deskjet All-in-one F4185
- DeskJet F4200 series All-in-One
- DeskJet F4500 series All-in-One
- HP SureSupply
- Officejet
- Officejet (original)
- Officejet 300
- Officejet 330
- Officejet 350
- Officejet 500 series
- Officejet 600
- Officejet 610
- Officejet 630
- Officejet 635
- Officejet 700
- Officejet 710
- Officejet 720
- Officejet 725
- Officejet 600 series
- Officejet 700 series
- Officejet 4110
- Officejet 4215
- Officejet 4315
- Officejet 4500
- Officejet 5110
- Officejet 5510
- Officejet 5610
- Officejet 6110
- Officejet 6210
- Officejet 6310
- Officejet 6500A
- Officejet 6600 e-All-in-One Printer series-H711
- Officejet 6700
- Officejet 7110
- Officejet 7115
- Officejet 7130
- Officejet 7135
- Officejet 7140
- Officejet 7210
- Officejet 7310
- Officejet 7410
- Officejet 9110
- Officejet 9120
- Officejet 9130
- Officejet d125xi
- Officejet d135 / d135xi
- Officejet d145
- Officejet d155xi
- Officejet g55 / g55xi
- Officejet g85 / g85xi
- Officejet g95
- Officejet J5700 series
- Officejet k60 / k60xi
- Officejet k80 / k80xi
- Officejet L7500 series
- Officejet L7600 series
- Officejet L7700 series
- Officejet r40 / r40xi
- Officejet r45
- Officejet r60
- Officejet r65
- Officejet r80 / r80xi
- Officejet t45 / t45xi
- Officejet t65 / t65xi
- Officejet t85
- Officejet v30
- Officejet v40 / v40xi
- Officejet v45
- Officejet Pro 1150c / 1150cse
- Officejet Pro 1170c / 1170cse / 1170cxi
- Officejet Pro 1175c / 1175cse / 1175cxi
- Officejet Pro 8500
- Officejet Pro 8500 wireless
- Officejet Pro 8500 premier
- Officejet Pro 8600
- Officejet Pro 8600 Plus
- Officejet Pro 8600 Premium
- PSC
- PSC 300
- PSC 500 / 500xi
- PSC 720
- PSC 750 / 750xi
- PSC 760
- PSC 950 / 950xi
- PSC 1110
- PSC 1210
- PSC 1213
- PSC 1215
- PSC 1310
- PSC 1315
- PSC 1350
- PSC 1410
- PSC 1510
- PSC 1610
- PSC 2110 / 2110v / 2110xi
- PSC 2175
- PSC 2210 / 2210v / 2210xi
- PSC 2355
- PSC 2410 Photosmart
- PSC 2510 Photosmart
- Photosmart
- Photosmart (original)
- Photosmart 100
- Photosmart 130
- Photosmart 145
- Photosmart 230
- Photosmart 245
- Photosmart 325
- Photosmart 335
- Photosmart 375
- Photosmart 385
- Photosmart 475
- Photosmart 1000 / p1000
- Photosmart 1115
- Photosmart 1215
- Photosmart 1218
- Photosmart 1315
- Photosmart 2575
- Photosmart 2610
- Photosmart 2710
- Photosmart 3110
- Photosmart 3210
- Photosmart 3310
- Photosmart 5510 e-All-in-One Printer
- Photosmart 5514 e-All-in-One Printer
- Photosmart 5520 e-All-in-One Printer
- Photosmart 6510 e-All-in-One Printer
- Photosmart 6520 e-All-in-One Printer
- Photosmart 7150
- Photosmart 7260 (Introduced August 2007)
- Photosmart 7350
- Photosmart 7355
- Photosmart 7450
- Photosmart 7460
- Photosmart 7510 e-All-in-One Printer
- Photosmart 7520 e-All-in-One Printer
- Photosmart 7525 e-All-in-One Printer
- Photosmart 7550
- Photosmart 7660
- Photosmart 7760
- Photosmart 7960
- Photosmart 8049/8050
- Photosmart 8150 (Introduced in 2004)
- Photosmart 8450
- Photosmart 8750
- Photosmart A310
- Photosmart A510 series
- Photosmart A610 series
- Photosmart A710
- Photosmart C3180
- Photosmart C4180
- Photosmart C4280
- Photosmart C4380
- Photosmart C4480
- Photosmart C4580
- Photosmart C4680
- Photosmart C4780
- Photosmart C4795
- Photosmart C5180
- Photosmart C5280
- Photosmart C5380
- Photosmart C6180 All-in-One Printer
- Photosmart C6280
- Photosmart C7180
- Photosmart C7280
- Photosmart C7288
- Photosmart C8180
- Photosmart D7560
- Photosmart eStation e-All-in-One Printer – C510a
- Photo Kiosk that prints 4x6 prints in seconds
- Photo Kiosk that creates greeting cardsposters and calendars
- Photosmart p1000
- Photosmart p1100 / p1100xi
- Photosmart Plus e-All-in-One Printer – B210a
- Photosmart Premium e-All-in-One Printer – C310a
- Photosmart Premium Fax e-All-in-One Printer – C410a
- Photosmart Wireless e-All-in-One Printer – B110a

=== Designjet printers ===
Current line (November 2014):

Office printers for CAD and GIS
- Designjet T120
- Designjet T520
- Designjet T790ps
- Designjet T795
- Designjet T920
- Designjet T920ps
- Designjet T1300ps
- Designjet T1500
- Designjet T1500ps
- Designjet T1700
- Designjet T2500 eMFP

Graphics printers

- Designjet Z2100
- Designjet Z3200
- Designjet Z3200ps
- Designjet Z5200ps
- Designjet Z5400ps
- Designjet Z6200
- Designjet Z6600
- Designjet Z6800
- Designjet Z6
- Designjet Z9+

Scanners

- Designjet HD Pro Scanner
- Designjet HD Scanner
- Designjet SD Pro Scanner

Production printers

- Designjet T3500 eMFP
- Designjet T7200
- Designjet Z6600
- Designjet Z6800

Discontinued models

- Designjet 10ps
- Designjet 20ps
- Designjet 30
- Designjet 50ps
- Designjet 70
- Designjet 90
- Designjet 90gp
- Designjet 90r
- Designjet 100
- Designjet 100plus
- Designjet 110plus
- Designjet 110plus nr
- Designjet 111
- Designjet 120
- Designjet 130
- Designjet 130gp
- Designjet 130nr
- Designjet 200
- Designjet 250C
- Designjet 330
- Designjet 350C
- Designjet 430
- Designjet 450C
- Designjet 455c
- Designjet 500
- Designjet 510
- Designjet 600
- Designjet 650C
- Designjet 750
- Designjet 750c
- Designjet 755CM
- Designjet 800
- Designjet 800ps
- Designjet 815mfp
- Designjet 820 MFP
- Designjet 1050C
- Designjet 1055CM
- Designjet 1050c Plus
- Designjet 1055 cm Plus
- Designjet 2000CP
- Designjet 2500CP
- Designjet 2800CP
- Designjet 3000CP
- Designjet 3500CP
- Designjet 3800CP
- Designjet 4000
- Designjet 4000PS
- Designjet 4200 Scanner
- Designjet 4500
- Designjet 4500ps
- Designjet 4500mfp
- Designjet 4500 Scanner
- Designjet 5000
- Designjet 5100 (Asia Pacific Only)
- Designjet 5000ps
- Designjet 5500
- Designjet 5500ps
- Designjet 8000sr
- Designjet 9000s
- Designjet 9000sf
- Designjet 10000s
- Designjet L25500
- Designjet L65500
- Designjet T610
- Designjet T790
- Designjet T1100
- Designjet T1100ps
- Designjet T1100mfp
- Designjet T1200
- Designjet T1300
- Designjet T2300 eMFP
- Designjet T7100
- Designjet Z3100
- Designjet Z3100ps
- Designjet Z3100ps GP
- Designjet Z6100
- Designjet Z6100ps

=== HP Indigo Digital Presses ===
Current line (November 2014):

Commercial digital presses
- Indigo 5000 Digital Press series
- Indigo 6800 Digital Press
- Indigo 7500 Digital Press
- Indigo 7600 Digital Press
- Indigo W7250 Digital Press

Industrial digital presses

- Indigo 10000 Digital Press
- Indigo 20000 Digital Press
- Indigo 30000 Digital Press
- Indigo W7250 Digital Press

=== HP Inkjet Digital Web Press ===
Current line (November 2014):

Inkjet digital web presses

- T300 Inkjet Web Press series

=== HP latex printers ===
Current line (June 2015):

Low-volume latex printers
- HP Latex 280 Printer
- HP Latex 310 Printer
- HP Latex 330 Printer
- HP Latex 360 Printer
- HP Latex 370 Printer

Mid to high-volume latex printers

- HP Latex 3000 Printer
- HP Latex 3200 Printer
- HP Latex 3600 Printer
- HP Latex 820 Printer
- HP Latex 850 Printer

=== HP Scitex large format printers ===
Current line (June 2015):

Industrial presses
- Scitex 15000 Corrugated Press
- Scitex FB10000 Industrial Press series
- Scitex FB7600 Industrial Press
- Scitex TURBOjet Industrial Press series

Industrial printers

- Scitex FB550 Industrial Printer
- Scitex FB750 Industrial Printer
- Scitex XP2500 Industrial Printer
- Scitex XP2750 Industrial Printer
- Scitex XP5100 Industrial Printer
- Scitex XP5500 Industrial Printer

=== Network print servers ===
Current line (November 2014):

External print servers
- 1200w NFC/Wireless Mobile Print Accessory
- Jetdirect 2800w NFC/Wireless Direct Accessory
- Jetdirect 300x Print Server series

Internal print servers

- Jetdirect 620n Print Server series
- Jetdirect 640n Print Server series

Wireless print servers

- Jetdirect 2700w USB Wireless Print Server
- Jetdirect 695nw Print Server series
- Wi-Fi/Fast Ethernet Combination Print Servers

Printer notes: In HP printers introduced since ca 2006, alpha codes indicate product groupings and optional features, thus, for example:

* Lead alpha codes:
  - A – HP Photosmart Axxx Compact/Portable photo printer
  - B – HP Photosmart Pro Bxxxx photo printer
  - C – HP Photosmart Cxxxx All-in-One photo printer
  - CM – HP Color LaserJet CMxxxx Multifunction printer
  - CP – HP Color LaserJet CPxxxx printer
  - D – HP Deskjet Dxxxx printer
  - D – HP Photosmart Dxxxx Single Function photo printer
  - F – HP Deskjet Fxxx All-in-One printer
  - G – HP Scanjet Gxxxx photo/flatbed scanner
  - K – HP Officejet Pro Kxxx color printer
  - M – HP Mono LaserJet Mxxxx Multifunction printer
  - N – HP Scanjet Nxxxx document/professional image scanner
  - P – HP Mono LaserJet Pxxxx printer
* Trailing alpha description codes:
  - aio – All in one
  - d – Duplex
  - eMFP – Electronic multi function printer
  - h – Hard disk
  - l – Light use
  - mfp – Multi function printer
  - n – Network
  - s – Stacker
  - sk – Stapler & stacker
  - t – Extra tray
  - tn – Tray and networking
  - x – Duplex, extra tray, and network (formerly dtn)
  - xs – Duplex, extra tray, network and stacker
  - xsk – Duplex, extra tray, network and stapler / stacker

== HP software products ==
- HP Cloud Services Print App series
- HP Connected Music
- HP Connected Photo
- HP Instant Ink series
- HP Link Reader
- HP Live Photo
- HP Photo Creations Software
- HP Scan and Capture Application
- HP Smart Web Printing Software
- HP SureSupply Software
- HP Touch point Manager
- HP Update Software
- HP WallArt Solution

== HP converged cloud products ==
- HP Public Cloud
- HP CloudSystem

== Digital cameras ==
=== Original line ===
- Photosmart 318
- Photosmart 320
- Photosmart 433
- Photosmart 435
- Photosmart 620
- Photosmart 635
- Photosmart 720
- Photosmart 735
- Photosmart 812
- Photosmart 850
- Photosmart 935
- Photosmart 945

=== HP E-series ===
- Photosmart E317
- Photosmart E327
- Photosmart E427
- Photosmart E337

=== HP M-series ===
- Photosmart M22
- Photosmart M247
- Photosmart M23
- Photosmart M305
- Photosmart M307
- Photosmart M407
- Photosmart M415
- Photosmart M417
- Photosmart M425
- Photosmart M447
- Photosmart M517
- Photosmart M537
- Photosmart M540
- Photosmart M627
- Photosmart M637
- Photosmart M737
- Photosmart Mz67

=== HP R-series ===
- Photosmart R507
- Photosmart R607
- Photosmart R607 BMW Special series
- Photosmart R707
- Photosmart R717
- Photosmart R817
- Photosmart R725
- Photosmart R727
- Photosmart R827
- Photosmart R927
- Photosmart R967
- Photosmart R742
- Photosmart R837
- Photosmart R847
- Photosmart R927
- Photosmart R937

== Scanners ==
=== ScanJet series ===
- ScanJet
- ScanJet Plus
- ScanJet IIc
- ScanJet IIcx
- ScanJet IIp
- ScanJet 200
- ScanJet 2200c
- ScanJet 2400
- ScanJet 3c
- ScanJet 3p
- ScanJet 3300c
- ScanJet 3500c
- ScanJet 3670
- ScanJet 3770
- ScanJet 3970
- ScanJet 4c
- ScanJet 4p
- ScanJet 4s
- ScanJet 4si
- ScanJet G2410
- ScanJet G3110
- ScanJet G4010
- ScanJet G4050
- ScanJet N6310
- ScanJet N6350
- ScanJet 4070
- ScanJet 4100c
- ScanJet 4370
- ScanJet 4400c
- ScanJet 4570c
- ScanJet 5c
- ScanJet 5p
- ScanJet 5100c
- ScanJet 5200c
- ScanJet 5300c
- ScanJet 5370c
- ScanJet 5470c
- ScanJet 5530
- ScanJet 5550c
- ScanJet 5590
- ScanJet 5670
- ScanJet 6100c
- ScanJet 6200c
- ScanJet 6250c
- ScanJet 6300c
- ScanJet 7400c
- ScanJet 7650
- ScanJet 8200
- ScanJet 8250
- ScanJet 8270
- ScanJet 8290
- ScanJet 8350
- ScanJet N8460
- ScanJet Enterprise Flow 5000 s2
- ScanJet Enterprise Flow 7000 s2
- ScanJet Pro 1000 Mobile
- ScanJet Pro 2000 s1
- ScanJet Pro 3000 s3
- ScanJet Enterprise Flow 5000 s4
- ScanJet Enterprise Flow 7000 s3
- Network ScanJet 5

=== Film scanners ===
- HP Photosmart
- HP S20
- HP S20xi

== Tablet computers ==
- HP 7 1800
- HP Slate
  - Slate 6
  - Slate 7
  - Slate 8 Plus
  - Slate 10 Plus
- HP TouchPad
- HP Omni 10
- HP Stream 7
- HP Stream 8
- HP Envy 8 Note
- HP 408
- HP 608
- HP 612
- HP ElitePad

== Mobile phones ==
- Palm Prē, Prē Plus, Prē 2, Prē 3
- HP Veer
- Palm Pixi, Pixi Plus
- HP Elite x3

== Pocket computers ==
- HP-75 BASIC hand-held 1982

=== LX series ===
- HP 95LX (Palmtop PC, V20, MS-DOS 3.22)
- HP 100LX (Palmtop PC, 186, MS-DOS 5.0)
- HP Palmtop FX (Palmtop PC, x86, MS-DOS 5.0)
- HP 200LX (Palmtop PC, 186, MS-DOS 5.0)
- HP 1000CX (Palmtop PC, 186, MS-DOS 5.0)
- HP 300LX (Handheld PC, SH3, Windows CE 1.0)
- HP 320LX (Handheld PC, SH3, Windows CE 1.0)
- HP 340LX (Handheld PC, SH3, Windows CE 2.0)
- HP 360LX (Handheld PC, SH3, Windows CE 2.0)
- HP 620LX (Handheld PC, SH3, Windows CE 2.0/2.11)
- HP 660LX (Handheld PC, SH3, Windows CE 2.0/2.11)
- HP 700LX (Palmtop PC, 186, MS-DOS 5.0)

=== OmniGo series ===
- HP OmniGo 100
- HP OmniGo 120
- HP OmniGo 700LX

=== Jornada ===
- HP Jornada 420 Palm-size PC (Pocket PC)
- HP Jornada 520 Palm-size PC
- HP Jornada 560
- HP Jornada 680 Palm-size PC
- HP Jornada 720 Palm-size PC
- HP Jornada 820 Palm-size PC
- HP Jornada 928.

=== iPAQ ===
Originally made by Compaq, which was acquired by HP in 2002 following the merge.

- iPAQ hw6900 (Cellphone) (Pocket PC)
- iPAQ hw6500 (Cellphone)
- iPAQ rx1950
- iPAQ rx5700 series
- iPAQ hx2100/hx2400/hx2700 series
- iPAQ hx4700
- iPAQ h6300 (Cellphone)
- iPAQ rx3000
- iPAQ rz1700
- iPAQ H5500
- iPAQ H5400
- iPAQ H5100
- iPAQ H4000
- PAQ HW6510
- iPAQ HW6515
- iPAQ HW6910
- iPAQ HW6915
- iPAQ RW6800
- Compaq iPAQ H3900
- Compaq iPAQ H3800
- Compaq iPAQ H3600
- Compaq iPAQ H3100
- iPAQ H2200
- iPAQ H1900

Source: HP Handheld/Pocket/Palmtop PCs

== Desktop calculators and computers ==
HP 9800 series desktop computers as follows:

- HP 9100 Keystroke
- HP 9810 Keystroke
- HP 9820 HPL
- HP 9830 BASIC
- HP 9815 Keystroke
- HP 9825 HPL
- HP 9845/HP 9835 BASIC
  - HP 9845C BASIC color
- HP 85 BASIC small desktop
- HP 97 (A 224 steps magnetic card programmable printing calculator with a 2" scroll print-out)

=== Computer terminals ===
- HP 2640 CRT block mode
- HP 2645 CRT tape storage
- HP 2647 BASIC Graphics
- HP 2648 Graphics
- HP 2700 Color Graphics

=== Plotters ===
- HP 7470 2 pen
- HP 7475 6 pen

=== Pocket calculators ===
- Engineering calculators:
  - HP-35 (world's first science/engineering pocket calculator, 1972)
  - HP-65 (world's first programmable pocket calculator, 1974)
  - HP-34C (world's first calculator capable of root finding and integration, 1979)
  - HP-45
  - HP-55
  - HP-21
  - HP-23
  - HP-25
  - HP-32E (1978–1983)
  - HP-10C
  - HP-11C
  - HP-15C
  - HP-16C (programmer's calculator)
  - HP-27
  - HP-27S
  - HP-29C
  - HP-41C (HP's first calculator with LCD, 1979)
  - HP-20S
  - HP-22S (1988–1991)
  - HP-32S
  - HP-42S
  - HP-33E
  - HP-33C
  - HP 33s
  - HP 35s (2007)
- Financial calculators:
  - HP-12C
  - HP-17B
  - HP 20b
  - HP-22
  - HP 30b
- Graphing calculators:
  - HP-28S
  - HP 48S / HP 48SX
  - HP 48G / HP 48GX / HP 48G+
  - HP 49G
  - hp 49g+
  - hp 48gII
  - HP 50g (2006)
  - HP Prime (2013)
  - HP 38G
  - HP 39G
  - HP 40G
  - HP 39g+
  - HP 39gs
  - HP 40gs
  - HP 39gII
  - HP 9g
  - HP Xpander (SH3, Windows CE 3.0)
- Calculator wristwatches:
  - HP-01

== Business desktops ==
=== Compaq Evo ===
The Compaq Evo line of business desktops and laptops were originally made by Compaq in 2001 and was rebranded HP Compaq after the 2002 merger (see HP Business Desktops for recent products).

=== HP X-Terminal ===
See HP X-Terminals

=== HP TouchSmart PC ===
- TouchSmart 300
- TouchSmart 320
- TouchSmart 420
- TouchSmart IQ504
- TouchSmart 520
- TouchSmart 600
- TouchSmart 610
- TouchSmart 620
- TouchSmart Elite 7320
- TouchSmart IQ770
- TouchSmart IQ816
- TouchSmart 9100
- TouchSmart Elite 9300

=== HP e-PC (e-Vectra) ===
- HP e-PC 40
- HP e-PC 42
- HP e-PC c10/s10

=== HP Compaq desktops ===
See HP Business Desktops

=== HP Pro/ProDesk ===
- HP Pro 330 Microtower
- HP Pro 330 Small Form Factor

== Thin clients ==
=== Blade System ===
- HP BladeSystem bc2000 Blade PC
- HP BladeSystem bc2200 Blade PC
- HP BladeSystem bc2500 Blade PC
- HP BladeSystem bc2800 Blade PC

=== Thin client ===
See also HP Mobile Thin Clients

- HP Compaq t5135 Thin Client
- HP Compaq t5710 Thin Client
- HP Compaq t5720 Thin Client
- HP Compaq t5730 Thin Client
- HP t5335z Thin Client
- HP t5545 Thin Client
- HP t5550 Thin Client
- HP t5565z Thin Client
- HP t5630 Thin Client
- HP t5630w Thin Client
- HP t5730w Thin Client
- HP t5730wi Internet Appliance
- HP gt7720 Thin Client

== Personal desktops ==
=== Compaq Presario desktops ===
A series of desktop computers made by Compaq under the Compaq Presario brand since 1993. Acquired by HP in 2002, discontinued in 2013.

=== HP Pavilion ===
A series of desktop computers since 1995. New models sold until late 2025, succeeded by HP OmniDesk.

- HP Pavilion a1200e
- HP Pavilion a1200y
- HP Pavilion a1320y
- HP Pavilion a1330e
- HP Pavilion a1350y
- HP Pavilion a1400 series – a1400e, a1400y, a1410e, a1410y
- HP Pavilion a1500 series
- HP Pavilion a1600 series – a1620e, a1620y, a1650e, a1650y
- HP Pavilion a4000 series
- HP Pavilion a6000 series
- HP Pavilion d4000 series
- HP Pavilion p6000 series

==== HP Slimline PC ====
- HP Pavilion Slimline PC – s7300 series: s7310n, s7320n
- HP Pavilion Slimline PC – s7400 series: s7400n, s7420n
- HP Pavilion Slimline PC – s7500 series: s7510n, s7520n
- HP Pavilion Slimline PC – s7600 series: s7605n, s7610fr, s7610es, s7610it, s7610pt, s7610uk, s7620n, s7630nl

==== HP Pavilion Media Center TV ====
- HP Pavilion Media Center TV m7300e PC
- HP Pavilion Media Center TV m7300y PC
- HP Pavilion Media Center TV m7360y PC
- HP Pavilion Media Center TV m7350n PC
- HP Pavilion Media Center TV m7360n PC
- HP Pavilion Media Center TV m7470n PC
- HP Pavilion Media Center TV m7480n PC
- HP Pavilion Media Center TV m7490n PC
- HP Pavilion Media Center TV m7500 PC series – m7560n
- HP Pavilion Media Center TV m7600 PC series – m7645.uk, m7690e, m7690y
- HP Pavilion Media Center TV m8070a pc

==== HP Pavilion Elite ====
- HP Pavilion Elite m9000 series - m9040n

=== HP Blackbird 002 ===
- HP Blackbird 002

== HP Black wired keyboards ==
- HP 434820-167 PS2 Keyboard

== Business notebooks ==
=== HP OmniBook ===
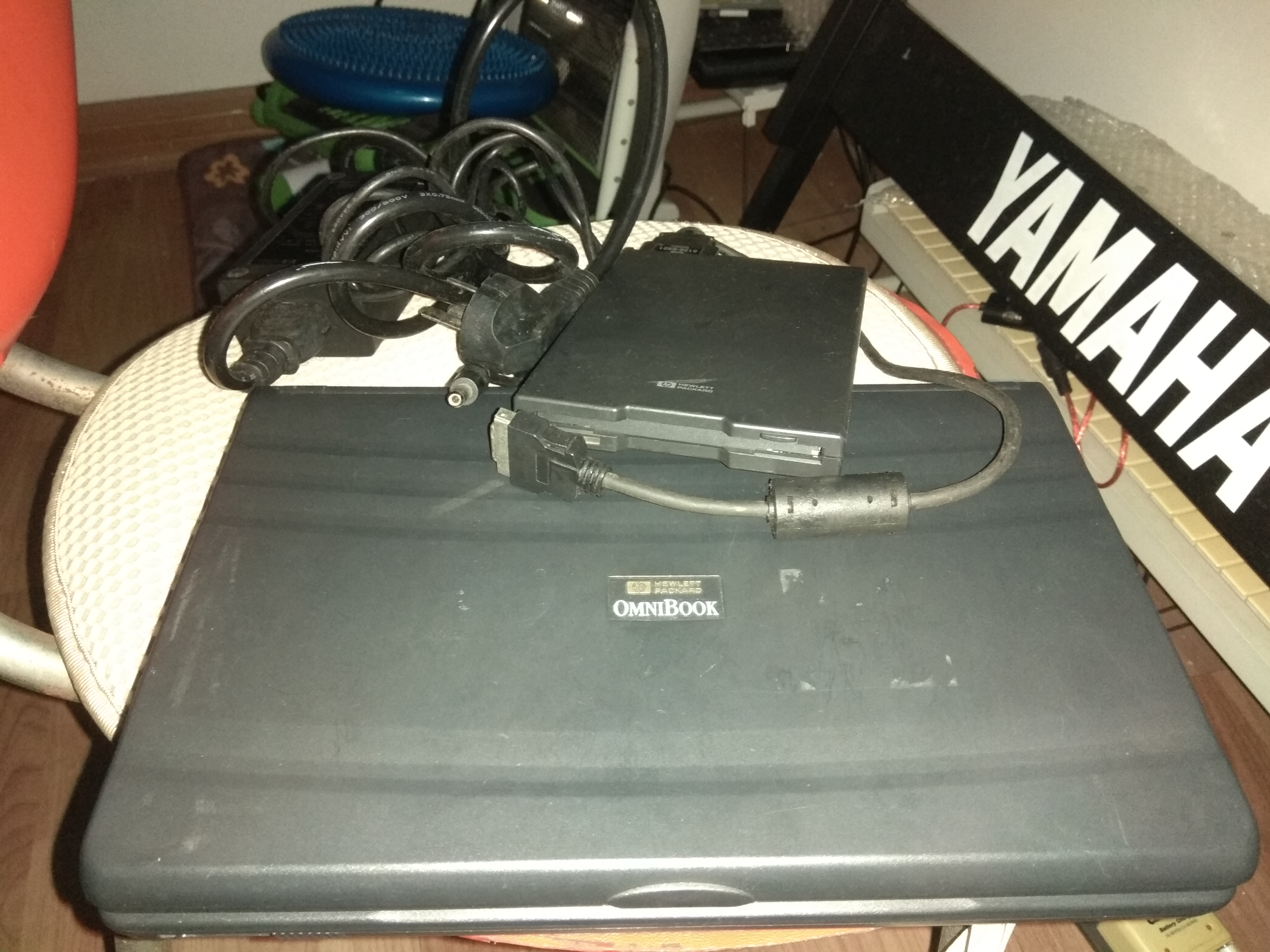
Omnibook 800CT with floppy drive

HP's line of business-oriented notebook computers since 1993. In chronological order of release:

- OmniBook 300
- OmniBook 425
- OmniBook 525, 530
- OmniBook 600C – 1st OmniBook offering a color display (DSTN)
- OmniBook 600CT – 1st OmniBook offering a TFT display
- OmniBook 4000
- OmniBook 800CS, 800CT
- OmniBook 2000
- OmniBook 3000
- OmniBook 5500
- OmniBook 5700CT
- OmniBook 2100
- OmniBook XE
- OmniBook Sojourn
- OmniBook 900, 900B
- OmniBook 4100, 4150, 4150B
- OmniBook 7100, 7150
- OmniBook XE2
- OmniBook XE3
- OmniBook 6000, 6100
- OmniBook 500
- OmniBook vt6200

Following HP's acquisition of Compaq in 2002, this series of notebooks was discontinued, replaced with the HP Pavilion, HP Compaq, and Compaq Presario notebooks.

The OmniBook name would later be repurposed for a line of consumer-oriented notebooks made by HP Inc. (Hewlett-Packard's successor) in 2024, intended to supersede HP's line of personal notebooks.

=== Compaq Evo ===
The Compaq Evo line of business desktops and laptops were originally made by Compaq and was rebranded HP Compaq after the 2002 merger (see below for recent products).

=== HP Compaq laptops ===
Timeline of HP business notebook with pointing stick from 2003 to 2007
model		2003	2004	2005	2006	2007
ultraportable	12"	nc4000	nc4010	nc4200	nc2400 (no touch pad)	2510p
ultraportable	12"	nc4000	nc4010	nc4200	nc4400	2510p
tablet pc	12"	tc1100		tc4200	tc4400	2710p
mainstream	14"	nc6000		nc6220 nc6230	nc6400	6910p
mainstream	15"		nc8000	nc8230	nc8430	8510p
mainstream	17"					8710p
mobile workstation	15"		nw8000	nw8240	nw8440	8510w
mobile workstation	17"				nw9440	8710w

- HP Compaq 2210b
- HP Compaq 2230s
- HP Compaq 2510p
- HP Compaq 2710p (Tablet PC)
- HP Compaq 2730p (Tablet PC)
- HP Compaq 6510b
- HP Compaq 6515b
- HP Compaq 6530b
- HP Compaq 6535b
- HP Compaq 6710b
- HP Compaq 6710s
- HP Compaq 6715b
- HP Compaq 6715s
- HP Compaq 6720s
- HP Compaq 6730b
- HP Compaq 6730b
- HP Compaq 6820s
- HP Compaq 6910p
- HP Compaq 8510p
- HP Compaq 8510w
- HP Compaq 8710p
- HP Compaq 8710w
- HP Compaq nc2400
- HP Compaq nc4000
- HP Compaq nc4010
- HP Compaq nc4200
- HP Compaq nc4400
- HP Compaq nc6000
- HP Compaq nc6110
- HP Compaq nc6120
- HP Compaq nc6140
- HP Compaq nc6220
- HP Compaq nc6230
- HP Compaq nc6320
- HP Compaq nc6400
- HP Compaq nc8230
- HP Compaq nc8430
- HP Compaq nw8000 Mobile Workstation
- HP Compaq nw8240 Mobile Workstation
- HP Compaq nw8440 Mobile Workstation
- HP Compaq nw9440 Mobile Workstation
- HP Compaq nx4300
- HP Compaq nx4800
- HP Compaq nx4820
- HP Compaq nx5000
- HP Compaq nx6110
- HP Compaq nx6120
- HP Compaq nx6130
- HP Compaq nx6125
- HP Compaq nx6310
- HP Compaq nx6315
- HP Compaq nx6320
- HP Compaq nx6325
- HP Compaq nx7200
- HP Compaq nx7220
- HP Compaq nx7300
- HP Compaq nx7400
- HP Compaq nx8220
- HP Compaq nx9000
- HP Compaq nx9005
- HP Compaq nx9010
- HP Compaq nx9020
- HP Compaq nx9040
- HP Compaq nx9100
- HP Compaq nx9420
- HP Compaq tc4200 (Tablet PC)
- HP Compaq tc4400 (Tablet PC)
- HP Compaq Presario B1900
- HP Compaq 500
- HP 520 Notebook
- HP 530 Notebook
- HP Compaq 610
- HP Compaq 615

=== HP Mini ===
- HP Mini 5101
- HP Mini 2133
- HP Mini 2140

=== HP ProBook ===
- HP Probook 4221s
- HP ProBook 4310s
- HP ProBook 4510s
- HP ProBook 4515s
- HP ProBook 4520s
- HP ProBook 4530s
- HP ProBook 4540s
- HP ProBook 4710s
- HP ProBook 5310m
- HP ProBook 6460b
- HP ProBook 6540b
- HP ProBook 6560b
- HP ProBook 6570b

=== HP EliteBook ===
See the HP EliteBook article for more details.

First generation — The xx30 generation comprised the following models:

- 2530p: 12.1" ultraportable
- 2730p: 12.1" Tablet PC
- 6930p: 14.1" mainstream
- 8530p: 15.4" mainstream
- 8530w: 15.4" mobile workstation
- 8730w: 17.0" mobile workstation

Second generation — The xx40 series comprised the following models:

- 2540p: 12.1" ultraportable
- 2740p: 12.1" Tablet PC
- 8440p: 14.0" mainstream
- 8440w: 14.0" mobile workstation
- 8540p: 15.6" mainstream
- 8540w: 15.6" mobile workstation
- 8740w: 17.0" mobile workstation

Third generation — The xx60 series, announced on February 23, 2011, comprised the following models:

- 2560p: 12.5" ultraportable
- 2760p: 12.1" Tablet PC
- 8460p: 14.0" mainstream
- 8460w: 14.0" mobile workstation
- 8560p: 15.6" mainstream
- 8560w: 15.6" mobile workstation
- 8760w: 17.3" mobile workstation

Fourth generation — The fourth generation, announced on May 9, 2012, comprised the following models:

- Revolve 810: 11.6" Tablet PC
- 2170p: 11.6" ultraportable
- 2570p: 12.5" ultraportable
- 8470p: 14.0" mainstream
- 8470w: 14.0" mobile workstation
- 9470m: 14.0" ultrabook
- 8570p: 15.6" mainstream
- 8570w: 15.6" mobile workstation
- 8770w: 17.3" mobile workstation

=== Mobile thin client ===
- HP Compaq 2533t Mobile Thin Client
- HP 4410t Mobile Thin Client
- HP Compaq 6720t Mobile Thin Client

=== Rugged notebooks ===
- nr3600
- nr3610
- tr3000 (Microsoft Tablet PC)

== Personal notebooks ==
=== Compaq Presario laptops ===
A series of notebook computers made by Compaq under the Compaq Presario brand since 1996. Acquired by HP in 2002 and replaces HP OmniBook that year, discontinued in 2013.

- Compaq Presario C300
- Compaq Presario C500
- Compaq Presario F500 (HP G6000)
- Compaq Presario C700T
- Compaq Presario F700 (HP G6000)
- Compaq Presario 1200
- Compaq Presario 1700
- Compaq Presario M2000
- Compaq Presario R3000
- Compaq Presario V2000 (HP Pavilion dv1000)
- Compaq Presario V3000
- Compaq Presario V4000
- Compaq Presario V5000
- Compaq Presario V6000 (HP Pavilion dv6000)

=== HP Pavilion notebooks ===
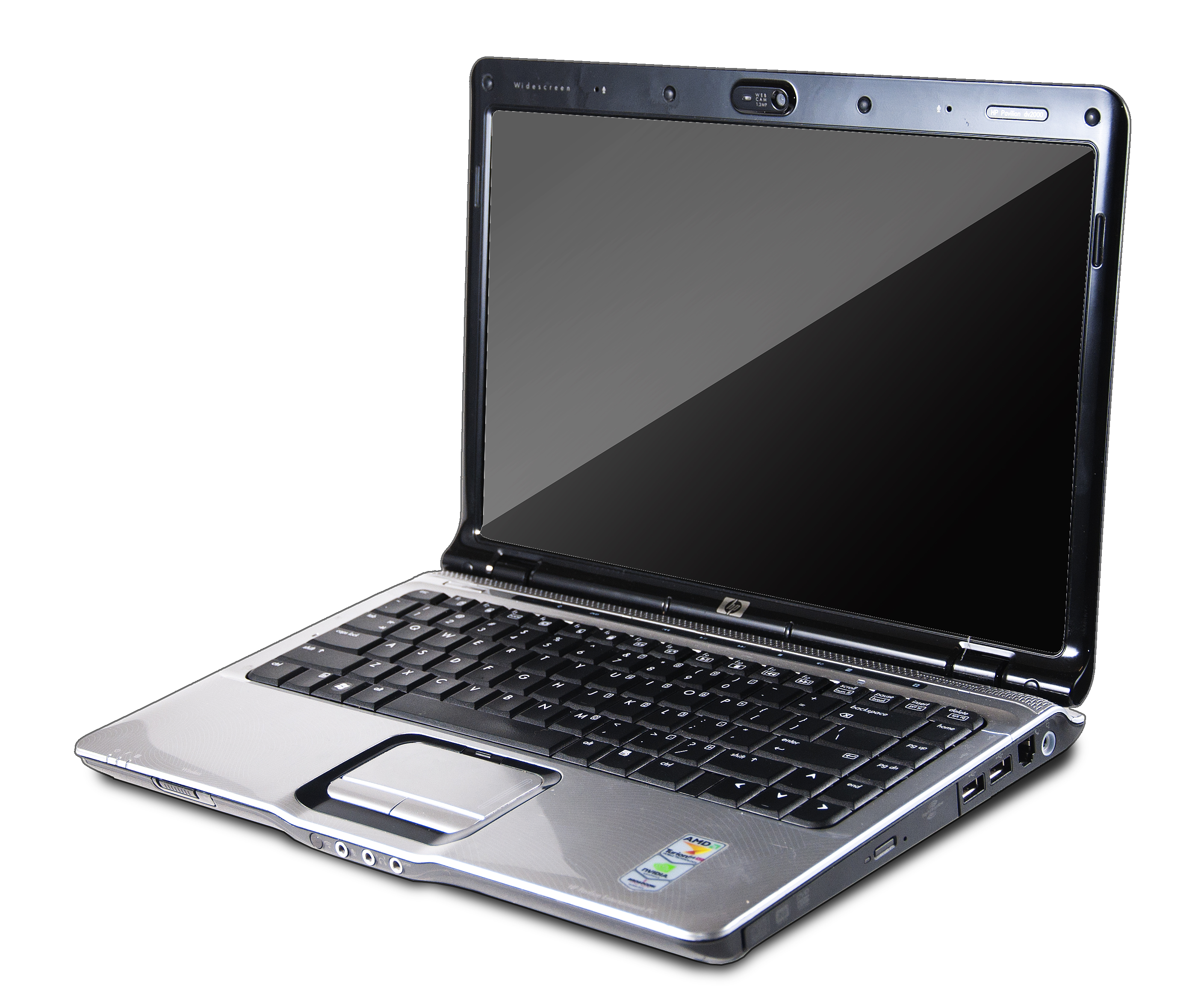
A HP DV2000 notebook

A series of notebooks and multimedia notebooks since 1999. New models sold until 2026, succeeded by the revised HP OmniBook line. Some models released from 2004–2009 had the HP developed QuickPlay software which enabled booting to a linux based DVD/Music player held on a separate partition (models with Windows Vista are unable to boot into QuickPlay due to compatibility issues).

- HP Pavilion dm1
- HP Pavilion dm3
- HP Pavilion dm4
- HP Pavilion dv2z
- HP Pavilion dv3
- HP Pavilion dv4
- HP Pavilion dv5
- HP Pavilion dv6
- HP Pavilion dv7
- HP Pavilion dv8
- HP Pavilion dv1000
- HP Pavilion dv2000
- HP Pavilion dv4000
- HP Pavilion dv5000
- HP Pavilion dv6000
- HP Pavilion dv8000
- HP Pavilion dv9000
- HP Pavilion N3110
- HP Pavilion N3150
- HP Pavilion N3190
- HP Pavilion tx1000
- HP Pavilion tx2000
- HP Pavilion tx2500
- HP Pavilion zd8000
- HP Pavilion ze2000
- HP Pavilion ze4100
- HP Pavilion ze4145
- HP Pavilion ze4430
- HP Pavilion ze4900
- HP Pavilion ze5600
- HP Pavilion zv5000
- HP Pavilion zv6000
- HP Pavilion g4
- HP Pavilion g6
- HP Pavilion g7
- HP Pavilion HDX
- HP HDX 16
- HP HDX 18

=== HP Envy ===
- HP Envy dv6
- HP Envy dv7
- HP Envy m6
- HP Envy m7
- HP Envy 15
- HP Envy 17

=== HP G series ===
- HP G3000
- HP G5000
- HP G6000
- HP G7000
- HP G60
- HP G61
- HP G62
- HP G70
- HP G42

=== HP Mini ===
- HP Mini 110 with Intel Atom
- HP Mini 210 with Intel Atom

=== HP OmniBook ===
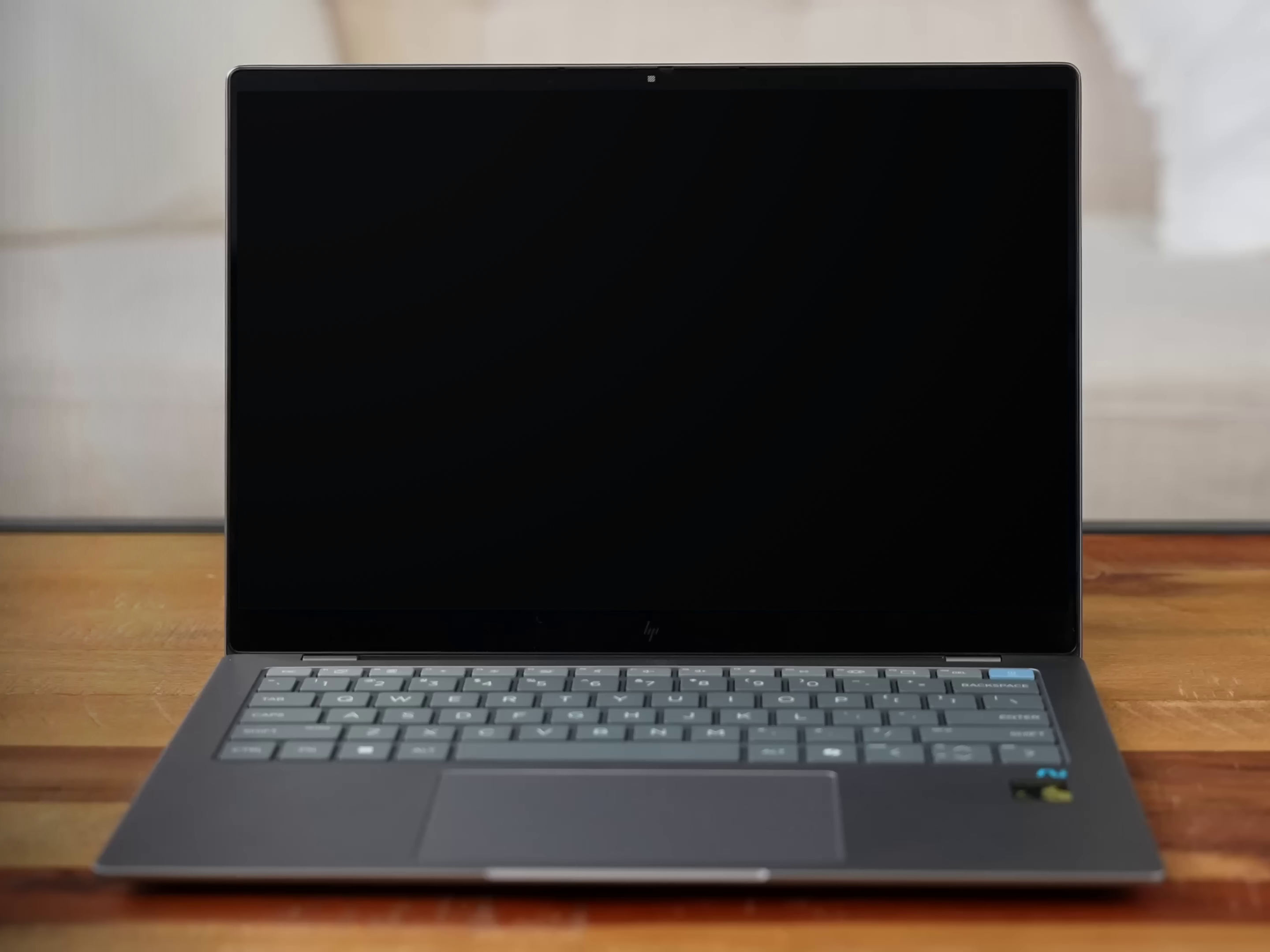
OmniBook X

A series of "Next Gen AI" notebook computers introduced by HP Inc. (Hewlett-Packard's successor) in 2024 that included built-in artificial intelligence features. The name was originally used for a line of business-oriented laptops and notebooks made by Hewlett-Packard from 1993–2002, and succeeds HP's former laptop offerings.

- OmniBook 3
- OmniBook 5
- OmniBook 7
- OmniBook X
- OmniBook Ultra

== Workstations ==
=== PA-RISC based ===
- HP workstation c8000
- HP workstation b2600
- HP workstation c3600
- HP workstation c3650
- HP workstation c3700
- HP workstation c3750
- HP workstation j6750
- HP Visualization Center sv7
- HP Visualize B180 (Single CPU)
- HP Visualize C200 (Single CPU)
- HP Visualize B1000 (Single CPU)
- HP Visualize C3000 (Single CPU)
- HP Visualize C3600 (Single CPU)
- HP Visualize J5000 (Dual CPU)
- HP Visualize J5600 (Dual CPU)
- HP Visualize J7000 (Quad CPU)
- HP Visualize J7600 (Quad CPU)

=== Itanium based ===
- HP Workstation i2000 – up to two Itanium 733 MHz or 800 MHz processors with 2MB or 4MB cache
- HP Workstation zx2000 – Itanium 2 single-core processor with clock rates between 900 MHz and 1.5 GHz
- HP Workstation zx6000 – up to two Itanium 2 single-core processors with clock rates between 900 MHz and 1.6 GHz

=== Alpha based (from DEC, via Compaq) ===
- AlphaStation ES47
- AlphaStation DS25
- AlphaStation DS15

=== x86 based ===
- HP Kayak XA – Slot 1 2x Pentium II processor and SDRAM memory
- HP Kayak XW – Slot 1 2x Pentium II processor and SDRAM memory
- HP Kayak XU800 – Slot 1 2x Pentium III processor and SDRAM memory
- HP Visualize P-Class – Slot 1 2x Pentium III processor and SDRAM memory
- HP Visualize P600 – Slot 1 2x Pentium III processor and SDRAM memory
- HP Visualize X-Class – Slot 1 2x Pentium III processor and SDRAM memory
- HP Visualize X550 – Slot 2 2x Pentium III Xeon processor and SDRAM memory
- HP x2000 – Socket 423 Pentium 4 (Willamette) processor and RDRAM memory
- HP x2100 – Socket 478 Pentium 4 processor with FSB400 and RDRAM memory
- HP x4000 – up to two Socket 603 FSB400 single-core Xeon processors and RDRAM memory
- HP xw3100
- HP xw4000
- HP xw4100
- HP xw4200
- HP xw4300
- HP xw4400 – Intel Core 2 Duo
- HP xw4550 – Dual or Quad Core Opteron
- HP xw4600 – Core 2 Duo/Quad/Extreme
- HP xw5000
- HP xw6000
- HP xw6200 – up to two Socket 604 FSB800 single-core Xeon processors
- HP xw6400 – up to two Xeon 5000 (NetBurst dual core), 5100 (dual core) or 5300 (quad core) series processors
- HP xw6600 – up to two Xeon 5200 (dual core) or 5400 (quad core) series processors
- HP xw8000 – up to two Socket 604 FSB533 single-core Xeon processors
- HP xw8200 – up to two Socket 604 FSB800 single-core Xeon processors
- HP xw8400 – up to two Xeon 5000 (NetBurst dual core), 5100 (dual core) or 5300 (quad core) series processors
- HP xw8600 – up to two Xeon 5200 (dual core) or 5400 (quad core) series processors
- HP xw9300 – up to two Socket 940 Opteron 200 series processors (single/dual core)
- HP xw9400 – up to two Socket F Opteron 2200 series (dual core), 2300 series (quad core) or 2400 series (6 core) processors
- HP Compaq nw8000 – Pentium-M powered laptop

HP Z Series - all-in-one

- HP Z1 – all-in-one workstation
- HP Z1 G2 – all-in-one workstation with Intel Core i3, i5, i7 or Xeon E3-1200 v3 processors
- HP Z1 G3 – all-in-one workstation with Intel Core i3, i5, i7 or Xeon E3-1200 v5 processors

HP Z Series - desktop

Generation 1 (2010–2012)

- HP Z200 – Intel Xeon (X34xx) or Core i3, i5
- HP Z210 – Intel Xeon (E3-12xx) or Sandy Bridge Core i3, i5, i7
- HP Z400 – Intel Xeon W3500 or W3600 series processor
- HP Z600 – up to two Xeon 5500 or 5600 series (2/4/6 core) processors
- HP Z800 – up to two Xeon v1/2 5500, v3 5600 series (2/4/6 core) processors

Z Series Generation 2 (2013 - 2015)

- HP Z2 Mini – Intel Xeon (E3 v5), Core i7, i5 or i3 processors
- HP Z220 – Intel Xeon (E3-12xx v2) or Ivy Bridge Core i5, i7
- HP Z230 – Intel Xeon (E3-12xx v3) or Haswell Core i5, i7
- HP Z420 – Intel Xeon (E5-16xx or E5-2650 v2) processors
- HP Z620 – up to two Xeon E5-1xxx or E5-2xxx series (4/6/8/10/12 core) processors
- HP Z820 – up to two Xeon 2600 series (6/8 core) processors

Z Series Generation 3 (2015 - 2018)

- HP Z2 Mini G3 – Intel Xeon (E3 v5 & v6), Core i7 (gen6/7), i5 or i3 processors
- HP Z240 – Intel Xeon (E3-12xx v5), Core i3, i5, i7
- HP Z440 – Intel Xeon: E5-1600 v3, E5-2600 v3, E5-2600 v4 or E5-1600 v4 processors
- HP Z640 – Intel Xeon: E5-1600 v3 or E5-2600 v3/v4 processors
- HP Z840 – Intel Xeon: E5-2600 v4 or E5-2600 v3 processors

Z Series Generation 4 (2019 on)

- HP Z2 Mini G4 - Intel Xeon (E-2100) or gen8 Core i7, i5, i3 processors
- HP Z4 G4 – Intel Xeon (W2100), Core i7 X-Series or i9 X-Series processors, up to 18 cores
- HP Z6 G4 – Intel Xeon: Bronze 3100, Silver 4100, Gold 5100 or 6100, or Platinum 8100 scalable processors, up to 48 cores
- HP Z8 G4 – Intel Xeon: Bronze 3100, Silver 4100, Gold 5100 or 6100, or Platinum 8100 scalable processors, up to 56 cores

=== Blade Workstations ===
- HP xw25p
- HP xw460c

== Servers ==
=== x86 (Intel & AMD Opteron) based ===
==== Entry-level servers ====
Entry-level servers used either the NetServer or ProLiant brands. The NetServer line of servers were discontinued following the merger with Compaq in 2002, with the then-newly acquired ProLiant line of servers succeeding it afterwards. The ProLiant line of servers was then acquired by Hewlett Packard Enterprise in 2015 after HP split up into two separate companies.

ProLiant servers made by Compaq from 1993–2002 came with utilities such as SmartStart and Insight Manager among others, which applied to all pre-merger ProLiant models. Post-merger ProLiant models made by HP (and later HPE) kept the aforementioned utilities for a few years until they were replaced with their HP/HPE equivalents following HP's acquisition of Compaq in 2002; the Insight Manager for example was replaced with HP Systems Insight Manager and HP/HPE Insight Management Agents around 2002–2003 while SmartStart was offered until the ProLiant Gen8 models in 2012.

The entry-level ProLiant servers made by HP after the 2002 merger were unrelated to the previous ProLiant models offered by Compaq despite using the ProLiant name, as they were based on HP's former NetServer line from 1993–2002 (these models were specifically based on the NetServer tc series) and never came shipped with the aforementioned utilities that were formerly provided by Compaq, which also applies to all other post-merger ProLiant models made by HP (and later HPE), especially after acquiring Compaq in 2002.

===== NetServer =====
- HP NetServer LPr
- HP NetServer LP1000R (retired)
- HP NetServer LP2000R (retired)
- HP NetServer LH3 (retired)
- HP NetServer LH3R (retired)
- HP NetServer LH4 (retired)
- HP NetServer LH4R (retired)
- HP NetServer LH3000 (retired)
- HP NetServer LH6000 (retired)
- HP NetServer LHX8000 (retired)
- HP NetServer LHX8500 (retired)

===== ProLiant ML =====
These are in a tower form factor.

====== G1 (retired) ======
- Compaq ML330
- Compaq ML330e
- Compaq ML350
- Compaq ML370
- Compaq ML530
- Compaq ML570
- Compaq ML750

====== G2 (retired) ======
Marketed as Compaq (pre-merger)

- Compaq ML330
- Compaq ML350
- Compaq ML370

Marketed as HP (post-merger)

- HP ML110
- HP ML150
- HP ML370
- HP ML530
- HP ML570

====== G3 (retired) ======
- HP ML110
- HP ML150
- HP ML310
- HP ML330
- HP ML350
- HP ML370
- HP ML570

====== G4 (retired) ======
ML 100 series

- HP ML110
- HP ML110 storage server
- HP ML115
- HP ML150

ML 300 series

- HP ML310
- HP ML330
- HP ML350
- HP ML350 storage server
- HP ML370

====== G5 (retired) ======
ML 100 series

- HP ML110
- HP ML110 storage server
- HP ML115
- HP ML150

ML 300 series

- HP ML310
- HP ML350
- HP ML350 storage server
- HP ML370

====== G6 (retired) ======
ML100 series

- HP ML110
- HP ML150

ML300 series

- HP ML330
- HP ML350
- HP ML370

====== G7 (retired) ======
ML100 series

- HP ML110

====== Gen8 (retired) ======
ML300 series

- HP ML310e
- HP ML350e
- HP ML350p

====== Gen9 (retired) ======
Marketed as HP (pre-split)

- HP ML10
- HP ML10 V2
- HP ML30
- HP ML110
- HP ML150
- HP ML350

Marketed as HPE (post-split)

- HPE ML10
- HPE ML30
- HPE ML110
- HPE ML350

====== Gen10 ======
- HPE ML30
- HPE ML110
- HPE ML350

===== ProLiant DL =====
These are in a rack mount form factor.

- HP DL140 G2 (retired)
- HP DL145 G2 (retired)
- HP DL140 G3 (retired)
- HP DL145 G3 (retired)
- HP DL120 G5 (retired)
- HP DL165 G5 (retired)
- HP DL185 G5 (retired)
- HP DL160 G6
- HP DL180 G6 (retired)

==== ProLiant ====
A series of servers under the ProLiant brand, originally made by Compaq. The ProLiant brand was acquired by HP in 2002 during their merger with Compaq and later acquired by Hewlett Packard Enterprise in 2015.

ProLiant servers made by Compaq from 1993–2002 came with utilities such as SmartStart and Insight Manager among others, which applied to all pre-merger ProLiant models. Post-merger ProLiant models made by HP (and later HPE) kept the aforementioned utilities for a few years until they were replaced with their HP/HPE equivalents following HP's acquisition of Compaq in 2002; the Insight Manager for example was replaced with HP Systems Insight Manager and HP/HPE Insight Management Agents around 2002–2003 while SmartStart was offered until the ProLiant Gen8 models in 2012.

===== ProLiant ML Series =====
These are in a tower form factor. 'e' indicates 'essential' and 'p' indicates 'performance' variants.

Compaq ProLiant ML310

- ProLiant ML310 G2 (retired)
- ProLiant ML310 G3 (retired)
- ProLiant ML310 G4 (retired)
- ProLiant ML310 G5 (retired in China and India)
- ProLiant ML310 G5p
- HP ProLiant ML310e Gen8
- HP ProLiant ML310e Gen8 v2

Compaq ProLiant ML330

- Compaq ProLiant ML330 G2 (retired)
- HP ProLiant ML330 G6

Compaq ProLiant ML350

- Compaq ProLiant ML350 G2
- ProLiant ML350 G3
- ProLiant ML350 G4
- ProLiant ML350 G4p
- ProLiant ML350 G5
- HP ProLiant ML350 G6
- HP ProLiant ML350e Gen8
- HP ProLiant ML350e Gen8 v2
- HP ProLiant ML350p Gen8
- HP ProLiant ML350 Gen9
- HP ProLiant ML350 Gen10

Compaq ProLiant ML370

- Compaq ProLiant ML370 G2 (retired)
- Compaq ProLiant ML370 G3 (retired)
- ProLiant ML370 G4
- ProLiant ML370 G5
- HP ProLiant ML370 G6

Compaq ProLiant ML570

- ProLiant ML570 G2 (retired)

===== ProLiant DL Series =====
These are in a rack mount form factor.

Compaq ProLiant DL320 (1U, single processor server)

- ProLiant DL320 G2 (retired)
- ProLiant DL320 G3 (retired)
- ProLiant DL320 G4 (retired)
- ProLiant DL320 G5
- ProLiant DL320 G6

Compaq ProLiant DL360 (1U, 2-processor server, 2hot swap Compaq universal hard disks)

- Compaq ProLiant DL360 G2 (introduced Compaq Integrated Lights-Out)
- ProLiant DL360 G3 (retired)
- ProLiant DL360 G4 (retired)
- ProLiant DL360 G4p (retired)
- ProLiant DL360 G5 (up to 6 SFF SAS hard disks)
- ProLiant DL360 G6 (up to 8 SFF SAS hard disks)
- ProLiant DL360 G7 (up to 8 SFF SAS hard disks)
- ProLiant DL360 G8 (up to 8 SFF SAS hard disks)
- ProLiant DL360E G8 (up to 8 SFF SAS hard disks)

ProLiant DL365 (retired)

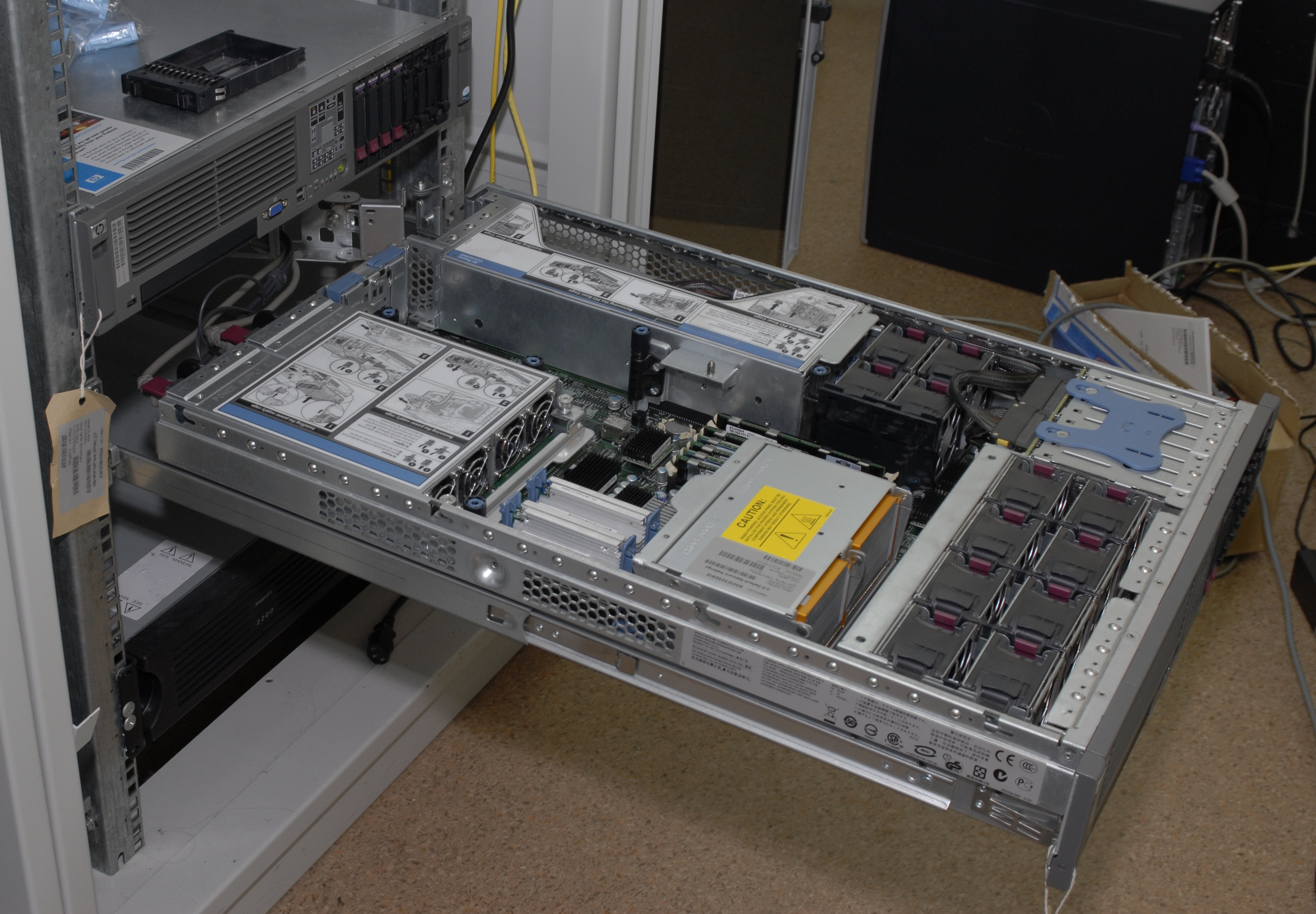
ProLiant DL380 G5

Compaq ProLiant DL380

- Compaq ProLiant DL380 G2 (changed to 2U chassis, 6 hot swap Compaq universal hard disks; retired)
- ProLiant DL380 G3 (retired)
- ProLiant DL380 G4 (retired)
- ProLiant DL380 G5 (retired)
- ProLiant DL380 G6 (up to 16 SFF or 6 LFF SAS hard disks) (retired)
- ProLiant DL380 G7 (up to 16 SFF or 6 LFF SAS hard disks)

ProLiant DL385

- ProLiant DL385 G2
- ProLiant DL385 G5
- ProLiant DL385 G5p
- ProLiant DL385 G6
- ProLiant DL385 G7

ProLiant DL560

DL560 G1

DL560 Gen8

ProLiant DL580

- ProLiant DL580 G2 (retired)
- ProLiant DL580 G3 (retired)
- ProLiant DL580 G4
- ProLiant DL580 G5 (supports up to four Quad-Core Intel Xeon)
- ProLiant DL580 G6
- ProLiant DL580 G7

ProLiant DL585 (supports two or four dual-core AMD Opteron)

- ProLiant DL585 G2 (supports two or four dual-core AMD Opteron)
- ProLiant DL585 G5 (supports two or four quad-core AMD Opteron)
- ProLiant DL585 G6

ProLiant DL740 (retired)

Compaq ProLiant DL760 (retired)

- ProLiant DL760 G2 (retired)

ProLiant DL785 (supports up to eight quad-core AMD Opteron)

- ProLiant DL785 G6

ProLiant DL980 G7 (supports up to 8 Intel Xeon E7-4800 and 7500 series processors)

===== ProLiant CL Series =====
These are in a cabinet form factor.

Compaq ProLiant CL1850 (retired)

Compaq ProLiant CL830 (retired)

- Compaq ProLiant CL830 G2 (retired)

===== ProLiant BLp blades =====
These are in a blade form factor.

ProLiant BL20p

- G1
- G2
- G3
- G4
- G5

ProLiant BL25p

- G1
- G2
- G3
- G4
- G5

ProLiant BL30p

- G1
- G2
- G3
- G4
- G5

ProLiant BL35p

- G1
- G2
- G3
- G4
- G5

ProLiant BL40p

- G1
- G2
- G3
- G4
- G5

ProLiant BL45p

- G1
- G2
- G3
- G4
- G5

===== ProLiant BLc blades =====
ProLiant BL2x220c

- G1
- G5
- G6
- G7
- G8
- G9

ProLiant BL260c (G5 only)

ProLiant BL280c (G6 only)

ProLiant BL460c

- G1
- G5
- G6
- G7
- Gen8
- Gen9

ProLiant BL465c

- G1
- G5
- G6
- G7
- G8
- G9

ProLiant BL480c

- G1
- G5
- G6
- G7
- G8
- G9

ProLiant BL490c

- G1
- G5
- G6
- G7
- G8
- G9

Proliant BL495c

- G1
- G5
- G6
- G7
- G8
- G9

Proliant BL660c (G8)

ProLiant BL680c

- G1
- G5
- G6
- G7
- G8
- G9

ProLiant BL685c

- G1
- G5
- G6
- G7
- G8
- G9

=== Itanium based ===
HPE Integrity Servers

- rx1600 series – 1U
  - rx1600
  - rx1620
- rx2600 series – 2U
  - rx2600
  - rx2620
  - rx2660
- rx3600 – 4U
- rx4610 – 7U
- rx4640 – 4U
- rx5670 – 7U
- rx6600 – 7U
- rx7600 series – 10U
  - rx7610
  - rx7620
  - rx7640
- rx8600 series – 17U
  - rx8620
  - rx8640
- HP Superdome
  - SX1000 based – SX2000 based

Integrity BL blades

- BL60p
- BL860c
- BL870c

Compaq ProLiant

- Compaq ProLiant DL590/64 (retired)

=== Alpha based ===
- AlphaServer GS1280
- Alphaserver GS160
- AlphaServer ES80
- AlphaServer ES47
- Alphaserver ES40
- AlphaServer DS25
- Alphaserver DS20
- AlphaServer DS15
- Alphaserver DS10

=== PA-RISC based ===
- rp3410
- rp3440
- rp4410
- rp4440
- rp7405
- rp7410
- rp7420
- rp8400
- rp8420

=== Scalable servers and supercomputer nodes ===
==== Apollo series ====
- HPE ProLiant XL260a Gen9 Server
- HPE Apollo k6000 Chassis
- HPE ProLiant XL230k Gen10 Server
- HPE ProLiant XL230a Gen9 Server
- HPE ProLiant XL750f Gen9 Server
- HPE ProLiant XL740f Gen9 Server
- HPE ProLiant XL170r Gen10 Server
- HPE ProLiant XL190r Gen10 Server
- HPE Apollo 2000 System
- HPE Apollo 4510 Gen10 System
- HPE Apollo kl20 Server
- HPE Apollo 4200 Gen10 Server
- HPE Apollo 6500 Gen9 System
- HPE Apollo sx40 Server
- HPE Apollo pc40 Server
- HPE Apollo 6500 Gen10 System
- HPE Apollo 70 System
- HPE Apollo f8000 Rack
- HPE Apollo 8000 iCDU Rack
- HPE Apollo 6000 Power Shelf
- HPE Apollo 6000 Chassis
- HPE ProLiant XL730f Gen9 Server
- HPE Apollo 35 System
- HPE ProLiant XL170r Gen9 Server
- HPE ProLiant XL190r Gen9 Server
- HPE Apollo r2000 Chassis
- HPE ProLiant XL450 Gen9 Server
- HPE Apollo 4200 Gen9 Server

==== SGI series ====
- HPE SGI 8600

== Enterprise storage ==
- HP StorageWorks XP storage array
- StorageWorks EVA storage array (from Compaq)
- HP AutoRAID storage array (retired)
- HP VA storage array (retired)
- HP Jamaica storage enclosure (retired)

== "StorageWorks" storage element managers ==
- Command View XP
- Command View AE
- Command View EVA
- Command View SDM.
- StorageWorks Command View TL

== Storage area management ==
- HP Storage Essentials
- OpenView Storage Area Manager

== ProCurve ==
ProCurve Networking by HP is the networking division of HP.

== Telepresence and videoconferencing ==
- HP Halo, a high-end immersive telepresence system, was sold to Polycom on June 1, 2011.

== External hard disk drives ==
- HP External Hard Drive (1 TB, USB 3.0)
- HP Portable Hard Drive (1 TB, USB 3.0)
- HP USB Flash Drive (16 GB)

== External optical disk drives ==
- HP DVD-R Drive

== External tape drives and libraries ==
=== HP SureStore series ===
==== Tape libraries ====
All sold in either the DLT 8K or Ultrium 230 format.

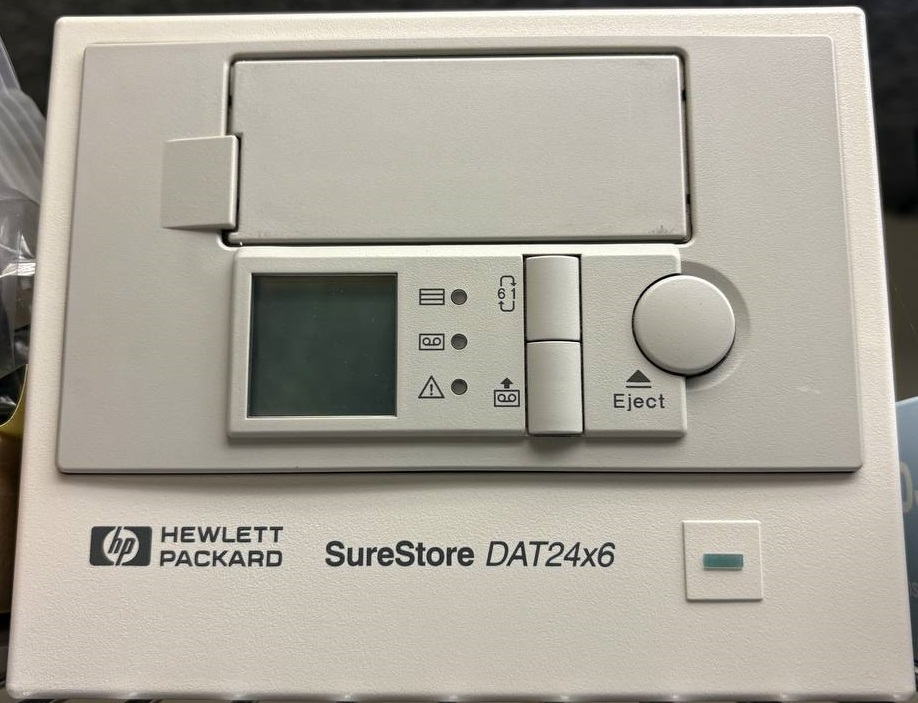
HP SureStore tape library

- SureStore 10/180
- SureStore 20/700
- SureStore 10/100
- SureStore 8/80
- SureStore 6/60
- SureStore 4/40
- SureStore 2/20

==== Autoloaders ====
- SureStore 1/9 (Ultrium 230, DLT-1, or DLT 8K)

== Docking stations ==
- HP xb3000

== See also ==
- List of Palm OS devices
- List of Dell PowerEdge Servers
