= Tx2 =

Tx2 may refer to:

- HP Pavilion TX1000 Series Tablet PC, a laptop computer series from Hewlett Packard
- TXII, a London Taxi model
- TX-2, an MIT Lincoln Laboratory computer released in 1958, known for its role in advancing both artificial intelligence and human–computer interaction, including Sketchpad, an early computer-aided design program with a graphical user interface
