= HP 300LX =

Personal computer

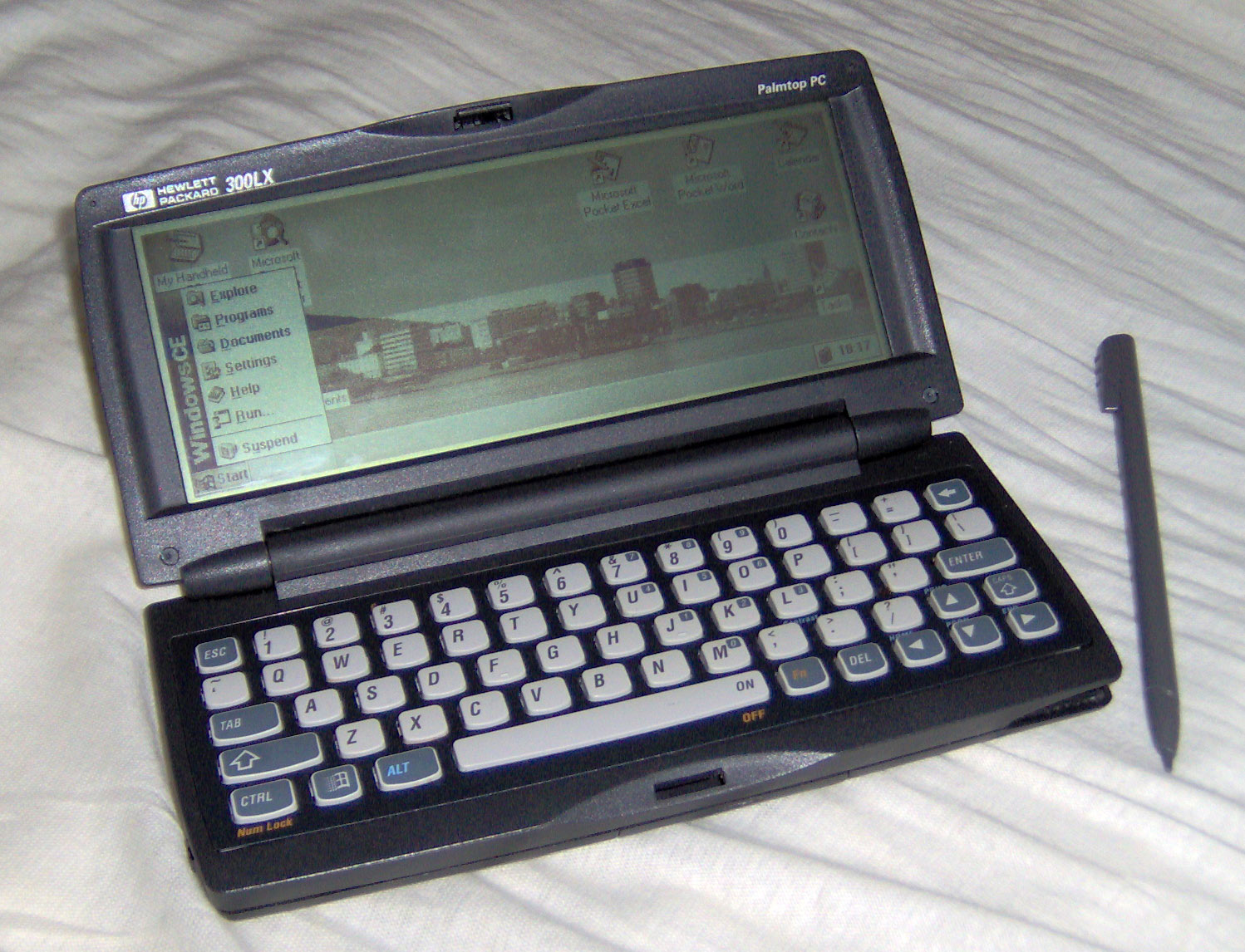
- Developer: Hewlett Packard
- Type: Palmtop
- Operating system: Windows CE 1.0
- CPU: 44 MHz Hitachi SH-3
- Memory: RAM: 2 MB; ROM: 5 MB
- Display: 640x240 pixels, 4 grayscales
- Input: Keyboard, touchscreen
- Connectivity: PCMCIA Type I, Serial, Infrared
- Power: 2 x AA batteries, 5.25v AC adapter
- Successor: HP 320LX

The HP 300LX was one of the first handheld PCs designed to run the Windows CE 1.0 operating system from Microsoft. Originally announced in 1996, the HP 300LX was released together with the 320LX in the second quarter of 1997. Unlike other HPCs of the time, the resistive touch screen had a higher screen resolution of 640x240 with four shades of grey, rather than the standard 480x240 resolution of other devices, such as the Casio Cassiopeia A-10. The device also sported a full PC card slot, a serial link cable plug, and an infrared port.

It was released with 'Pocket' versions of Microsoft applications, such as Word and Excel, and PIM applications such as Tasks, Calendar and Contacts. A very basic version of Internet Explorer was included with Windows CE. Version 1.0 (with an update to 1.1 released shortly after), Inbox was also included for email capability. Access to the internet required use of 3rd party PCMCIA card modem or network card.

The device was made of moulded grey plastic with a lighter grey plastic stylus which is stored on the right hand side of the device under the keyboard. The left hand side of the device is taken up by the PCMCIA card slot and eject button. On the right hand side towards the back is the infrared port. On the back of the device is the proprietary serial connection which has a maximum baud rate of 115,200 bit/s and the power adapter port. Power for the device was provided by 2 AA batteries with a CR2032 backup battery to save user data when the 2 AA batteries ran out. A single mono speaker, ROM door and battery compartment are located on the underside of the device.

In the box:

- HP 300LX
- User manual
- Serial cable
- 3rd party software CD
- Handheld PC Explorer software CD

== HP 320LX and 360LX ==
=== 320LX ===
The HP 320LX, released in 1997 alongside the 300LX, was an improved version of the 300LX. It was largely identical to its sister unit, but included a backlit screen, an increase in RAM from 2 MB to 4 MB, and a dedicated compact flash slot. It was also upgradable to Windows CE 2.0 (which required a physical replacement of the ROM card containing the OS). The 320LX came boxed with an AC adapter and serial cradle in addition to the standard equipment from 300LX.

=== 360LX ===
A later variant, HP 360LX, increased the RAM to 8 MB and increased the CPU clock speed to 60 MHz. It also shipped with Windows CE 2.0. The 360LX was released on November 10, 1997 at a starting price of $699.

=== Ericsson MC12 and MC16 ===
Ericsson marketed re-branded variants of the 320LX and 360LX named MC12 and MC16, respectively. They consisted of essentially the same hardware, but were shipped with a cable and software combo that allowed for using select Ericsson phones as modems.

== See also ==
- List of HP Pocket Computers
- HP 320LX
- HP 620LX
- HP 660LX
