= HP 620LX =

Handheld PC released by HP in 1998

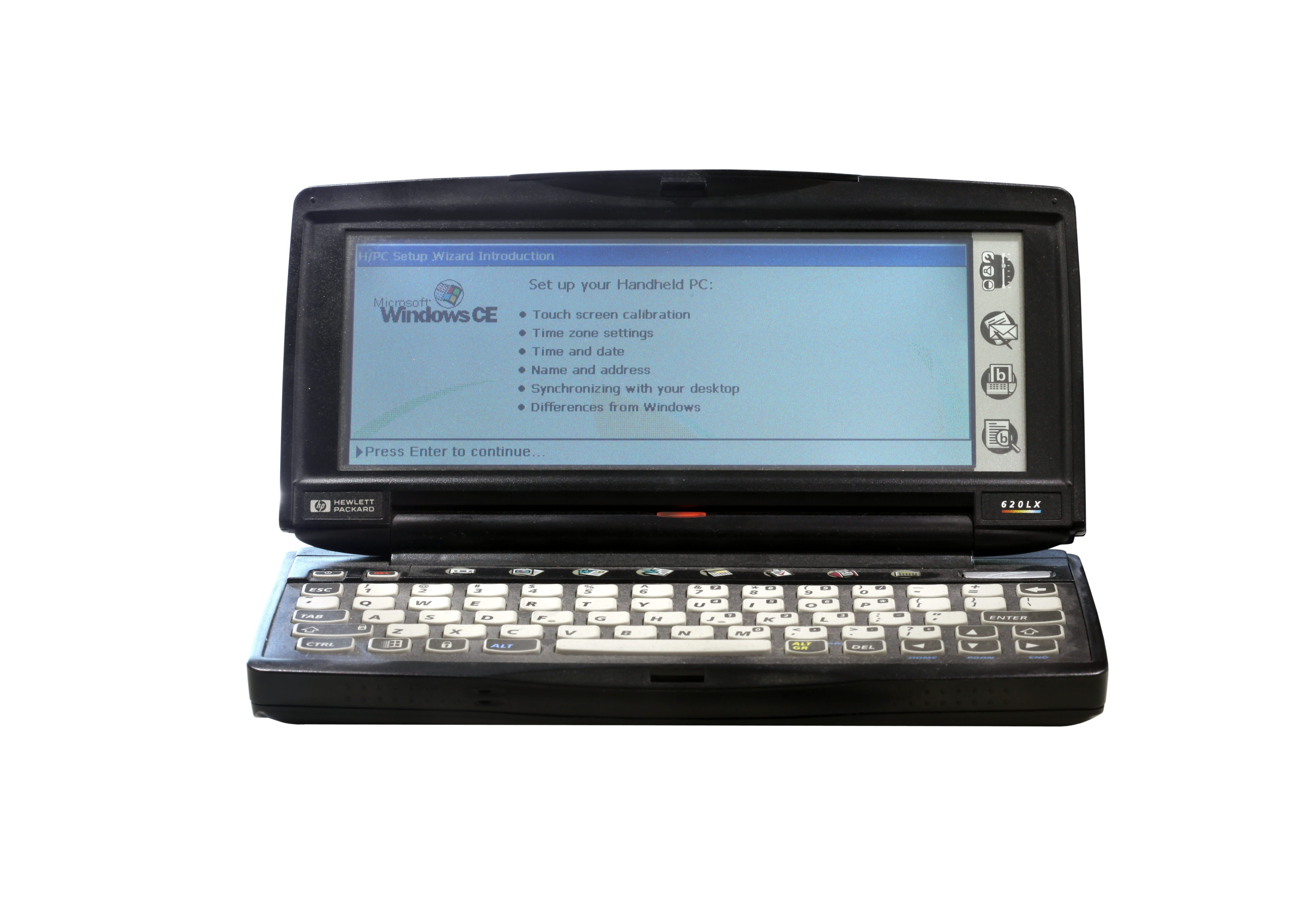
- Developer: Hewlett-Packard
- Type: Palmtop
- Operating system: Windows CE 2.0
- CPU: 75 MHz Hitachi SH-3
- Memory: 16 MB
- Display: 640x240 pixels
- Input: Keyboard, touchscreen
- Connectivity: CompactFlash Type I
- Successor: HP 660LX

The HP 620LX (F1250A, F1259A) is a palmtop computer released by Hewlett-Packard in March 1998. It was shipped with Windows CE 2.0 or 2.11 and included a CompactFlash Type I card slot, a PC card slot, a serial link cable plug, and an infrared port. It has 16 MB of RAM and a Hitachi SH3 processor running at 75 MHz. It also has a 256-color display with a resolution of 640x240. The screen is backlit.

It is internet capable by attaching an add-on modem or through an Ethernet or Wi-Fi card. Only Type I PC cards are supported, and special drivers for Windows CE are required.

The 620LX had a MSRP of $889 USD.

== In popular culture ==
The device features prominently in the fifth season of the medical drama ER. Medical student Lucy Knight brings her personal HP 620LX to her internship, where it becomes a plot point in several episodes.

== See also ==
- List of HP pocket computers
- HP 300LX
- HP 320LX
- HP 660LX
