= HP-27 =

Scientific and financial calculator by Hewlett-Packard

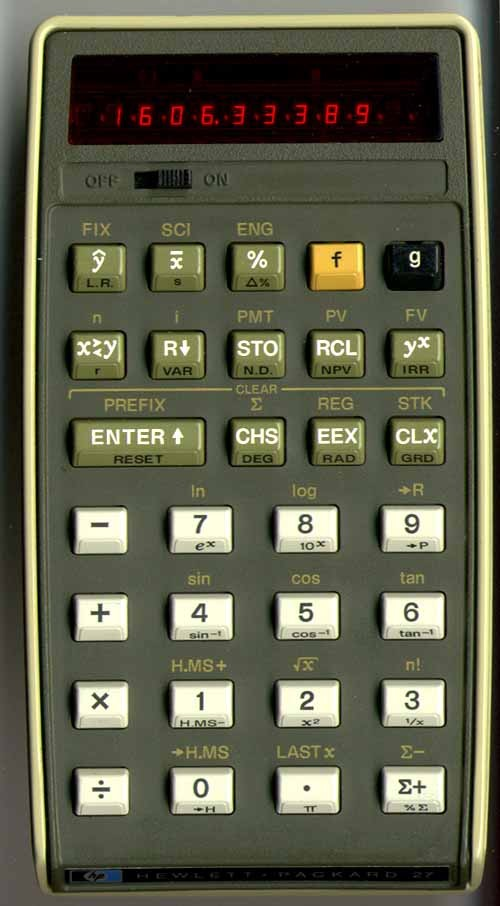
A HP 27

The HP-27 was a hand-held scientific and financial, but not programmable, calculator made by Hewlett-Packard between 1976 and 1978.

Unlike all previous HP's pocket calculators, the HP-27 could do mathematic, statistic and business operations. It used Reverse Polish Notation (RPN) for calculations, working on a four-level stack (x,y,z,t). Nearly all keys had two alternate functions, accessed by a yellow and black prefix key. So despite the 30 keys only keyboard it could access about 68 functions. The HP-27 also had a 10-digit red LED display and 10 registers to store numbers.

== See also ==
- List of Hewlett-Packard products: Pocket calculators
- HP calculators
