= HP 660LX =

- Developer: Hewlett Packard
- Type: Palmtop
- Operating system: Windows CE 2.0 / Windows CE 2.11
- CPU: 75 MHz Hitachi SH-3
- Memory: 32 MB
- Display: 640x240 pixels
- Input: Keyboard, Touchscreen
- Connectivity: CompactFlash Type I
- Predecessor: HP 620LX

The HP 660LX (F1270A) is a handheld palmtop organizer that runs Windows CE 2.0 or 2.11 that launched in 1998. It is similar to the previous model, the HP 620LX. It has a CompactFlash Type I card slot, a PC card slot, a serial link cable plug, and an infrared port.

It is internet capable by attaching an add-on modem or through an Ethernet or Wi-Fi card. Only Type I PC cards are supported and special drivers for the Windows CE operating system are required.

On June 4, 1998, the 660LX was announced to ship in the month of July with a 75Mhz Hitachi SH-3 RISC processor and 32Mb of RAM at a price of $999.

By August 1998, the 660LX was available for purchase through corporate resellers including CompUSA.

== Compared to the 620LX ==
- The 660LX has 32MB of RAM, compared to only 16MB on the 620LX.
- The 660LX is bundled with a 56kbps fax/modem card.
- The 660LX includes Microsoft Windows CE Services 2.1 on CD, whereas the 620LX uses Services 2.0.

== See also ==
- List of HP pocket computers
- HP 300LX
- HP 320LX
- HP 620LX
