= HP Pavilion dv1000 series =

Laptop model series by HP

HP Pavilion dv1000
- Developer: Hewlett-Packard (HP Inc.)
- Manufacturer: Quanta Computer Inc.
- Type: Laptop
- Released: August 27, 2004; 22 years ago
- Lifespan: 2004–2006
- Discontinued: 2006; 20 years ago
- Display: 14.1" or 14.3"
- Successor: dv2000
- Related: dv8000, dv5000, dv4000

The HP Pavilion dv1000 was a model series of laptops manufactured by Hewlett-Packard Company that featured 16:10 14.1" or 14.3" diagonal displays.

== Overview ==
First introduced in August 2004, the HP Pavilion dv1000 series was a series of "thin and light" widescreen laptops featuring a black and silver finish, and were marketed towards home and small business users. The size dimensions of the laptops were 13.1 in (330 mm) wide, 1.2 in (30 mm) deep, and 9 in (230 mm) thick. The laptops also weighed at about 5.26 lb (2.39 kg). Several different models and motherboard revisions were available, which included various Intel (single or dual core) or AMD CPUs, and IDE or SATA hard drives.

The following CPUs (and chipsets) were available:

- Intel Pentium M and Celeron M Banias and Dothan (855 and 910 chipsets)
- Intel Pentium Dual-Core, Core Solo, Core Duo (later models from 2006 onwards with 945 chipsets)
- AMD Athlon 64 X2 (nForce 4 or nForce 600 chipsets)

All models of this laptop series (as well as many other laptops in the HP Pavilion laptop line at the time) came with HP QuickPlay, which has the ability to boot into a dedicated environment for multimedia use without booting into the operating system. On models preinstalled with Windows Vista, the QuickPlay boot option was removed due to compatibility issues, but can still be accessed from within Windows via a separate application.

=== Manufacturing ===
Quanta Computer Inc., an original design manufacturer (ODM), manufacturers the hardware, motherboard, and design of the dv1000 series of laptops alongside the dv4000, dv5000, and dv8000 series (and later the dv2000, dv6000, and dv9000 series). Quanta also manufactures the HP Pavilion and Compaq Presario ze2000 series, Compaq Presario V2000 series, and HP Compaq nx4800 series of laptops in cooperation with HP, which were equivalent clones of the dv1000 series. This was a common practice by many other brands of the era.

=== Problems ===
The dv1000 series may have a problem with the laptop's battery charging/internal power system, where the notebook will not receive DC power when plugged in. This issue has not yet been resolved.

== Models ==
The dv1000 series is divided into several different sub-lines, each with different features.

=== Pavilion dv1000 ===
Initial models released in 2004. Comes with either Intel Celeron M (1.4/1.5 GHz) or Pentium M (1.4-1.8 GHz) processors with up to 1 or 2 GB of DDR SDRAM. All models came shipped with Windows XP preinstalled, with some models having the option of FreeDOS.

Pavilion dv1040 — The 1040 contains a Pentium M CPU with a published speed of approx. 1700 MHz (1.7 GHz). Maximum RAM is up to 2 GB.

=== Pavilion dv1400 ===
Refreshed model of the dv1000 series released in the mid 2000s. All models came shipped with Windows XP preinstalled.

=== Pavilion dv1600 ===
Refreshed models released in 2006. Some hardware changes. Comes with either Intel Celeron M, Core Solo or Core Duo processors with up to 2 GB of DDR2 SDRAM, and a slightly larger screen size of 14.3". Uses SATA for hard drive connections instead of IDE. Speakers are provided by either Altec Lansing or Harman Kardon. Optional built-in webcam and microphones are included in some models. Most models came shipped with Windows XP preinstalled.

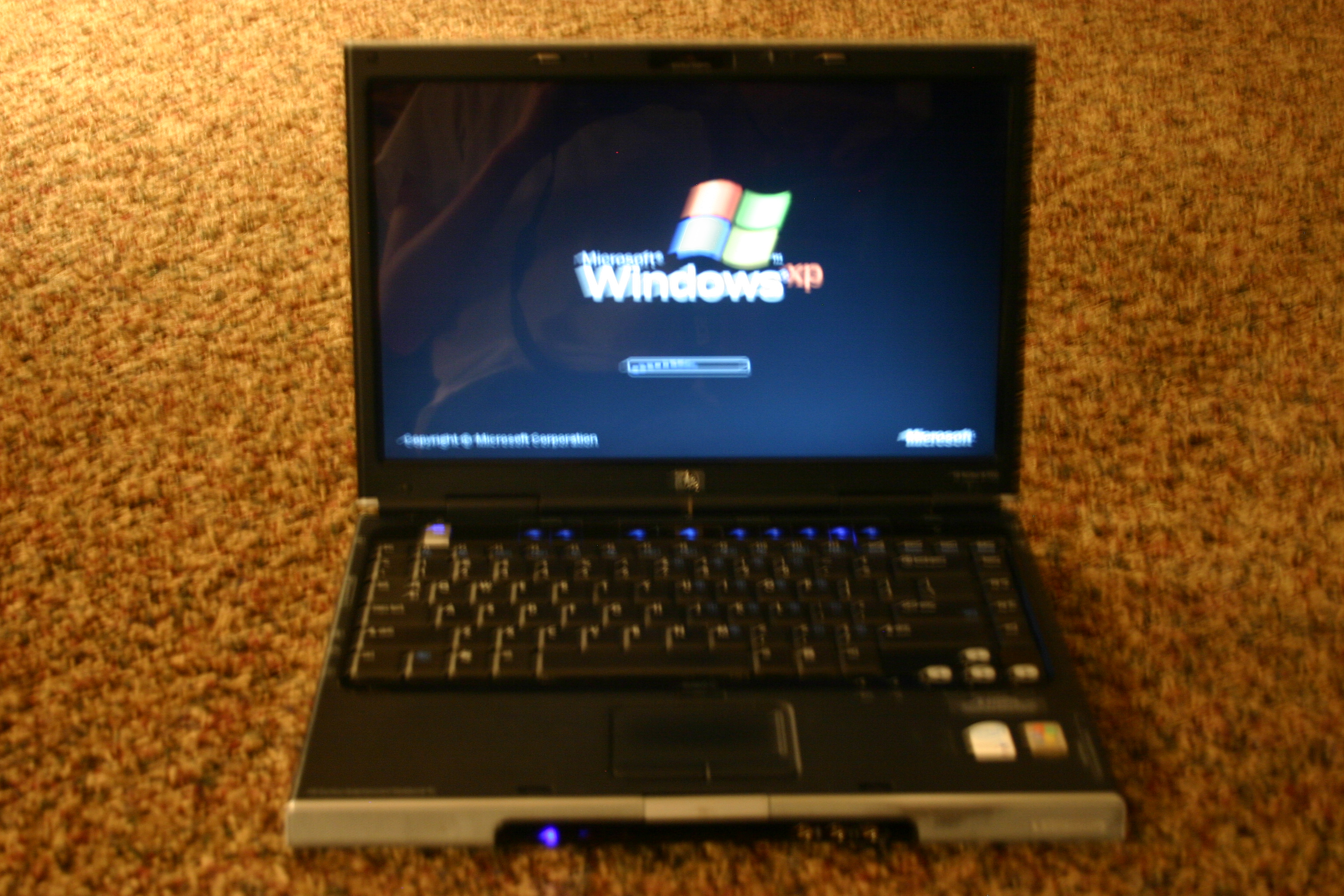
Pavilion dv1658

Pavilion dv1658 — The 1658 used an Intel Centrino platform with a Core Duo dual core processor with virtualization support with a published speed of approx. 1663 MHz (1.6 GHz). The minimum RAM capacity is 512 MB, with the possibility of upgrading to 2 GB.
