= HP-22 =

Finance calculator by Hewlett-Packard

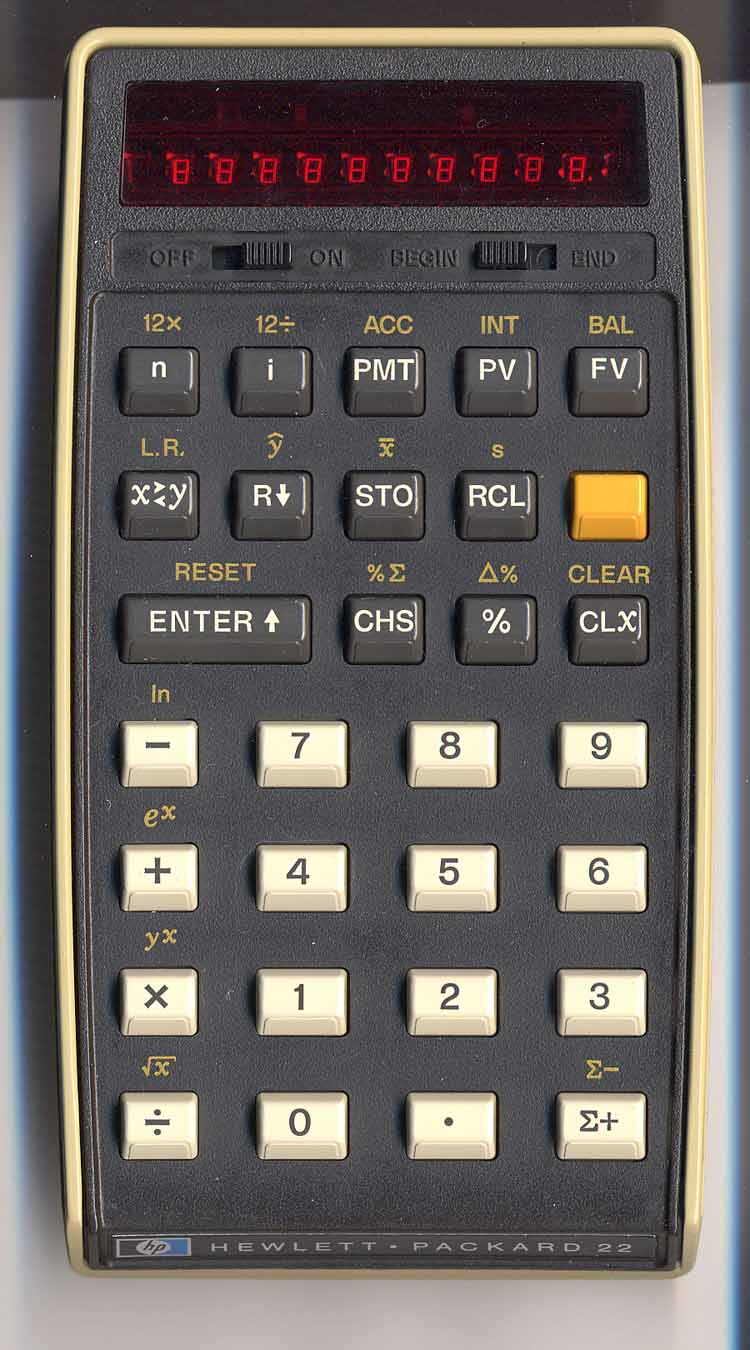
A HP-22

The HP-22 was a finance-oriented pocket calculator produced by Hewlett-Packard between 1975 and 1978. It was designed as a replacement for the short-lived HP-70, and was one of a set of three calculators, the others being the HP-21 and HP-25, which were similarly built but aimed at different markets.

As with most HP calculators then and now, the HP-25 used RPN entry logic, with a four-level stack. It also had ten user-accessible memory registers. As was normal at the time, memory was not preserved on power-down. Its principal functions were (1) time value of money (TVM) calculations, where the user could enter any three of the variables and the fourth would be calculated, and (2) statistics calculations, including linear regression. Basic logarithmic and exponential functions were also provided. For TVM calculations, a physical slider switch labelled "begin" and "end" could be used to specify whether payments would be applied at the beginning or end of periods. It had a 12-digit LED display. A shift key provided access to functions whose legends were printed on the faceplate above the corresponding keys.

Its HP development codename was Turnip, and it was a member of the Woodstock series. Its US price was $165 in 1975, $125 in 1978.

A version adapted to support an additional backward-facing display manufactured by Educational Calculator Devices named EduCALC 22 GD existed as well.
