= HP-21 =

Scientific calculator by Hewlett-Packard

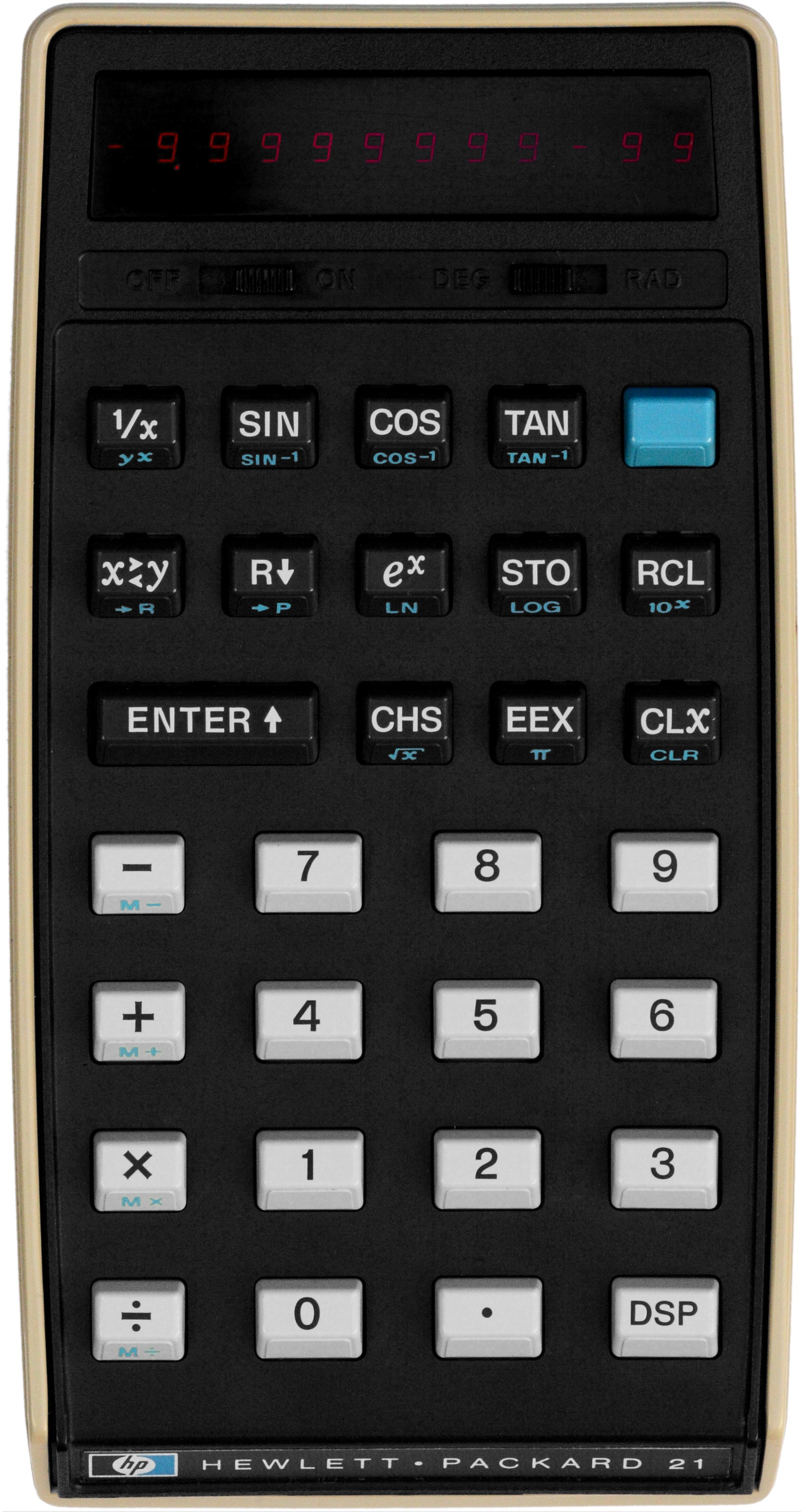
A HP-21

The HP-21 was a scientific calculator produced by Hewlett-Packard between 1975 and 1978. It was designed as a replacement for the HP-35, and was one of a set of three calculators, the others being the HP-22 and HP-25, which were similarly built but aimed at different markets.

As with most HP calculators then and now, the HP-21 used RPN entry logic, with a four-level stack. It also had a single user-accessible memory register. As was normal at the time, memory was not preserved on power-down. A physical slider switch toggled between degrees and radians modes, which was an unusual feature. It had a 12-digit LED display, which was less than the 15 digits of the HP-35. Because of these fewer digits the HP-21 (and similar calculators such as the HP-25) could display 10-digit floating point numbers but only an 8-digit mantissa with a 2-digit exponent when scientific notation was used. A shift key provided access to functions whose legends were printed on the fronts of the tall trapezoidal keys.

Its HP development codename was Pumpkin, and it was a member of the Woodstock series. Its US price was $125 in 1975, $80 in 1978.

A version adapted to support an additional backward-facing display manufactured by Educational Calculator Devices named EduCALC 21 GD existed as well.
