= HP LaserJet 4000 series =

Monochrome laser printer range

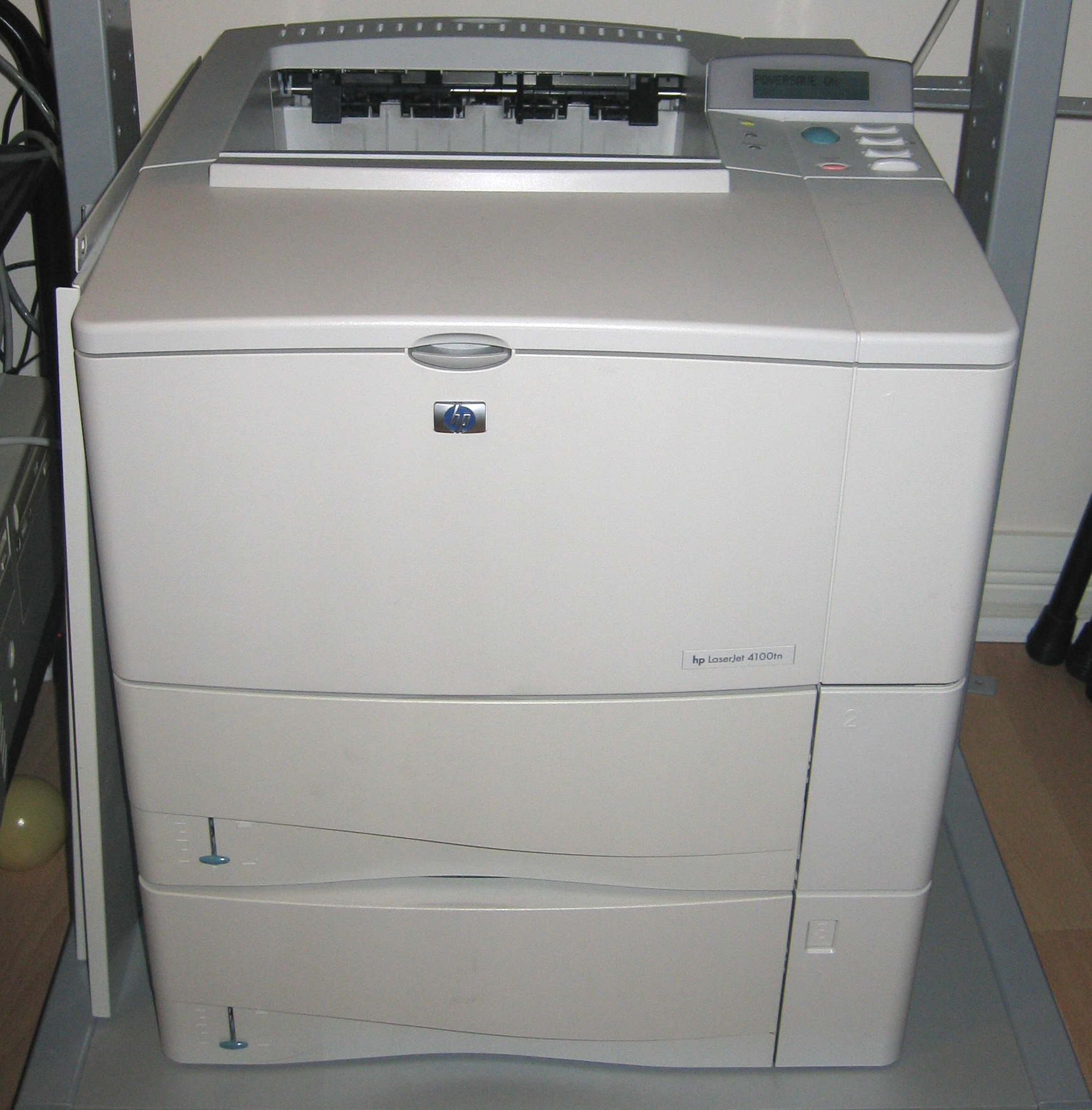
A HP LaserJet 4000/4050/4100 style printer with an extra 500-sheet tray (Tray 3).

The HP LaserJet 4000 series is Hewlett-Packard's medium-duty monochrome laser printer range and the successor to the HP LaserJet 5 series.

The LaserJet 4000 series, like most of Hewlett-Packard's laser printer series, follow the standard nomenclature for denoting factory-included features.

- n = network ready
- t = twin/two (smaller in some models) paper trays
- d = duplex/double sided printing
- s = stacker for output tray
- l = stapler.

Further accessories could also be purchased if the desired functions didn't come factory fitted on the model purchased. For example, network cards, additional trays and duplexing units are the most commonly found.

== LaserJet 4000 ==
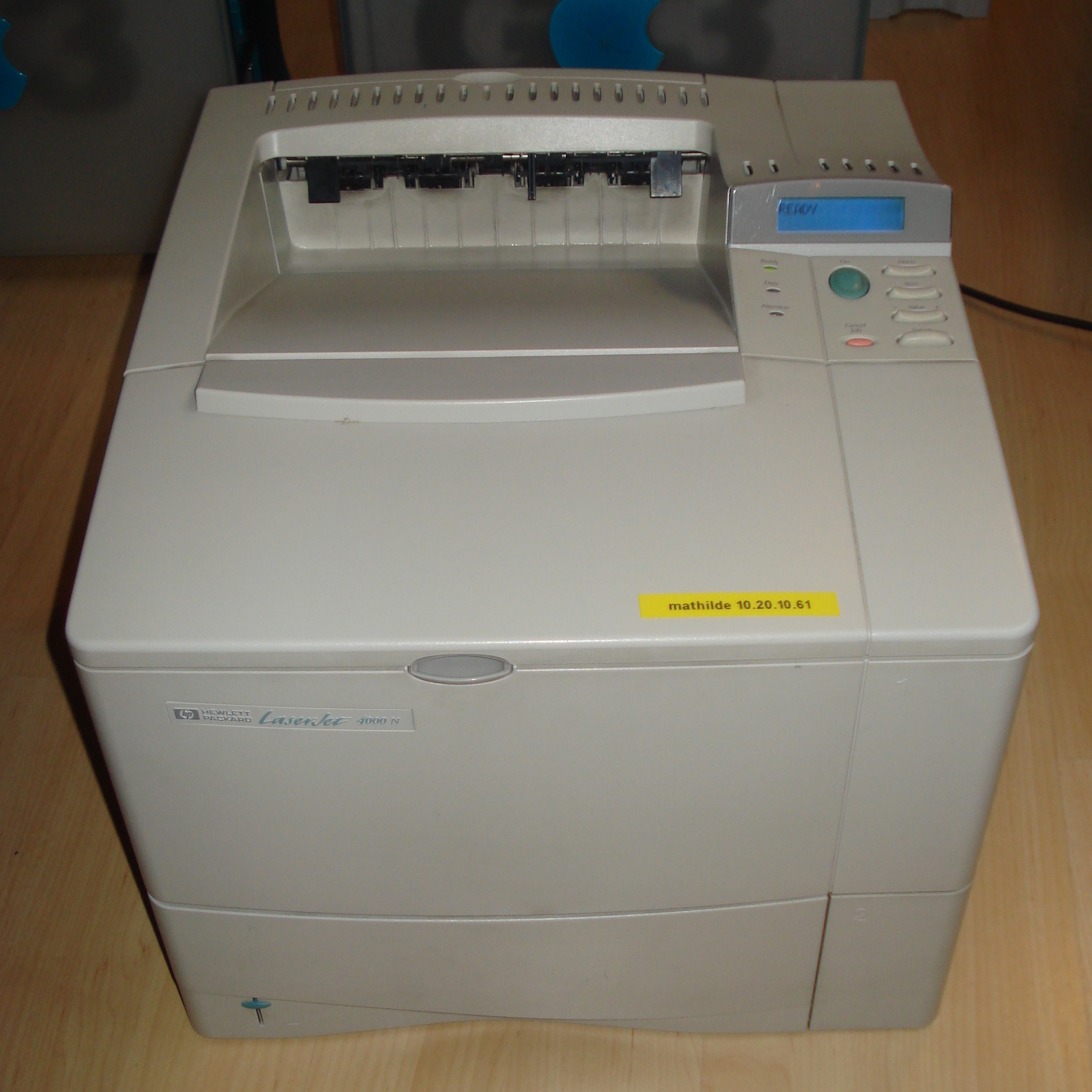
A HP LaserJet 4000n printer.

The LaserJet 4000/4050 and their respective variants were the first printers released in the 4000 series. The LaserJet 4000 series printers print letter paper at 17 pages per minute, and can be set to print at 600 dpi or 1200 dpi, although when set to print at true 1200 dpi, the printer runs at reduced speed. These printers may be connected to a computer using either the serial port, parallel port or Ethernet ( for the network capable "N" series ). The LaserJet 4000 series was introduced in November 1997 and was discontinued in May 1999. They are powered by a NEC VR4300 CPU.

Name	Model #	Description
LaserJet 4000	C4118A	4 MB RAM (internal); one 100-sheet multi-purpose tray (Tray 1); one 500-sheet tray (Tray 2).
LaserJet 4000T	C4119A	4 MB RAM (internal); one 100-sheet multi-purpose tray (Tray 1); one 250-sheet tray (Tray 2); one extra 250-sheet tray (Tray 3).
LaserJet 4000N	C4120A	8 MB RAM (4 MB internal); HP Jetdirect print server card (J3111A) for connecting to a network; one 100-sheet multi-purpose tray (Tray 1); one 500-sheet tray (Tray 2).
LaserJet 4000TN	C4121A	8 MB RAM (4 MB internal); HP Jetdirect print server card (J3111A) for connecting to a network; one 100-sheet multi-purpose tray (Tray 1); one 250-sheet tray (Tray 2); one extra 250-sheet tray (Tray 3).
LaserJet 4000se	C3094A	4 MB RAM (internal); one 500-sheet tray. HP LaserJet Internet Publishing software is also included.

Name	Model #	Description
LaserJet 4050	C4251A	8 MB RAM (internal); one 100-sheet multi-purpose tray (Tray 1); one 500-sheet tray (Tray 2).
LaserJet 4050T	C4252A	8 MB RAM (internal); one 100-sheet multi-purpose tray (Tray 1); one 250-sheet tray (Tray 2); one extra 250-sheet tray (Tray 3).
LaserJet 4050N	C4253A	16 MB RAM (8 MB internal); HP Jetdirect print server card (J3113A) for connecting to a network; one 100-sheet multi-purpose tray (Tray 1); one 500-sheet tray (Tray 2).
LaserJet 4050TN	C4254A	16 MB RAM (8 MB internal); HP Jetdirect print server card (J3113A) for connecting to a network; one 100-sheet multi-purpose tray (Tray 1); one 250-sheet tray (Tray 2); one extra 250-sheet tray (Tray 3).
LaserJet 4050se	C4255A	4 MB RAM (internal); one 100-sheet multi-purpose tray (Tray 1); one 500-sheet tray (Tray 2).
LaserJet 4050USB	C7829A	4 MB RAM (internal); USB; LocalTalk; one 100-sheet multi-purpose tray (Tray 1); one 500-sheet tray (Tray 2).

== LaserJet 4100 ==
The HP LaserJet 4100 series were replacements for the HP LaserJet 4000/4050 series of printers. The LaserJet 4100 series printers print letter paper at 25 pages per minute, and can be set to print at 600 dpi or 1200 dpi. Unlike the 4000 and 4050 series, the 4100 series printers are capable of printing at true 1200 dpi at full engine speed. These printers may be connected to a computer using either the serial port, parallel port or Ethernet ( for the network capable "N"series" ). The LaserJet 4100 series was introduced in March 2001 and was discontinued in February 2003. The 4100MFP, however, was introduced in March 2002, and discontinued in August 2006. They are all powered by a PMC-Sierra RM5261 CPU. 4100 was the last laser printer made in the USA as the 4200 was made in Japan.

Name	Model #	Description
LaserJet 4100	C8049A	16 MB RAM (internal); one 100-sheet multi-purpose tray (Tray 1); one 500-sheet tray (Tray 2)
LaserJet 4100T	C4119A	16 MB RAM (internal); one 100-sheet multi-purpose tray (Tray 1); one 500-sheet tray (Tray 2); one extra 500-sheet tray (Tray 3).
LaserJet 4100N	C8050A	32 MB RAM; HP Jetdirect print server card (J4169A) for connecting to a network; one 100-sheet multi-purpose tray (Tray 1); one 500-sheet tray (Tray 2)
LaserJet 4100TN	C8051A	32 MB RAM; HP Jetdirect print server card (J4169A) for connecting to a network; one 100-sheet multi-purpose tray (Tray 1); one 500-sheet tray (Tray 2); one extra 500-sheet tray (Tray 3).
LaserJet 4100DTN	C8052A	32 MB RAM; duplexer; HP Jetdirect print server card (J4169A) for connecting to a network; one 100-sheet multi-purpose tray (Tray 1); one 500-sheet tray (Tray 2); one extra 500-sheet tray (Tray 3).
LaserJet 4100mfp	C9148A	64 MB RAM; 5GB (or larger) hard disk; HP Jetdirect print server card (J4169A) for connecting to a network; one 100-sheet multi-purpose tray (Tray 1); one 500-sheet tray (Tray 2); automatic document feeder (ADF).
LaserJet 4101mfp	C9149A	64 MB RAM; 5GB (or larger) hard disk; duplexer; HP Jetdirect print server card (J4169A) for connecting to a network; one 100-sheet multi-purpose tray (Tray 1); one 500-sheet tray (Tray 2); one extra 500-sheet tray (Tray 3); automatic document feeder (ADF).

== LaserJet 4200 ==
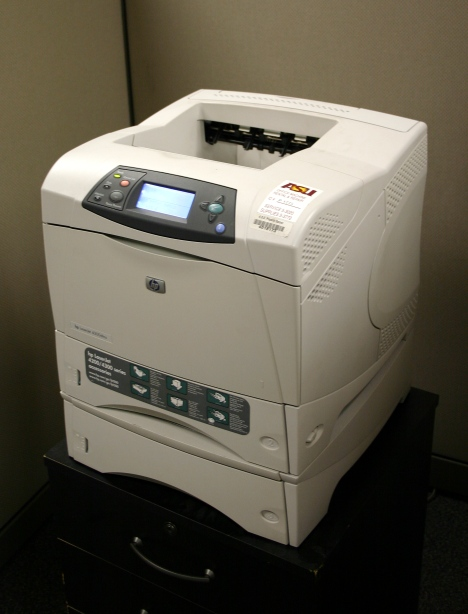
An HP LaserJet 4200dtns printer.

The HP LaserJet 4200 series were replacements for the HP LaserJet 4100 series of printers. They were introduced in December 2002 together with the HP LaserJet 4300 series. All models except the 4200 and 4200dtn were discontinued in June 2005, the latter being discontinued in November 2005.

The HP 4200 series of printers consists of the following

- 4200
- 4200n
- 4200tn
- 4200dtn
- 4200dtns
- 4200dtnsl.

The base model, the 4200, has the following specifications: 48 MB of memory, parallel port connection and a 600 sheet paper tray. All the others with factory-installed features as indicated above have 64 MB of memory.

They are all powered by a PMC-Sierra RM7065A CPU running at 300 MHz. This is a 64-bit processor based on the MIPS architecture. The printing engine is manufactured by Canon.

This series of printers can handle PCL, PostScript, HP-GL/2 and PJL print languages.

== LaserJet 4300 ==
The LaserJet 4300 series are a faster version of the LaserJet 4200n series of printers. The HP 4300 series of printers consists of the following

- 4300
- 4300n
- 4300tn
- 4300dtn
- 4300dtns
- 4300dtnsl.

The base model, the 4300, has the following specifications: 64MB of memory, parallel port connection and a 600 sheet paper tray. All the others with factory-installed features as indicated above have 80MB of memory.

They are all powered by a PMC-Sierra RM7065A CPU running at 350 MHz. This is a 64-bit processor based on the MIPS architecture.

This series can handle PCL, PostScript, HP-GL/2 and PJL print languages.

== Comparison ==
Comparison table of HP LaserJet 4000 models
Model	Introduction	Discontinued	CPU Speed	Print resolution (DPI)	Print speed (PPM)	Standard memory	Maximum memory
4000	November 1997	May 1999	100 MHz	1200	17	4 MB	100 MB
4050	May 1999	November 2001	133 MHz	1200	17	8 MB	192 MB
4100	March 2001	February 2003	250 MHz	1200	25	16 MB	256 MB
4200	November 2002	June/November 2005^{1}	300 MHz	1200	35	48 MB	416 MB
4240^{2}	December 2002	June 2005	460 MHz	1200	40	64 MB	512 MB
4250	November 2002	June/November 2005^{1}	460 MHz	1200	43	48 MB	512 MB
4300	December 2002	June 2005	350 MHz	1200	45	64 MB	416 MB
4350	November 2002	June 2005	460 MHz	1200	52	80 MB	512 MB

^{1} = 4200 and 4200dtn were discontinued in November 2005, all other models were discontinued in June 2005
^{2} = 4240 model is essentially identical to both the 4250 and 4350 models; firmware or microcode on formatter board and/or motor controller board is different so that the printer will not allow the use of "42X" (approx. 20,000 page capacity) toners; only lower capacity toners, such as the "42A" (approx. 10,000 pages) are permitted. Printing speed is specified as 3 pages/minute slower than the 4250.
