= HP Pavilion tx series =

Notebook computer

The HP Pavilion TX Series is a series of convertible notebook computers from Hewlett Packard introduced in February 2007. The Pavilion TX series has been superseded by the HP Touchsmart tx2 series, and subsequently by the HP Touchsmart tm2.

== TX1000 ==
These notebooks are designed for Windows Vista. The TX series uses the AMD Turion 64 X2 series of processors. This series has a 12.1-inch touch screen and a DVD+RW; it competed well with the top-of-the-line tablets at the time of its release. All models came with an NVIDIA GeForce Go 6150 graphics system, which features 128 MB of integrated graphics and an extra shared graphics memory of up to 916 MB.

=== Design ===
The series is delivered with the HP Imprint Finish. The form factor is referred to as a "convertible tablet", that is, the screen can be rotated to use the notebook as a slate with the included stylus. The current model has a glossy, black plastic casing and a perforated touchpad. The speakers are located near the hinge, on the screen; and the webcam on the top of the screen. The stereo microphones are also mounted on the screen and the tablet comes with an optional fingerprint reader. The standard 6-cell battery juts out to form a hand-grip and the DVD drive can be replaced with a plastic "weight-saver".

=== Specifications ===
- Processor: AMD Turion(TM) 64 X2 Dual-Core
- Screen:12.1″ WXGA BrightView LED back-lit [semi-glossy/matte] (1280×800) with passive touchscreen (without Wacom Penabled digitizer)
- Graphics:NVIDIA GeForce Go 6150
- Webcam + Dual Mic
- Fingerprint Reader (Optional)
- PC-5300 RAM 1GB [base config], 2GB, 3GB, 4GB
- SATA Hard Drive, 160GB [base config], 250GB, 320GB
- Removable LightScribe DVD+/-RW w/Double Layer
- Wireless: 802.11 a/b/g/draft n WLAN [base config]; Bluetooth 2.1 (optional)
  - Verizon Wireless V740 ExpressCard (requires data plan)
- Battery: Lithium Ion 6 Cell [base config]/ 4 Cell/ 8 Cell

=== Criticism ===
Within a few months of release of the tx1000 series, numerous technical failures were reported on internet blogs, review sites and HP's own support websites. These included webcam, audio, speaker, BIOS, power management, overheating, booting, and wireless adapter problems. Some were addressed in a timely manner with driver updates, but other users were still forced to turn the notebook on and off repeatedly until it booted up, while others were left with a non-working "bricked" unit. HP released an updated model, the HP Pavilion tx2, which in turn was followed by the HP TouchSmart tm2. HP never issued a recall for its tx1 model.

== TX2000 ==
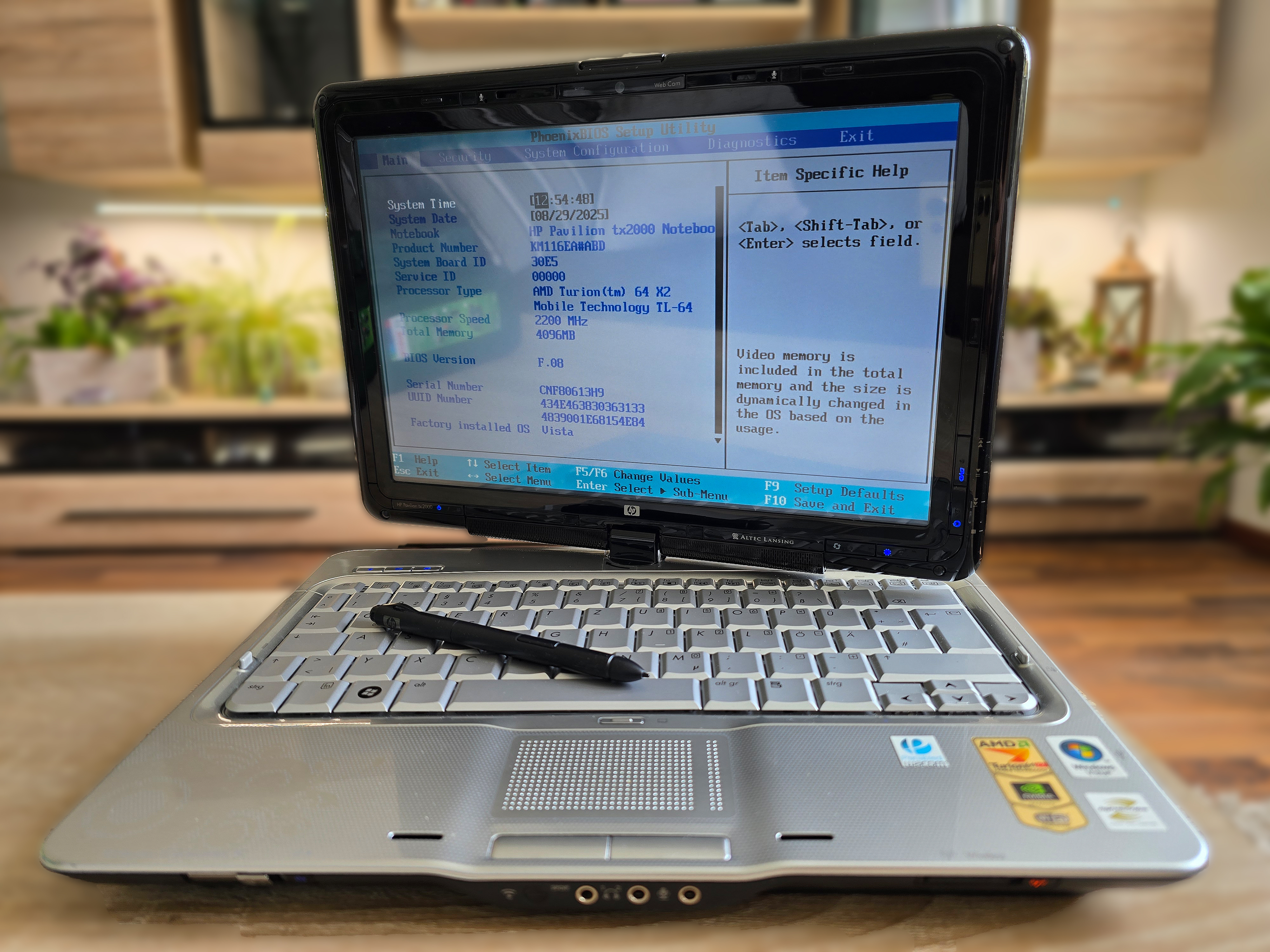
HP Pavilion tx2000 Convertible

The HP Pavilion tx2000 is largely similar to its predecessor, the tx1000, with the primary changes being a marginally faster processor and the introduction of an active stylus for the touchscreen display, replacing the previous model's passive pen. The active digitizer provides improved precision and control when using the stylus. At launch, the model was priced at US$1,299. The tx2000 was equipped with an AMD Turion 64 X2 processor; early units featured the TL-66 CPU, later replaced by the slightly faster TL-68. As with the tx1000, the tx2000 was reported to suffer from chipset flexing issues, which in some cases resulted in system failure or loss of Wi-Fi functionality, attributed to physical disconnection of chipset lanes.

== TX2500 ==
The HP Pavilion tx2500 introduced AMD's Puma platform and an updated ATI graphics chipset (instead of nVidia), the Radeon HD 3200, which improved 3D performance compared to its predecessor. The model typically featured an AMD Turion X2 Ultra dual-core Mobile ZM-86 processor at 2.40 GHz (slower and faster variants were available during its lifespan), a 12.1-inch WXGA (1280 × 800) HP BrightView touchscreen display with Wacom active input, 3 GB DDR2 RAM, and Windows Vista Business (32-bit). Connectivity included 802.11a/b/g/n wireless, Bluetooth, three USB 2.0 ports, ExpressCard/34 slot, Consumer IR, a 5-in-1 card reader, modem, and Ethernet. Additional features comprised an integrated microphone and webcam, fingerprint reader and 6-cell battery option. Due to its complete motherboard redesign, it was no longer plagued from flexing issues.
