= HP Photosmart =

Discontinued digital camera by Hewlett-Packard

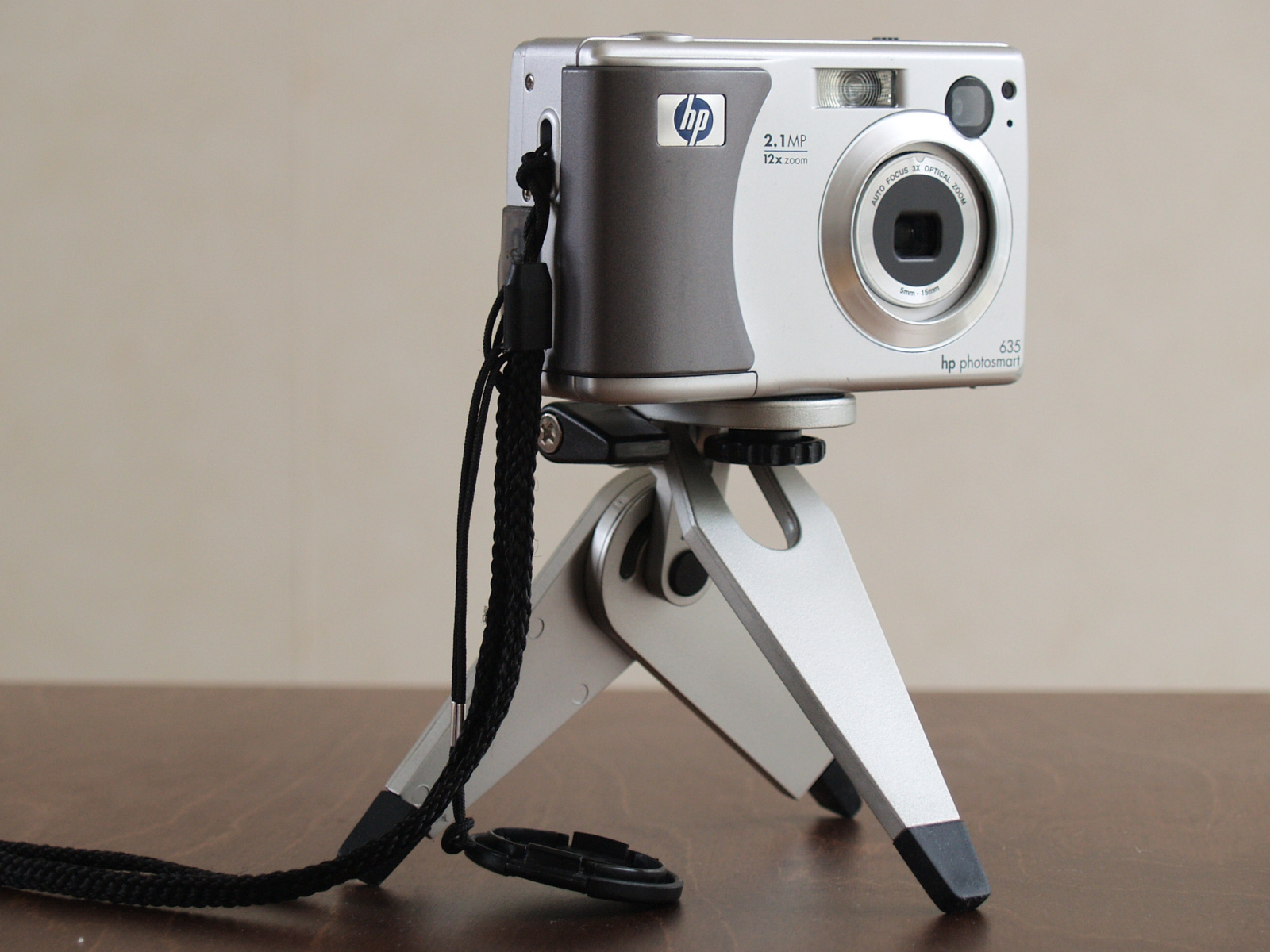
A HP Photosmart 635 (2.1 megapixel digital camera) mounted on a miniature tripod.

PhotoSmart is a discontinued line of digital cameras sold by Hewlett-Packard starting in 1997. HP has also sold a line of home photo printers under the same branding.

== Digital cameras ==
The original HP digital camera was an Intel Miniature Card-based model simply called the Photosmart. It was a VGA-resolution camera with a simple LCD. The company later broadened its line with a number of series of cameras, all using the Photosmart name.

HP announced on November 7, 2007, that it will seek an alternative business model for its HP-branded cameras and was working to identify an original equipment manufacturer (OEM) partner that would be licensed to design, source and distribute digital cameras under the HP brand.

== List of models ==
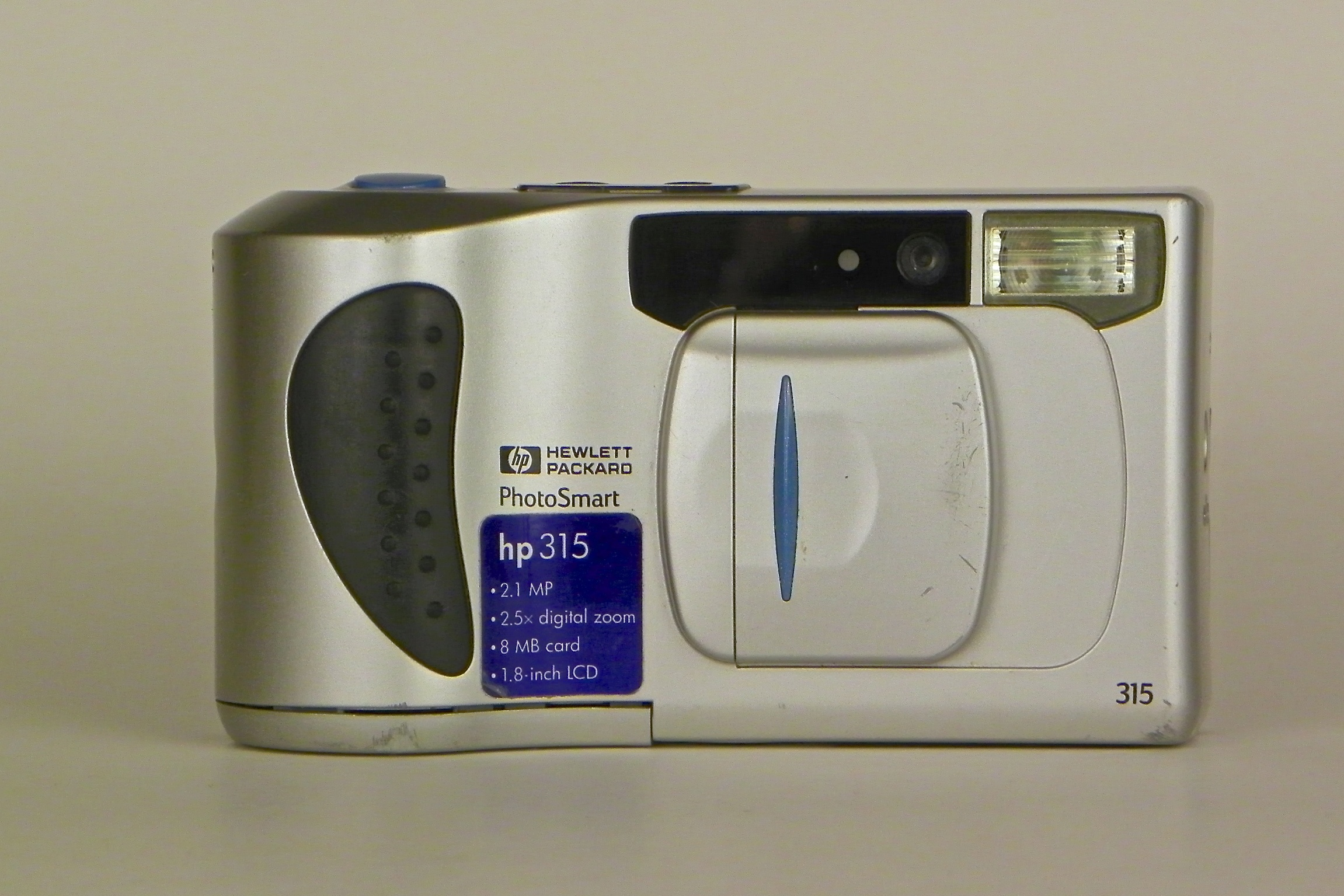
HP PhotoSmart 315

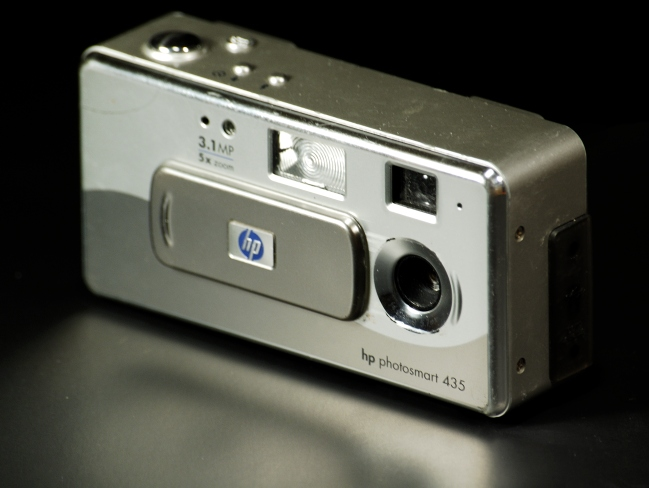
HP PhotoSmart 435

- HP PhotoSmart 215
- HP PhotoSmart 315
- HP PhotoSmart 318
- HP PhotoSmart 320
- HP Photosmart 335
- HP PhotoSmart 433
- HP PhotoSmart 435

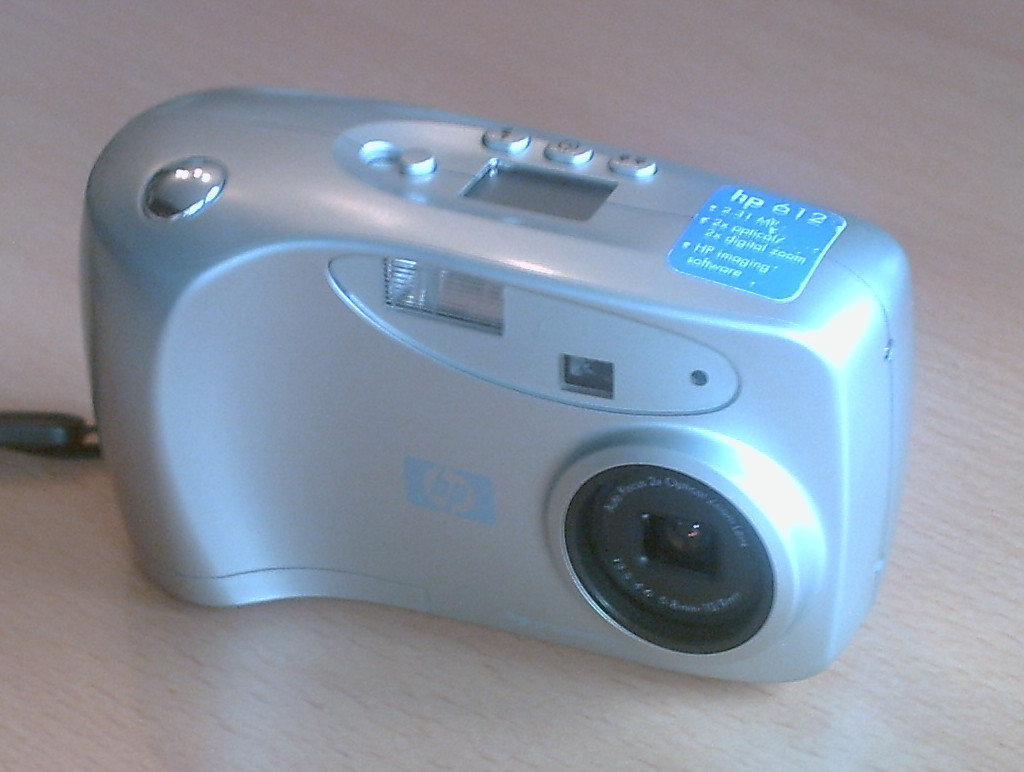
HP PhotoSmart 612

- HP PhotoSmart 612/612xi
- HP Photosmart 618/618xi
- HP PhotoSmart 620/620v
- HP PhotoSmart 635
- HP PhotoSmart 715
- HP PhotoSmart 720
- HP PhotoSmart 733
- HP PhotoSmart 735
- HP PhotoSmart 812/812xi
- HP PhotoSmart 850
- HP PhotoSmart 912/912xi
- HP PhotoSmart 935
- HP PhotoSmart 945 (also HP PhotoSmart C945 according to Exif data)
- HP Photosmart 970cxi
- HP Photosmart 1000
- HP Photosmart 3310
- HP PhotoSmart 7450
- HP Photosmart 7520
- HP Photosmart 7525

=== HP C series ===
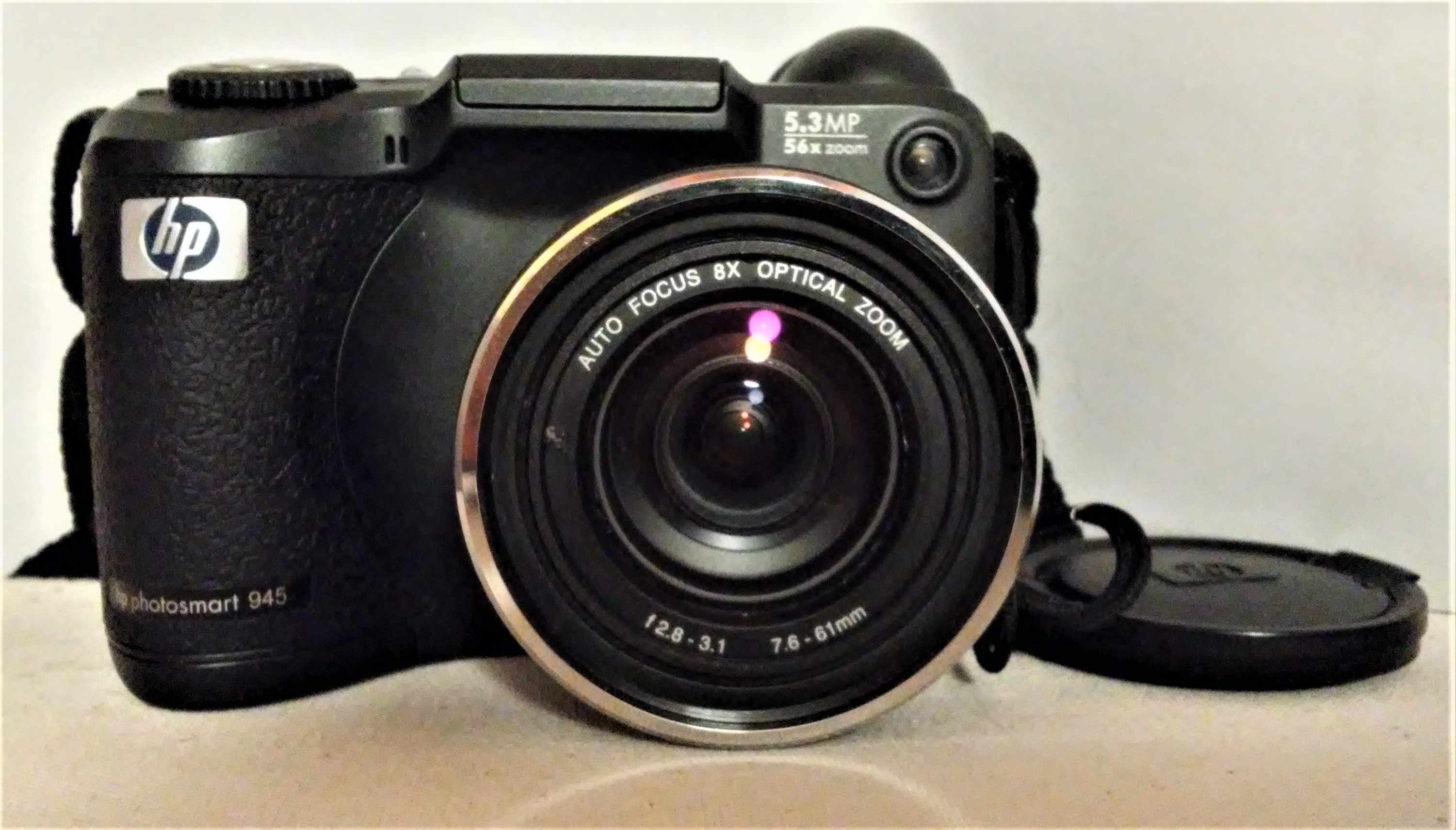
HP PhotoSmart C945 (V01.47)

- HP PhotoSmart (C5340A) – identical to Konica Q-EZ
- HP PhotoSmart C20 (C5384A) – identical to Konica Q-M100
- HP PhotoSmart C30 (C5386A) – identical to Konica Q-M100V
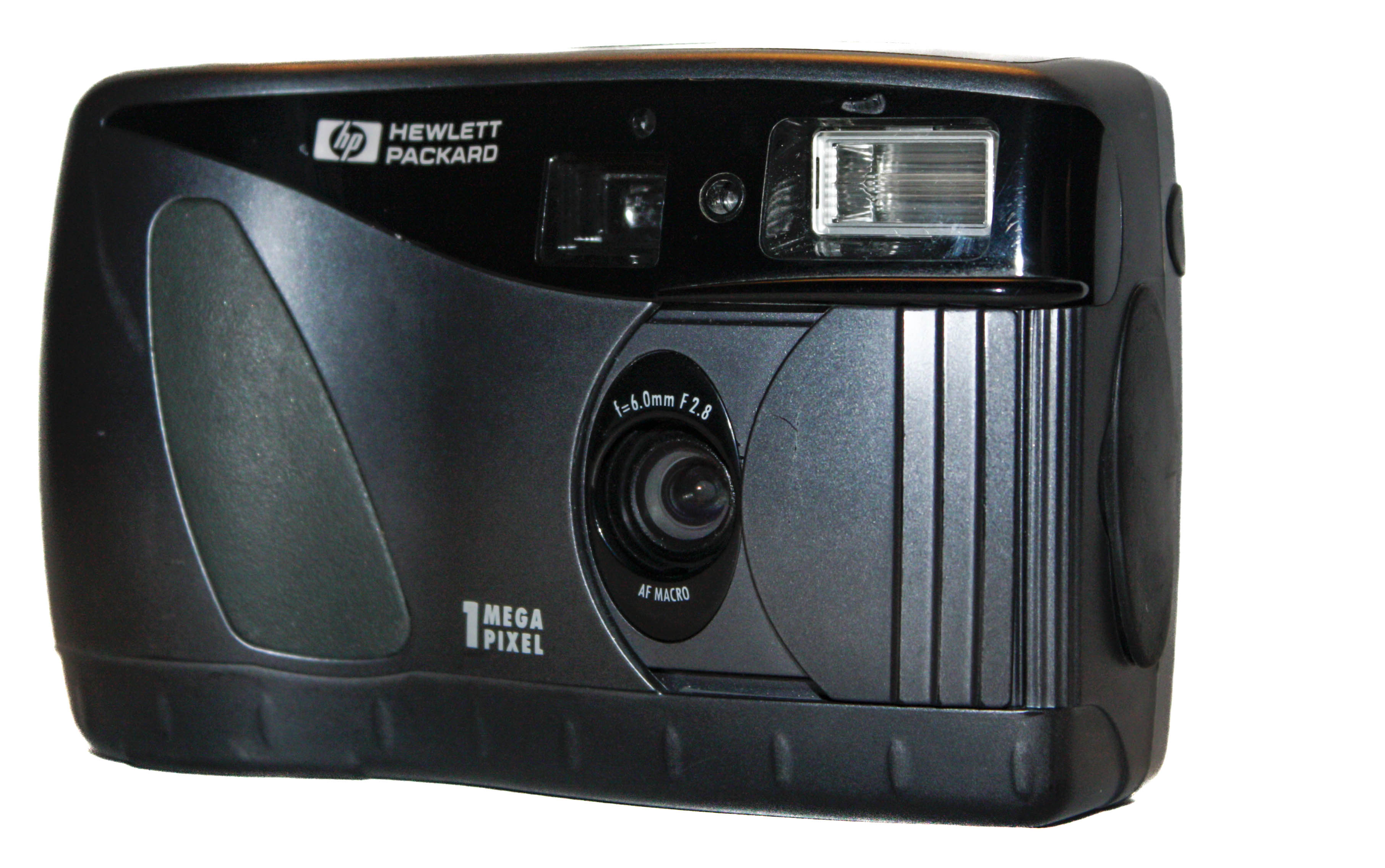
- Hewlett Packard HP Photosmart C200 1 Megapixel Digital Camera.
  HP PhotoSmart C200 (C7294A) – identical to Konica Q-M200
- HP PhotoSmart C20xi
- HP PhotoSmart C30xi
- HP PhotoSmart C4200
- HP PhotoSmart C4440
- HP PhotoSmart C4580
- HP PhotoSmart C500/C500xi
- HP PhotoSmart C5280
- HP PhotoSmart C618 — identical to Pentax EI-200

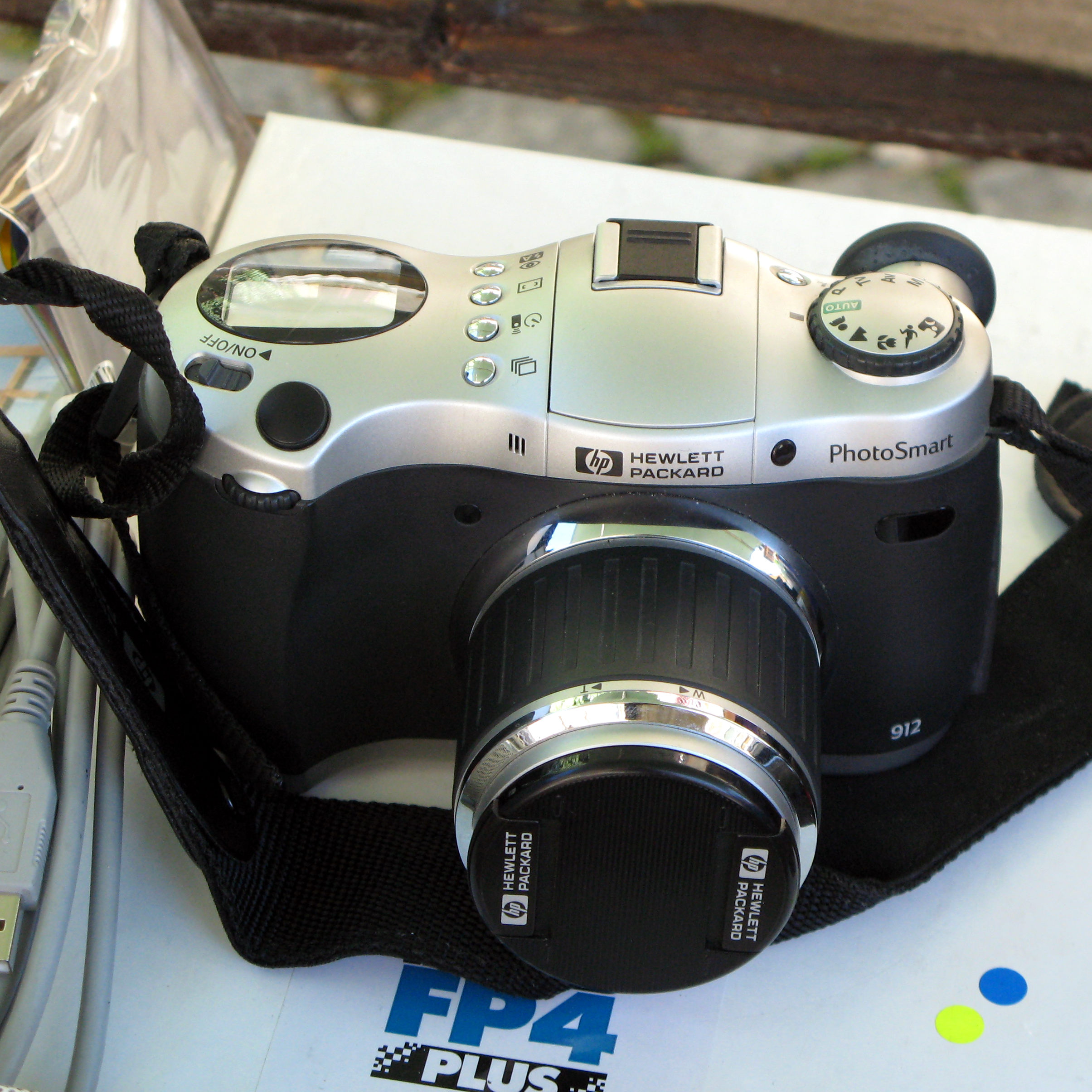
HP PhotoSmart C912

- HP PhotoSmart C912 — identical to Pentax EI-2000
- HP PhotoSmart C945 (V01.47)
- HP PhotoSmart C6380
- HP PhotoSmart C4480

=== HP E series ===
- HP Photosmart E217
- HP Photosmart E317
- HP Photosmart E327
- HP Photosmart E337
- HP Photosmart E427 and HP Photosmart M537: 6-megapixel digital cameras running on AA batteries and supporting the SD memory card technology.

=== HP M series ===
- HP Photosmart M22
- HP Photosmart M23
- HP Photosmart M305
- HP Photosmart M307

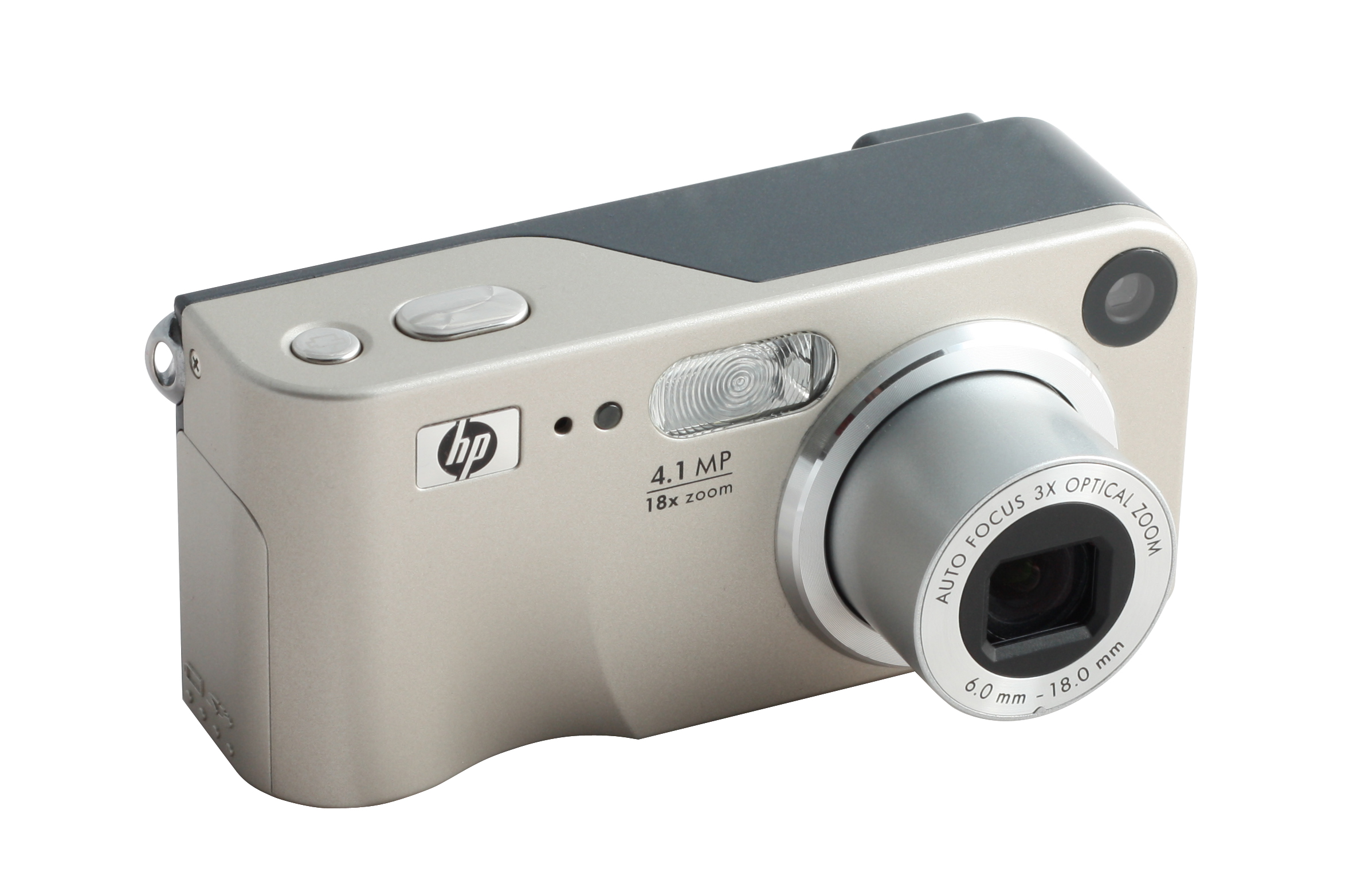
HP Photosmart M407

- HP Photosmart M407/M407xi (4.1 megapixel, SD card, two AA batteries)
- HP Photosmart M415
- HP Photosmart M417
- HP Photosmart M425 (introduced in 2006, 5 megapixels, MultiMediaCard and SD card)
- HP Photosmart M437
- HP Photosmart M447
- HP Photosmart M517
- HP Photosmart M525
- HP Photosmart M527
- HP Photosmart M537
- HP Photosmart M547
- HP Photosmart M627
- HP Photosmart M637
- HP Photosmart M737
- HP Photosmart Mz67

=== HP R series ===
The R series was HP's top line of cameras.

- HP Photosmart R507
- HP Photosmart R607

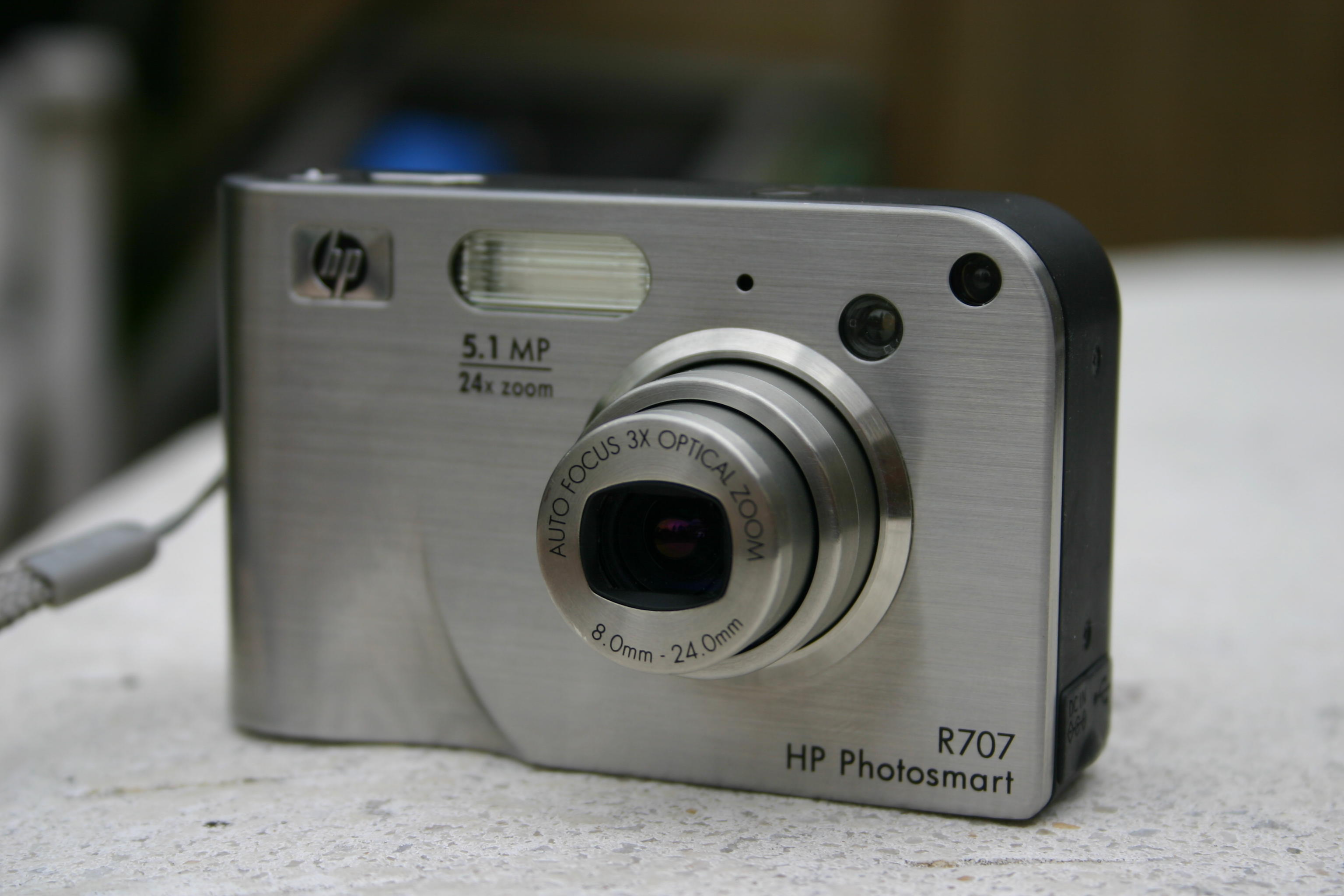
HP Photosmart R707

- HP Photosmart R707
- HP Photosmart R717
- HP Photosmart R725
- HP Photosmart R727
- HP Photosmart R742
- HP Photosmart R817

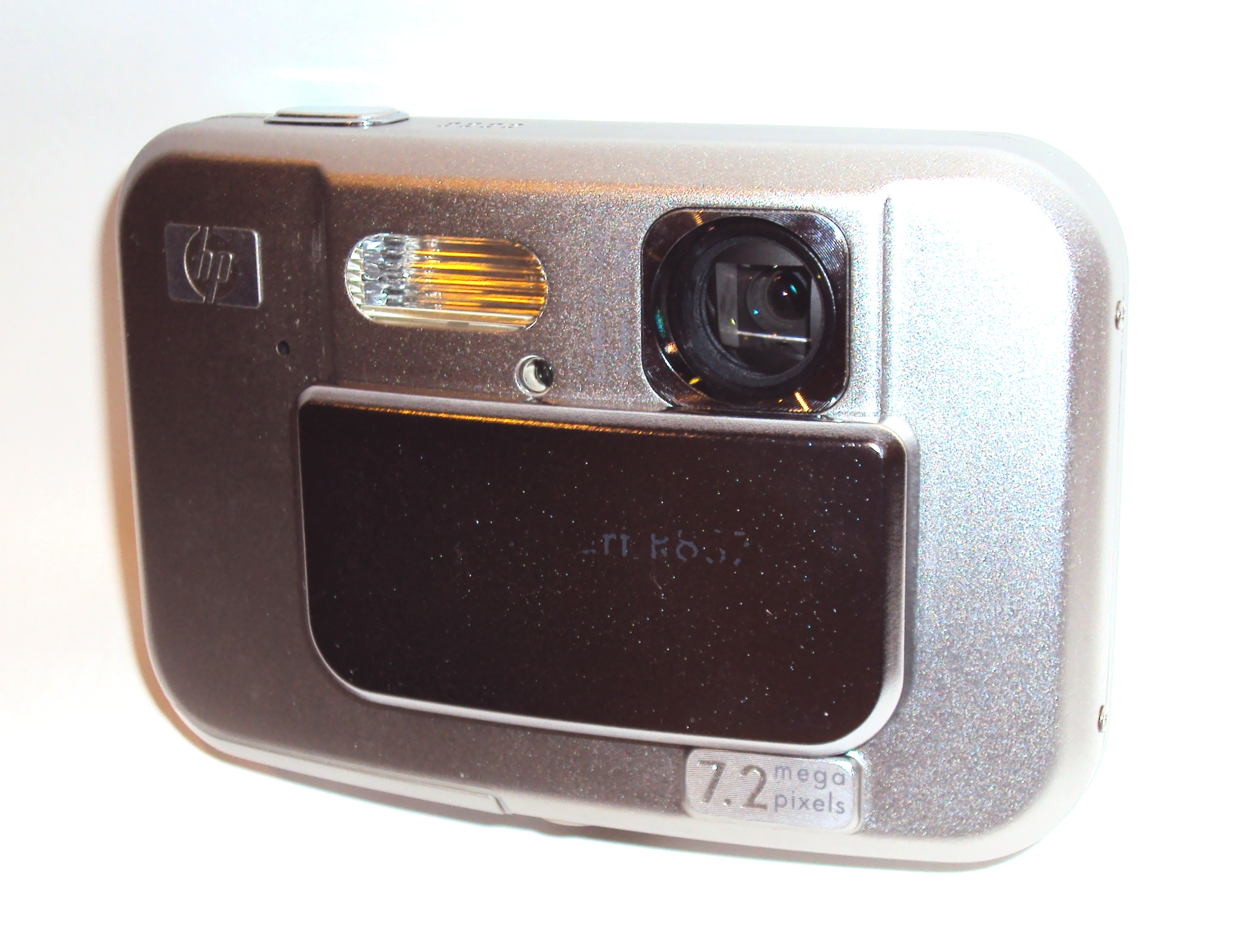
HP PhotoSmart R837

- HP Photosmart R818
- HP Photosmart R827
- HP Photosmart R837
- HP Photosmart R847
- HP Photosmart R927 (video capability with a VGA resolution of 640 × 480 at 24 frames per second)
- HP Photosmart R937
- HP Photosmart R967

=== Other HP cameras ===
- HP Photosmart 3210
- HP Photosmart 3310
- HP Photosmart 1400/1410

=== HP-branded cameras ===
- HP CA340
- HP CA350
- HP CB350
- HP CC330
- HP CC450
- HP CW450
- HP CW450t
- HP PB360t/PW360t
- HP PC460t
- HP PW460t
- HP PW550
- HP SB360
- HP SW350
- HP SW450
- HP c200
- HP c500
- HP s300 Black, Also known as Casio Exilim QV-R100, AIGO DC-F500, Haier S68
- HP s500 Black

== E-series ==
Series	Model	MP	Pixels	Screen	Type
E200	HP Photosmart E217	4.06	2332 × 1740	1.5"	ultracompact
E300	HP Photosmart E317	5	2560 × 1920	1.5"	ultracompact
E300	HP Photosmart E327	5.19	2654 × 1955	1.8"	ultracompact
E300	HP Photosmart E327v	5.19	2654 × 1955	1.8"	ultracompact

== See also ==
- List of Hewlett-Packard products - From 2006, some HP printers were named 'Photosmart'
