= HP PhotoSmart R607 =

HP Photosmart R607
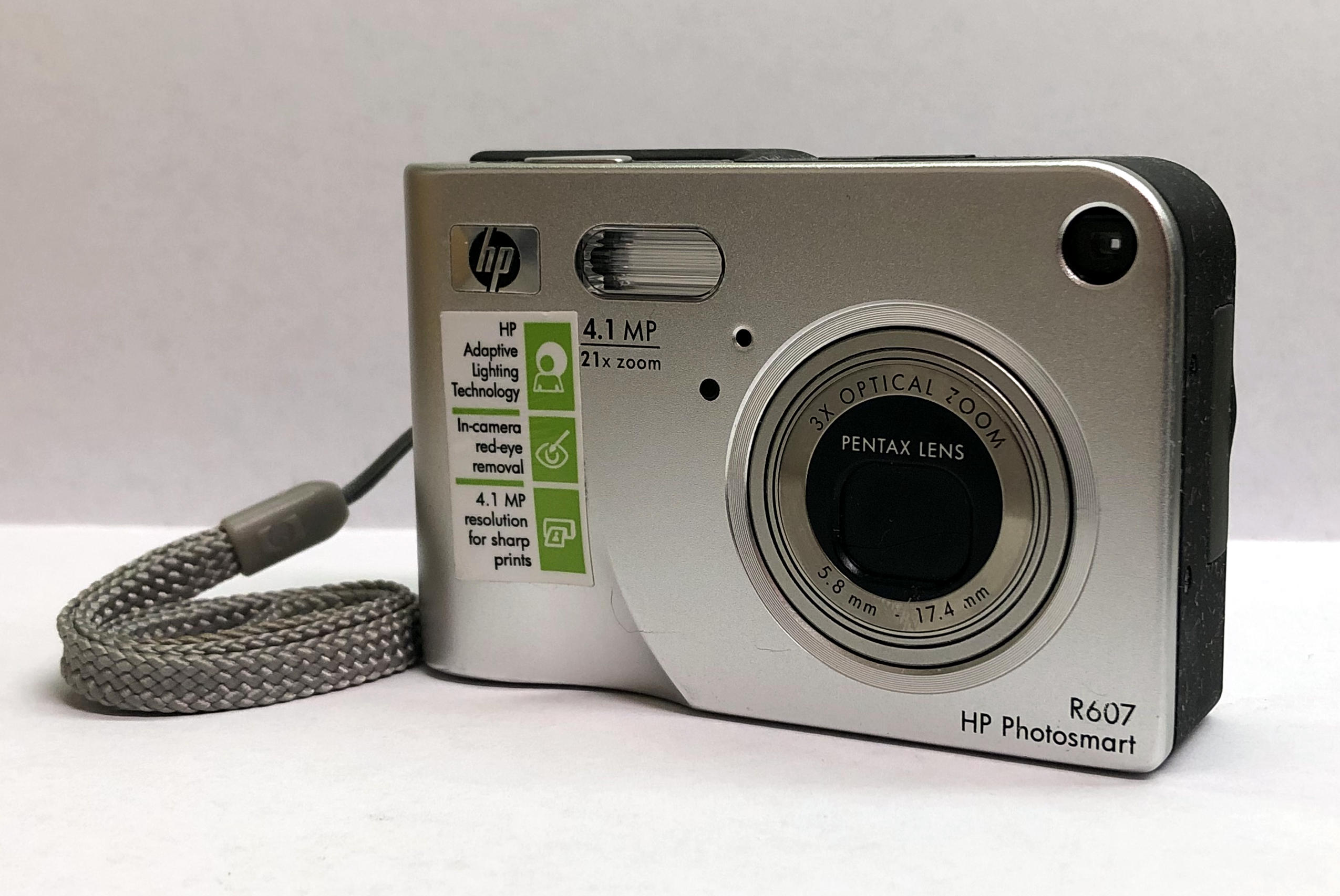
- HP PhotoSmart R607 4.1MP

Overview
- Maker: Hewlett-Packard
- Type: Ultra-compact digital camera

Lens
- Lens: Pentax lens; (3x optical zoom, 7x digital zoom), 5.8 mm - 17.4 mm focal length, approximately 35 to 105 mm (35 mm equivalent), f2.6 to f4.8 m

Sensor/medium
- Sensor: 1/2.5 inch CCD
- Maximum resolution: 4.1 megapixels
- Film speed: 100, 200, 400 (ISO equivalent)
- Storage media: SD/MMC

Shutter
- Shutter: 16 to 1/2000 sec

Viewfinder
- Viewfinder: none

General
- LCD screen: 1.5 in; 120,480 pixels
- Weight: 0.2 lbs

The R607 is a model of digital camera produced by Hewlett-Packard, under the Photosmart line of cameras and photo printers.

The R-series is HP's top line of digital cameras, positioned above the M-series and entry-level E-series.

Hewlett Packard R607 4.1MP Camera and Photography Illustrations
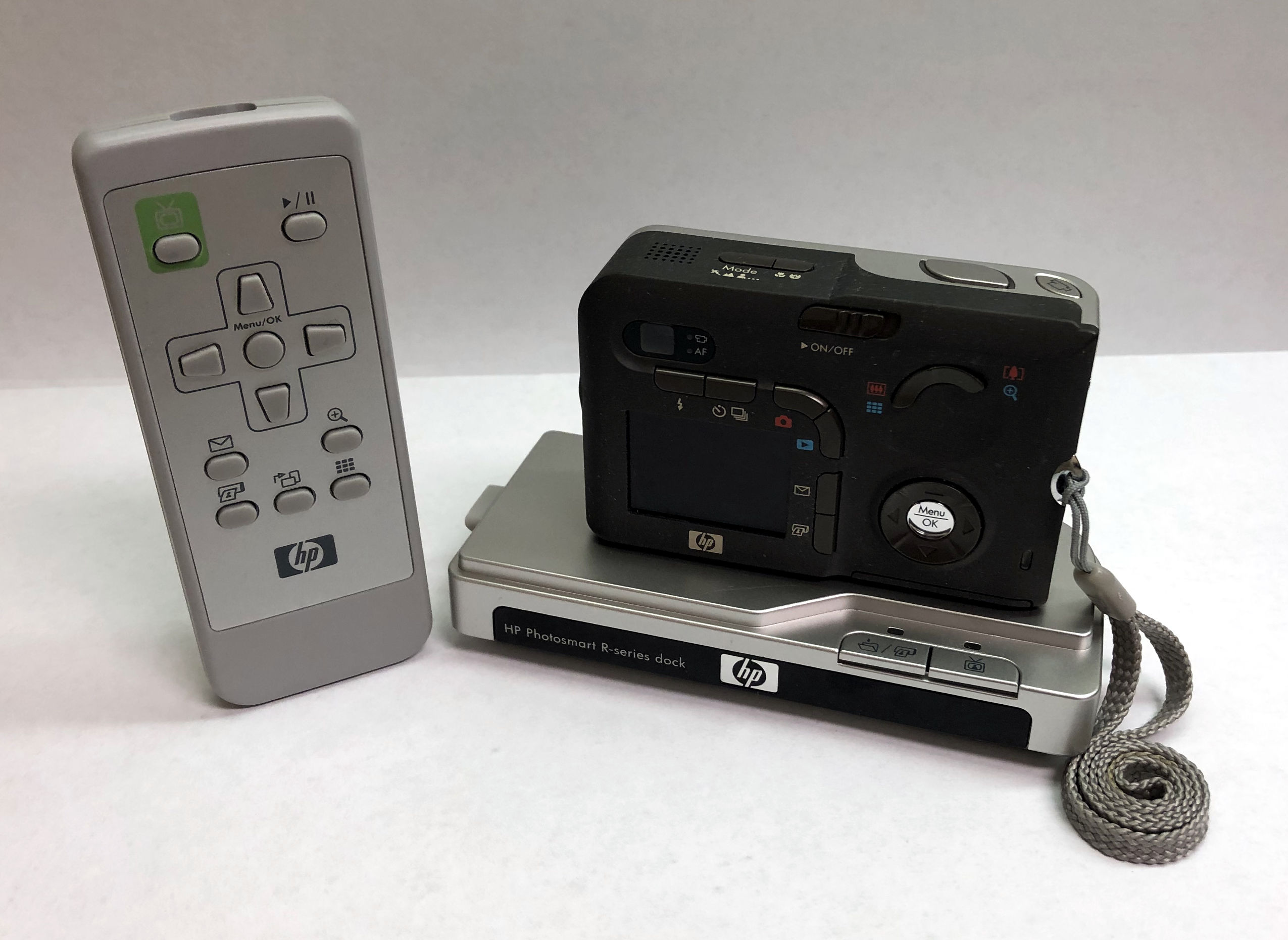
HP PhotoSmart R607 ultra-compact camera user interface

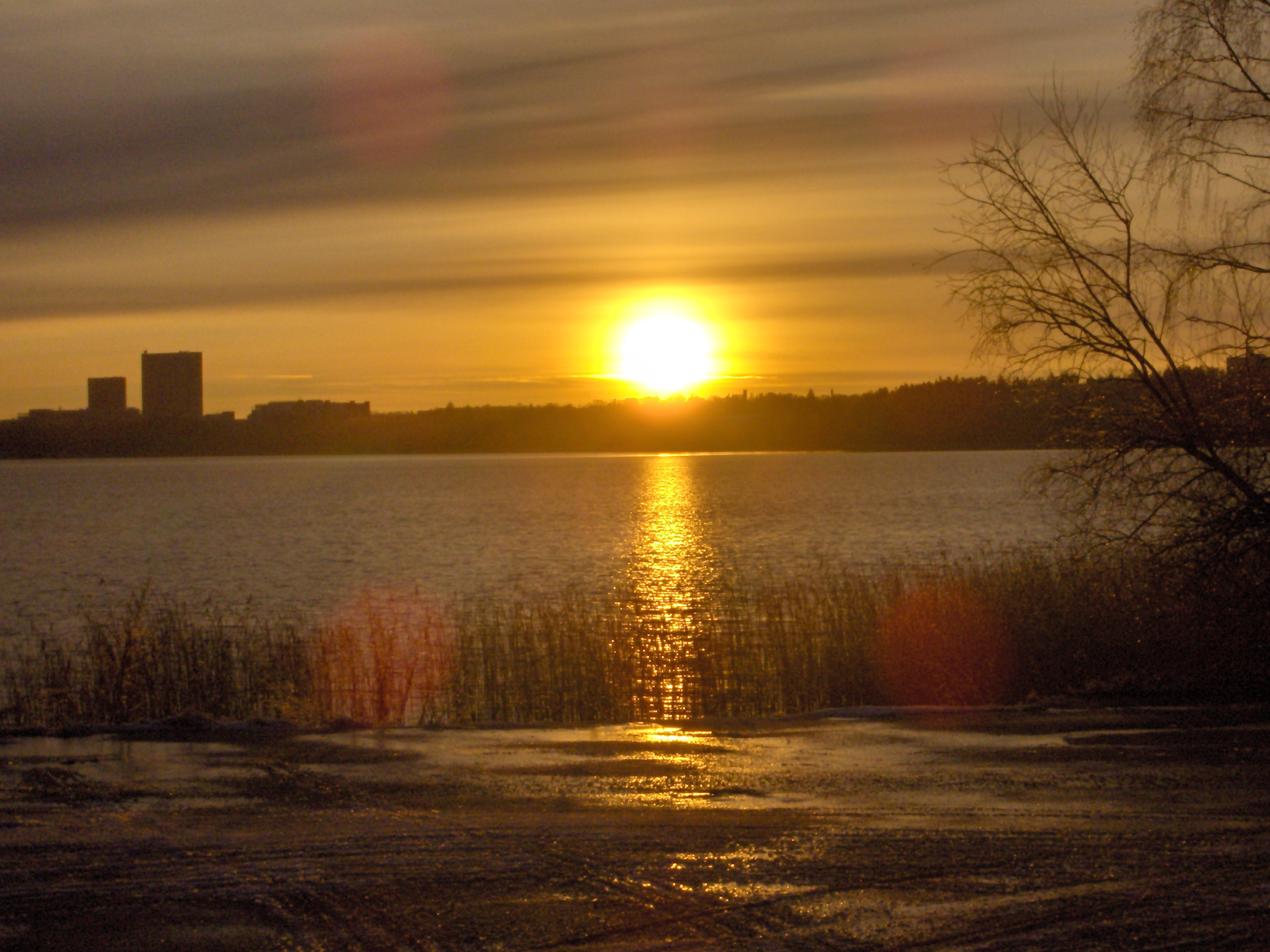
Photograph of vibrant gold and yellow colors.

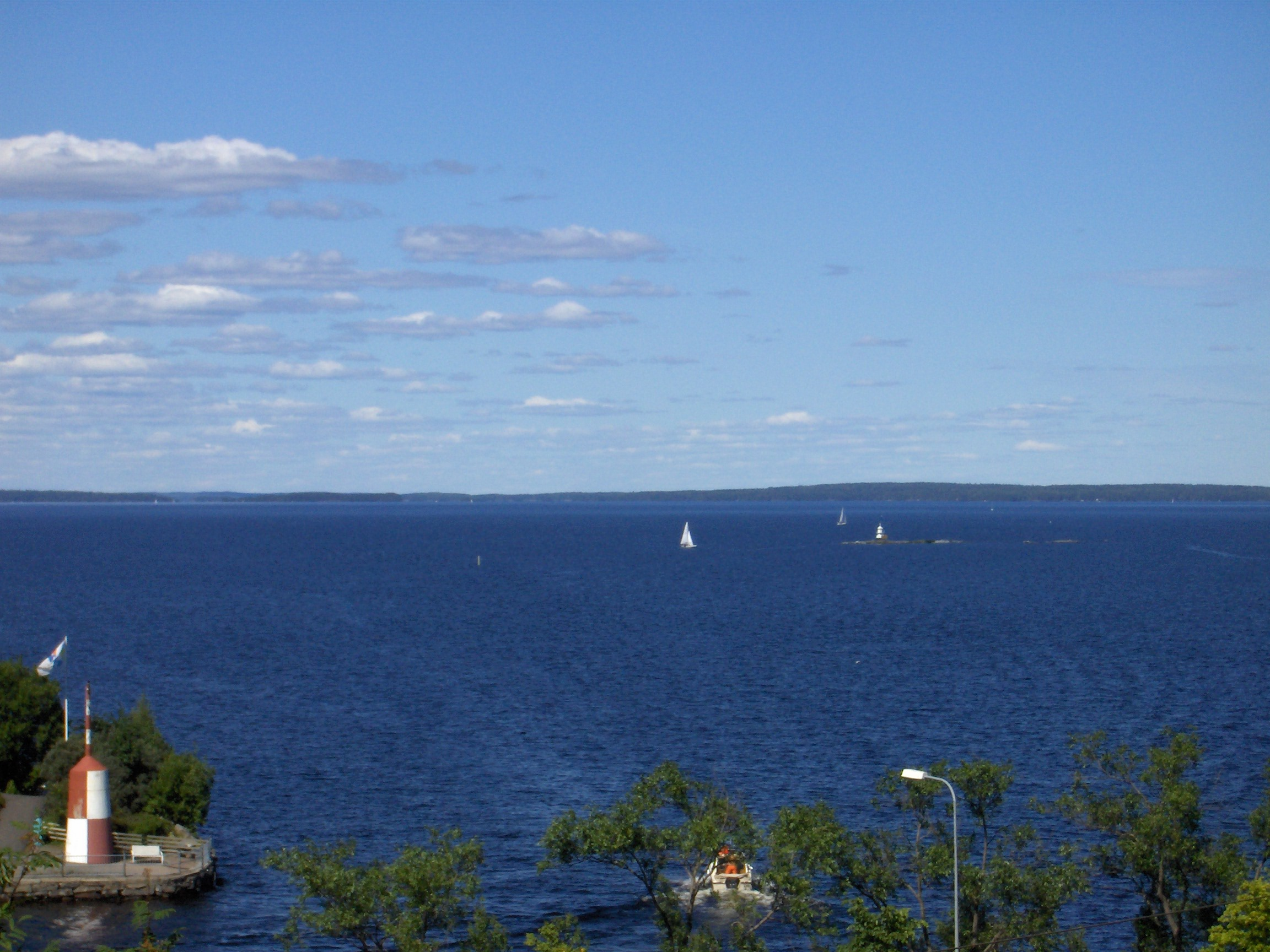
Inquisitive landscape with color depth variances.

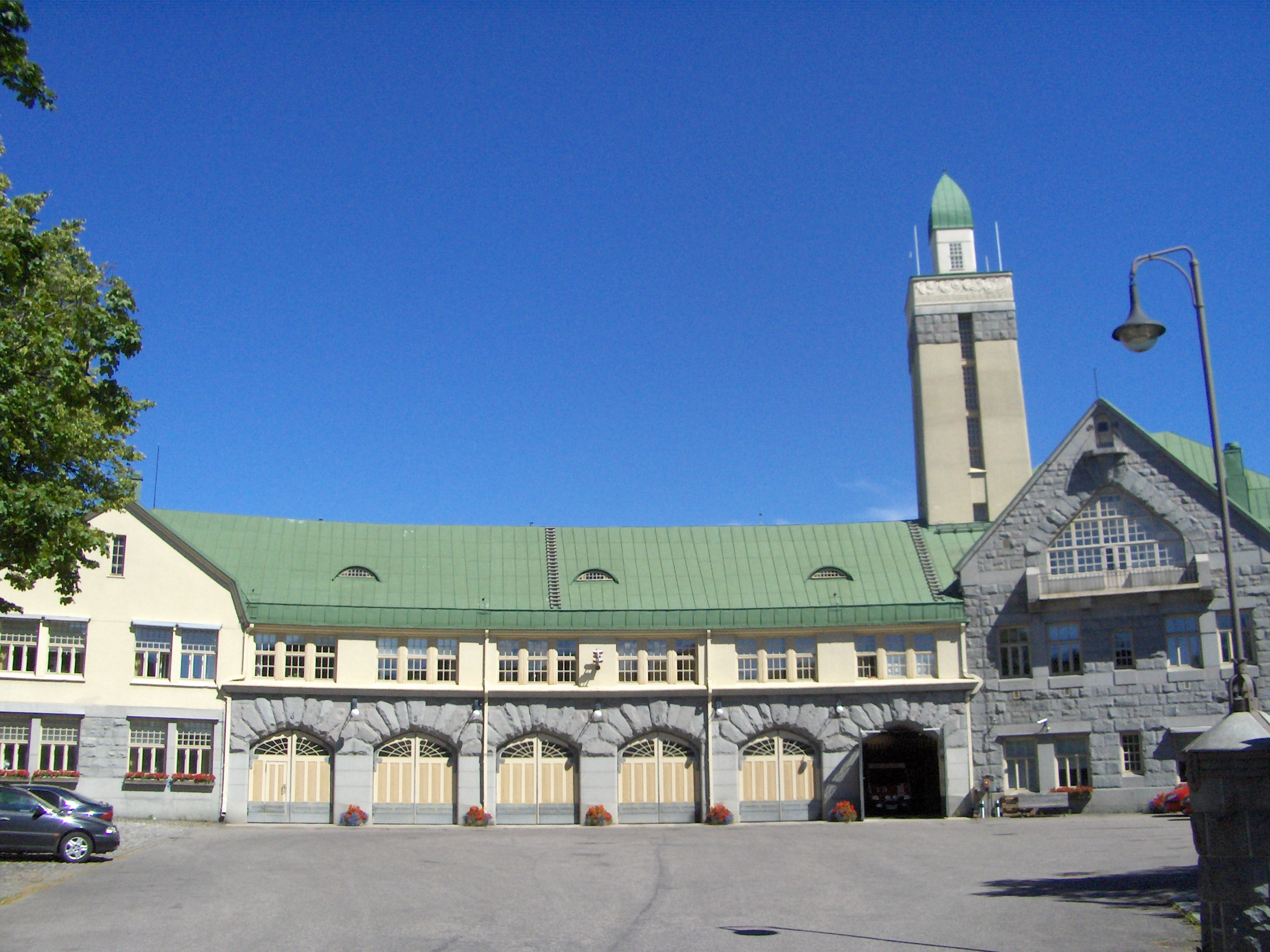
Photograph of mellow beige, gray, and green colors.
