= HP Photosmart M407 =

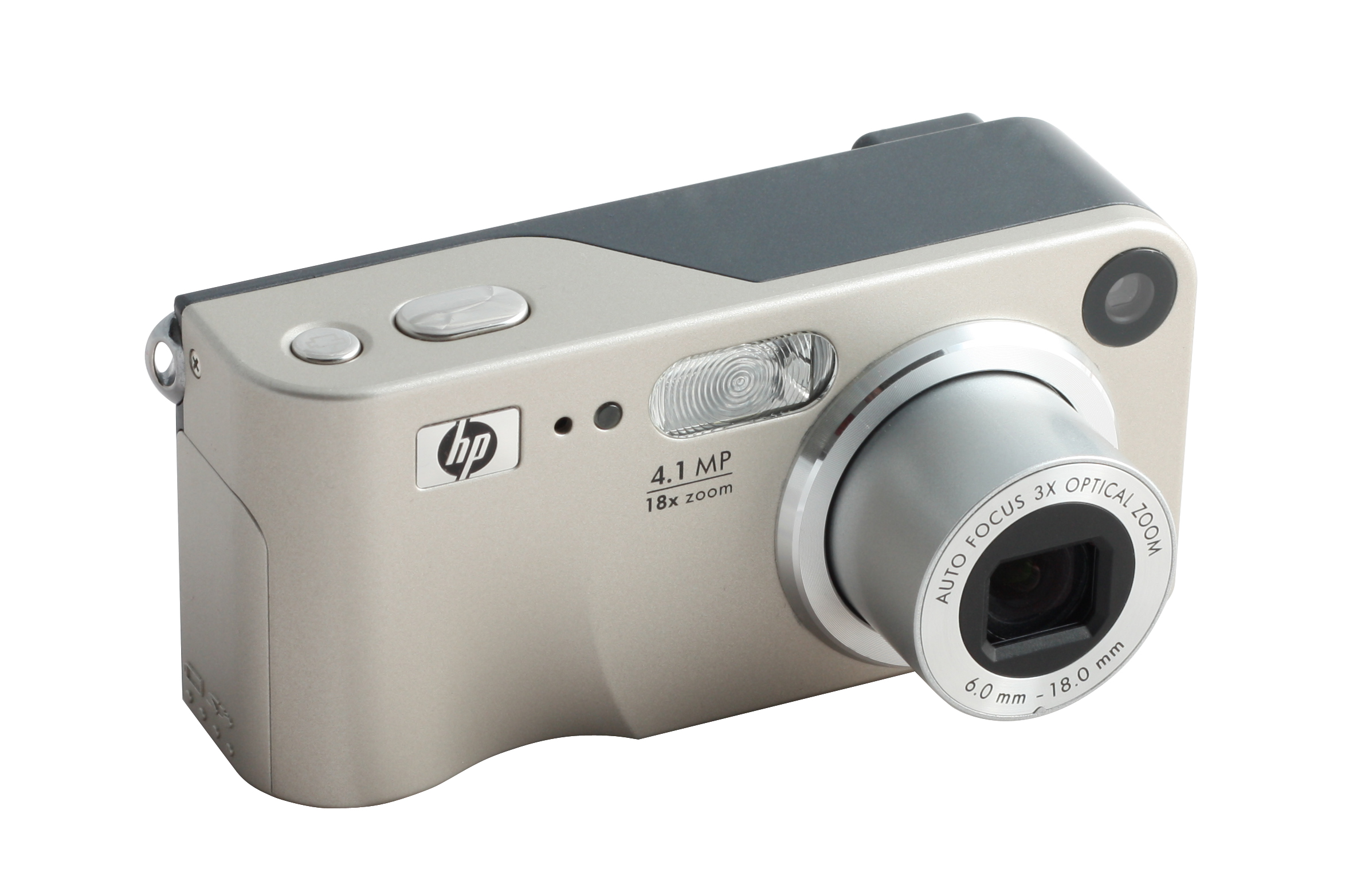
- HP Photosmart M407

Overview
- Maker: Hewlett Packard
- Type: Compact digital camera (point-and-shoot)

Lens
- Lens: Fixed lens: 6-18 mm (3× optical zoom, equivalent to 34-95 mm)
- F-numbers: f/2.8-f/4.8 to f/4.8-f/8

Sensor/medium
- Sensor type: CCD
- Sensor size: 1/2.5", 2396 × 1766 pixels
- Maximum resolution: 4.1 megapixels
- Recording medium: SD or MMC card
- Storage media: 16 MB

Focusing
- Focus: Autofocus (macro mode)
- Focus bracketing: No

Exposure/metering
- Exposure: Automatic
- Exposure modes: ±2EV compensation
- Exposure metering: 100-400 ISO

Flash
- Flash: Built-in
- Flash bracketing: No

Shutter
- Shutter: 0.9s lag
- Shutter speeds: 1/2000 to 2s

Viewfinder
- Viewfinder: Optical

Image processing
- White balance: Auto, Sun, Shade, Tungsten, Fluorescent
- WB bracketing: No

General
- LCD screen: 1.8", 130,338 pixels
- Battery: 2× AA batteries
- Data port: USB 2.0, dock port
- Dimensions: 107×53×36 mm (4.2×2.1×1.4 in)
- Weight: 146 g (5 oz) 172 g with batteries

The HP Photosmart M407 is a 4.1-megapixel entry-level digital camera which was launched on August 28, 2004. It uses SD Memory Card storage. It was designed as an easy-to-use device for beginners and sold at a relatively low price.

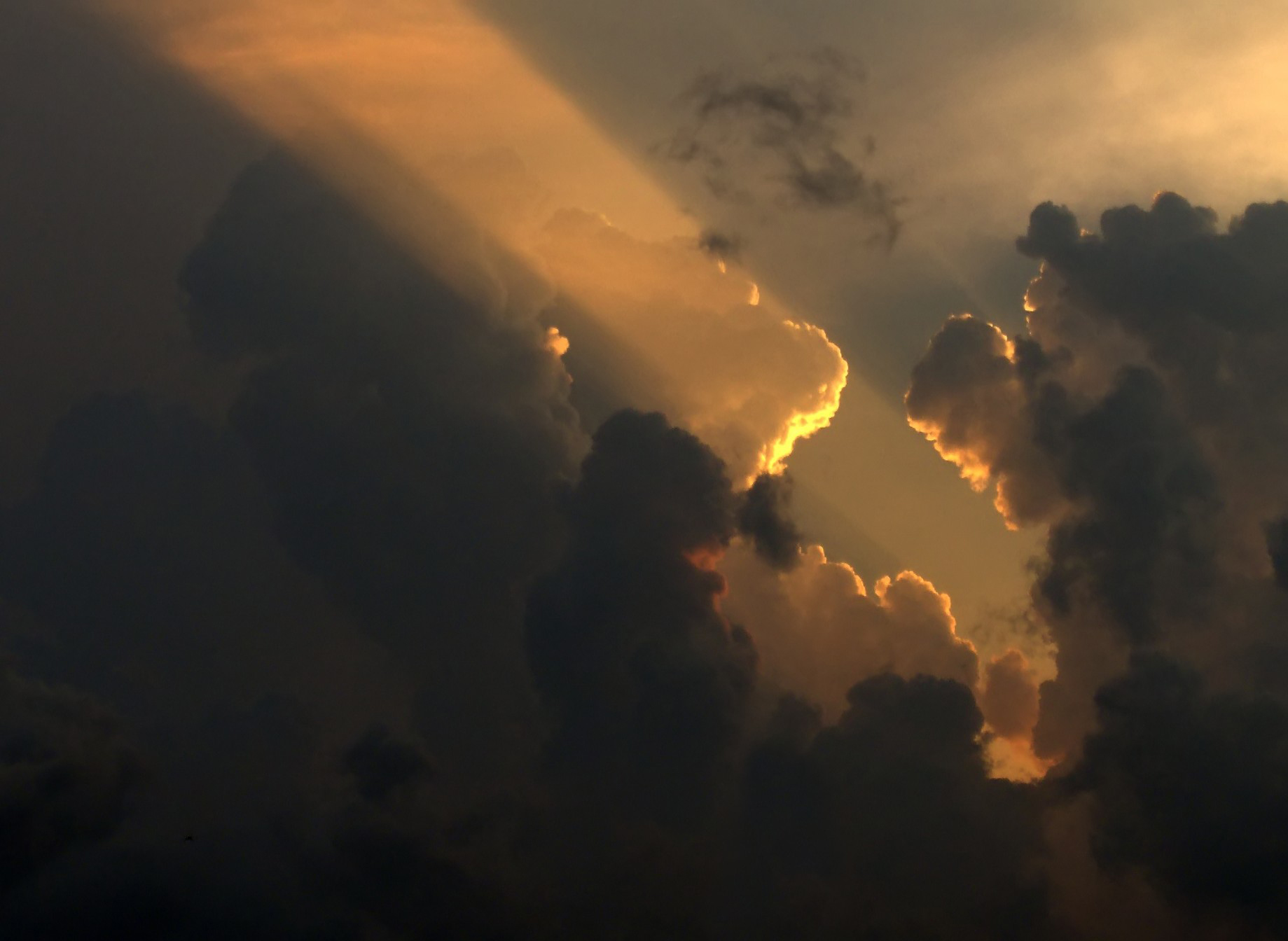
Picture of a sunset taken with an HP Photosmart M407
