= ThinkPad T series =

Series of laptops by IBM and Lenovo

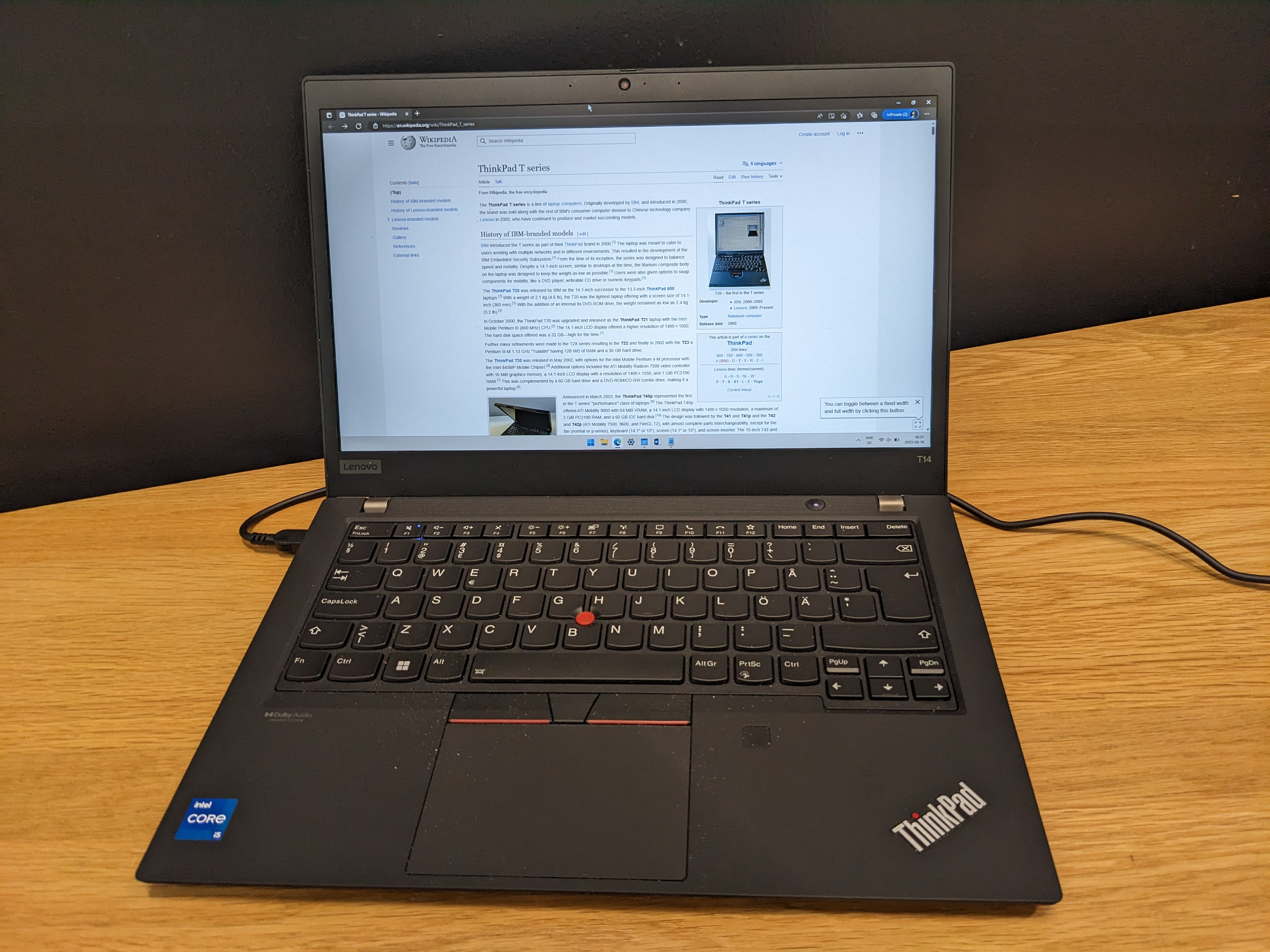
- 2021 Lenovo ThinkPad T14 Gen 2 Intel
- Developer: IBM (2000–2004); Lenovo (2005–present)
- Product family: ThinkPad
- Type: Notebook computer
- Released: May 2000; 26 years ago
- Operating system: Microsoft Windows, Linux
- CPU: Intel Core, AMD Ryzen PRO
- Predecessor: IBM ThinkPad 600; IBM ThinkPad 770
- Website: lenovo.com/us/en/c/laptops/thinkpad/thinkpadt/

The T series of flagship laptops are part of Lenovo's ThinkPad product line, offering high-performance computers aimed at businesses and professionals, originally introduced in 2000. Formerly an IBM brand, the series was produced by IBM until Lenovo acquired the ThinkPad brand following its purchase of IBM's Personal Computing Division (PCD) in 2005.

== History of IBM-branded models ==
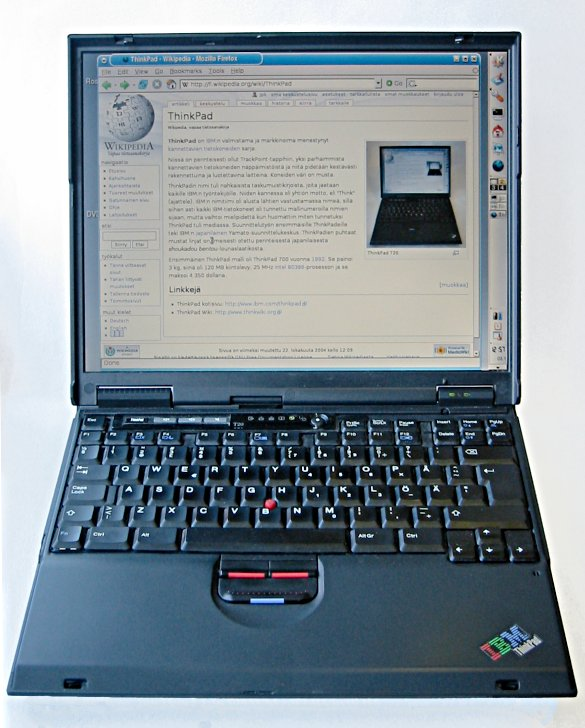
T20 – the first in the T series

IBM introduced the T series as part of their ThinkPad brand in May 2000, succeeding the high-end ThinkPad 600 and 700 series. The laptop was meant to cater to users working with multiple networks and in different environments. This resulted in the development of the IBM Embedded Security Subsystem.

From its inception, the series was designed to balance speed and mobility. Despite a 14.1-inch screen, similar to desktops at the time, the titanium composite body on the laptop was designed to keep the weight as low as possible. Users were also given options to swap components for mobility, like a DVD player, writeable CD drive or numeric keypads.

The ThinkPad T20 was released by IBM as the successor to the ThinkPad 600X and ThinkPad 770Z series laptops. With a weight of 2.1 kg (4.6 lb), the T20 was the lightest laptop offering with a screen size of 14.1-inch (360 mm). With the addition of an internal 8x DVD-ROM drive, the weight remained as low as 2.4 kg (5.2 lb).

In October 2000, the ThinkPad T20 was upgraded and released as the ThinkPad T21 laptop with the Intel Mobile Pentium III (800 MHz) CPU. The 14.1-inch liquid-crystal display (LCD) offered a higher resolution of 1400 × 1050. The hard disk space offered was a 32 GB—high for the time.

Further minor refinements were made to the T2X series resulting in the T22 and finally in 2002 with the T23 a Pentium III-M 1.13 GHz "Tualatin" having 128 MiB of RAM and a 30 GB hard drive.

The ThinkPad T30 was released in May 2002, with options for the Intel Mobile Pentium 4-M processor with the Intel 845 MP Mobile Chipset. Additional options included the ATI Mobility Radeon 7500 video controller with 16 MiB graphics memory, a 14.1-inch LCD with a resolution of 1400 × 1050, and 1 GiB PC2100 RAM. This was complemented by a 60 GB hard drive and a DVD-ROM/CD-RW combo drive, making it a powerful laptop.

Announced in March 2003, the ThinkPad T40p represented the first in the T series' "performance" class of laptops. The ThinkPad T40p offered a Pentium M clocked at 1.3, 1.5, or 1.6 GHz, ATI Mobility Radeon 9000 with 64 MiB VRAM, a 14.1-inch LCD with 1400 × 1050 resolution, a maximum of 2 GiB PC2100 RAM, and a 60 GB IDE hard disk. The design was followed by the T41 and T41p and the T42 and T42p (ATI Mobility Radeon 7500, 9600, and Mobility FireGL T2), with almost complete parts interchangeability, except for the fan (normal or p-series), keyboard (14.1" or 15"), screen (14.1" or 15"), and screen inverter. The 15-inch T42 and T42p models were offered with an optional 1400 × 1050 or 1600 × 1200 "FlexView" IPS LCD.

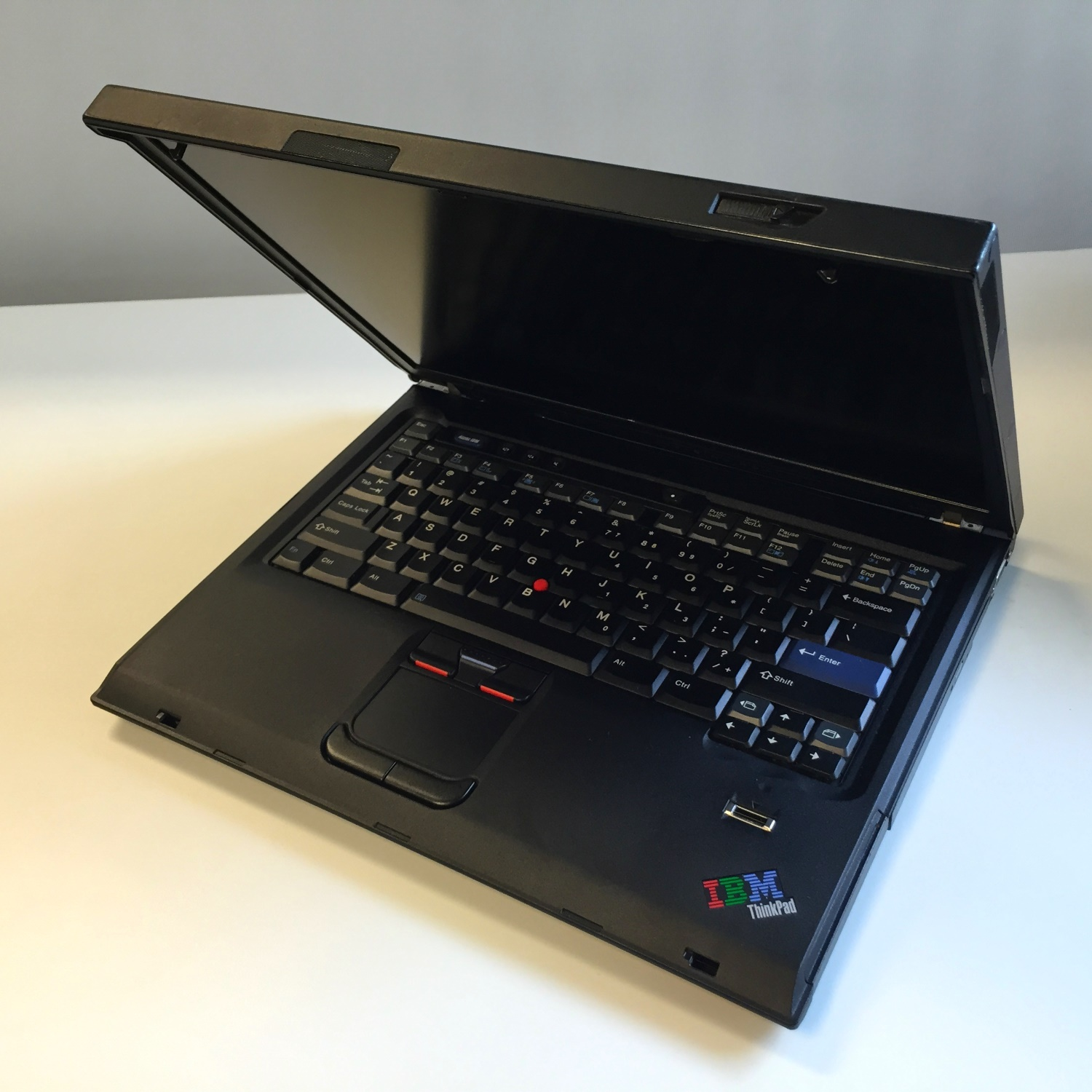
The last ThinkPad to have been manufactured directly by IBM (T43).

Launched in April 2004, the ThinkPad T43 and T43p laptops were the last T-series laptops manufactured by IBM. The major improvement was a move to lower-cost DDR2 RAM and a bus speed increase from 400 MT/s to 533 MT/s. Their Pentium M Dothan features the XD bit, making it the first ThinkPad that could run Windows 8.

In December 2004, Lenovo announced the acquisition of the IBM PC division including the ThinkPad brand. At the time, 40% of the PC division was working in China, and ThinkPads were being made by Lenovo's arch-rival Great Wall Technology.

IBM ThinkPad T series (2000–2004)
| Case type | Screen | Type | T2* | | | | T3* | T4* | | | | T6* | |
4:3 screens
| 14.1" | 13.3" | Mainstream | T20 | T21 | T22 | T23 | merged with 14" line | | | | | | |
| 14.1" | 14.1" | Mainstream | T20 | T21 | T22 | T23 | T30 | T40 | T41 | T42 | T43 | T60 | T61/T61u |
| 14.1" | 14.1" | Performance | | | | | | T40p | T41p | T42p | T43p | T60p | T61p |
| 15" | | Mainstream | | | | | | | | T42 | T43 | T60 | 4:3 options removed |
| 15" | | Performance | | | | | | | | T42p | T43p | T60p | 4:3 options removed |
16:10 screens
| 14.1" | | Mainstream | | | | | | | | | | T60 | T61 |
| 14.1" | | Performance | | | | | | | | | | T60p | T61p |
| 15.4" | | Mainstream | | | | | | | | | | T60 | T61 |
| 15.4" | | Performance | | | | | | | | | | T60p | T61p |

== History of Lenovo-branded models ==
Lenovo released the ThinkPad T60 and T60p laptops in February 2006. While designed and manufactured by Lenovo, the T60 and the T60p still featured the IBM logo on the machines. In May 2007, the T61 and T61p laptops slowly phased out IBM logos in favor of the ThinkPad logo. It also was the first T series model to adopt widescreen resolution as a mainstream option; the traditional 4:3 aspect ratio screens was also offered as an alternative at the time but mass industry adoption of the widescreen standard meant that it was the last ThinkPad of its kind to use the 4:3 standard.

The naming convention for the T series was changed by Lenovo following the release of the ThinkPad T400, T400s, and T500 in July 2008. The Txxp models (like the T61p) were replaced by the W series. Designed as mobile workstations, the W series grew to become Lenovo's line of performance-oriented laptops. The T series remains Lenovo's premier line of laptops, aimed at corporate and enterprise users and is praised by users for its outstanding Linux compatibility. The T-p lineup later returned as an irregular T##0p line with only T440p, T460p, T470p and T540p models. They were replaced by the P series.

Lenovo ThinkPad T series (2005–2025)
| Screen | Type | T*0* (2008) | T*1* (2010) | T*2* (2011) | T*3* (2012) | | T*4* (2013) | T*5* (2015) | T*6* (2016) | T*7* (2017) | | T*8* (2018) | | T*9* (2019) | | 2020 | 2021 | 2022 | 2023 | 2024 | | | 2025 | | |
| Screen | Type | Intel | Intel | Intel | Intel | | Intel | Intel | Intel | Intel | AMD | Intel | AMD | Intel | AMD | 2020 | 2021 | 2022 | 2023 | Intel | AMD | Qualcomm | Intel | AMD | Qualcomm |
|---|---|---|---|---|---|---|---|---|---|---|---|---|---|---|---|---|---|---|---|---|---|---|---|---|---|
| 14.1" | Ultrabook | | | | T430u | | replaced by T431s and X1 Carbon | | | | | | | | | | | | | | | | | | |
| 14.1" | Low-cost slim | T400si | T410si | T420si | T430si | | | | | | | | | | | | | | | | | | | | |
| 14.1" | Low-cost | T400i | T410i | T420i | T430i | | | | | | | | | | | | | | | | | | | | |
| 14.1" | Slim | T400s | T410s | T420s | T430s | T431s | T440s | T450s | T460s | T470s | | T480s | | T490s | T495s | T14s; Gen1 | T14s; Gen2 | T14s; Gen3 | T14s; Gen4 | T14s; Gen5 | T14s; Gen6 | | T14s; Gen6 | TBD | TBD |
| 14.1" | Mainstream | T400 | T410 | T420 | T430 | | T440 | T450 | T460 | T470 | A475 | T480 | A485 | T490 | T495 | T14; Gen1 | T14; Gen2 | T14; Gen3 | T14; Gen4 | T14; Gen5 | | | T14; Gen6 | T14; Gen6 | |
| 14.1" | Performance | | | | | | T440p | | T460p | T470p | | | | | | | | | | | | | | | |
| 15.6" | Low-cost | T500i | T510i | T520i | T530i | | | | | | | | | | | | | | | | | | | | |
| 15.6" | Mainstream | T500 | T510 | T520 | T530 | | replaced by T540p | T550 | T560 | T570 | | T580 | | T590 | | T15; Gen1 | T15; Gen2 | replaced by T16 | | | | | | | |
| 15.6" | Performance | | | | | | T540p | replaced by W541 and T550 | | | | | | | | T15p; Gen1 | T15p; Gen2 | T15p; Gen3 | replaced by P16v | | | | | | |
| 15.6" | Advanced graphics | | | | | | | | | | | | | | | T15g; Gen1 | T15g; Gen2 | replaced by P16 | | | | | | | |
| 16" | Mainstream | | | | | | | | | | | | | | | | | T16; Gen1 | T16; Gen2 | T16; Gen3 | | | T16; Gen4 | | |
| Suffixes to denote: u - Ultrabook; i - Low-cost; s - Slim; p - Performance; g - Advanced graphics | | Models prior to 2020 uses this convention: The first number after the letter T is the screen size in inch without the number 1 (i.e. T5xx for 15" models). The second number is the generation. Intel-based models have the last number being 0 or 1 while AMD-based models have the number being 5 or 6. Models whose last number is 1 or 6 are refreshes of their variants with the last number being 0 or 5. | | | | | | | | | | | | | | | | | | | | | | | |
Docking stations compatibility
| Essential Port Replicator; Advanced Dock; Advanced Mini Dock | | All | | | | | | | | | | | | | | | | | | | | | | | |
| USB Port Replicator with Digital Video | | All | | | | | | | | | | | | | | | | | | | | | | | |
| Port Replicator Series 3; Mini Dock Series 3; Mini Dock Plus Series 3 (90/135/170 W) | | All; CS09 04X0856 adapter required for T431s | | | | | | | | | | | | | | | | | | | | | | | |
| USB 3.0 Basic Dock; USB 3.0 Pro Dock; USB 3.0 Ultra Dock | | | | | | | | All | | | | | | | | | | | | | | | | | |
| Basic Dock; Pro Dock; Ultra Dock (90/135/170 W) | | | | | | | All except some models with discrete graphics | | | | | | | | | | | | | | | | | | |
| USB-C Dock | | | | | | | | | | All | | | | | | | | | | | | | | | |
| Basic Dock (USB-C) | | | | | | | | | | | All | | | | | | | | | | | | | | |

The ThinkPad 25th anniversary edition was released on October 5, 2017. It was based on the T470, but brought back the classic 7-row keyboard. In 2018, Lenovo introduced the ThinkPad A485, which officially is not part of the T series, but it shares the same housing as the T480. It offers an AMD Ryzen PRO 2000 processor and lacks Thunderbolt 3 support but has USB-C support. The A475 had been similarly released in 2017 as a variation of the T470, but with AMD Carrizo or Bristol Ridge processors. In 2019 Lenovo officially introduced AMD CPUs in the T series, and differentiated it with the digit 5 at the end of the model number (i.e. T495).

From 2020 onwards, the naming scheme was changed again, with the letter "T" followed by the screen size in inches, then the generation number and the screen size and CPU manufacturer in brackets (e.g. T14s Gen 2 (14" Intel), T16 Gen 1 (16" AMD)), similar to the scheme used by the X1 series.

== Lenovo-branded models ==
Battery configuration

| Main | M(x) | Main hot-swappable (max.cells) | Secondary | U | Ultrabay removable |
| Main | M(x) | Main hot-swappable (max.cells) | Secondary | u | Ultrabay unremovable |
| Main | M(x) | Main removable (max.cells) | Secondary | m(x) | internal (max.cells) "PowerBridge" |
| Main | m(x) | Main internal (max.cells) | Secondary | S | Slice battery |

Laptop color codes

Processor

Socketed desktop processor
Socketed mobile processor
Soldered high power processor
Soldered standard power processor
Soldered low power processor
Soldered ultra low power processor

Weight

| 0.9 kg (2.0 lb) | Up to 0.91 kg |
| 1.0 kg (2.2 lb) | 0.92–1.0 kg |
| 1.1 kg (2.4 lb) | 1.01–1.1 kg |
| 1.2 kg (2.6 lb) | 1.11–1.2 kg |
| 1.3 kg (2.9 lb) | 1.21–1.3 kg |
| 1.4 kg (3.1 lb) | 1.31–1.4 kg |
| 1.5 kg (3.3 lb) | 1.41–1.5 kg |
| 1.6 kg (3.5 lb) | 1.51–1.6 kg |
| 1.7 kg (3.7 lb) | 1.61–1.7 kg |
| 1.8 kg (4.0 lb) | 1.71–1.81 kg |
| 1.9 kg (4.2 lb) | 1.81–1.91 kg |
| 2.0 kg (4.4 lb) | 1.91–2.03 kg |
| 2.1 kg (4.6 lb) | 2.04–2.14 kg |
| 2.3 kg (5.1 lb) | 2.15–2.4 kg |
| 2.5 kg (5.5 lb) | 2.41–2.75 kg |
| 2.8 kg (6.2 lb) | 2.76–3.05 kg |
| 3.1 kg (6.8 lb) | 3.06–3.42 kg |
| 3.5 kg (7.7 lb) | 3.43–3.99 kg |
| 4.0 kg (8.8 lb) | 4.0–4.99 kg |
| 5.5 kg (12 lb) | 5.0–6.49 kg |
| 7.2 kg (16 lb) | 6.5–7.99 kg |
| 9.1 kg (20 lb) | 8.0–9.99 kg |
| 10.7 kg (24 lb) | 10–11.99 kg |
| 12.7 kg (28 lb) | 12–14.49 kg |
| 14.5 kg (32 lb) | 14.5–17.99 kg |
| 18.1 kg (40 lb) | 18–20.99 kg |
| 21.7 kg (48 lb) | 21–23.99 kg |
| 24 kg (53 lb) | 24–28.99 kg |
| 29.5 kg (65 lb) | 29 kg and above |

Screen resolution

4K or higher
1440p+ (WQHD, QXGA)
1080p+ (Full HD, UXGA)
Better than 768p (SXGA,SXGA+)
600p+ (SVGA, HD, XGA, HD+)
Up to 600p (VGA)

Graphics

Dual standard socket graphics option
Dual proprietary socket graphics option
Standard socket graphics option
Proprietary socket graphics option
Soldered performance graphics option
Soldered midrange graphics option
Soldered mainstream graphics option
Soldered entry graphics option
Integrated entry graphics
Integrated basic graphics

Laptop storage combinations (excluding WWAN slot)

| Level | PCIe 4.0 x4 | PCIe 3.0 x4 | PCIe 3.0 x2 | M.2 SATA | mSATA | 1.8" SATA | 2.5" SATA | 1.8" IDE | 2.5" IDE |
|---|---|---|---|---|---|---|---|---|---|
| | 2019; Not yet (laptops) | 2013 | 2013 | 2013 | 2009 | 2003 | 2003 | 1991 | 1988 |
| | 3 | | | | | | 2 | | |
| | 4 | | | | | | | | |
| | 3 | | | | | | 1 | | |
| | 2 | | | | | | 2 | | |
| | 3 | | | | | 2 | | | |
| | 3 | | | | | | | | |
| | 2 | | | | | | 1 | | |
| | 4 | | | | | | | | |
| | 3 | | | | | 1 | | | |
| | 2 | | | | | 2 | | | |
| | 2 | | | | | | | | |
| | 1 | | | | | | 1 | | |
| | 3 | | | | | | | | |
| | 2 | | | | | 1 | | | |
| | 1 | | | | | | | | |
| | 2 | | | | | | | | |
| | 1 | | | | | 1 | | | |
| | | | 2 | | | | 1 | | |
| | | | | | | | 4 | | |
| | | 1 | | | | | | | |
| | | | 1 | | | | 1 | | |
| | | | | | | | 3 | | |
| | | | 1 | | | | | | |
| | | | | 1 | | | 1 | | |
| | | | | | 1 | | 1 | | |
| | | | | | | 1 | 1 | | |
| | | | | | | | 2 | | |
| | | | | | | | | | 3 |
| | | | | | | 1 | | | |
| | | | | | | | 1 | | |
| | | | | | | | | | 2 |
| | | | | | | | | 1 | |
| | | | | | | | | | 1 |

Laptop memory

| Amount | LPDDR5X | LPDDR5 | DDR5 | LPDDR4X | LPDDR4 | DDR4 | LPDDR3 | DDR4 | DDR3L | | DDR3 | | DDR2 | | DDR | SDR | EDO | FPM |
| Amount | | | | | | dual channel | | < dual channel | dual channel | < dual channel | dual channel | < dual channel | dual channel | < dual channel | | | | |
|---|---|---|---|---|---|---|---|---|---|---|---|---|---|---|---|---|---|---|
| Amount | 2022 (laptops) | 2019 (laptops) | 2020 | 2017 | 2014 | 2014 | 2012 | 2014 | 2010 | | 2007 | | 2003 | | 1998 | 1993 | 1993 | 1987 |
| max memory = 512 GB | N/A | N/A | 512 GB | N/A | N/A | N/A | N/A | N/A | N/A | N/A | N/A | N/A | N/A | N/A | N/A | N/A | N/A | N/A |
| max memory = 256 GB | N/A | | 256 GB (4 slots) | N/A | N/A | N/A | N/A | N/A | N/A | N/A | N/A | N/A | N/A | N/A | N/A | N/A | N/A | N/A |
| max memory = 128 GB | 128 GB | | 128 GB | N/A | N/A | 128 GB (4 slots) | N/A | N/A | N/A | N/A | N/A | N/A | N/A | N/A | N/A | N/A | N/A | N/A |
| 64 GB ≤ max memory < 128 GB | | 64 GB | | N/A | N/A | 64 GB | N/A | 64 GB (2 slots) | 64 GB (4 slots) | N/A | N/A | N/A | N/A | N/A | N/A | N/A | N/A | N/A |
| 32 GB ≤ max memory < 64 GB | | | | 32 GB | 32 GB | 32 GB | N/A | | 32 GB | 32 GB (2 slots) | 32 GB (4 slots) | N/A | N/A | N/A | N/A | N/A | N/A | N/A |
| 16 GB ≤ max memory < 32 GB | | | | | | 16 GB | 16 GB | | 16 GB | | 16 GB | 16 GB (2 slots) | 16 GB (4 slots) | N/A | N/A | N/A | N/A | N/A |
| 8 GB ≤ max memory < 16 GB | | | | | | 8 GB | | | 8 GB | | 8 GB | | 8 GB | 8 GB (2 slots) | 8 GB (4 slots) | N/A | N/A | N/A |
| 4 GB ≤ max memory < 8 GB | | | | | | 4 GB | | | 4 GB | | 4 GB | | 4 GB | | 4 GB | 4 GB (4 slots) | 4 GB (4 slots) | N/A |
| 2 GB ≤ max memory < 4 GB | | | | | | 2 GB (8 chips) | | | 2 GB | | 2 GB | | 2 GB | | | 2 GB | 2 GB | N/A |
| 1 GB ≤ max memory < 2 GB | | | 1 GB (1 chip) | dual channel min | dual channel min | N/A | | single channel min | 1 GB | | 1 GB | | 1 GB | | | | | 1 GB (4 slots) |
| 512 MB ≤ max memory < 1 GB | N/A | N/A | N/A | single channel min | single channel min | N/A | dual channel min | half channel min | 512 MB (8 chips) | | 512 MB (8 chips) | | 512 MB | | | | | 512 MB |
| 256 MB ≤ max memory < 512 MB | N/A | N/A | N/A | 256 MB (1 chip) | 256 MB (1 chip) | N/A | single channel min | 256 MB (1 chip) | N/A | single channel min | N/A | single channel min | 256 MB | | | | | |
| 128 MB ≤ max memory < 256 MB | N/A | N/A | N/A | N/A | N/A | N/A | 128 MB (1 chip) | N/A | N/A | half channel min | N/A | half channel min | | | | | | |
| 64 MB ≤ max memory < 128 MB | N/A | N/A | N/A | N/A | N/A | N/A | N/A | N/A | N/A | 64 MB (1 chip) | N/A | 64 MB (1 chip) | | | | | | |
| max memory < 64 MB | N/A | N/A | N/A | N/A | N/A | N/A | N/A | N/A | N/A | N/A | N/A | N/A | | | | | | |

=== 2008-2009 ===
==== T400s ====
The ThinkPad T400s is a slimmed-down T400 with a soldered 25 W processor, support for smaller batteries, and no discrete graphics option.

==== T500 ====
| Model | Release (US) | Dimensions (mm / in) | Weight ^{(min)} | CPU | Chipset | Memory ^{(max)} | Graphics | Storage | Networking | Audio | Screen | Battery | Other | Operating System |
14"
| T400 | July 2008 | 335.5 × 270 × 28–32; 13.21 × 10.63 × 1.10–1.26 | 2.3 kg (5.1 lb) | Up to Intel Core 2 Duo T9600 (2C2T 2.8 GHz 6 MB L2) | Mobile Intel GM45 Express | 8 GB DDR3 1066 MHz (2 slots) | Intel GMA 4500MHD; Optional ATI Mobility Radeon HD 3470 (256 MiB GDDR3) | One UltraBay; One 2.5" Drive | Intel 82567LM Gigabit Ethernet; Intel WiFi Link 5100 Mini PCIe Card; Optional BT 2.1 Module; Optional WWAN Mini PCIe Card (exclusive) | High Definition (HD) Audio & Conexant CX20561 with stereo speakers and digital microphone | 16:10 aspect ratio 1280 × 800 TN; 1440 × 900 TN | M(9); U | One white ThinkLight | Windows XP Professional preinstalled through downgrade rights in Genuine Windows 7 Professional 32-bit |
| T400s | June 2009 | 337 × 241 × 21.1–25.9; 13.27 × 9.49 × 0.83–1.02 | 1.75 kg (3.9 lb) | Up to Intel Core 2 Duo SP9400 (2C2T 2.4 GHz 6 MB L2) | Intel GS45 | 8 GB DDR3 1066 MHz (2 slots) | Intel GMA 4500MHD | One UltraBay; One 2.5" Drive | Intel 82567LM Gigabit Ethernet; Intel WiFi Link 5100 Mini PCIe Card; Optional BT 2.1 Module; Optional Verizon or AT&T WWAN Mini PCIe Card (exclusive) | | 16:10 aspect ratio 1440 × 900 TN | M(6); U | One white ThinkLight | |
15"
| T500 | July 2008 | 357.5 × 255 × 30–34; 14.07 × 10.04 × 1.18–1.34 | 2.67 kg (5.9 lb) | Up to Intel Core 2 Duo T9800 (2C2T 2.93 GHz 6 MB L2) | Intel GM45 | 8 GB DDR3 1066 MHz (2 slots) | Intel GMA 4500MHD; Optional ATI Mobility Radeon HD 3650 (256 MB GDDR3) | One 2.5" SATA; One Ultrabay | Gigabit Ethernet; Wi-Fi Mini PCIe Card; Optional BT 2.1 Module; Optional WWAN Mini PCIe Card (exclusive) | | 16:10 aspect ratio 1280 × 800 TN; 1680 × 1050 TN; 1920 × 1200 TN | M(9) U | One white ThinkLight | |

=== 2010 ===
==== T410 ====
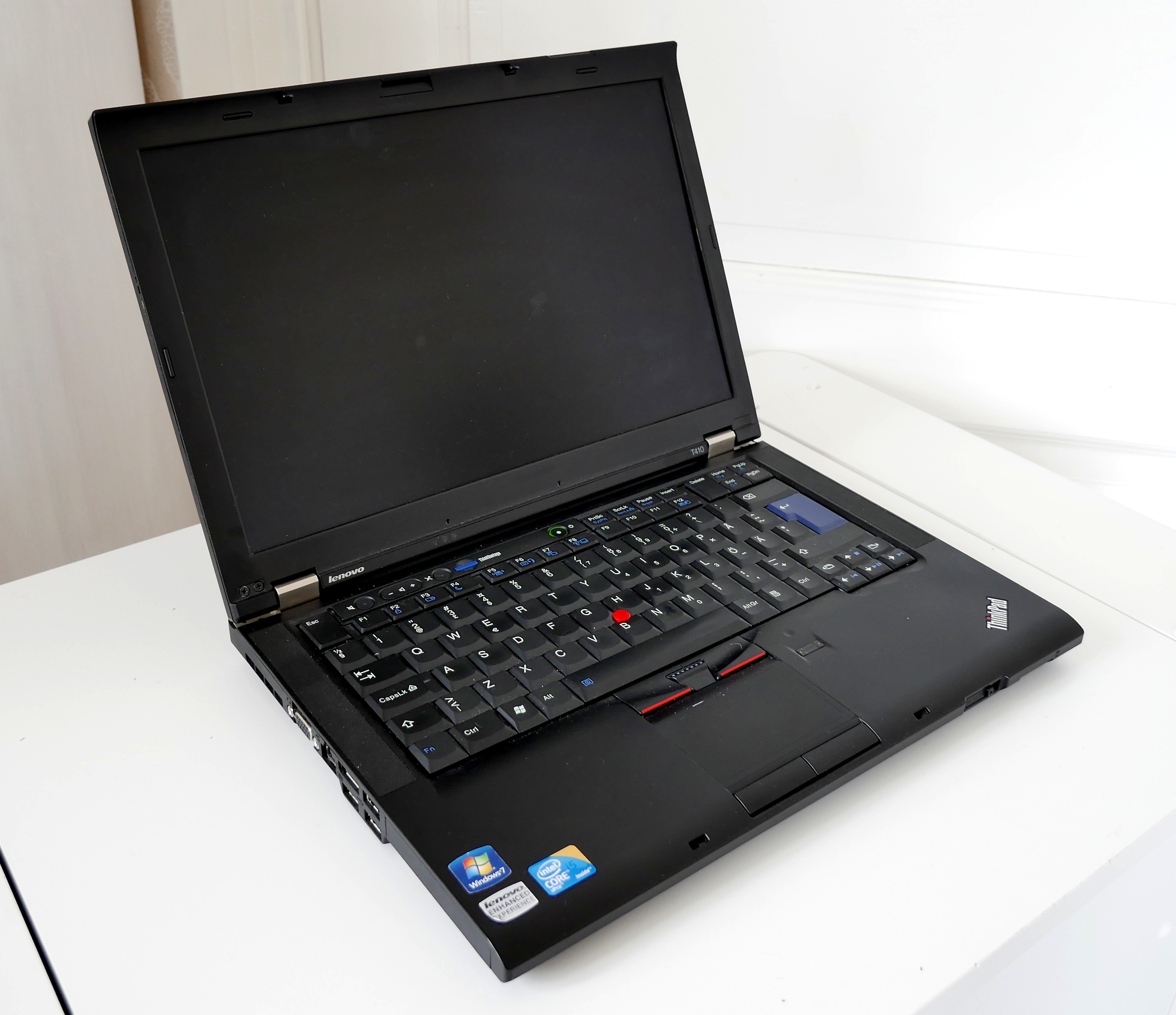
Lenovo ThinkPad T410

With this model, Lenovo started to change the standard Insert Delete Home End PgUp PgDn block on the top right of the keyboard. The Insert key moved above the F12 key and the height of a Delete key was doubled.

In April 1st, 2014, Lenovo issued a product recall, on specific ranges of ThinkPad series batteries which had shipped from October 2010 to April 2011 due to a potential fire hazard, including some shipping with/for that model.

==== T410s ====
While the T410 and T510 use the Serial UltraBay Enhanced, the T410s continues to use the Serial UltraBay Slim to achieve a thin and light design.

==== T510 ====
| Model | Release (US) | Dimensions (mm / in) | Weight ^{(min)} | CPU | Chipset | Memory ^{(max)} | Graphics | Storage | Networking | Audio | Screen | Battery | Other | Operating System |
14"
| T410 | Jan 2010 | 335.5 × 239 × 27.6–31.9; 13.21 × 9.41 × 1.09–1.26 | 2.23 kg (4.9 lb) | 1st Gen Intel Core; Up to i7-620M (2C4T 2.66/3.33 GHz Turbo) | Intel QM57 | 8 GB DDR3 1066 MHz (2 slots) | Intel GMA HD; Optional Nvidia Quadro NVS 3100M (512 MB GDDR3) | One UltraBay; One 2.5" Drive | Intel 82577LC or Intel 82577LM (vPro); Gigabit Ethernet; Intel Centrino Wireless-N 1000 or Intel Centrino Advanced-N + WiMAX 6250; Half Mini PCIe Card; Optional BT 2.1 Module Optional Gobi AT&T WWAN Mini PCIe Card (exclusive) | High Defi nition (HD) Audio & Conexant 20585 with stereo speakers, speaker volume up, down and mute buttons, dual array microphone, mic mute button and combo audio/mic jack | 16:10 aspect ratio 1280 × 800 TN; 1440 × 900 TN | M(9) S | One white ThinkLight | Windows 7 |
| T410s | Jan 2010 | 337 × 241.5 × 21.1–25.9; 13.27 × 9.51 × 0.83–1.02 | 1.77 kg (3.9 lb) | 1st Gen Intel Core; Up to i5-560M (2C4T 2.66/3.2 GHz Turbo) | Intel QS57 | 8 GB DDR3 1066 MHz (2 slots) | Intel GMA HD; Optional Nvidia NVS 3100M (512 MB GDDR3) | One UltraBay; One 2.5" Drive | Intel 82577LC or Intel 82577LM (vPro); Gigabit Ethernet; ThinkPad 11 WiFi or Intel Centrino Wireless-N 1000 or Intel Centrino Advanced-N + WiMAX 6250 or Intel Centrino Ultimate-N 6300 Half Mini PCIe Card; Optional BT 2.1 Module; Optional Gobi AT&T WWAN Mini PCIe Card (exclusive) | | 16:10 aspect ratio 1440 × 900 TN | M(6) U | One white ThinkLight | |
15"
| T510 | Jan 2010 | 372.8 × 245.1 × 32–35.8; 14.68 × 9.65 × 1.26–1.41 | 2.57 kg (5.7 lb) | 1st Gen Intel Core; Up to i7-640M (2C4T 2.8 GHz 4 MB L3) | Intel QM57 | 8 GiB DDR3 1333 MHz or 16 GiB DDR3 1333 MHz (quad core) (2 slots) | Intel HD Graphics; Optional Nvidia NVS 3100M (512 MB GDDR3) | One 2.5" SATA Drive; One Ultrabay | Gigabit Ethernet; Wi-Fi Half Mini PCIe Card; Optional BT 2.1 Module; Optional WWAN Mini PCIe Card (exclusive) | | 1366 × 768 TN; 1600 × 900 TN; 1920 × 1080 TN | M(9) S | One white ThinkLight | |
Nvidia graphics cards switch with Optimus Technology.

=== 2011 ===
==== T520 ====
| Model | Release (US) | Dimensions (mm / in) | Weight ^{(min)} | CPU | Chipset | Memory ^{(max)} | Graphics | Storage | Networking | Audio | Screen | Battery | Other | Operating System |
14"
| T420 | Feb 2011 | 340.5 × 233 × 30.5; 13.41 × 9.17 × 1.20 | 2.24 kg (4.9 lb) | 2nd Gen Intel Core; Up to i7-2670QM (4C8T 2.2/3.3 GHz Turbo) | Intel QM67 | 16 GiB DDR3 1333 MHz (2 slots) | Intel HD 3000; Optional Nvidia NVS 4200M (1 GiB GDDR3) | One UltraBay; One 2.5" Drive | Intel 82579LM Gigabit Ethernet; Intel Centrino Wireless-N 1000 or Intel Centrino Advanced-N 6205 or Intel Centrino Advanced-N + WiMAX 6250; Half Mini PCIe Card; BT 3.0 Module Optional Gobi WWAN mSATA Card | High Defi nition (HD) Audio & Conexant 20672 with stereo speakers, volume up, down, mute buttons, dual array mic, mic mute button and combo audio/mic jack | 1366 × 768 TN; 1600 × 900 TN | M(9); S | One white ThinkLight | Windows 7 Professional |
| T420s | Feb 2011 | 343 × 230.1 × 21.2–26; 13.50 × 9.06 × 0.83–1.02 | 1.78 kg (3.9 lb) | 2nd Gen Intel Core; Up to i7-2640M (2C4T 2.8/3.5 GHz Turbo) | Intel QM67 | 16 GiB DDR3 1333 MHz (2 slots) | Intel HD 3000; Optional Nvidia NVS 4200M (1 GiB GDDR3) | One UltraBay; One 2.5" Drive | Intel 82579LM Gigabit Ethernet ThinkPad 11 Wireless Intel Centrino Wireless-N 1000 or Intel Centrino Advanced-N 6205; Half Mini PCIe Card; BT 3.0 Module Optional Gobi WWAN mSATA Card | | 1600 × 900 TN | M(6); U | One white ThinkLight | Windows 7 Professional |
15"
| T520 | Feb 2011 | 372.8 × 245.1 × 31.8–35.6; 14.68 × 9.65 × 1.25–1.40 | 2.51 kg (5.5 lb) | 2nd Gen Intel Core; Up to i7-2860QM (4C8T 2.5 GHz 8 MB L3) | Intel QM67 | 16 GiB DDR3 1333 MHz (2 slots) | Intel HD 3000; Optional Nvidia NVS 4200M (1 GiB GDDR3) | One 2.5" Drive; One UltraBay Drive | Gigabit Ethernet; Wi-Fi Half Mini PCIe Card; Optional BT 3.0 Module; Optional WWAN mSATA Card | | 1366 × 768 TN; 1600 × 900 TN; 1920 × 1080 TN | M(9) S | One white ThinkLight | Windows 7 Professional |
Nvidia graphics cards switch with Optimus Technology.

=== 2012 ===
Original standard five/six-key block (Ins Del Home End PgUp PgDn, the Insert key moved away in 2010 models) disappeared.

==== T530 ====
| Model | Release (US) | Dimensions (mm / in) | Weight ^{(min)} | CPU | Chipset | Memory ^{(max)} | Graphics | Storage | Networking | Audio | Screen | Battery | Other | Operating System |
14"
| T430 | June 2012 | 340.5 × 232 × 29.9; 13.41 × 9.13 × 1.18 | 2.17 kg (4.8 lb) | 3rd Gen Intel Core; Up to i7-3840QM (4C8T 2.8/3.8 GHz Turbo) | Intel QM77 | 16 GiB DDR3L 1600 MHz (2 slots) | Intel HD 4000; Optional Nvidia NVS 5400M (1 GiB GDDR3) | One UltraBay; One 2.5" Drive | Gigabit Ethernet; Wi-Fi Half Mini PCIe Card; BT 4.0 Module; Optional WWAN mSATA Card | HD Audio & Realtek ALC3202 with Dolby Advanced Audio, stereo speakers, volume up, down, mute buttons / dual array mic, mic mute button and combo audio/mic jack | 1366 × 768 TN; 1600 × 900 TN | M(9); S | One white ThinkLight | Windows 7 Professional |
| T430s | June 2012 | 343 × 230 × 21.2–26; 13.50 × 9.06 × 0.83–1.02 | 1.78 kg (3.9 lb) | 3rd Gen Intel Core; Up to i7-3520M (2C4T 2.9/3.6 GHz Turbo) | Intel QM77 | 16 GiB DDR3L 1600 MHz (2 slots) | Intel HD 4000; Optional Nvidia NVS 5200M (1 GiB GDDR3) | One UltraBay; One 2.5" Drive | Gigabit Ethernet; Wi-Fi Half Mini PCIe Card; BT 4.0 Module; Optional WWAN mSATA Card | | 1366 × 768 TN; 1600 × 900 TN | M(6) U | One white ThinkLight | |
| T430u | Sept 2012 | 340 × 236 × 21; 13.39 × 9.29 × 0.83 | 1.85 kg (4.1 lb) | 3rd Gen Intel Core; Up to i7-3517U (2C4T 1.9/3.0 GHz Turbo) | Intel QS77 | 16 GiB DDR3L 1600 MHz (2 slots) | Intel HD 4000; Optional Nvidia GeForce GT 620M (1 GiB DDR3) | One 2.5" Drive | Gigabit Ethernet; Wi-Fi + Optional BT Half Mini PCIe Card; Optional WWAN mSATA Card | | 1366 × 768 TN | m | One white ThinkLight | |
15"
| T530 | June 2012 | 372.8 × 245.1 × 31.8–35.6; 14.68 × 9.65 × 1.25–1.40 | 2.45 kg (5.4 lb) | 3rd Gen Intel Core; Up to i7-3940XM (4C8T 3.0 GHz 8 MB L3) | Intel QM77 | 16 GiB DDR3L 1600 MHz (2 slots) | Intel HD 4000; Optional Nvidia NVS 5400M (1 GiB GDDR3) | One 2.5" Drive; One UltraBay | Gigabit Ethernet; Wi-Fi Half Mini PCIe Card; Optional BT 4.0 Module; Optional WWAN mSATA Card | | 1366 × 768 TN; 1600 × 900 TN; 1920 × 1080 TN | M(9) S | One white ThinkLight | |
Nvidia graphics cards switch with Optimus Technology.

=== 2013 ===
This line introduces a touchpad with no physical buttons on the top and bottom and latch-less cases on all models. The ThinkLight was removed due to the presence of a backlit keyboard.

==== T440 ====
The ThinkPad T440 builds on a thinner design with soldered 15 W fourth-generation Intel Core processors that are noticeably slower than 35 W third-generation processors. Other changes include 4 GB of soldered memory accompanied by one SO-DIMM slot for expansion, as well as an M.2 2280 slot replacing the mSATA slot. Other features include PowerBridge, the combination of a 3-cell internal battery and a 3- or 6-cell external battery, replacing the UltraBay and slice batteries.

==== T440s ====
Based on the ThinkPad X240, the T440s provides a 14-inch display and 4 GB of soldered DDR3L memory and one SO-DIMM slot instead of no soldered memory and only one SO-DIMM slot

==== T440p ====
Continuation of the T430 design language and reverted to the Serial UltraBay Slim.

==== T540p ====
Continuation of the T430 design language and reverted to the Serial UltraBay Slim. It also adds a numeric keypad.

| Model | Release (US) | Dimensions (mm / in) | Weight ^{(min)} | CPU | Chipset | Memory ^{(max)} | Graphics | Storage | Networking | Audio | Screen | Battery | Other | Operating System |
14"
| T431s | March 2013 | 331 × 226 × 20.65; 13.03 × 8.90 × 0.81 | 1.63 kg (3.6 lb) | 3rd Gen Intel Core; Up to i7-3687U (2C4T 2.1/3.3 GHz Turbo) | | 12 GiB DDR3L 1600 MHz (4 GiB soldered, 1 slot) | Intel HD Graphics 4000 | One 2.5" Drive | Gigabit Ethernet; Wi-Fi + BT M.2 Card; Optional WWAN mSATA Card | HD Audio & Realtek ALC3202 | 1600 × 900 TN | m | | Windows 8.1 Pro |
| T440, T440 Touch | Sept 2013 | 331 × 232.5 × 21; 13.03 × 9.15 × 0.83 | 1.68 kg (3.7 lb) | 4th Gen Intel Core; Up to i7-4600U (2C4T 2.1/3.3 GHz Turbo) | | 8/12 GiB DDR3L 1600 MHz (0/4 GiB soldered, 1 slot) | Intel HD 4400; Optional Nvidia GeForce GT 720M (1 GiB GDDR3) | One 2.5" Drive One M.2 SATA Drive (conflicting) | Gigabit Ethernet; Wi-Fi + BT M.2 Card; Optional WWAN mSATA Card | | 1366 × 768 TN; 1600 × 900 TN | M(6) m | | |
| T440s, T440s Touch | Sept 2013 | 331 × 226 × 20.65; 13.03 × 8.90 × 0.81 | 1.59 kg (3.5 lb) | 4th Gen Intel Core; Up to i7-4600U (2C4T 2.1/3.3 GHz Turbo) | | 12 GiB DDR3L 1600 MHz (4 GiB soldered, 1 slot) | Intel HD 4400; Optional Nvidia GeForce GT 730M (1 GiB DDR3) | One 2.5" Drive One M.2 SATA Drive (conflicting) | Gigabit Ethernet; Wi-Fi + BT M.2 Card; Optional WWAN mSATA Card | | 1600 × 900 TN; 1920 × 1080 IPS | M(6) m | | |
| T440p | Nov 2013 | 335 × 229.1 × 27.9–29.95; 13.19 × 9.02 × 1.10–1.18 | 2.14 kg (4.7 lb) | 4th Gen Intel Core; Up to i7-4910MQ (4C8T 2.9/3.9 GHz Turbo) | Intel QM87 | 16 GiB DDR3L 1600 MHz (2 slots) | Intel HD 4600; Optional Nvidia GeForce GT 730M (1 GiB DDR3) | One 2.5" Drive; One UltraBay | Gigabit Ethernet; Wi-Fi + BT M.2 Card; Optional WWAN mSATA Card | | 1366 × 768 TN; 1600 × 900 TN; 1920 × 1080 IPS | M(9) u | | |
15"
| T540p | Nov 2013 | 376.6 × 248.1 × 29.9–33.9; 14.83 × 9.77 × 1.18–1.33 | 2.41 kg (5.3 lb) | 4th Gen Intel Core; Up to i7-4900MQ (4C8T 2.8 GHz 8 MB L3) | Intel QM87 | 16 GiB DDR3L 1600 MHz (2 slots) | Intel HD 4600; Optional Nvidia GeForce GT 730M (2 GiB DDR3) | One 2.5" SATA Drive; One Ultrabay | Gigabit Ethernet; Wi-Fi + BT M.2 Card; Optional WWAN M.2 SATA Card | | 1366 × 768 TN; 1920 × 1080 TN; 2880 × 1620 IPS | M(9) u | | |
Nvidia graphics cards switch with Optimus Technology.

=== 2015 ===
==== T450 ====
Reverts to two SO-DIMMs, the previous touchpad but only with the physical TrackPoint buttons.

==== T450s ====
Reverts to the previous touchpad but only with the physical TrackPoint buttons.

==== T550 ====
Based on the T450 design. A version with entry-level professional GPU options and ISV certifications is available and known as W550s.

| Model | Release (US) | Dimensions (mm / in) | Weight ^{(min)} | CPU | Chipset | Memory ^{(max)} | Graphics | Storage | Networking | Audio | Screen | Battery | Other | Operating System |
14"
| T450 | Jan 2015 | 339 × 232.5 × 21; 13.35 × 9.15 × 0.83 | 1.81 kg (4.0 lb) | 5th Gen Intel Core i3-5010U (2C4T 2.1 GHz) i5-5200U (2C4T 2.2/2.7 GHz Turbo) i5-5300U (2C4T 2.3/2.9 GHz Turbo) i7-5600U (2C4T 2.6/3.2 GHz Turbo) | | 32 GiB DDR3L 1600 MHz (2 slots) | Intel HD 5500; Optional Nvidia GeForce 940M (1 GiB DDR3) | One 2.5" Drive One M.2 SATA Drive (conflicting) | Gigabit Ethernet; Wi-Fi + BT M.2 Card; Optional WWAN M.2 SATA Card | HD Audio & Realtek ALC3232 with stereo speakers, dual array microphone and combo audio/microphone jack | 1366 × 768 TN; 1600 × 900 TN; 1600 × 900 IPS Touch; 1920 × 1080 IPS | M(6) m | | |
| T450s | Feb 2015 | 331 × 226.8 × 20.65; 13.03 × 8.93 × 0.81 | 1.58 kg (3.5 lb) | 5th Gen Intel Core i5-5200U (2C4T 2.2/2.7 GHz Turbo) i5-5300U (2C4T 2.3/2.9 GHz Turbo) i7-5600U (2C4T 2.6/3.2 GHz Turbo) | | 20 GiB DDR3L 1600 MHz (4 GiB soldered, 1 slot) | Intel HD 5500; Optional Nvidia GeForce 940M (1 GiB DDR3) | One 2.5" drive One M.2 SATA Drive (conflicting) | Gigabit Ethernet; Wi-Fi + BT M.2 Card; Optional WWAN M.2 SATA Card | | Anti-glare: 1600 × 900 TN; 1920 × 1080 IPS; 1920 × 1080 IPS Touch | M(6) m | | |
15"
| T550 | Jan 2015 | 380.6 × 258.2 × 22.45; 14.98 × 10.17 × 0.88 | 2.26 kg (5.0 lb) | 5th Gen Intel Core i5-5200U (2C4T 2.2 GHz 3 MB L3) i5-5300U (2C4T 2.3 GHz 3 MB L3) i7-5600U (2C4T 2.6 GHz 4 MB L3) | | 32 GiB DDR3L 1600 MHz (2 slots) | Intel HD 5500; Optional Nvidia GeForce 940M (1 GiB DDR3) (Available in Western Europe Only) | One 2.5" drive One M.2 SATA Drive | Gigabit Ethernet; Wi-Fi + BT M.2 Card; Optional WWAN M.2 SATA Card | | 1366 × 768 TN; 1920 × 1080 TN; 2880 × 1620 IPS | M(6) m | | |
Nvidia graphics cards switch with Optimus Technology.

=== 2016 ===
==== T560 ====
| Model | Release (US) | Dimensions (mm / in) | Weight ^{(min)} | CPU | Chipset | Memory ^{(max)} | Graphics | Storage | Networking | Audio | Screen | Battery | Other | Operating System |
14"
| T460 | Feb 2016 | 339 × 232.5 × 21; 13.35 × 9.15 × 0.83 | 1.73 kg (3.8 lb) | 6th Gen Intel Core i3-6100U (2C4T 2.3 GHz) i5-6200U (2C4T 2.3/2.8 GHz Turbo) i5-6300U (2C4T 2.4/3.0 GHz Turbo) i7-6500U (2C4T 2.5/3.1 GHz Turbo) i7-6600U (2C4T 2.6/3.4 GHz Turbo) | | 32 GB DDR3L 1600 MHz (2 slots) | Intel HD Graphics 520; Optional Nvidia GeForce 940MX (2 GiB DDR3) | One 2.5" Drive or One M.2 x2 Drive | Gigabit Ethernet; Wi-Fi + BT M.2 Card; Optional WWAN M.2 x1 Card (exclusive) | HD Audio & Realtek ALC3245 with stereo speakers, dual array microphone and combo audio/microphone jack | Anti-glare: 1366 × 768 TN; 1920 × 1080 IPS; 1920 × 1080 IPS Touch | M(6) m | | |
| T460s | Feb 2016 | 331 × 226.8 × 16.9–18.8; 13.03 × 8.93 × 0.67–0.74 | 1.36 kg (3.0 lb) | 6th Gen Intel Core i5-6200U (2C4T 2.3/2.8 GHz Turbo) i5-6300U (2C4T 2.4/3.0 GHz Turbo) i7-6600U (2C4T 2.6/3.4 GHz Turbo) | | 36/40 GB DDR4 2133 MHz (4/8 GB soldered, 1 slot) | Intel HD 520; Optional Nvidia GeForce 930MX (2 GiB DDR3) | One M.2 x4 | Gigabit Ethernet; Wi-Fi + BT M.2 Card; Optional WWAN M.2 x1 Card (exclusive) | | Anti-glare: 1920 × 1080 IPS; 1920 × 1080 IPS Touch; 2560 × 1440 IPS | m*2 | | |
| T460p | Feb 2016 | 344 × 239 × 24.4; 13.54 × 9.41 × 0.96 | 1.81 kg (4.0 lb) | 6th Gen Intel Core i5-6300HQ (4C4T 2.3/3.2 GHz Turbo) i5-6440HQ (4C4T 2.6/3.5 GHz Turbo) i7-6700HQ (4C8T 2.6/3.5 GHz Turbo) i7-6820HQ (4C8T 2.7/3.6 GHz Turbo) | Intel QM170 | 64 GiB DDR4 2133 MHz (2 slots) | Intel HD 530; Optional Nvidia GeForce 940MX (2 GiB DDR3) | One 2.5" Drive or One M.2 x2 Drive | Gigabit Ethernet; Wi-Fi + BT M.2 Card; Optional WWAN M.2 x1 Card | | 1920 × 1080 IPS, Anti-glare; 2560 × 1440 IPS | M(6) | | |
15"
| T560 | Feb 2016 | 380.6 × 258.2 × 22.45; 14.98 × 10.17 × 0.88 | 2.22 kg (4.9 lb) | 6th Gen Intel Core i5-6200U (2C4T 2.3 GHz 3 MB L3) i5-6300U (2C4T 2.4 GHz 3 MB L3) i7-6500U (2C4T 2.5 GHz 4 MB L3) i7-6600U (2C4T 2.6 GHz 4 MB L3) | | 32 GB DDR3L 1600 MHz (2 slots) | Intel HD 520; Optional Nvidia GeForce 940MX (2 GiB DDR3) | One 2.5" Drive or One M.2 x2 Drive | Gigabit Ethernet; Wi-Fi + BT M.2 Card; Optional WWAN M.2 x1 Card | | Anti-glare: 1366 × 768 TN; 1920 × 1080 IPS; 2880 × 1620 IPS | M(6) m | | |
Nvidia graphics cards switch with Optimus Technology.

=== 2017 ===
==== T570 ====
| Model | Release (US) | Dimensions (mm / in) | Weight ^{(min)} | CPU | Chipset | Memory ^{(max)} | Graphics | Storage | Networking | Audio | Screen | Battery | Other | Operating System |
14"
| T470 | Feb 2017 | 336.6 × 232.5 × 19.95; 13.25 × 9.15 × 0.79 | 1.58 kg (3.5 lb) | 6th Gen Intel Core i5-6200U (2C4T 2.2/2.8 GHz Turbo) i5-6300U (2C4T 2.4/3.0 GHz Turbo) i7-6500U (2C4T 2.5/3.1 GHz Turbo) i7-6600U (2C4T 2.6/3.4 GHz Turbo) 7th Gen Intel Core i3-7100U (2C4T 2.4 GHz) i5-7200U (2C4T 2.5/3.1 GHz Turbo) i5-7300U (2C4T 2.6/3.5 GHz Turbo) i7-7500U (2C4T 2.7/3.5 GHz Turbo) i7-7600U (2C4T 2.8/3.9 GHz Turbo) | | 64 GiB DDR4 — 2133 MHz (2 slots) | Intel HD 520 (Gen6 CPUs); Intel HD 620 (Gen7 CPUs); Optional Nvidia GeForce 940MX (2 GiB GDDR5) | One 2.5" 7mm Drive or One M.2 x2 Drive | Gigabit Ethernet; Wi-Fi + BT M.2 Card; Optional WWAN M.2 x1 Card | | Anti-glare: 1366 × 768 TN; 1920 × 1080 TN; 1920 × 1080 IPS; 1920 × 1080 IPS Touch | M(6) m | One TB3 x2 | Windows 10 Pro |
| A475 | Sep 2017 | 336.6 × 232.5 × 19.95; 13.25 × 9.15 × 0.79 | 1.58 kg (3.5 lb) | AMD Carrizo or Bristol Ridge | | 64 GiB DDR4 1866 MHz (2 slots) | AMD Radeon R5 or R7 Graphics | One 2.5" 7mm Drive or One M.2 x2 Drive | Gigabit Ethernet; Wi-Fi + BT M.2 Card; Optional WWAN M.2 x1 Card | | 1366 × 768 TN; 1920 × 1080 IPS; 1920 × 1080 IPS Touch (on cell) | M(6) m | One TB3 x2 | Windows 10 Pro |
| T470s | Mar 2017 | 331 × 226.8 × 16.9–18.8; 13.03 × 8.93 × 0.67–0.74 | 1.32 kg (2.9 lb) | 6th Gen Intel Core i5-6200U (2C4T 2.2/2.8 GHz Turbo) i5-6300U (2C4T 2.4/3.0 GHz Turbo) i7-6600U (2C4T 2.6/3.4 GHz Turbo) 7th Gen Intel Core i5-7200U (2C4T 2.5/3.1 GHz Turbo) i5-7300U (2C4T 2.6/3.5 GHz Turbo) i7-7500U (2C4T 2.7/3.5 GHz Turbo) i7-7600U (2C4T 2.8/3.9 GHz Turbo) | | 36/40 GB DDR4 2133 MHz (4/8 GB soldered, 1 slot) | Intel HD 520 (Gen6 CPUs); Intel HD 620 (Gen7 CPUs) | One M.2 x4 | Gigabit Ethernet; Wi-Fi + BT M.2 Card; Optional WWAN M.2 Card (exclusive) | | Anti-glare: 1920 × 1080 IPS; 1920 × 1080 IPS Touch; 2560 × 1440 IPS | m*2 | One TB3 x2 | Windows 10 Pro |
| T470p | May 2017 | 339 × 235 × 24.4; 13.35 × 9.25 × 0.96 | 1.74 kg (3.8 lb) | 7th Gen Intel Core i5-7300HQ (4C4T 2.5/3.5 GHz Turbo) i5-7440HQ (4C4T 2.8/3.8 GHz Turbo) i7-7700HQ (4C8T 2.8/3.8 GHz Turbo) i7-7820HQ (4C8T 2.9/3.9 GHz Turbo) | Intel QM175 | 64 GiB DDR4 2400 MHz (2 slots) | Intel HD 630; Optional Nvidia GeForce 940MX (2 GiB GDDR5) | One 2.5" Drive or One M.2 x2 Drive | Gigabit Ethernet; Wi-Fi + BT M.2 Card; Optional WWAN M.2 x1 Card | | 1920 × 1080 IPS Touch; Anti-glare: 1920 × 1080 IPS; 2560 × 1440 IPS | M(6) | One TB3 x2 | Windows 10 Pro |
| 25th Anniversary Edition | Oct 2017 | 336.6 × 232.5 × 19.95; 13.25 × 9.15 × 0.79 | 1.58 kg (3.5 lb) | 7th Gen Intel Core i7-7500U (2C4T 2.7/3.5 GHz Turbo) | | 64 GiB DDR4 2400 MHz (2 slots) | Nvidia GeForce 940MX (2 GB GDDR5) | One M.2 x2 Drive | Gigabit Ethernet; Wi-Fi + BT M.2 Card; Optional WWAN M.2 x1 Card | | 1920 × 1080 Anti-glare, IPS Touch (Option) | M(6) m | One TB3 x2 | Windows 10 Pro |
15"
| T570 | March 2017 | 365.8 × 252.8 × 19.95–20.2; 14.40 × 9.95 × 0.79–0.80 | 2.04 kg (4.5 lb) | 6th Gen Intel Core i5-6200U (2C4T 2.3 GHz 3 MB L3) i5-6300U (2C4T 2.4 GHz 3 MB L3) i7-6500U (2C4T 2.5 GHz 4 MB L3) i7-6600U (2C4T 2.6 GHz 4 MB L3) 7th Gen Intel Core i5-7200U (2C4T 2.5 GHz 3 MB L3) i5-7300U (2C4T 2.6 GHz 3 MB L3) i7-7500U (2C4T 2.7 GHz 4 MB L3) i7-7600U (2C4T 2.8 GHz 4 MB L3) | | 64 GiB DDR4 2400 MHz (2 slots) | Intel HD 520 (6th Gen Intel Core); Intel HD 620 (7th Gen Intel Core); Optional Nvidia GeForce 940MX(2 GiB GDDR5) | One 2.5" SATA 7mm Drive or One M.2 x2 Drive | Gigabit Ethernet; Wi-Fi + BT M.2 Card; Optional WWAN M.2 x1 Card | | 1366 × 768 TN; 1920 × 1080 IPS; 3840 × 2160 IPS | M(6) m | One TB3 x2 | Windows 10 Pro |
Nvidia graphics cards switch with Optimus Technology.

=== 2018 ===
==== T580 ====
| Model | Release (US) | Dimensions (mm / in) | Weight ^{(min)} | CPU | Chipset | Memory ^{(max)} | Graphics | Storage | Networking | Audio | Screen | Battery | Other | Operating System |
14"
| T480 | Jan 2018 | 336.6 × 232.5 × 19.95; 13.25 × 9.15 × 0.79 | 1.58 kg (3.5 lb) | 7th Gen Intel Core i5-7200U (2C4T 2.5/3.1 GHz Turbo) i5-7300U (2C4T 2.6/3.5 GHz Turbo) 8th Gen Intel Core i3-8130U (2C4T 2.2/3.4 GHz Turbo) i5-8250U (4C8T 1.6/3.4 GHz Turbo) i5-8350U (4C8T 1.7/3.6 GHz Turbo) i7-8550U (4C8T 1.8/4.0 GHz Turbo) i7-8650U (4C8T 1.9/4.2 GHz Turbo) | | 64 GiB DDR4 — 2133 MHz (7th Gen CPUs) or 2400 MHz (8th Gen CPUs) (2 slots) | Intel HD Graphics 620 (7th Gen CPUs); Intel UHD Graphics 620 (8th Gen CPUs); Optional Nvidia GeForce MX150 (2 GiB GDDR5) | One 2.5" 7mm Drive or One M.2 x2 Drive | Gigabit Ethernet; Wi-Fi + BT M.2 Card; Optional WWAN M.2 x2 Card | HD Audio & Realtek ALC3287 with stereo speakers within Dolby Audio Premium, dual array microphone and headphone / microphone combo jack | 1366 × 768 TN; 1920 × 1080 IPS Touch (on cell); 1920 × 1080 IPS; 2560 × 1440 IPS | M(6) m | ThinkShutter; One TB3 x2Soldered charging port | Windows 10 Home; Windows 10 Pro |
| A485 | July 2018 | 336.6 × 232.5 × 19.95; 13.25 × 9.15 × 0.79 | 1.58 kg (3.5 lb) | AMD Ryzen PRO 2000 | | 32 GiB DDR4 2400 MHz (2 slots) | AMD Radeon Vega 6, 8 or 10 | One 2.5" 7mm Drive or One M.2 x2 Drive | Gigabit Ethernet; Wi-Fi + BT M.2 Card; Optional WWAN M.2 x2 Card | | 1366 × 768 TN; 1920 × 1080 IPS; 1920 × 1080 IPS Touch (on cell) | M(6) m | ThinkShutter | Windows 10 Home; Windows 10 Pro |
| T480s | Jan 2018 | 331 × 226.8 × 18.45; 13.03 × 8.93 × 0.73 | 1.32 kg (2.9 lb) | 7th Gen Intel Core i5-7300U 8th Gen Intel Core i5-8250U (4C8T 1.6/3.4 GHz Turbo) i5-8350U (4C8T 1.7/3.6 GHz Turbo) i7-8550U (4C8T 1.8/4.0 GHz Turbo) i7-8650U (4C8T 1.9/4.2 GHz Turbo) | | 36/40 GB DDR4 2400 MHz (4/8 GB soldered, 1 slot) | Intel UHD 620; Optional Nvidia GeForce MX150 (2 GiB GDDR5) | One M.2 x4 Drive | Gigabit Ethernet; Wi-Fi + BT M.2 Card; Optional WWAN M.2 x2 Card | | 1920 × 1080 IPS; 1920 × 1080 IPS touch 2560 × 1440 IPS | m 57Wh | ThinkShutter; One TB3 x2 Soldered charging port | Windows 10 Home; Windows 10 Pro |
15"
| T580 | Jan 2018 | 365.8 × 252.8 × 20.2; 14.40 × 9.95 × 0.80 | 1.97 kg (4.3 lb) | 7th Gen Intel Core i5 i5-7200U (2C4T 2.5 GHz 3 MB L3) i5-7300U (2C4T 2.6 GHz 3 MB L3); 8th Gen Intel Core i5-8250U (4C8T 1.6 GHz 6 MB L3) i5-8350U (4C8T 1.7 GHz 6 MB L3) i7-8550U (4C8T 1.8 GHz 8 MB L3) i7-8650U (4C8T 1.9 GHz 8 MB L3) | | 64 GiB DDR4 2400 MHz (2 slots) | Intel HD 620 (Gen7 CPUs); Intel UHD 620 (Gen8 CPUs) Optional Nvidia GeForce MX150 (2 GiB GDDR5) | One 2.5" SATA 7mm Drive or One M.2 x2 Drive | Gigabit Ethernet; Wi-Fi + BT M.2 Card; Optional WWAN M.2 x1 Card | | Anti-glare: 1920 × 1080 IPS; 1920 × 1080 IPS multi-touch (on cell); 3840 × 2160 IPS | M(6) m | One TB3 x2 Soldered charging port | Windows 10 Pro |
Nvidia graphics cards switch with Optimus Technology.

=== 2019 ===
==== T590 ====
| Model | Release (US) | Dimensions (mm / in) | Weight ^{(min)} | CPU | Chipset | Memory ^{(max)} | Graphics | Storage | Networking | Audio | Screen | Battery | Other | Operating System |
14"
| T490 | Apr 2019 | 329 × 227 × 17.9; 12.95 × 8.94 × 0.70 | 1.46 kg (3.2 lb) | 8th Gen Intel Core i5-8265U (4C8T 1.6/3.9 GHz Turbo) i5-8365U (4C8T 1.6/4.1 GHz Turbo) i7-8565U (4C8T 1.8/4.6 GHz Turbo) i7-8665U (4C8T 1.9/4.8 GHz Turbo) 10th Gen Intel Core i5-10210U (4C8T 1.6/4.2 GHz Turbo) i7-10510U (4C8T 1.8/4.9 GHz Turbo) i7-10710U (6C12T 1.1/4.7 GHz Turbo) | | 40/48 GiB DDR4 2400 MHz (8/16 GiB soldered, 1 slot) | Intel UHD 620; Optional Nvidia GeForce MX250 (2 GiB GDDR5) | One M.2 x4 Drive | Gigabit Ethernet Intel Wireless-AC 9560 Wi-Fi or Wi-Fi 6 AX201 + BT 5.0 (soldered); Optional WWAN M.2 x? Card (exclusive) | High Definition (HD) Audio & Realtek ALC3287 with stereo speakers within Dolby Audio Premium and dual array microphone, far-field | 1366 × 768 TN; 1920 × 1080 IPS Touch (on cell); 1920 × 1080 IPS; 2560 × 1440 IPS | m 50Wh | ThinkShutter; One TB3 x2 Soldered charging port | Windows 10 |
| T495 | May 2019 | 329 × 227 × 17.9; 12.95 × 8.94 × 0.70 | 1.54 kg (3.4 lb) | AMD Ryzen PRO 3000; Ryzen 3 PRO 3300U (4C4T 2.1/3.5 GHz Turbo); Ryzen 5 PRO 3500U (4C8T 2.1/3.7 GHz Turbo); Ryzen 7 PRO 3700U (4C8T 2.3/4.0 GHz Turbo) | | 40/48 GiB DDR4 2400 MHz (8/16 GiB soldered, 1 slot) | AMD Radeon Vega 6, 8 or 10 | One M.2 x4 Drive | Gigabit Ethernet; Wi-Fi + BT 5.1 M.2 Card; Optional WWAN M.2 x2 Card | | 1366 × 768 TN; 1920 × 1080 IPS Touch (on cell); 1920 × 1080 IPS | m 50Wh | ThinkShutter; Two USB-C 10 Gbps w/DP 1.4 | |
| T490s | Apr 2019 | 328.8 × 225.8 × 16.1; 12.94 × 8.89 × 0.63 | 1.27 kg (2.8 lb) | 8th Gen Intel Core i5-8265U (4C8T 1.6/3.9 GHz Turbo) i5-8365U (4C8T 1.6/4.1 GHz Turbo) i7-8565U (4C8T 1.8/4.6 GHz Turbo) i7-8665U (4C8T 1.9/4.8 GHz Turbo) | | 8/16/32 GiB DDR4 2400 MHz (soldered) | Intel UHD 620 | One M.2 x4 Drive | Mini Gigabit Ethernet Intel Wireless-AC 9560 Wi-Fi or Wi-Fi 6 AX200 + BT 5.0 (soldered); Optional WWAN M.2 x? Card (exclusive) | | 1920 × 1080 IPS Touch (on cell); 1920 × 1080 IPS; 2560 × 1440 IPS | m 57Wh | ThinkShutter; One TB3 x2 | |
| T495s | May 2019 | 328.8 × 225.8 × 16.1; 12.94 × 8.89 × 0.63 | 1.25 kg (2.8 lb) | AMD Ryzen PRO 3000; Ryzen 5 PRO 3500U (4C8T 2.1/3.7 GHz Turbo); Ryzen 7 PRO 3700U (4C8T 2.3/4.0 GHz Turbo) | | 8/16 GiB DDR4 2400 MHz (soldered) | AMD Radeon Vega 8 or 10 | One M.2 x4 Drive | Mini Gigabit Ethernet; Wi-Fi + BT 5.1 M.2 Card; Optional WWAN M.2 x2 Card | | 1920 × 1080 IPS Touch (on cell); 1920 × 1080 IPS | m 57Wh | ThinkShutter Two USB-C 10 Gbps w/DP 1.4 | |
15"
| T590 | Apr 2019 | 365.8 × 248 × 19.1; 14.40 × 9.76 × 0.75 | 1.75 kg (3.9 lb) | 8th Gen Intel Core i5-8265U (4C8T 1.6 GHz 6 MB L3) i5-8365U (4C8T 1.6 GHz 6 MB L3) i7-8565U (4C8T 1.8 GHz 6 MB L3) i7-8665U (4C8T 1.9 GHz 6 MB L3) | | 40/48 GiB DDR4 2400 MHz (8/16 GiB soldered, 1 slot) | Intel UHD 620; Optional Nvidia GeForce MX250 (2 GiB GDDR5) | One M.2 x4 Drive | Gigabit Ethernet Intel Wireless-AC 9560 Wi-Fi + BT 5.0 (soldered); Optional WWAN M.2 Card (exclusive) | | Anti-glare: 1920 × 1080 IPS; 1920 × 1080 IPS multi-touch (on cell); 3840 × 2160 IPS | m 57Wh | ThinkShutter; One TB3 x2 Soldered charging port | |
Nvidia graphics cards switch with Optimus Technology.

=== 2020 ===
==== T15p Gen 1 ====
Model with Quadro RTX GPUs known as P15v Gen 1.

==== T15g Gen 1 ====
Model with Quadro RTX GPUs known as P15 Gen 1.

| Model | Release (US) | Dimensions (mm / in) | Weight ^{(min)} | CPU | Chipset | Memory ^{(max)} | Graphics | Storage | Networking | Audio | Screen | Battery | Other | Operating System |
14"
| T14 Gen 1 (Intel) | 2020 | 329 × 227 × 17.9; 12.95 × 8.94 × 0.70 | 1.46 kg (3.2 lb) | 10th Gen Intel Core i5-10210U (4C8T 1.6/4.2 GHz Turbo) i5-10310U (4C8T 1.7/4.4 GHz Turbo) i7-10510U (4C8T 1.8/4.9 GHz Turbo) i7-10610U (4C8T 1.8/4.9 GHz Turbo) | | 40/48 GB — DDR4 2666 MHz (8/16 GB soldered, 1 slot) | Intel UHD 620; Optional Nvidia GeForce MX330 (2 GB GDDR5) | One M.2 x4 Drive | Gigabit Ethernet Intel Wi-Fi 6 AX201 + BT 5.2 (soldered); Optional WWAN M.2 Card | High Definition (HD) Audio & Realtek ALC3287 with Stereo speakers by Dolby Audio and dual array microphone | 1366 × 768 TN; 1920 × 1080 IPS Touch (on cell); 1920 × 1080 IPS; 1920 × 1080 IPS Low Power; 3840 × 2160 IPS HDR400 Dolby Vision | m 50 Wh | ThinkShutter; One TB3 x2 | |
| T14 Gen 1 (AMD) | 2020 | 329 × 227 × 17.9; 12.95 × 8.94 × 0.70 | 1.46 kg (3.2 lb) | AMD Ryzen PRO 4000; Ryzen 5 PRO 4650U (6C12T 2.1/4.0 GHz Turbo); Ryzen 7 PRO 4750U (8C16T 1.7/4.1 GHz Turbo) | | 40/48 GB — DDR4 3200 MHz (8/16 GB soldered, 1 slot) | AMD Radeon 7 nm Vega 6 or 7 | One M.2 x4 Drive | Gigabit Ethernet Intel Wi-Fi 6 AX200 + BT 5.2; Optional WWAN M.2 Card | | 1366 × 768 TN; 1920 × 1080 IPS Touch (on cell); 1920 × 1080 IPS; 1920 × 1080 IPS Low Power; 1920 × 1080 IPS Touch (on cell) Privacy Guard | m 50 Wh | ThinkShutter; Two USB-C 10 Gbps w/DP 1.4 | |
| T14 Secure Access / Healthcare Edition Gen 1 (Intel) | 2020 | 329 × 227 × 17.9; 12.95 × 8.94 × 0.70 | 1.46 kg (3.2 lb) | 10th Gen Intel Core i5-10310U (4C8T 1.7/4.4 GHz Turbo) i7-10610U (4C8T 1.8/4.9 GHz Turbo) | | 40/48 GB — DDR4 2666 MHz (8/16 GB soldered, 1 slot) | Intel UHD 620; Optional Nvidia GeForce MX330 (2 GB GDDR5) | One M.2 x4 Drive | Gigabit Ethernet Intel Wi-Fi 6 AX201 + BT 5.2 (soldered); Optional WWAN M.2 Card | | 1920 × 1080 IPS Touch (on cell); 1920 × 1080 IPS; 1920 × 1080 IPS Touch (on cell) Privacy Guard | m 50 Wh | ThinkShutter; One TB3 x2 | |
| T14s Gen 1 (Intel) | 2020 | 328.8 × 225.8 × 16.1; 12.94 × 8.89 × 0.63 | 1.27 kg (2.8 lb) | 10th Gen Intel Core i5-10210U (4C8T 1.6/4.2 GHz Turbo) i5-10310U (4C8T 1.7/4.4 GHz Turbo) i7-10510U (4C8T 1.8/4.9 GHz Turbo) i7-10610U (4C8T 1.8/4.9 GHz Turbo) | | 8/16/32 GB — DDR4 2666 MHz (soldered) | Intel UHD 620 | One M.2 x4 Drive | Mini Gigabit Ethernet Intel Wi-Fi 6 AX201 + BT 5.1 (soldered); Optional WWAN M.2 Card (?) | | 1920 × 1080 IPS; 1920 × 1080 IPS Touch (on cell); 1920 × 1080IPS PrivacyGuard Touch (on cell); 1920 × 1080 IPS Low Power; 3840 × 2160 IPS | m 57 Wh | ThinkShutter; Two USB-C 10 Gbps w/DP 1.4 | |
| T14s Gen 1 (AMD) | 2020 | 328.8 × 225.8 × 16.1; 12.94 × 8.89 × 0.63 | 1.27 kg (2.8 lb) | AMD Ryzen PRO 4000; Ryzen 5 PRO 4650U (6C12T 2.1/4.0 GHz Turbo); Ryzen 7 PRO 4750U (8C16T 1.7/4.1 GHz Turbo) | | 8/16/32 GB — DDR4 3200 MHz (soldered) | AMD Radeon 7 nm Vega 6 or 7 | One M.2 x4 Drive | Mini Gigabit Ethernet Intel Wi-Fi 6 AX200 + BT 5.1; Optional WWAN M.2 Card (?) | | 1920 × 1080 IPS; 1920 × 1080 IPS Touch (on cell); 1920 × 1080 IPS Low Power; 1920 × 1080 IPS PrivacyGuard Touch (on cell) | m 57 Wh | ThinkShutter; Two USB-C 10 Gbps w/DP 1.4 | |
15"
| T15 Gen 1 | May 2020 | 365.8 × 248 × 19.1; 14.40 × 9.76 × 0.75 | 1.74 kg (3.8 lb) | 10th Gen Intel Core i5-10210U (4C8T 1.6/4.2 GHz Turbo) i5-10310U (4C8T 1.7/4.4 GHz Turbo) i7-10510U (4C8T 1.8/4.9 GHz Turbo) i7-10610U (4C8T 1.8/4.9 GHz Turbo) | | 40/48 GB — DDR4 2666 MHz (8/16 GB soldered, 1 slot) | Intel UHD Graphics; Optional Nvidia GeForce MX330 (2 GB GDDR5) | One M.2 x4 Drive | Gigabit Ethernet Intel Wi-Fi 6 AX201 + BT 5.2 (soldered); Optional WWAN M.2 Card (?) | | Anti-glare: 1920 × 1080 IPS; 1920 × 1080 IPS multi-touch (on cell); 3840 × 2160 IPS HDR400 Dolby Vision | m 57Wh | ThinkShutter; One TB3 x2 | |
| T15p Gen 1 | 2020 | 366.5 × 250 × 22.7; 14.43 × 9.84 × 0.89 | 2.07 kg (4.6 lb) | 10th Gen Intel Core i5-10300H (4C8T 2.5/4.5 GHz Turbo) i5-10400H (4C8T 2.6/4.6 GHz Turbo) i7-10750H (6C12T 2.6/5.0 GHz Turbo) i7-10850H (6C12T 2.7/5.1 GHz Turbo) i7-10875H (8C16T 2.3/5.1 GHz Turbo) | Intel WM490 | 64 GB DDR4 — 2933 MHz (2 slots) | Intel UHD Graphics Optional Nvidia GTX 1050 (3 GB GDDR5) | Two M.2 x4 Drives | Gigabit Ethernet Intel Wi-Fi 6 AX201 + BT 5.2 (soldered); Optional WWAN M.2 Card (?) | | Anti-glare: 1920 × 1080 IPS; 1920 × 1080 IPS multi-touch (on-cell); 3840 × 2160 IPS HDR400 Dolby Vision | m 68Wh | ThinkShutter; One TB3 x? | |
| T15g Gen 1 | 2020 | 375.4 × 252.3 × 25.25–32.2; 14.78 × 9.93 × 0.99–1.27 | 2.74 kg (6.0 lb) | 10th Gen Intel Core or Xeon W i5-10400H (4C8T 2.6/4.6 GHz Turbo) i7-10750H (6C12T 2.6/5.0 GHz Turbo) i7-10850H (6C12T 2.7/5.1 GHz Turbo) i7-10875H (8C16T 2.3/5.1 GHz Turbo) i9-10885H (8C16T 2.4/5.3 GHz Turbo) i9-10980HK (8C16T 2.4/5.3 GHz Turbo); W-10855M (6C12T 2.8/5.1 GHz Turbo); W-10885M (8C16T 2.4/5.3 GHz Turbo) | Intel WM490 | 128 GB DDR4 — 2933 MHz ECC (Xeon) or non-ECC (4 slots) | Intel UHD Graphics Nvidia GeForce RTX 2070 SUPER (8 GB GDDR6) or GeForce RTX 2080 SUPER (8 GB GDDR6) | Two M.2 x4 Drives | Gigabit Ethernet - Intel I219-LM (vPro models) or I219-V (non-vPro models) Intel Wi-Fi 6 AX201 (802.11ax 2x2 Wi-Fi + Bluetooth 5.2, M.2 Card); Optional WWAN | | Anti-glare: 1920 × 1080 IPS; 1920 × 1080 IPS multi-touch (on-cell); 3840 × 2160 IPS HDR400 Dolby Vision; 3840 × 2160 OLED | m 94Wh | ThinkShutter; 2 × USB-A 3.2 Gen 1 (one always on); 1 × USB-C 3.2 Gen 1; 2 × TB3 1 × HDMI 2.0 1 × 3.5 mm TRRS combo audio jack 1 × SD card reader | |
Nvidia graphics cards switch with Optimus Technology.

=== 2021 ===
==== T15p Gen 2 ====
Model with Nvidia RTX GPUs known as P15v Gen 2.

==== T15g Gen 2 ====
Model with Nvidia RTX GPUs known as P15 Gen 2.

| Model | Release (US) | Dimensions (mm / in) | Weight ^{(min)} | CPU | Chipset | Memory ^{(max)} | Graphics | Storage | Networking | Audio | Screen | Battery | Other | Operating System |
14"
| T14 Gen 2 (Intel) | Mar 2021 | 329 × 227.5 × 17.9; 12.95 × 8.96 × 0.70 | 1.47–1.58 kg (3.2–3.5 lb) | 11th Gen Intel Core i5-1135G7 (4C8T 2.4/4.2 GHz Turbo) i5-1145G7 (4C8T 2.6/4.4 GHz Turbo) i7-1165G7 (4C8T 2.8/4.7 GHz Turbo) i7-1185G7 (4C8T 3.0/4.8 GHz Turbo) | | 40/48 GB — DDR4 3200 MHz (8/16 GB soldered, 1 slot) | Intel Iris Xe G7; Optional Nvidia GeForce MX450 (2 GB GDDR6) | One M.2 x4 Drive | Gigabit Ethernet Intel Wi-Fi 6E AX210 + BT 5.2 (soldered); Optional WWAN M.2 Card | | 1920 × 1080 IPS Touch; 1920 × 1080 Low Power; 1920 × 1080 IPS PrivacyGuard Touch; 3840 × 2160 IPS HDR400 Dolby Vision | m 50Wh | ThinkShutter; Two TB4 | |
| T14 Gen 2 (AMD) | Mar 2021 | 329 × 227.5 × 17.9; 12.95 × 8.96 × 0.70 | 1.47–1.58 kg (3.2–3.5 lb) | AMD Ryzen PRO 5000; Ryzen 3 PRO 5450U (4C8T 2.6/4.0 GHz Turbo); Ryzen 5 5600U (6C12T 2.3/4.2 GHz Turbo); Ryzen 5 PRO 5650U (6C12T 2.3/4.2 GHz Turbo); Ryzen 7 PRO 5850U (8C16T 1.9/4.4 GHz Turbo) | | 40/48 GB — DDR4 3200 MHz (8/16 GB soldered, 1 slot) | AMD Radeon 7 nm Vega 6 or 7 | One M.2 x4 Drive | Gigabit Ethernet Intel Wi-Fi 6E AX210 + BT 5.2; Optional WWAN M.2 Card | | 1920 × 1080 IPS Touch (on cell); 1920 × 1080 IPS; 1920 × 1080 IPS Low Power; 1920 × 1080 IPS Touch (on cell) Privacy Guard; 3840 × 2160 IPS | m 50Wh | ThinkShutter; Two USB-C 10 Gbps w/DP 1.4 | |
| T14s Gen 2 (Intel) | Jun 2021 | 327.5 × 224 × 16.14; 12.89 × 8.82 × 0.64 | 1.28 kg (2.8 lb) | 11th Gen Intel Core i5-1135G7 (4C8T 2.4/4.2 GHz Turbo) i5-1145G7 (4C8T 2.6/4.4 GHz Turbo) i7-1165G7 (4C8T 2.8/4.7 GHz Turbo) i7-1185G7 (4C8T 3.0/4.8 GHz Turbo) | | 8/16/32 GB — LPDDR4x 4266 MHz (soldered) | Intel Iris Xe G7 | One M.2 x4 Drive | Mini Gigabit Ethernet Intel Wi-Fi 6E AX210 + BT 5.2 (soldered); Optional WWAN M.2 Card | | 1920 × 1080 IPS 300 nits 1920 × 1080 IPS 400 nits 1920 × 1080 IPS 300 nits multi-touch 1920 × 1080 IPS 500 nits multi-touch 3840 × 2160 IPS HDR400 Dolby Vision | m 57 Wh | ThinkShutter; Two TB4 | |
| T14s Gen 2 (AMD) | Jun 2021 | 327.5 × 224 × 16.14; 12.89 × 8.82 × 0.64 | 1.28 kg (2.8 lb) | AMD Ryzen PRO 5000; Ryzen 3 PRO 5450U (4C8T 2.6/4.0 GHz Turbo); Ryzen 5 5600U (6C12T 2.3/4.2 GHz Turbo); Ryzen 5 PRO 5650U (6C12T 2.3/4.2 GHz Turbo); Ryzen 7 5800U (8C16T 1.9/4.4 GHz Turbo); Ryzen 7 PRO 5850U (8C16T 1.9/4.4 GHz Turbo) | | 8/16/32 GB — LPDDR4x 4266 MHz (soldered) | AMD Radeon 7 nm Vega 6 or 7 | One M.2 x4 Drive | Mini Gigabit Ethernet Intel Wi-Fi 6E AX210 + BT 5.2; Optional WWAN M.2 Card | | 1920 × 1080 IPS 300 nits 1920 × 1080 IPS 400 nits 1920 × 1080 IPS 300 nits multi-touch 1920 × 1080 IPS 500 nits multi-touch 3840 × 2160 IPS HDR400 Dolby Vision | m 57 Wh | ThinkShutter; Two USB-C 10 Gbps w/DP 1.4 | |
15"
| T15 Gen 2 | Mar 2021 | 365.8 × 248 × 19.1; 14.40 × 9.76 × 0.75 | 1.75–1.84 kg (3.9–4.1 lb) | 11th Gen Intel Core i5-1135G7 (4C8T 2.4/4.2 GHz Turbo) i5-1145G7 (4C8T 2.6/4.4 GHz Turbo) i7-1165G7 (4C8T 2.8/4.7 GHz Turbo) i7-1185G7 (4C8T 3.0/4.8 GHz Turbo) | | 40/48 GB — DDR4 3200 MHz (8/16 GB soldered, 1 slot) | Intel Iris Xe G7; Optional Nvidia GeForce MX450 (2 GB GDDR6) | One M.2 x4 Drive | Gigabit Ethernet Intel Wi-Fi 6E AX210 + BT 5.2 (soldered); Optional WWAN M.2 Card | | 1920 × 1080 IPS; 1920 × 1080 IPS Touch 3840 × 2160 IPS HDR400 Dolby Vision | m 57 Wh | ThinkShutter; Two TB4 | |
| T15p Gen 2 | 2021 | 366.5 × 250 × 22.7; 14.43 × 9.84 × 0.89 | 2.07 kg (4.6 lb) | 11th Gen Intel Core i5-11400H i5-11500H i7-11800H i7-11850H | | 64 GB DDR4 — 3200 MHz (2 slots) | Intel UHD Graphics Optional Nvidia GTX 1650 (4 GB GDDR6) | Two M.2 x4 Drives | Gigabit Ethernet; Intel Wi-Fi 6E AX201 + BT 5.1 (soldered) Optional WWAN M.2 Card | | Anti-glare: 1920 × 1080 IPS; 1920 × 1080 IPS multi-touch (on-cell); 3840 × 2160 IPS HDR400 Dolby Vision | m 68 Wh | ThinkShutter; One TB4 | |
| T15g Gen 2 | Sep 2021 | 375.4 × 252.3 × 24.5–31.45; 14.78 × 9.93 × 0.96–1.24 | 2.87–3.07 kg (6.3–6.8 lb) | 11th Gen Intel Core i5-11500H i7-11800H i7-11850H i9-11950H; Xeon W-11855M Xeon W-11955M | | 128 GB DDR4 — 3200 MHz (4 slots) | Intel UHD Graphics Nvidia GeForce RTX 3070 (8 GB GDDR6) or GeForce RTX 3080 (16 GB GDDR6) | Three M.2 x4 Drives | Gigabit Ethernet - Intel I219-LM (vPro models) or I219-V (non-vPro models) Intel Wi-Fi 6 AX210 (802.11ax 2x2 Wi-Fi + Bluetooth 5.1); Optional WWAN | | Anti-glare: 1920 × 1080 IPS; 3840 × 2160 IPS HDR400 Dolby Vision; 3840 × 2160 IPS Touch True Black | m 94 Wh | ThinkShutter; Two TB4 | |
Nvidia graphics cards switch with Optimus Technology.

=== 2022 ===
==== T15p Gen 3 ====
Model with Nvidia RTX GPUs known as P15v Gen 3.

==== T16 Gen 1 (AMD) ====
| Model | Release (US) | Dimensions (mm / in) | Weight ^{(min)} | CPU | Chipset | Memory ^{(max)} | Graphics | Storage | Networking | Audio | Screen | Battery | Other | Operating System |
14"
| T14 Gen 3 (Intel) | Feb 2022 | 317.7 × 226.9 × 17.9; 12.51 × 8.93 × 0.70 | 1.36–1.54 kg (3.0–3.4 lb) | 12th Gen Intel Core i5-1235U (2C4T 1.3/4.4 GHz Turbo + 8C8T 0.9/3.3 GHz Turbo) i5-1245U (2C4T 1.6/4.4 GHz Turbo + 8C8T 1.2/3.3 GHz Turbo) i7-1255U (2C4T 1.7/4.7 GHz Turbo + 8C8T 1.2/3.5 GHz Turbo) i7-1265U (2C4T 1.8/4.8 GHz Turbo + 8C8T 1.3/3.6 GHz Turbo) i5-1240P (4C8T 1.7/4.4 GHz Turbo + 8C8T 1.2/3.3 GHz Turbo) i5-1250P (4C8T 1.7/4.4 GHz Turbo + 8C8T 1.2/3.3 GHz Turbo) i7-1260P (4C8T 2.1/4.7 GHz Turbo + 8C8T 1.5/3.4 GHz Turbo) i7-1270P (4C8T 2.2/4.8 GHz Turbo + 8C8T 1.6/3.5 GHz Turbo) i7-1280P (6C12T 1.8/4.8 GHz Turbo + 8C8T 1.3/3.6 GHz Turbo) | | 40/48 GB — DDR4 3200 MHz (8/16 GB soldered, 1 slot) | Intel Iris Xe; Optional Nvidia GeForce MX550 (2 GB GDDR6) | One M.2 x4 Drive | Gigabit Ethernet Intel Wi-Fi 6E AX211 + BT 5.2 (soldered); Optional WWAN M.2 Card | | 1920 × 1200 300 nits 1920 × 1200 Low power 400 nits 1920 × 1200 Touch (on cell), 300 nits 1920 × 1200 Touch (on cell), 500 nits 2240 × 1400 300 nits 3840 × 2400 Touch (add on), 500 nits | m 39.3Wh; 52.5Wh | ThinkShutter; Two TB4 | |
| T14 Gen 3 (AMD) | Feb 2022 | 317.7 × 226.9 × 17.9; 12.51 × 8.93 × 0.70 | 1.36–1.54 kg (3.0–3.4 lb) | AMD Ryzen PRO; Ryzen 5 PRO 6650U (6C12T 2.9/4.5 GHz Turbo); Ryzen 7 PRO 6850U (8C16T 2.7/4.7 GHz Turbo) | | 8/16/32 GB — LPDDR5 6400 MHz (fully soldered) | AMD Radeon 660M/680M | One M.2 x4 Drive | Gigabit Ethernet Intel Wi-Fi 6E AX211 + BT 5.2 (soldered); Optional WWAN M.2 Card | | 1920 × 1200 300 nits 1920 × 1200 Low power 400 nits 1920 × 1200 Touch (on cell), 300 nits 1920 × 1200 Touch (on cell), 500 nits 2240 × 1400 300 nits 3840 × 2400 Touch (add on), 500 nits | m 39.3Wh; 52.5Wh | ThinkShutter; Two USB-C 10 Gbps w/DP 1.4 | |
| T14s Gen 3 (Intel) | Jul 2022 | 317.5 × 226.9 × 16.9; 12.50 × 8.93 × 0.67 | 1.21–1.45 kg (2.7–3.2 lb) | 12th Gen Intel Core i5-1235U (2C4T 1.3/4.4 GHz Turbo + 8C8T 0.9/3.3 GHz Turbo) i5-1245U (2C4T 1.6/4.4 GHz Turbo + 8C8T 1.2/3.3 GHz Turbo) i7-1255U (2C4T 1.7/4.7 GHz Turbo + 8C8T 1.2/3.5 GHz Turbo) i7-1265U (2C4T 1.8/4.8 GHz Turbo + 8C8T 1.3/3.6 GHz Turbo) i5-1240P (4C8T 1.7/4.4 GHz Turbo + 8C8T 1.2/3.3 GHz Turbo) i5-1250P (4C8T 1.7/4.4 GHz Turbo + 8C8T 1.2/3.3 GHz Turbo) i7-1260P (4C8T 2.1/4.7 GHz Turbo + 8C8T 1.5/3.4 GHz Turbo) i7-1270P (4C8T 2.2/4.8 GHz Turbo + 8C8T 1.6/3.5 GHz Turbo) i7-1280P (6C12T 1.8/4.8 GHz Turbo + 8C8T 1.3/3.6 GHz Turbo) | | 8/16/32 GB — LPDDR5 4800 MHz (fully soldered) | Intel Iris Xe | One M.2 x4 Drive | No Onboard Ethernet Intel Wi-Fi 6E AX211 + BT 5.1 (soldered); Optional WWAN M.2 Card | | 1920 × 1200 300 nits 1920 × 1200 Low power 400 nits 1920 × 1200 Touch (on cell), 300 nits 1920 × 1200 Touch (on cell), 500 nits 2240 × 1400 300 nits 2880 × 1800 OLED DisplayHDR 500 nits | m 57Wh | ThinkShutter; Two TB4 | |
| T14s Gen 3 (AMD) | Jul 2022 | 317.5 × 226.9 × 16.9; 12.50 × 8.93 × 0.67 | 1.21–1.45 kg (2.7–3.2 lb) | AMD Ryzen PRO 6000; Ryzen 5 PRO 6650U (6C12T 2.9/4.5 GHz Turbo); Ryzen 7 PRO 6850U (8C16T 2.7/4.7 GHz Turbo) | | 8/16/32 GB — LPDDR5 6400 MHz (fully soldered) | AMD Radeon 660M/680M | One M.2 x4 Drive | No Onboard Ethernet Intel Wi-Fi 6E AX211 + BT 5.1 (soldered); Optional WWAN M.2 Card | | 1920 × 1200 300 nits 1920 × 1200 Low power 400 nits 1920 × 1200 Touch (on cell), 300 nits 1920 × 1200 Touch (on cell), 500 nits 2240 × 1400 300 nits 2880 × 1800 OLED DisplayHDR 500 nits | m 57Wh | ThinkShutter; One USB4 w/DP 1.4; One USB-C 10 Gbps w/DP 1.4 | |
15"
| T15p Gen 3 | Jan 2022 | 366.5 × 250 × 22.7; 14.43 × 9.84 × 0.89 | 2.226 kg (4.91 lb) | 12th Gen Intel Core i7-12800H i7-12700H | | 64 GB DDR5 — 4800 MHz (2 slots) | Intel Iris Xe Optional Nvidia RTX 3050 (4 GB GDDR6) | Two M.2 x4 Drives | Gigabit Ethernet Intel Wi-Fi 6E AX211 + BT 5.3 (soldered); Optional WWAN M.2 Card | | Anti-glare: 1920 × 1080 IPS; 1920 × 1080 IPS multi-touch (on-cell); 3840 × 2160 IPS HDR400 Dolby Vision | m 68 Wh | ThinkShutter; One TB4 | |
16"
| T16 Gen 1 (Intel) | Sep 2022 | 361.9 × 255.5 × 20.5; 14.25 × 10.06 × 0.81 | 1.803–1.842 kg (3.97–4.06 lb) | 12th Gen Intel Core i5-1235U (2C4T 1.3/4.4 GHz Turbo + 8C8T 0.9/3.3 GHz Turbo) i5-1245U (2C4T 1.6/4.4 GHz Turbo + 8C8T 1.2/3.3 GHz Turbo) i7-1255U (2C4T 1.7/4.7 GHz Turbo + 8C8T 1.2/3.5 GHz Turbo) i7-1265U (2C4T 1.8/4.8 GHz Turbo + 8C8T 1.3/3.6 GHz Turbo) i5-1240P (4C8T 1.7/4.4 GHz Turbo + 8C8T 1.2/3.3 GHz Turbo) i5-1250P (4C8T 1.7/4.4 GHz Turbo + 8C8T 1.2/3.3 GHz Turbo) i7-1260P (4C8T 2.1/4.7 GHz Turbo + 8C8T 1.5/3.4 GHz Turbo) i7-1270P (4C8T 2.2/4.8 GHz Turbo + 8C8T 1.6/3.5 GHz Turbo) i7-1280P (6C12T 1.8/4.8 GHz Turbo + 8C8T 1.3/3.6 GHz Turbo) | | 40/48 GB — DDR4 3200 MHz (8/16 GB soldered, 1 slot) | Intel Iris Xe; Optional Nvidia GeForce MX550 (2 GB GDDR6) | One M.2 x4 Drive | Gigabit Ethernet Intel Wi-Fi 6E AX211 + BT 5.2 (soldered); Optional WWAN M.2 Card | | 1920 × 1200 300 nits 1920 × 1200 Low power 400 nits 1920 × 1200 Touch (on cell), 300 nits 1920 × 1200 Touch (on cell), 500 nits 2560 × 1600 300 nits | m 52.5Wh; 86Wh | ThinkShutter; Two TB4 | |
| T16 Gen 1 (AMD) | Sep 2022 | 361.9 × 255.5 × 20.5; 14.25 × 10.06 × 0.81 | 1.803–1.842 kg (3.97–4.06 lb) | AMD Ryzen PRO 6000; Ryzen 5 PRO 6650U (6C12T 2.9/4.5 GHz Turbo); Ryzen 7 PRO 6850U (8C16T 2.7/4.7 GHz Turbo) | | 8/16/32 GB — LPDDR5 6400 MHz (fully soldered) | AMD Radeon 680M | One M.2 x4 Drive | Gigabit Ethernet Intel Wi-Fi 6E AX211 + BT 5.2 (soldered); Optional WWAN M.2 Card | | 1920 × 1200 300 nits 1920 × 1200 Low power 400 nits 1920 × 1200 Touch (on cell), 300 nits 1920 × 1200 Touch (on cell), 500 nits 2560 × 1600 300 nits | m 52.5Wh; 86Wh | ThinkShutter; Two USB-C 10 Gbps w/DP 1.4 | |
Nvidia graphics cards switch with Optimus Technology.

=== 2023 ===
==== T16 Gen 2 (AMD) ====
| Model | Release (US) | Dimensions (mm / in) | Weight ^{(min)} | CPU | Chipset | Memory ^{(max)} | Graphics | Storage | Networking | Audio | Screen | Battery | Other | Operating System |
14"
| T14 Gen 4 (Intel) | May 2023 | 317.7 × 226.9 × 17.9; 12.51 × 8.93 × 0.70 | 1.32–1.42 kg (2.9–3.1 lb) | 13th Gen Intel Core i5-1335U i5-1345U i5-1340P i5-1350P i7-1355U i7-1365U i7-1360P i7-1370P | | 40 GB DDR4 3200 MHz (8 GB soldered, 1 slot) Integrated GFX 32 GB DDR5 4800 MHz (16 GB soldered, 1 slot) Integrated GFX 16/32 GB LPDDR5x 6400 MHz (soldered) Discrete GFX | Intel Iris Xe; Optional Nvidia Geforce MX550 (4GB GDDR6) | One M.2 x4 Drive | Gigabit Ethernet Intel Wi-Fi 6E AX211; QC Wi-Fi 6E NFA725A + BT 5.1 / 5.3 HW ready (soldered) Optional WWAN M.2 Card | | 1920 × 1200 IPS 300 nits 1920 × 1200 IPS Low power 400 nits 1920 × 1200 IPS Touch 300 nits 1920 × 1200 IPS Touch Privacy Guard 500 nits 2240 × 1400 IPS 300 nits 2880 × 1800 OLED DisplayHDR, 400 nits | m 39.3Wh; 52.5Wh | ThinkShutter; Two TB4 | Windows 11 Pro; Windows 11 Home; Windows 11 Home Single Language; Windows 11 DG Windows 10 Pro 64; Ubuntu Linux; Linux |
| T14 Gen 4 (AMD) | July 2023 | 317.7 × 226.9 × 17.9; 12.51 × 8.93 × 0.70 | 1.34–1.42 kg (3.0–3.1 lb) | AMD Ryzen PRO 7040; Ryzen 5 PRO 7540U (6C12T 3.2/4.9 GHz Turbo); Ryzen 7 PRO 7840U (8C16T 3.3/5.1 GHz Turbo) | | 8 GB — LPDDR5 6400 MHz 16/32 GB LPDDR5x 6400 MHz (soldered) | AMD Radeon 740M / 780M | One M.2 x4 Drive | Gigabit Ethernet MT Wi-Fi 6E RZ616; QC Wi-Fi 6E NFA725A + BT 5.1(soldered) Optional WWAN M.2 Card | | 1920 × 1200 IPS 300 nits 1920 × 1200 IPS Low power 400 nits 1920 × 1200 IPS Touch 300 nits 1920 × 1200 IPS Touch Privacy Guard 500 nits 2240 × 1400 IPS 300 nits 2880 × 1800 OLED DisplayHDR, 400 nits | m 39.3Wh; 52.5Wh | ThinkShutter One USB4; One USB-C 3.2 Gen 2 10 Gbps | |
| T14s Gen 4 (Intel) | May 2023 | 317.5 × 226.9 × 16.9; 12.50 × 8.93 × 0.67 | 1.25–1.48 kg (2.8–3.3 lb) | 13th Gen Intel Core i5-1335U i5-1345U i5-1340P i5-1350P i7-1355U i7-1365U i7-1360P i7-1370P | | 16/32 GB LPDDR5x 6400 MHz (soldered) | Intel Iris Xe | One M.2 x4 Drive | No Onboard Ethernet Intel Wi-Fi 6E AX211 + BT 5.2 (soldered); Optional WWAN M.2 Card | | 1920 × 1200 IPS 300 nits 1920 × 1200 IPS Low power 400 nits 1920 × 1200 IPS Touch 300 nits 1920 × 1200 IPS Touch Privacy Guard 500 nits 2240 × 1400 IPS 300 nits 2880 × 1800 OLED DisplayHDR 400 nits | m 57Wh | ThinkShutter; Two TB4 | |
| T14s Gen 4 (AMD) | 2023 | 317.5 × 226.9 × 16.9; 12.50 × 8.93 × 0.67 | 1.21–1.47 kg (2.7–3.2 lb) | AMD Ryzen PRO 7040; Ryzen 5 PRO 7540U; Ryzen 7 PRO 7840U | | 16/32 GB LPDDR5x 6400 MHz (soldered) | AMD Radeon 740M / 780M | One M.2 x4 Drive | No Onboard Ethernet MT Wi-Fi 6E RZ616; QC Wi-Fi 6E NFA725A + BT 5.1(soldered) Optional WWAN M.2 Card | | 1920 × 1200 IPS 300 nits 1920 × 1200 IPS Low power 400 nits 1920 × 1200 IPS Touch 300 nits 1920 × 1200 IPS Touch Privacy Guard 500 nits 2240 × 1400 IPS 300 nits 2880 × 1800 OLED DisplayHDR 400 nits | m 57Wh | ThinkShutter; Two USB4 | |
16"
| T16 Gen 2 (Intel) | May 2023 | 361.9 × 255.5 × 20.5; 14.25 × 10.06 × 0.81 | 1.67–1.74 kg (3.7–3.8 lb) | 13th Gen Intel Core i5-1335U i5-1345U i5-1340P i5-1350P i7-1355U i7-1365U i7-1360P i7-1370P | | 40 GB DDR4 3200 MHz (8 GB soldered, 1 slot) Integrated GFX 32 GB DDR5 4800 MHz (16 GB soldered, 1 slot) Integrated GFX 16/32 GB LPDDR5x 6400 MHz (soldered) Discrete GFX | Intel Iris Xe; Optional Nvidia Geforce MX550 (4GB GDDR6) | One M.2 x4 Drive | Gigabit Ethernet Intel Wi-Fi 6E AX211; QC Wi-Fi 6E NFA725A + BT 5.1 / 5.3 HW ready (soldered) Optional WWAN M.2 Card | | 1920 × 1200 IPS 300 nits 1920 × 1200 IPS Low power 400 nits 1920 × 1200 IPS Touch 300 nits 3840 × 2400 OLED DisplayHDR 400 nits | m 52.5Wh; 86Wh | ThinkShutter; Two TB4 | |
| T16 Gen 2 (AMD) | 2023 | 361.9 × 255.5 × 20.5; 14.25 × 10.06 × 0.81 | 1.70–1.85 kg (3.7–4.1 lb) | AMD Ryzen PRO 7040; Ryzen 5 PRO 7540U (6C12T 3.2/4.9 GHz Turbo); Ryzen 7 PRO 7840U (8C16T 3.3/5.1 GHz Turbo) | | 8 GB — LPDDR5 6400 MHz 16/32 GB LPDDR5x 6400 MHz (soldered) | AMD Radeon 740M / 780M | One M.2 x4 Drive | Gigabit Ethernet MT Wi-Fi 6E RZ616; QC Wi-Fi 6E NFA725A + BT 5.1(soldered) Optional WWAN M.2 Card | | 1920 × 1200 IPS 300 nits 1920 × 1200 IPS Low power 400 nits 1920 × 1200 IPS Touch 300 nits 3840 × 2400 OLED DisplayHDR 400 nits | m 52.5Wh; 86Wh | ThinkShutter; One USB4, One USB-C 3.2 Gen 2 10 Gbps | |
Nvidia graphics cards switch with Optimus Technology.

=== 2024 ===
==== T14 Gen 5 (Intel) ====
Introduces Intel Core Ultra 100 Series processors with some graphics configurations including Intel Arc Graphics. The internals were redesigned to allow for two removable SODIMM DDR5 Modules, marking a push for a more repairable design when compared to the previous generations.

==== T14 Gen 5 (AMD) ====
Introduces AMD Ryzen 8040 Series processors with the same integrated graphics as the previous 7040 Series. The internals were redesigned to allow for two removable SODIMM DDR5 Modules, marking a push for a more repairable design when compared to the previous generations.

==== T14s Gen 5 (Intel) ====
Introduces Intel Core Ultra 100 Series processors with some graphics configurations including Intel Arc Graphics.

==== T14s Gen 6 (AMD) ====
Introduces Ryzen AI 300 series processors with updated integrated Radeon Graphics.

==== T14s Gen 6 (Qualcomm) ====
Introduces Qualcomm Snapdragon Series processors with integrated Adreno Graphics. The successor to the ThinkPad X13s.

==== T14S Gen 6 (Intel) ====
The S=slim version of T14 is very similar to thicker T14 Gen 6. Main differences:

T14S has no LAN port. It has less Customer Replaceable Units (CRUs): only battery (58Whr). For example keyboard is not as easy to replace.

T14 became available much later, in summer 2025.

==== T16 Gen 3 ====
Introduces Intel Core Ultra 100 Series processors with some graphics configurations including Intel Arc Graphics. Intel processors were the only configurable processor brand for this generation. The internals were redesigned to allow for two removable SODIMM DDR5 Modules, marking a push for a more repairable design when compared to the previous generations.

| Model | Release (US) | Dimensions (mm / in) | Weight ^{(min)} | CPU | Chipset | Memory ^{(max)} | Graphics | Storage | Networking | Audio | Screen | Battery | Other | Operating System |
14"
| T14 Gen 5 (Intel) | May 2024 | 315.9 × 223.7 × 17.7; 12.44 × 8.81 × 0.70 | 1.31–1.43 kg (2.9–3.2 lb) | Intel Core Ultra 5 125U; 5 135U; 7 155U; 7 165U | | 128 GB DDR5 — 5600 MHz (2 slots) | Intel Arc (H Series); Intel Graphics (U Series) | One M.2 x4 Drive | Gigabit Ethernet Intel Wi-Fi 6E AX211; Intel Wi-Fi 7 BE200 + BT 5.3 / 5.4 HW ready (soldered) Optional WWAN M.2 Card | | 1920 × 1200 400 nits 1920 × 1200 Touch (on cell), 400 nits 1920 × 1200 Low Power, 400 nits 1920 × 1200 Touch (on cell), 500 nits 2240 × 1400 300 nits Intel config only 2880 × 1800 Touch (film), 120Hz VRR, OLED, 400 nits | m 39.3Wh; 52.5Wh | ThinkShutter; Two TB4 | |
| T14 Gen 5 (AMD) | July 2024 | 315.9 × 223.7 × 17.7; 12.44 × 8.81 × 0.70 | 1.37–1.43 kg (3.0–3.2 lb) | AMD Ryzen 5 PRO 8540U; 7 PRO 8840U | | 128 GB DDR5 — 5600 MHz (2 slots) | AMD Radeon 740M / 780M | One M.2 x4 Drive | Gigabit Ethernet QC Wi-Fi 6E NFA725A; QC Wi-Fi 7 NFA825 + BT 5.3 / 5.4 HW ready(soldered) Optional WWAN M.2 Card | | 1920 × 1200 400 nits 1920 × 1200 Touch (on cell), 400 nits 1920 × 1200 Low Power, 400 nits 1920 × 1200 Touch (on cell), 500 nits 2240 × 1400 300 nits Intel config only 2880 × 1800 Touch (film), 120Hz VRR, OLED, 400 nits | m 39.3Wh; 52.5Wh | ThinkShutter; Two USB4 | |
| T14s Gen 5 (Intel) | May 2024 | 313.6 × 219.4 × 16.6; 12.35 × 8.64 × 0.65 | 1.24–1.45 kg (2.7–3.2 lb) | Intel Core Ultra 5 125U; 5 135U; 7 155U; 7 165U | | 16/32/64 GB LPDDR5x 6400 MHz (soldered) | Intel Arc (H Series); Intel Graphics (U Series) | One M.2 x4 Drive | No Onboard Ethernet Intel Wi-Fi 6E AX211; Intel Wi-Fi 7 BE200 + BT 5.3 / 5.4 HW ready (soldered) Optional WWAN M.2 Card | | 1920 × 1200 400 nits 1920 × 1200 Touch (on cell), 400 nits 1920 × 1200 Low Power, 400 nits 1920 × 1200 Touch (on cell), 500 nits 2880 × 1800 Touch (film), 120Hz VRR, OLED, 400 nits | m 58Wh | ThinkShutter; Two TB4 | |
| T14s Gen 6 (AMD) | September 2024 | 313.6 × 219.4 × 16.9; 12.35 × 8.64 × 0.67 | 1.30–1.37 kg (2.9–3.0 lb) | AMD Ryzen AI 5 PRO 340; 7 PRO 350; 7 PRO 360 | | 32/64 GB LPDDR5x 7500 MHz (soldered) | AMD Radeon 840M; 860M; 880M | One M.2 x4 Drive | No Onboard Ethernet Qualcomm Wi-Fi 7 NCM825A + BT 5.3 / 5.4 HW ready(soldered); Optional WWAN M.2 Card | | 1920 × 1200 400 nits 1920 × 1200 Touch (on cell), 400 nits 1920 × 1200 Low Power, 400 nits 1920 × 1200 Touch (on cell), 500 nits 2880 × 1800 Touch (film), 120Hz VRR, OLED, 400 nits | m 58Wh | ThinkShutter; Two TB4 | |
| T14s Gen 6 (Qualcomm) | May 2024 | 313.6 × 219.4 × 16.9; 12.35 × 8.64 × 0.67 | 1.24–1.24 kg (2.7–2.7 lb) | Qualcomm; Snapdragon X1E-78-100; X1P-42-100 | | 16/32/64 GB LPDDR5x 8448 MHz (soldered) | Qualcomm Adreno GPU | One M.2 2242 Drive | No Onboard Ethernet Qualcomm Wi-Fi 7 NCM825A + BT 5.3 / 5.4 HW ready(soldered); Optional WWAN M.2 Card | | | m 58Wh | ThinkShutter; Two TB4 | |
16"
| T16 Gen 3 | May 2024 | 359.7 × 250.8 × 19.64; 14.16 × 9.87 × 0.77 | 1.66–1.83 kg (3.7–4.0 lb) | Intel Core Ultra 5 125U; 5 125H 5 135U; 5 135H 7 155U; 7 155H 7 165U; 7 165H | | 128 GB DDR5 — 5600 MHz (2 slots) | Intel Arc (H Series) Intel Graphics (U Series) | One M.2 x4 Drive | Gigabit Ethernet Intel Wi-Fi 6E AX211; Intel Wi-Fi 7 BE200 + BT 5.3 / 5.4 HW ready (soldered) Optional WWAN M.2 Card | | 1920 × 1200 300 nits 1920 × 1200 Low power 400 nits 1920 × 1200 Touch (on cell), 300 nits 1920 × 1200 Touch (on cell), 500 nits 2560 × 1600 300 nits | m 52.5Wh; 86Wh | ThinkShutter; Two TB4 | |

=== 2025 ===
==== T14 Gen 6 (AMD) ====
Introduces Ryzen AI 300 series processors with updated integrated Radeon Graphics.

==== T14 Gen 6 (Intel) ====
Introduces the Intel Core Ultra 200 series processors with integrated Arc Graphics on certain models. Lunar Lake Intel Core Ultra 200V series processors have a physical limitation of 32GB of soldered LPDDR5X RAM, while Meteor Lake Core Ultra 200U and 200H series processors have removable SODIMM RAM that can be upgraded up to 128GB physically

Customer Replaceable Units (CRUs): Battery, Bottom cover (D), Keyboard, Memory, SSD, WWAN.

==== T16 Gen 4 (AMD) ====
Introduces Ryzen AI 300 series processors with updated integrated Radeon Graphics.

==== T16 Gen 4 (Intel) ====
Very similar to T14 Gen 6 (Intel). For example ports on left and right side of the notebook are 100% identical in 14" and 16" models.

But T16 is not sold with Lunar Lake V Series CPUs with soldered RAM, so T16 Gen 4 (Intel) doesn't support CoPilot+, because CoPilot+ requires at least 40 TPU NPU.

| Model | Release (US) | Dimensions (mm / in) | Weight ^{(min)} | CPU | Chipset | Memory ^{(max)} | Graphics | Storage | Networking | Audio | Screen | Battery | Other | Operating System |
14"
| T14 Gen 6 (AMD) | June 2025 | 315.9 × 223.7 × 16.13; 12.44 × 8.81 × 0.64 | 1.38–1.59 kg (3.0–3.5 lb) | AMD Ryzen AI 5 / 7 300 Series 5 PRO 340; 7 PRO 350 | | 128 GB DDR5 — 5600 MHz (2 slots) | AMD Radeon 840M; 860M | One M.2 x4 Drive | Gigabit Ethernet Mediatek Wi-Fi 7 MT7925 Optional WWAN M.2 Card | High Definition (HD) Audio & Realtek ALC3287 with built-in stereo speakers powered by Dolby Audio and dual-microphone array, 360° far-field with Dolby Voice | 1920 × 1200 400 nits 1920 × 1200 Low power 400 nits 1920 × 1200 Touch (on cell), 500 nits 1920 × 1200 Touch (on cell), 500 nits 2560 × 1600 Touch (film), 120Hz VRR, 500 nits | m 52.5Wh; 57Wh | ThinkShutter; Two USB4 | Windows 11 Pro |
| T14 Gen 6 (Intel) | June 2025 | 315.9 × 223.7 × 16.13; 12.44 × 8.81 × 0.64 | 1.38–1.59 kg (3.0–3.5 lb) | Intel Core Ultra 5 225H; 5 225U; 5 228V 5 235H; 5 235U; 5 238V 7 255H; 7 255U; 7 258V 7 265H; 7 265U; 7 268V | | 128 GB DDR5 5600 MHz (2 slots) U or H Series 32 GB LPDDR5x 8533 MHz (Soldered) V Series | Intel Arc 130T; 140T (H Series) 130V; 140v (V Series) Intel Graphics (U Series) | One M.2 x4 Drive | Gigabit Ethernet Intel Wi-Fi 6E AX211 Intel Wi-Fi 7 BE201 Optional WWAN M.2 Card | High Definition (HD) Audio & Realtek ALC3287 with built-in stereo speakers powered by Dolby Audio and dual-microphone array, 360° far-field with Dolby Voice | 1920 × 1200 400 nits 1920 × 1200 Low power 400 nits 1920 × 1200 Touch (on cell), 500 nits 1920 × 1200 Touch (on cell), 500 nits 2560 × 1600 Touch (film), 120Hz VRR, 500 nits | m 52.5Wh; 57Wh | ThinkShutter; Two Thunderbolt 4 | Windows 11 Pro |
16"
| T16 Gen 4 (AMD) | June 2025 | 315.9 × 223.7 × 16.13; 12.44 × 8.81 × 0.64 | 1.76–1.98 kg (3.9–4.4 lb) | AMD Ryzen AI 5 / 7 300 Series 5 PRO 340; 7 PRO 350 | | 128 GB DDR5 — 5600 MHz (2 slots) | AMD Radeon 840M; 860M | One M.2 x4 Drive | Gigabit Ethernet Mediatek Wi-Fi 7 MT7925; Optional WWAN M.2 Card | High Definition (HD) Audio & Realtek ALC3287 with built-in stereo speakers powered by Dolby Audio and dual-microphone array, 360° far-field with Dolby Voice | 1920 × 1200 400 nits 1920 × 1200 Low power 400 nits 1920 × 1200 Touch (on cell), 500 nits 1920 × 1200 Touch (on cell), 500 nits | m 52.5Wh; 86Wh | ThinkShutter; Two USB4 | Windows 11 Pro |
| T16 Gen 4 (Intel) | June 2025 | 359.7 × 250.8 × 18.14; 14.16 × 9.87 × 0.71 | 1.76–1.98 kg (3.9–4.4 lb) | Intel Core Ultra 5 225H; 5 225U 5 235H; 5 235U 7 255H; 7 255U 7 265H; 7 265U | | 128 GB DDR5 5600 MHz (2 slots) U or H Series | Intel Arc 130T; 140T (H Series) Intel Graphics (U Series) | One M.2 x4 Drive | Gigabit Ethernet Intel Wi-Fi 6E AX211 Intel Wi-Fi 7 BE201 Optional WWAN M.2 Card | High Definition (HD) Audio & Realtek ALC3287 with built-in stereo speakers powered by Dolby Audio and dual-microphone array, 360° far-field with Dolby Voice | 1920 × 1200 400 nits 1920 × 1200 Low power 400 nits 1920 × 1200 Touch (on cell), 500 nits 1920 × 1200 Touch (on cell), 500 nits | m 52.5Wh; 86Wh | ThinkShutter; Two Thunderbolt 4 | Windows 11 Pro |

== Reviews ==
PCWorld said that the ThinkPad T20 “packs a bigger screen, a more comfortable keyboard, and a larger set of useful features into a smaller package than any of its competitors.” The Web site epinions.com said that the ThinkPad T20 was “worth the wait” giving it 4.5 stars out of 5.

In a review of the ThinkPad T60, Notebook Review called the T-series laptops the “flagship of the ThinkPad brand”, aimed at corporate professionals. Some of the T-series characteristics as listed by notebookreview.com include durability, security, usability, and performance.

The ThinkPad T410 was awarded 4.5 out of 5 stars by Notebook Review upon release. The review noted the centering of the screen, eliminating the thick bezel on one side and the thin bezel on the other. The review indicated that the pros were the speed, battery life, and wide selection of ports. The cons were minor distortions on the screen when flexed, and the high pitched fan.' WIRED also reviewed the T410 laptop positively, saying that “Lenovo's thoughtful ThinkPad is a near-perfect machine”.

The PC Advisor review of the ThinkPad T510 called the lack of alterations to the traditional design a good thing. It also highlighted the professional appearance and ‘sturdy build quality’, indicating that this makes the laptop stand out from others in the market.

The T420 and T520 laptops were different from their predecessors mainly through an upgrade to Intel's Sandy Bridge processors. The T420 received a total score of 85% from the Notebook Check web site. The fan noise was noticeably reduced, as indicated by a reviewer from PCWorld. The T-series laptops, the T420, the T420s, and the T520, have been lauded for their battery life – up to 30 hours with a 9-cell battery slice.

== Gallery ==
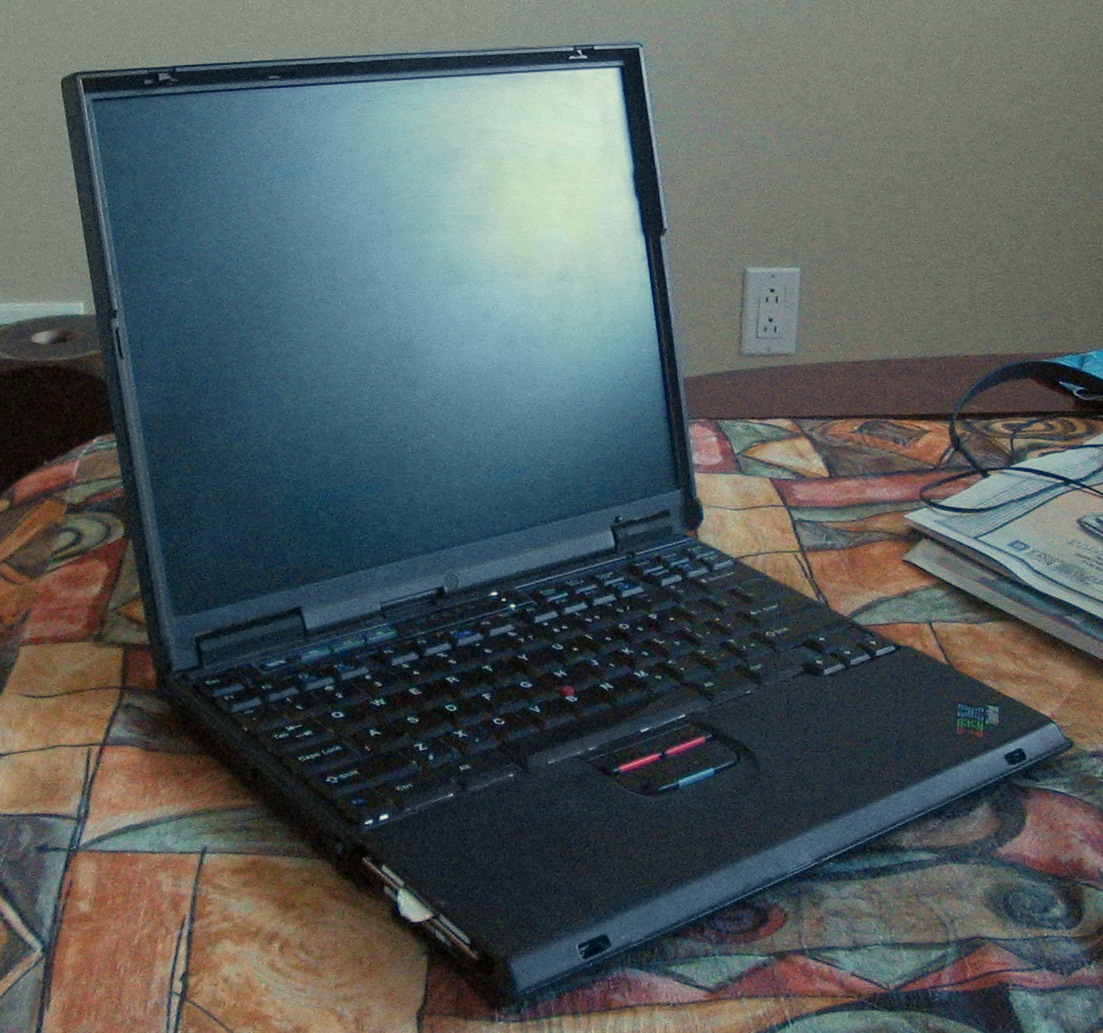
T22 or T23 before the sale to Lenovo

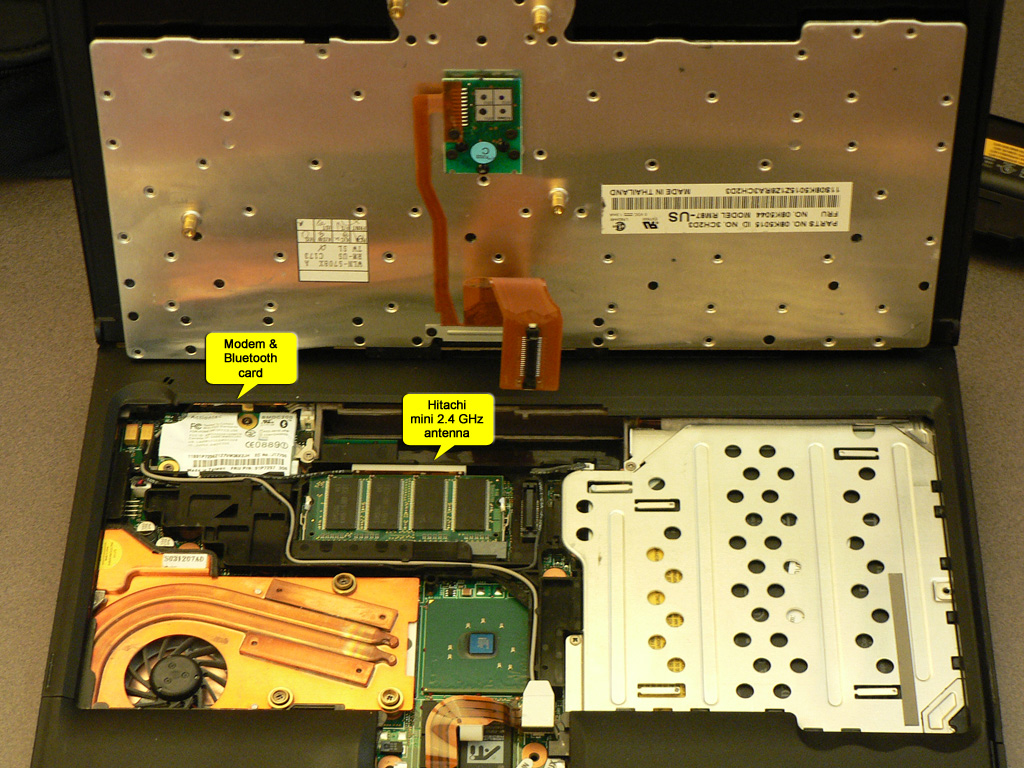
Inside of a T41 with the keyboard removed

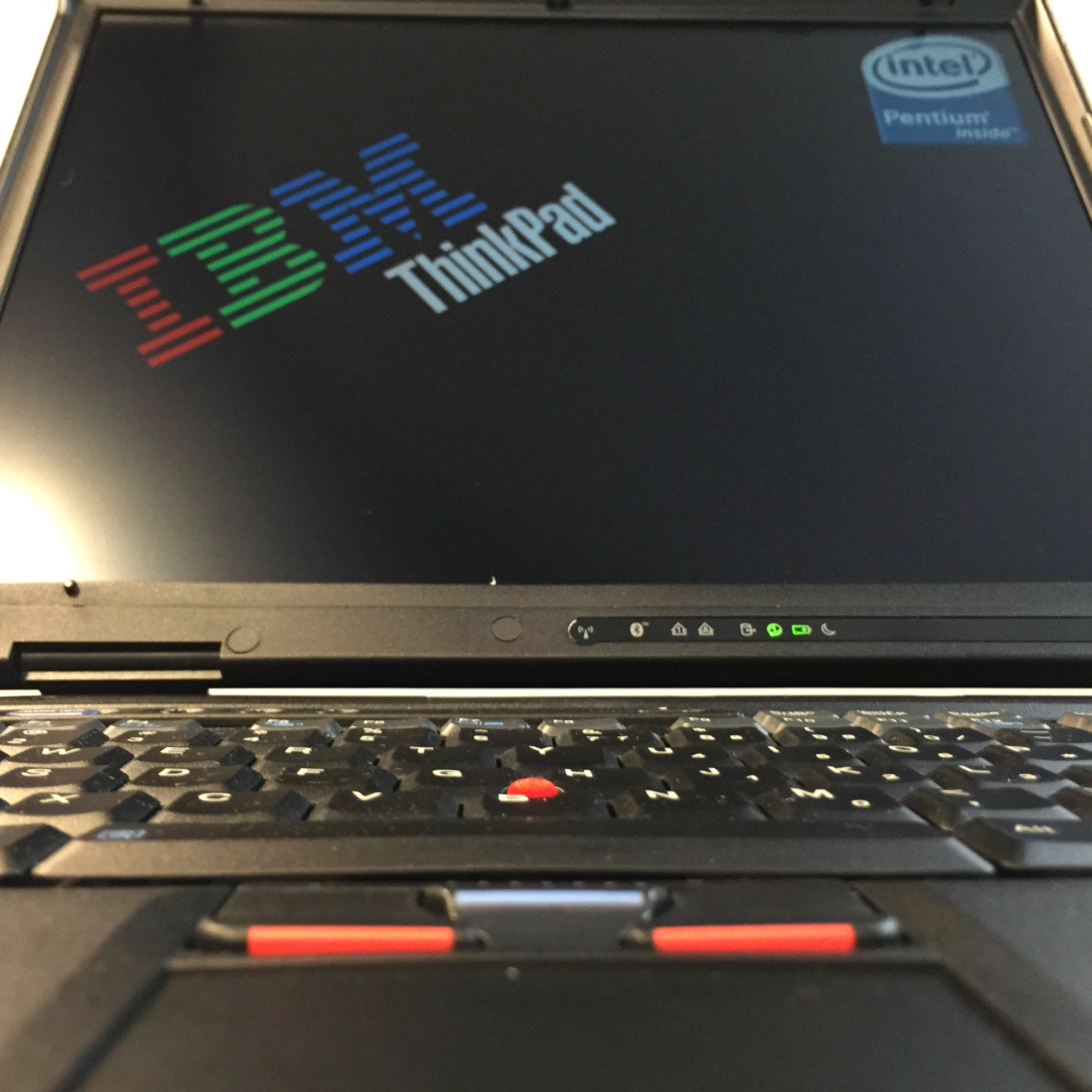
T43p with a BOE-Hydis LED backlit IPS display booting, note the extreme viewing angle

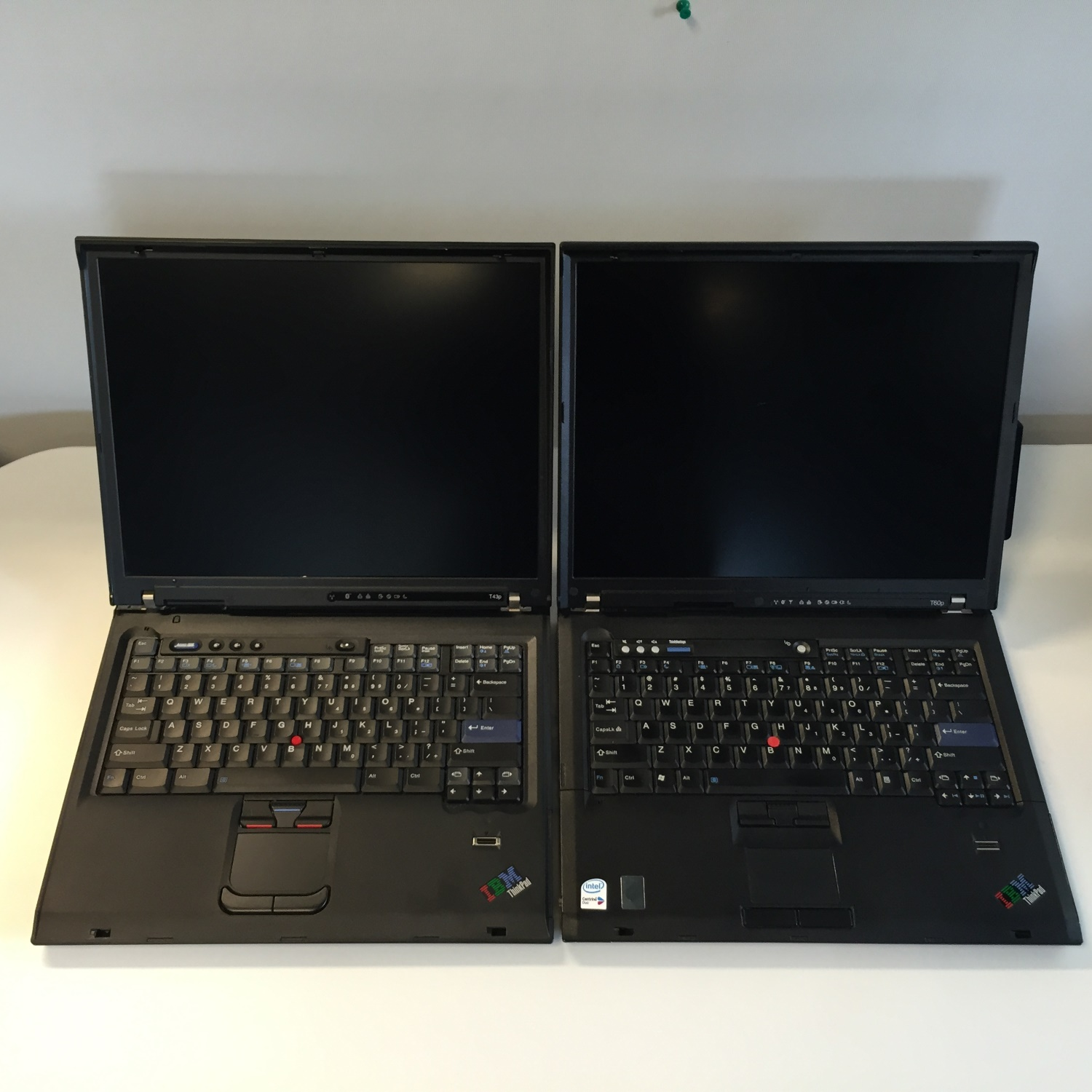
T43p compared against a T60p (both laptops are 15" 4:3)

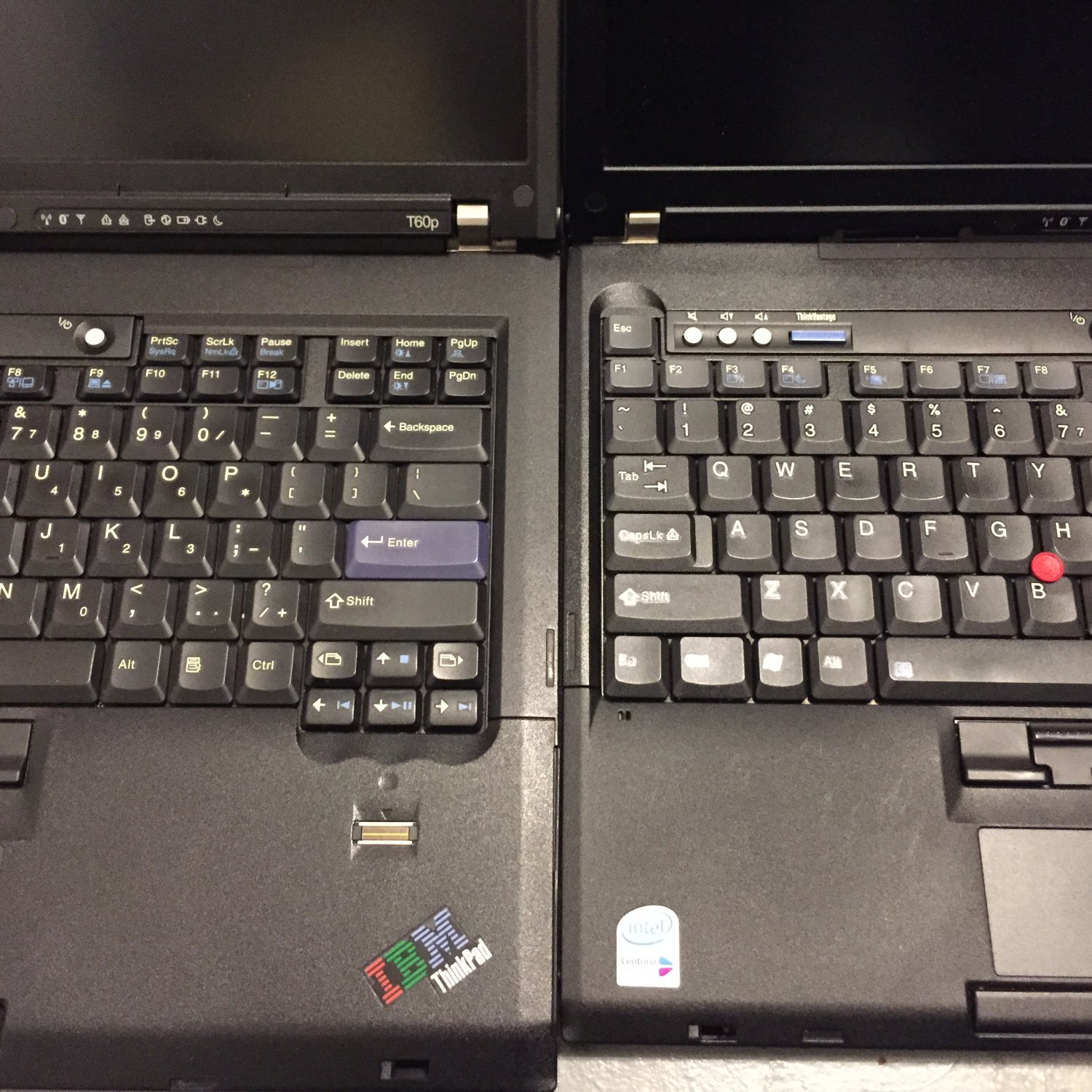
A 15" T60p (left) compared against a 14" one (right)

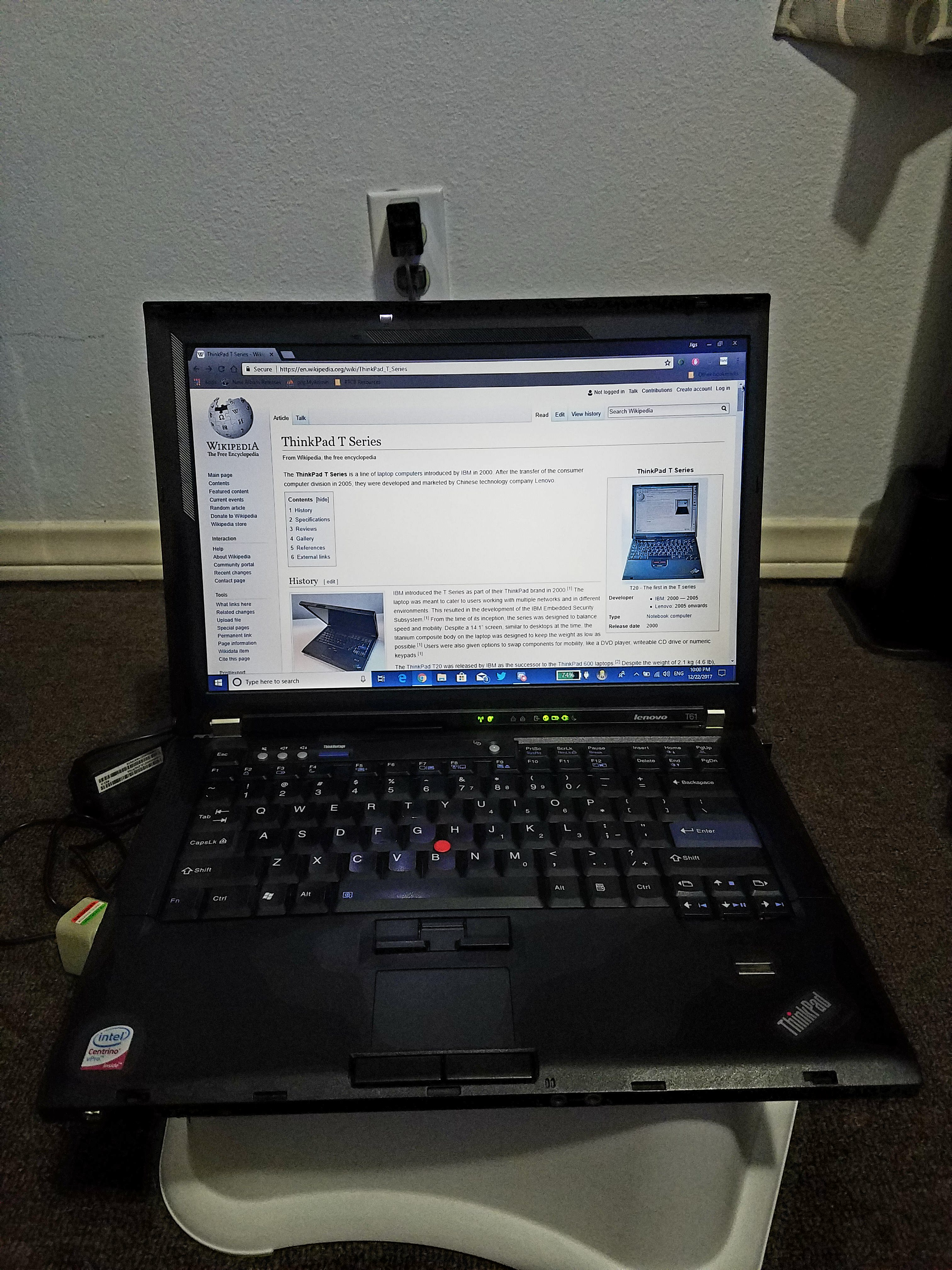
T61 running Windows 10. Note the ThinkLight being switched on.

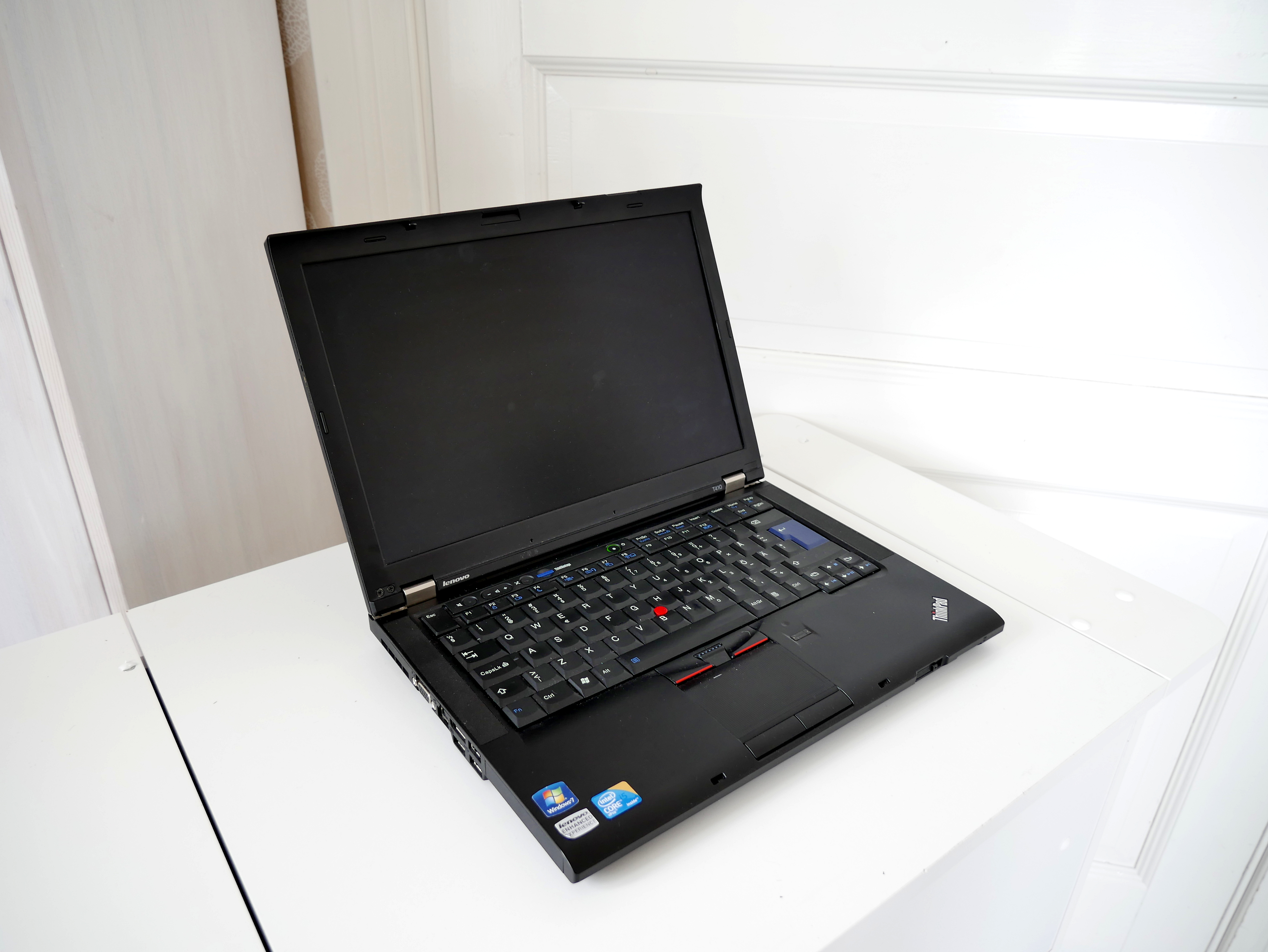
T410

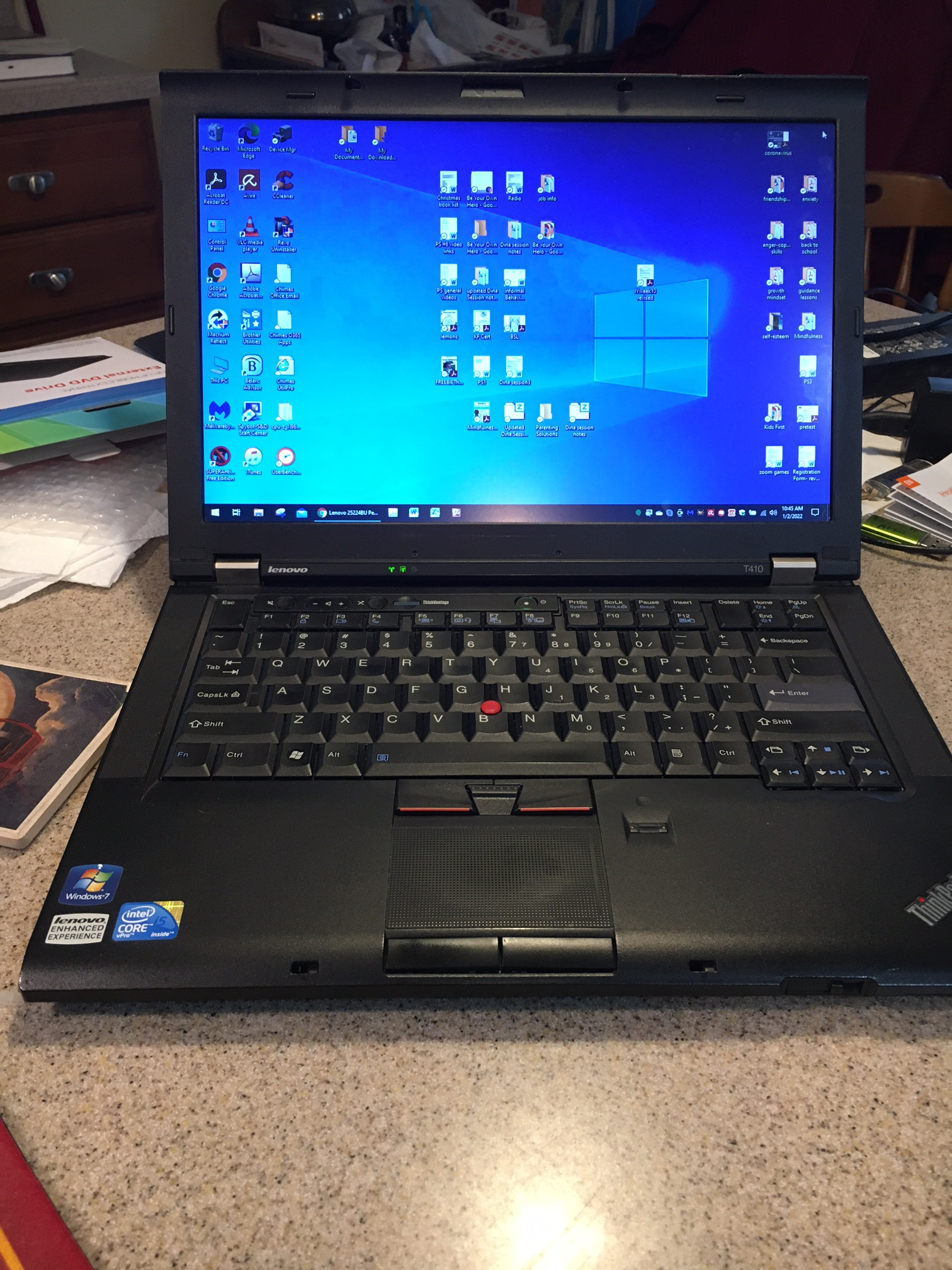
A T410 running Windows 10

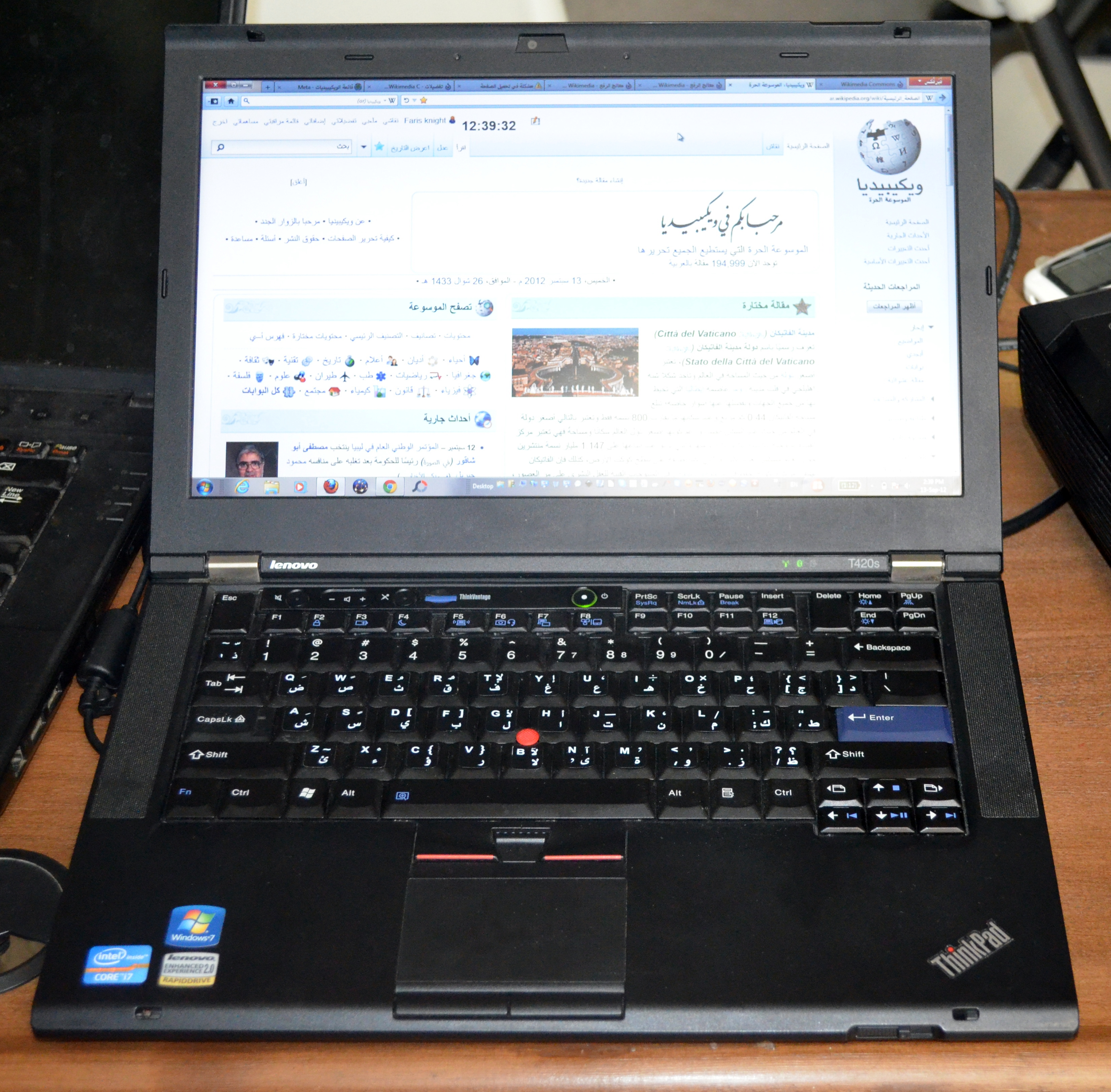
T420s

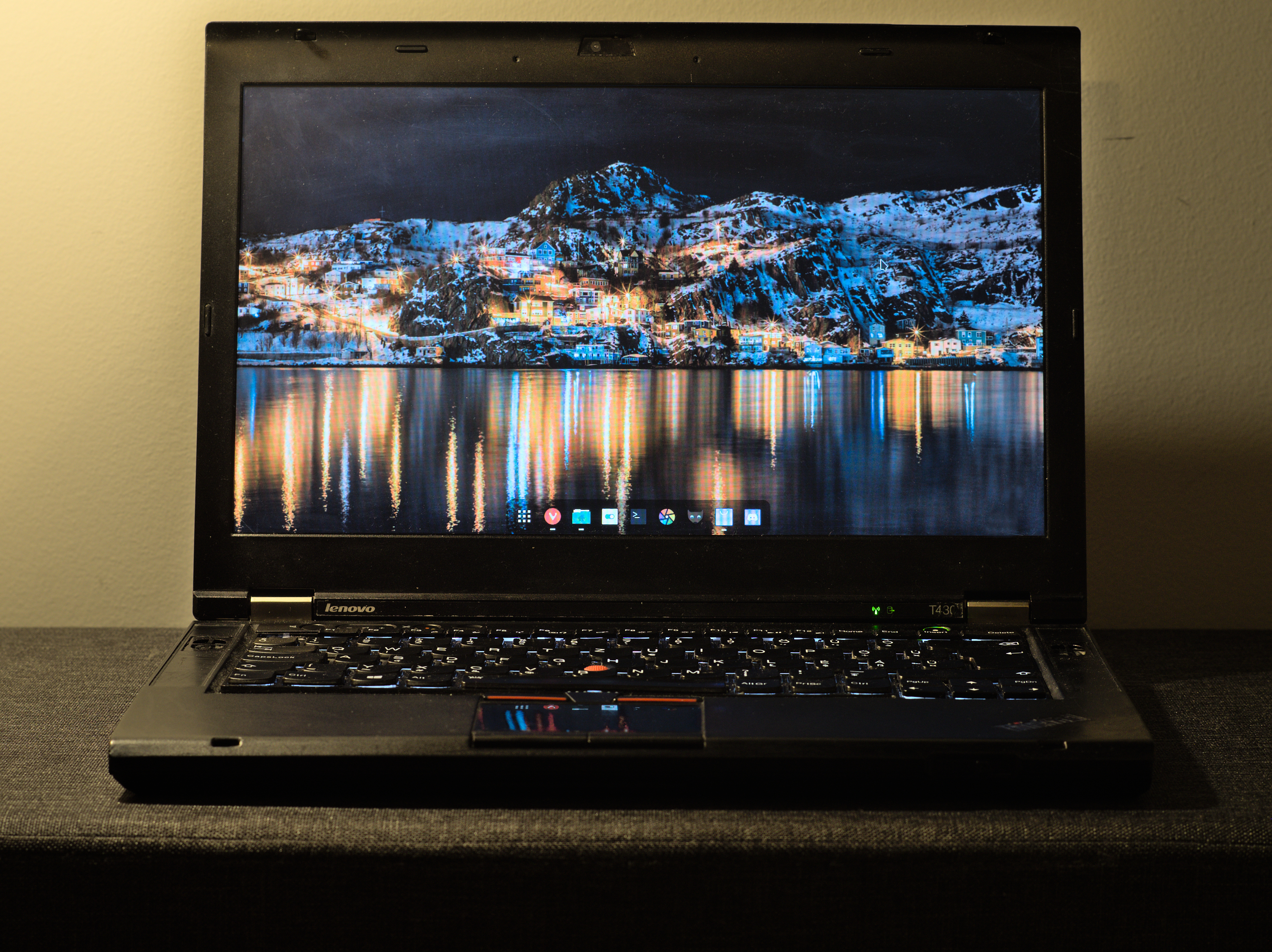
Thinkpad T430 in GNOME

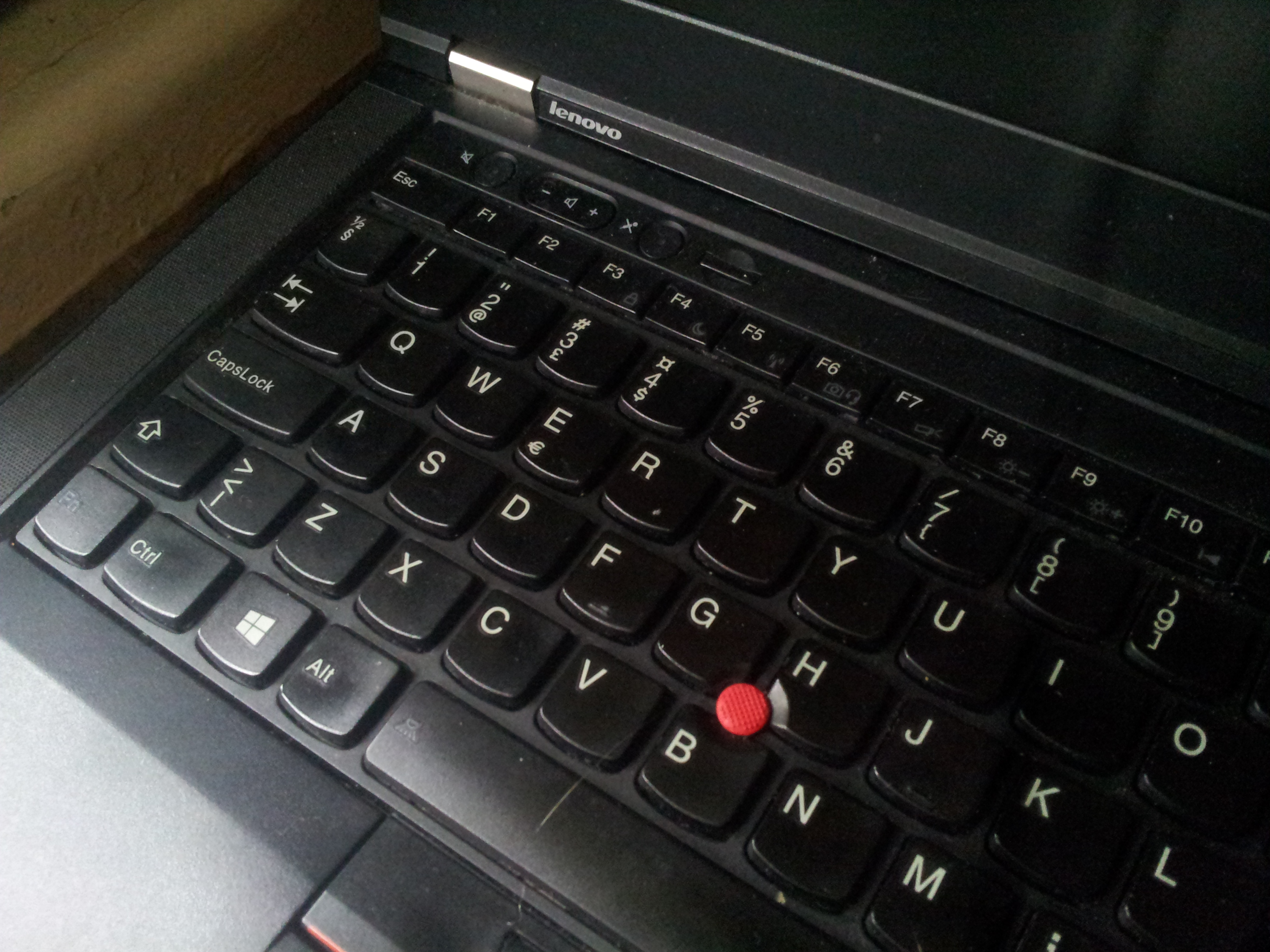
T430 keyboard

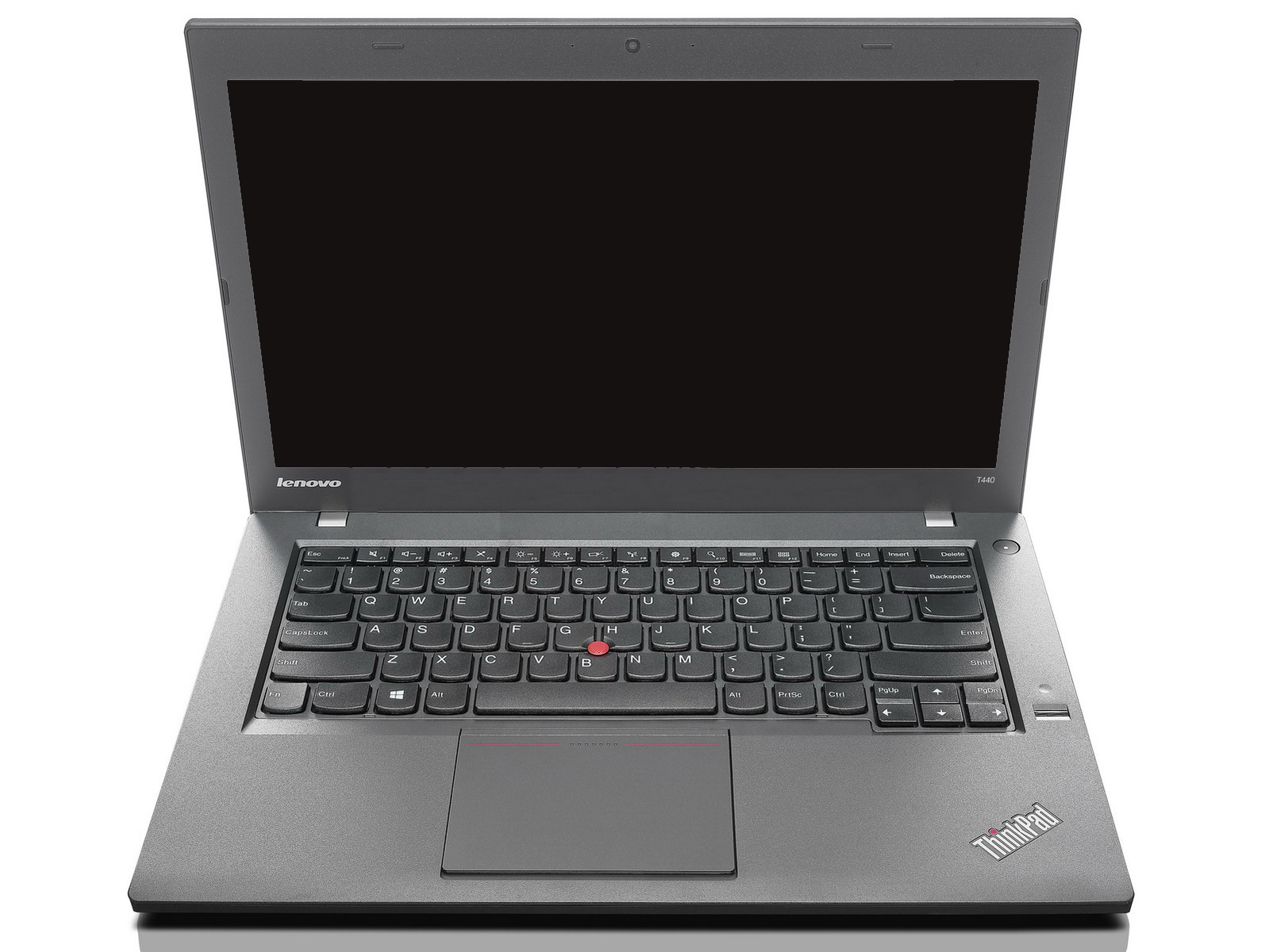
T440

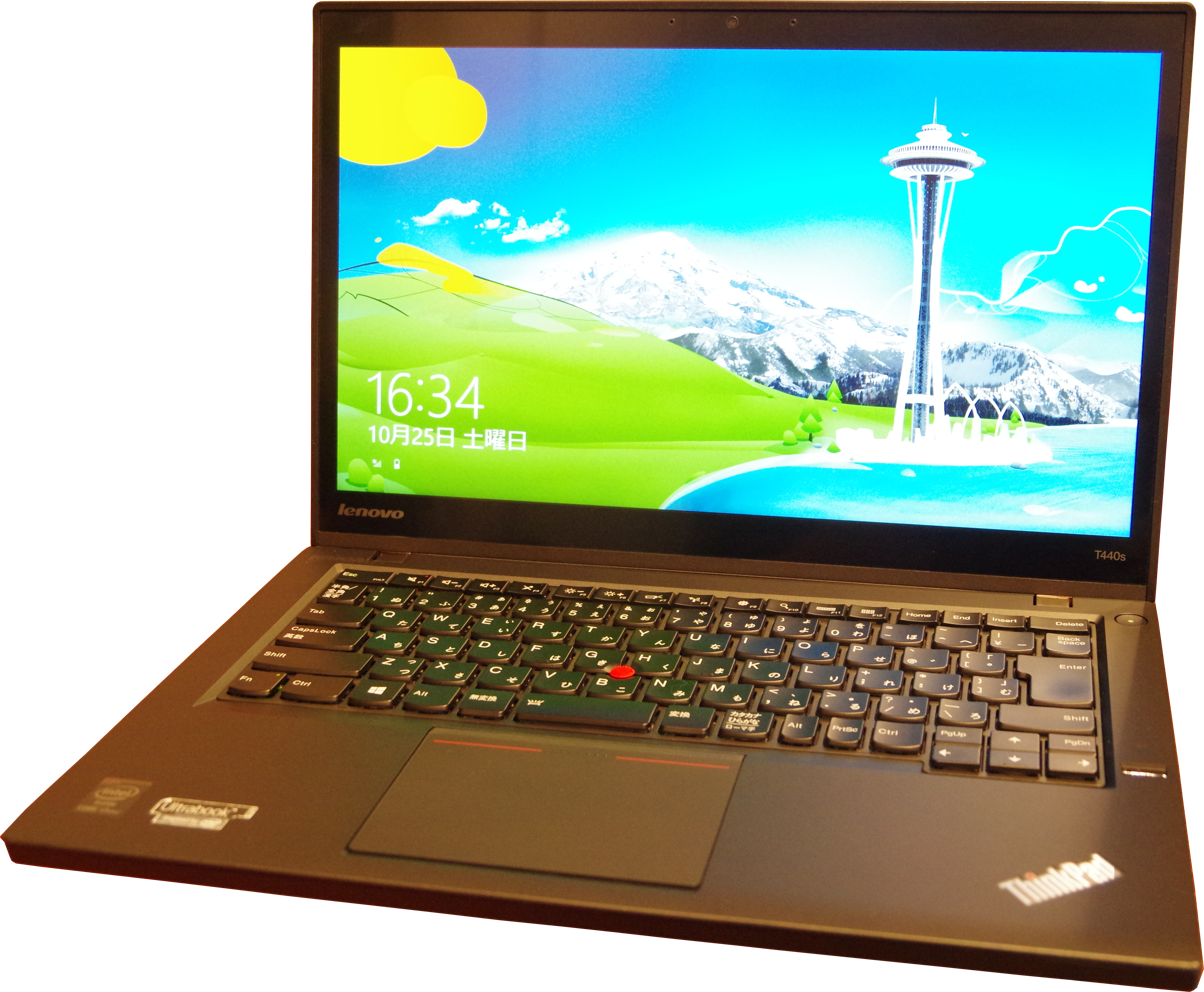
T440s

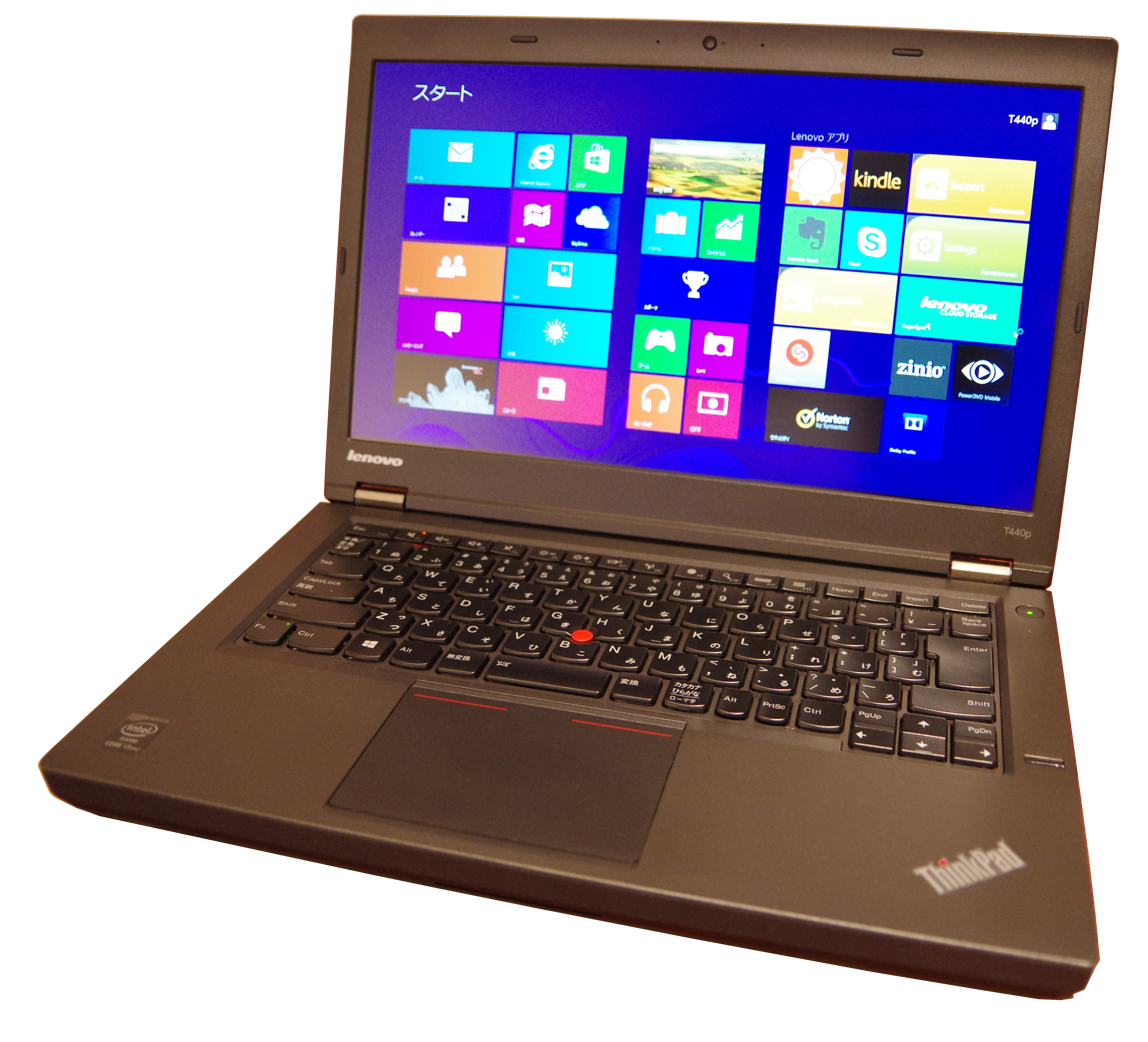
T440p running Windows 8

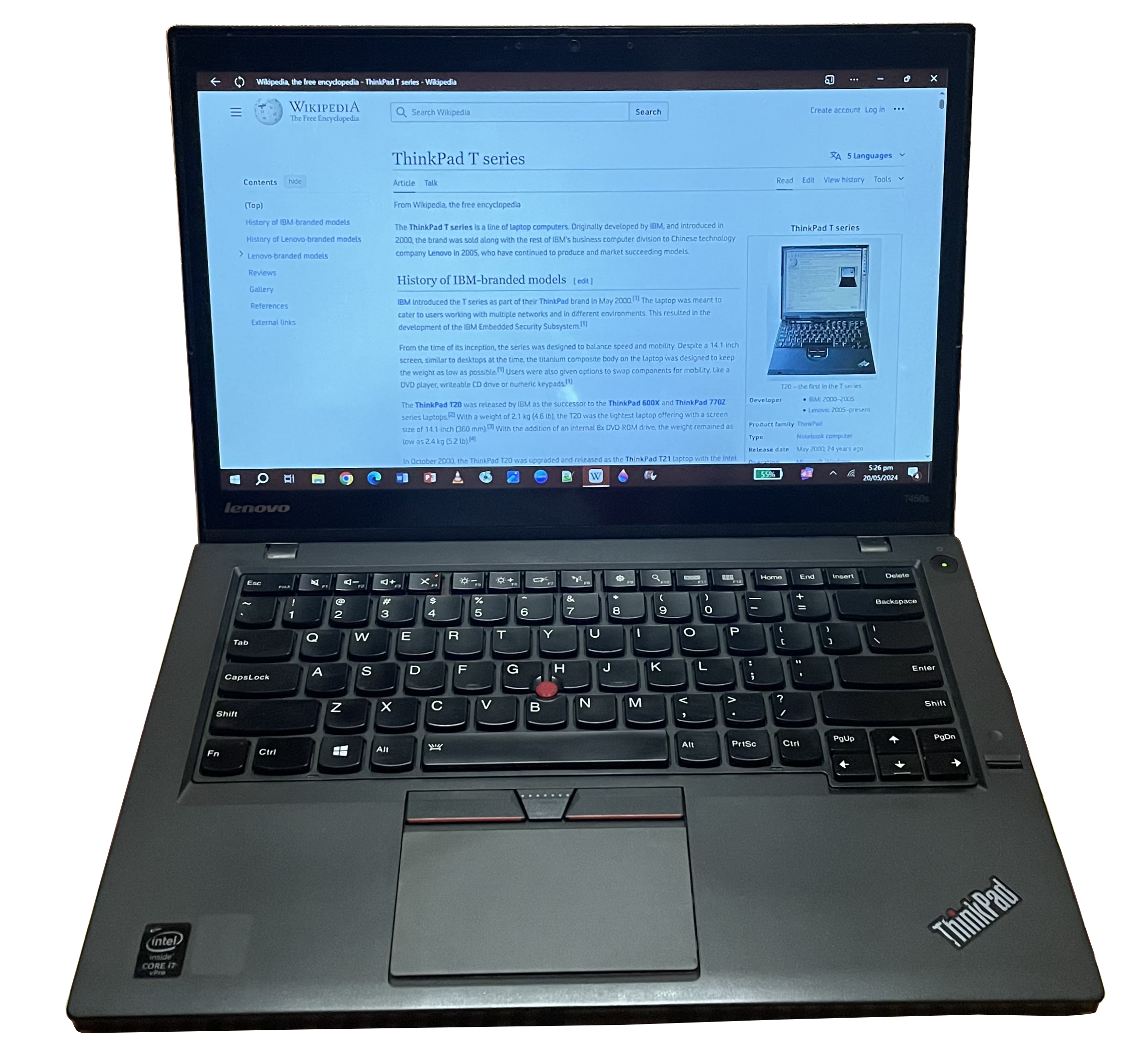
T450s

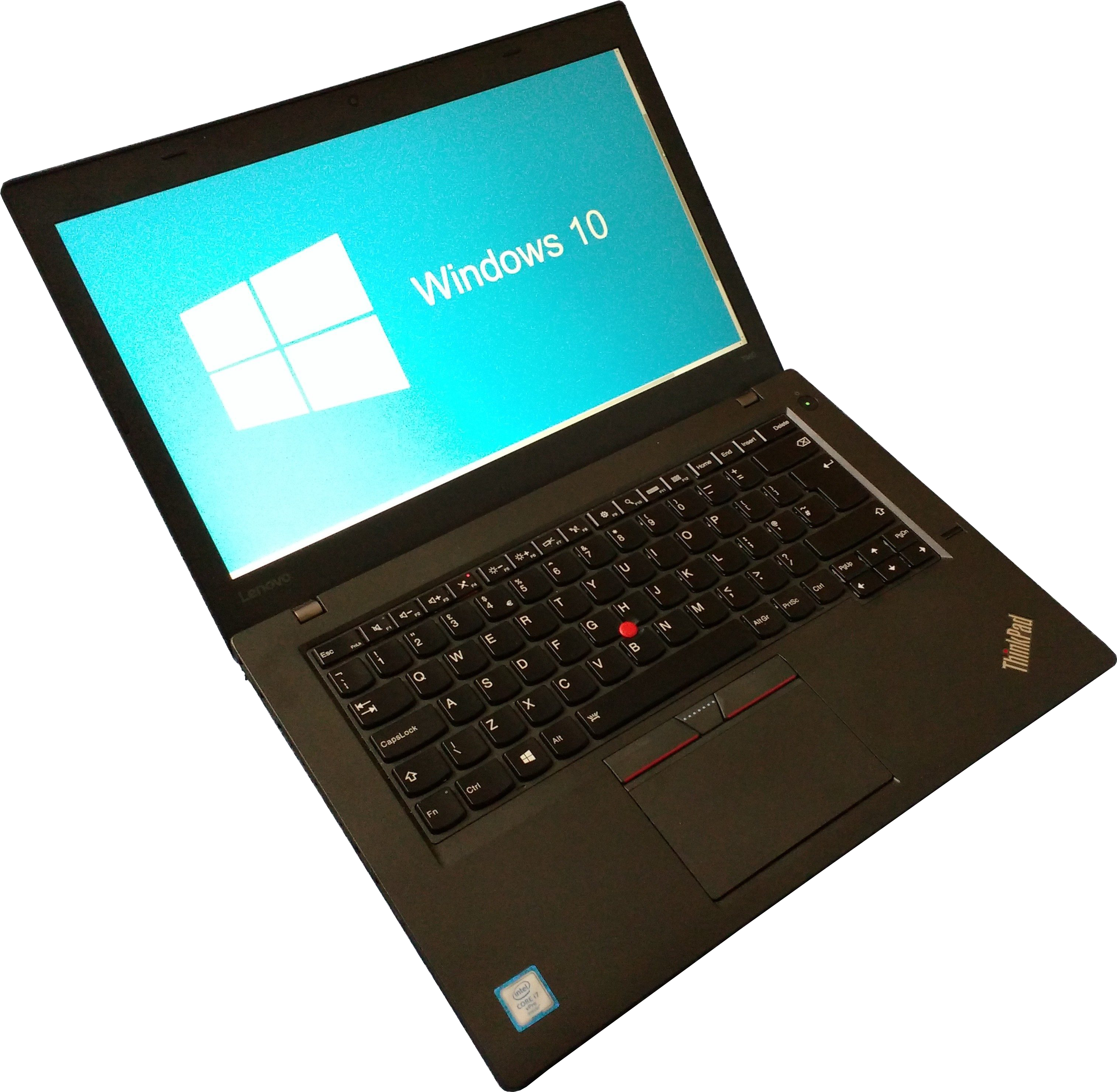
T460

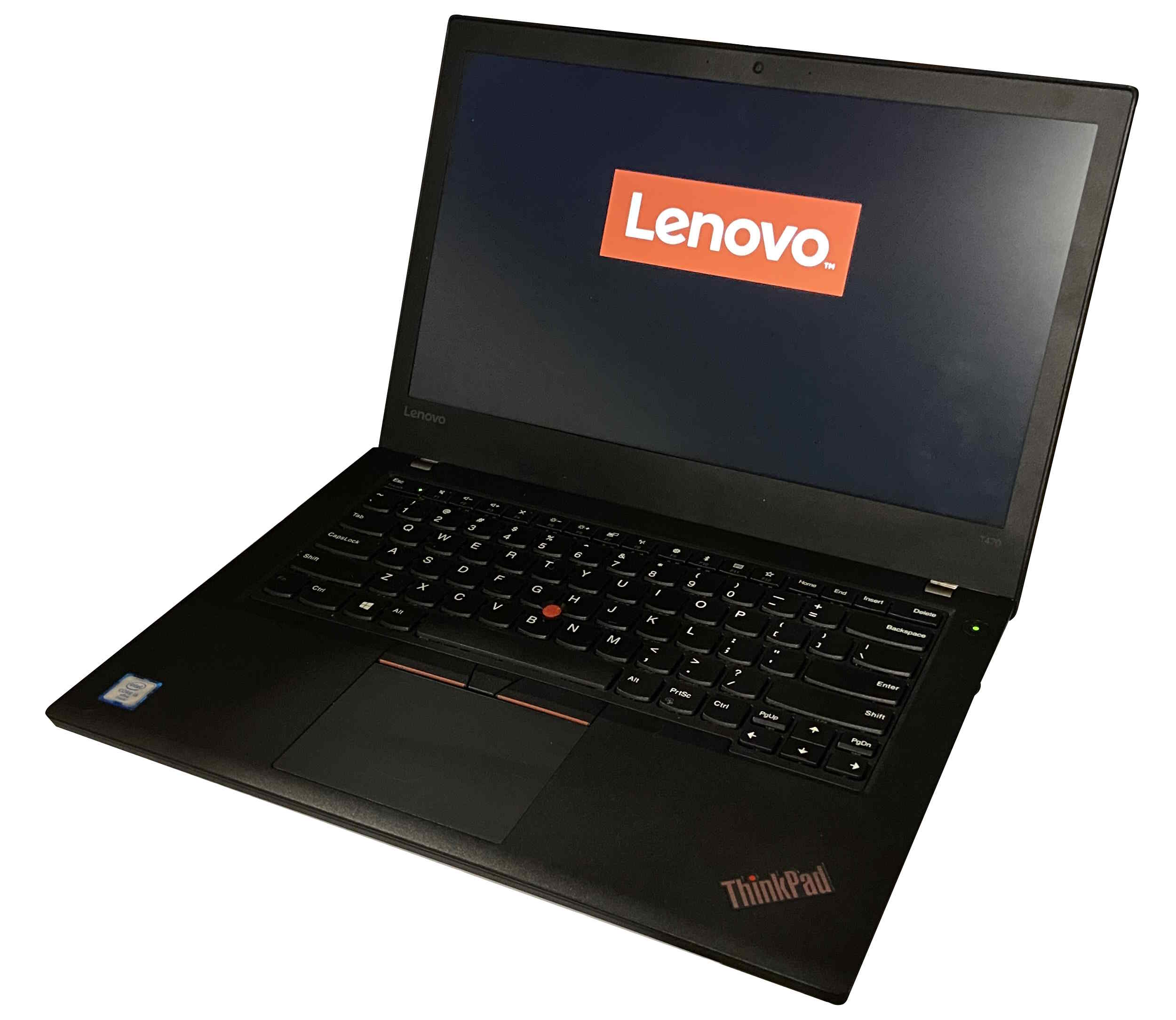
T470

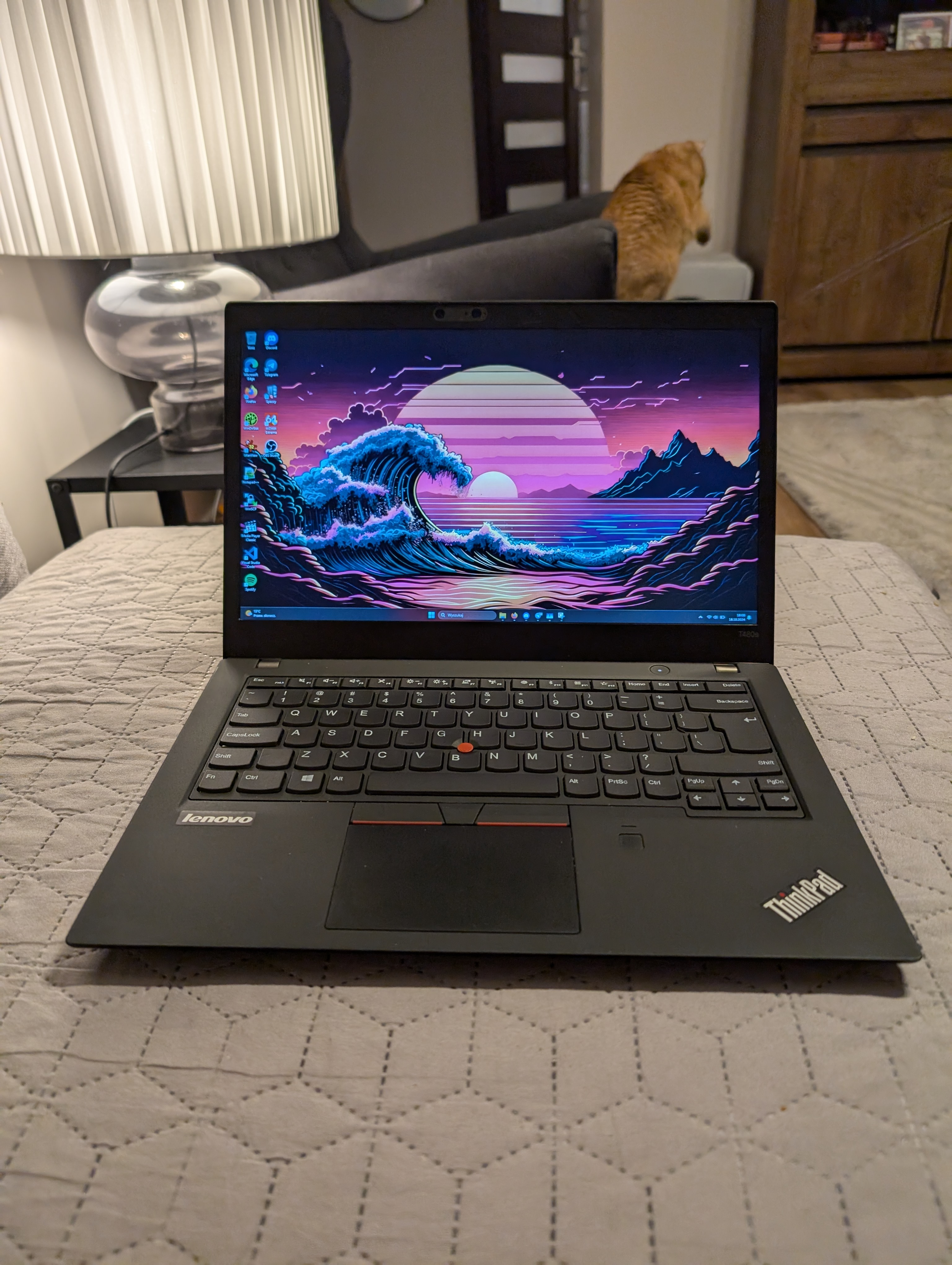
T480s running Windows 11
