= ThinkPad W series =

Series of mobile workstations by Lenovo

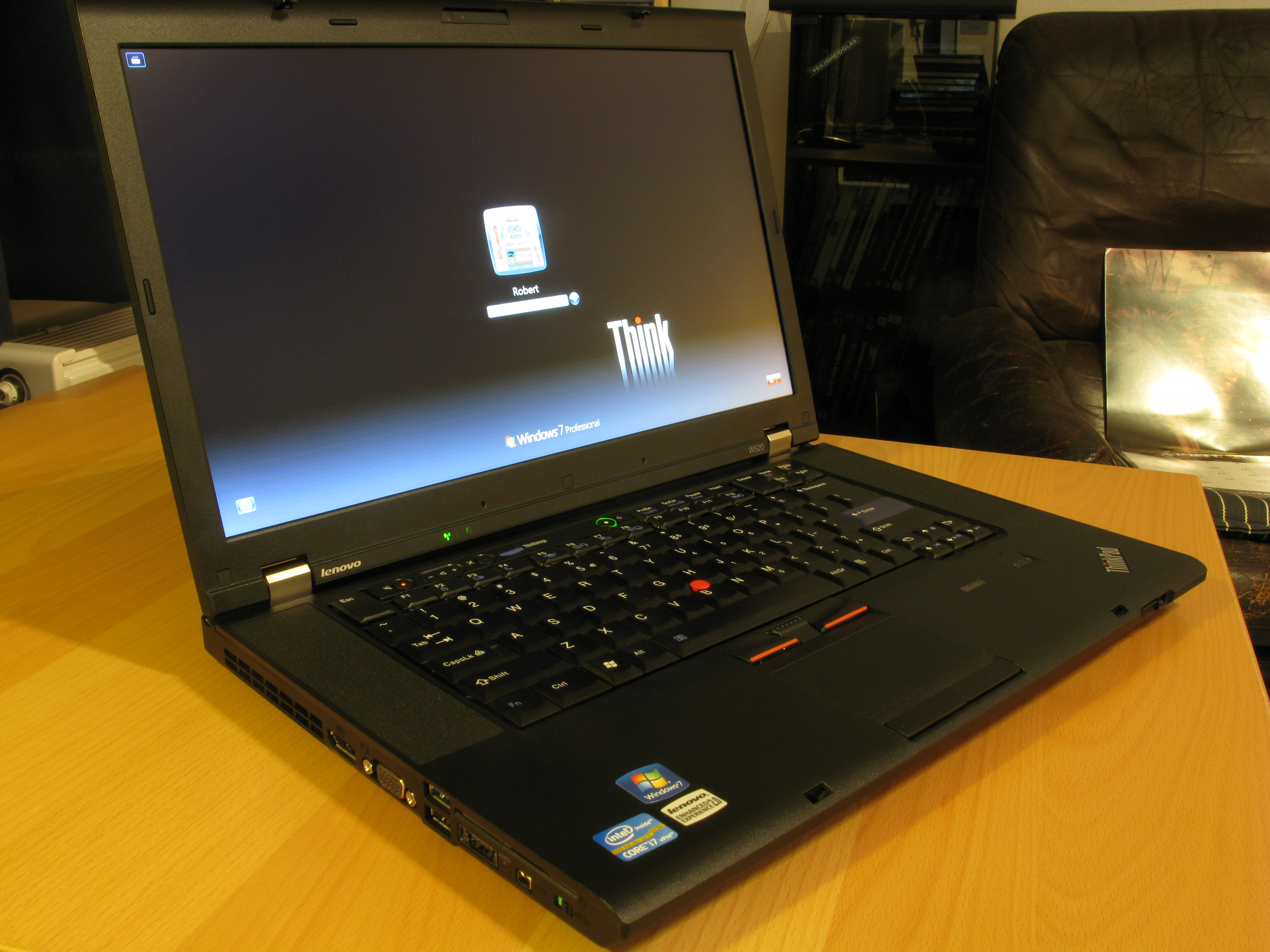
- ThinkPad W520 from 2011
- Developer: Lenovo (2008–2015)
- Product family: ThinkPad
- Type: Laptop (mobile workstation), Desktop replacement
- Released: 2008
- Discontinued: 2016
- Operating system: Microsoft Windows
- CPU: Intel Core
- Memory: Up to 32 GB (DDR3 SDRAM)
- Display: 15.6" or 17.3"
- Graphics: Nvidia Quadro, ATI FireGL
- Predecessor: Thinkpad T61p
- Successor: ThinkPad P series

The ThinkPad W-series laptops were introduced by Lenovo as workstation-class laptops with their own letter designation, a descendant of prior ThinkPad T series models suffixed with 'p'. The W series laptops were launched in 2008, at the same time as Intel Centrino 2, marking an overhaul of Lenovo's product lineup. The first two W series laptops introduced were the W500 and the W700.

The W series laptops from Lenovo were described by the manufacturer as being "mobile workstations", and suit that description by being physically on the larger side of the laptop spectrum, with screens ranging from 15.6" to 17.3" in size. Most W series laptops offered high-end quad-core Intel Core processors with an integrated GPU as well as an Nvidia Quadro discrete GPU, utilizing Nvidia Optimus to switch between the two GPUs as required. Notable exceptions are the W500, which has ATI Mobility FireGL integrated workstation-class graphics, and the W550s, which is an Ultrabook-specification laptop with only a dual-core processor. The W series laptops offered independent software vendor (ISV) certifications from various vendors such as Adobe Systems and Autodesk for computer-aided design (CAD) and 3D modeling software.

== Models ==
A list of laptops in the W series is given below. The list is arranged in chronological order.

ThinkPad W series (2008–2015)
Screen	Type	W*00 (2008)	W*01 (2009) W*1* (2010)	W*2* (2011)	W*3* (2012)	W*4* (2013)	W*41 (2014) W*5* (2015)
15.6"	Slim						W550s
15.6"	Performance	W500	W510	W520	W530	W540	W541
17.3"	Performance	W700	W701				
17.3"	Dual screen	W700ds	W701ds				
The W series was succeeded by the P series in 2015

Battery configuration

Main	M(x)	Main hot-swappable (max.cells)	Secondary	U	Ultrabay removable
Main	M(x)	Main hot-swappable (max.cells)	Secondary	u	Ultrabay unremovable
Main	M(x)	Main removable (max.cells)	Secondary	m(x)	internal (max.cells) "PowerBridge"
Main	m(x)	Main internal (max.cells)	Secondary	S	Slice battery

Laptop color codes

Processor

Socketed desktop processor
Socketed mobile processor
Soldered high power processor
Soldered standard power processor
Soldered low power processor
Soldered ultra low power processor

Weight

0.9 kg (2.0 lb)	Up to 0.91 kg
1.0 kg (2.2 lb)	0.92–1.0 kg
1.1 kg (2.4 lb)	1.01–1.1 kg
1.2 kg (2.6 lb)	1.11–1.2 kg
1.3 kg (2.9 lb)	1.21–1.3 kg
1.4 kg (3.1 lb)	1.31–1.4 kg
1.5 kg (3.3 lb)	1.41–1.5 kg
1.6 kg (3.5 lb)	1.51–1.6 kg
1.7 kg (3.7 lb)	1.61–1.7 kg
1.8 kg (4.0 lb)	1.71–1.81 kg
1.9 kg (4.2 lb)	1.81–1.91 kg
2.0 kg (4.4 lb)	1.91–2.03 kg
2.1 kg (4.6 lb)	2.04–2.14 kg
2.3 kg (5.1 lb)	2.15–2.4 kg
2.5 kg (5.5 lb)	2.41–2.75 kg
2.8 kg (6.2 lb)	2.76–3.05 kg
3.1 kg (6.8 lb)	3.06–3.42 kg
3.5 kg (7.7 lb)	3.43–3.99 kg
4.0 kg (8.8 lb)	4.0–4.99 kg
5.5 kg (12 lb)	5.0–6.49 kg
7.2 kg (16 lb)	6.5–7.99 kg
9.1 kg (20 lb)	8.0–9.99 kg
10.7 kg (24 lb)	10–11.99 kg
12.7 kg (28 lb)	12–14.49 kg
14.5 kg (32 lb)	14.5–17.99 kg
18.1 kg (40 lb)	18–20.99 kg
21.7 kg (48 lb)	21–23.99 kg
24 kg (53 lb)	24–28.99 kg
29.5 kg (65 lb)	29 kg and above

Screen resolution

4K or higher
1440p+ (WQHD, QXGA)
1080p+ (Full HD, UXGA)
Better than 768p (SXGA,SXGA+)
600p+ (SVGA, HD, XGA, HD+)
Up to 600p (VGA)

Graphics

Dual standard socket graphics option
Dual proprietary socket graphics option
Standard socket graphics option
Proprietary socket graphics option
Soldered performance graphics option
Soldered midrange graphics option
Soldered mainstream graphics option
Soldered entry graphics option
Integrated entry graphics
Integrated basic graphics

Laptop storage combinations (excluding WWAN slot)

Level	PCIe 4.0 x4	PCIe 3.0 x4	PCIe 3.0 x2	M.2 SATA	mSATA	1.8" SATA	2.5" SATA	1.8" IDE	2.5" IDE
	2019; Not yet (laptops)	2013	2013	2013	2009	2003	2003	1991	1988
	3						2		
	4								
	3						1		
	2						2		
	3					2			
	3								
	2						1		
	4								
	3					1			
	2					2			
	2								
	1						1		
	3								
	2					1			
	1								
	2								
	1					1			
			2				1		
							4		
		1							
			1				1		
							3		
			1						
				1			1		
					1		1		
						1	1		
							2		
									3
						1			
							1		
									2
								1	
									1

Laptop memory

Amount	LPDDR5X	LPDDR5	DDR5	LPDDR4X	LPDDR4	DDR4	LPDDR3	DDR4	DDR3L		DDR3		DDR2		DDR	SDR	EDO	FPM
Amount						dual channel		< dual channel	dual channel	< dual channel	dual channel	< dual channel	dual channel	< dual channel				
Amount	2022 (laptops)	2019 (laptops)	2020	2017	2014	2014	2012	2014	2010		2007		2003		1998	1993	1993	1987
max memory = 512 GB	N/A	N/A	512 GB	N/A	N/A	N/A	N/A	N/A	N/A	N/A	N/A	N/A	N/A	N/A	N/A	N/A	N/A	N/A
max memory = 256 GB	N/A		256 GB (4 slots)	N/A	N/A	N/A	N/A	N/A	N/A	N/A	N/A	N/A	N/A	N/A	N/A	N/A	N/A	N/A
max memory = 128 GB	128 GB		128 GB	N/A	N/A	128 GB (4 slots)	N/A	N/A	N/A	N/A	N/A	N/A	N/A	N/A	N/A	N/A	N/A	N/A
64 GB ≤ max memory < 128 GB		64 GB		N/A	N/A	64 GB	N/A	64 GB (2 slots)	64 GB (4 slots)	N/A	N/A	N/A	N/A	N/A	N/A	N/A	N/A	N/A
32 GB ≤ max memory < 64 GB				32 GB	32 GB	32 GB	N/A		32 GB	32 GB (2 slots)	32 GB (4 slots)	N/A	N/A	N/A	N/A	N/A	N/A	N/A
16 GB ≤ max memory < 32 GB						16 GB	16 GB		16 GB		16 GB	16 GB (2 slots)	16 GB (4 slots)	N/A	N/A	N/A	N/A	N/A
8 GB ≤ max memory < 16 GB						8 GB			8 GB		8 GB		8 GB	8 GB (2 slots)	8 GB (4 slots)	N/A	N/A	N/A
4 GB ≤ max memory < 8 GB						4 GB			4 GB		4 GB		4 GB		4 GB	4 GB (4 slots)	4 GB (4 slots)	N/A
2 GB ≤ max memory < 4 GB						2 GB (8 chips)			2 GB		2 GB		2 GB			2 GB	2 GB	N/A
1 GB ≤ max memory < 2 GB			1 GB (1 chip)	dual channel min	dual channel min	N/A		single channel min	1 GB		1 GB		1 GB					1 GB (4 slots)
512 MB ≤ max memory < 1 GB	N/A	N/A	N/A	single channel min	single channel min	N/A	dual channel min	half channel min	512 MB (8 chips)		512 MB (8 chips)		512 MB					512 MB
256 MB ≤ max memory < 512 MB	N/A	N/A	N/A	256 MB (1 chip)	256 MB (1 chip)	N/A	single channel min	256 MB (1 chip)	N/A	single channel min	N/A	single channel min	256 MB					
128 MB ≤ max memory < 256 MB	N/A	N/A	N/A	N/A	N/A	N/A	128 MB (1 chip)	N/A	N/A	half channel min	N/A	half channel min						
64 MB ≤ max memory < 128 MB	N/A	N/A	N/A	N/A	N/A	N/A	N/A	N/A	N/A	64 MB (1 chip)	N/A	64 MB (1 chip)						
max memory < 64 MB	N/A	N/A	N/A	N/A	N/A	N/A	N/A	N/A	N/A	N/A	N/A	N/A						

=== W500 ===
Released in 2008, W500 laptop was similar in design to the T61p it replaced. The all-black appearance was retained, as well as the TrackPoint in the middle of the keyboard. The W500 was appreciated for being equivalent in craftsmanship and stability to previous ThinkPads. Large metal hinges were used to hold the display in place, preventing a worn out or unsteady display. Other features on the laptop were a DisplayPort video output, three USB ports, a docking station connector, a maximum display resolution of 1920 × 1200, Intel Core 2 Duo processors and an ATI Mobility FireGL V5700 GPU.

Model	Release (US)	Dimensions	Weight	CPU	Chipset	Memory	Graphics	Storage	Networking	Screen	Battery	Other	Operating System
15.4"													
W500	2008	355.8 × 255 × 30.4–35.8	2.57 kg (5.7 lb)	Up to Intel Core 2 Duo T9900 (3.06GHz)	Intel GM45	DDR3 1066Mhz; Up to 8GB (2 slots)	Intel GMA 4500MHD (integrated, shared); ATI Mobility Radeon HD 3650 (discrete, 256 MB); ATI Mobility FireGL V5700 (discrete, 512 MB)	One 2.5" SATA Drive; One Ultrabay	Gigabit Ethernet; Wi-Fi Half Mini PCIe Card; Optional BT 2.1 Module; Optional WWAN Mini PCIe Card (exclusive)	1680 × 1050 TFT; 1920 × 1200 TFT	M(9) S	One white ThinkLight	Windows Vista Business (32/64-bit) Windows XP Professional Windows 7 Professional (32/64-bit)

=== W700 ===
Released in October 2008, the W700 laptop was lauded for its performance and for a host of features that were industry-first at the time. It was the first laptop with an integrated color calibrator. In addition, a biometric fingerprint scanner was available on the palmrest. With a quad-core Intel Core 2 Extreme QX9300 processor and Nvidia Quadro FX 3700M workstation GPU available, the laptop was among the most powerful at the time. One point not in the laptop's favor was the low battery life—approximately 2 hours and 30 minutes.

The laptop featured up to a 2.53 GHz Intel Core 2 Extreme QX9300 CPU, up to 8 GB of DDR3 RAM (two slots), either an (MXM-mounted) Nvidia Quadro FX 2700M or FX 3700M with up to 1 GB video RAM, and a 17-inch (43 cm) 16:10 TN LCD with a resolution of 1440 × 900 or 1920 × 1200.

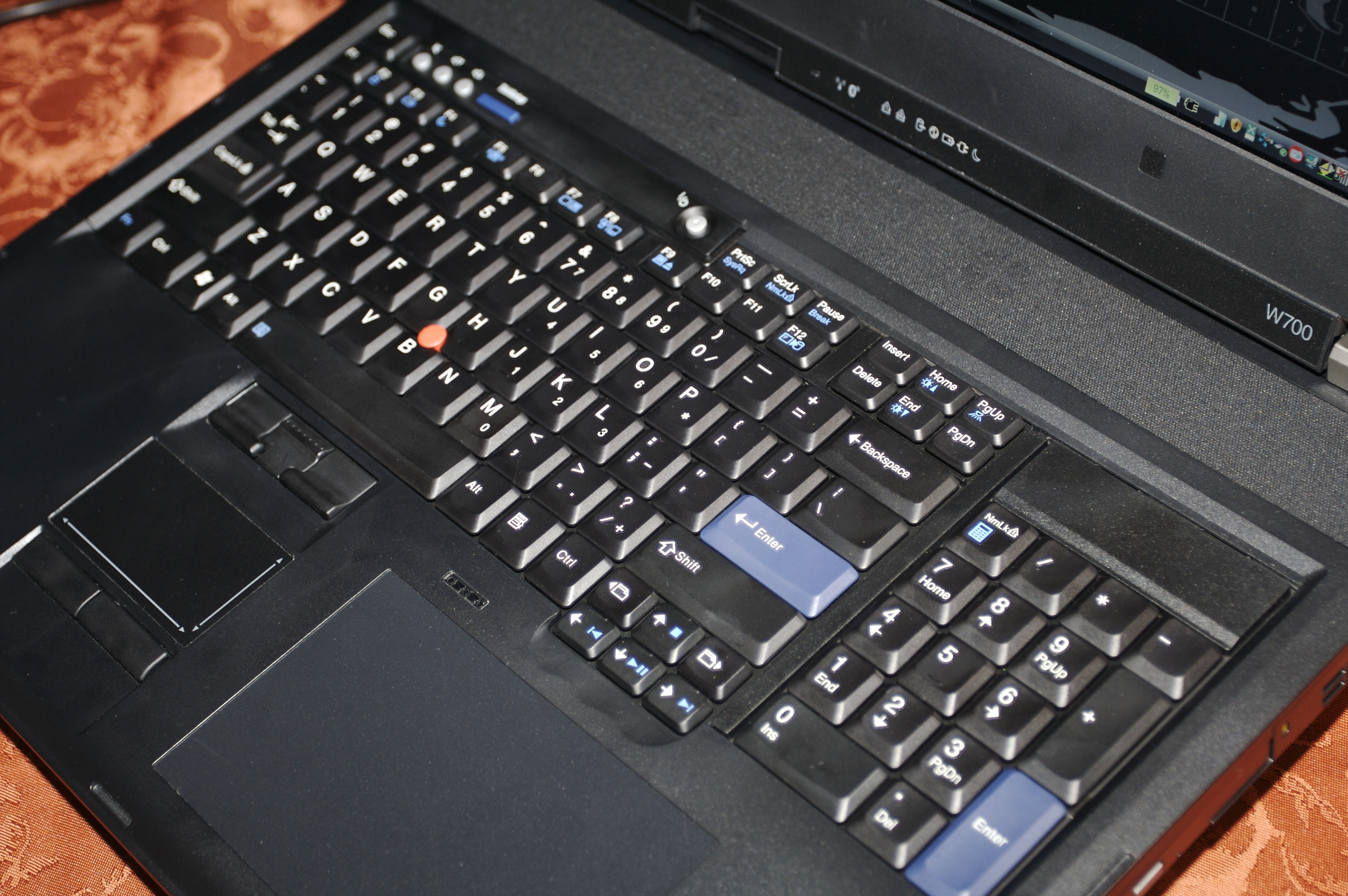

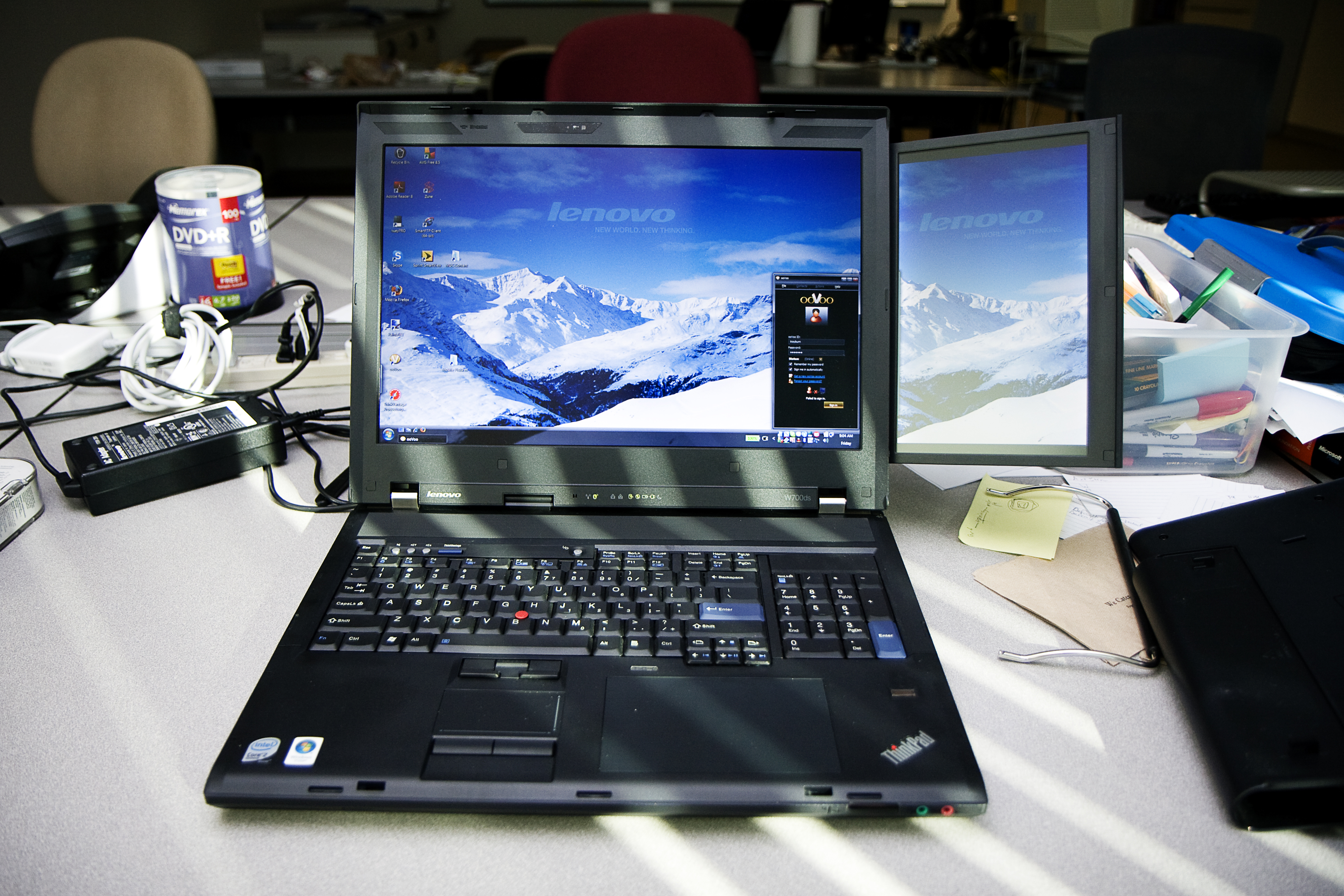
ThinkPad W700ds with integrated secondary screen and Wacom digitizer.

==== W700ds ====
The ThinkPad W700ds was nearly identical to the W700, with the addition of a 10.6-inch (27 cm) secondary sliding screen with a resolution of 1280 × 760. The W700ds laptop also offered additional storage space, with up to two 260 GB hard disk drives.

==== Reception ====
LaptopMag gave it 4/5 stars and noted its good 3D performance, built-in Wacom digitizer and good display with color calibration. Christopher Null from Wired magazine gave it a 7/10.

=== W510 ===
The W510, the logical successor of the ThinkPad W500 in a nearly identical 15" laptop frame, was released in January 2010.

The laptop's specifications are as follows:

- Processor: up to 2.0 GHz Intel Core i7-920XM Extreme
- Memory: up to 32 GB @ 1,333 MT/s DDR3 (4 DIMM sockets)
- Graphics:
  - Intel 5 series integrated graphics
  - Nvidia Quadro FX 880M
- Dimensions: 372.5 mm × 245.1 mm × 35.8 mm (14.67 in × 9.65 in × 1.41 in)
- Mass/Weight: Starting at 2.67 kg (5.89 lb) with a 6-cell battery

The W510 laptop was summed up by Laptop Review as, "The W510 provides performance, reliability and mobility. It is Ultra responsive for graphics-intensive tasks so you can accomplish more on the go."

Model	Release (US)	Dimensions	Weight	CPU	Chipset	Memory	Graphics	Storage	Networking	Screen	Battery	Other
15.6"
W510	2010	372.8 × 245.1 × 32–35.8	2.57 kg (5.7 lb)	1st Gen Intel Core; Up to i7-920XM	Intel QM57	DDR3 1333Mhz; Up to 16GB (2 slots, dual-core); 32GB (4 slots, quad-core)	Intel HD Graphics (integrated, shared, dual-core); Nvidia Quadro FX880M (discrete, 1 GB, quad-core)	One 2.5" SATA Drive; One Ultrabay	Gigabit Ethernet; Wi-Fi Half Mini PCIe Card; Optional BT 2.1 Module; Optional WWAN Mini PCIe Card (exclusive)	1366 × 768 TN; 1600 × 900 TN; 1920 × 1080 TN	M(9) S	One white ThinkLight

=== W701 ===
The W701ds was released in February 2010, after specifications were leaked earlier that month. The W701ds had an introduction price of 3799 USD. At the time of the release, Lenovo stated that according to their market research, customers did not want devices with a slate form factor. It received positive reviews. Techradar.com has this to say about the W701: "the ThinkPad W700 – [the W701’s] predecessor – was once the most powerful laptop we had seen, but the W701 has successfully stolen that crown."

Released in April 2010, the W701 and W701ds, offered the following specifications:

- Processor: 2.0 GHz Intel Core i7-920XM Extreme
- Memory: Up to 16 GB @ 1333 MT/s DDR3 (4 DIMM sockets)
- Graphics:
  - Nvidia Quadro FX 3800M
  - Nvidia Quadro FX 2800M
- Dimensions: 410 mm × 310 mm × 40.6 mm (16.14 in × 12.20 in × 1.60 in)
- Mass/Weight: Starting at 4.0 kg (8.9 lb)

==== W701ds ====
The Lenovo ThinkPad W701ds is the logical successor to the W700ds, and shares the same exterior physical design.

Gizmodo said, about the W701ds laptop, "Lenovo ThinkPad W701ds pairs beastly specs with an integrated secondary screen." The laptop also received favorable reviews from PCWorld, which called the laptop a "portable goliath that could replace desktop workstations, letting pros stay productive from anywhere". Gadgets Fan said about the W701ds, "Despite its massive size, Lenovo ThinkPad W701ds laptop is worth the purchase" and suggested that it was "almost comparable to a desktop workstation".

=== W520 ===
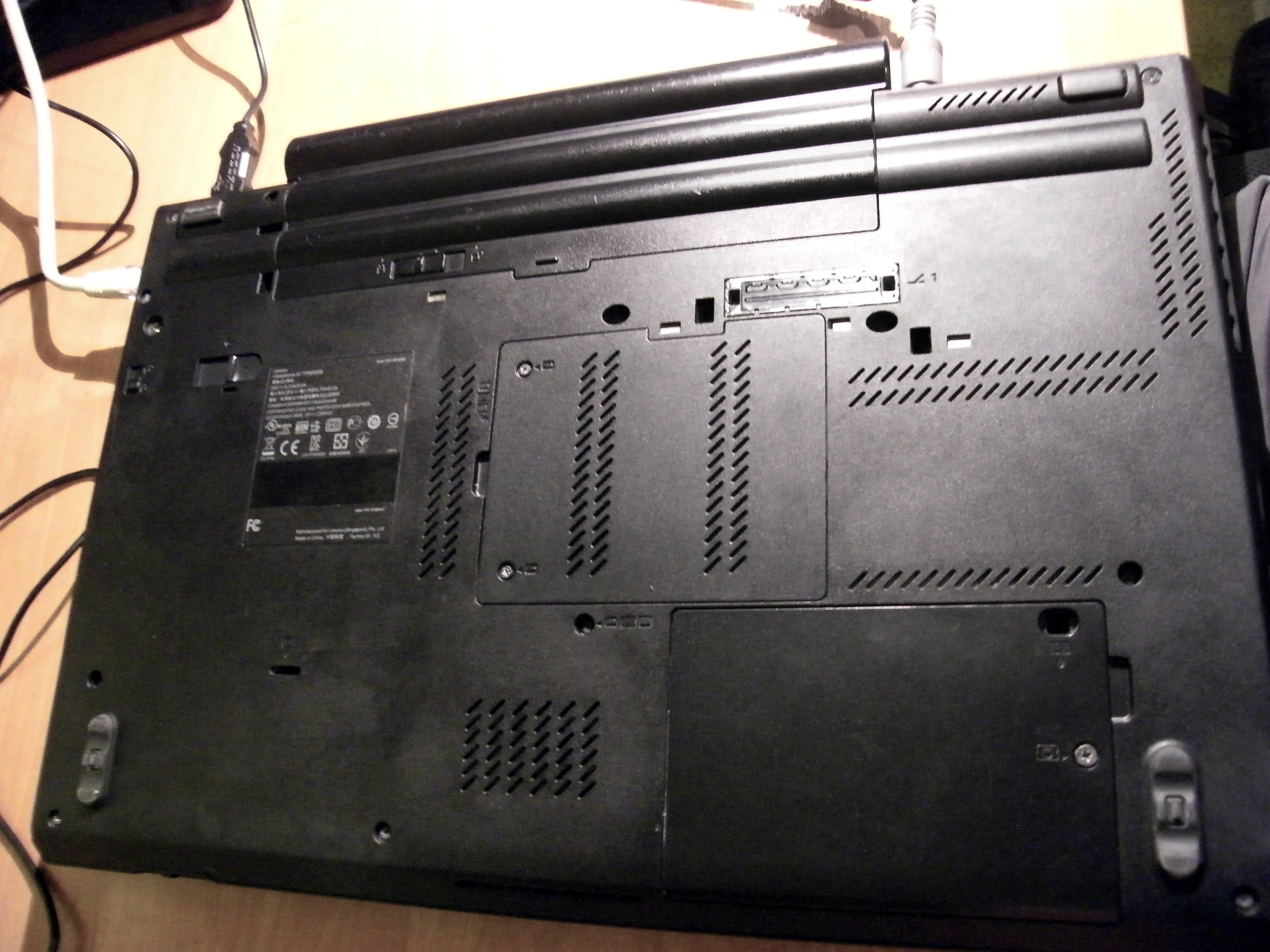
Bottom side of a ThinkPad W520 with removable covers for modular components and replacement battery with extended capacity

The W520, the logical successor to the W510, was released in March 2011 and offered the following specifications in the best configuration:

- Processor: up to 2.7 GHz Intel Core i7-2960XM (socketed processor)
- Memory: up to 32 GB DDR3-1333 (4 SO-DIMM sockets), in 4-core/8-thread models (QM or XM processors); up to 16 GB DDR3 (2 SO-DIMM sockets), in 2-core/4-thread models (M processors; only slots 0 and 2 are usable in these models, and these won't POST if slots 1 and/or 3 are populated, and for which dummy DIMMs are provided, but aren't actually checked)
- Graphics:
  - Intel HD Graphics 3000 (integrated; 12 EUs)
  - Nvidia Quadro 1000M (discrete; 2 GB DDR3, 96 CUDA cores)
  - Nvidia Quadro 2000M (discrete; 2 GB DDR3, 192 CUDA cores)
- Display: 15.6 in (40 cm) 1600 × 900 or 1920 × 1080 (16∶9) LED-backlit TN LCD (95% Adobe RGB coverage)
- Dimensions: 372.8 mm × 245.1 mm × 31.8 mm–35.6 mm (14.68 in × 9.65 in × 1.25 in–1.40 in)
- Mass/Weight: 2.70 kg (5.95 lb) (with an optical drive)

According to LAPTOP Magazine, "the ThinkPad W520 offers blistering performance that should satisfy the most demanding users and businesses." On PCMark Vantage, the ThinkPad W520 scored 9909 points, 30% higher than the average score of desktop replacements. It also scored higher than the Dell Latitude E6420, which received a score of 7796.

Processing and graphics
The 2011 W520 model includes up to a quad-core Intel Core i7 Extreme Edition socketed processor with Hyper-Threading technology. They are also equipped with Lenovo Enhanced Experience 2.0 for Windows 7.

Graphics options on the W520 model included Nvidia Fermi architecture-based Quadro graphics with Optimus technology. This allows for support for up to two additional monitors. Despite the fact that the W-series laptops are Ubuntu certified, Optimus is not well supported in Linux, requiring workarounds for proper functionality. The 2011 W-series laptops offer 1080p FHD (1920 × 1080) displays with 95% coverage of the Adobe RGB color space gamut. X-Rite Pantone color calibration is also included.

Storage space on the W520 model is up to 640 GB. The 2011 W-series laptops also include superspeed USB 3.0 ports.

ISV certifications
The W520 includes ISV certifications for DSS CATIA, SolidWorks, Autodesk Inventor, AutoCAD, Adobe, and Maya.

Model	Release (US)	Dimensions	Weight	CPU	Chipset	Memory ^{(max)}	Graphics	Storage	Networking	Screen	Battery	Other
15.6"
W520	2011	372.8 × 245.1 × 31.8–35.6	2.45 kg (5.4 lb)	2nd Gen Intel Core; Up to i7-2960XM (4C8T 2.5 GHz 8 MB L3)	Intel QM67	16GB DDR3 1333MHz or 32GB DDR3 1333MHz (quad core) (2 slots, dual-core) or (4 slots, quad-core)	Intel HD 3000; Optional Nvidia Quadro 1000M or 2000M (2GB)	One 2.5" Drive; One UltraBay Drive	Gigabit Ethernet; Wi-Fi Half Mini PCIe Card; BT 3.0 Module; Optional WWAN mSATA Card	1600 × 900 TN; 1920 × 1080 TN	M(9) S	One white ThinkLight

=== W530 ===
Released in June, 2012, the W530 has a very similar exterior appearance to the prior W models. Being the last W model prior to the W540 redesign, it is the last W to feature the lid lock, keyboard light and wireless and HDD LED indicators, and the first W model to feature the controversial chiclet keyboard, which features 6 rows rather than 7 rows of keys and a more modern key shape. The W530 comes equipped with Ivy Bridge processors.

Notable changes/new features:

- 3rd generation Intel Core (Ivy Bridge) processors
- Intel HD 4000 (16 EUs) and Nvidia Kepler-based Quadro graphics
  - K1000M (2 GB DDR3, 192 CUDA cores)
  - K2000M (2 GB DDR3, 384 CUDA cores)
- Mini DisplayPort v1.2
- New-style 6-row keyboard with optional backlight

Model	Release (US)	Dimensions	Weight	CPU	Chipset	Memory ^{(max)}	Graphics	Storage	Networking	Screen	Battery	Other
15.6"
W530	June 2012	372.8 x 245.1 x 31.8–35.6	2.81 kg (6.2 lb)	3rd Gen Intel Core; Up to i7-3940XM (4C8T 3.0 GHz 8 MB L3)	Intel QM77	16GB DDR3 1600MHz or 32GB DDR3 1600MHz (quad core) (2 slots, dual-core) or (4 slots, quad-core)	Intel HD 4000; Optional Nvidia Quadro K1000M or K2000M (2GB)	One 2.5" Drive; One UltraBay Drive	GigaBit Network Connection; Wi-Fi Half Mini PCIe Card; BT 4.0 Module; Optional WWAN mSATA Card	1366 × 768 TN; 1600 × 900 TN; 1920 × 1080 TN	M(9) S	One white ThinkLight

=== W540 ===
Announced in 2013 and released in the US and Europe early 2014, the W540 featured a brand-new, slimmer design based on the new generations T540p. Slimmer than the prior W530, the new design received mixed reactions from traditional ThinkPad users. Critique was mainly aimed towards lower build quality and missing user interface indicators, together with a new style of touchpad where the traditional ThinkPad trackpoint functionality had been radically changed, and the controversial island style keyboard introduced in 2012 on other products, which many enthusiasts claimed abandoned the core tactile principles established by IBM over previous decades.

The new W series however featured newer hardware such as the option for a 3K 2880 x 1620 IPS display. Other new features included:

- 4th generation Core i7 processors
- Upgraded Quadro GPUs to K1100M and K2100M
- Full size keyboard with numeric keypad (though offset from center of screen, causing criticism from those who rarely use the keypad)
- New touchpad/trackpoint integration (though TrackPoint "thumb" buttons were removed causing criticism due to lost tactile feedback)
- Changed UltraBay design (the easy eject locking buttons were replaced by a hidden locking screw rendering "hot swap" functionality moot and earlier UltraBay modules incompatible)
- New rectangular connector for charger (rendering earlier accessories and docking stations obsolete)
- Thinner profile
- Lighter weight

=== W541 ===
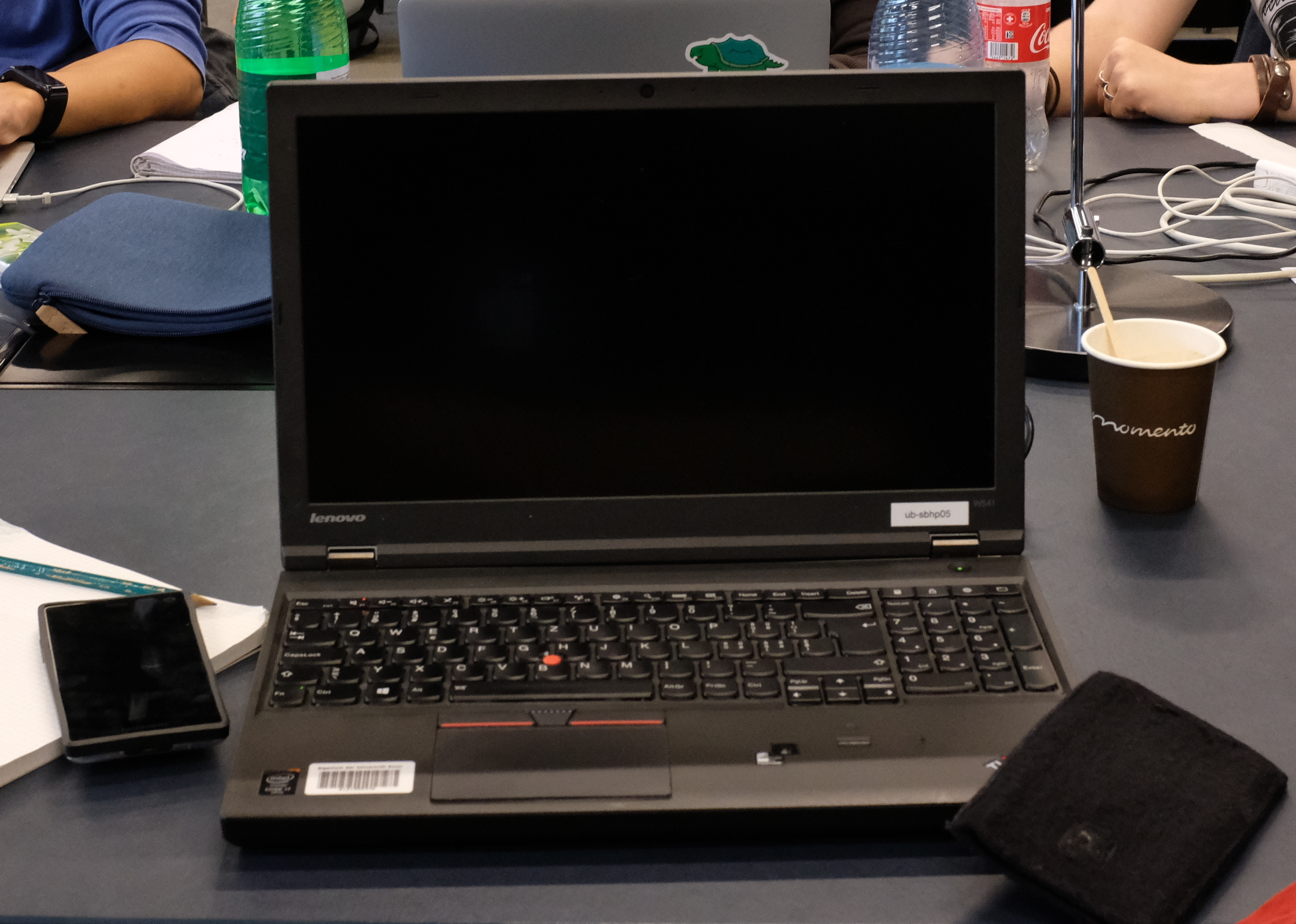
ThinkPad W541 (in front)

The W541 is a ThinkPad W540 featuring the new-style keyboard but with a re-introduction of the classic ThinkPad touchpad design. The prior ThinkPad touchpad design featured in the W540 and other 4th-gen ThinkPads was abandoned.

=== W550s ===
Rather than being a successor of any previous W-series model, the W550s is a thinner Ultrabook variant of the W series; Likewise a latest P5xs series ThinkPad, the W550s was based in a T-series chassis. While a capable Ultrabook, when compared to the W541 and its predecessors, it offers less capability with only dual-core hyper-threaded Intel Broadwell processors vs. the true quad-core processors of other models and has only two RAM slots.

== Discontinuation and successor ==
The ThinkPad W series was discontinued and replaced by ThinkPad P series, beginning with the P50s, P50 and P70 in 2016. The P70 re-introduced the 17-inch screen to the ThinkPad workstation line.
