= IBM i series =

IBM i series may refer to:

- IBM ThinkPad i series — laptop line (1998–2002)
- IBM eServer iSeries — server line (2000-2004)

Also may refer to IBM i Operating system (2008-current).
