= ThinkPad R series =

Line of budget to mid-range laptop computers

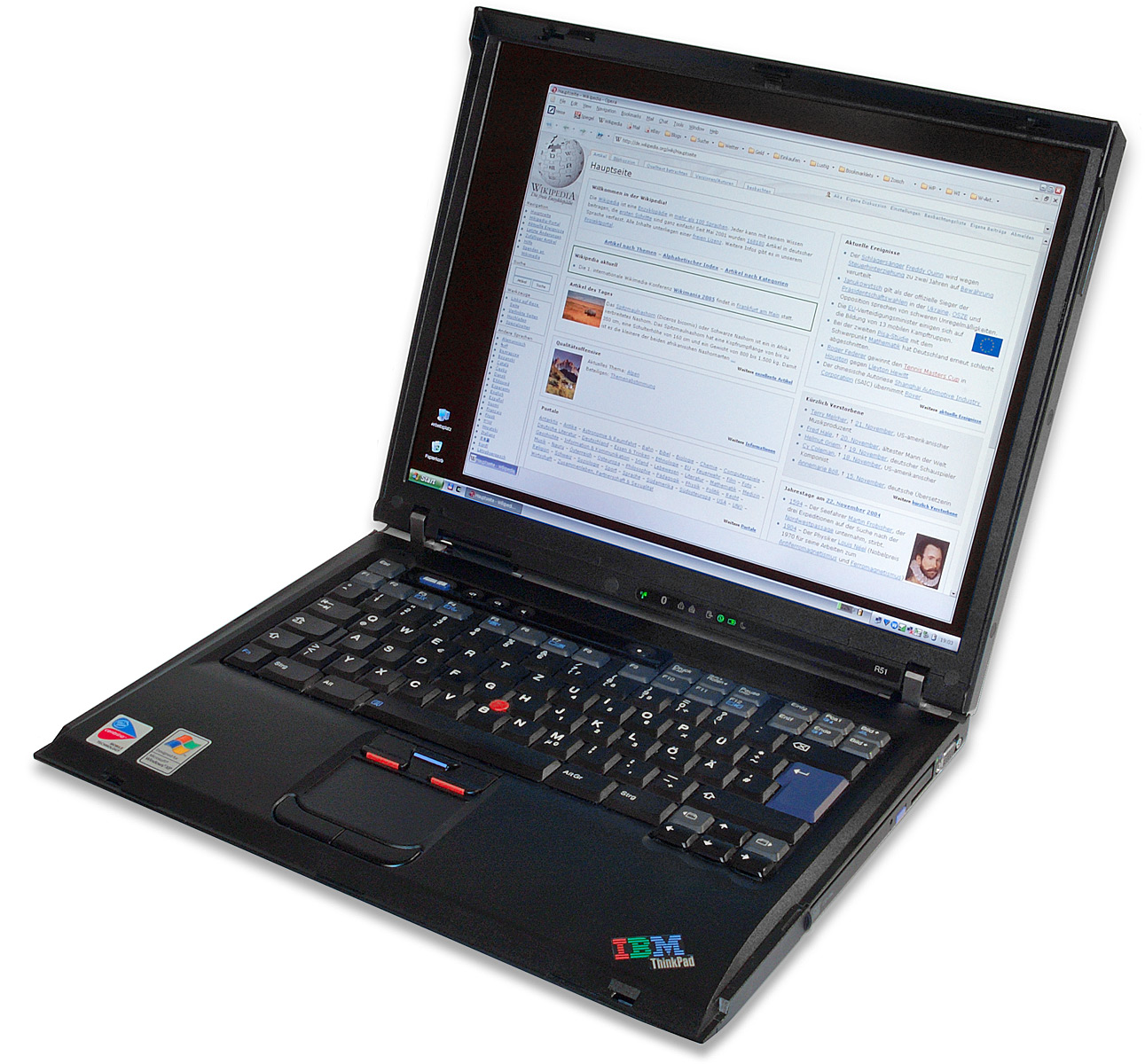
- ThinkPad R51 15"
- Developer: IBM (2001–2004); Lenovo (2005–2010) (2017-2025 only for Chinese Markets)
- Type: Mid-range Laptop (Rxx, Rxx0), Budget Laptop (Rxxi, Rxxe), Mobile workstation (R50p)
- Released: October 2001; 25 years ago
- Operating system: Microsoft Windows
- Predecessor: ThinkPad 300 series, ThinkPad A series
- Successor: ThinkPad E series, ThinkPad L series, ThinkPad SL series

The R series line of budget to mid-range laptops are part of Lenovo's ThinkPad product line and released as a successor to the ThinkPad 300 Series and ThinkPad A Series from 2005 to 2010 when it was discontinued in favor of having multiple different models for the different market segments that the R series originally occupied. Formerly an IBM brand, the series was produced by IBM until Lenovo acquired the ThinkPad brand following its purchase of IBM's Personal Computing Division (PCD) in 2005.

IBM originally released the Thinkpad R Series (Starting with the R30) as the mid-range mainstream model of the ThinkPad brand. It was conceived as a laptop "for the business executive working on a budget - a road warrior with an office network whose out-of-office work rarely goes beyond running PowerPoint shows or demonstrating spreadsheets". A laptop created as the T series but lower end, the R series computers had IBM make sacrifices in materials and construction (notably the lack of a magnesium midframe and rubberized metal lid) which higher end models of ThinkPad like the T series had. This, along with lower performance configurations when compared to the T series allowed the R series to become the lower end regular laptop model of the ThinkPad line.

Despite having a cheaper build when compared to the higher end T series of its time, it still received favorable reviews. In a review on the ThinkPad R40, CNET gave the laptop a score of 8.2, writing in their summary statement that "Good performance, along with great design and battery life, make the ThinkPad R40 a trusted friend for the traveler and the desk jockey". Starting from the R50, it became completely based on the T series (instead of just looking similar) with the same concessions as before. Though the R series did include a FireWire port which was not brought to the T series until the ThinkPad T61.

In 2010, the R Series was discontinued in favor of the L, SL, and the E series of Thinkpads.

In 2017, it was brought back and continued as a more premium version of the ThinkPad E Series, in China only, with premium features already optioned such as aluminium lids and finger print readers.

Battery configuration

| Main | M(x) | Main hot-swappable (max.cells) | Secondary | U | Ultrabay removable |
| Main | M(x) | Main hot-swappable (max.cells) | Secondary | u | Ultrabay unremovable |
| Main | M(x) | Main removable (max.cells) | Secondary | m(x) | internal (max.cells) "PowerBridge" |
| Main | m(x) | Main internal (max.cells) | Secondary | S | Slice battery |

Laptop color codes

Processor

Socketed desktop processor
Socketed mobile processor
Soldered high power processor
Soldered standard power processor
Soldered low power processor
Soldered ultra low power processor

Weight

| 0.9 kg (2.0 lb) | Up to 0.91 kg |
| 1.0 kg (2.2 lb) | 0.92–1.0 kg |
| 1.1 kg (2.4 lb) | 1.01–1.1 kg |
| 1.2 kg (2.6 lb) | 1.11–1.2 kg |
| 1.3 kg (2.9 lb) | 1.21–1.3 kg |
| 1.4 kg (3.1 lb) | 1.31–1.4 kg |
| 1.5 kg (3.3 lb) | 1.41–1.5 kg |
| 1.6 kg (3.5 lb) | 1.51–1.6 kg |
| 1.7 kg (3.7 lb) | 1.61–1.7 kg |
| 1.8 kg (4.0 lb) | 1.71–1.81 kg |
| 1.9 kg (4.2 lb) | 1.81–1.91 kg |
| 2.0 kg (4.4 lb) | 1.91–2.03 kg |
| 2.1 kg (4.6 lb) | 2.04–2.14 kg |
| 2.3 kg (5.1 lb) | 2.15–2.4 kg |
| 2.5 kg (5.5 lb) | 2.41–2.75 kg |
| 2.8 kg (6.2 lb) | 2.76–3.05 kg |
| 3.1 kg (6.8 lb) | 3.06–3.42 kg |
| 3.5 kg (7.7 lb) | 3.43–3.99 kg |
| 4.0 kg (8.8 lb) | 4.0–4.99 kg |
| 5.5 kg (12 lb) | 5.0–6.49 kg |
| 7.2 kg (16 lb) | 6.5–7.99 kg |
| 9.1 kg (20 lb) | 8.0–9.99 kg |
| 10.7 kg (24 lb) | 10–11.99 kg |
| 12.7 kg (28 lb) | 12–14.49 kg |
| 14.5 kg (32 lb) | 14.5–17.99 kg |
| 18.1 kg (40 lb) | 18–20.99 kg |
| 21.7 kg (48 lb) | 21–23.99 kg |
| 24 kg (53 lb) | 24–28.99 kg |
| 29.5 kg (65 lb) | 29 kg and above |

Screen resolution

4K or higher
1440p+ (WQHD, QXGA)
1080p+ (Full HD, UXGA)
Better than 768p (SXGA,SXGA+)
600p+ (SVGA, HD, XGA, HD+)
Up to 600p (VGA)

Graphics

Dual standard socket graphics option
Dual proprietary socket graphics option
Standard socket graphics option
Proprietary socket graphics option
Soldered performance graphics option
Soldered midrange graphics option
Soldered mainstream graphics option
Soldered entry graphics option
Integrated entry graphics
Integrated basic graphics

Laptop storage combinations (excluding WWAN slot)

| Level | PCIe 4.0 x4 | PCIe 3.0 x4 | PCIe 3.0 x2 | M.2 SATA | mSATA | 1.8" SATA | 2.5" SATA | 1.8" IDE | 2.5" IDE |
|---|---|---|---|---|---|---|---|---|---|
| | 2019; Not yet (laptops) | 2013 | 2013 | 2013 | 2009 | 2003 | 2003 | 1991 | 1988 |
| | 3 | | | | | | 2 | | |
| | 4 | | | | | | | | |
| | 3 | | | | | | 1 | | |
| | 2 | | | | | | 2 | | |
| | 3 | | | | | 2 | | | |
| | 3 | | | | | | | | |
| | 2 | | | | | | 1 | | |
| | 4 | | | | | | | | |
| | 3 | | | | | 1 | | | |
| | 2 | | | | | 2 | | | |
| | 2 | | | | | | | | |
| | 1 | | | | | | 1 | | |
| | 3 | | | | | | | | |
| | 2 | | | | | 1 | | | |
| | 1 | | | | | | | | |
| | 2 | | | | | | | | |
| | 1 | | | | | 1 | | | |
| | | | 2 | | | | 1 | | |
| | | | | | | | 4 | | |
| | | 1 | | | | | | | |
| | | | 1 | | | | 1 | | |
| | | | | | | | 3 | | |
| | | | 1 | | | | | | |
| | | | | 1 | | | 1 | | |
| | | | | | 1 | | 1 | | |
| | | | | | | 1 | 1 | | |
| | | | | | | | 2 | | |
| | | | | | | | | | 3 |
| | | | | | | 1 | | | |
| | | | | | | | 1 | | |
| | | | | | | | | | 2 |
| | | | | | | | | 1 | |
| | | | | | | | | | 1 |

Laptop memory

| Amount | LPDDR5X | LPDDR5 | DDR5 | LPDDR4X | LPDDR4 | DDR4 | LPDDR3 | DDR4 | DDR3L | | DDR3 | | DDR2 | | DDR | SDR | EDO | FPM |
| Amount | | | | | | dual channel | | < dual channel | dual channel | < dual channel | dual channel | < dual channel | dual channel | < dual channel | | | | |
|---|---|---|---|---|---|---|---|---|---|---|---|---|---|---|---|---|---|---|
| Amount | 2022 (laptops) | 2019 (laptops) | 2020 | 2017 | 2014 | 2014 | 2012 | 2014 | 2010 | | 2007 | | 2003 | | 1998 | 1993 | 1993 | 1987 |
| max memory = 512 GB | N/A | N/A | 512 GB | N/A | N/A | N/A | N/A | N/A | N/A | N/A | N/A | N/A | N/A | N/A | N/A | N/A | N/A | N/A |
| max memory = 256 GB | N/A | | 256 GB (4 slots) | N/A | N/A | N/A | N/A | N/A | N/A | N/A | N/A | N/A | N/A | N/A | N/A | N/A | N/A | N/A |
| max memory = 128 GB | 128 GB | | 128 GB | N/A | N/A | 128 GB (4 slots) | N/A | N/A | N/A | N/A | N/A | N/A | N/A | N/A | N/A | N/A | N/A | N/A |
| 64 GB ≤ max memory < 128 GB | | 64 GB | | N/A | N/A | 64 GB | N/A | 64 GB (2 slots) | 64 GB (4 slots) | N/A | N/A | N/A | N/A | N/A | N/A | N/A | N/A | N/A |
| 32 GB ≤ max memory < 64 GB | | | | 32 GB | 32 GB | 32 GB | N/A | | 32 GB | 32 GB (2 slots) | 32 GB (4 slots) | N/A | N/A | N/A | N/A | N/A | N/A | N/A |
| 16 GB ≤ max memory < 32 GB | | | | | | 16 GB | 16 GB | | 16 GB | | 16 GB | 16 GB (2 slots) | 16 GB (4 slots) | N/A | N/A | N/A | N/A | N/A |
| 8 GB ≤ max memory < 16 GB | | | | | | 8 GB | | | 8 GB | | 8 GB | | 8 GB | 8 GB (2 slots) | 8 GB (4 slots) | N/A | N/A | N/A |
| 4 GB ≤ max memory < 8 GB | | | | | | 4 GB | | | 4 GB | | 4 GB | | 4 GB | | 4 GB | 4 GB (4 slots) | 4 GB (4 slots) | N/A |
| 2 GB ≤ max memory < 4 GB | | | | | | 2 GB (8 chips) | | | 2 GB | | 2 GB | | 2 GB | | | 2 GB | 2 GB | N/A |
| 1 GB ≤ max memory < 2 GB | | | 1 GB (1 chip) | dual channel min | dual channel min | N/A | | single channel min | 1 GB | | 1 GB | | 1 GB | | | | | 1 GB (4 slots) |
| 512 MB ≤ max memory < 1 GB | N/A | N/A | N/A | single channel min | single channel min | N/A | dual channel min | half channel min | 512 MB (8 chips) | | 512 MB (8 chips) | | 512 MB | | | | | 512 MB |
| 256 MB ≤ max memory < 512 MB | N/A | N/A | N/A | 256 MB (1 chip) | 256 MB (1 chip) | N/A | single channel min | 256 MB (1 chip) | N/A | single channel min | N/A | single channel min | 256 MB | | | | | |
| 128 MB ≤ max memory < 256 MB | N/A | N/A | N/A | N/A | N/A | N/A | 128 MB (1 chip) | N/A | N/A | half channel min | N/A | half channel min | | | | | | |
| 64 MB ≤ max memory < 128 MB | N/A | N/A | N/A | N/A | N/A | N/A | N/A | N/A | N/A | 64 MB (1 chip) | N/A | 64 MB (1 chip) | | | | | | |
| max memory < 64 MB | N/A | N/A | N/A | N/A | N/A | N/A | N/A | N/A | N/A | N/A | N/A | N/A | | | | | | |

== T Series Based Models ==
ThinkPad R series (2001–2010)
| Case Size | Screen | Type | R3x (2001–2002) | | | R4x (2003) | R5x (2003–2004) | | | R6x (2005–2008) | | Rx00 (2008–2010) |
4:3 screens
| 14.1" | 13.3" | Mainstream | R30 | R31 | R32 | R40 | merged with 14" line | | | | | Only in 16:10 |
| 14.1" | 13.3" | Economy | | | | R40e | merged with 14" line | | | | | Only in 16:10 |
| 14.1" | 14.1" | Mainstream | R30 | R31 | R32 | R40 | R50 | R51 | R52 | R60 | R61 | Only in 16:10 |
| 14.1" | 14.1" | Performance | | | | | R50p | | | | | Only in 16:10 |
| 14.1" | 14.1" | In Between | | | | | | | | R60i | 16:10 only | Only in 16:10 |
| 14.1" | 14.1" | Economy | | | | R40e | R50e | R51e | | Only 15" | | Only in 16:10 |
| 15" | | Mainstream | | | | R40 | R50 | R51 | R52 | R60 | R61 | Only in 16:10 |
| 15" | | Performance | | | | | R50p | | | | | Only in 16:10 |
| 15" | | In Between | | | | | | | | R60i | R61i | Only in 16:10 |
| 15" | | Economy | | | | | R50e | R51e | | R60e | | Only in 16:10 |
16:10 screens
| 14.1" | | Mainstream | | | | | | | | | R61 | R400 |
| 14.1" | | In Between | | | | | | | | | R61i | Replaced by Edge/E series |
| 14.1" | | Education | | | | | | | | | R61u | |
| 15.4" | | Mainstream | | | | | | | | | R61 | R500 |
| 15.4" | | In Between | | | | | | | | | R61i | Replaced by Edge/E series |
| 15.4" | | Economy | | | | | | | | | R61e | Replaced by SL series |
| 15.4" | | Education | | | | | | | | | R61u | |

=== 2001-2002 ===
==== R30 ====
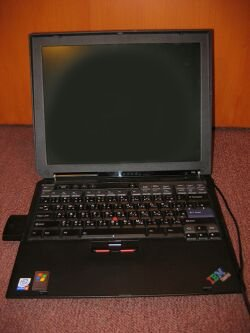
IBM ThinkPad R32

The ThinkPad R30 came in 2 display options: an XGA 13.3" or 14.1". It was, along with the A30, the first ThinkPad to use the design features of a bevel on the left back corner of the laptop and exposed metal hinges, a feature that would be present on most subsequent ThinkPads released.

==== R31 ====
The ThinkPad R31 came in 2 display options: an XGA 13.3" or 14.1" and is a minor internal hardware revision bringing socketed processors, a new chipset which meant a new CPU generation, and the IBM Embedded Security Subsystem to the R series. Although the dimensions were the same, with these new additions, the weight of the laptop was increased by about 0.1 kg (0.2 lb).

==== R32 ====
The ThinkPad R32 came in 2 display options: an XGA 13.3" or 14.1", but despite being named as a minor revision to the R3x generation, like most other IBM ThinkPads with their generations, the last model in this generation saw major revisions to the internals and some minor changes to the exterior. These revisions include: using Mobile Pentium 4-M CPUs instead of Mobile Pentium 3-M, Using DDR-266 RAM instead of PC-133 SDRAM, and a reworked motherboard with rearranged components along with the addition of battery terminals for an UltraBay battery.

| Model | Release (US) | Dimensions^{(w, d, h)} | Weight^{(min)} | CPU | Chipset | Memory ^{(max)} | Graphics | Storage | Networking | Audio | Screen | Battery | Other | Operating System |
|---|---|---|---|---|---|---|---|---|---|---|---|---|---|---|
| R30 | Oct 2001 | 313 × 254 × 36 mm (12.3 × 10 × 1.4") | 2.68 kg (5.9 lb) | Intel Mobile Celeron or Mobile Pentium III^{(Coppermine)} FSB: 100MT/s | ALi CyberBLADE ALADDiN i1 | 1GB^{(2x PC133 SDR SO-DIMM)} | Trident CyberBLADE ALADDiN i1^{(8MB shared)} | One UltraBay Plus, (Note: UltraBay does not support hot or warmswapping); One 2.5" IDE | Intel 82550GY^{10/100 Ethernet} Optional IBM High Rate Wireless LAN with Modem^{in Mini-PCI slot} Optional Agere LU97 Scorpio^{AC'97 modem card in CDC slot (exclusive)} | Intel AC'97 2.2 Audio with a Realtek ALC200 | CCFL backlit 1024x768(XGA) TN TFT LCD for both 13.3" and 14.1" | M(8) (Note: 8 cell option is an 8 cell NiMH battery) (Note: UltraBay does not have battery terminals) | One White ThinkLight Supports ^{ThinkPad Port Replicator; ThinkPad Port Replicator II; ThinkPad Mini-Dock} | |
| R31 | Feb 2002 | 313 × 254 × 36 mm (12.3 × 10 × 1.4") | 2.77 kg (6.1 lb) | Intel Mobile Celeron or Mobile Pentium 3-M^{(Tutalin)} FSB: 133MT/s | Intel 830MG | 1GB^{(2x PC133 SDR SO-DIMM)} | Intel Extreme Graphics^{(32MB shared)} | One UltraBay Plus, One 2.5" IDE | Intel 82562ET^{10/100 Ethernet} Optional IBM High Rate Wireless LAN with Modem^{in Mini-PCI slot} Optional Agere LU97 Scorpio^{AC'97 modem card in CDC slot (exclusive)} | Intel AC'97 2.1 Audio with an Analog Devices AD1881A SoundMAX | CCFL backlit 1024x768(XGA) TN TFT LCD for both 13.3" and 14.1" | M(8) | One White ThinkLight Supports ^{ThinkPad Port Replicator; ThinkPad Port Replicator II; ThinkPad Mini-Dock} | |
| R32 | Jun 2002 | 313 × 254 × 38 mm (12.3 × 10 × 1.5") | 2.81 kg (6.2 lb) | Intel Mobile Celeron or Pentium 4-M^{(Northwood)} FSB: 400MT/s | Intel 845MP | 1GB^{(2x DDR-266 SO-DIMM)} | ATI Mobility Radeon 7000 (Note: In IBM Hardware Maintenance Manuals, the ATI Mobility Radeon 7000 is called the M6)^{(8/16MB)} | One UltraBay Plus, One 2.5" IDE | Intel 82562ET^{10/100 Ethernet} Optional IBM High Rate Wireless LAN with Modem I or II or Cisco Aironet Wireless 802.11b^{in Mini-PCI slot} Optional Agere LU97 Scorpio^{AC'97 modem card in CDC slot (exclusive)} | Intel AC'97 2.1 Audio with an Analog Devices AD1881A SoundMAX | CCFL backlit 1024x768(XGA) TN TFT LCD for both 13.3" and 14.1" | M(6); U | One White ThinkLight Supports ^{ThinkPad Port Replicator; ThinkPad Port Replicator II; ThinkPad Mini-Dock} | |

=== 2003 ===
==== R40 ====
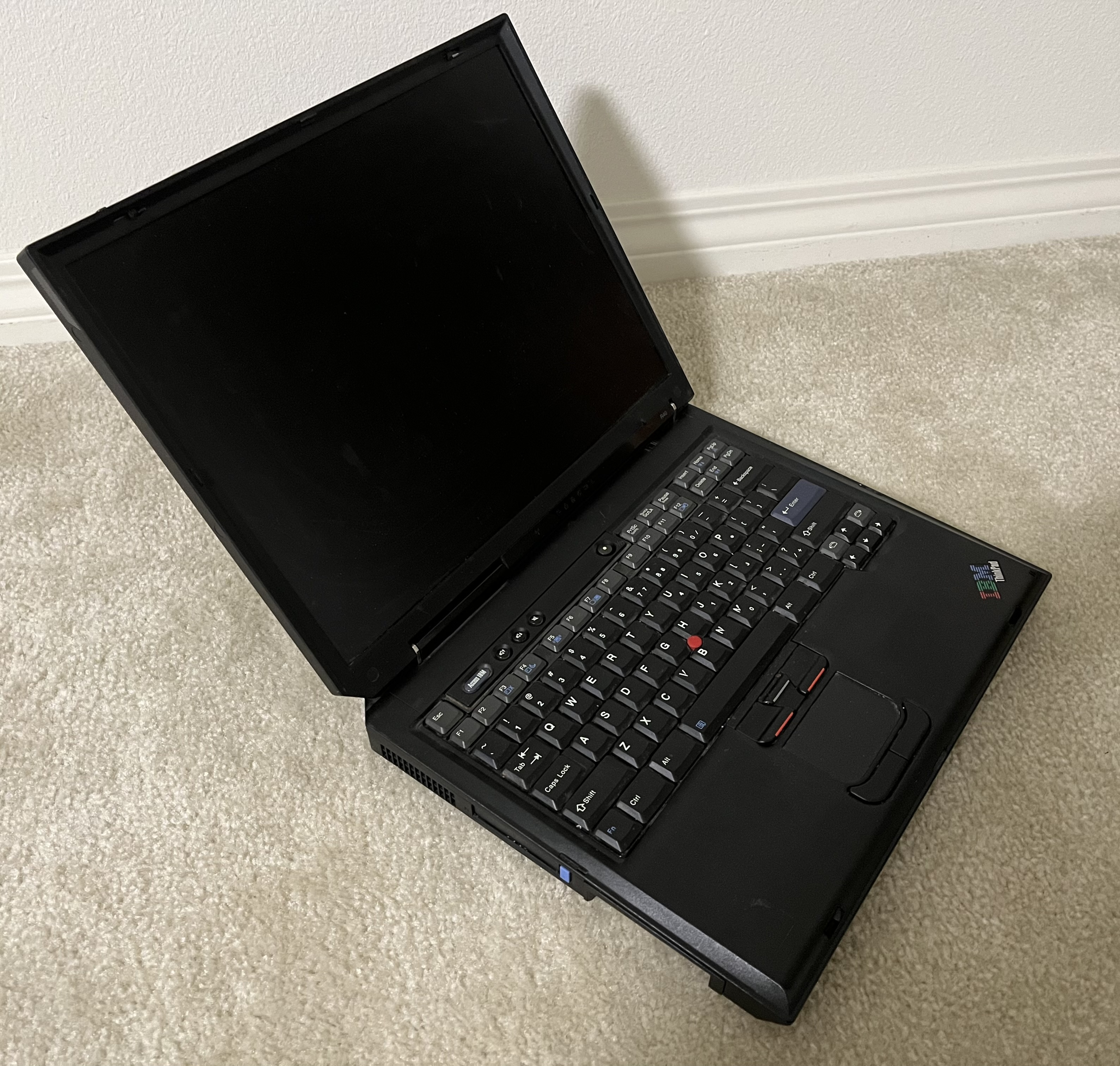
IBM ThinkPad R40 15"

The ThinkPad R40 came in 4 display options and 2 different body types: an XGA 13.3" or 14.1" in the 14" body type and either an XGA or an SXGA+ 15.0" in the 15" body type and was a sort of facelift to the previous R32, keeping the core design the same the (It looks more similar to the R32 than the R32 to the R31 from the bottom). This was the first R series ThinkPad to have the options for an UltraNav trackpad, a 15" display with a higher resolution 1400x1050 SXGA+ display panel, and Bluetooth. This was the first R series ThinkPad to have USB 2.0 and a hot-swappable UltraBay included.

==== R40e ====
The ThinkPad R40e came in 2 display options: an XGA 13.3" or 14.1" and was the budget version of the R40. With the budget status came the removal of the UltraBay (having a screwed in place optical drive), docking connector, the S-Video out port, 4 pin FireWire 400 port, and IrDA 1.1 port, and the second speaker. It was also unable to be optioned with Bluetooth, a 15" screen, Pentium M processors, or trackpad.

| Model | Release (US) | Dimensions^{(w, d, h)} | Weight^{(min)} | CPU | Chipset | Memory ^{(max)} | Graphics | Storage | Networking | Audio | Screen | Battery | Other | Operating System |
|---|---|---|---|---|---|---|---|---|---|---|---|---|---|---|
| R40(14") | Jan 2003 | 313 × 254 × 38 mm (12.3 × 10 × 1.5 in) | 2.81 kg (6.2 lb) | Intel or Mobile Celeron or Mobile Pentium 4-M^{(Northwood)} or Pentium M^{(Banias)} FSB: 400MT/s | Intel 855PM (Note: Only R40s optioned with a Pentium M processor had the 855PM Chipset) or 845MP | 2GB^{(2x DDR-266 SO-DIMM)} | ATI Mobility Radeon 7000^{(16MB)} or 7500 (Note: In IBM Hardware Maintenance Manuals, the ATI Mobility Radeon 7500 is called the M7)^{(32MB)} | One UltraBay Plus, One 2.5" IDE | Intel 82562EZ^{10/100 Ethernet} Agere LU97 Scorpio^{AC'97 modem card in CDC slot} Optional 802.11b Wireless LAN; Optional Bluetooth 1.1 | | CCFL backlit 1024x768(XGA) TN TFT LCD for both 13" and 14" | M(6); U | One White ThinkLight; Option for Trackpad Supports ^{ThinkPad Port Replicator II; ThinkPad Mini-Dock} | |
| R40(15") | Jan 2003 | 330 × 268 × 41 mm (13 × 10.6 × 1.6 in) | 3.04 kg (6.7 lb) | Intel or Mobile Celeron or Mobile Pentium 4-M^{(Northwood)} or Pentium M^{(Banias)} FSB: 400MT/s | Intel 855PM or 845MP | 2GB^{(2x DDR-266 SO-DIMM)} | ATI Mobility Radeon 7000^{(16MB)} or 7500^{(32MB)} | One UltraBay Plus, One 2.5" IDE | Intel 82562EZ^{10/100 Ethernet} Agere LU97 Scorpio^{AC'97 modem card in CDC slot} Optional 802.11b Wireless LAN; Optional Bluetooth 1.1 | | CCFL backlit 1024x768(XGA) or 1400x1050(SXGA+) TN TFT LCD | M(6); U | One White ThinkLight; Option for Trackpad Supports ^{ThinkPad Port Replicator II; ThinkPad Mini-Dock} | |
| R40e | Mar 2003 | 313 × 254 × 38 mm (12.3 × 10 × 1.5 in) | 2.72 kg (6.0 lb) | Intel Mobile Celeron or Mobile Pentium 4-M^{(Northwood)} FSB: 400MT/s | ATI RS200M | 1GB^{(2x DDR-266 SO-DIMM)} | ATI 330M IGP | One 2.5" IDE | Broadcom BCM5901^{10/100 Ethernet} Agere LU97 Scorpio^{AC'97 modem card in CDC slot} Optional 802.11b Wireless LAN | | CCFL backlit 1024x768(XGA) TN TFT LCD for both 13" and 14" | M(6) | One White ThinkLight | |

=== 2003-2004 ===
==== R50 ====
With a new number in the middle also came with a new design. This time instead of coming up with a brand new design for the R series, the T series design for the T40 had its magnesium midframe removed, became thicker to maintain stiffness, and a few styling details were changed to create the new design of the R50. The R50 came in 3 display options: an XGA TN 14.1" or either a XGA TN or an SXGA+ IPS 15".

==== R50p ====
The R50p came in 2 display options: either a UXGA IPS or a QXGA IPS 15". This was released as an indirect successor for the Axxp series of ThinkPads as there was no 15" version of the T40 or 41 to create a 15" Txxp model at this time.

==== R50e ====
The R50e came in 2 display options: XGA TN 14.1" or 15".

==== R51 ====
The R51 came in 3 display options: an XGA TN 14.1" or either a XGA TN or an SXGA+ IPS 15".

==== R51e ====
The R51e came in 2 display options: XGA TN 14.1" or 15". This was the first R series model released by Lenovo in September 2005.

==== R52 ====
Note: (Note: There is no such thing as an "R52e" one look at the IBM or Lenovo Product Specifications Reference book can show that)

The R52 came in 3 display options: an XGA TN 14.1" or either a XGA TN or an SXGA+ TN 15" and was the first model to use DDR2 memory. From this model on, the R series was unable to be optioned with an IPS display until the new E series based R series models.

| Model | Release (US) | Dimensions^{(w, d, h)} | Weight^{(min)} | CPU | Chipset | Memory^{(max)} | Graphics | Storage | Networking | Audio | Screen | Battery | Other | Operating System |
|---|---|---|---|---|---|---|---|---|---|---|---|---|---|---|
| R50(14") | Oct 2003 | 314 × 260 × 37 mm (12.4 × 10.2 × 1.46") | 2.6 kg (5.7 lb) | Intel Pentium M^{(Banias)} FSB: 400MT/s | Intel 855PM | 2GB^{(2x DDR-333 SO-DIMM)} | ATI Mobility Radeon 7500 or 9000^{32MB (both)} | One UltraBay Enhanced, One 2.5" IDE | Intel 82540EP^{Gigabit} or 82562EZ^{10/100 Ethernet} Agere LU97 Scorpio^{AC'97 with optional Bluetooth 1.1 modem card in CDC slot} Optional 802.11b or g ^{Wireless LAN in Mini PCI slot} | Intel AC'97 2.3 Audio with an Analog Devices AD1981B SoundMAX | CCFL backlit 1024x768(XGA) TN TFT LCD | M(9); U | One Amber ThinkLight Option for Trackpad Supports ^{ThinkPad Port Replicator II; ThinkPad Mini-Dock; Thinkpad Dock II} | |
| R50(15") | Oct 2003 | 332 × 269 × 40 mm (13.1 × 10.6 × 1.58") | 3.0 kg (6.6 lb) | Intel Pentium M^{(Banias)} FSB: 400MT/s | Intel 855PM | 2GB^{(2x DDR-333 SO-DIMM)} | ATI Mobility Radeon 7500 or 9000^{32MB (both)} | One UltraBay Enhanced, One 2.5" IDE | Intel 82540EP^{Gigabit} or 82562EZ^{10/100 Ethernet} Agere LU97 Scorpio^{AC'97 with optional Bluetooth 1.1 modem card in CDC slot} Optional 802.11b or g ^{Wireless LAN in Mini PCI slot} | Intel AC'97 2.3 Audio with an Analog Devices AD1981B SoundMAX | CCFL backlit 1024x768(XGA) TN or 1400x1050(SXGA+) IPS TFT LCD | M(9); U | One Amber ThinkLight Option for Trackpad Supports ^{ThinkPad Port Replicator II; ThinkPad Mini-Dock; Thinkpad Dock II} | |
| R50p | Nov 2003 | 332 × 269 × 40 mm (13.1 × 10.6 × 1.58") | 3.2 kg (7.1 lb) | Intel Pentium M^{(Banias)} FSB: 400MT/s | Intel 855PM | 2GB^{(2x DDR-333 SO-DIMM)} | ATI Mobility Radeon FireGL T2^{128MB} | One UltraBay Enhanced, One 2.5" IDE | Intel 82540EP^{Gigabit Ethernet} Agere LU97 Scorpio modem with Bluetooth 1.1^{in CDC slot} 802.11b or g Wireless LAN^{In Mini-PCI slot} | | CCFL backlit 1600x1200(UXGA) or 2048x1536(QXGA) IPS TFT LCD | M(9); U | One Amber ThinkLight Trackpad^{as standard} Supports ^{ThinkPad Port Replicator II; ThinkPad Mini-Dock; Thinkpad Dock II} | |
| R50e (14") | Apr 2004 | 314 × 260 × 37 mm (12.4 × 10.2 × 1.46") | 2.7 kg (6.0 lb) | Intel Celeron M^{(Banias)} or Pentium M^{(Dothan) (Note: The Dothan Pentium M option was released later in July 2004)} FSB: 400MT/s | Intel 855GM | 2GB^{(2x DDR-266 SO-DIMM)} | Intel Extreme Graphics 2^{(64MB Shared)} | One 2.5" IDE | Intel 82562EZ^{10/100 Ethernet} Conexant SmartV.92 56K Modem^{in CDC Slot} 802.11b or g Wireless LAN^{In Mini-PCI slot} | | CCFL backlit 1024x768(XGA) TN TFT LCD | M(9) | One Amber ThinkLight | |
| R50e (15") | Apr 2004 | 332 × 269 × 40 mm (13.1 × 10.6 × 1.58") | 3.0 kg (6.6 lb) | Intel Celeron M^{(Banias)} or Pentium M^{(Dothan)} FSB: 400MT/s | Intel 855GM | 2GB^{(2x DDR-266 SO-DIMM)} | Intel Extreme Graphics 2^{(64MB Shared)} | One 2.5" IDE | Intel 82562EZ^{10/100 Ethernet} Conexant SmartV.92 56K Modem^{in CDC Slot} 802.11b or g Wireless LAN^{In Mini-PCI slot} | | CCFL backlit 1024x768(XGA) TN TFT LCD | M(9) | One Amber ThinkLight | |
| R51 (14") | Apr 2004 | 314 × 260 × 37 mm (12.4 × 10.2 × 1.46") | 2.7 kg (6.0 lb) | Intel Celeron or Pentium M^{(Banias)} or Pentium M^{(Dothan)} FSB: 400MT/s | Intel 855GME | 2GB^{(2x DDR-333 SO-DIMM)} | Intel Extreme Graphics 2 (Note: This needs a separate BIOS from the rest of the models)^{(64MB Shared)} ATI Mobility Radeon 7500 or 9000^{32MB (both)} | One UltraBay Enhanced, One 2.5" IDE | Intel 82540EP^{Gigabit} or 82562EZ^{10/100 Ethernet} Conexant SmartV.92^{modem card with optional Bluetooth 1.1 in CDC slot} Optional 802.11b or g ^{Wireless LAN in Mini PCI slot} | | CCFL backlit 1024x768(XGA) TN TFT LCD | M(9); U | One Amber ThinkLight Option for Trackpad Supports ^{ThinkPad Port Replicator II; ThinkPad Mini-Dock; Thinkpad Dock II} | |
| R51 (15") | Apr 2004 | 332 × 269 × 40 mm (13.1 × 10.6 × 1.58") | 3.0 kg (6.6 lb) | Intel Celeron or Pentium M^{(Banias)} or Pentium M^{(Dothan)} FSB: 400MT/s | Intel 855GME | 2GB^{(2x DDR-333 SO-DIMM)} | Intel Extreme Graphics 2^{(64MB Shared)} ATI Mobility Radeon 7500 or 9000^{32MB (both)} | One UltraBay Enhanced, One 2.5" IDE | Intel 82540EP^{Gigabit} or 82562EZ^{10/100 Ethernet} Conexant SmartV.92^{modem card with optional Bluetooth 1.1 in CDC slot} Optional 802.11b or g ^{Wireless LAN in Mini PCI slot} | | CCFL backlit 1024x768(XGA) TN or 1400x1050(SXGA+) IPS TFT LCD | M(9); U | One Amber ThinkLight Option for Trackpad Supports ^{ThinkPad Port Replicator II; ThinkPad Mini-Dock; Thinkpad Dock II} | |
| R51e (14") | Sep 2004 | 314 × 260 × 37 mm (12.4 × 10.2 × 1.46") | 2.8 kg (6.2 lb) | Intel Celeron M or Pentium M^{(Dothan)} FSB: 533MT/s | ATI RC410MD | 2GB^{(2x DDR2-533 SO-DIMM)} | ATI Radeon Xpress 200M^{(64MB (Note: When system memory is less than 511MB, the GPU will only use up to 32MB of system memory) shared)} | One 2.5" IDE | Broadcom BCM5751F^{10/100 Ethernet} Conexant SmartV.92^{modem card in CDC slot} Optional 802.11b or g Wireless LAN^{In Mini-PCI slot} | | CCFL backlit 1024x768(XGA) TN TFT LCD | M(9) | One Amber ThinkLight | |
| R51e (15") | Sep 2004 | 332 × 269 × 40 mm (13.1 × 10.6 × 1.58") | 3.0 kg (6.6 lb) | Intel Celeron M or Pentium M^{(Dothan)} FSB: 533MT/s | ATI RC410MD | 2GB^{(2x DDR2-533 SO-DIMM)} | ATI Radeon Xpress 200M^{(64MB shared)} | One 2.5" IDE | Broadcom BCM5751F^{10/100 Ethernet} Conexant SmartV.92^{modem card in CDC slot} Optional 802.11b or g Wireless LAN^{In Mini-PCI slot} | | CCFL backlit 1024x768(XGA) TN TFT LCD | M(9) | One Amber ThinkLight | |
| R52 (14") | Oct 2004 | 314 × 260 × 37 mm (12.4 × 10.2 × 1.46") | 2.8 kg (6.2 lb) | Intel Celeron M or Pentium M^{(Dothan)} FSB: 533MT/s | Intel 915PM or 910GML or 915GM | 2GB^{(2x DDR2-533 SO-DIMM)} | ATI Mobility Radeon X300^{(32 or 64MB)} Intel Graphics Media Accelerator 900^{(128MB shared)} | One UltraBay Enhanced, One 2.5" IDE | Broadcom BCM5751M^{Gigabit Ethernet} Conexant SmartV.92^{modem card with optional Bluetooth 1.2 in CDC slot} Optional 802.11b or g Wireless LAN^{In Mini-PCI slot} | | CCFL backlit 1024x768(XGA) TN TFT LCD | M(9); U | One Amber ThinkLight Option for Trackpad Supports ^{ThinkPad Port Replicator II; ThinkPad Mini-Dock; Thinkpad Dock II} | |
| R52(15") | Oct 2004 | 332 × 269 × 40 mm (13.1 × 10.6 × 1.58") | 3.0 kg (6.6 lb) | Intel Celeron M or Pentium M^{(Dothan)} FSB: 533MT/s | Intel 915PM or 910GML or 915GM | 2GB^{(2x DDR2-533 SO-DIMM)} | ATI Mobility Radeon X300^{(32 or 64MB)} Intel Graphics Media Accelerator 900^{(128MB shared)} | One UltraBay Enhanced, One 2.5" IDE | Broadcom BCM5751M^{Gigabit Ethernet} Conexant SmartV.92^{modem card with optional Bluetooth 1.2 in CDC slot} Optional 802.11b or g Wireless LAN^{In Mini-PCI slot} | | CCFL backlit 1024x768(XGA) or 1400x1050(SXGA+) TN TFT LCD | M(9); U | One Amber ThinkLight Option for Trackpad Supports ^{ThinkPad Port Replicator II; ThinkPad Mini-Dock; Thinkpad Dock II} | |

=== 2005-2008 ===
==== R60 ====
The R60 came in 4 display options: either a XGA or an SXGA+ TN panel for both 14.1 and 15". A new number in the middle meant a redesign with this design being based on the T60 released two months prior. This was the first R series model to use a SATA hard drive rather than IDE and while the previous R52 technically had SATA run to the hard drive, it was adapted to IDE in order to maintain compatibility with previous models and to cut cost on the hard drive.

==== R60i ====
The R60i came in 4 display options: either a XGA or an SXGA+ TN panel for both 14.1 and 15" and was only offered in the Chinese market.

==== R60e ====
The R60e came in 1 display option: a XGA TN 15".

==== R61 ====
The ThinkPad's transition from 4:3 to the wider aspect ratio of 16:10, started in 2005 right after Lenovo had acquired the Thinkpad brand with the Z Series, had now begun affecting the R series. Although the R60 series was unaffected, starting with the R61, the R series, too would transition to 16:10. So the R61 came in 6 (maybe 8) (Note: Although on Lenovo's website it says that there was 2 different options for 14.1" 4:3, on the same page, it never lists the dimensions of that 14.1" 4:3) display options: an XGA or SXGA+ 15" 4:3 (Note: The 15" 4:3 models were not available in the US, instead only available in Europe and Asia), a WXGA 14.1" or 15.4" 16:10, a WXGA+ 14.1" 16:10, or a WSXGA+ 15.4" 16:10. If Lenovo's source is to be believed, either an XGA or SXGA+ 14" 4:3 were also available. This generation of ThinkPad also received the magnesium rollcage similar to the one on the T series. That along with the T series also receiving 4-pin FireWire continued to narrow the differences between the T and R series of laptops.

==== R61i ====
The R61i came in 7 display options: an XGA or SXGA+ TN 15", a WXGA TN in either 14.1" or 15.4" with both also able to be glossy, or a WXGA+ TN 14.1". It was a budget configuration of the R61, being practically the same laptop, just without some high end options such as a discrete GPU or WWAN. Along with that, it most crucially has the option for being touchpadless unlike the regular R61.

==== R61e ====
The R61e came in 1 display option: a WXGA TN 15.4".

==== R61u ====
The R61u came in 4 display options: a WXGA TN 14.1" or 15.4", a WXGA+ TN 14.1", or a WSXGA+ TN 15.4". Contrary to its name, it is not a slimmer version of the R61 but instead was just the same computer but only available for schools.

| Model | Release (US) | Dimensions^{(w, d, h)} | Weight^{(min)} | CPU | Chipset | Memory^{(max)} | Graphics | Storage | Networking | Audio | Screen | Battery | Other | Operating System |
|---|---|---|---|---|---|---|---|---|---|---|---|---|---|---|
| R60 (14") | May 2005 | 314 × 260 × 37.2 mm (12.4 × 10.2 × 1.46 in) | 2.8 kg (6.2 lb) | Intel Celeron M or Core Solo or Duo^{(Yonah)} or Core 2 Duo^{(Merom)} FSB: 667MT/s | Intel 945GM | 3GB (Note: Due to chipset limitations, the system will take 4GB but will only ever use 3GB, even with a 64-bit processor)^{(2x DDR2-667 SO-DIMM)} | Intel Graphics Media Accelerator 950 or ATI Mobility Radeon X1300^{(64MB)} or X1400^{(128MB); Up to 512MB shared} | One UltraBay Enhanced, One 2.5" SATA I | Intel 82573 or Broadcom BCM5751M^{Gigabit Ethernet} Conexant CSM92-SP^{modem card in CDC Slot} Optional 802.11g or n Wireless LAN^{in Mini-PCIe Slot} Optional Wireless WAN^{in Mini-PCIe Slot} Optional Bluetooth 2.0^{On Display Cable} | Intel HD Audio with AD1981HD | CCFL backlit 1024x768(XGA) or 1400x1050(SXGA+) TN TFT LCD | M(9); U | One Amber ThinkLight Option for Trackpad Supports ^{ThinkPad Essential Port Replicator; ThinkPad Advanced Mini-Dock; ThinkPad Advanced Dock} | |
| R60 (15") | May 2005 | 332 × 269 × 40 mm (13.1 × 10.6 × 1.58 in) | 3.1 kg (6.8 lb) | Intel Celeron M or Core Solo or Duo^{(Yonah)} or Core 2 Duo^{(Merom)} FSB: 667MT/s | Intel 945GM | 3GB^{(2x DDR2-667 SO-DIMM)} | Intel Graphics Media Accelerator 950 or ATI Mobility Radeon X1300^{(64MB)} or X1400^{(128MB); Up to 512MB shared} | One UltraBay Enhanced, One 2.5" SATA I | Intel 82573 or Broadcom BCM5751M^{Gigabit Ethernet} Conexant CSM92-SP^{modem card in CDC Slot} Optional 802.11g or n Wireless LAN^{in Mini-PCIe Slot} Optional Wireless WAN^{in Mini-PCIe Slot} Optional Bluetooth 2.0^{On Display Cable} | | CCFL backlit 1024x768(XGA) or 1400x1050(SXGA+) TN TFT LCD | M(9); U | One Amber ThinkLight Option for Trackpad Supports ^{ThinkPad Essential Port Replicator; ThinkPad Advanced Mini-Dock; ThinkPad Advanced Dock} | |
| R60i (14") | Never in US^{(Nov 2006 in China)} | 314 × 260 × 37.2 mm (12.4 × 10.2 × 1.46 in) | 2.8 kg (6.2 lb) | Intel Pentium Dual Core or Core Duo^{(Yonah)} or Core 2 Duo^{(Merom)} FSB: 667MT/s | Intel 945GM | 3GB^{(2x DDR2-667 SO-DIMM)} | Intel Graphics Media Accelerator 950 or ATI Mobility Radeon X1300^{(64MB)} or X1400^{(128MB); Up to 512MB shared} | One UltraBay Enhanced, One 2.5" SATA I | Broadcom BCM5751M^{Gigabit Ethernet} Conexant CSM92-SP^{modem card in CDC Slot} Optional 802.11g or n Wireless LAN^{in Mini-PCIe Slot} Optional Wireless WAN^{in Mini-PCIe Slot} Optional Bluetooth 2.0^{On Display Cable} | | CCFL backlit 1024x768(XGA) or 1400x1050(SXGA+) TN TFT LCD | M(9); U | One Amber ThinkLight Option for Trackpad Supports ^{ThinkPad Essential Port Replicator; ThinkPad Advanced Mini-Dock; ThinkPad Advanced Dock} | |
| R60i (15") | Never in US^{(Nov 2006 in China)} | 332 × 269 × 40 mm (13.1 × 10.6 × 1.58 in) | 3.2 kg (7.1 lb) | Intel Pentium Dual Core or Core Duo^{(Yonah)} or Core 2 Duo^{(Merom)} FSB: 667MT/s | Intel 945GM | 3GB^{(2x DDR2-667 SO-DIMM)} | Intel Graphics Media Accelerator 950 or ATI Mobility Radeon X1300^{(64MB)} or X1400^{(128MB); Up to 512MB shared} | One UltraBay Enhanced, One 2.5" SATA I | Broadcom BCM5751M^{Gigabit Ethernet} Conexant CSM92-SP^{modem card in CDC Slot} Optional 802.11g or n Wireless LAN^{in Mini-PCIe Slot} Optional Wireless WAN^{in Mini-PCIe Slot} Optional Bluetooth 2.0^{On Display Cable} | | CCFL backlit 1024x768(XGA) or 1400x1050(SXGA+) TN TFT LCD | M(9); U | One Amber ThinkLight Option for Trackpad Supports ^{ThinkPad Essential Port Replicator; ThinkPad Advanced Mini-Dock; ThinkPad Advanced Dock} | |
| R60e | May 2006 | 332 × 269 × 40.2 mm (13.1 × 10.6 × 1.58 in) | 2.8 kg (6.2 lb) | Intel Celeron M or Core Solo or Duo^{(Yonah)} or Core 2 Duo^{(Merom)} FSB: 667MT/s | Intel 940GML or 945GM | 940GML: 2GB^{(2x DDR2-533 SO-DIMM)} 945GM: 3GB^{(2x DDR2-667 SO-DIMM)} | Intel Graphics Media Accelerator 950; Speed:^{940GML:166MHZ; 945GM:250MHZ} | One 2.5" SATA I | Broadcom BCM5751M^{Gigabit Ethernet} Conexant CSM92-SP^{modem card in CDC Slot} Optional 802.11g or n Wireless LAN^{in Mini-PCIe Slot} | | CCFL backlit 1024x768(XGA) TN TFT LCD | M(9) | One Amber ThinkLight | |
| R61 (14" Wide) | May 2007 | 335.5 × 237 × 34.9 mm (13.2 × 9.3 × 1.37 in) | 2.4 kg (5.3 lb) | Intel Celeron^{(Merom)} or Core 2 Duo^{(Merom/Penryn)} FSB: 800MT/s | Intel GM965 or PM965 | 8GB^{(2x DDR2-667 SO-DIMM)} | Intel Graphics Media Accelerator X3100 or nVidia Quadro NVS 140M^{(128MB)} | One UltraBay Enhanced, One 2.5" SATA I (Note: SATA II speeds unlockable using modded BIOS) | Intel 82566M or Broadcom BCM5787M^{Gigabit Ethernet} Conexant CSM92-SP^{modem card in CDC Slot} Optional 802.11g or n Wireless LAN^{in Mini-PCIe Slot} Optional Wireless WAN^{in Mini-PCIe Slot} Optional Bluetooth 2.0^{On Display Cable} | | CCFL backlit 1280x800(WXGA) or 1440x900(WXGA+) TN TFT LCD | M(9) (Note: The 14" wide models use a different battery from all the other models); U | One Amber ThinkLight Trackpad Standard Option for 1.3MP Camera Supports ^{ThinkPad Essential Port Replicator; ThinkPad Advanced Mini-Dock; ThinkPad Advanced Dock} | |
| R61 (15") | May 2007 | 332 × 269 × 40 mm (13.1 × 10.6 × 1.58 in) | 2.8 kg (6.2 lb) | Intel Celeron^{(Merom)} or Core 2 Duo^{(Merom/Penryn)} FSB: 800MT/s | Intel GM965 or PM965 | 8GB^{(2x DDR2-667 SO-DIMM)} | Intel Graphics Media Accelerator X3100 or nVidia Quadro NVS 140M^{(128MB)} | One UltraBay Enhanced, One 2.5" SATA I | Intel 82566M or Broadcom BCM5787M^{Gigabit Ethernet} Conexant CSM92-SP^{modem card in CDC Slot} Optional 802.11g or n Wireless LAN^{in Mini-PCIe Slot} Optional Wireless WAN^{in Mini-PCIe Slot} Optional Bluetooth 2.0^{On Display Cable} | | CCFL backlit 1024x768(XGA) or 1400x1050(SXGA+) TN TFT LCD | M(9); U | One Amber ThinkLight Trackpad Standard Option for 1.3MP Camera Supports ^{ThinkPad Essential Port Replicator; ThinkPad Advanced Mini-Dock; ThinkPad Advanced Dock} | |
| R61 (15" Wide) | May 2007 | 358.5 × 260 × 38.5 mm (14.1 × 10.2 × 1.4 in) | 2.9 kg (6.4 lb) | Intel Celeron^{(Merom)} or Core 2 Duo^{(Merom/Penryn)} FSB: 800MT/s | Intel GM965 or PM965 | 8GB^{(2x DDR2-667 SO-DIMM)} | Intel Graphics Media Accelerator X3100 or nVidia Quadro NVS 140M^{(128MB)} | One UltraBay Enhanced, One 2.5" SATA I | Intel 82566M or Broadcom BCM5787M^{Gigabit Ethernet} Conexant CSM92-SP^{modem card in CDC Slot} Optional 802.11g or n Wireless LAN^{in Mini-PCIe Slot} Optional Wireless WAN^{in Mini-PCIe Slot} Optional Bluetooth 2.0^{On Display Cable} | | CCFL backlit 1280x800(WXGA) or 1680x1050(WSXGA+) TN TFT LCD | M(9); U | One Amber ThinkLight Trackpad Standard Option for 1.3MP Camera Supports ^{ThinkPad Essential Port Replicator; ThinkPad Advanced Mini-Dock; ThinkPad Advanced Dock} | |
| R61i (14" Wide) | Jul 2007 | 335.5 × 237 × 34.9 mm (13.2 × 9.3 × 1.37 in) | 2.4 kg (5.3 lb) | Intel Pentium Dual Core^{(Merom)} or Core 2 Duo^{(Merom/Penryn)} FSB: 800MT/s | Intel GM965 | 8GB^{(2x DDR2-667 SO-DIMM)} | Intel Graphics Media Accelerator X3100 | One UltraBay Enhanced, One 2.5" SATA I | Intel 82566M or Broadcom BCM5787M^{Gigabit Ethernet} Conexant CSM92-SP^{modem card in CDC Slot} Optional 802.11g or n Wireless LAN^{in Mini-PCIe Slot} Optional Bluetooth 2.0^{On Display Cable} | | CCFL backlit 1280x800(WXGA)^{(Optional Glossy)} or 1440x900(WXGA+) TN TFT LCD | M(9); U | One Amber ThinkLight Option for Trackpad Option for 1.3MP Camera Supports ^{ThinkPad Essential Port Replicator; ThinkPad Advanced Mini-Dock; ThinkPad Advanced Dock} | |
| R61i (15") | Jul 2007 | 332 × 269 × 40 mm (13.1 × 10.6 × 1.58 in) | 2.8 kg (6.2 lb) | Intel Pentium Dual Core^{(Merom)} or Core 2 Duo^{(Merom/Penryn)} FSB: 800MT/s | Intel GM965 | 8GB^{(2x DDR2-667 SO-DIMM)} | Intel Graphics Media Accelerator X3100 | One UltraBay Enhanced, One 2.5" SATA I | Intel 82566M or Broadcom BCM5787M^{Gigabit Ethernet} Conexant CSM92-SP^{modem card in CDC Slot} Optional 802.11g or n Wireless LAN^{in Mini-PCIe Slot} Optional Bluetooth 2.0^{On Display Cable} | | CCFL backlit 1024x768(WXGA) or 1400x1050(SXGA+) TN TFT LCD | M(9); U | One Amber ThinkLight Option for Trackpad Option for 1.3MP Camera Supports ^{ThinkPad Essential Port Replicator; ThinkPad Advanced Mini-Dock; ThinkPad Advanced Dock} | |
| R61i (15" Wide) | Jul 2007 | 358.5 × 260 × 38.5 mm (14.1 × 10.2 × 1.4 in) | 2.9 kg (6.4 lb) | Intel Pentium Dual Core^{(Merom)} or Core 2 Duo^{(Merom/Penryn)} FSB: 800MT/s | Intel GM965 | 8GB^{(2x DDR2-667 SO-DIMM)} | Intel Graphics Media Accelerator X3100 | One UltraBay Enhanced, One 2.5" SATA I | Intel 82566M or Broadcom BCM5787M^{Gigabit Ethernet} Conexant CSM92-SP^{modem card in CDC Slot} Optional 802.11g or n Wireless LAN^{in Mini-PCIe Slot} Optional Bluetooth 2.0^{On Display Cable} | | CCFL backlit 1280x800(WXGA)^{(Optional Glossy)} TN TFT LCD | M(9); U | One Amber ThinkLight Option for Trackpad Option for 1.3MP Camera Supports ^{ThinkPad Essential Port Replicator; ThinkPad Advanced Mini-Dock; ThinkPad Advanced Dock} | |
| R61e | Jul 2007 | 358.5 × 260 × 38.5 mm (14.1 × 10.2 × 1.4 in) | 2.9 kg (6.4 lb) | Intel Celeron or Core 2 Duo^{(Merom)} FSB: 800MT/s | Intel GM965 | 8GB^{(2x DDR2-667 SO-DIMM)} | Intel Graphics Media Accelerator X3100 | One 2.5" SATA I | Broadcom BCM5787M^{Gigabit Ethernet} Conexant CSM92-SP^{modem card in CDC Slot} Optional 802.11g or n Wireless LAN^{in Mini-PCIe Slot} | | CCFL backlit 1280x800(WXGA) TN TFT LCD | M(9) | One Amber ThinkLight | |
| R61u (14" wide) | Feb 2008 | 335 × 261 × 34.9 mm (13.2 × 10.2 × 1.37 in) | 2.5 kg (5.5 lb) | Intel Core 2 Duo^{(Penryn)} FSB: 800MT/s | Intel GM965 or PM965 | 8GB^{(2x DDR2-667 SO-DIMM)} | Intel Graphics Media Accelerator X3100 or nVidia Quadro NVS 140M^{(128MB)} | One UltraBay Enhanced, One 2.5" SATA I | Intel 82566M or Broadcom BCM5787M^{Gigabit Ethernet} Conexant CSM92-SP^{modem card in CDC Slot} Optional 802.11g or n Wireless LAN^{in Mini-PCIe Slot} Optional Bluetooth 2.0^{On Display Cable} | | CCFL backlit 1280x800(WXGA) or 1440x900(WXGA+) TN TFT LCD | M(9); U | One Amber ThinkLight Trackpad Standard Option for 1.3MP Camera Supports ^{ThinkPad Essential Port Replicator; ThinkPad Advanced Mini-Dock; ThinkPad Advanced Dock} | |
| R61u (15" wide) | Jan 2008 | 358.5 × 260 × 38.5 mm (14.1 × 10.2 × 1.4 in) | 2.9 kg (6.4 lb) | Intel Core 2 Duo^{(Penryn)} FSB: 800MT/s | Intel GM965 or PM965 | 8GB^{(2x DDR2-667 SO-DIMM)} | Intel Graphics Media Accelerator X3100 or nVidia Quadro NVS 140M^{(128MB)} | One UltraBay Enhanced, One 2.5" SATA I | Intel 82566M or Broadcom BCM5787M^{Gigabit Ethernet} Conexant CSM92-SP^{modem card in CDC Slot} Optional 802.11g or n Wireless LAN^{in Mini-PCIe Slot} Optional Bluetooth 2.0^{On Display Cable} | | CCFL backlit 1280x800(WXGA) or 1680x1050(WSXGA+) TN TFT LCD | M(9); U | One Amber ThinkLight Trackpad Standard Option for 1.3MP Camera Supports ^{ThinkPad Essential Port Replicator; ThinkPad Advanced Mini-Dock; ThinkPad Advanced Dock} | |

=== 2008-2010 ===
==== R400 ====
The R400 came in 2 display options: either a WXGA or a WXGA+ TN 14.1". This shared the same core design with the 14" widescreen R61 with only shifted around ports. This generation of ThinkPad R series also replaced UltraBay Enhanced which used PATA/IDE with Serial UltraBay Enhanced which used SATA. Though the slot is the same as the UltraBay Enhanced. So accessories such as UltraBay batteries for the previous UltraBay will work on this new UltraBay and vice versa. With this generation of Thinkpad R series, it became virtually indistinguishable both internally and externally with its T series equivalent. In fact, the R400 and the T400 share the same Hardware Maintenance Manual. It is likely that it is because of this similarity between the T series and the R series that it was eventually discontinued in 2010.

==== R500 ====
The R500 came in 2 display options: either a WXGA or a WSXGA+ TN 15.4". This shared the same core design with the 15" widescreen R61 with only shifted around ports.

| Model | Release (US) | Dimensions^{(w, d, h)} | Weight^{(min)} | CPU | Chipset | Memory^{(max)} | Graphics | Storage | Networking | Audio | Screen | Battery | Other | Operating System |
|---|---|---|---|---|---|---|---|---|---|---|---|---|---|---|
| R400 | Aug 2008 | 335.5 × 238 × 35 mm (13.2 × 9.4 × 1.4 in) | 2.3 kg (5.1 lb) | Intel Celeron^{(Merom L)} or Core 2 Duo^{(Merom or Penryn)} FSB: 1066MT/s | Intel GM45 | 8GB^{(2x DDR3-1066 SO-DIMM)} | Intel Graphics Media Accelerator X4500 or ATI Mobility Radeon HD3570^{(128MB or 256MB)} | One Serial UltraBay Enhanced, One 2.5" SATA II | Broadcom BCM5787M^{Gigabit Ethernet} Conexant CSM92-SP^{modem card in CDC Slot} 802.11n Wireless LAN^{in Mini-PCIe Slot} Optional Wireless WAN^{in MiniPCIe Slot} Optional Wireless USB^{in Mini-PCIe slot} Optional Bluetooth 2.1^{On Display Cable} | | CCFL backlit 1280x800(WXGA) or 1440x900(WXGA+) TN TFT LCD | M(9); U | One Amber ThinkLight UltraNav Trackpad Option for 1.3MP Camera Supports ^{ThinkPad Essential Port Replicator; ThinkPad Advanced Mini-Dock; ThinkPad Advanced Dock} | |
| R500 | Aug 2008 | 358.6 × 260 × 39 mm (14.1 × 10.2 × 1.5 in) | 2.93 kg (6.5 lb) | Intel Celeron^{(Merom L)} or Core 2 Duo^{(Merom or Penryn)} FSB: 1066MT/s | Intel GM45 | 8GB^{(2x DDR3-1066 SO-DIMM)} | Intel Graphics Media Accelerator X4500 or ATI Mobility Radeon HD3570^{(128MB or 256MB)} | One Serial UltraBay Enhanced, One 2.5" SATA II | Broadcom BCM5787M^{Gigabit Ethernet} Conexant CSM92-SP^{modem card in CDC Slot} 802.11n Wireless LAN^{in Mini-PCIe Slot} Optional Wireless WAN^{in MiniPCIe Slot} Optional Wireless USB^{in Mini-PCIe slot} Optional Bluetooth 2.1^{On Display Cable} | | CCFL backlit 1280x800(WXGA) or 1680x1050(WSXGA+) TN TFT LCD | M(9); U | One Amber ThinkLight UltraNav Trackpad Option for 1.3MP Camera Supports ^{ThinkPad Essential Port Replicator; ThinkPad Advanced Mini-Dock; ThinkPad Advanced Dock} | |

=== 2010-2017 ===
The R series was then discontinued and had a 7-year hiatus until 2017 when it was brought back only in China as a more premium E480.

== E series Based Models ==
ThinkPad R series (2017–Present)
| Screen | Type | Rx80 (2017) | Rx90 (2018) | 2019 | 2020 | 2021 | 2022 | 2023 | 2024 |
|---|---|---|---|---|---|---|---|---|---|
| 14" | Mainstream | R480 | R490 | R14 Gen 1 | R14 Gen 2 | R14 Gen 3 | R14 Gen 4 | R14 Gen 5 | R14 Gen 6 |
| 15" | Mainstream | R580 | R590 | R15 Gen 1 | R15 Gen 2 | | | | |

=== 2017 ===
==== R480 ====
The ThinkPad R480 came out in 2017 as a China exclusive, higher end version of the ThinkPad E480. It and every subsequent model is the same as the E Series equivalent except for having been optioned with higher end features. For this model, its distinguishing feature is the aluminum lid.

==== R580 ====
The ThinkPad R580 came out in 2017 and has the same differences from the E series as the R480 but instead of being based on the E480, it was based on the E580.

| Model | Release (China) | Dimensions^{(w, d, h)} | Weight^{(min)} | CPU | Chipset | Memory^{(max)} | Graphics | Storage | Networking | Audio | Screen | Battery | Other | Operating System |
|---|---|---|---|---|---|---|---|---|---|---|---|---|---|---|
| R480 | Nov 2017 | 329 × 242 × 19.9 mm (12.9 × 9.5 × 0.78 in) | 1.75 kg (3.9 lb) | 7th^{(Kaby Lake)} or 8th gen^{(Kaby Lake R)} U series Intel Core i3, i5, or i7 | Kaby Lake Intel SoC Chipset | 32GB^{(2x DDR4-2400 SO-DIMM)} | Intel HD graphics 620 or UHD Graphics 620 with Optional additional AMD Radeon 540^{(2GB GDDR5)} | One 2.5" SATA III, One M.2 x2 | Realtek RTL8111GUS^{Gigabit Ethernet} 802.11ac Wireless LAN+Bluetooth 4.1^{combo card in M.2 slot} | | LED Backlit 1366x768(HD) TN or 1920x1080(FHD) IPS TFT LCD | m(3); 45Wh | 720p Camera 1.8mm Travel Keyboard | |
| R580 (Note: I can't find any details about the R580. I know it exists. There are parts listings for the R580 and Lenovo driver documentation listing the R580 but there is no specifics on the actual machine. But seeing how the R480 and the E480 both weigh the same and have the same MT's, I will be guessing that Lenovo did the same with the R580 and so information given on the R580 will be from the E580. This will be the same for all following models that I know exist...just I can't find anything about.) | Nov 2017 | 369 × 252 × 19.95 mm (14.53 × 9.92 × 0.78 in) | 2.1 kg (4.6 lb) | 7th^{(Kaby Lake)} or 8th gen^{(Kaby Lake R)} U series Intel Core i3, i5, or i7 | Kaby Lake Intel SoC Chipset | 32GB^{(2x DDR4-2400 SO-DIMM)} | Intel HD graphics 620 or UHD Graphics 620 with Optional additional AMD Radeon 540^{(2GB GDDR5)} | One 2.5" SATA III, One M.2 x2 | Realtek RTL8111GUS^{Gigabit Ethernet} 802.11ac Wireless LAN+Bluetooth 4.1^{combo card in M.2 slot} | | LED Backlit 1366x768(HD) TN or 1920x1080(FHD) IPS | m(3); 45Wh | 720p Camera 1.8mm Travel Keyboard | |

=== 2018 ===
==== R490 ====
Just like the previous R480, the R490 was based on the E series of its time—for this case, the E490—changing almost nothing except having an aluminum lid and being a name upgrade just like the previous year. This was only offered in China and uses Whiskey Lake Intel U series processors.

==== R590 ====
The R590 is the 15 inch version of the R490 and was based on the E590 instead. Except the R590 had real physical difference as all E590s came with aluminum lids.

| Model | Release (China) | Dimensions^{(w, d, h)} | Weight^{(min)} | CPU | Chipset | Memory^{(max)} | Graphics | Storage | Networking | Audio | Screen | Battery | Other | Operating System |
|---|---|---|---|---|---|---|---|---|---|---|---|---|---|---|
| R490 | Dec 2018 | 329.3 × 242.8 × 19.9 mm (12.96 × 9.56 × 0.78 in) | 1.75 kg (3.9 lb) | Intel 8th gen^{(Whiskey Lake)} U series Core i3, i5, or i7 | Intel SoC Platform Chipset | 64GB^{(2x DDR4-2400 SO-DIMM)} | Intel UHD Graphics 620 with Optional additional AMD Radeon 540X^{(2GB GDDR5)} | One 2.5" SATA III, One M.2 x2 | Realtek RTL8111GUS^{Gigabit Ethernet} 802.11ac Wireless LAN+Bluetooth 4.1 or 5.1^{combo card in M.2 slot} | | LED Backlit 1366x768(HD) TN or 1920x1080(FHD) IPS TFT LCD | m(3); 45Wh | 720p Camera 1.8mm Travel Keyboard | |
| R590 | Dec 2018 | 369 × 252.5 × 19.9 mm (14.53 × 9.94 × 0.78 in) | 2.12 kg (4.7 lb) | Intel 8th gen^{(Whiskey Lake)} U series Core i3, i5, or i7 | Intel SoC Platform Chipset | 64GB^{(2x DDR4-2400 SO-DIMM)} | Intel UHD Graphics 620 with Optional additional AMD Radeon 540X^{(2GB GDDR5)} | One 2.5" SATA III, One M.2 x2 | Realtek RTL8111GUS^{Gigabit Ethernet} 802.11ac Wireless LAN+Bluetooth 4.1 or 5.1^{combo card in M.2 slot} | | LED Backlit 1366x768(HD) TN or 1920x1080(FHD) IPS | m(3); 45Wh | 720p Camera 1.8mm Travel Keyboard | |

=== 2019 ===
==== R14 Gen 1 ====
Along with other offerings from Lenovo starting in 2019, the R series changed to the new naming scheme of model letter, followed by screen size, with generation numbers to denote new models. So for the R14 Gen 1, it is the first generation 14 inch R Series ThinkPad. Just like the previous models of the new series, it is just a higher configuration model of the E series. However, in this case, is completely nonsensical as configurations of the E14 with both an aluminum lid and body exist while the R14 only has an aluminium lid and a plastic body.

==== R15 Gen 1 ====
This is the first generation of 15 inch R series ThinkPad based on the E15 gen 1.

| Model | Release (China) | Dimensions^{(w, d, h)} | Weight^{(min)} | CPU | Chipset | Memory^{(max)} | Graphics | Storage | Networking | Audip | Screen | Battery | Other | Operating System |
|---|---|---|---|---|---|---|---|---|---|---|---|---|---|---|
| R14 Gen 1 | Oct 2019 | 325 × 232 × 18.9 mm (12.8 × 9.13 × 0.74 in) | 1.69 kg (3.7 lb) | Intel 10th gen^{(Comet Lake)} U series Core i3, i5, or i7 | Intel SoC Platform Chipset | 32GB (Note: Apparently 64 DDR4 SO-DIMMs exist or at least they should exist but I have found none that are non-ECC)^{(1x DDR4-2666 SO-DIMM)} | Intel UHD Graphics 620 with Optional Additional AMD Radeon 625^{(2GB GDDR5)} | One 2.5" SATA III, One M.2 x4 | Realtek RTL8111GUS^{Gigabit Ethernet} 802.11ac or ax Wireless LAN+Bluetooth 5.0 or 5.1^{combo card in M.2 slot} | | LED Backlit 1920x1080(FHD) TN or IPS | m(3); 45Wh | 720p camera with optional ThinkShutter; 1.8 mm Travel Keyboard | |
| R15 Gen 1 | Oct 2019 | 368 × 245 × 18.9 mm (14.49 × 9.65 × 0.74 in) | 1.9 kg (4.2 lb) | Intel 10th gen^{(Comet Lake)} U series Core i3, i5, or i7 | Intel SoC Platform Chipset | 32GB^{(1x DDR4-2666 SO-DIMM)} | Intel UHD Graphics 620 with Optional Additional AMD Radeon 625^{(2GB GDDR5)} | One 2.5" SATA III, One M.2 x4 | Realtek RTL8111GUS^{Gigabit Ethernet} 802.11ac or ax Wireless LAN+Bluetooth 5.0 or 5.1^{combo card in M.2 slot} | | LED Backlit 1920x1080(FHD) TN or IPS | m(3); 45Wh | 720p camera with optional ThinkShutter; 1.8 mm Travel Keyboard | |

=== 2020 ===
==== R14 Gen 2 ====
Changes were minor with the second generation of ThinkPad R14. It shares essentially the same design as the first generation but updates the internals to 11th gen Intel and to include a second m.2 PCIe slot in exchange for the 2.5" SATA along with Thunderbolt 4 in place of the USB-C 3.0 and USB-A 3.0 port. This is based on the ThinkPad E14 Gen 2. This has both the aluminum lid and base.

==== R15 Gen 2 ====
This is the second and last generation of ThinkPad R15 based on the ThinkPad E15 Gen 2.

| Model | Release (China) | Dimensions^{(w, d, h)} | Weight^{(min)} | CPU | Chipset | Memory^{(max)} | Graphics | Storage | Networking | Audio | Screen | Battery | Other | Operating System |
|---|---|---|---|---|---|---|---|---|---|---|---|---|---|---|
| R14 Gen 2 | November 2020 | 324 × 220 × 17.9 mm (12.76 × 8.66 × 0.7 in) | 1.64 kg (3.6 lb) | Intel 11th gen^{(Tiger Lake)} G4/G7 series Core i3, i5, or i7 | Intel SoC Platform Chipset | 32GB^{(1x DDR4-3200 SO-DIMM)} | Intel UHD Graphics Xe or Iris Xe with Optional Additional NVIDIA Geforce MX350 or MX450^{(2GB GDDR5)} | Two M.2 x4 | Realtek RTL8111GUS^{Gigabit Ethernet} 802.11ac or ax Wireless LAN+Bluetooth 5.0 or 5.1^{soldered} | | LED Backlit 1920x1080(FHD) TN or IPS; Optional touch | m(3); 45Wh | 720p camera with optional ThinkShutter; One TB4; 1.8 mm Travel Keyboard | |
| R15 Gen 2 | November 2020 | 368 × 245 × 18.9 mm (14.49 × 9.65 × 0.74 in) | 1.7 kg (3.7 lb) | Intel 11th gen^{(Tiger Lake)} G4/G7 series Core i3, i5, or i7 | Intel SoC Platform Chipset | 32GB^{(1x DDR4-3200 SO-DIMM)} | Intel UHD Graphics Xe or Iris Xe with Optional Additional NVIDIA Geforce MX350 or MX450^{(2GB GDDR5)} | Two M.2 x4 | Realtek RTL8111GUS^{Gigabit Ethernet} 802.11ac or ax Wireless LAN+Bluetooth 5.0 or 5.1^{soldered} | | LED Backlit 1920x1080(FHD) TN or IPS; Optional touch | m(3); 45Wh | 720p camera with optional ThinkShutter; One TB4; 1.8 mm Travel Keyboard | |

=== 2021 ===
==== R14 Gen 3 ====
This is the 3rd generation of ThinkPad R14 based on the ThinkPad E14 Gen 3 using 5000 series Ryzen CPUs. There is no 15 inch model for this generation and there is no other model other than the 14 inch for all subsequent R series ThinkPads.

| Model | Release (China) | Dimensions^{(w, d, h)} | Weight^{(min)} | CPU | Chipset | Memory^{(max)} | Graphics | Storage | Networking | Audio | Screen | Battery | Other | Operating System |
|---|---|---|---|---|---|---|---|---|---|---|---|---|---|---|
| R14 Gen 3 (Note: Like I said in the footnotes on the R580, I will just be using the E series info on this.) | April 2021 | 324 × 220.7 × 17.9 mm (12.76 × 8.69 × 0.7 in) | 1.69 kg (3.7 lb) | AMD Ryzen 5000 Series^{(Zen 3)} U series Ryzen 3, 5, 5 Pro, 7 | AMD SoC Platform Chipset | 36/40GB^{(1x DDR4-3200 SODIMM + 4/8GB Soldered)} | AMD Radeon Graphics; Ryzen 3:^{Vega 6} Ryzen 5:^{Vega 7} Ryzen 7:^{Vega 8} | Two M.2 x4 | Realtek RTL8111GUS^{Gigabit Ethernet} 802.11ac or ax Wireless LAN+Bluetooth 5.1^{soldered} | | LED Backlit 1920x1080(FHD) TN or IPS | m(3); 45Wh; 57Wh | 720p camera with optional ThinkShutter; 1.8 mm Travel Keyboard | |

=== 2022 ===
==== R14 Gen 4 ====
This is the fourth generation of ThinkPad R14 based on the ThinkPad E14 Gen 4. This is the last R series ThinkPad to have a keyboard with 1.8mm of key travel.

| Model | Release (China) | Dimensions^{(w, d, h)} | Weight^{(min)} | CPU | Chipset | Memory^{(max)} | Graphics | Storage | Networking | Audio | Screen | Battery | Other | Operating System |
|---|---|---|---|---|---|---|---|---|---|---|---|---|---|---|
| R14 Gen 4 | April 2022 | 324 × 220 × 17.9 mm (12.76 × 8.66 × 0.7 in) | 1.64 kg (3.6 lb) | Intel 12th gen^{(Alder Lake)} U/P series Core i3, i5, or i7 | Intel SoC Platform Chipset | 40GB^{(1x DDR4-3200 SODIMM + 8GB Soldered)} | Intel UHD Graphics or Iris Xe with Optional Additional NVIDIA Geforce M550^{(2GB GDDR6)} | One M.2 3.0x4, One M.2 4.0x4 | Intel® Ethernet Connection I219-V^{Gigabit Ethernet} Wi-Fi 6 or 6E 802.11ax Wireless LAN+Bluetooth 5.1^{soldered} | | LED Backlit 1920x1080(FHD) TN or IPS; Optional touch | m(3); 45Wh; 57Wh | 720p camera with optional ThinkShutter; One TB4; 1.8 mm Travel Keyboard | Windows 11 Pro |

=== 2023 ===
==== R14 Gen 5 ====
This is the fifth generation of ThinkPad R14 based on the ThinkPad E14 Gen 5. This is the first generation to only have IPS displays offered, and the first generation to finally have a display option with more pixels per inch than the 2048x1536 15" panel offered on the R50p, at 188.68 PPI compared to 170.67. Although it does have a lower PPI, there are still more pixels on the QXGA panel of the R50p. It only loses on PPI due to it being a larger display.

| Model | Release (China) | Dimensions^{(w, d, h)} | Weight^{(min)} | CPU | Chipset | Memory^{(max)} | Graphics | Storage | Networking | Audio | Screen | Battery | Other | Operating System |
|---|---|---|---|---|---|---|---|---|---|---|---|---|---|---|
| R14 Gen 5 | April 2023 | 313 × 219.3 × 17.99 mm (12.32 × 8.63 × 0.71 in) | 1.43 kg (3.2 lb) | Intel 13th gen^{(Raptor Lake)} U/P/H series Core i3, i5, or i7 | Intel SoC Platform Chipset | 40/48GB^{(1x DDR4-3200 SODIMM + 8/16GB Soldered)} | Intel UHD Graphics or Iris Xe with Optional Additional NVIDIA Geforce M550^{(2GB GDDR6)} | One M.2 3.0x4, One M.2 4.0x4 | Intel Ethernet Connection I219-V^{Gigabit Ethernet} Wi-Fi 6 or 6E 802.11ax Wireless LAN+Bluetooth 5.2 or 5.3^{soldered} | | LED Backlit 1920x1200(WUXGA); Optional touch or 2240x1400(WQHD) IPS | m(3); 47Wh; 57Wh | 720p or 1080p camera with optional IR Camera; One TB4; 1.5 mm Travel Keyboard | Windows 11 Pro |

=== 2024 ===
==== R14 Gen 6 ====
This is the sixth generation of ThinkPad R14 based on the ThinkPad E14 gen 6. This is the first generation of R series ThinkPad to have 2 SODIMM slots since the Rx90 generation released in 2018.

| Model | Release (China) | Dimensions^{(w, d, h)} | Weight^{(min)} | CPU | Chipset | Memory^{(max)} | Graphics | Storage | Networking | Audio | Screen | Battery | Other | Operating System |
|---|---|---|---|---|---|---|---|---|---|---|---|---|---|---|
| R14 Gen 6 | March 2024 | 313 × 219.3 × 17.99 mm (12.32 × 8.63 × 0.71 in) | 1.44 kg (3.2 lb) | Intel 1st gen^{(Meteor Lake)} U/H series Core Ultra 5, or 7 | Intel SoC Platform Chipset | 96GB^{(2x DDR5-5600 SODIMM)} | Intel Graphics or Intel Arc Graphics (Note: Only systems with H series processors and 16GB RAM or more can have Arc Graphics. Otherwise, it's just regular Intel.) | One M.2 3.0x4, One M.2 4.0x4 | Intel Ethernet Connection I219-V or I219-LM^{(only on vPro models)}^{Gigabit Ethernet} Wi-Fi 6 or 6E 802.11ax Wireless LAN+Bluetooth 5.2 or 5.3^{soldered} | High Definition (HD) Audio with Senary SN6141, stereo speakers with Dolby Atmos, audio by HARMAN and dual-microphone array with smart noise-cancelling | LED Backlit 1920x1200(WUXGA); Optional touch or 2240x1400(WQHD) IPS | m(3); 47Wh; 57Wh | 720p or 1080p camera with optional IR Camera; One TB4; 1.5 mm Travel Keyboard | Windows 11 Pro |

=== 2025 ===
With the launch of the ThinkPad E14 Gen 7, the R series has once again been discontinued. The ThinkPad L14p Gen 6 now fills the role of being identical to the E14 except name and model number.
