= ThinkPad i Series =

Line of budget multimedia laptop computers

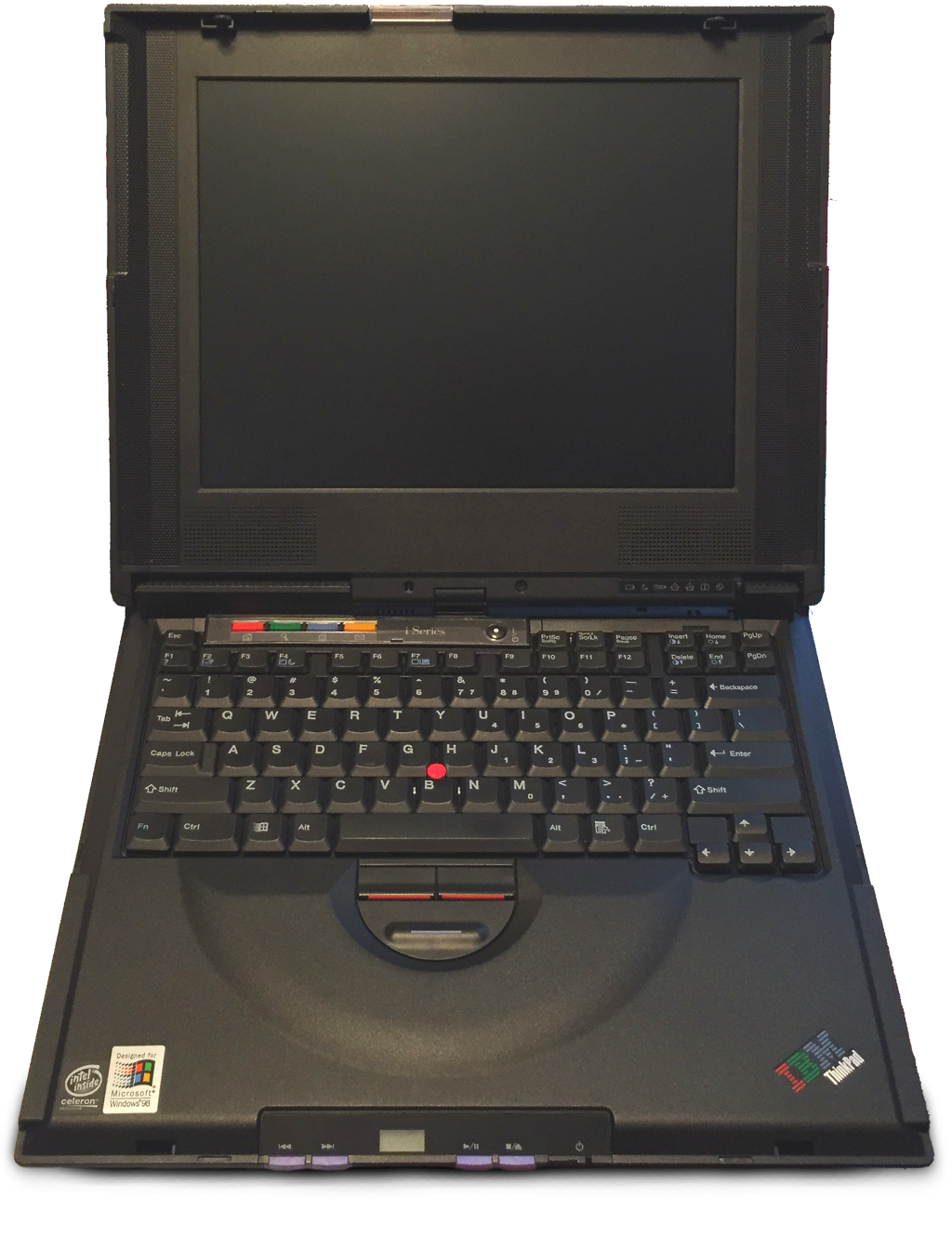
- Developer: IBM
- Manufacturer: IBM and Acer
- Product family: ThinkPad
- Website: ThinkPad i Series at the Wayback Machine (archived 2001-07-14)

The ThinkPad i Series is a group of IBM ThinkPad laptop computers that were manufactured from 1998 to 2002. These machines were an effort to address the desire for a personal entertainment device and small business users. They were designed and priced to be both for productivity and play. IBM desired to gain ground in the consumer market and created the i Series as an answer to their competitors.

While designed by IBM, several models of the i Series were manufactured by Acer on an OEM basis.

Several alternate names were considered for this series including "X Pad", "X Series", "TrekPad", and "Aptiva Note Personal Series." i Series was chosen with the "i" standing for individuals.

== Characteristics ==
David Hill who was the head of design for IBM Personal Systems Group led the design of the i Series. The design was informed by six research studies of the consumer mobile market.

The i Series team collaborated with Altec Lansing to design the speaker system to fit into the thinner chassis. The initial design was loosely based on the ThinkPad 600 with consumer features such as speakers mounted next to the display and front mounted optical drive controls.

The red, green, blue and yellow ShortCut Keys were an effort to make the traditional corporate design feel more personal.

The i Series introduced several items to the ThinkPad lineup including the ThinkLight. Several models featured CD/DVD playback capability and a 14.1" screen. The i Series was the first ThinkPads to feature wireless communications technology and the first notebook computer with an integrated antenna with a 802.11b WiFi radio.

== Reception ==
The ThinkPad i Series was generally well received. Reviewers would often note that the performance was not as good as more top of the line systems. The lightweight nature of the i Series was favoured by reviewers including photographers. Customers also appreciated how thin the device was built. One of the common complaints was the lack of port replicator support.

In 2004, IBM instigated a voluntary recall on 553,000 AC adapters, primarily bundled with i Series machines. These faulty units are labelled with the part number 02K6549. These are known to cause damage to internal components.

== Models ==
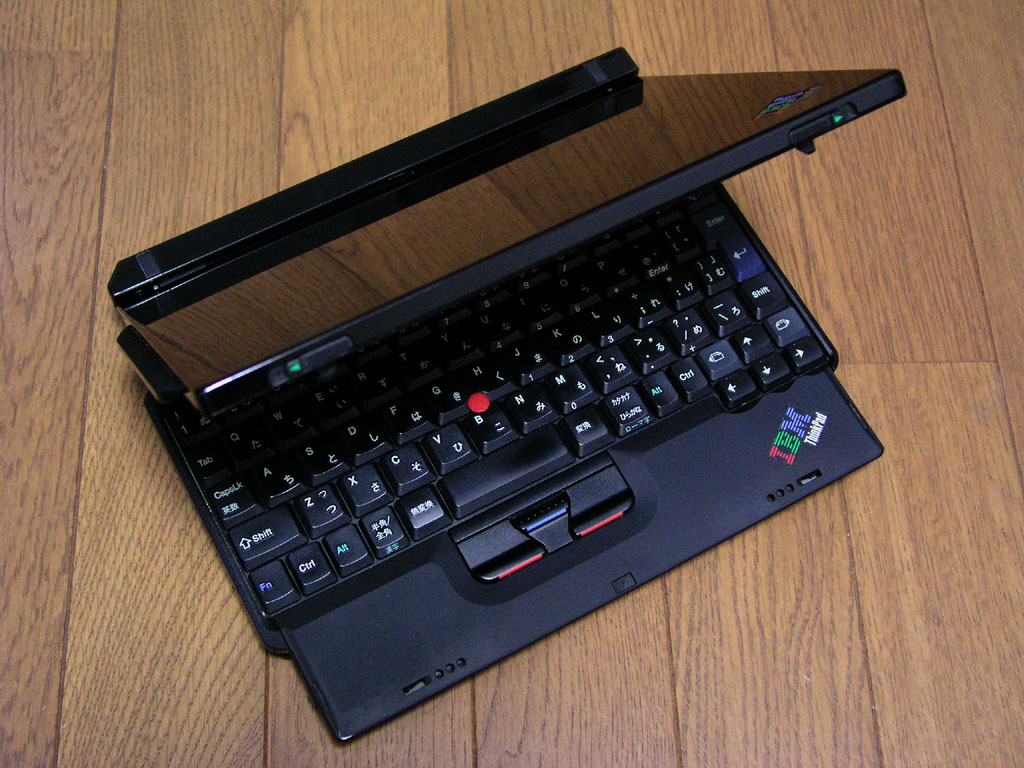
ThinkPad i Series S30 with Mirage Black lid

The i Series S30 (later rebranded to the S30) and S31 were unique ThinkPads that featured an optional piano black acryllic painted lid that IBM called "Mirage Black." The S30 was a successor to the i 1124 hence why it was originally included as part of the i Series. The S31 was sold in the Asia Pacific market with the S30 exclusive to Japan. Production ran from June 2001 to March 2002.

For a complete list of models, see the list below. Models in brackets were rebranded low-cost versions of other models. Several models were available only in specific regions.

ThinkPad i Series models
Model	CPU	RAM	Display	Disk	Sale period	Notes/ref(s).
i 1124 (240Z)	Celeron 500MHz or Pentium III 500MHz	64MB	10.4" TFT XGA	20GB	June 1999 to February 2001	
i 1157 (570E)	Celeron 500 MHz	64 / 256 MB	12.1" TFT SVGA 13.3" TFT XGA	6/12GB	June 1999 to February 2001	
i 1200	iSeries 1200-x1U Celeron 550 or 600MHz with 100MHz bus	32/64MB 192MB Max	12.1" HPA SVGA 12.1" TFT SVGA 13.3" TFT XGA	5/10GB	September 2000 to November 2001	
i 1200	iSeries 1200-x2U Celeron 600MHz with 100MHz Frontside Bus or Pentium III 700MHz with 100MHz Frontside Bus	64/192MB	12.1" TFT SVGA 13.3" TFT XGA	10/20GB	September 2000 to November 2001	
i 1200	iSeries 1200-x3U Celeron 700MHz with 100MHz Front Side Bus	64/192MB	13.3" TFT XGA	10GB	September 2000 to November 2001	
i 1210	Celeron 500 or 550MHz with 100MHz bus	32MB	12.1" HPA SVGA	6.0GB	September 2000 to November 2001	
i 1230	Celeron 500 or 550MHz with 100MHz bus	64MB	13.0" HPA SVGA	6.0GB	September 2000 to November 2001	
i 1250	Celeron 500 or 550MHz with 100MHz bus	64MB	12.1" TFT SVGA	6.0GB	September 2000 to November 2001	
i 1260	Celeron 500 or 550MHz with 100MHz bus	64MB	13.3" TFT XGA	6.0GB	September 2000 to November 2001	
i 1300 (130)	1300-x1U Celeron 550 or 600MHz with 100MHz bus or Pentium III 650MHz with 100MHz bus	64MB standard / 192MB maximum	12.1" HPA SVGA 12.1" TFT SVGA 13.1" TFT XGA	5/10/20GB	July 2000 to November 2001	
i 1330	Celeron 500 or 550MHz with 100MHz bus	64MB standard / 192MB maximum	12.1" TFT SVGA	6.0GB	July 2000 to November 2001	
i 1370	Celeron 500 or 550MHz with 100MHz bus	64MB standard / 192MB maximum	13.3" TFT XGA	12.0GB	July 2000 to November 2001	
i 1410	Pentium MMX 266MHz / 66MHz system bus	32MB / 256MB	12.1 " TFT SVGA	3.2GB	November 1998 to October 2000	
i 1411	Pentium MMX 300MHz / 66MHz system bus	32MB / 256MB	12.1" TFT SVGA	4.3GB	November 1998 to October 2000	
i 1412	Celeron 366MHz or Mobile Pentium II 366MHz / 66MHz system bus	32MB / 256MB	12.1" TFT SVGA	4.8GB	November 1998 to October 2000	
i 1420	Celeron 433 or 466MHz / 66MHz system bus	32MB / 256MB	13.0" HPA SVGA	4.8GB	November 1998 to October 2000	
i 1421	Celeron 466MHz / 66MHz system bus	32MB / 256MB	13.0" HPA SVGA	6.0GB	November 1998 to October 2000	
i 1422	Celeron 500MHz or Mobile Pentium III 500MHz / 100MHz system bus	32MB / 256MB	12.1" TFT SVGA 14.1" TFT XGA	6.0GB	November 1998 to October 2000	
i 1441	Celeron 466MHz / 66MHz system bus	64MB / 256 MB	12.0" TFT SVGA	6.0GB	November 1998 to October 2000	
i 1442	Celeron 500MHz or Mobile Pentium III 500MHz / 100MHz system bus	64MB / 256 MB	12.1" TFT SVGA 14.1" TFT XGA	6.0GB	November 1998 to October 2000	
i 1450	Pentium MMX 266MHz / 66MHz system bus	64MB / 256 MB	13.3" TFT XGA	4.3GB	November 1998 to October 2000	
i 1451	Pentium MMX 300MHz / 66MHz system bus	64MB / 256 MB	13.3" TFT XGA	4.3GB	November 1998 to October 2000	
i 1452	Celeron 366MHz or Mobile Pentium II 366MHz / 66MHz system bus	64MB / 256 MB	12.1" TFT SVGA 14.1" TFT XGA	4.8GB	November 1998 to October 2000	
i 1460	Celeron 433 or 466MHz / 66MHz system bus	64MB / 256 MB	13.0" HPA SVGA 14.1" TFT XGA	4.8GB	November 1998 to October 2000	
i 1472	Celeron 366MHz or Mobile Pentium II 366MHz / 66MHz system bus	64MB / 256 MB	14.1" TFT XGA	6.4GB	November 1998 to October 2000	
i 1480	Celeron 433 or 466MHz / 66MHz system bus	64MB / 256 MB	14.1" TFT XGA	6.4GB	November 1998 to October 2000	
i 1482	Celeron 500MHz or Mobile Pentium III 500MHz / 100MHz system bus	64MB / 256 MB	12.1" TFT SVGA 14.1" TFT XGA 13.0" HPA SVGA 15.0" TFT XGA	12.0GB	November 1998 to October 2000	
i 1483	Celeron 500MHz or Mobile Pentium III 500MHz / 100MHz system bus	64MB / 256 MB	14.1" TFT XGA 13.0" HPA SVGA 15.0" TFT XGA	12.0GB	November 1998 to October 2000	
i 1492	Celeron 500MHz or Mobile Pentium III 500MHz / 100MHz system bus	64MB / 256 MB	14.1" TFT XGA 13.0" HPA SVGA 15.0" TFT XGA	12.0GB	November 1998 to October 2000	
i 1512	Celeron 366MHz / 66MHz system bus	64MB / 256 MB	12.1" TFT SVGA	4.8GB	July 1999 to April 2002	
i 1540	Celeron 433 or 466MHz / 66MHz system bus	64MB / 256 MB	12.1" TFT SVGA	4.8GB	July 1999 to April 2002	
i 1541	Celeron 433 or 466MHz / 66MHz system bus	64MB / 256 MB	12.1" TFT SVGA	6.0GB	July 1999 to April 2002	
i 1542	Celeron 500MHz or Mobile Pentium III 500MHz / 100MHz system bus	64MB / 256 MB	12.1" TFT SVGA	12.0GB	July 1999 to April 2002	
i 1552	Celeron 366MHz / 66MHz system bus	64MB / 256 MB	14.1" TFT XGA	4.8GB	July 1999 to April 2002	
i 1560	Celeron 433 or 466MHz / 66MHz system bus	64MB / 256 MB	14.1" TFT XGA	6.4GB	July 1999 to April 2002	
i 1562	Celeron 500MHz or Mobile Pentium III 500MHz / 100MHz system bus	64MB / 256 MB	14.1" TFT XGA	12.0GB	July 1999 to April 2002	
i 1592	Celeron 500MHz or Mobile Pentium III 500MHz / 100MHz system bus	64MB / 256 MB	15.0" TFT XGA	12.0GB	July 1999 to April 2002	
i 1620 (X20)	Celeron 500 MHz or Pentium III 600 MHz	64MB / 256 MB	12.1" TFT SVGA	20.0GB	May 2001	
i 1720 (390)	Pentium II 266MHz / 66MHz system bus	64MB / 256 MB	13.3" TFT XGA	4.3GB	January 1999 to April 2002	
i 1721 (390)	Pentium II 300MHz	64MB / 256MB	14.1" TFT XGA	5.4GB	January 1999 to April 2002	
i 1780	Celeron 400 MHz or Pentium II 400 MHz or Pentium III 450 or 500 MHz	64MB / 256MB	12.1" TFT SVGA 14.1" TFT XGA 15.0" TFT XGA	4.8/6.4/12GB	January 1999 to April 2002	
i 1781	Celeron 400 MHz, Pentium II 400 MHz or Pentium III 450 or 500 MHz	64MB / 256MB	12.1" TFT SVGA 14.1" TFT XGA 15.0" TFT XGA	4.8/6.4/12GB	January 1999 to April 2002	
i 1800 (A21e) (based on A21m)	Celeron 600 Mhz or 700Mhz	64MB / 256MB	14.1" TFT XGA	10/20GB	October 2000 to July 2001	
i 1800 (A22e)	Celeron 750MHz or Pentium III Mobile 750Mhz	64MB / 256MB	14.1" TFT XGA	10/20/30GB	June 2001 to April 2002	
