= ThinkLight =

Keyboard light found on older IBM/Lenovo ThinkPads.

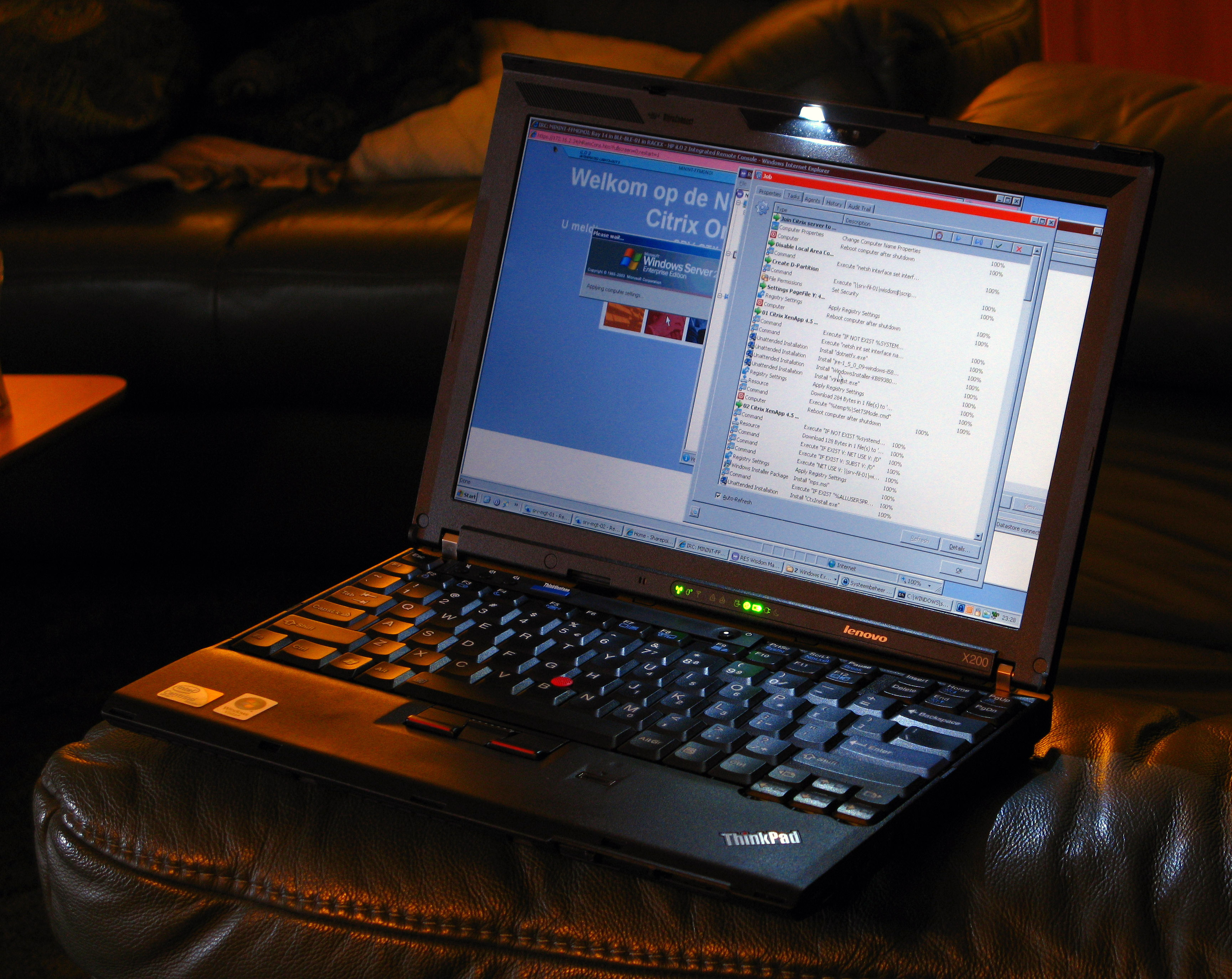
A ThinkPad X200 with ThinkLight activated

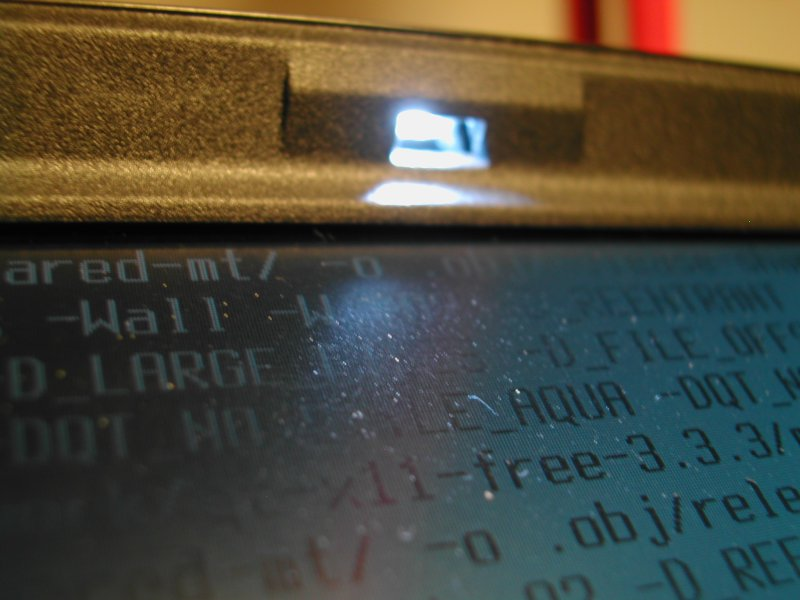
Closeup of the ThinkLight

The ThinkLight was a keyboard light present on many older ThinkPad families of notebook computers.

The series was originally designed by IBM, and then developed and produced by Lenovo since 2005. The ThinkLight has been replaced by a backlight keyboard on later generations of ThinkPads, and Lenovo discontinued the ThinkLight in 2013.

== Origins ==
The ThinkLight's origin can be traced back to the user-centric design philosophy of the original IBM ThinkPad team. Introduced on the ThinkPad i Series 1400 in 1998, it was a solution to a common user problem: needing to work in low-light conditions without the glare of a desk lamp.

IBM Designer David Hill came up with the idea while on a flight from Japan back to Raleigh and not wishing to turn on the overhead light to illuminate his keyboard. Hill handed off the idea to IBM Yamato to create a prototype which was tested and approved by Adalio Sanchez, the general manager of ThinkPad.

This single LED on the display bezel became a hallmark of the brand, much like the iconic TrackPoint, and was a signature feature on many ThinkPad families.

== Description ==
A white or amber LED (depending on model) is located on the top edge of the display, illuminating the keyboard to allow use in low-light conditions. It is activated with the key combination Fn-PgUp (the bottom left and top right keys of the keyboard). Later ThinkPads use the combination Fn-Space instead. Lenovo later started to include backlit keyboards, and some models included both the ThinkLight and a backlit keyboard. For those models, the Fn-Space shortcut is also used in conjunction to control a backlit keyboard (if the laptop has it). The on-screen display of ThinkPad computers will display a light on and a light off indicator. The ThinkLight can be activated when the monitor is on or off but not while the computer is off.

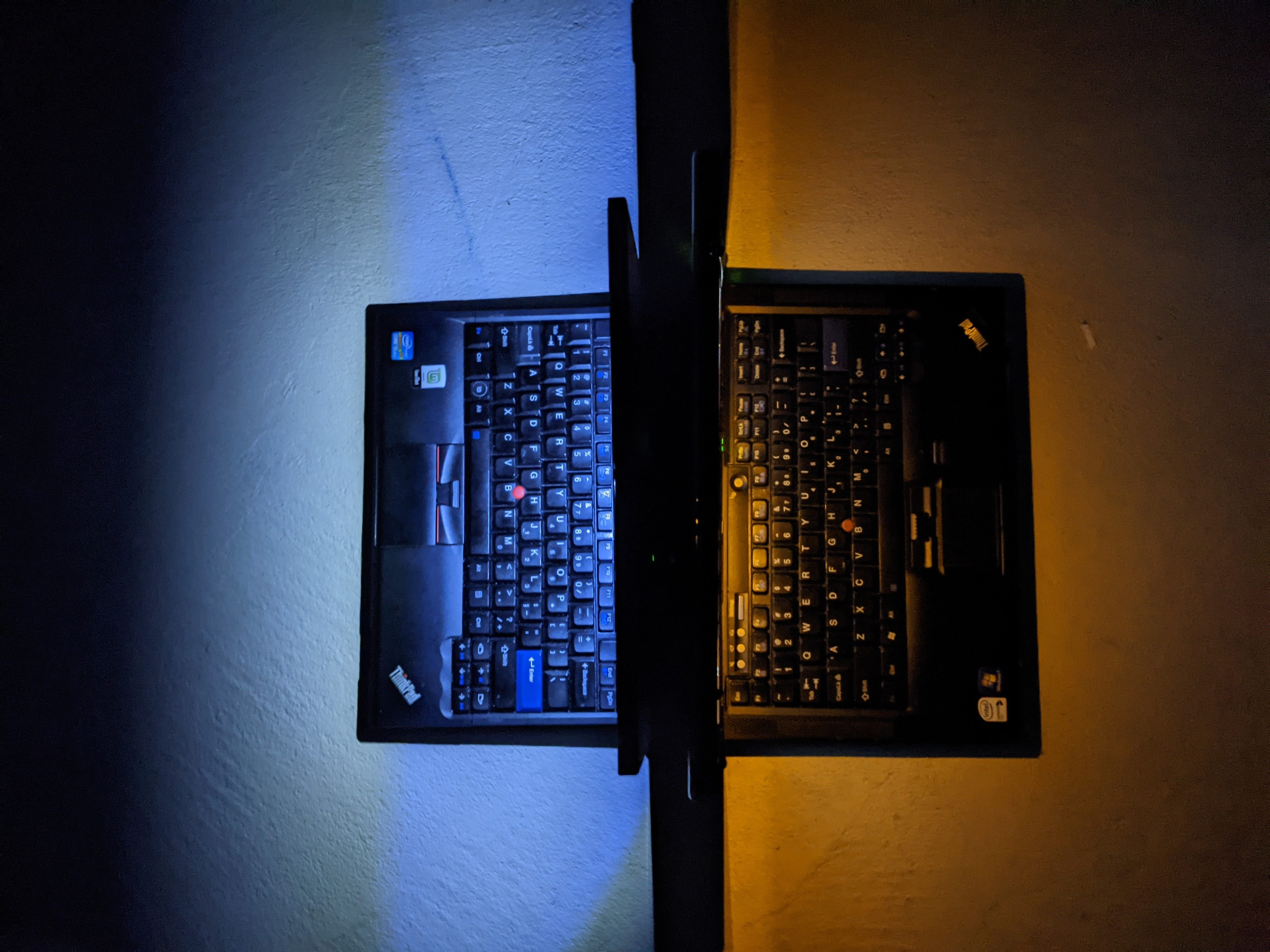
Two ThinkPads, each with a ThinkLight. The left one (ThinkPad X220) features a white LED, while the right one (ThinkPad Z61) has an amber LED.

Some ThinkPads, like the Z and R series (though not all - some R61 and R32 models still have the white light) feature an amber LED due to the lower cost, while other models, like the T series, use a white LED (which is generally preferred).

The G series and SL series omit the ThinkLight.

A few ThinkPads (17" W700 and W701) have featured the ThinkLight with dual white LEDs.

Early in the development of the ThinkPad X300, plans were made for a ultra-violet LED to be used and special ink that would allow them to glow in the dark, but this concept was removed from the final product.

When the 25th anniversary edition of ThinkPad was in its concept phase, it was equipped with two ThinkLights.

== Alternatives ==
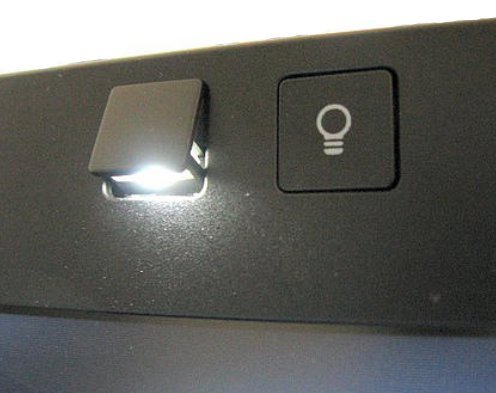
EliteBook Night Light

The HP EliteBook series notebooks contain a similar keyboard light called HP Night Light. Unlike the ThinkLight, it is activated by a physical button next to the Night Light, rather than a keyboard shortcut. Third-parties offered external LED-based illumination solutions for the HP 200LX series of palmtop computers in the late 1990s.

The Dell Latitude ATG series laptops have also contained a pair of red LEDs which are controlled in a very similar way to the IBM ThinkLight and also serve to illuminate the keyboard.

Most computer manufacturers have opted for backlit keyboards instead of illuminating the keyboard from above. During the transition period ThinkPads included both the ThinkLight and a backlit keyboard (for example, T530, T430 and X230 models). As of 2013, all ThinkPad models moving forward did not feature the ThinkLight.

== See also ==
- Selective yellow
