= ThinkPad T20 series =

Series of laptops by IBM

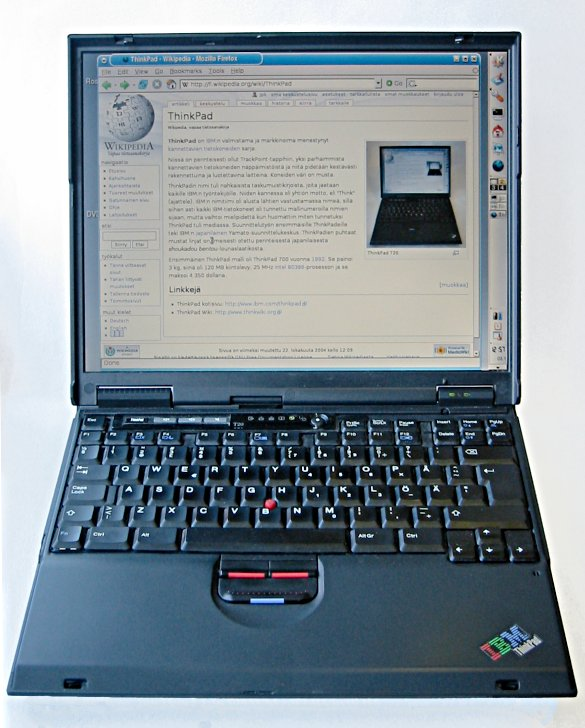
- An European-spec IBM ThinkPad T20 laptop
- Manufacturer: IBM
- Released: May 2000
- Discontinued: July 2003
- CPU: Intel Pentium III 650–1.20 GHz
- Memory: 64–256 MB SDRAM (PC100 on T20/T21/T22, PC133 on T23)
- Connectivity: Serial, Parallel, VGA out, USB, PS/2 port, Ethernet, RJ11 (Modem), IBM docking port, CardBus, S-Video Out, Line-In/Line-Out/Microphone
- Made in: Mexico: Guadalajara, Jalisco (Guadalajara Plant); United States: Research Triangle Park, North Carolina (RTP Plant; low-volume production only); Japan: Fujisawa, Kanagawa (Fujisawa Plant); United Kingdom: Greenock, Scotland (Greenock Plant); China: Shenzhen, Guangdong (IIPC)

The IBM ThinkPad T20 series was a series of notebook computers introduced in May 2000 by IBM as the successor of the 770 series and the first model of the T-series, which exists today under Lenovo ownership. Four models were produced, the T20, T21, T22, and T23; the series was succeeded in May 2002 by the ThinkPad T30, but was produced until July 2003.

== Features ==
The T20 series succeeded the 600 series, adding new features such as S-Video output, an Ethernet port, and the UltraBay 2000 hot-swappable bay. The graphics card was upgraded from the 4 MB NeoMagic 256ZX that was used in the 600X, to an 8 MB S3 Savage (16 MB on T23 models) that was capable of rendering 3D graphics in hardware. The ThinkPad T23 was also the first ThinkPad laptop model to offer an optional Wi-Fi connection via a mini-PCI card, using wireless antennas that were built into the lid on select upper-end models. The T20 series originally shipped with either Windows 98, Windows 2000, or Linux, with later T23 models shipping with Windows XP. All T20 models were capable of running Windows 3.x, Windows 95, Windows NT 4.0, OS/2 Warp 4, or Windows Me as well as various Linux distributions. Additionally, the T23 was capable of running Windows Vista or Windows 7, if equipped with at least 512 MB of memory.

One common problem affecting the earlier T20 series (T20, T21, T22) was a hardware defect with the ADP3421 power regulator chip that caused the machine to experience instability, then eventually stop working and begin blinking the hard drive and power indicators. The machine would not power on. This became known as the “Blink of Death”.

In addition, on some T23 models, the rear memory slot could fail, rendering the machine only able to use up to 512 MB of memory, rather than 1 GB. Another common issue with the T23 was that one of the coils, near the CPU, could break off the motherboard due to cold solder joints. This caused multiple issues, including the inability to boot or hard lock-up/freeze.

== Models ==
- ThinkPad T20 — First model shipped, featured a Pentium III at 650, 700 or 750 MHz, all with SpeedStep technology. This model shipped with either a 13.3" XGA TFT or 14.1" XGA TFT display, and shipped with an external floppy drive, a swappable CD-ROM or DVD-ROM drive, and a choice of a 6 GB, 12 GB, or a 20 GB hard drive. The T20 also had optional Ethernet (consumer installable via mini-PCI on all models), one USB 1.1 port, PC Card slot, and an S-Video output as standard features, and shipped with 128 MB of RAM (upgradeable to 512 MB using PC100 SO-DIMMs)
- ThinkPad T21 — Featuring an upgraded Pentium III processor at either 750 MHz, 800 MHz, or 850 MHz, the T21 featured either a 13.3" XGA TFT, 14.1" XGA TFT, or a new 14.1" SXGA+ TFT display (exclusive to 850 MHz models). This model shipped with a swappable CD-ROM or DVD-ROM drive, and a choice of a 10 GB, 20 GB or 32 GB hard drive. The T21 features either a mini-PCI modem card or an Ethernet/modem combo card, one USB 1.1 port, PC Card Slot, and 128 MB of RAM standard (upgradeable to 512 MB using PC100 SODIMMs).
- ThinkPad T22 — Featuring an upgraded Pentium III processor at either 800 MHz, 900 MHz, or 1.00 GHz, the T22 featured either a 13.3" XGA TFT, 14.1" XGA TFT, or 14.1" SXGA+ TFT display as standard. This model shipped a mini-PCI modem card or an Ethernet/modem combo card, one USB 1.1 port, PC Card Slot, a swappable CD-ROM or DVD-ROM drive, either a 10 GB, 20 GB or 32 GB hard drive, and 128 MB or 256 MB of RAM standard (upgradeable to 512 MB using PC100 SODIMMs).
- ThinkPad T23 — The final model of the T20 series, featuring the new Tualatin Pentium III-M at either 866 MHz, 1.00 GHz, 1.13 GHz, or 1.20 GHz (all with SpeedStep technology) and either a 13.3" XGA TFT, 14.1" XGA TFT, or 14.1" SXGA+ TFT display as standard. This model shipped with 2× USB 1.1 ports rather than only one, a 15 GB to 60 GB hard drive, a Mini-PCI Modem or Wireless card (on select models), a CD-ROM, DVD-ROM, CD-RW or combo (CD-RW/DVD) drive, and either 128 MB or 256 MB of RAM standard (upgradeable to 1 GB using PC133 SODIMMs). Does not suffer from the Blink of Death, unlike the other models.

=== Comparison ===
For all model versions/specifications: https://psref.lenovo.com/syspool/Sys/PDF/withdrawnbook/tawbook.pdf
Model	Intro- duction Date	With- drawal Date	Base Price	Screen Options TFT	CPU Options	Memory (std - max)	Video Controller	Audio Controller	Hard Drive Options				Misc Info	Operating System
T20	May 2000	?	?	13.3" XGA 1024×768; 14.1" XGA 1024×768	Intel Pentium III - 650, 700, or 750 MHz with SpeedStep Technology, 100 MHz Bus; 256 KB cache	128 - 512 MB @ 100 MHz; SDRAM	Via; S3 Savage IX8; 8 MB SGRAM; AGP 2x	Cirrus; CS4264; CS4297A	6 GB	12 GB	18 GB	20 GB	Ultrabay 2000; ThinkLight; UltraPort; 56K Modem; Li-Ion Battery (4 hr)	Windows 98SE Windows 2000 Caldera OpenLinux eDesktop 2.4
T21	Oct 2000	?	?	13.3" XGA 1024×768; 14.1" XGA 1024×768; 14.1" SXGA+ 1400×1050	Intel Pentium III - 750, 800, or 850 MHz with SpeedStep Technology, 100 MHz Bus; 256 KB cache	128 - 512 MB @ 100 MHz; SDRAM	Via; S3 Savage IX8 or IX8+ 8 MB SGRAM; AGP 2x	Cirrus; CS4264; CS4297A	10 GB	20 GB		32 GB	Ultrabay 2000; ThinkLight; UltraPort; 56K Modem; Li-Ion Battery (4 hr)	Windows 98SE Windows 2000 Caldera OpenLinux eDesktop 2.4
T22	Mar 2001	?	?	13.3" XGA 1024×768; 14.1" XGA 1024×768; 14.1" SXGA+ 1400×1050	Intel Pentium III - 800 or 900 MHz, or 1 GHz with SpeedStep Technology; 100 MHz Bus; 256 KB cache	128 - 512 MB @ 100 MHz; SDRAM	Via; S3 Savage IX8+ 8 MB SGRAM; AGP 2x	Cirrus; CS4264; CS4297A	15 GB	30 GB		32 GB	Ultrabay 2000; ThinkLight; UltraPort; 56K Modem; Li-Ion Battery (4 hr)	Windows 98SE Windows 2000 Caldera OpenLinux eDesktop 2.4
T22 (SB)	Mar 2001	?	?	14.1" XGA 1024×768; 14.1" SXGA+ 1400×1050	Intel Pentium III - 900 MHz or 1 GHz with SpeedStep Technology, 100 MHz Bus; 256 KB cache	128 - 512 MB @ 100 MHz; SDRAM	Via; S3 Savage IX8+ 8 MB SGRAM; AGP 2x	Cirrus; CS4264; CS4297A	15 GB	30 GB	32 GB	48 GB	Ultrabay 2000; ThinkLight; UltraPort; 56K Modem; Li-Ion Battery (4 hr)	Windows 98SE Windows 2000
T23	Jul 2001	?	?	13.3" XGA 1024×768; 14.1" XGA 1024×768; 14.1" SXGA+ 1400×1050	Intel Pentium III - 866 MHz or 1.13 GHz with SpeedStep Technology, 133 MHz Bus; 512 KB cache	128 MB - 1 GB @ 133 MHz; SDRAM	Via; S3 Super Savage IXC16; 16 MB SGRAM; AGP 4x	Cirrus; CS4299	15 GB	30 GB		48 GB	Ultrabay 2000; ThinkLight; UltraPort; 56K Modem; 802.11b Modem; Li-Ion Battery	Windows 98SE Windows 2000
T23 (Fall)	Oct 2001	?	?	14.1" XGA 1024×768; 14.1" SXGA+ 1400×1050	Intel Pentium III - 1.0, 1.13 or 1.2 GHz with SpeedStep Technology, 133 MHz Bus; 512 KB cache	128 MB - 1 GB @ 133 MHz; SDRAM	Via; S3 Super Savage IXC16; 16 MB SGRAM; AGP 4x	Cirrus; CS4299	30 GB	40 GB		48 GB	Ultrabay Plus; ThinkLight; UltraPort; 56K Modem; WLAN; Li-Ion Battery	Windows 2000 Windows XP Professional
T23 (Ed)	Apr 2002	?	?	14.1" XGA 1024×768	Intel Pentium III - 1.0 GHz with SpeedStep Technology; 133 MHz Bus; 512 KB cache	256 MB - 1 GB @ 133 MHz; SDRAM	Via; S3 Super Savage IXC16; 16 MB SGRAM; AGP 4x	Cirrus; CS4299	20 GB	40 GB		80 GB	Ultrabay Plus; ThinkLight; UltraPort; WLAN; Li-Ion Battery	Windows XP Professional
T23 (02)	Jun 2002	?	?	14.1" XGA 1024×768	Intel Pentium III - 1.0, 1.13 or 1.2 GHz with SpeedStep Technology; 133 MHz Bus; 512 KB cache	256 MB - 1 GB @ 133 MHz; SDRAM	Via; S3 Super Savage IXC16; 16 MB SGRAM; AGP 4x	Cirrus; CS4299	20 GB	30 GB	40 GB	80 GB	Ultrabay Plus; ThinkLight; 56K Modem; WLAN; Li-Ion Battery	Windows 2000 Windows XP Professional

== See also ==
- ThinkPad T Series

ThinkPad T series
Preceded by IBM ThinkPad 770	IBM ThinkPad T20 series May 2000-July 2003	Succeeded by IBM ThinkPad T30
