= ThinkPad 760 =

Computer model by IBM

Thinkpad 760-series

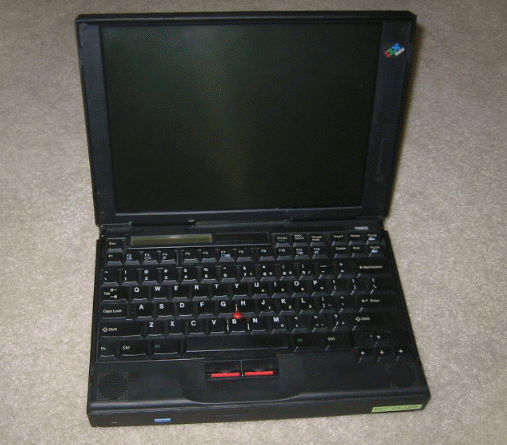
- IBM ThinkPad 760ED
- Manufacturer: IBM
- Released: 1995
- Discontinued: 1998
- CPU: Intel Pentium I, 90 MHz – 166 MHz
- Memory: 8–64 MB EDO RAM
- Connectivity: Serial, Parallel, VGA out, IBM docking port, IBM external floppy drive port, CardBus (Windows 9x only), Video In, Video Out, MPEG-2 decoder (some models)
- Made in: United States, Japan, Scotland, Mexico
- Website: pc.ibm.com at the Wayback Machine (archived 1996-11-21)

IBM ThinkPad 760 was a notebook computer introduced in 1995 by the IBM corporation into the market as part of the ThinkPad 700-series. It was succeeded in 1998 by the ThinkPad 770 series.

== Features ==
The 760-series of the IBM ThinkPad was available at the time of its production as the most state of the art notebook available to the public by IBM. It used the Intel Pentium processor, and utilized EDO RAM soldered onto the motherboard to prevent booting without usable RAM, and the ability to easily exchange critical hardware components, such as the Hard Drive, Battery, Option hardware that can fit in the UltraBay, and the RAM. This model also featured the unique keyboard that could slide upward on the back side on rails to "flip up" towards the user and provide a more ergonomic feel.

The 760C and L models did not provide space for an optical drive and were a thinner form factor similar in size and shape to the outgoing 755 series. This is despite the fact the 755 range accommodated its own optical drive.

The later 765 models were another form factor again, having a larger footprint more akin to the 770-series.

== Models ==
Note – the "D" in the model number signifies the machine had the updated chassis with provision for fitment of a CD-ROM drive, or when using an adapter plate, an internal floppy disk drive. The models without the "D" didn't officially come with the updated chassis.

- IBM ThinkPad 760C – Was the first model shipped, with the original 90/120 MHz Pentium processor. This shipped with a Floppy Drive, 810 MB hard disk drive, and Windows 3.1 preinstalled. It had 8 MB RAM (which was soldered onto the motherboard), with an option of upgrading. There was also the option of having a modem built in for internet connection, and a choice of 10.4" or 12.1" TFT displays, both with a maximum resolution of 800x600.
- IBM ThinkPad 760CD – Produced as a small improvement over the original 760C, again with the improved 90/120 MHz Pentium processor and option of RAM expansion. The chassis was updated to allow the standard fitment of in internal CD-ROM drive.
- IBM ThinkPad 760L – With the original 90/120 MHz Pentium processor. This shipped with a floppy drive, 810 MB hard drive, and Windows 3.1 preinstalled. It had 8 MB RAM (which was soldered onto the motherboard), with an option of upgrading. There was also the option of 10.4" or 12.1" TFT displays, both with a maximum resolution of 800x600. These are effectively a 760C machine, but without the improved sound card/DSP.

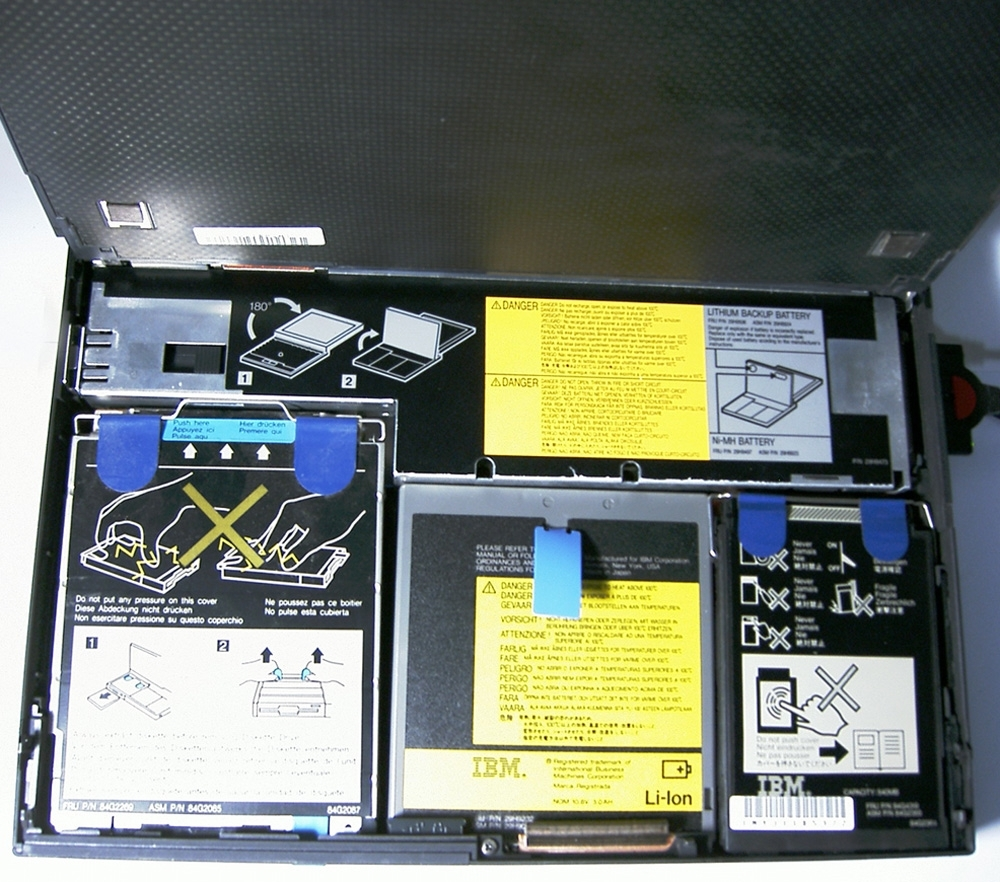
760LD internals

- IBM ThinkPad 760LD – Produced as a small improvement over the original 760L, again with the improved 90/120 MHz Pentium processor and option of RAM expansion. The chassis was updated to allow the standard fitment of in internal CD-ROM drive.
- IBM ThinkPad 760E – This was the much improved model to be released, with the RAM expansion module standard and the better-performing 120/133/150 MHz Pentium. This was shipped with a Floppy Drive and allowed for up to a 2.1 GB hard drive option. This model also included Windows 95 as an option. This model also came with a RAM expansion module which had an additional 8 MB RAM to total 16 MB of usable RAM, and had 2 slots on it to allow up to 80 MB RAM to be installed (2x32 MB RAM modules in addition to the standard 8/16 MB). This option will be in all later 760 models. This model also introduced the option of a CD-ROM drive, these laptops can be distinguished with a modified front. It also had the option of an enhanced 12.1" TFT display with a maximum resolution of 1024x768.
- IBM ThinkPad 760ED – This featured the CD-ROM edition of Windows 95 preinstalled which included Internet Explorer 2.0. This also featured software options and improved services over that of the 760E, including an enhanced video card with MPEG2 hardware decoding and a DSP card with built-in modem/fax functionality.
- IBM ThinkPad 760EL – Was made alongside the 760ED, but standard configurations were of lower specification. 100/120/133 MHz processors, and the option of 12.1" 800x600 TFT or 11.3" 800x600 DSTN displays, with 810 MB – 1.2 GB hard drives.
- IBM ThinkPad 760ELD – Every one of these made featured the modified front to fit the CD-ROM, but still offered a Floppy Drive option which would include a specially built bezel that fits in the front to help the floppy drive fit correctly. These featured all the options and services the 760EL offered.
- IBM ThinkPad 760XL – Basically an SVGA+ screen version of the 760XD and without the DSP. Released 1997. Maximum RAM of 104MB.
- IBM ThinkPad 760XD – This model, released in 1997, offered an XGA screen and received the more recently developed 166 MHz Intel Pentium MMX proccesor. A far improved model version of the 760. This model featured 48 MB RAM standard and a CD-ROM standard. Offered a 2.1 GB and 3.0 GB hard drive option and came pre-installed with Windows 95. The 760XD is also used on the International Space Station.
- IBM ThinkPad 765D/L – This was the last of the 760 series made, featuring a 13.3" XGA screen, Pentium MMX processor rated at 166 MHz, and a maximum of 104 MB of RAM.

=== Models ===
IBM ThinkPad 760 series models
Model	Introduction	Withdrawal	Display	Resolution	CPU	Memory (std - max)	Video	Audio	Hard Drive
760L	Feb 1996	Oct 1996	10.4" Color TFT	640x480	90 MHz Pentium	8 - 64 MB	Trident Cyber9320	ESS 1688	810 MB
760LD	Feb 1996	Oct 1996	10.4" Color TFT	640x480	90/120 MHz Pentium	8 - 64 MB	Trident Cyber9320	ESS 1688	810 MB
760C	Oct 1995	Oct 1996	10.4" 12.1" Color TFT	640x480 800x600	90/120 MHz Pentium	8 - 64 MB	Trident Cyber9320	Mwave MDSP2780	720 MB or 1.08 GB
760CD	Oct 1995	Oct 1996	12.1" Color TFT	640x480 800x600	90/120 MHz Pentium	8 - 64 MB	Trident Cyber9320	Mwave MDSP2780	1.2 GB
760EL	May 1996	?	12.1" Color TFT or 11.3" Color DSTN	640x480 800x600	100/120/133 MHz Pentium	8 - 104 MB	Trident Cyber9320	ESS 1688	810 MB or 1.08 GB
760EL (Fall 96)	Oct 1996	Jul 1997	12.1" Color TFT or 11.3" Color DSTN	640x480 800x600	120/133 MHz Pentium	8 - 104 MB	Trident Cyber9320 (DSTN) Trident Cyber9385 (TFT)	ESS 1688	1.35GB or 2.1GB
760ELD	May 1996	May 1997	12.1" Color TFT	640x480 800x600	100/133 MHz Pentium	8 - 72 MB	Trident Cyber9320	ESS 1688	810 MB
760E (SVGA)	May 1996	Jan 1997	12.1" Color TFT	640x480 800x600	120/133 MHz Pentium	8 - 104 MB	Trident Cyber9320	Mwave MDSP2780	810MB or 1.08 GB or 1.2 GB
760E (XGA)	Oct 1996	Oct 1997	12.1" Color TFT	640x480 800x600 1024x768	150 MHz Pentium	16 - 80 MB	Trident Cyber9385	Mwave MDSP2780	2.1 GB
760ED (SVGA)	May 1996	Jan 1997	12.1" Color TFT	640x480 800x600	133 MHz Pentium	16 - 80 MB	Trident Cyber9385	Mwave MDSP2780	1.2GB
760ED (XGA)	Oct 1996	Oct 1997	12.1" Color TFT	640x480 800x600 1024x768	133 MHz Pentium	16 - 80 MB	Trident Cyber9385	Mwave MDSP2780	2.1 GB
760XL	Apr 1997	Jan 1998	12.1" Color TFT	640x480 800x600	166 MHz Pentium	16 - 104 MB	Trident Cyber9385	ESS 1688	2.1 GB
760XD	Apr 1997	Jan 1998	12.1" Color TFT	640x480 800x600 1024x768	166 MHz Pentium	32 - 104 MB	Trident Cyber9385	Mwave MDSP2780	3.0GB
765L	Jun 1997	Jul 1998	13.3" Color TFT	640x480 800x600 1024x768	166 MHz Pentium	32 - 104 MB	Trident Cyber9385	ESS 1688	3.0GB
765D	Jun 1997	Jul 1997	13.3" Color TFT	640x480 800x600 1024x768	166 MHz Pentium	32 - 104 MB	Trident Cyber9385	MwaveMDSP2780	3.0GB
