= ThinkPad 755 =

Series of laptops by IBM

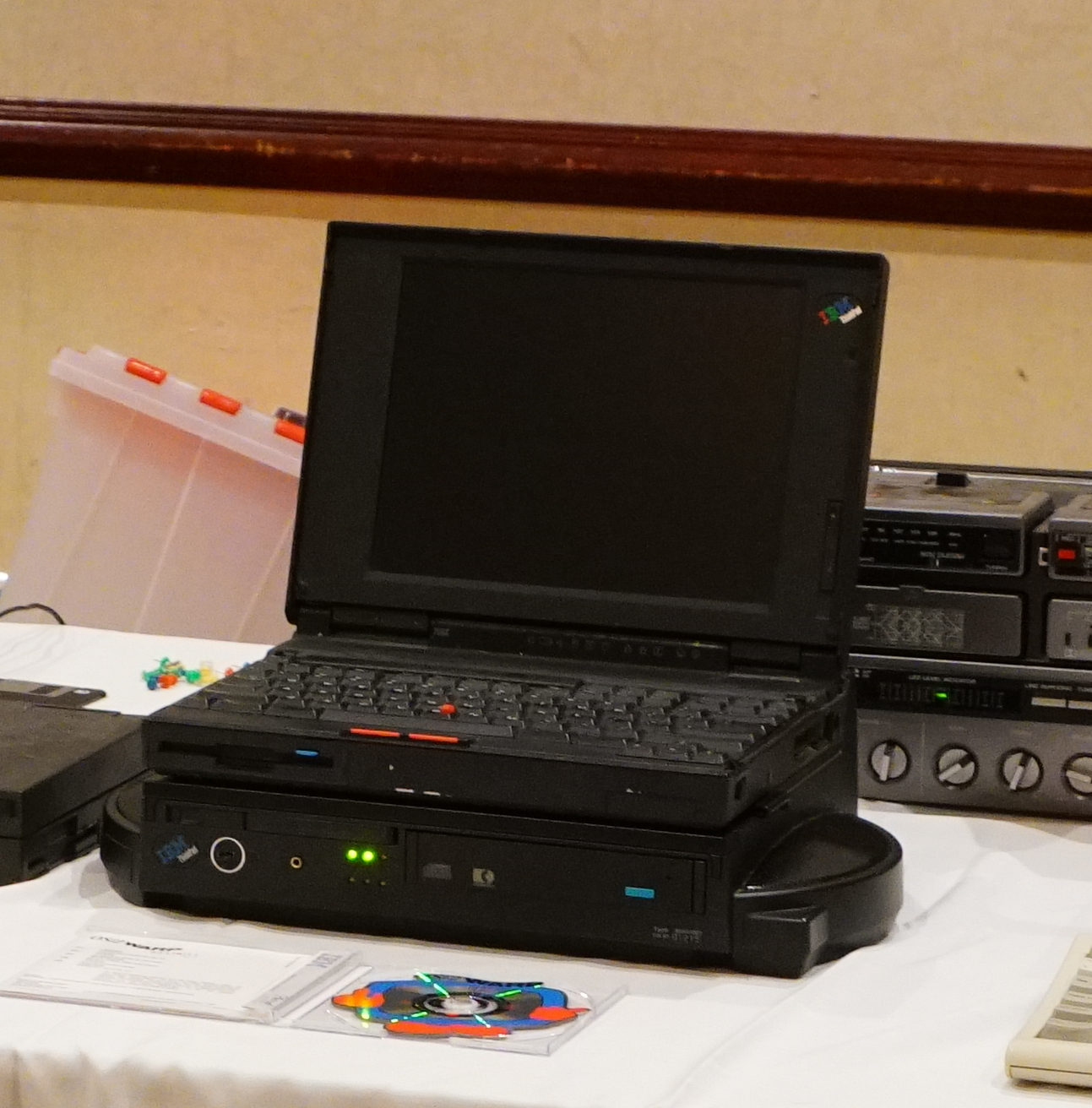
- ThinkPad 755C (1994), plugged into its official docking station
- Developer: International Business Machines Corporation (IBM)
- Manufacturer: IBM
- Type: Laptop (notebook)
- Released: May 17, 1994; 32 years ago
- Lifespan: 1994–1996
- Discontinued: 1996; 30 years ago
- CPU: i486DX2 at 50 MHz; i486DX4 at 75 or 100 MHz; Pentium at 100 MHz
- Memory: 4–40 MB RAM
- Made in: United States: Research Triangle Park, North Carolina (RTP Plant); Japan: Fujisawa, Kanagawa (Fujisawa Plant); United Kingdom: Greenock, Scotland (Greenock Plant); Mexico: Guadalajara, Jalisco (Guadalajara Plant)
- Website: Archived on 1996-11-21 at the Wayback Machine: 755CE/CSE/C/CS; 755CDV/CV/CD; 755CX

The ThinkPad 755 is a series of high-end notebook-sized laptops released by IBM from 1994 to 1996. All models in the line feature either the i486 processor or the original Pentium processor by Intel, clocked between 50 and 100 MHz. The ThinkPad 755CD, introduced in October 1994, was the first notebook on the market with an internal full-sized CD-ROM drive. The ThinkPad 755 series was the top-selling laptop for much of 1994, beating out competition from Apple Computer and Compaq. IBM replaced it with the ThinkPad 760 series in January 1996.

== Development and specifications ==
=== ThinkPad 755C and 755Cs ===
IBM announced the ThinkPad 755 series in April 1994 and released it the following month on May 17. It replaced the previous ThinkPad 750 line as IBM's high-end offering in their ThinkPad family of notebook computers. The first two models in the line comprise the ThinkPad 755C and the ThinkPad 755Cs. As stock, the 755C and the 755Cs feature the i486 processor in its clock-doubled DX2 variant, with a clock speed of 50 MHz. Users could optionally upgrade the DX2 to the clock-tripled 75-MHz DX4. The 755C features a 10.4-inch, color, active-matrix TFT liquid-crystal display (LCD); while the 755Cs features a 9.5-inch, color, passive-matrix STN LCD. IBM offered the laptops with either a 340-MB or a 540-MB hard disk drive (HDD) and a 3.5-inch, 2.88-MB floppy disk drive.

The 755C and Cs models were internally strongly associated with the Thinkpad 750, sharing many of the internal components and therefore can be swapped between machines.

=== ThinkPad 755CE, 755CSE, 755CD ===
IBM followed up the original two models of the ThinkPad 755 with the ThinkPad 755CE, ThinkPad 755CSE, and the ThinkPad 755CD in October 1994. All three models of ThinkPad feature, as stock, the i486DX4 clocked at 100 MHz. On these three models, the i486DX4 is contained on a daughterboard that connects to a socket on the motherboard, allowing the laptop to receive aftermarket processor upgrades (see below).

The 755CD was the first notebook computer on the market with an internal, full-sized (120 mm diameter) CD-ROM drive. (Note: Panasonic had in 1993 released the CF-V21P, the first notebook with an internal CD-ROM drive. However, its CD-ROM drive could only take mini CDs 90 mm in diameter, which was a very uncommon format for software distribution.) The CD-ROM drive was a double-speed, tray-loading model that plugged into the UltraBay underneath the keyboard. In order to accommodate the CD-ROM drive, IBM designed the 755CD to be 7.2 mm thicker than other models in the ThinkPad 755 range (including the 755CE and the 755CSE), for a total thickness of 57 millimetres (2.2 in). Customers could have purchased the internal CD-ROM separately and plugged it into an external UltraBay drive enclosure that plugged into a special plug on the side of the 755CE and the 755CSE; however, because of their thinner stature, they cannot house the CD-ROM internally.

The 755CE, the 755CSE, and the 755CD also replaced the sound chip by Crystal Semiconductor of prior 755 models with the Mwave, a digital signal processor designed in-house at IBM that doubled as a 14.4-Kbps data/fax modem, a speakerphone, and an answering machine. Additionally, the built-in TrackPoint pointing device of prior ThinkPads was improved to sport a rougher, grippier texture of the pointing stick, preventing the finger from easily slipping off during use, while the left- and right-click button switches were made heavier to prevent accidental actuation. The 755CE and the 755CD feature a 10.4-inch active-matrix TFT LCD with a special polarizer, dubbed "Black Matrix", which enhanced the picture's dynamic range. The 755CSE, on the other hand, shipped with a 10.4-inch passive matrix STN LCD. All three models of ThinkPad were optioned with either 340-MB, 540-MB, or 810-MB HDDs.

In September 1995, IBM began selling the 755CE, the 755CSE, and the 755CD with an optional processor daughtercard containing a Pentium processor clocked at 75 MHz. While its clock speed was technically slower than the i486DX4, the Pentium was quicker and more efficient.

The 755CE and all subsequent models were architecturally very different from the 755C and Cs models. Very little can be shared or swapped between models.

=== ThinkPad 755CDV, 755CV, 755CX ===
In June 1995, IBM refreshed the 755 line with three new models: the 755CDV, the 755CV, and the 755CX. The 755CDV and the 755CV feature 100-MHz i486DX4 processors, while the 755CX features the original Pentium processor clocked at 75 MHz. The 755CX was IBM's first laptop based on the Pentium processor.

The 755CDV and the 755CV meanwhile were designed with a specialized top housing that put the backlight of the 10.4-inch active-matrix TFT LCDs on a detachable tray, the removal of which makes the LCD transparent. Additionally, the laptop is able to be pivoted 180 degrees flat. These two design elements were intended for using the laptop on a commodity overhead projector to display its graphical output. This was an inexpensive and less cumbersome alternative to owning dedicated digital projectors that could take VGA input, a class of projector which did not go down appreciably in price and weight until years later. The convertible approach of the 755CV and 755CDV was not new to notebook computers: Revered Technology Inc. (RTI) had a similarly designed notebook, the Power Cruiser, on the market in 1994. Other companies had also been selling standalone transparent LCD panels for placing onto overhead projectors that could take input from a computer for some years.

The 755CDV came with the internal UltraBay CD-ROM of the 755CD preinstalled, while the 755CV and the 755CX lacked this option. However, all three models of ThinkPad were designed with the Mwave DSP on-board, like the 755CD. Around August 1995, IBM upgraded the 640-by-480-pixel VGA display of the 755CX to Super VGA, at 800 by 600 pixels. In September 1995, IBM began selling the 755CDV and the 755CV with the 75-MHz Pentium processor daughtercard as an option.

The 755CX is unique in how similar it is architecturally to the 760 successor machine.

== Models ==
IBM ThinkPad 755 series models
Model	Release date	Processor	Clock speed (MHz)	LCD technology	LCD size (in.)	LCD resolution	Stock RAM (max., in MB)	HDD (MB)	Graphics chip	Audio chip	Stock UltraBay option	Notes/ref(s).
755C	May 1994	i486DX2 or i486DX4	50 (DX2); 75 (DX4)	Color TFT	10.4	640×480	4 (36)	340 or 540	Western Digital WD90C24A (1 MiB VRAM)	Crystal CS4248	3.5-inch floppy drive	
755Cs	May 1994	i486DX2	50 (DX2); 75 (DX4)	Color STN	10.4	640×480	4 (36)	340 or 540	Western Digital WD90C24A (1 MiB VRAM)	Crystal CS4248	3.5-inch floppy drive	
755CE	October 1994	i486DX4	100	Color TFT ("Black Matrix")	10.4	640×480	8 (40)	340 or 540 or 810	Western Digital WD90C24A (1 MiB VRAM)	IBM Mwave	3.5-inch floppy drive	
755CSE	October 1994	i486DX4	100	Color STN	10.4	640×480	8 (40)	340 or 540 or 810	Western Digital WD90C24A (1 MiB VRAM)	IBM Mwave	3.5-inch floppy drive	
755CD	October 1994	i486DX4 or Pentium	100 (DX4); 75 (Pentium)	Color TFT ("Black Matrix")	10.4	640×480	8 (40)	340 or 540 or 810	Western Digital WD90C24A (1 MiB VRAM)	IBM Mwave	CD-ROM drive	
755CDV	June 1995	i486DX4 or Pentium	100 (DX4); 75 (Pentium)	Color TFT (removable back panel)	10.4	640×480	8 (40)	540	Western Digital WD90C24A (1 MiB VRAM)	IBM Mwave	CD-ROM drive	
755CV	June 1995	i486DX4 or Pentium	100 (DX4); 75 (Pentium)	Color TFT (removable back panel)	10.4	640×480	8 (40)	540	Western Digital WD90C24A (1 MiB VRAM)	IBM Mwave	3.5-inch floppy drive	
755CX	June 1995	Pentium	75	Color TFT	10.4	640×480 or 800×600	8 (40)	540 or 810	Western Digital WD90C24A (1 MiB VRAM)	IBM Mwave	3.5-inch floppy drive	
