= ThinkPad T30 =

Laptop computer

IBM ThinkPad T30

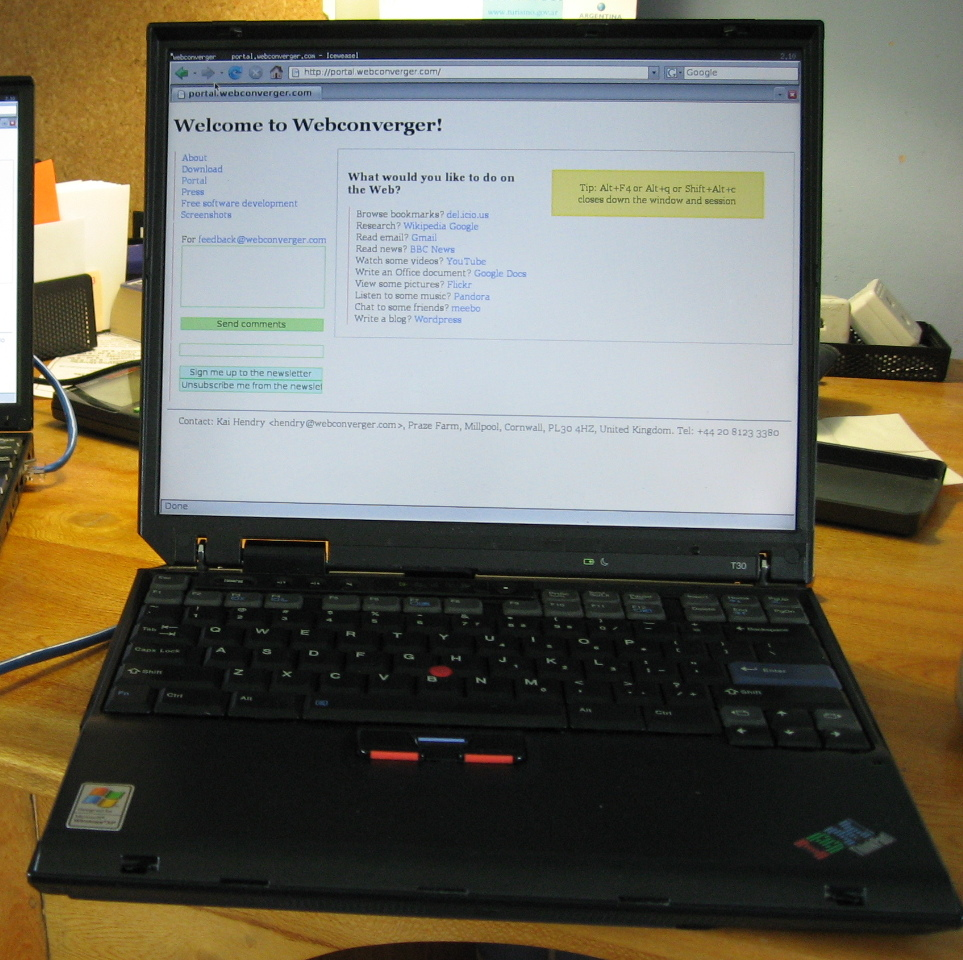
- An US-spec IBM ThinkPad T30 laptop
- Manufacturer: IBM
- Released: May 8, 2002
- Discontinued: January 2004
- CPU: Intel Pentium 4-M 1.6–2.0 GHz
- Memory: 256–512 MB SDRAM (PC2100), expandable up to 2GB
- Connectivity: 2x USB, serial, parallel, S-video out, infrared, VGA, Ethernet, modem, audio and microphone jacks
- Made in: Mexico: Guadalajara, Jalisco (Guadalajara Plant); United States: Research Triangle Park, North Carolina (RTP Plant; low-volume production only); Japan: Fujisawa, Kanagawa (Fujisawa Plant); United Kingdom: Greenock, Scotland (Greenock Plant); China: Shenzhen, Guangdong (IIPC)

The IBM ThinkPad T30 is a laptop computer manufactured by IBM.

== History ==
The ThinkPad T30 was announced by IBM on April 24, 2002, and was released in the United States on May 8, 2002 with a base price starting at approximately US$2,500. It was discontinued in January 2004.

== Hardware ==
The ThinkPad T30 came equipped with a Pentium 4-M CPU using the Intel 845MP chipset. Stock processors ranged from 1.6 GHz to 2.0 GHz, with later BIOS and embedded controller upgrades adding support for processors up to 2.4 GHz. 256 MB of PC2100 memory was included by default, with support for up to 1 GB in a 2x512 MB configuration. As higher capacity PC2100 modules became available, up to 2 GB of installed memory could be used.

This model was the last IBM ThinkPad with a battery placed on the bottom of the chassis, the first 14.1-inch ThinkPad with a 1400 × 1050 screen option, and the first T-series ThinkPad with an optional touchpad.

Graphics were provided by an ATI Mobility Radeon 7500 video controller with 16 MB of graphics memory. External video output was officially limited to 1280 × 1024 due to a weak TMDS transmitter, although when docked, 1920 × 1200 was achievable using a DVI connection. Available features included the embedded security subsystem, a 20, 40, or 60 GB hard disk drive, and an Ultrabay Plus slot for removable media drives (DVD/CD-RW) or an additional battery. Wi-Fi and Bluetooth connectivity was optionally provided with a Mini PCI card.

The T30 is suffers from a well-known issue where the solder joints for the RAM slots crack due to their location unsupported on the bottom of the laptop. This eventually renders one and then both slots unusable, causing the computer to no longer boot. This issue can generally be remedied with a reflow of the RAM slot's solder joints, or temporarily by pushing on the RAM slot to reconnect the cracked joints. This issue also effects the earlier T20 series, but is less common. IBM ran an out-of-warranty repair service for this until mid-2005.

== Reception ==
The notebook was favorably received by TechRepublic; and the ZDnet praises the good performance and relatively compact case for a NetBurst-based laptop. PC Magazine editor Bill Howard rated the laptop with 3 out of 5 stars.

== See also ==
- ThinkPad A30 series - 15" contemporary models
- ThinkPad R30 series - 14" low-cost contemporary model

ThinkPad T series
Preceded by IBM ThinkPad T20 series	IBM ThinkPad T30; 2002- 2004	Succeeded by IBM ThinkPad T40 series
