= Digital Ocean =

Former wireless product company

Digital Ocean, Inc.
- Type: Private
- Industry: Computers
- Founded: 1992; 34 years ago in Lenexa, Kansas
- Founder: Jeffery Alholm
- Defunct: 1998; 28 years ago
- Fate: Acquired by Harris Semiconductor
- Headquarters: New York City
- Website: was digitalocean.com, which is now used by cloud infrastructure provider DigitalOcean

Digital Ocean, Inc. was a maker of wireless products from 1992 until it was disbanded in 1998.

== History ==
The company was founded in May 1992 by Jeffery Alholm and headquartered in Lenexa, Kansas. The company had several contracts with Apple, AT&T, Aironet Wireless Communications (later acquired by Cisco as its wireless LAN division), Harris Semiconductor, the United States Department of Defense. It was a co-developer of the IEEE 802.11 wireless standard and of the industry's first 802.11 chipset. It developed the Seahorse, arguably the world's first smartphone. In addition, by specializing in rapid, custom development, the company concluded multiple individual development contracts for application-specific wireless products in vertical markets. Digital Ocean was granted approximately 20 patents for its development of wireless technologies.

In 1998 it was sold with its assets to Harris Semiconductor to become part of their Intersil division; Intersil was then spun off from Harris one year later.

== Products ==
Several products included:

=== Starfish ===
The Starfish product lines include the Starfish Wireless Access Point for LocalTalk and EtherTalk Macintosh, the Starfish with Microcellular Roaming Software which enables seamless roaming, and the Starfish II Ethernet Access Point which Business Wire Magazine explained, "The Starfish II connects to wired networks and acts as the access provider for Manta and Digital Ocean's other station products."

=== Manta ===
The Manta product lines include the Manta 500EN EtherTalk Wireless Station with AAUI Connection, and the Manta 10BaseT which allows Wireless network connections at full Ethernet speeds.

=== Grouper Line ===
The Grouper line of products were networking devices that used spread-spectrum radio waves to communicate. Groupers could be attached to any PowerBook or used freestanding with any desktop Mac. Placing one Grouper on a wired network would have it serve as a hub for up to 15 other wireless Groupers. Keeping with Digital Ocean's theme, the collection of networked computers was called a school. Wireless devices could access the Grouper-enabled network from within a 250-foot distance indoors to an 800-foot distance outdoors, and the Grouper only used one-sixtieth the power of other comparable wireless devices.

=== Macintosh ===
The Macintosh products include; 200LTS Wireless LocalTalk Station for Macintosh

100MPS which allows for a wireless local area connectivity for all Newton MessagePads.

==== 100MPS+ ====
Wireless local area connectivity for all Newton MessagePads; included additional port for serial devices, such as wand barcode readers, laser barcode scanners, and printers.

==== 105MPS ====
Package included Grouper 100MPS+ with Digital Ocean Pen Reader, bundled with AllPen barcode software for wireless data collection.

==== 100LTS LocalTalk for Macintosh ====
The original Wireless LocalTalk station for Macintosh that mounted directly to the bottom of 100xx PowerBooks.

==== Tarpon All-In-One PDA ====
The Tarpon integrated an Apple Newton and Digital Ocean Grouper with backlighting, a water-resistant and ruggedized case, and built-in wireless LAN, WAN, modem, voice capability for anything from simple peer-to-peer conversations to full telephony, and optional GPS via the PCMCIA slot. The addition of wireless capabilities to Newton-based devices was called "a major step forward" because "without it, they are not really useful." The Tarpon began as the SuperTech 2000, but was then further modified and released to the general public under the new name.

=== Seahorse ===
A rugged handheld computer based on the Newton OS 2.0, the Seahorse was backlit, lightweight, and durable, with a variety of integrated communication capabilities: the first CDPD modem ever in a wireless PDA, PCMCIA slot, WLAN modem, and a modular snap-on nose for optional GPS and diffused infrared capabilities. A rugged boot protected Seahorse, while large-capacity, slide-in rechargeable batteries provided around eight hours of continuous use. Together these features made Seahorse a solution for: remote handheld access to customer service databases, wireless Internet access, precision location applications utilizing handheld GPS systems, and wirelessly accessing corporate and Internet databases to utilize schematics and manuals while in the field.

Digital Ocean began sales of the Seahorse in 1996. Though not its original intention, the Seahorse arguably contained all the intellectual property and engineering in one integrated device to constitute the world's first smartphone, as defined by four parameters:

1. a PDA
2. with an integrated data/voice phone
3. which can access the Internet via a graphical browser
4. and complete email tasks

Business Wire Magazine wrote, "'The UB-1 provides Seahorse with a fully featured, economical module in an easy to integrate form factor,' said Jeff Alholm, president and chief executive officer of Digital Ocean. 'Combining PCSI's proven cellular voice and data technology with Seahorse's power performance and options makes Seahorse a leading industry choice for users seeking a versatile and affordable handheld computer.'" As such a groundbreaking product, the Seahorse received the Cellular Telephone Industry Association's (CTIA) 1996 award for Product of the Year.

== Technology ==
All Digital Ocean wireless LAN (WLAN) products utilized the company's patented protocol and software technologies along with a direct-sequence spread spectrum radio, giving Digital Ocean products superb penetration through walls, exceptional range, reliable data transfer, secure transmissions, and excellent throughput, especially when compared to infrared LAN communication. Digital Ocean products required no additional network operating hardware or software, and fully supported AppleTalk protocol services.

Digital Ocean developed and sold a complete family of LocalTalk and Ethernet wireless network adapters for use with Macintosh desktops, PowerBooks, and Newtons. In addition, the company's microcellular roaming permitted virtually unlimited wireless coverage areas. Their Starfish Access Points deployed microcellular roaming over a building or campus, allowing seamless wireless LAN connections over the entire area, similar to cellular telephones.

In 1996, Digital Ocean partnered with two other companies to provide Apple and PC platforms with their first ability to be on the same wireless LAN network through a single access point. The solution viewed each computer as an agnostic system when accessing the network, which placed all computers on equal footing in regards to their ability to communicate across an enterprise.

== Chipsets ==
In 1995 and 1996, Digital Ocean entered into three-way development contracts with AT&T/Lucent and Aironet to license Digital Ocean's media access control (MAC) chipset technology in return for access to AT&T/Lucent's semiconductor line, the PHY companion chips for each partner (DSSS and FHSS), plus broad development support from all parties. This work led to one common MAC chip for the three parties. Although branded differently for each partner, this common chip came from one manufacturing line and was then sorted and sold by AT&T/Lucent, Harris Semiconductor/Intersil (which by 1998 had acquired Digital Ocean and its assets), and Aironet/Cisco.

== Patents ==
Before it was ratified as a standard, Digital Ocean was the leader in 802.11 capabilities, placing great emphasis on wireless as the future of communication and technology in general. Digital Ocean's portfolio of around 20 patents weighted heavily in the wireless category. The IEEE had already decided that any standard ratified would need to be at no cost, therefore, as a strategy to maintain their stake in the trajectory of the wireless business, Digital Ocean formed a consortium with its partners to publish an open standard for interoperability among different vendors and their products. They also licensed many of their patents to the emerging 802.11 standard. Some of Digital Ocean's patents included:

- Session management across multiple cells in a microcellular domain without using special or expensive hubs (microcellular roaming).
- Ultra-fast direct sequence acquiring correlator in the RF modem (low power).
- Dynamic priority reservation media access slot assignments in a wireless domain (low power).
- Dynamic migration of coordinating hub functions (unplug and play; no additional software).
- Media access protocol for selectively activating and deactivating the transmitters (low power).
- Media access control technique for user transparent bridging function (unplug and play).
- Technique for bridging LANs having non-unique node addresses (bridging functions between LocalTalk and Ethernet networks).
- An adaptive technique for multi-cell operation using a single-channel wireless data link.
- A method for coding and decoding data for wireless communication.
- Integrated backlight display system for a PDA.
