= ThinkPad 750 =

IBM ThinkPad 750
- Manufacturer: IBM
- Made in: United States: Research Triangle Park, North Carolina (RTP Plant); Japan: Fujisawa, Kanagawa (Fujisawa Plant); United Kingdom: Greenock, Scotland (Greenock Plant); Mexico: Guadalajara, Jalisco (Guadalajara Plant)

The IBM ThinkPad 750 is a series of notebook computers from the ThinkPad series manufactured by IBM.

== Features ==
The 750 series included support for Cellular digital packet data. They also included the pop-up keyboard. The RAM could be expanded with an IC DRAM Card that contained ICs from Hitachi.

== Models ==
- 750 with 486 33Mhz CPU and a monochrome STN display
- 750C with a 486 33Mhz CPU and a desirable 10.4" TFT colour display.
- 750Cs with a 486 33Mhz CPU and a 9.5" DSTN colour display.
- 750P featuring a monochrome display with stylus touch capability, this machine could be converted between an ordinary notebook computer and a stylus tablet-style device.
- 750Ce as the final version with a 486 DX2 50Mhz CPU and 10.4" TFT display.

=== Comparison ===
| Model | Introduction Date | Withdrawal Date | Base Price | Screen Options | CPU Options | Memory (std - max) | Video Controller | Audio Controller | Hard Drive Options | | Misc Info |
|---|---|---|---|---|---|---|---|---|---|---|---|
| 750 | Sep 1993 | Sep 1994 | $3,199 | DSTN 9.5" VGA 640x480 Mono | 80486 SL - 33 MHz Integrated Coprocessor 8 KB cache | 4 - 20 MB 70 ns | Western Digital WD90C24 1 MB DRAM AT | Cirrus CS4248 | ^{170 MB} | ^{340 MB} | 2.88 MB FDD Data/Fax Modem CDPD Ni-HM Battery (5.3 hr) |
| 750Cs | Nov 1993 | Sep 1994 | $2,599 | DSTN 9.5" VGA 640x480 Color | 80486 SL - 33 MHz Integrated Coprocessor 8 KB cache | 4 - 20 MB 70 ns | Western Digital WD90C24 1 MB DRAM AT | Cirrus CS4248 | ^{170 MB} | ^{340 MB} | 2.88 MB FDD Data/Fax Modem CDPD Ni-HM Battery (3.5 hr) |
| 750C | Sep 1993 | Sep 1994 | $4,699 | TFT 10.4" VGA 640x480 Color | 80486 SL - 33 MHz Integrated Coprocessor 8 KB cache | 4 - 20 MB 70 ns | Western Digital WD90C24 1 MB DRAM AT | Cirrus CS4248 | ^{170 MB} | ^{340 MB} | 2.88 MB FDD Data/Fax Modem CDPD Ni-HM Battery (3.4 hr) |
| 750P | Sep 1993 | Sep 1994 | $2,599 | DSTN 9.5" VGA 640x480 Mono | 80486 SL - 33 MHz Integrated Coprocessor 8 KB cache | 4 - 20 MB 70 ns | Western Digital WD90C24 1 MB DRAM AT | Cirrus CS4248 | ^{170 MB} | ^{340 MB} | Pen enabled display 2.88 MB FDD Data/Fax Modem CDPD Ni-HM Battery (5.1 hr) |
| 750Ce | Feb 1994 | Sep 1994 | Unknown | TFT 10.4" VGA 640x480 Color | 80486 DX2 - 50 Mhz Integrated Coprocessor 8Kb cache | 4 - 20 MB 70 ns | Western Digital WD90C24 1 MB DRAM AT | Cirrus CS4248 | ^{170 MB} | ^{340 MB} | Limited-edition, "special-bid" (by request only) model with faster, VLB-compatible GPU 2.88 MB FDD Data/Fax Modem CDPD Ni-HM Battery (5.1 hr) |

== Reception ==
A review of the 750C by the Los Angeles Times noted the excellent screen and the keyboard that be lifted up. It also noted the high price.
