= ThinkPad 770 =

Laptop computer by IBM

IBM ThinkPad 770-series

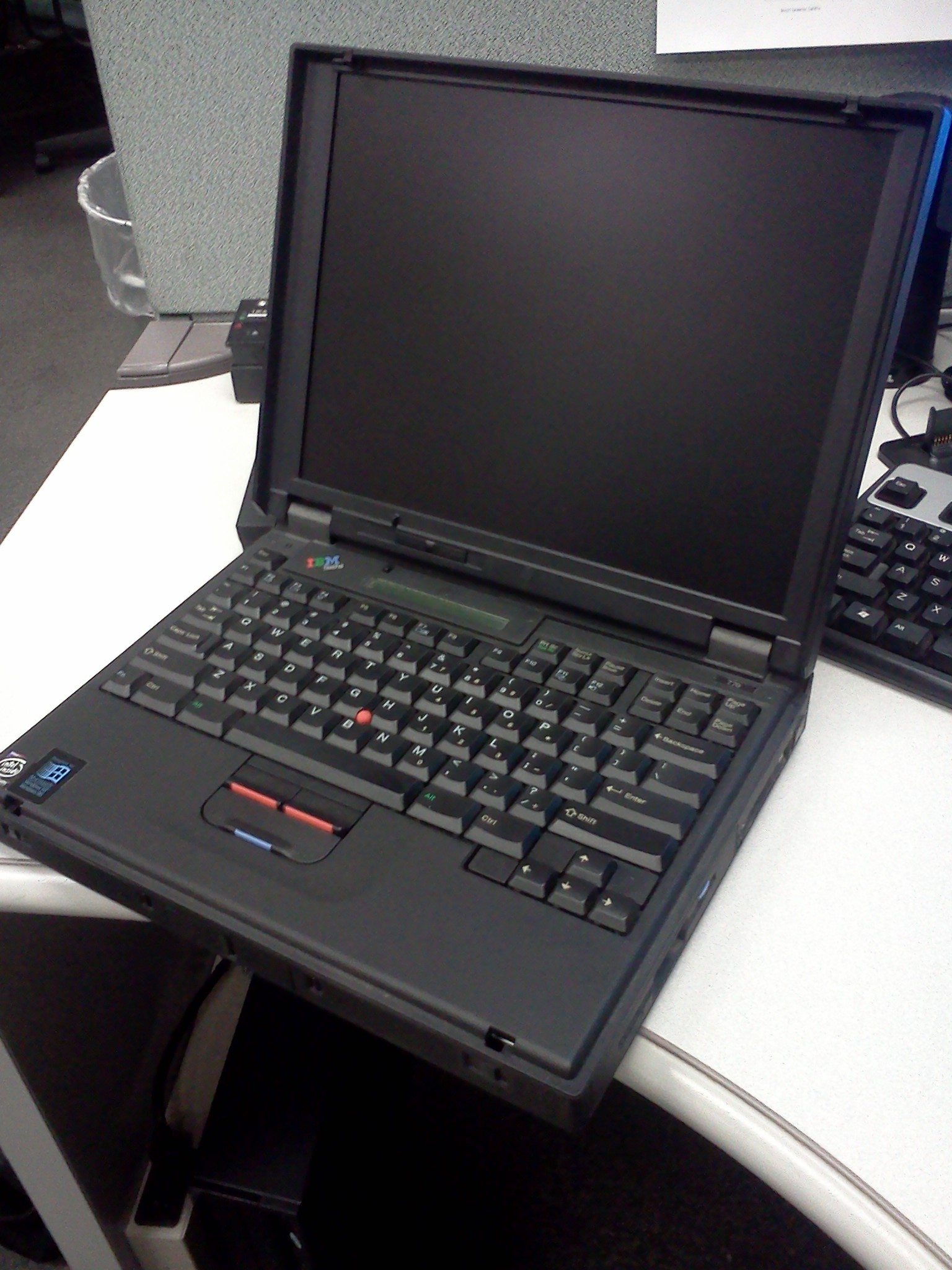
- Manufacturer: IBM
- Introduced: 1997
- Discontinued: 1999
- Processor: Intel Pentium I, Pentium II
- Frequency: 200-366 MHz
- Memory: 64-128 MB PC66 SDRAM
- Ports: Serial, Parallel, VGA out, IBM docking port, IBM external floppy drive port, CardBus, USB 1.0

IBM ThinkPad 770 was a laptop designed and manufactured by IBM targeted for the business, enterprise and professional user. It was the last lineup in the ThinkPad 700-series, succeeding the 760 as the high-end laptop of the ThinkPad lineup. The line was produced from October 1997 to May 2000, and eventually replaced by the ThinkPad models A20m and A20p.

== Features ==
The first 770s were shipped with either Windows NT4 or 95, but later shipped with 98 pre-installed. They were equipped with IBM's Ultrabay II, allowing for the option of either a CD-ROM, floppy drive or 2nd battery.

One notable feature of the ThinkPad 770 is that it was the first laptop available with a DVD-ROM option in addition to a USB port and AC-3 support.

The first 770s featured an Intel Pentium I processor running at 233 MHz but with an optional 266 MHz upgrade. Later models introduced the Intel Pentium II mobile processor, and because these 770s use a certain processor socket, many have had success installing much more powerful processors generating up to 850 MHz. Although most models run at the 1024x768 resolution, some later models are capable of the 1280x1024 resolution. All use Trident Cyber 9397 graphics chips with 2MB memory in the 770, 4MB memory in the 770E/770ED, and 4 or 8MB memory in the 770X/770Z, depending on the resolution.

== Models ==
- IBM ThinkPad 770 - The first 770 introduced in 1997. Available CPU options included the 200 MHz or 233 MHz Pentium MMX processor, came with 32 MB RAM and Windows 95 or Windows NT 4.0 pre-installed.
- IBM ThinkPad 770E - Later model produced shortly after the 770 to introduce the more recently developed Pentium II mobile processor, running at 266 MHz; 13.3" screen option dropped.
- IBM ThinkPad 770ED - Similar to the 770E, but with a DVD-ROM player and MPEG-2 decoder included for DVD-Video playback, and higher standard memory.
- IBM ThinkPad 770X - Model that featured the slightly improved Pentium II that ran at 300 MHz. Graphics used AGP bus as opposed to PCI bus in earlier 770 models. It shipped with 64 MB RAM and Windows 98 or Windows NT 4.0 pre-installed. The 770X also introduced the option for a 13.7" LCD with 1280x1024 screen resolution.
- IBM ThinkPad 770Z - Last of the 770s, this model was similar to the 770X except that it ran the 366 MHz Pentium II CPU with a full-speed cache.

=== Model comparison ===
Model	Introduction Date	Withdrawal Date	Base Price	Display Options		Resolution Options	CPU	Memory (std - max)	Video Controller	Audio Controller	Hard Drive Options			Pre-installed OS	Misc Info
Model	Introduction Date	Withdrawal Date	Base Price	DSTN	TFT	Resolution Options	CPU	Memory (std - max)	Video Controller	Audio Controller	Hard Drive Options			Pre-installed OS	Misc Info
770	Oct 1997	Sep 1998	^{?}	^{−}	^{13.3"}^{14.1"}^{Color}	^{1024x768}	^{Pentium I - 200 or 233 MHz}^{66 MHz bus}^{MMX}^{512 KB cache}	^{32 - 256 MB}^{83 or 100 MHz}^{SDRAM}	^{CYBER9397}^{2 MB SGRAM}^{PCI 2.1}	^{CS4237B}	^{3.2GB}	^{4GB}	^{5.1GB}	Windows 95 or Windows NT 4.0	^{UltraBay II}^{2x Infrared Ports}^{1x USB Port}^{Docking Port}^{Li-Ion Battery}
770E	Apr 1998	Dec 1998	^{?}	^{−}	^{14.1"} ^{Color}	^{1024x768}	^{Pentium II} ^{- 266 MHz}^{66 MHz bus}^{512 KB cache}	^{32 - 288 MB}^{83 or 100 MHz}^{SDRAM}	^{CYBER9397E}^{4 MB SGRAM}^{PCI 2.1}	^{CS4237B}	^{5.1GB}			Windows 95 or Windows NT 4.0	^{UltraBay II}^{2x Infrared Ports}^{1x USB Port}^{Docking Port}^{Li-Ion Battery}
770ED	Apr 1998	Dec 1998	^{?}	^{−}	^{14.1"} ^{Color}	^{1024x768}	^{Pentium II} ^{- 266 MHz}^{66 MHz bus}^{512 KB cache}	^{64 - 288 MB}^{83 or 100 MHz}^{SDRAM}	^{CYBER9397E}^{4 MB SGRAM}^{PCI 2.1}	^{CS4237B}	^{8.1GB}			Windows 95 or Windows NT 4.0	^{UltraBay II}^{2x Infrared Ports}^{1x USB Port}^{Docking Port}^{Li-Ion Battery}
770X	Oct 1998	Jun 1999	^{?}	^{−}	^{13.7"}^{14.1"}^{Color}	^{1024x768}^{1280x1024}	^{Pentium II} ^{- 300 MHz}^{66 MHz bus}^{512 KB cache}	^{64 - 320 MB}^{66 MHz}^{SDRAM}	^{CYBER9397DVD}^{4-8 MB SGRAM}^{AGP 1X}	^{CS4239}^{CS4610}	^{8.1GB}			Windows 98 or Windows NT 4.0	^{UltraBay II}^{2x Infrared Ports}^{1x USB Port}^{Docking Port}^{Li-Ion Battery}
770Z	Feb 1999	Dec 1999	^{?}	-	^{13.7"}^{14.1"}^{Color}	^{1024x768}^{1280x1024}	^{Pentium II} ^{- 366 MHz}^{66 MHz bus}^{512 KB cache}	^{128 - 320 MB}^{66 MHz}^{SDRAM}	^{CYBER9397DVD}^{4-8 MB SGRAM}^{AGP 1X}	^{CS4239}^{CS4610}	^{14.1GB}			Windows 98 or Windows NT 4.0	^{UltraBay II}^{2x Infrared Ports}^{1x USB Port}^{Docking Port}^{Li-Ion Battery}

== Reception ==
The ThinkPad 770 won the Technical Excellence Award by PCMag in December 1997.

Preceded by IBM ThinkPad 760	IBM ThinkPad 770; October 1997-October 1999	Succeeded by IBM ThinkPad 600X; IBM ThinkPad 390X
