= OmniSky =

Musicblog

- Industry: Technology
- Founded: May 7, 1999
- Defunct: December 2001
- Fate: Sold to EarthLink
- Headquarters: San Francisco Bay, California

OmniSky was a dotcom-era Silicon Valley startup, focused on web-enabled, wireless, mobile touchscreen products and services. Their wireless connectivity was built on CDPD technology. The modems supported Palm V and Handspring, Inc. Visor handhelds. OmniSky produced the first touchscreen handset to integrate Google's search engine. OmniSky was founded on May 7, 1999 and held an IPO through NASDAQ on September 21, 2000. It generated no revenue in 1999 and prior to its IPO it reported a lifetime total of $2.1 million revenue compared to a loss of more than $40 million. By November 2001 OmniSky reported that it was no longer able to complete its financial statements due to a possible pending bankruptcy. OmniSky sold to EarthLink in December 2001.
