= ThinkPad 600 =

Computer model by IBM

IBM ThinkPad 600 series

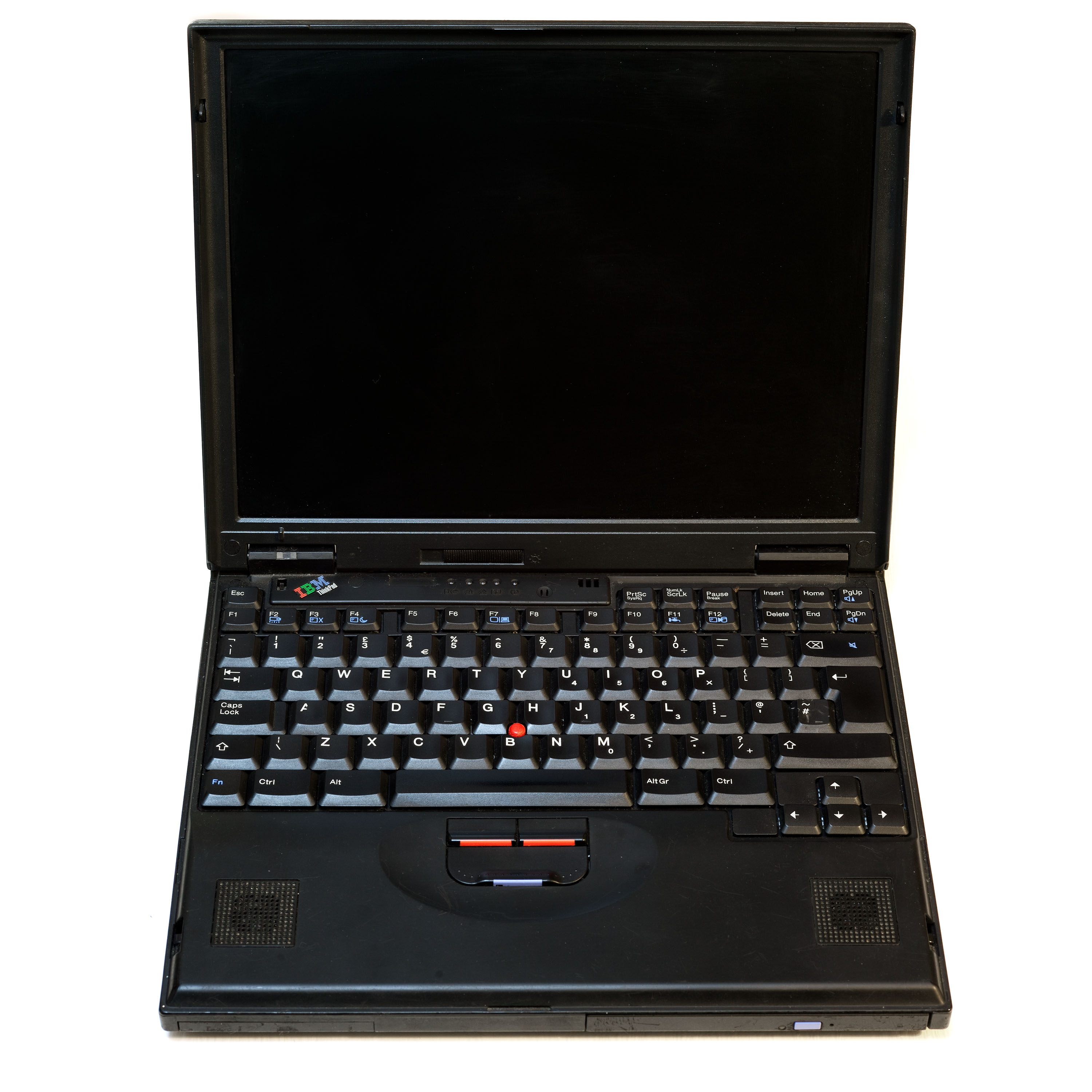
- IBM ThinkPad 600X
- Manufacturer: IBM
- Released: 1998
- Discontinued: 2000
- CPU: 233 MHz - 650 MHz, Pentium MMX; Pentium II; Pentium III
- Memory: 32-64 MB SDRAM (PC66 on 600/E, PC100 on 600X)
- Connectivity: Serial, Parallel, VGA out, USB, IBM docking port, IBM external floppy drive port, CardBus, Video Out
- Website: pc.ibm.com/us/thinkpad/600series at the Wayback Machine (archived 2000-05-11)

The IBM ThinkPad 600 series was a series of notebook computers introduced in 1998 by IBM as a lighter and slimmer alternative to the 770 series. Three models were produced, the 600, 600E, and 600X; the series was succeeded in 2000 by the ThinkPad T20 series.

== Design ==
The ThinkPad 600 won an International Design Excellent Award (IDEA) in 1999. It was the first ThinkPad to feature chamfered edges to give the illusion of a thinner laptop. This was done in response to testing conducted by the design team led by David Hill that thin devices were associated with advanced technology.

== Features ==
The 600 series was designed to be a more portable version of the 770 series, featuring slimmer dimensions and a weight of around 5 pounds (2.3 kg), by using lightweight but strong carbon fiber composite plastics. The 600 series also introduced the new UltraSlimBay (not to be confused with the UltraBay Slim as found on the later T40/T60 series), as well as easily interchangeable RAM and hard drives; all 600 series machines shipped with 32 or 64 MB of RAM integrated on the motherboard from the factory.

The 600 series originally shipped with either Windows 95 or Windows NT 4.0, with later models shipping with Windows 98 or Windows 2000; all 600 models could also run Windows 3.x, OS/2 Warp 4, Windows Me, or Windows XP as well as various Linux distributions. None of the 600 series models included wireless adapters or Ethernet ports as an option, but these could be added through a third-party PCMCIA/CardBus card.

One common problem of the 600 series was a battery defect, where the battery would discharge rapidly or otherwise have a poor battery life; use of a third-party battery as well as a BIOS update can help alleviate this problem. Another problem were the speakers were placed where the hands would rest to type on the keyboard, blocking them while typing.

== Models ==
- ThinkPad 600 - First model shipped, featured either a Pentium MMX at 233 MHz or a Pentium II at 233, 266 or 300 MHz. This model had the option of either a 12.1" SVGA TFT display, a 13.0" XGA HPA display, or a 13.3" XGA TFT display, and shipped with an external floppy drive, a built-in CD-ROM drive, and a choice of a 3.2 GB, 4.0 GB, or a 5.1 GB hard drive. The 600 also had infrared, USB 1.0, and a modem as standard features, and shipped with either 32 MB or 64 MB of RAM (upgradeable to 288 MB/320 MB using PC66 SODIMMs)
- ThinkPad 600E - Featuring a Pentium II processor at either 300 MHz, 366 MHz, or 400 MHz, all models of the 600E featured at 13.3" XGA TFT display as standard. This model shipped with an external floppy drive, built-in CD-ROM, either a 4.0 GB, 6.4 GB or 10 GB hard drive, and 32 MB or 64 MB of RAM on the motherboard (upgradeable to 288 MB/320 MB/512 MB using PC66 SODIMMs). The 600E also was the first of the 600 series to offer a DVD-ROM drive as an option, as well as a TV output port (using a special dongle that was supplied to provide composite and S-Video ports).
- ThinkPad 600X - The final model of the 600 series, featuring a Pentium III at either 450 MHz, 500 MHz, or 650 MHz (with SpeedStep technology) and a 13.3" XGA TFT display as standard. This model shipped with a 6 GB or 12 GB hard drive, a Mini-PCI Modem, either a CD-ROM or DVD-ROM drive, and 64 MB of RAM on the motherboard (upgradeable to 512 MB using PC100 SODIMMs).

=== Comparison ===
Model	Introduction Date	Withdrawal Date	Base Price	Display Options		Resolution Options	CPU	Memory	Video Controller	Audio Controller	Hard Drive Options				Misc Info
Model	Introduction Date	Withdrawal Date	Base Price	TFT	HPA	Resolution Options	CPU	Memory	Video Controller	Audio Controller	Hard Drive Options				Misc Info
600	Apr 1998	Aug 1998	?	12.1" 13.3" Color	13.0" Color	640x480 800x600 1024x768 (XGA)	Pentium I - 233 MHzMMX 66 MHz Bus 512 KB cache or Pentium II - 233-266 MHz 66 MHz Bus 512 KB cache	32-288 MB 66 MHz SDRAM	NeoMagic NM2160B 2MB iDRAM	Cirrus CS4237B	3.2 GB	4.0 GB	6.4 GB	10 GB	UltraslimBay options: 1.44 MB FDD; 20-8X CD-ROM; 2X DVD-ROM; SuperDisk; Li-Ion Battery - 3 hr
600 (Sep 98)	Sep 1998	Jun 1999	?	13.3" Color	-	640x480 800x600 1024x768	Pentium II - 300 MHz 66 MHz Bus 512 KB cache	64-288 MB 66 MHz SDRAM	NeoMagic NM2160B 2MB iDRAM	Cirrus CS4237B	5.1 GB	6.4 GB		10 GB	UltraslimBay options: 1.44 MB FDD; 20-8X CD-ROM; 2X DVD-ROM; SuperDisk; Li-Ion Battery - 3 hr
600E	Nov 1998	Mar 1999	?	13.3" Color	-	640x480 800x600 1024x768	Pentium II - 300 MHz 66 MHz Bus 512 KB cache	32-288 MB 66 MHz SDRAM	NeoMagic NM2200 2.5 MB SGRAM AGP	Cirrus CS4239 ISA CS4610 PCI	6.4 GB		10 GB		UltraslimBay options: 1.44 MB FDD; 24-10X CD-ROM; 2X DVD-ROM; SuperDisk; Li-Ion Battery - 3 hr
600E (1999)	Mar 1999	Mar 2000	?	13.3" Color	-	640x480 800x600 1024x768	Pentium II - 300-366 MHz 66 MHz Bus 256 KB cache	32-288 MB 66 MHz SDRAM	NeoMagic NM2200 2.5 MB SGRAM AGP	Cirrus CS4239 ISA CS4610 PCI	4.0 GB	6.4 GB	10 GB		UltraslimBay options: 1.44 MB FDD; 24-10X CD-ROM; DVD-ROM; Li-Ion Battery - 3 hr
600E (400)	Jun 1999	Jan 2001	?	13.3" Color	-	640x480 800x600 1024x768	Pentium II - 400 MHz 66 MHz Bus 256 KB cache	64-288 MB 66 MHz SDRAM	NeoMagic NM2200 2.5 MB SGRAM AGP	Cirrus CS4239 ISA CS4610 PCI	6.4 GB		10 GB		UltraslimBay options: 1.44 MB FDD; 24-10X CD-ROM; DVD-ROM; Li-Ion Battery - 3 hr
600X	Dec 1999	Jan 2001	?	13.3" Color	-	640x480 800x600 1024x768	Pentium III - 450-500 MHz 100 MHz Bus 256 KB cache	64-576 MB 100 MHz SDRAM	NeoMagic NM2360 4 MB SGRAM AGP	Cirrus CS4624 CS4297A	6.0 GB	12.0 GB		18.0 GB	UltraslimBay options: 1.44 MB FDD; 24-10X CD-ROM; DVD-ROM; Li-Ion Battery - 3 hr
600X (2000)	Feb 2000	Feb 2001	?	13.3" Color	-	640x480 800x600 1024x768	Pentium III - 500-650 MHz 100 MHz Bus 256 KB cache	64-576 MB 100 MHz SDRAM	NeoMagic NM2360 4 MB SGRAM AGP	Cirrus CS4624 CS4297A	6.0 GB	12.0 GB		18.0 GB	UltraslimBay options: 1.44 MB FDD; 24-10X CD-ROM; DVD-ROM; Li-Ion Battery - 3 hr

Preceded by IBM ThinkPad 560	IBM ThinkPad 600; April 1998-December 2000	Succeeded by IBM ThinkPad T20
