= Panasonic CF-V21P =

Series of laptops by Panasonic

CF-V21P
- Developer: Panasonic
- Manufacturer: Panasonic
- Type: Laptop (notebook)
- Released: October 1993; 32 years ago
- CPU: Intel i486SX at 25 MHz; Intel i486DX2 at 50 MHz; Intel i486DX4 at 75 MHz
- Memory: 4–20 MB RAM
- Storage: 80–450 MB HDD
- Display: 9.5-inch monochrome STN (optionally touchscreen); 10.4-inch color TFT (non-touchscreen)
- Weight: 5.7 to 8.2 pounds (2.6 to 3.7 kg)

The CF-V21P is a notebook-sized laptop released by Panasonic in 1993. It was the first notebook computer to have an integrated CD-ROM drive as an option, albeit it only supports up to 3.5-inch-diameter mini CDs instead of standard 4.7-inch-diameter discs. It was discontinued in 1994.

== Specifications ==
On its release in October 1993, the stock CF-V21P featured an Intel i486SX microprocessor clocked at 25 MHz, initially upgradable to a 50-MHz i486DX2. Later, the company made the i486DX4 clocked at 75 MHz available as a processor upgrade. The stock amount of RAM on the motherboard is 4 MB, expandable to up to 20 MB with aftermarket RAM cards. The notebook was sold with either 80 MB or 120 MB internal hard disk drives, with a 450 MB drive later made an option on the high-end. For a pointing device, Panasonic built the CF-V21P with a trackball positioned at the center of the palm rest, with the left- and right-click buttons to either side of it.

For screen technology, the notebook was optioned with either a 9.5-inch monochrome STN display; a 10.4-inch color TFT display; or a 9.5-inch STN touchscreen with pen stylus. The notebook features a modular design, with the screen housing able to be detached from the bottom housing and either removed (for upgrading); or flipped around and closed onto the keyboard, making the laptop able to be operated like a tablet computer (useful when equipped with the touchscreen display). All displays were native VGA resolution: 640 × 480 pixels. The on-board graphics chip contains 1 MB of on-die VRAM, supporting a maximum resolution of 1024 × 768 pixels at 256 colors on an external monitor.

Besides the two type-II or one type-III PC Cards, the CF-V21P supports a number of optional accessories via a multibay slot on the side of the computer—trademarked by Panasonic as the "Multimedia Pocket". In this multibaby fits either a 3.5-inch floppy drive, a second NiMH battery, a TV tuner card (allowing the laptop to be used as a television receiver), or a CD-ROM drive. The lattermost option made the CF-V21P the first notebook computer on the market to have an integrated CD-ROM drive as an option. However, it was hamstrung by the nonstandard maximum dimension of its supported media—3.5-inch-diameter mini CDs (compared to the 4.7-inch diameter of standard CDs)—for which very little commercial software on the market was available on its release. One industry analyst surmised that this option may have appealed to those who had access to early CD-R burners, which in 1993 were very expensive. Alternatively, it may have appealed to large companies planning to purchase fleets of the CF-V21P; many of these companies had contracts with CD-ROM mastering facilities capable of manufacturing mini CDs containing proprietary software relevant to internal company functions.

Panasonic also offered for the CF-V21P a port replicator and a docking station, the latter of which houses 16-bit ISA slots for yet more options, including a Pentium upgrade board and a capture card to store analog video onto the hard drive. As stock, the CF-V21P has no on-board audio; Panasonic sold a 16-bit PC Card sound card to allow the notebook to classify as a multimedia PC. Depending on the configuration ordered, the CF-V21P weighs between 5.7 to 8.2 pounds (2.6 to 3.7 kg).

== Development ==
The CF-V21P was designed and manufactured by Panasonic in Japan. The company's plants were equipped to produce between 40,000 and 50,000 units of the CF-V21P in a 12-month period. (Note: PC Week remarked that Panasonic was likely unable to meet the high demand for the CF-V21P.) The company produced the LCD panels in-house, while Intel provided the chipset and Western Digital provided the on-board graphics chip.

== Reception and legacy ==
Anush Yegyazarian of PC Magazine concluded that the CF-V21P "offers a lot of flexibility for upgrading (or downgrading) to suit most user needs, but [it] lags in performance". Specifically, he rated the computer's raw number-crunching performance below-average, as was its hard drive performance, although graphical performance scored high marks. Clare Newsome of PC User found the notebook "an impressive piece of design which takes notebook modularity and upgradability to a new level. Unfortunately this level is both beyond the budgets of many users and the developments of software vendors, who have yet to accept the 3.5-inch CD format". Alan Zisman of Our Computer Player lauded its "plenty fast" i486 processor and the "lovely, bright" display of the TFT model, although he remarked that the high power consumption of these components resulted in a limited battery life of under two hours. While he praised the notebook's modular design as innovative, he pointed to several compromises, including an "unaccountably slow" hard drive and a "slightly smaller than normal" keyboard. PC World's Bryan Hastings called the TFT display of his review unit "luxurious" and was impressed by the large hard drive but found the battery life subpar and the notebook overall overpriced for most users.

Panasonic followed up the CF-V21P with the V41 in late 1994, which added a full-sized CD-ROM drive. It was preceded by IBM's ThinkPad 755CD, released in October 1994, which was the first notebook computer with a full-sized CD-ROM drive.
