= Trident Microsystems =

Graphics hardware company

Trident Microsystems Inc.
- Type: Public
- Traded as: Nasdaq: TRID
- Industry: Fabless semiconductors
- Founded: 1987; 39 years ago
- Founder: Frank C. Lin
- Defunct: 2012
- Fate: Chapter 11 bankruptcy
- Headquarters: Santa Clara, California, U.S.
- Key people: Frank C. Lin (CEO and chairman, 1987-2006); Jung-Herng Chang (Vice President of Engineering/President, 1995-2008); John S. Edmunds (CFO, 2004-2008); Sylvia Summers (CEO, 2007-2011)
- Products: TVGA 8900C, TVGA 9000, TGUI 9440, Cyber 9525DVD, SVP-EX, SVP-LX, SVP-CX, SVP-PX, 4DWave DX, 4DWave NX
- Brands: TVGA, DPTV, SVP, DCRe, HiDTV
- Revenue: US$271 million (FY 2007)
- Operating income: US$40 million (FY 2007)
- Net income: US$30 million (FY 2007)
- Number of employees: 565 (2008)
- Website: tridentmicro.com at the Wayback Machine (archived 2005-03-30)

Trident Microsystems Inc. was an American fabless semiconductor company that became in the 1990s a well-known supplier of integrated circuits (commonly called "chips") for video display controllers used in video cards and on motherboards for desktop PCs and laptops. In 2003, it transformed itself into being a supplier of display processors for digital televisions, and primarily LCD TVs starting from 2005, at a time when the global LCD TV market started showing strong growth.

It filed for bankruptcy protection in January 2012 and the delisting of its common stock from the NASDAQ stock market was announced shortly thereafter.

== History ==
=== PC graphics ===
Established in 1987, Trident gained a reputation for selling inexpensive (for the time) but slow SVGA components. Many OEMs built add-in-boards using Trident VGA chipsets. As the PC graphics market shifted from simple framebuffer displays (basic VGA color monitor and later multi-resolution SVGA output) to more advanced 2D hardware acceleration such a BitBLT engine and color-space conversion (not to be confused with 3D hardware-acceleration), Trident continued its strategy of selling modestly performing chips at compelling price points. In the mid-1990s, the company (briefly) caught up with its main competition: the TGUI-9680's feature-set was comparable to the S3 Graphics Trio64V+, although the Trio64V+ outperformed the 9680 in true-color mode.

The rapid introduction of 3D graphics caught many graphics suppliers off guard, including Trident. It was not until the late 1990s that Trident finally released a competitive chip, the TGUI-9880 (Blade3D). By this time, Trident's reach had once again retreated to the low-end OEM market, where it was crowded by ATI, S3, and SiS.

Meanwhile, in the laptop market, Trident was an early pioneer of embedded DRAM, a semiconductor manufacturing technique which combines a graphics-controller and framebuffer memory on a single chip. The resulting combo-chip saved precious board-space by eliminating several RAM chips normally required for framebuffer storage as well as providing other advantages, offset by a higher manufacturing cost-per-bit. In this market it competed with NeoMagic.

Although Trident enjoyed some success with its 3DImage and Blade3D product-lines, the entry of Intel into PC graphics signaled the end of the bottom-end, graphics-chip market. Trident partnered with motherboard chipset suppliers several times to integrate its graphics technology into a motherboard chipset (i.e. ALi CyberALADDiN, VIA MVP4), but these achieved marginal success.

=== Supplier of digital TV products ===
Faced with a contracting market and rising research and development costs (due to the increasing sophistication of 3D-graphics rendering), Trident announced a substantial restructuring of the company in June 2003. In late 2003, XGI completed the acquisition of Trident's former graphics division, completing the transformation of the company into one focusing on DTV products. From this point on, Trident's research and development was mainly concentrated at its facilities in Shanghai, China, and a fully owned 115,000-square-foot research and development facility in Shanghai was completed in 2007.

Trident quickly gained success in the LCD TV chip market in 2005, providing competitive advantages in image quality and chip integration, outcompeting incumbent flat-panel IC leader Genesis Microchip and supplying chips to leading LCD TV brands Sony and Samsung, and later Sharp and Philips. Its revenues increased from $69 million in the fiscal year ended June 30, 2005, to $270 million in fiscal year 2007, when it had net income of $30 million. This success allowed the company to increase its cash reserves to more than $200 million by 2008.

After an investigation into accounting irregularities relating to stock options, in November 2006 the company's chairman and CEO resigned, which was followed by the departure of further key personnel, including its president and former vice president of engineering in early 2008.

By 2008 as DTV manufacturers started integrating more functionality (such as motion compensation/estimation and MPEG decoding) into a single chip, its fortunes turned and its sales quickly declined to $76 million in fiscal year 2009, for which it posted a loss of $70 million. The primary competitors taking away market share from Trident at the time were MediaTek, MStar Semiconductor, Zoran Corporation and in-house chip design at Samsung and other LCD TV manufacturers, while ST Microelectronics (who had acquired Genesis) remained a significant player.

Under new management, in May 2009 Trident completed the acquisition of selected assets of the frame rate converter (FRC), demodulator and audio product lines from TDK-Micronas. In October 2009 Trident announced a deal with NXP Semiconductors to transfer NXP's TV and STB businesses to Trident, with NXP becoming a significant shareholder. The deal was closed in February 2010.

The Micronas and NXP acquisitions involved a substantial and diverse product portfolio and a large number of employees in widely dispersed operations in the U.S., Europe, Asia, and other locations. The acquisitions significantly increased the Trident's revenues to $557 million in 2010 but also greatly worsened its profitability and cash flow, resulting in a loss from operations of $173 million in 2010 and net loss of $129 million. According to unaudited results for 2011, revenues decreased by 46.5% in 2011, resulting in another net loss of $150 million.

On January 4, 2012, Trident filed for Chapter 11 bankruptcy protection appointing Entropic Communications as the stalking horse bidder. In February 2012, Entropic announced it would buy Trident's set-top box chip business for $60 million. In June 2012, Cambridge Silicon Radio paid $1M for Trident's audio products. Around the same time Sigma Designs purchased Trident's remaining TV chip business.

== Stock price, stock option practices and litigation ==
Trident common shares traded on the NASDAQ stock market from its initial public offering on December 16, 1992 to 2012. The stock split two-for-one on 21 November 2005 and reached a high of $31.07 on 19 April 2006, representing a market capitalization of approximately $1.9 billion. (Note: 61 million shares outstanding multiplied by share price of $31.07) It later declined substantially including a large drop on 26 October 2007. The stock dropped below $3 in September 2008 and it would never close above $3 again.

In November 2005, Trident announced that its founding chairman and CEO, who owned 10% or more of the company's shares, had established a pre-arranged trading plan to sell up to 1,250,000 pre-split shares of common stock.

In November 2006, Trident announced the resignation of its founder and CEO following an investigation by a special committee into back-dating of stock option grants, and announced that it would restate its financial results for the period 1994 to 2006 to reflect non-cash charges for stock based compensation expense.

The U.S. Securities and Exchange Commission in 2010 announced a settlement with Trident's founder and former CEO and with Trident's former chief accounting officer, relating to a complaint alleging illegal back-dating of stock options in the period from 1993 to 2006. As part of the settlement, the former CEO agreed to be barred for five years from serving as an officer or director of any company registered with the SEC and to pay a $350,000 penalty and a disgorgement (representing the benefit gained from the back-dating of stock options) of $817,500 payable to Trident. In 2011, Trident reached a settlement with its former CEO resulting from a derivative shareholder suit that resulted in payment of $9.4 million to the company.

== Graphics chipsets ==
The following lists are not complete.

=== Desktop ===
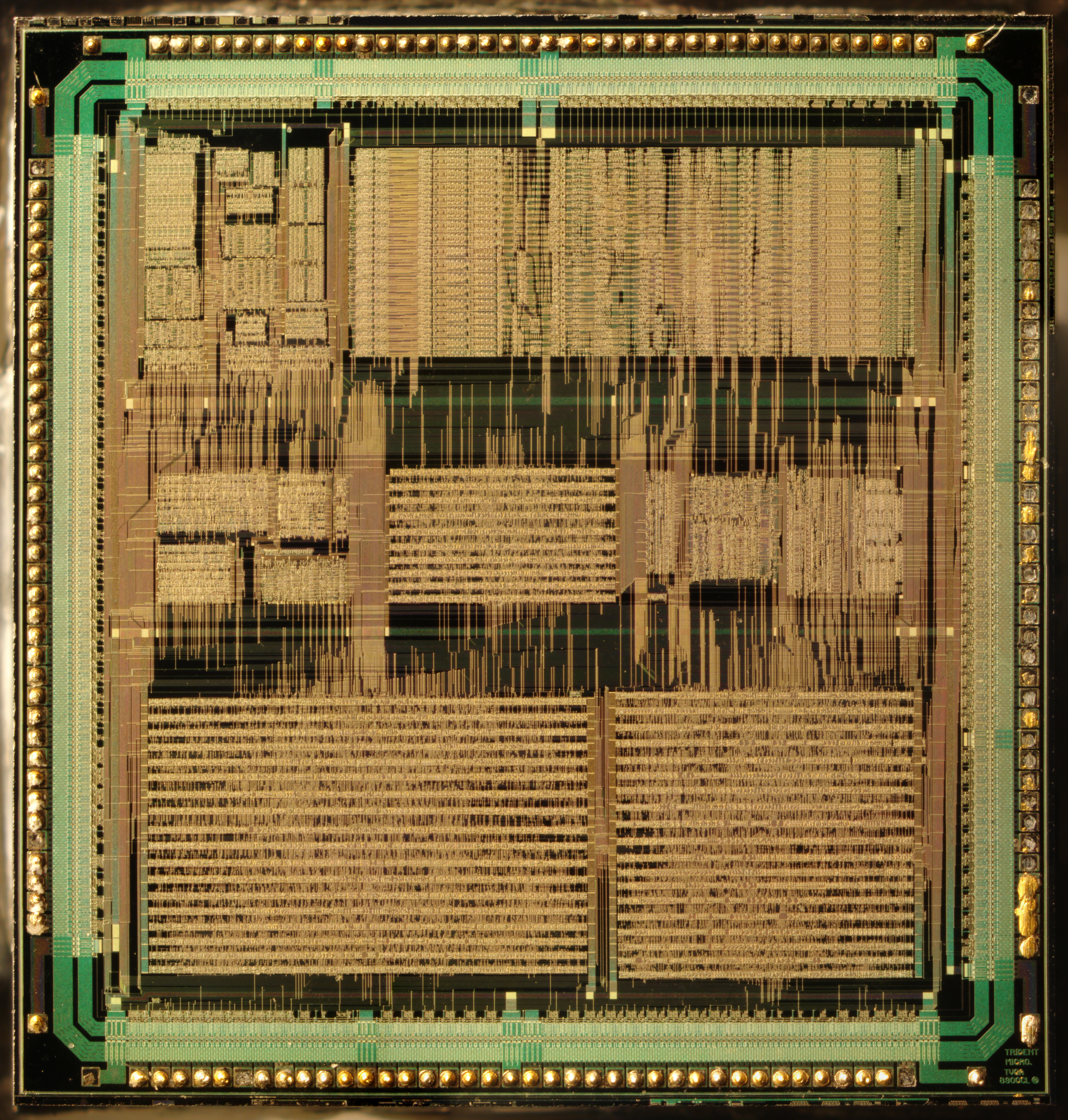
Die shot of a TVGA8900 chipset

- TVGA8200LX (1987)
- TVGA8800 (1988) - first S/VGA compatible chipset (ISA), 512 KB framebuffer
  - TVGA8800BR (512 KB, 128 KB banks only)
  - TVGA8800CS (512 KB, 64 KB banks + old/new mode support)

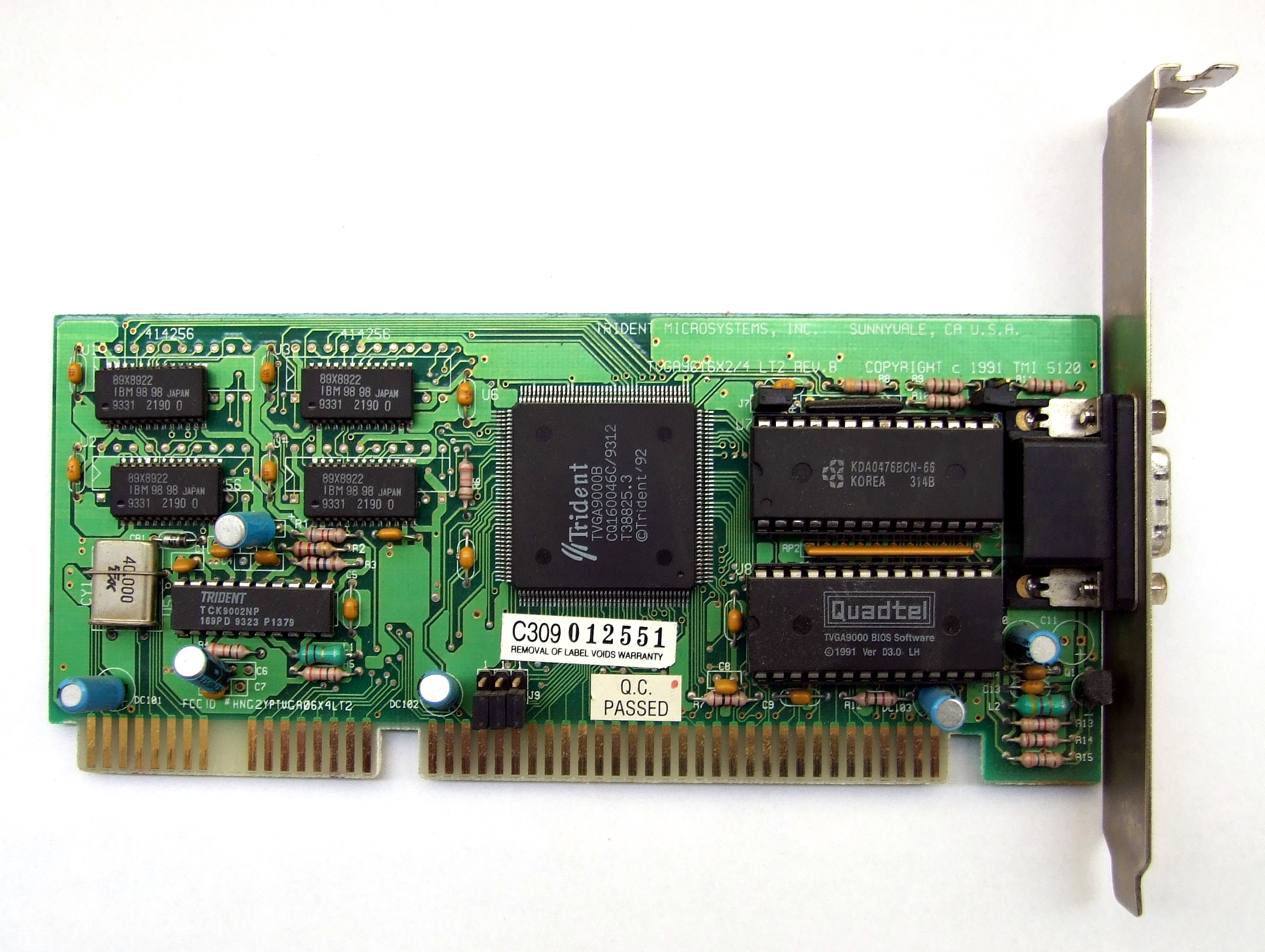
A ISA port, Trident SVGA card with TVGA9000B chip

- TVGA8900 series - high-color (65,536) display-mode support, 1 MB framebuffer
  - TVGA8900B (up to 1 MB)
  - TVGA8900C (up to 1 MB, SVGA, ISA)
  - TVGA8900CL (up to 1 MB, SVGA, ISA/VLB. Slightly faster than earlier 8900 cards)
  - TVGA8900D (1992, up to 1 MB, 8900CL with bugs corrected)
  - TVGA8900D-R (1994, SVGA, ISA, up to 1 MB)
- TVGA9000 series - first integrated (VGA + RAMDAC) VGA chipset
  - TVGA9000 (low component version)
  - TVGA9000B (1992)
  - TVGA9000C (1992) - External RAMDAC
  - TVGA9000i - (rev. a/b/c, 512 KB, 9000 with on-chip 15/16bit DAC and clock generator)
  - TVGA9000i-1 (1994) - appeared on Trident's VC512TM ISA video cards
  - TVGA9000i-2 (1994)
  - TVGA9000i-3 (1994)
  - TVGA9100B - Slightly faster 9000
- TVGA 92xx, TVGA 94xx - first Windows accelerators
  - TVGA9200CXr
  - TVGA9400CXi (max 2 MB, True Color, on-chip 24-bit DAC + clock gen)
  - TVGA9420DGi (PCI, 9400 w/ 2D acceleration [BitBLT, ...])
  - TVGA9430DGi (PCI, 9420 w/ hardware cursor)

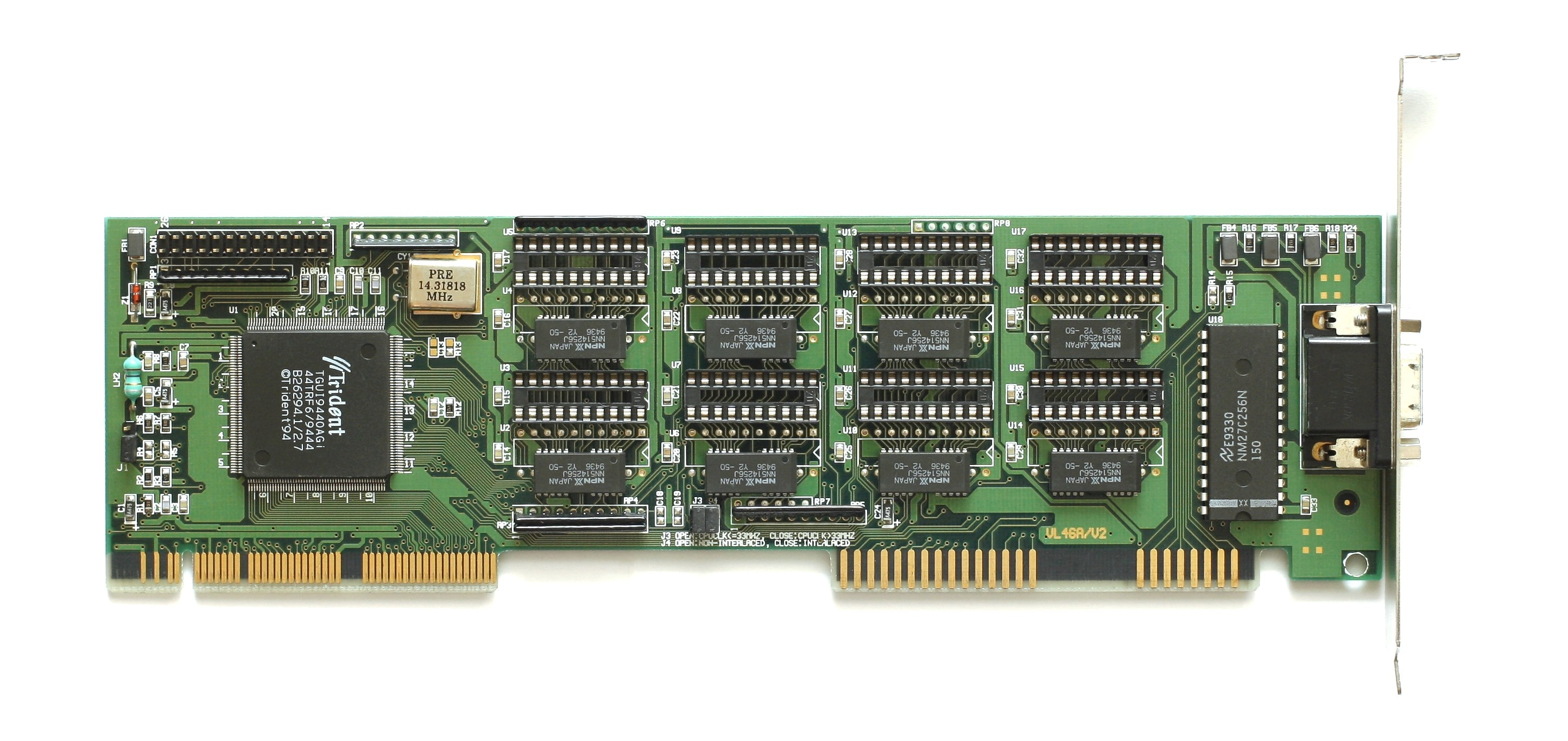
Video card with Trident TGUI9440AGi

- TGUI944x series - first performance-competitive Windows 2D-accelerators
  - TGUI9440 (1994) - Integrated true-color DAC and 108 MHz clock synthesizer, 1/2 MB PCI/VLB
  - TGUI9440AGi (PCI/VLB, 9430 w/ 16bit DAC interface + programmable clock)
  - TGUI9440-2 (9440-R) - PCI, integrated true-color DAC, clock synthesizer and ROM BIOS
  - TGUI9440-3 - PCI/ISA bus, similar to TGUI9440-2. Differently designed Trident logo, rare
  - TGUI9460
  - TGUI9470

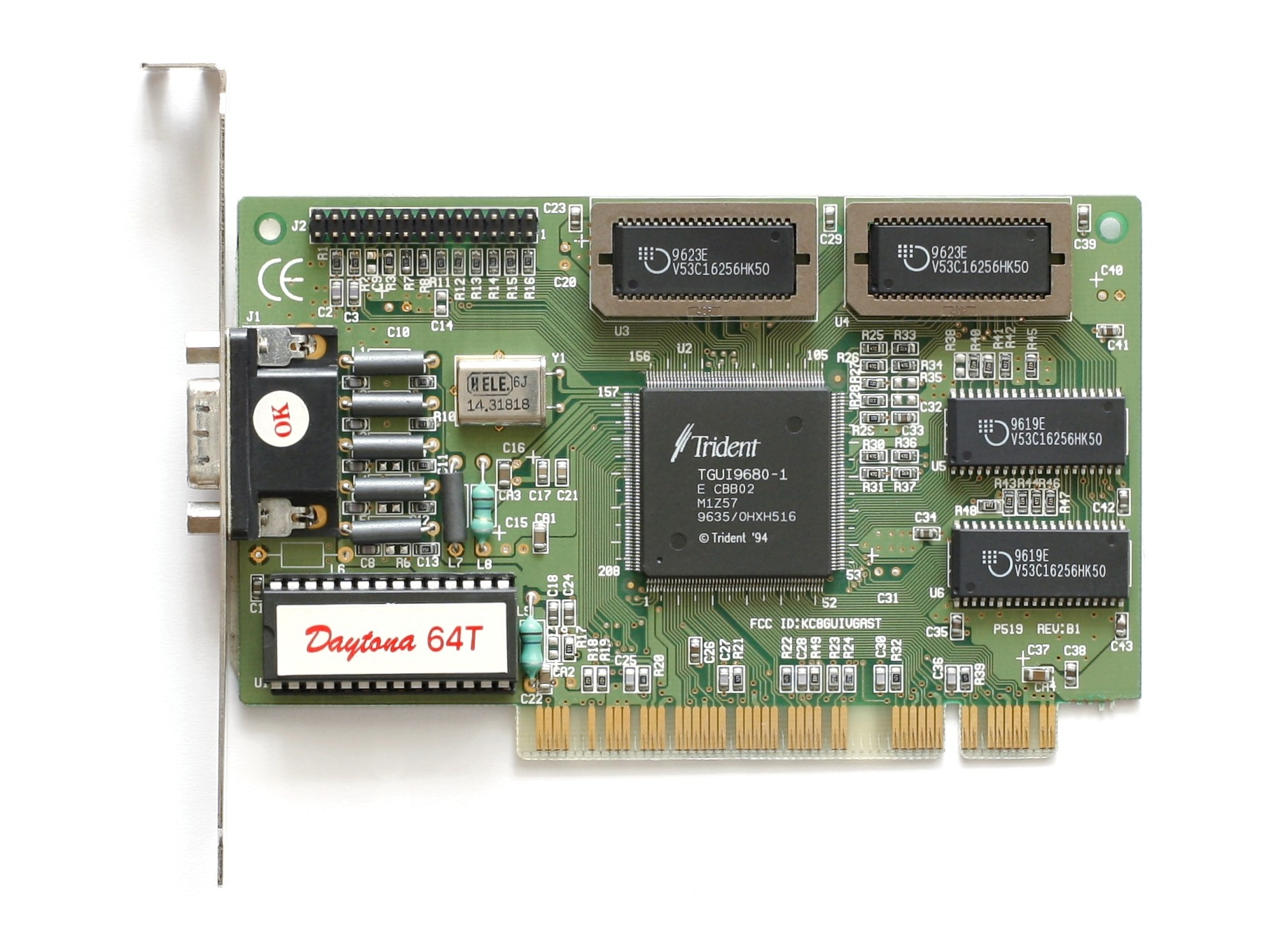
Video card with Trident TGUI9680 (Daytona 64T), manufactured by Palit Microsystems

- TGUI966x - Shared feature set with TGUI968x. 135 MHz clock synthesizer, first generation 64-bit DRAM interface.
  - TGUI9660
  - TGUI9660XGi
- TGUI968x - Feature motion video accelerator (zoom + YUV to RGB color space conversion, DirectDraw overlay)
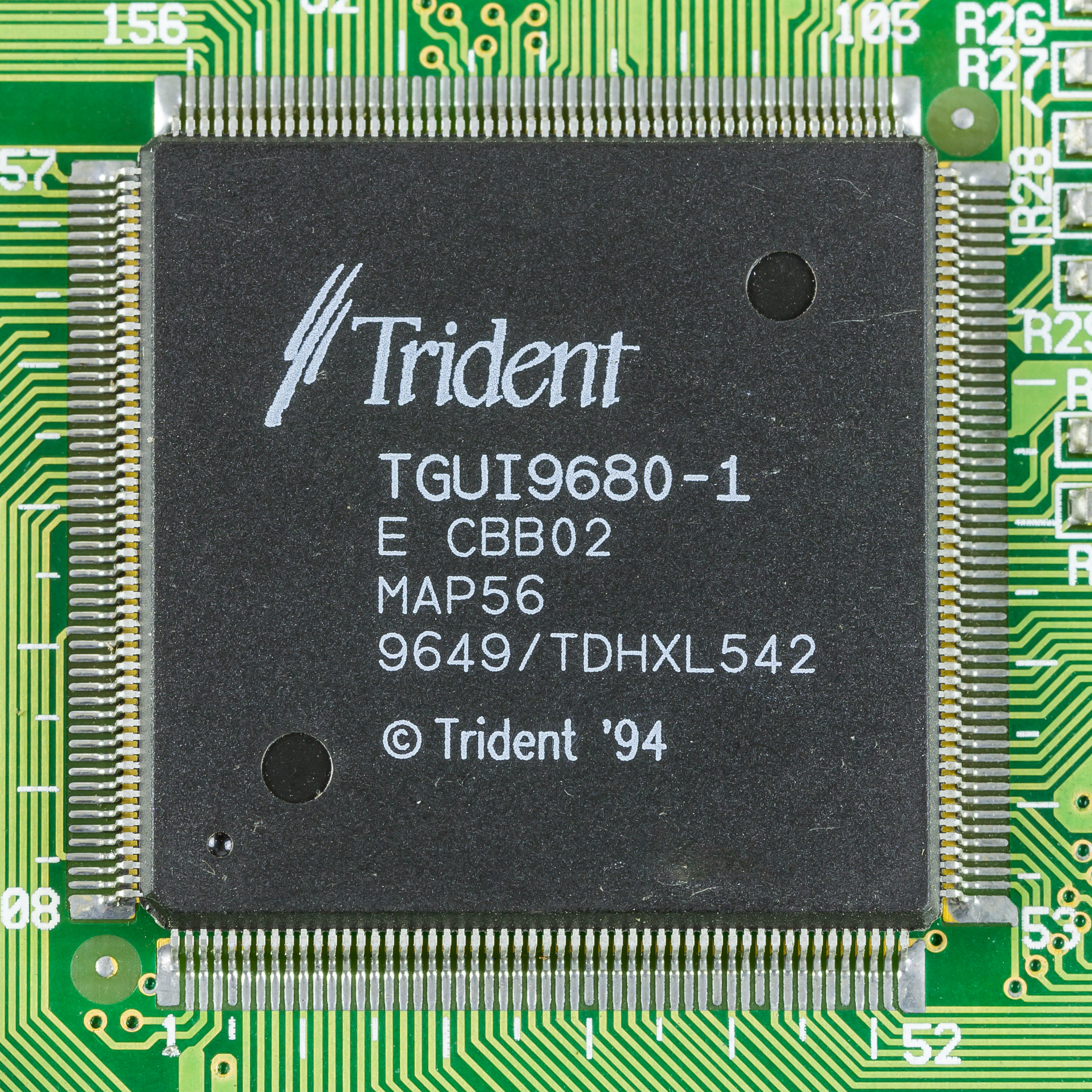
  Trident TGUI9680
  - TGUI9680 - PCI/VLB, 32/64-bit interface to 1–4 MB FPM/EDO DRAM or WRAM
  - TGUI9680-1 - Lower power and improved video quality compared to TGUI9680
  - TGUI9680XGi
  - ProVidia 9682 (TGUI9680 with video in and support for Unified Memory Architecture with certain core logic chipsets)
  - ProVidia 9683
  - ProVidia 9685 (TV video out, UMA)

AGP video card with Trident 3DImage9750 chipset

- 3DImage series - first Windows-3D accelerators (4–8 MB PCI/AGP)
  - 3DImage 9750 (64bit, PCI/AGP, TV out)
  - 3DImage 9753
  - 3DImage 9753WAVE (9753 + 32 voice wavetable, 0.35ym, 208PQFP)
  - 3DImage 9754
  - 3DImage 9750DVD (9750 with DVD decoder)
  - 3DImage 9783
  - 3DImage 9785
  - 3DImage 9850 (Faster 9750 core, AGP2X, AGP only)
  - 3DImage 985DVD (DVD acceleration)
  - 3DImage 9850+ (Faster)
- Blade3D (1999) - first performance-competitive Windows 3D-accelerators
  - Blade3D 9880 (8 MB PCI/AGP)
  - Blade3D Turbo 9880T - 135Mhz clockspeed, up from 110 MHz on the Blade 3D vanilla.
  - Blade T16 9950 - Memory; 16MiB at 143 MHz
  - Blade T64 9970 - dual-pixel quad-texture engine, AGP4X, 32 MB of memory, 64-bit datapath
  - Blade XP 9980 - same as T64 except 128-bit datapath, 200 MHz vs. 166 MHz
- XP series (DirectX 8/9)
  - XP4
  - XP4E - AGP8x support.
  - XP8 (cancelled) - DirectX 9 chip, marketed for under US$100.
  - XP10 (cancelled) - PCI Express interface

=== Mobile ===
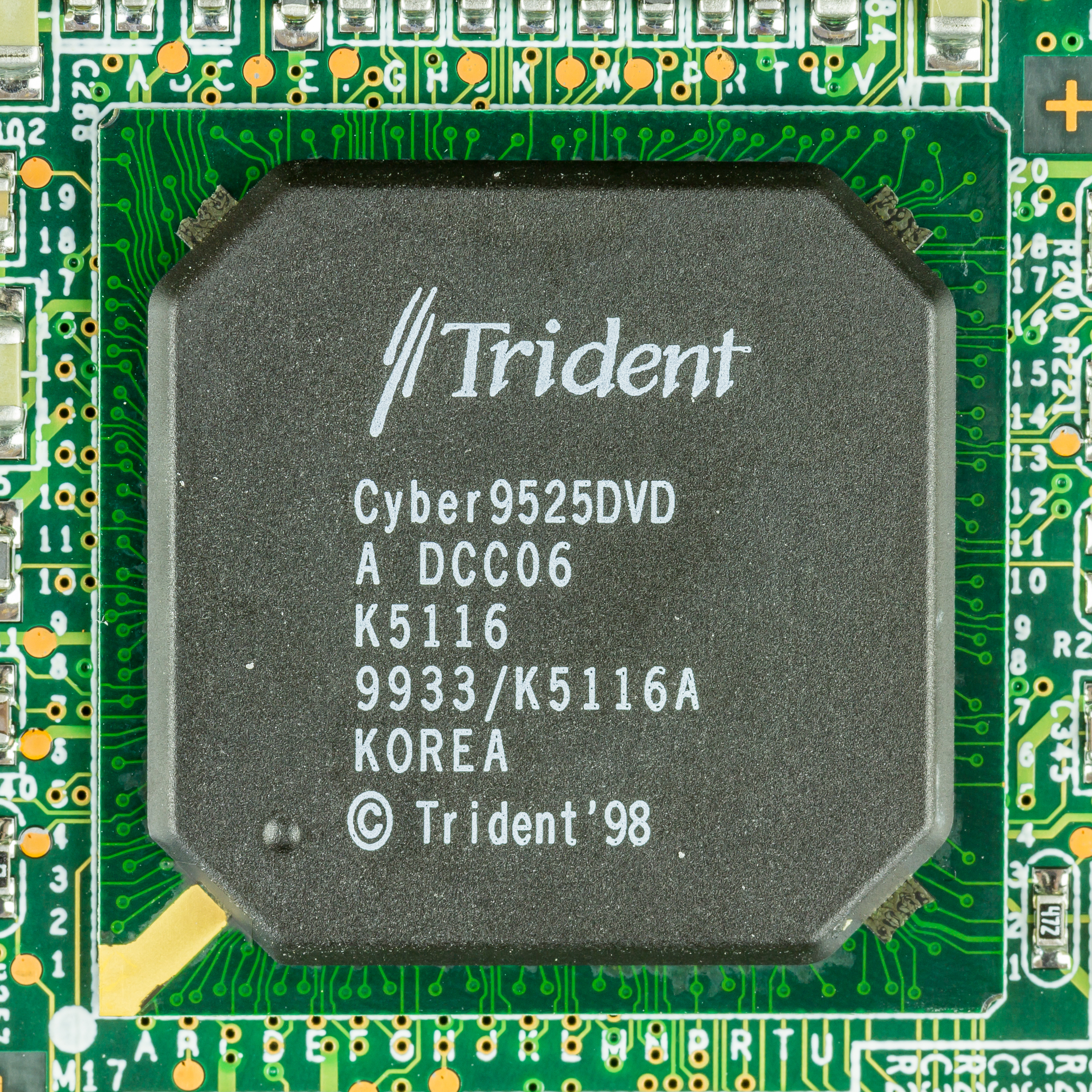
Cyber 9525DVD from laptop - Lifetec LT9303

- Cyber 9xxx
  - Cyber9320
  - Cyber9382
  - Cyber9385
  - Cyber9388
  - Cyber9395
  - Cyber9397 and Cyber9397DVD
  - Cyber9520
  - Cyber9525DVD
- CyberBlade
  - CyberBlade Ai1
  - CyberBlade e4-128
  - CyberBlade i1
  - CyberBlade i7
- CyberBlade XP (9900)
- XP4
  - XP4m16/XP4m32 - embedded memory.
- XP8 (cancelled) - DirectX 9 chip.

=== Integrated with motherboard chipset ===
- ALi CyberALADDiN-T ()
- ALi CyberALADDiN-P4 (CyberBLADE XP2)
- VIA Apollo MVP4 (Blade3D)
- ? (codename Napa2T)
- ? (codename Napa2-P4)
- ? (codename Napa2-Banias)

== Sound chipsets ==
- Trident 4DWAVE-DX/NX, based on the T² platform which is also used by SIS and ALi for their own audio interfaces. Supports Q3D 2.0.

== Digital television chips ==
The SVP-EX product family (described as Trident's fifth-generation video technology) was introduced in 2004 and ramped to significant volume in 2005 as top-tier OEMs Sony and Samsung widely adopted the chip in their new LCD TV models during a time when LCD TV demand grew significantly. It offered advantages in image quality and chip integration compared to competitive solutions, featuring ten-bit color component precision in ADCs, color decoder, deinterlacer, scaler, color processor (image enhancement) and display interface, and a single unified framebuffer.

The SVP-PX (described as featuring Trident's sixth-generation video technology) was the successor of the SVP-EX, featuring an integrated HDMI interface and contributed more than 50% of the company's revenue by Q2 2006.

The SVP-LX (with sixth-generation video technology) was Trident's first chip to support Full HD for high-end televisions.

The SVP-CX (sixth-generation) was a cost-reduced version of the SVP-PX for lower-end LCD TVs with a resolution up to 1366x768p. It was widely adopted by Philips.

The SVP-UX and SVP-WX integrated Trident's first-generation motion compensation/motion estimation technology.

The HiDTV platform, which had a long development history, was Trident's first generation fully integrated DTV SoC integrating MPEG2 decoding, transport stream demultiplexer, and descrambler with the video processor functionality of earlier products. The HiDTV Pro platform was Trident's second-generation integrated DTV SoC platform, with several variants integrating different Trident video processors. Both HiDTV product lines suffered from delays and slow adoption and it was only after the acquisition of Micronas product lines that it was able to win a significant SoC design win at a major OEM for production in 2010.

After the Micronas and NXP acquisitions in 2009, Trident acquired a diverse range of chip products for applications ranging from digital TVs to various types of set-top box, including the FRC (motion-estimation/compensation) chip family from Micronas that was widely used in high-end televisions. At this point Trident possessed a fragmented, overlapping portfolio of products and technology resulting from long-term independent development efforts (stemming from NXP, Micronas and Trident itself), with several architecturally distinct solutions targeting the same application (such as ME/MC chip, DTV video processor and integrated DTV SoC).
