= ThinkPad UltraBay =

Swappable drive bay

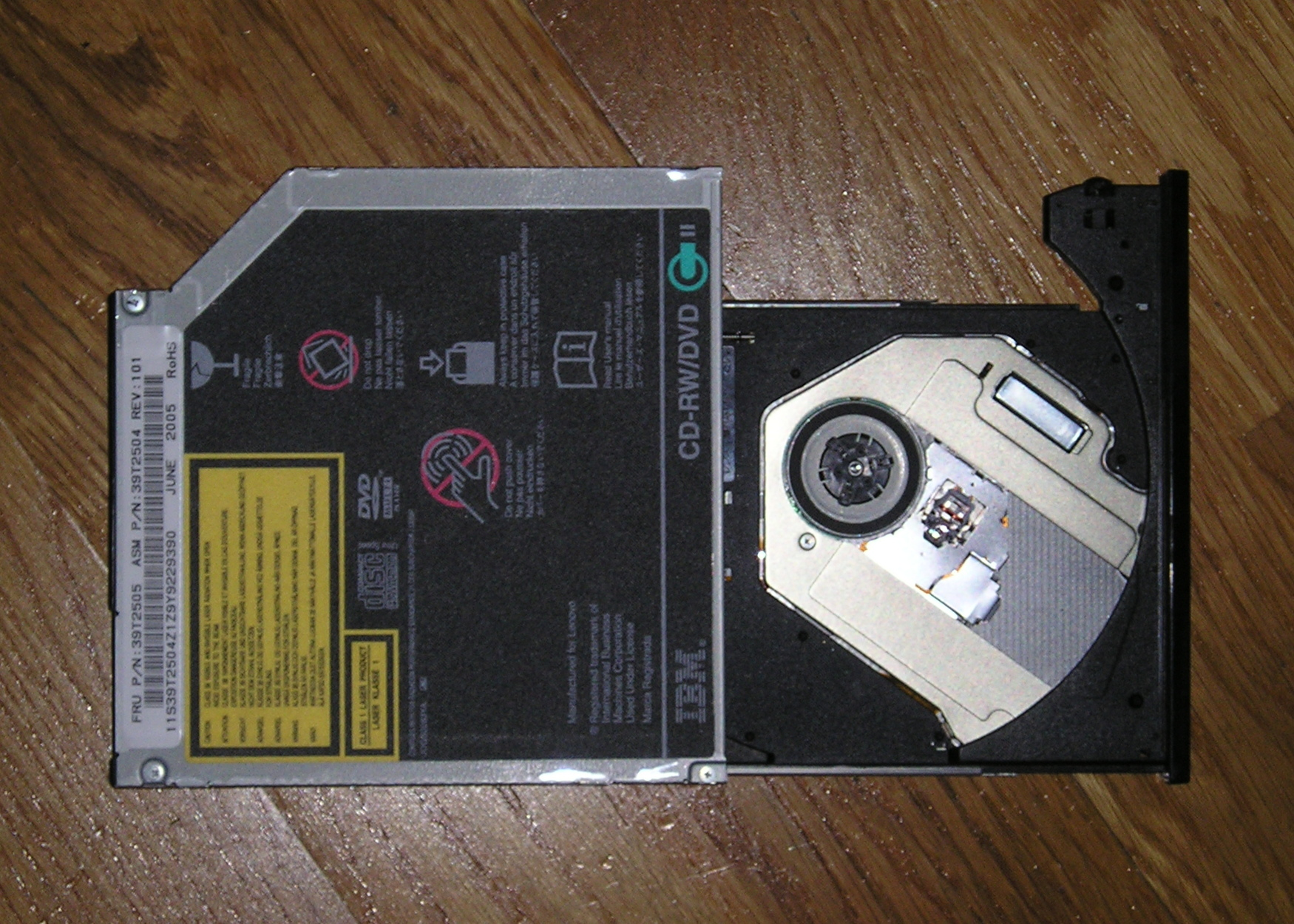
UltraBay Slim with DVD drive

UltraBay is originally IBM's name for the swappable drive bay in the ThinkPad range of laptop computers. When the ThinkPad product line was sold to Lenovo, the concept and the name stayed. It is also used in some of Lenovo's own IdeaPad Y Series laptops and B Series laptops.

Introduced with the ThinkPad 750 series in 1995, this technology has gone through redesigns with almost every new generation of ThinkPad, which may lead to confusion. The following table gives an overview of the different UltraBay types, in which models they occurred and which drives are available for them. The optical drive bay in G series and R40e series ThinkPads is not an UltraBay in that the drives are fixed and not removable. It is however, mechanically, an UltraBay 2000-device without the surrounding "caddy".

On the media side different UltraBays relate to the form factor of the drives they accept; Some machines can accept UltraBay devices up to 12.5 mm thick, whereas others are limited to devices no more than 9.5mm thick.

The IdeaPad Y400 and Y500 laptops have an UltraBay slot which can be swapped for another hard drive, another fan or another Nvidia GT650M (or GT750M) GPU which will work in SLI with the system's primary video card for increased graphics performance. Existing orders for the UltraBay Y500 DVD Burner (no built in optical drive) were cancelled in early June, 2013.

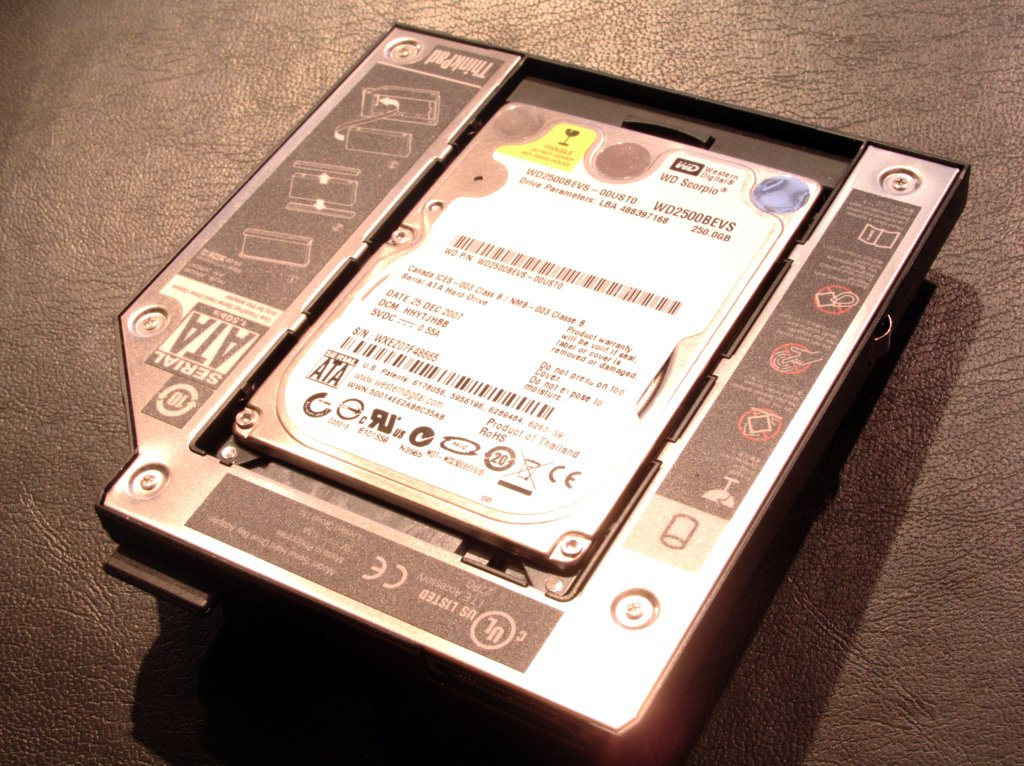
Ultrabay with HDD

Starting in 2014, Lenovo changed the design of the ThinkPad bay adapter and dropped the "UltraBay" terminology from use. What remained (in the ThinkPad W540 product) was an option for a removable Serial ATA (SATA) "Caddy" accessory which, with a screw driver, allowed the optical drive to be replaced with a second 2.5 inch SATA storage device. Battery expansion in the caddy bay was no longer offered, and earlier hot-swap functionality was essentially rendered difficult if not impossible.

== Nomenclature ==
UltraBay
UltraBay type	Featured in					Available devices
UltraBay	355, 360, 370C, 750, 755C, 755CE, 755Cs, 755CSE, 755CV, 755CX, 760C, 760L, 760E					HDD, FDD, Battery, PCMCIA-cartridge, IBM Wireless Modem.
UltraBay Thick	755CD, 755CDV, 760CD, 760E, 760ED, 760EL, 760ELD, 760LD, 760XD, 760XL, 765				SelectaDock I, SelectaDock II	HDD, FDD, CD, Battery, PCMCIA-cartridge, IBM Wireless Modem.
UltraBay II	770				SelectaDock III	HDD, FDD, ZIP-100, ZIP-250, CD, DVD, Battery
UltraBay FX	390, i-Series 1720, i-Series 1721					HDD, FDD, CD, DVD, Battery
UltraSlimbay		600			Ultrabase (570), Portable Drive Bay	HDD, FDD, ZIP-100, ZIP-250, CD, DVD, Battery
UltraBay 2000		T20, T21, T22, T23		A20, A21, A22, A30, (Note: left-sided) A31	Dock 2631, Dock II, UltraBase X2, Portable Drive Bay 2000	HDD, FDD, LS-120, LS-240, ZIP-100, ZIP-250, CD, CD-RW, DVD, Combo, Multi, Battery
UltraBay Plus	R30, R31, R32, R40	T23, T30		A30, A31	Ultrabase X3	HDD, FDD, LS-120, LS-240, ZIP-100, ZIP-250, CD, CD-RW, DVD, Combo, Multi, Battery, PDA-Cradle, NumPad.
UltraBay Slim (Note: IDE interface)		T40, T41, T42, T43, T60, T61; T40p, T41p, T42p, T43p, T60p, T61p	Z60t, Z61t		ThinkPad X4 Dock, UltraBase X4, UltraBase X6, UltraBase X6 Tablet	HDD, DVD, Combo, Multi, Battery, Serial-Parallel Port Adapter (T60–61, some R60–R61).
UltraBay Enhanced	R50, R51, R52, R60, R61		Z60m, Z61m, Z60p, Z61p		ThinkPad Advanced Dock	HDD, DVD, Combo, Multi, BD-RW, Battery
Serial UltraBay Slim (Note: SATA interface, Serial UltraBay Enhanced is not compatible with batteries)		T500, T400, T400s, T410, T410s, T420s, T430s		W500	X200 UltraBase, X220 Ultrabase	HDD, DVD, Combo, Multi, BD-RW, Battery (UltraBay Slim-Battery).
Serial UltraBay Enhanced	R400, R500	T510/T510i, T520, T420, T530, T430		W700, W510, W520, W530		HDD, DVD, Combo, Multi, BD-RW (3mm gap visible).
Fixed Serial UltraBay Enhanced	L510, L410, SL510, SL410, L512, L412, L520, L420, L530, L430					DVD, Combo, Multi, Travel Cover, HDD (with UltraBay-Adapter for Third-party source).
Fixed Serial UltraBay Slim	L440, L540	T440p, T540p		W540, W541; P70, P71, P72		HDD, DVD, Combo, Multi, Travel Cover.

== See also ==
- Disk enclosure
- Caddy (hardware)
