= ThinkPad Z60 =

Computer model by Lenovo

- Manufacturer: Lenovo
- Type: Laptop
- Media: SD, MMC, MS
- Operating system: Windows XP
- CPU: Intel Pentium M - various models
- Display: 15.4" 16:10 TFT TN LCD
- Input: Keyboard, TrackPoint, Fingerprint Reader
- Connectivity: WiFi, Bluetooth, Verizon WWAN
- Power: Battery

The ThinkPad Z60 is the second model in the Lenovo ThinkPad Z series which, as of May 2006, consisted of the 14.1" Z60t and 15.4" Z60m. Announced September 2005, these models were the first ThinkPads to feature a widescreen (16:10) aspect ratio.

All Z60 devices have integrated WiFi connectivity, a magnesium alloy frame, and numerous other ThinkVantage Technologies. Some Z60m devices feature integrated fingerprint reader and bluetooth connectivity. A special edition included a brushed titanium cover.

The laptops provide both PCMCIA and ExpressCard ports. Models that had in-built WWAN had optional connectivity provided by Verizon Wireless and their Evolution-Data Optimized service in the USA.

== Specifications ==
Sources:

- Operating System: Windows XP Home SP2 or Windows XP Professional SP2
- RAM: ECC 256MB, 512MB, 1GB DDR2 SO-DIMM, with support for up to 2GB
- Storage: 5400 RPM SATA Hard Disk in 40GB, 60GB, 80GB, or 100GB
- Processor: Intel Pentium M 740, 750, 760 or Intel Celeron M 360J, 370 (Dothan)
- Chipset: Intel 915PM
- Screen: 16:10 WXGA (1280x800) or WSXGA+ (1680×1050) resolution color TFT
- Video: ATI Radeon X300 (64MB dedicated video memory), X600 GPU (128MB dedicated) or Intel GMA900 (224MB shared video memory)
  - The ATI graphics cards can also use a portion of system RAM as additional video memory.

== Battery recalls ==
Lenovo and IBM recalled some 526 000 batteries across several ThinkPad series, including the Z60m, on 28 September 2006 after a battery caught on fire at Los Angeles International Airport. Lenovo recalled another 205 000 9-cell batteries across the ThinkPad line on 1 March 2007 due to the batteries potentially overheating after they get hit.
