= G41 =

G41, G-41 or G.41 may refer to:

Military references

- Gewehr 41, a German rifle used in World War II
- Heckler & Koch G41, a German assault rifle
- HMS Panther (G41), a United Kingdom Royal Navy destroyer which saw service during World War II
- SMS G41, an Imperial German Navy torpedo boat

Commercial products

- Victorian Railways G class locomotive number
- IBM ThinkPad G41, a model of the G-series ThinkPads, which were used as desktop replacements
- Intel G41 chipset for desktop computers
