= TVSU =

TVSU may refer to:

- Union Island Airport (ICAO code), an airport in Saint Vincent and the Grenadines
- ThinkVantage System Update, one of the ThinkVantage Technologies software utilities
