= G40 =

G40, G-40 or G.40 may refer to:

== Transportation ==
- G40 Shanghai–Xi'an Expressway in China
- a model of the Volkswagen Polo automobile

== Military ==
- Gloster E.28/39, also known as the Gloster G.40, a United Kingdom jet developed during World War II
- SMS G40, an Imperial German Navy torpedo boat

== Other ==
- Generation 40, a Zimbabwean political faction in ZANU-PF supporting Grace Mugabe, the wife of Robert Mugabe
- IBM ThinkPad G40, a laptop computer
