= ThinkPad A series =

Line of midrange to high end desktop replacements

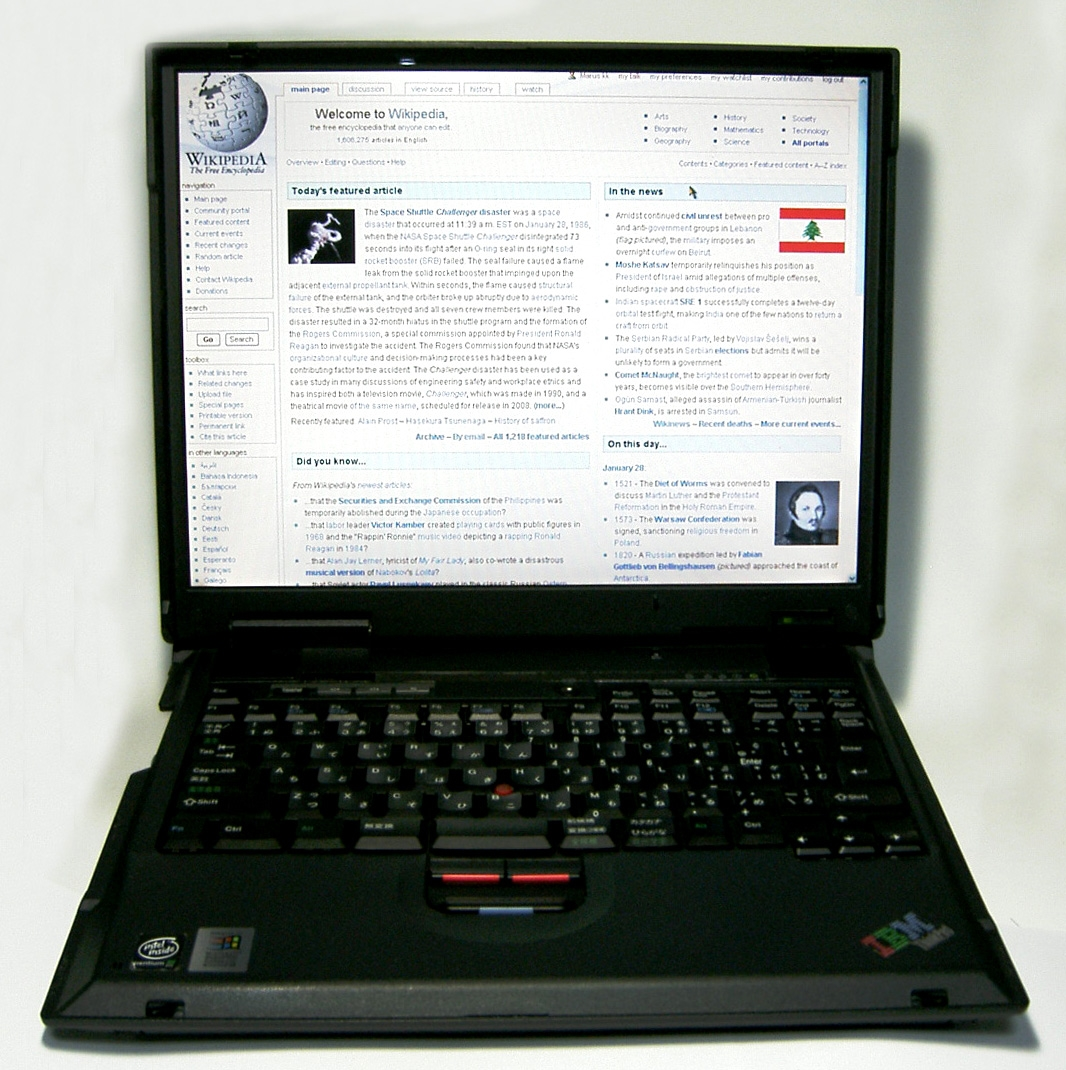
- ThinkPad A21m
- Developer: IBM (2000–2004)
- Type: Desktop replacement
- Released: May 2000; 26 years ago
- Discontinued: January 2004; 22 years ago
- Operating system: Microsoft Windows, Caldera OpenLinux
- Predecessor: ThinkPad 700 series, ThinkPad 300 series
- Successor: ThinkPad G series, ThinkPad R series
- Related: ThinkPad T series, ThinkPad i series

The ThinkPad A series was a short lived line of mid to high end desktop replacements released from May 2000 to March 2002 by IBM as a successor to the ThinkPad 700 series, combining features present in the ThinkPad 300 series. It was discontinued in January 2004 in favor of R and G series ThinkPads. This is not to be confused with the newer ThinkPad A series released by Lenovo consisting of ThinkPad T and X series models with AMD processors.

== History ==
The ThinkPad A series was released as part of IBM's initiative in 2000 to revamp and streamline their lineup of computers. Following decreasing sales in their PC division, a decline that started from following a high of $1 billion in 1998 and lead to $550 million in lost revenues starting the first quarter of 2000, IBM invested more into the ThinkPad line, leading to increased sales in the corporate market. The ThinkPad A series with the A20m and A20p were released to acclaim alongside the ThinkPad T series as its powerful, larger sibling. Being described as "a stellar choice for small or large businesses" that "trades portability for power" by CNET in 2002 while reviewing the A3x series. It offered little compromise when compared to the T series both in the case construction, boasting titanium composite lids, (Note: This was only present in Axxp models) and in the keyboard, offering sturdy and responsive keyboards with 2.7mm of travel, being rated as "a cut above anything you'll find elsewhere, except on some Dell notebooks" by CNET in the same review. The A20m was also one of the first laptops to offer a Intel Celerons in a 15" form factor, leading to 15" displays being more accessible than before.

=== IBM's Improvements ===
IBM's revamps were focused on improving wireless connectivity and user experience. Their wireless connectivity improvements lead to the addition of optional wireless LAN that connected to the mPCI slot and Bluetooth that connected through the UltraPort, a modified USB port that could expand a ThinkPad's functions by adding features such as a CompactFlash slot or a webcam. To give users things to do on the internet, IBM hosted online demonstrations, tips, and forums to provide user help and share experiences. To improve user experience, IBM added the ThinkLight, dedicated volume buttons, and ThinkPad button (later the ThinkVantage button).

To streamline the ThinkPad lineup, IBM replaced their previous ambiguous 300, 500, 600, and 700 series lineups with the better defined A, T, and X series, while keeping their i series around as their ultra-budget line. Naming wise, their streamlining involved the shift from a three number scheme to a system with a letter followed by two numbers. Whereas the previous naming system had a number in front to denote the series a product belonged to followed by a number indicating generation and a third number distinguishing revisions, the new scheme changed the first number into a letter that served the same function. Just like the previous naming scheme, letter suffixes can be added to the end of the model number to signify types of the model it is attached to.

=== Unique features ===
The A series wasn't simply a larger version of the T series. The A series, positioned as a desktop replacement, offered many additional features not available on the T series including a line-in audio jack, 4-pin FireWire, floppy drive, (Note: Only for A2xm and A2xp models, not for A2xe), more powerful GPU options, and options for larger and higher resolution screens. The A3x generation expanded on the list of unique features by adding a second UltraBay in place of the floppy drive, web navigation keys on the left of the keyboard, and option for IPS displays. Those "flexview" IPS screens, with drastically greater viewing angles, were also added as an option for future T, R, and X series ThinkPads, leading to ThinkPads of this era being known for their great displays.

IBM ThinkPad A series 2000–2004
Case	Screen	Type	A2x			A3x	
14"	12.1"	Low Cost	A20m	A21e		Replaced by ThinkPad R series	
14"	12.1"	Low Cost	A20m	A21m	A22m	Replaced by ThinkPad R series	
14"	13.3"	Low Cost		A21e	A22e	Replaced by ThinkPad R series	
14"	14.1"	Low Cost		A21e	A22e	Replaced by ThinkPad R series	
14"	14.1"	Mainstream	A20m	A21m	A22m	Replaced by ThinkPad R series	
15"	14.1"	Low Cost				A30	A31
15"	15"	Low Cost	A20m	A21e			
15"	15"	Mainstream	A20m	A21m	A22m	A30	A31
15"	15"	Performance	A20p	A21p	A22p	A30p	A31p

== A2x (2000-2001) ==
ThinkPad A20 series
- Manufacturer: IBM
- Released: May 2000
- Discontinued: 2002
- CPU: Intel Pentium III or Celeron
- Memory: 64–128 MB SDRAM (PC100)
- Made in: Mexico: Guadalajara, Jalisco (Guadalajara Plant); United States: Research Triangle Park, North Carolina (RTP Plant; low-volume production only); Japan: Fujisawa, Kanagawa (Fujisawa Plant); United Kingdom: Greenock, Scotland (Greenock Plant); China: Shenzhen, Guangdong (IIPC)

All ThinkPad A series information reference the tawbook.

=== A20m ===
The ThinkPad A20m was released in 2000 as a successor to the ThinkPad 770. It was released alongside the A20p and was meant to be both the lower cost and mainstream option of the A series. A carbon fiber case similar to the one in the ThinkPad 240 and 600 series was used to maintain stiffness while keeping the laptop somewhat light.

It came in two body types with 3 display sizes. The 14" body type could be fitted with either a 12.1" SVGA (800x600) or a 14.1" XGA (1024x768) display. The 15" body type could only be optioned with a 15" XGA (1024x768) display.

=== A20p ===
The ThinkPad A20p was released as the high end version of the A20m. It sported a titanium composite lid similar to the T20 released around the same time, higher capacity battery, UltraPort, higher resolution displays, and more performant CPUs and GPUs when compared to the A20m.

The A20p was only available in the 15" body type with a 15" SXGA+ (1400x1050) display.

=== A21e ===
The ThinkPad A21e was released starting at $1499 and was aimed at "budget-conscious business users".

It had features cut out, including the ability to dock to the full sized ThinkPad Dock, was made of ABS plastic, had a lower end 440MX chipset that couldn't handle as much RAM, did not have battery terminals nor the ability to hot or warm swap in the UltraBay, and couldn't support more than one PCMCIA card at a time.

During the A21e's lifetime, two versions of it were released. One, released in October 2000, was based on the A21m. The other was a smaller model released in March 2001 and didn't have a 1.44MB floppy drive or upgradeable CPUs. This was the model that the A22e would revise on.

In Japan only, there were versions both types of A21e released called the ThinkPad i Series 1800. These were essentially the same computers but rebranded under the i Series name.

The A21m based model was available in two both 14" and 15" body types. The 14" body type housed either a 12.1" SVGA (800x600) or a 14.1" (Note: Only the i series 1800 based on this model was available in 14.1") XGA (1024x768) display. The 15" body type was only available with a 15" XGA (1024x768) display.

The newer, smaller model was only offered in the 14" body type which could be optioned with 12.1", 13.3", or 14.1" displays. the 12" display was SVGA (800x600) while the 13" and 14" displays were XGA (1024x768).

=== A21m ===
The ThinkPad A21m was released in September 2000 as a revision of the A20m with faster CPUs.

It came in two body types with 3 display sizes. The 14" body type could be fitted with either a 12.1" SVGA (800x600) or a 14.1" XGA (1024x768) display. The 15" body type could only be optioned with a 15" XGA (1024x768) display.

=== A21p ===
The ThinkPad A21p was released as a revision of the A20p with faster CPUs and higher resolution displays. PCWorld gave the A21p a score of 89, rating it the best "Power Notebook" due to its chart topping performance. In the main review of the laptop, they noted its high resolution screen and high-speed mobile Pentium III processor, calling it the "Lexus of portables".

The A21p was only available in the 15" body type with a 15" UXGA (1600x1200) display.

=== A22e ===
The ThinkPad A22e was released in June 2001 and was a revision on the smaller version of the A21e. A new version of i series 1800 was released based on the A22e as well. This would be the last A series with an -e suffix as the ThinkPad R series succeeded it in the space of low cost smaller laptops.

The A22e was only offered in the 14" body type which could either house a 13.3" or a 14.1" XGA (1024x768) display.

=== A22m ===
The ThinkPad A22m was released as a revision of the A21m with faster CPUs. While other A series models supported wireless LAN as upgrades, it was the first A series model to have the option of wireless LAN connectivity from the factory. It was given the Editor's Choice Award from ZDNet in 2001 and was the best rated out of the 7 other "AV notebooks" reviewed, being fast with excellent build quality. Starting with the A3x series, the smaller 14" body type from the mainstream Axxm linup of desktop replacements would be succeeded by the R series.

It came in two body types with 3 display sizes. The 14" body type could be fitted with either a 12.1" SVGA (800x600) or a 14.1" XGA (1024x768) display. The 15" body type could only be optioned with a 15" XGA (1024x768) display.

=== A22p ===
The ThinkPad A22p was released as a revision of the A21p with faster CPUs. In a review in 2001, Bloomberg called it the Lexus among portables due to it "[teaming] great design with top-shelf components, as well as a screen resolution of 1600 by 1200, the highest available for notebooks".

The A22p was only available in the 15" body type with a 15" UXGA (1600x1200) display.

== A3x (2001-2004) ==
ThinkPad A30 series
- Manufacturer: IBM
- Released: October 2001
- Discontinued: January 2004
- CPU: Intel Pentium III (A30); Intel Pentium 4-M (A31)
- Memory: 128–256 MB SDRAM (PC133)
- Made in: Mexico: Guadalajara, Jalisco (Guadalajara Plant); United States: Research Triangle Park, North Carolina (RTP Plant; low-volume production only); Japan: Fujisawa, Kanagawa (Fujisawa Plant); United Kingdom: Greenock, Scotland (Greenock Plant); China: Shenzhen, Guangdong (IIPC)

All ThinkPad A series information reference the tawbook.

=== A30 ===
The ThinkPad A30 was released in October 2001 alongside the ThinkPad R Series, the laptop line that replaced the lower cost lines of the A series. This was reflected in the positioning of the A series in IBM's lineup shifting from "Desktop alternatives covering a range of performance and functionalities" to "High-performance desktop alternatives with exceptional versatility".

It, along with the ThinkPad R30 released at the same time, started the era of ThinkPad design of a cut corner on the left side back side, thin, exposed metal hinges, grey function row and page left and right keys, and a blue enter key. This design was later brought to the T30 and the X3x series in 2002. While the cut corner and the grey color accents would only last in ThinkPad design until 2005, the exposed metal hinges along with the blue enter key and the page left/right keys would stay with ThinkPads for much longer. The changes to the A series were not all positive though. In place of the carbon fiber construction of the Axxm series, ABS plastic lids and glass fiber reinforced plastic bottoms were used instead on the A30.

Being a desktop replacement, the laptop featured not just one but two UltraBays, One Ultrabay 2000 on the left side and another Ultrabay Plus on the right. The Ultrabay Plus (Note: This Ultrabay does not have battery terminals) could be used for floppy, SuperDisk, ZIP, CD, or DVD drives just like an Ultrabay 2000, or for expanding other device functions such as adding a numpad or a cradle for the IBM WorkPad PDA. Not only were there two UltraBays, there were two Communication Daughter Card slots that could house either 56K modem or 10/100 Ethernet cards. It also included six web navigation keys on the left side of the keyboard, three of which were preprogramed while the other three were user programmable.

The A30 was available with 3 display options: a 14.1" XGA (1024x768), a 15.0" XGA (1024x768), or a 15.0" SXGA+ (1400x1050), all of which were TN displays.

=== A30p ===
The ThinkPad A30p was the performance version of the A30, released at the same time. Based on the same chassis, the differences are mostly internal, with the only exterior differences being the inclusion of the UltraPort. However, the differences internally are drastic, not only is the unit more secure with the IBM Embedded Security Subsystem and more powerful in both processing power and graphics performance, it also features a high resolution, UXGA (1600x1200), IPS display—one of the first on a laptop.

The A30p came only with a UXGA (1600x1200) 15.0" IPS display.

=== A31 ===
The ThinkPad A31 was a revision to the ThinkPad A30 with mobile Pentium 4-M processors, DDR SDRAM, and faster ATI Mobility Radeon 7500 graphics. It was described as having a "knockout feature set" and being a "good choice for users who want a bit of portability without breaking the bank" by PC Magazine in a 2002 review.

The A31 was available with 3 display options: a 14.1" XGA (1024x768), a 15.0" XGA (1024x768), or a 15.0" SXGA+ (1400x1050), all of which were TN displays.

=== A31p ===
The ThinkPad A31p was a revision on the A30p and the performance version of the A31. Described as not just a desktop replacement but a workstation replacement by PCMag in 2002, it was updated with the ATI Mobility FireGL 7800, Pentium 4-M processors, and DDR SDRAM. Continuing to use IPS display technology, the A31p's screen was described to "remain crisp even to viewers sitting at extreme angles."

The ThinkPad A31p was the successor to the 760XD in the International Space Station. They were sent to the ISS starting in 2003 and stayed in use for six years until 2009 when the ThinkPad T61p replaced it.

The A31p came only with a UXGA (1600x1200) 15.0" IPS display.

==== A31p in Space ====
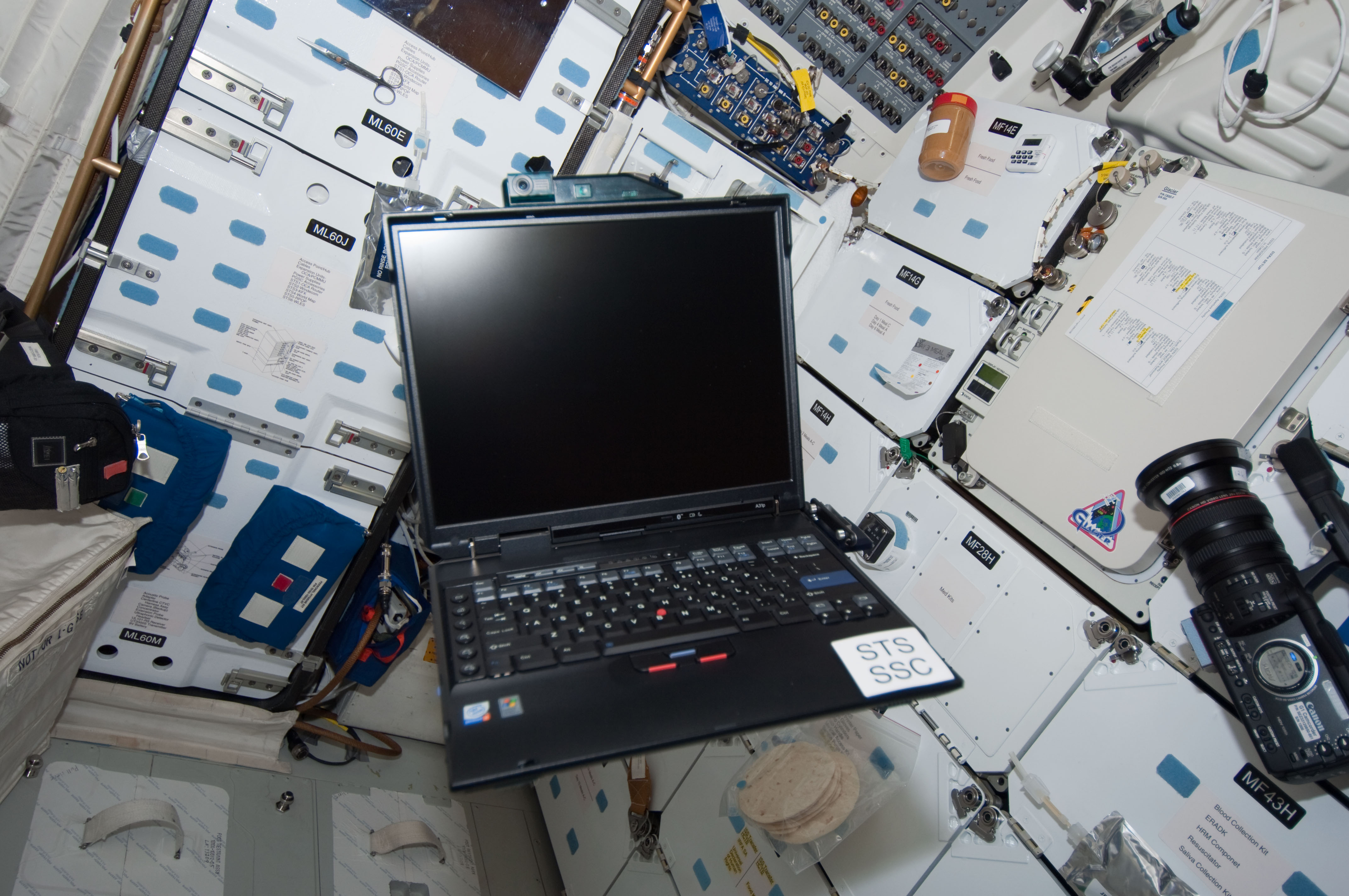
View of the ThinkPad A31p on the Middeck (MDDK) of the orbiter Endeavour during the STS-126 mission

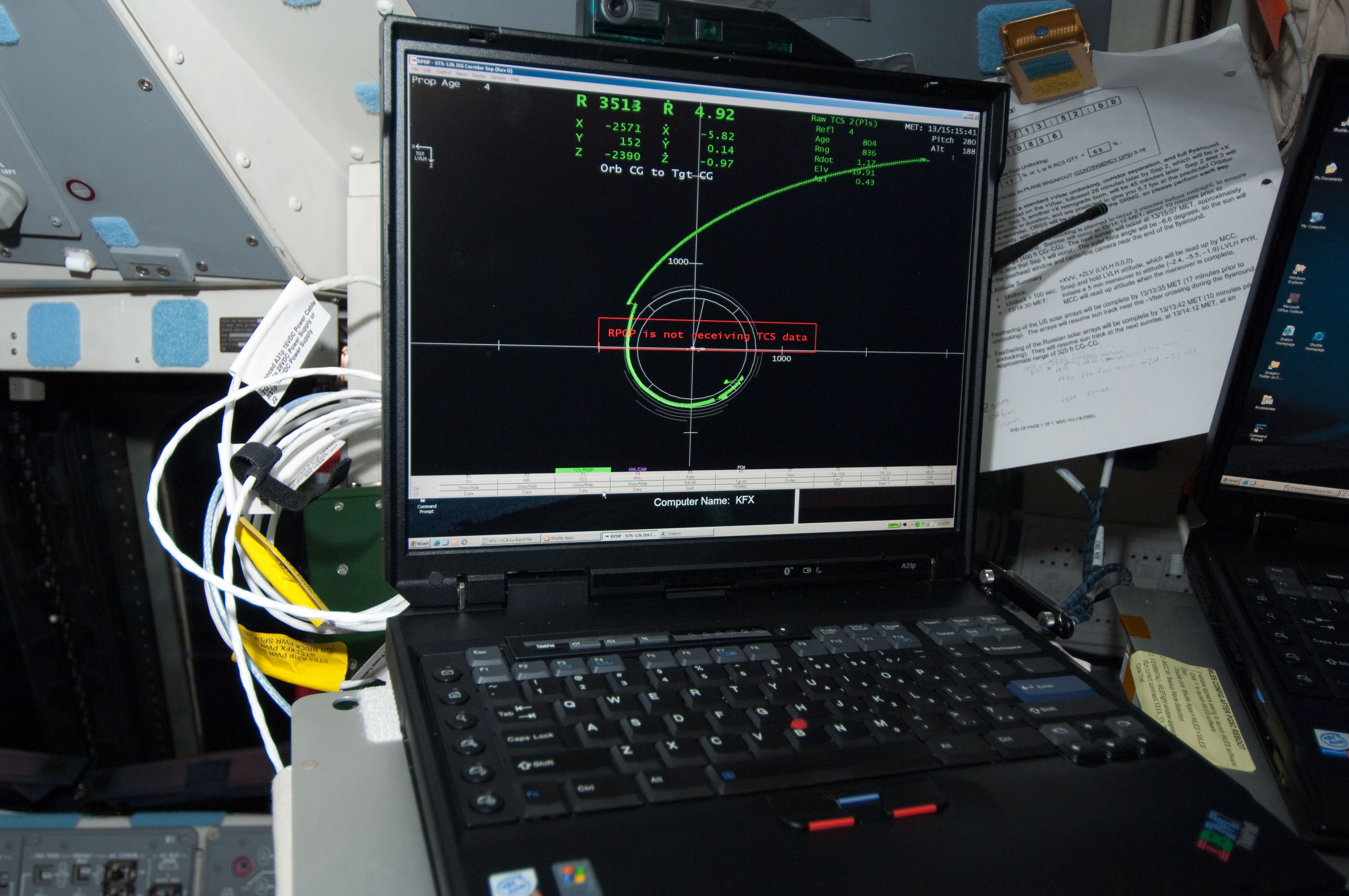
View of data on a Thinkpad A31p as used by the STS-126 crew during separation from the International Space Station (ISS)

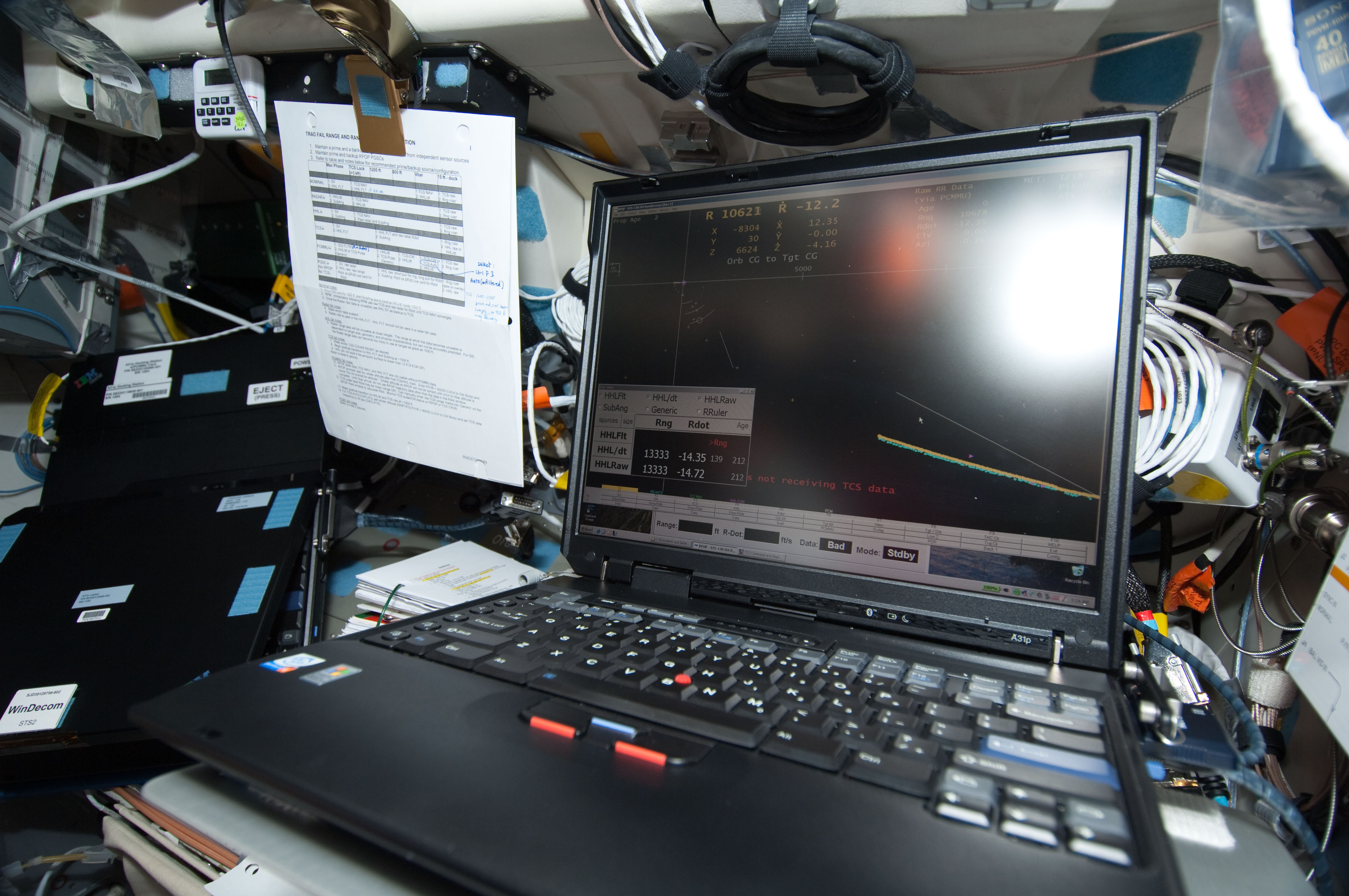
View of a Thinkpad A31p on the aft flight deck (FD) of the orbiter Endeavour during Flight Day 3 (FD3) rendezvous operations (OPS)

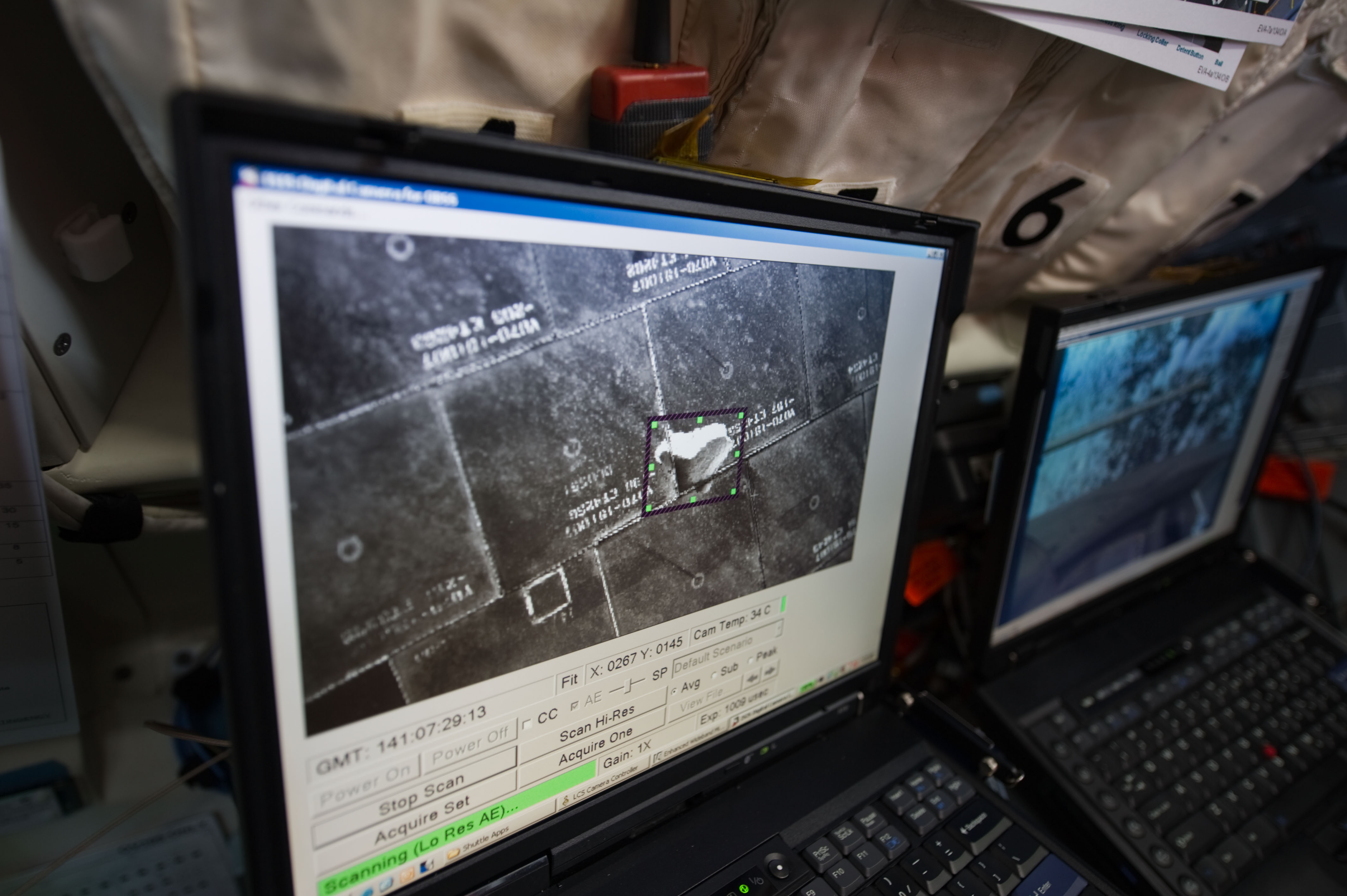
View of two A31p's on the shuttle Endeavour aft Flight Deck. The shuttle Thermal Protection System (TPS) tiles are visible on the screen. Photo taken during a focused inspection of the TPS tiles.

== Specifications ==
All ThinkPad A series specifications reference the tawbook.

Battery configuration

Main	M(x)	Main hot-swappable (max.cells)	Secondary	U	Ultrabay removable
Main	M(x)	Main hot-swappable (max.cells)	Secondary	u	Ultrabay unremovable
Main	M(x)	Main removable (max.cells)	Secondary	m(x)	internal (max.cells) "PowerBridge"
Main	m(x)	Main internal (max.cells)	Secondary	S	Slice battery

Laptop color codes

Processor

Socketed desktop processor
Socketed mobile processor
Soldered high power processor
Soldered standard power processor
Soldered low power processor
Soldered ultra low power processor

Weight

0.9 kg (2.0 lb)	Up to 0.91 kg
1.0 kg (2.2 lb)	0.92–1.0 kg
1.1 kg (2.4 lb)	1.01–1.1 kg
1.2 kg (2.6 lb)	1.11–1.2 kg
1.3 kg (2.9 lb)	1.21–1.3 kg
1.4 kg (3.1 lb)	1.31–1.4 kg
1.5 kg (3.3 lb)	1.41–1.5 kg
1.6 kg (3.5 lb)	1.51–1.6 kg
1.7 kg (3.7 lb)	1.61–1.7 kg
1.8 kg (4.0 lb)	1.71–1.81 kg
1.9 kg (4.2 lb)	1.81–1.91 kg
2.0 kg (4.4 lb)	1.91–2.03 kg
2.1 kg (4.6 lb)	2.04–2.14 kg
2.3 kg (5.1 lb)	2.15–2.4 kg
2.5 kg (5.5 lb)	2.41–2.75 kg
2.8 kg (6.2 lb)	2.76–3.05 kg
3.1 kg (6.8 lb)	3.06–3.42 kg
3.5 kg (7.7 lb)	3.43–3.99 kg
4.0 kg (8.8 lb)	4.0–4.99 kg
5.5 kg (12 lb)	5.0–6.49 kg
7.2 kg (16 lb)	6.5–7.99 kg
9.1 kg (20 lb)	8.0–9.99 kg
10.7 kg (24 lb)	10–11.99 kg
12.7 kg (28 lb)	12–14.49 kg
14.5 kg (32 lb)	14.5–17.99 kg
18.1 kg (40 lb)	18–20.99 kg
21.7 kg (48 lb)	21–23.99 kg
24 kg (53 lb)	24–28.99 kg
29.5 kg (65 lb)	29 kg and above

Screen resolution

4K or higher
1440p+ (WQHD, QXGA)
1080p+ (Full HD, UXGA)
Better than 768p (SXGA,SXGA+)
600p+ (SVGA, HD, XGA, HD+)
Up to 600p (VGA)

Graphics

Dual standard socket graphics option
Dual proprietary socket graphics option
Standard socket graphics option
Proprietary socket graphics option
Soldered performance graphics option
Soldered midrange graphics option
Soldered mainstream graphics option
Soldered entry graphics option
Integrated entry graphics
Integrated basic graphics

Laptop storage combinations (excluding WWAN slot)

Level	PCIe 4.0 x4	PCIe 3.0 x4	PCIe 3.0 x2	M.2 SATA	mSATA	1.8" SATA	2.5" SATA	1.8" IDE	2.5" IDE
	2019; Not yet (laptops)	2013	2013	2013	2009	2003	2003	1991	1988
	3						2		
	4								
	3						1		
	2						2		
	3					2			
	3								
	2						1		
	4								
	3					1			
	2					2			
	2								
	1						1		
	3								
	2					1			
	1								
	2								
	1					1			
			2				1		
							4		
		1							
			1				1		
							3		
			1						
				1			1		
					1		1		
						1	1		
							2		
									3
						1			
							1		
									2
								1	
									1

Laptop memory

Amount	LPDDR5X	LPDDR5	DDR5	LPDDR4X	LPDDR4	DDR4	LPDDR3	DDR4	DDR3L		DDR3		DDR2		DDR	SDR	EDO	FPM
Amount						dual channel		< dual channel	dual channel	< dual channel	dual channel	< dual channel	dual channel	< dual channel				
Amount	2022 (laptops)	2019 (laptops)	2020	2017	2014	2014	2012	2014	2010		2007		2003		1998	1993	1993	1987
max memory = 512 GB	N/A	N/A	512 GB	N/A	N/A	N/A	N/A	N/A	N/A	N/A	N/A	N/A	N/A	N/A	N/A	N/A	N/A	N/A
max memory = 256 GB	N/A		256 GB (4 slots)	N/A	N/A	N/A	N/A	N/A	N/A	N/A	N/A	N/A	N/A	N/A	N/A	N/A	N/A	N/A
max memory = 128 GB	128 GB		128 GB	N/A	N/A	128 GB (4 slots)	N/A	N/A	N/A	N/A	N/A	N/A	N/A	N/A	N/A	N/A	N/A	N/A
64 GB ≤ max memory < 128 GB		64 GB		N/A	N/A	64 GB	N/A	64 GB (2 slots)	64 GB (4 slots)	N/A	N/A	N/A	N/A	N/A	N/A	N/A	N/A	N/A
32 GB ≤ max memory < 64 GB				32 GB	32 GB	32 GB	N/A		32 GB	32 GB (2 slots)	32 GB (4 slots)	N/A	N/A	N/A	N/A	N/A	N/A	N/A
16 GB ≤ max memory < 32 GB						16 GB	16 GB		16 GB		16 GB	16 GB (2 slots)	16 GB (4 slots)	N/A	N/A	N/A	N/A	N/A
8 GB ≤ max memory < 16 GB						8 GB			8 GB		8 GB		8 GB	8 GB (2 slots)	8 GB (4 slots)	N/A	N/A	N/A
4 GB ≤ max memory < 8 GB						4 GB			4 GB		4 GB		4 GB		4 GB	4 GB (4 slots)	4 GB (4 slots)	N/A
2 GB ≤ max memory < 4 GB						2 GB (8 chips)			2 GB		2 GB		2 GB			2 GB	2 GB	N/A
1 GB ≤ max memory < 2 GB			1 GB (1 chip)	dual channel min	dual channel min	N/A		single channel min	1 GB		1 GB		1 GB					1 GB (4 slots)
512 MB ≤ max memory < 1 GB	N/A	N/A	N/A	single channel min	single channel min	N/A	dual channel min	half channel min	512 MB (8 chips)		512 MB (8 chips)		512 MB					512 MB
256 MB ≤ max memory < 512 MB	N/A	N/A	N/A	256 MB (1 chip)	256 MB (1 chip)	N/A	single channel min	256 MB (1 chip)	N/A	single channel min	N/A	single channel min	256 MB					
128 MB ≤ max memory < 256 MB	N/A	N/A	N/A	N/A	N/A	N/A	128 MB (1 chip)	N/A	N/A	half channel min	N/A	half channel min						
64 MB ≤ max memory < 128 MB	N/A	N/A	N/A	N/A	N/A	N/A	N/A	N/A	N/A	64 MB (1 chip)	N/A	64 MB (1 chip)						
max memory < 64 MB	N/A	N/A	N/A	N/A	N/A	N/A	N/A	N/A	N/A	N/A	N/A	N/A						

=== A2x Specifications ===
Model	Release (US)	Dimensions^{(w, d, h)}	Weight^{(min)}	CPU	Chipset	Memory ^{(max)}	Graphics	Storage	Networking	Audio	Screen	Battery	Other	Operating System
A20m (14")	May 2000	317 x 268 x 43.3mm (12.48 x 10.53 x 1.7")	2.9 kg (6.4 lb)	Intel Mobile Celeron or Pentium III^{(Coppermine)} FSB: 100MT/s	Intel 440BX	512MB^{(2x PC-100 SDR SO-DIMM)}	ATI Rage Mobility M^{(4MB SDRAM, AGP 2X)} or M1^{(8MB SDRAM, AGP 2X)}	One UltraBay 2000, One 2.5" IDE	Lucent 56K modem or Intel 10/100 Ethernet with Xircom1 56K modem or 3Com 10/100 Ethernet with 3Com or Lucent 56K modem^{in Communications Bay}	Crystal Semiconductor CS4624 with CS4297A Intel AC'97 codec 0.5W Stereo speakers Internal microphone	12.1" SVGA(800x600), or 14.1" XGA(1024x768) TN TFT LCD	M(9); U	One White ThinkLight Supports^{ThinkPad Port Replicator; ThinkPad Dock} One 3.5" 1.44MB Floppy drive^{(Unremovable)}	Microsoft Windows 98 Second Edition Windows 2000 Professional Caldera OpenLinux eDesktop 2.4
A20m (15")	May 2000	329 x 268 x 44.7mm (12.95 x 10.53 x 1.76")	3.1 kg (6.8 lb)	Intel Mobile Celeron or Pentium III^{(Coppermine)} FSB: 100MT/s	Intel 440BX	512MB^{(2x PC-100 SDR SO-DIMM)}	ATI Rage Mobility M^{(4MB SDRAM, AGP 2X)} or M1^{(8MB SDRAM, AGP 2X)}	One UltraBay 2000, One 2.5" IDE	Lucent 56K modem or Intel 10/100 Ethernet with Xircom1 56K modem or 3Com 10/100 Ethernet with 3Com or Lucent 56K modem^{in Communications Bay}	Crystal Semiconductor CS4624 with CS4297A Intel AC'97 codec 0.5W Stereo speakers Internal microphone	15.0" XGA(1024x768) TN TFT LCD	M(9); U	One White ThinkLight Supports^{ThinkPad Port Replicator; ThinkPad Dock} One 3.5" 1.44MB Floppy drive^{(Unremovable)}	Microsoft Windows 98 Second Edition Windows 2000 Professional Caldera OpenLinux eDesktop 2.4
A20p	May 2000	329 x 268 x 44.7mm (12.95 x 10.53 x 1.76")	3.45 kg (7.6 lb)	Intel Mobile Pentium III^{(Coppermine)} FSB: 100MT/s	Intel 440BX	512MB^{(2x PC-100 SDR SO-DIMM)}	ATI Rage Mobility 128^{(16MB SDRAM, AGP 2X)}	One UltraBay 2000, One 2.5" IDE	Lucent 56K modem or Intel 10/100 Ethernet with Xircom1 56k modem^{in Communications Bay}	Crystal Semiconductor CS4624 with CS4297A Intel AC'97 codec 0.5W Stereo speakers Internal microphone	15.0" SXGA+(1400x1050) TN TFT LCD	M(9); U	One White ThinkLight Supports^{ThinkPad Port Replicator; ThinkPad Dock} One 3.5" 1.44MB Floppy drive^{(Unremovable)} One UltraPort	Microsoft Windows 98 Second Edition Windows 2000 Professional
A21e (14") (Original)	Oct 2000	317 x 267.5 x 43.3mm (12.48 x 10.53 x 1.7")	3.0 kg (6.6 lb)	Intel Mobile Celeron^{(Coppermine)} FSB: 100MT/s	Intel 440MX	256MB^{(2x PC-100 SDR SO-DIMM)}	ATI Rage Mobility M^{(4MB SDRAM, PCI)}	One UltraBay 2000, (Note: Does not support hot or warm swapping); One 2.5" IDE	Lucent 56K modem or Intel 10/100 Ethernet with Xircom1 56K modem or 3Com 10/100 Ethernet with 3Com or Lucent 56K modem^{in Communications Bay}	Intel 440MX Audio with CS4299 Intel AC'97 codec 0.5W Stereo speakers	12.1" SVGA(800x600), or 14.1" XGA(1024x768) TN TFT LCD	M(9); U	One White ThinkLight Supports^{ThinkPad Port Replicator} One 3.5" 1.44MB Floppy drive^{(Unremovable)}	Microsoft Windows 98 Second Edition Windows 2000 Professional
A21e (15") (Original)	Oct 2000	329 x 268 x 44.7mm (12.95 x 10.53 x 1.76")	3.3 kg (7.3 lb)	Intel Mobile Celeron^{(Coppermine)} FSB: 100MT/s	Intel 440MX	256MB^{(2x PC-100 SDR SO-DIMM)}	ATI Rage Mobility M^{(4MB SDRAM, PCI)}	One UltraBay 2000, One 2.5" IDE	Lucent 56K modem or Intel 10/100 Ethernet with Xircom1 56K modem or 3Com 10/100 Ethernet with 3Com or Lucent 56K modem^{in Communications Bay}	Intel 440MX Audio with CS4299 Intel AC'97 codec 0.5W Stereo speakers	15.0" XGA(1024x768) TN TFT LCD	M(9); U	One White ThinkLight Supports^{ThinkPad Port Replicator} One 3.5" 1.44MB Floppy drive^{(Unremovable)}	Microsoft Windows 98 Second Edition Windows 2000 Professional
A21e (Refresh)	Mar 2001	305 x 254 x 35.6mm (12.0 x 10.4 x 1.4")	2.59 kg (5.7 lb)	Intel Mobile Celeron^{(Coppermine)} FSB: 100MT/s	Intel 440MX	256MB^{(2x PC-100 SDR SO-DIMM)}	ATI Rage Mobility M^{(4MB SDRAM, PCI)}	One UltraBay 2000, One 2.5" IDE	Lucent 56K modem or Intel 10/100 Ethernet with Xircom1 56K modem or 3Com 10/100 Ethernet with 3Com or Lucent 56K modem^{in Communications Bay}	Intel 440MX Audio with CS4299 Intel AC'97 codec 1.5W Mono speakers	12.1" SVGA(800x600), or 13.3" XGA(1024x768) or 14.1" XGA(1024x768) TN TFT LCD	M(6)	One White ThinkLight Supports^{ThinkPad Port Replicator}	Microsoft Windows 98 Second Edition Windows 2000 Professional
A21m (14")	Sep 2000	317 x 267.5 x 43.3mm (12.48 x 10.53 x 1.7")	2.9 kg (6.4 lb)	Intel Mobile Pentium III (Note: Certain models ending in Exx or Dxx do not have upgradeable CPUs)^{(Coppermine)} FSB: 100MT/s	Intel 440BX	512MB^{(2x PC-100 SDR SO-DIMM)}	ATI Rage Mobility M^{(4MB SDRAM, AGP 2X)} or M1^{(8MB SDRAM, AGP 2X)}	One UltraBay 2000, One 2.5" IDE	Lucent 56K modem or Intel 10/100 Ethernet with Xircom1 56K modem or 3Com 10/100 Ethernet with 3Com or Lucent 56K modem^{in Communications Bay}	Crystal Semiconductor CS4624 with CS4297A Intel AC'97 codec 0.5W Stereo speakers Internal microphone	12.1" SVGA(800x600), or 14.1" XGA(1024x768) TN TFT LCD	M(9); U	One White ThinkLight Supports^{ThinkPad Port Replicator; ThinkPad Dock} One 3.5" 1.44MB Floppy drive^{(Unremovable)}	Microsoft Windows 98 Second Edition Windows 2000 Professional Caldera OpenLinux eDesktop 2.4
A21m (15")	Sep 2000	329 x 267.5 x 44.7mm (12.95 x 10.53 x 1.76")	3.1 kg (6.8 lb)	Intel Mobile Pentium III^{(Coppermine)} FSB: 100MT/s	Intel 440BX	512MB^{(2x PC-100 SDR SO-DIMM)}	ATI Rage Mobility M^{(4MB SDRAM, AGP 2X)} or M1^{(8MB SDRAM, AGP 2X)}	One UltraBay 2000, One 2.5" IDE	Lucent 56K modem or Intel 10/100 Ethernet with Xircom1 56K modem or 3Com 10/100 Ethernet with 3Com or Lucent 56K modem^{in Communications Bay}	Crystal Semiconductor CS4624 with CS4297A Intel AC'97 codec 0.5W Stereo speakers Internal microphone	15.0" XGA(1024x768) TN TFT LCD	M(9); U	One White ThinkLight Supports^{ThinkPad Port Replicator; ThinkPad Dock} One 3.5" 1.44MB Floppy drive^{(Unremovable)}	Microsoft Windows 98 Second Edition Windows 2000 Professional Caldera OpenLinux eDesktop 2.4
A21p	Sep 2000	329 x 268 x 44.7mm (12.95 x 10.53 x 1.76")	3.45 kg (7.6 lb)	Intel Mobile Pentium III^{(Coppermine)} FSB: 100MT/s	Intel 440BX	512MB^{(2x PC-100 SDR SO-DIMM)}	ATI Rage Mobility 128^{(16MB SGRAM, AGP 2X)}	One UltraBay 2000, One 2.5" IDE	Lucent 56K modem or Intel 10/100 Ethernet with Xircom1 56K modem or 3Com 10/100 Ethernet with 3Com or Lucent 56K modem^{in Communications Bay}	Crystal Semiconductor CS4624 with CS4297A Intel AC'97 codec 0.5W Stereo speakers Internal microphone	15.0" UXGA(1600x1200) TN TFT LCD	M(9); U	One White ThinkLight Supports^{ThinkPad Port Replicator; ThinkPad Dock} One 3.5" 1.44MB Floppy drive^{(Unremovable)} One UltraPort	Microsoft Windows 98 Second Edition Windows 2000 Professional
A22e	Jun 2001	305 x 254 x 35.6mm (12.0 x 10.4 x 1.4")	2.59 kg (5.7 lb)	Intel Mobile Celeron (Note: Models ending in 45x, 46x, 47x, 48x, 4Ax, 55x, 56x, 57x, 58x, 5Ax, 65x, 66x, 67x, 95x, 96x, 97x, 98x, 9Ax, A5x, A6x, A7x, A8x, AAx, B5x, B6x, B7x, E7x, F7x, M7x, P7J, PAJ have upgradeable CPUs)^{(Coppermine)} FSB: 100MT/s	Intel 440MX	256MB^{(2x PC-100 SDR SO-DIMM)}	ATI Rage Mobility M^{(4MB SDRAM, PCI)}	One UltraBay 2000, One 2.5" IDE	Lucent 56K modem or Intel 10/100 Ethernet with Xircom1 56K modem^{in Communications Bay}	Intel 440MX Audio with CS4299 Intel AC'97 codec 1.5W Mono speakers	13.3" XGA(1024x768) or 14.1" XGA(1024x768) TN TFT LCD	M(6)	One White ThinkLight Supports^{ThinkPad Port Replicator}	Microsoft Windows 98 Second Edition Windows 2000 Professional
A22m (14")	Apr 2001	317 x 267 x 45.7mm (12.5 x 10.5 x 1.8")	3.1 kg (6.8 lb)	Intel Mobile Pentium III^{(Coppermine)} FSB: 100MT/s	Intel 440BX	512MB^{(2x PC-100 SDR SO-DIMM)}	ATI Rage Mobility M^{(4MB SDRAM, AGP 2X)} or M1^{(8MB SDRAM, AGP 2X)}	One UltraBay 2000, One 2.5" IDE	Lucent 56K modem or Intel 10/100 Ethernet with Xircom1 56K modem or 3Com 10/100 Ethernet with 3Com or Lucent 56K modem^{in Communications Bay} Optional 802.11b Wireless LAN^{in PC-Card slot}	Crystal Semiconductor CS4624 with CS4297A Intel AC'97 codec 0.5W Stereo speakers Internal microphone	12.1" SVGA(800x600), or 14.1" XGA(1024x768) TN TFT LCD	M(9); U	One White ThinkLight Supports^{ThinkPad Port Replicator; ThinkPad Dock} One 3.5" 1.44MB Floppy drive^{(Unremovable)}	Microsoft Windows 98 Second Edition Windows 2000 Professional
A22m (15")	Apr 2001	330 x 267 x 45.7mm (13.0 x 10.5 x 1.8")	3.1 kg (6.8 lb)	Intel Mobile Pentium III^{(Coppermine)} FSB: 100MT/s	Intel 440BX	512MB^{(2x PC-100 SDR SO-DIMM)}	ATI Rage Mobility M^{(4MB SDRAM, AGP 2X)} or M1^{(8MB SDRAM, AGP 2X)}	One UltraBay 2000, One 2.5" IDE	Lucent 56K modem or Intel 10/100 Ethernet with Xircom1 56K modem or 3Com 10/100 Ethernet with 3Com or Lucent 56K modem^{in Communications Bay} Optional 802.11b Wireless LAN^{in PC-Card slot}	Crystal Semiconductor CS4624 with CS4297A Intel AC'97 codec 0.5W Stereo speakers Internal microphone	15.0" XGA(1024x768) TN TFT LCD	M(9); U	One White ThinkLight Supports^{ThinkPad Port Replicator; ThinkPad Dock} One 3.5" 1.44MB Floppy drive^{(Unremovable)}	Microsoft Windows 98 Second Edition Windows 2000 Professional
A22p	Apr 2001	335.8 x 271.8 x 45.7mm (13.2 x 10.7 x 1.8")	3.5 kg (7.7 lb)	Intel Mobile Pentium III^{(Coppermine)} FSB: 100MT/s	Intel 440BX	512MB^{(2x PC-100 SDR SO-DIMM)}	ATI Rage Mobility 128^{(16MB SGRAM, AGP 2X)}	One UltraBay 2000, One 2.5" IDE	Lucent 56K modem or Intel 10/100 Ethernet with Xircom1 56K modem^{in Communications Bay}	Crystal Semiconductor CS4624 with CS4297A Intel AC'97 codec 0.5W Stereo speakers Internal microphone	15.0" UXGA(1600x1200) TN TFT LCD	M(9); U	One White ThinkLight Supports^{ThinkPad Port Replicator; ThinkPad Dock} One 3.5" 1.44MB Floppy drive^{(Unremovable)} One UltraPort	Microsoft Windows 98 Second Edition Windows 2000 Professional

=== A3x Specifications ===
Model	Release (US)	Dimensions^{(w, d, h)}	Weight^{(min)}	CPU	Chipset	Memory ^{(max)}	Graphics	Storage	Networking	Audio	Screen	Battery	Other	Operating System
A30	Oct 2001	330 x 272 x 45.8 mm (13 x 10.7 x 1.8")	3.27 kg (7.2 lb)	Intel Mobile Pentium III-M^{(Tutalin)} FSB: 133MT/s	Intel 830MP	1GB^{(2x PC-133 SDR SO-DIMM)}	ATI Mobility Radeon 7000^{(16MB DDR-SDRAM, AGP 4X)}	One UltraBay Plus, One UltraBay 2000, One 2.5" IDE	Optional Intel 82562ET 10/100 Ethernet^{in CDC 1 slot} Optional 802.11b Wireless LAN with Lucent 56K modem^{in mini PCI slot} or Lucent 56K modem^{in CDC 2 slot (Exclusive)}	Intel 440MX Audio with CS4299 Intel AC'97 codec 1W Stereo speakers Internal microphone	14.1" XGA(1024x768) or 15.0" XGA(1024x768) or 15.0" SXGA+(1400x1050) TN TFT LCD	M(6); U	One White ThinkLight Supports^{ThinkPad Port Replicator; ThinkPad Dock}	Microsoft Windows 98 Second Edition Windows 2000 Professional Windows XP Professional
A30p	Oct 2001	330 x 272 x 45.8 mm (13 x 10.7 x 1.8")	3.45 kg (7.6 lb)	Intel Mobile Pentium III-M^{(Tutalin)} FSB: 133MT/s	Intel 830MP	1GB^{(2x PC-133 SDR SO-DIMM)}	ATI Mobility Radeon 7000^{(32MB DDR-SDRAM, AGP 4X)}	One UltraBay Plus, One UltraBay 2000, One 2.5" IDE	Optional Intel 82562ET 10/100 Ethernet^{in CDC 1 slot} Optional 802.11b Wireless LAN with Lucent 56K modem or Lucent Modem^{in mini PCI slot (Exclusive)} Optional Bluetooth 1.1^{CDC 2 slot}	Intel 440MX Audio with CS4299 Intel AC'97 codec 1W Stereo speakers Internal microphone	15.0" UXGA(1600x1200) IPS TFT LCD	M(6); U	One White ThinkLight Supports^{ThinkPad Port Replicator; ThinkPad Dock} One UltraPort	Microsoft Windows 2000 Professional Windows XP Professional
A31	Mar 2002	330 x 272.5 x 45.8 mm (13 x 10.7 x 1.8")	3.27 kg (7.2 lb)	Intel Mobile Pentium 4-M^{(Northwood)} FSB: 400MT/s	Intel 845MP	1GB^{(2x DDR-266 SO-DIMM)}	ATI Mobility Radeon 7500^{(16 or 32MB DDR-SDRAM, AGP 4X)}	One UltraBay Plus, One UltraBay 2000, One 2.5" IDE	Intel 82562ET 10/100 Ethernet^{in CDC 1 slot} Optional 802.11b Wireless LAN with Lucent 56K modem^{in mini PCI slot} or Lucent or Agere 56K modem^{in CDC 2 slot (Exclusive)}	Analog Devices AD1881A with AD1881A AC'97 codec 1W Stereo speakers Internal microphone	14.1" XGA(1024x768) or 15.0" XGA(1024x768) or 15.0" SXGA+(1400x1050) TN TFT LCD	M(6); U	One White ThinkLight Supports^{ThinkPad Port Replicator; ThinkPad Port Replicator II; ThinkPad Dock I ThinkPad Dock II; ThinkPad Mini Dock}	Microsoft Windows 2000 Professional Windows XP Professional Windows XP Home Edition
A31p	Mar 2002	330 x 272.5 x 45.8 mm (13 x 10.7 x 1.8")	3.49 kg (7.7 lb)	Intel Mobile Pentium 4-M^{(Northwood)} FSB: 400MT/s	Intel 845MP	1GB^{(2x DDR-266 SO-DIMM)}	ATI Mobility FireGL 7800^{(64MB DDR-SDRAM, AGP 4X)}	One UltraBay Plus, One UltraBay 2000, One 2.5" IDE	Intel 82562ET 10/100 Ethernet ^{in CDC 1 slot} Optional 802.11b Wireless LAN with Lucent 56K modem^{in mini PCI slot} and Bluetooth 1.1^{CDC 2 slot} or Lucent 56K modem^{in CDC 2 slot (Exclusive)}	Analog Devices AD1881A with AD1881A AC'97 codec 1W Stereo speakers Internal microphone	15.0" UXGA(1600x1200) IPS TFT LCD	M(6); U	One White ThinkLight Supports^{ThinkPad Port Replicator; ThinkPad Port Replicator II; ThinkPad Dock I ThinkPad Dock II; ThinkPad Mini Dock} One UltraPort	Microsoft Windows 2000 Professional Windows XP Professional

== Known Issues ==
These are issues that can cause premature failure of the laptop due to faulty hardware design. These issues are also a direct pull from the Thinkwiki article "Known Problems" and therefore will reference that ThinkWiki article

=== A2x and T2x ===
The entire A2x line and the T2x line (excluding the T23) was plagued by the infamous BOD (Blink of Death) where voltage regulators would fail and cause the laptop to not boot and there will only be a short flash of the hard drive indicator. More information about how this issue can be fixed found on the ThinkPads forum.

=== A3x ===
All A3x ThinkPads have faulty VRAM chips which will fail and GPUs with bad solder material which would fracture and cause garbled graphics. The solder cracking was caused by a combination of new RoHS regulations at the time banning leaded solder by July 1, 2006 and the lack GPU cooling. Due to lead-free solder being harder than leaded solder, lead-free solder was more brittle, and when combined with thermal cycling, exascerbated by the lack of GPU cooling, lead to the cracked solder.

The sound cards on the A31 and A31p model ThinkPads are also known to fail. A fix is to purchase a PCMCIA sound card.
