= ThinkPad Z series =

Series of laptop computers

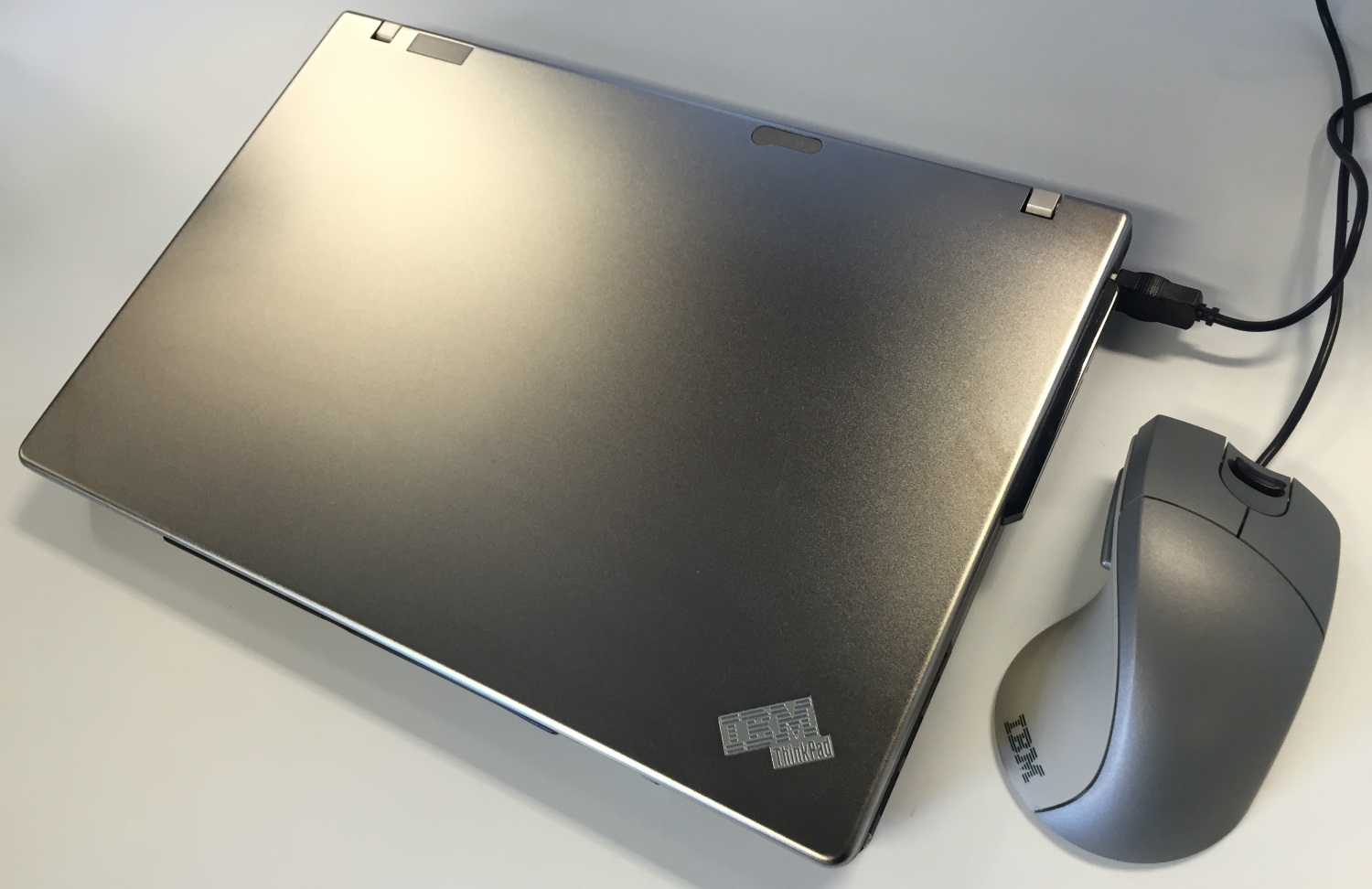
- ThinkPad Z61t
- Developer: Lenovo (2005–2007, 2022–2023)
- Type: Multimedia Laptop
- Released: 20 September 2005
- CPU: Intel Pentium M, Intel Core, Intel Core 2, AMD Ryzen Pro 6000 series, AMD Ryzen Pro 7000 Series

The ThinkPad Z series was initially a very short-lived series of laptop computers focused on multimedia features and capabilities that came about after the Lenovo acquisition in 2005. It introduced a few features to the ThinkPad brand, including 16:10 displays, and webcams (only Z61m and Z61t). The series was introduced in 2005 with the Z60m and Z60t (which were equivalent to the R52), which are 15.4" and 14.1" respectively. Z series would however eventually get merged with T60 and result in a new widescreen model (15.4" only, however) being announced in November 2006, effectively invalidating its existence at the time.

In 2022, Lenovo released new variants in the Z series in the form of the Z13 and Z16. The brand was marketed as a true slim and light premium device that showcased AMD's Ryzen 6000 series mobile processors, in line with the X1 Carbon. It was meant to compete against a similar offering in the form of Apple's MacBook Air and the Dell XPS 13. Due to the last generation being released at the tail end of 2023, some question whether the line has become abandoned once more.

== History and reception ==
The ThinkPad Z60m and Z60t were announced on 20 September 2005. Reviewers praised them for their design, including the new titanium lid, as well as performance with the then-current Dothan architecture Pentium M and, for the Z60m, Mobility Radeon X600 graphics. On the 16th of May 2006, the first two models were replaced by the Z61m and Z61t, featuring a new architecture built around the Intel Core platform, a 0.3mp webcam, as well as a proper 16:10 aspect ratio screen for the Z61t instead of the somewhat uncommon 5:3 screen of the Z60t. The cost reduced Z61e was also announced then, using the chassis of the Z61m, although lacks a trackpad, dedicated graphics, among other features, as with the R60e to the R60

The new Z61m and Z61t were also quite well received, although NOTEBOOKCHECK noted that the Z61m was oversized, while a user on forum.thinkpads.com pointed out that the Z61t was smaller than the 14.1" widescreen T61. Later models came with Core 2 Duo processors.

The new high-end Z61p model was announced on the 18th of July 2006. It introduced a higher resolution 1920×1200 screen, ATI FirePro V5200, and came with the option of newer Core 2 Duo CPUs right from the start. However, like the Z61e, it lacked a titanium lid option.

On the 28th of November 2006, the Z61m and Z61p would be replaced by the 15.4" widescreen T60 and T60p. The Z61t wouldn't get properly replaced until the 9th of May 2007, when the 14.1" widescreen T61 was announced, based on an updated architecture. It would also get a 15.4" widescreen and 14.1" 4:3 release, though the latter was very short-lived

Model	Release (US)	Dimensions (mm / in)	Weight ^{(min)}	CPU	Memory ^{(max)}	Graphics	Storage	Networking	Audio	Screen	Battery	Other	Operating System
14"
ThinkPad Z60t	September 2005	334 × 228 × 26.6; 13.15 × 8.98 × 1.05	2.0–2.3 kg (4.4–5.1 lb)	Intel Pentium M 740; 750; 760; 770; 780; Intel Celeron M 360J; 370; 380	256 MB; 512 MB; 1 GB; DDR2-533 MHz	Intel GMA 900	40 GB; 60 GB; 80 GB; 100 GB (SATA hard drive)	BCM5752M Gigabit Ethernet; Atheros AR5006EX Optional; BT 2.0; V.92 56K Modem	High Definition (HD) Audio & AD1981HD with stereo speakers,volume up, down, mute buttons, internal microphone and microphone/headphone jack	Anti-Glare: 14.0" 1280x768 200 nits	4-cell or 7-cell	Optional; Fingerprint Sensor	
ThinkPad Z61t	May 2006	334 × 228 × 26.6; 13.15 × 8.98 × 1.05	2.1–2.4 kg (4.6–5.3 lb)	Intel Celeron M 410; 420 Intel Core Duo; T2300E; T2400; T2500; Intel Core 2 Duo; T5500; T7200	256 MB; 512 MB; 1 GB; 2 GB; DDR2-667 MHz	Intel GMA 950	60 GB; 80 GB; 100 GB; 120 GB (SATA hard drive)	BCM5752M Gigabit Ethernet Atheros AR5006EX; Intel PRO/Wireless 3945ABG; Optional BT 2.0; V.92 56K Modem Optional WWAN Slot; Sierra Wireless 1xEV-DO	High Definition (HD) Audio & AD1981HD with stereo speakers,volume up, down, mute buttons, internal microphone and microphone/headphone jack	Anti-Glare: 14.0" 1280x768 200 nits 14.1" 1280x800 185 nits 14.1" 1440x900 200 nits	4-cell or 7-cell	Optional; Fingerprint Sensor	
15.4"
ThinkPad Z60m	September 2005	357 × 263 × 37.3; 14.06 × 10.35 × 1.47	3.1–3.3 kg (6.8–7.3 lb)	Intel Pentium M 740; 750; 760; 770; 780; Intel Celeron M 360J; 370; 380	256 MB; 512 MB; 1 GB; DDR2-533 MHz	Intel GMA 900; Optional Discrete; ATI Mobility Radeon X300 64MB; ATI Mobility Radeon X600 128MB	40 GB; 60 GB; 80 GB; 100 GB (SATA hard drive)	BCM5752M Gigabit Ethernet Atheros AR5006EX; Optional BT 2.0; V.92 56K Modem		Anti-Glare: 15.4" 1280x800 200 nits 15.4" 1280x800 300 nits 15.4" 1680x1050 200 nits	6-cell or 9-cell	Optional; Fingerprint Sensor	
ThinkPad Z61m	May 2006	357 × 263 × 37.3; 14.06 × 10.35 × 1.47	2.9–3.3 kg (6.4–7.3 lb)	Intel Celeron M 410; 420 Intel Core Duo; T2300E; T2400; T2500; Intel Core 2 Duo; T5500; T7200	256 MB; 512 MB; 1 GB; 2 GB; DDR2-667 MHz	Intel GMA 950; Optional Discrete; ATI Mobility Radeon X1300 64MB; ATI Mobility Radeon X1400 128MB	60 GB; 80 GB; 100 GB; 120 GB (SATA hard drive)	BCM5752M Gigabit Ethernet Atheros AR5006EX; Intel PRO/Wireless 3945ABG; Optional BT 2.0; V.92 56K Modem Optional WWAN Slot; Sierra Wireless 1xEV-DO		Anti-Glare: 15.4" 1280x800 150 nits 15.4" 1280x800 200 nits 15.4" 1680x1050 200 nits	6-cell or 9-cell	Optional; Fingerprint Sensor	
ThinkPad Z61e	May 2006	357 × 263 × 37.3; 14.06 × 10.35 × 1.47	2.5–2.9 kg (5.5–6.4 lb)	Intel Celeron M 410; 420 Intel Core Solo; T1300; T1400; Intel Core 2 Duo; T7200	256 MB; 512 MB; 1 GB; DDR2-667 MHz	Intel GMA 950	40 GB; 60 GB; 80 GB (SATA hard drive)	BCM5752M gigabit ethernet Atheros AR5006EX; V.92 56K Modem		Anti-Glare: 15.4" 1280x800 200 nits	6-cell		
ThinkPad Z61p	July 2006	357 × 263 × 37.3; 14.06 × 10.35 × 1.47	3.2–3.3 kg (7.1–7.3 lb)	Intel Core Duo; T2500 Intel Core 2 Duo; T7200	1 GB; DDR2-667 MHz	ATI Mobility FireGL V5200 256MB	100 GB (SATA hard drive)	BCM5752M gigabit ethernet Atheros AR5006EX; Intel PRO/Wireless 3945ABG; Optional BT 2.0; V.92 56K Modem Optional WWAN Slot; Sierra Wireless 1xEV-DO		Anti-Glare: 15.4" 1920x1200 175 nits	6-cell or 9-cell	Optional; Fingerprint Sensor	

== Modern Redesign ==
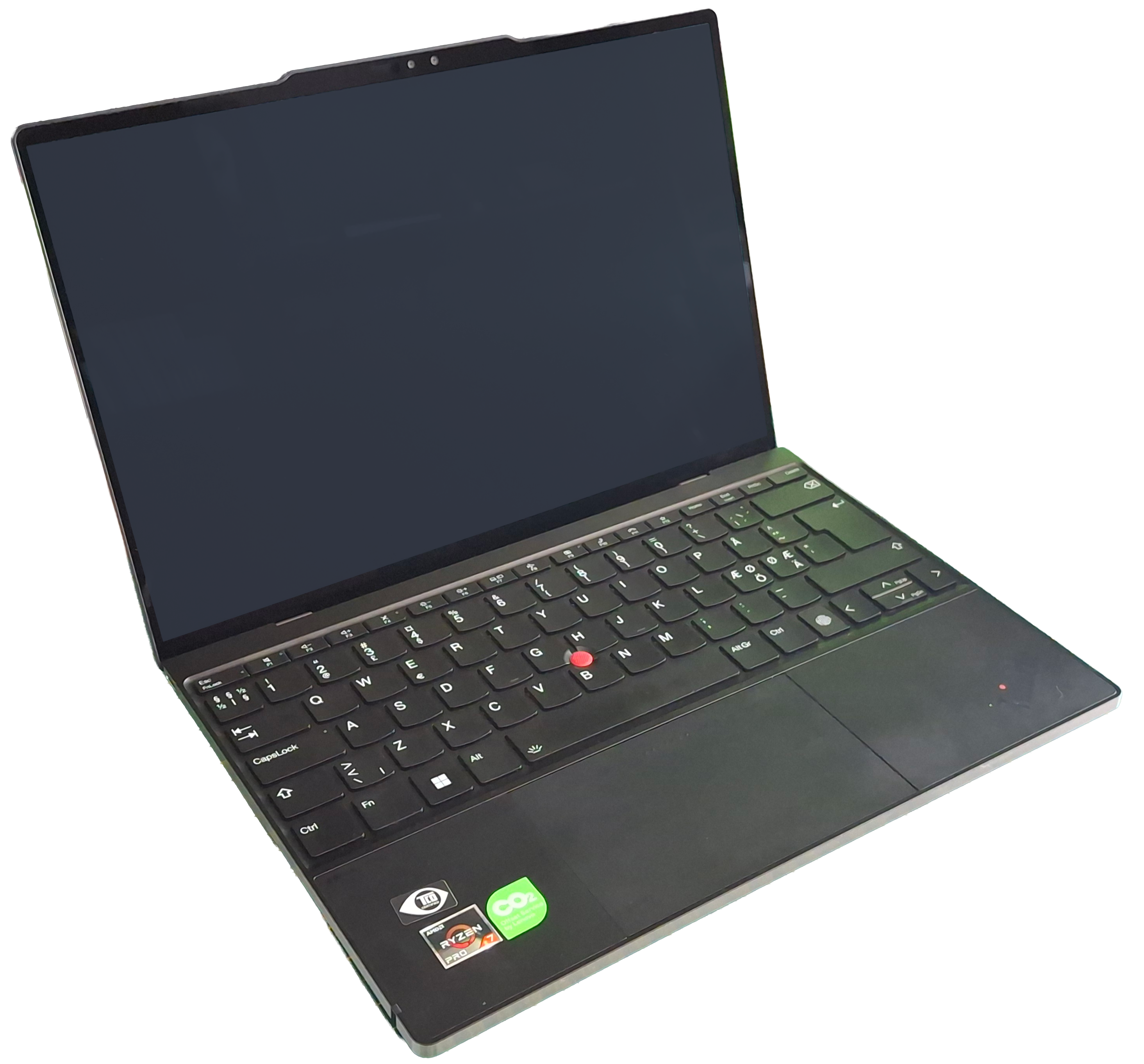
A 2022 Gen 1 Thinkpad Z13 in the Arctic Gray colour scheme.

The modern release of the laptops came in January 2022. The Z13 initially came with a redesign with 3 different variants. The first came with a leather top and bronze accents with a black bottom plate, The second was an all-black model without the bronze highlights and leather top, and the last was a silver variant that was made out of recycled aluminum and was similar to the all-black variant. The Z16 did not contain the leather top option and only came in silver top with black bottom. These premium materials were to signify the flagship position that Lenovo was marketing these devices towards. Directly competing with similar offerings from ASUS, Apple, and Dell at the time.

The keyboard was redesigned to be slimmer. Red trackpoint is present, but removed dedicated trackpoint buttons in favor of a haptic trackpad. There is an added “Communications Bar” on the lid that houses the webcam, Windows Hello IR sensor, and microphone array. All USB ports are USB-C only, but are capable of supporting 40Gbit/s throughput using Thunderbolt 4/USB4.

The modern devices do not have any Intel variants, all have AMD Ryzen processors. Due to this, some have speculated that this line was meant as a showcase for AMD processors and their integrated GPUs.

=== 2022 ===
==== Z13 Gen 1 ====
AMD's Ryzen 6000 Pro series processors were the only configurable option on the device. All ran 6xx Radeon integrated graphics. The RAM was able to configured up to 32 GB of soldered LPDDR5-6400Mhz. The storage could be configured up to a 1 TB NVMe 2242 SSD. A WWAN slot was available to add 4G-LTE connectivity.

Model	Release (US)	Dimensions (mm / in)	Weight ^{(min)}	CPU	Memory ^{(max)}	Graphics	Storage	Networking	Audio	Screen	Battery	Other	Operating System
13"
ThinkPad Z13; Gen 1	January 2022	294.4 × 199.6 × 13.99; 11.59 × 7.86 × 0.55	1.19–1.26 kg (2.6–2.8 lb)	AMD Ryzen Pro; 5 6650U; 7 6850U; 7 6860Z	16 GB; 32 GB; LPDDR5-6400 MHz; Soldered	AMD Radeon 660M (Ryzen Pro 5) AMD Radeon 680M (Ryzen Pro 7)	256GB; 512GB; 1TB (Single NVME 2242 SSD)	No Onboard Ethernet; Qualcomm Wi-Fi 6E (NFA725A) + BT 5.2 (soldered); Optional WWAN Slot; Quectel EM05-G, 4G LTE CAT4; Fibocom L860-GL-16, 4G LTE CAT16	High Definition (HD) Audio & Realtek ALC3306 with stereo speakers within Dolby Atmos and dual-microphone array, 360° far-field with Dolby Voice	Anti-Glare: 1920x1200 IPS 400 nits Non-Touch Anti-Reflection/Anti-Smudge: 1920x1200 IPS 400 nits Multi-Touch Anti-Reflection/Anti-Smudge: 2880x1800 OLED 400 nits Multi-Touch	m 51.5Wh	Haptic Touchpad Optional; Fingerprint Sensor Two USB4 USB Type-C Full Function	Windows 11 Pro; Windows 11 Home; Windows 11 Home Single Language; Windows 11 DG Windows 10 Pro; Fedora Linux; Ubuntu Linux; Linux

==== Z16 Gen 1 ====
Similar to the z13 1st gen, the Z16 1st gen had AMD's Ryzen 6000 Pro series processors. However, the laptop could be configured with either 6xx Radeon integrated graphics or the Radeon 6500M dedicated graphics. The RAM was able to configured up to 32 GB of soldered LPDDR5-6400Mhz. The storage could be configured up to a 2 TB NVMe 2280 SSD. A WWAN slot was available to add 4G-LTE connectivity.

Model	Release (US)	Dimensions (mm / in)	Weight ^{(min)}	CPU	Memory ^{(max)}	Graphics	Storage	Networking	Audio	Screen	Battery	Other	Operating System
16"
ThinkPad Z16; Gen 1	January 2022	354.4 × 237.4 × 15.8; 13.95 × 9.35 × 0.62	1.81–1.94 kg (4.0–4.3 lb)	AMD Ryzen Pro; 5 6650H; 7 6850H; 9 6950H	16 GB; 32 GB; LPDDR5-6400 MHz; Soldered	AMD Radeon 660M (Ryzen Pro 5) AMD Radeon 680M (Ryzen Pro 7/9) Optional Discrete; AMD Radeon 6500M 4GB GDDR6	256GB; 512GB; 1TB; 2TB (Single NVME 2280 SSD)	No Onboard Ethernet Qualcomm Wifi 6E (NFA725A) + BT 5.2 (soldered) Optional WWAN Slot; Quectel EM05-G, 4G LTE CAT4; Fibocom L860-GL-16, 4G LTE CAT16	High Definition (HD) Audio & Realtek ALC3306 with stereo speakers within Dolby Atmos and dual-microphone array, 360° far-field with Dolby Voice	Anti-Glare: 1920x1200 IPS 400 nits Non-Touch Anti-Reflection/Anti-Smudge: 1920x1200 IPS 400 nits Multi-Touch Anti-Reflection/Anti-Smudge: 3840x2400 OLED 400 nits Multi-Touch	m 72Wh	Haptic Touchpad Optional; Fingerprint Sensor Two USB4 USB Type-C Full Function + One USB-C 10Gbps + One SD Card Reader	Windows 11 Pro; Windows 11 Home; Windows 11 Home Single Language; Windows 11 DG Windows 10 Pro; Fedora Linux; Ubuntu Linux; Linux

=== 2023 ===
The Z13 and Z16 Gen 2 was announced in July 2023, with the official launch in October that year. The overall design of the device remains similar to the 1st gen. The internals of the device were refreshed to include AMD Ryzen 7000 Pro series and options to increase the memory up to 64 GB of LPDDR5x-6400Mhz (The RAM was rated at 7500 MHz, but needed to be downclocked due to platform limitations.)

==== Z13 Gen 2 ====
One of the notable design differences between the first and second generations is the removal of the Leather-topped lid in favor of a Flax Fiber cloth lid. The all-black option was also removed from this generation, but the recycled aluminum option was still available.

Model	Release (US)	Dimensions (mm / in)	Weight ^{(min)}	CPU	Memory ^{(max)}	Graphics	Storage	Networking	Audio	Screen	Battery	Other	Operating System
13"
ThinkPad Z13; Gen 2	October 2023	294.4 × 199.6 × 13.99; 11.59 × 7.86 × 0.55	1.19–1.29 kg (2.6–2.8 lb)	AMD Ryzen Pro; 5 7540U; 7 7840U NPU 10 TOPS	16 GB; 32 GB; 64 GB; LPDDR5x-7500 MHz; Soldered 6400 Mhz due to platform limitations	AMD Radeon 740M (Ryzen Pro 5) AMD Radeon 780M (Ryzen Pro 7)	256GB; 512GB; 1TB; 2TB (Single NVME 2242 SSD)	No Onboard Ethernet MediaTek Wifi 6E (RZ616) + BT 5.3 (soldered) Optional WWAN Slot; Quectel EM05-G, 4G LTE CAT4	High Definition (HD) Audio & Realtek ALC3306 with stereo speakers within Dolby Atmos and dual-microphone array, 360° far-field with Dolby Voice	Anti-Glare: 1920x1200 IPS 400 nits Non-Touch Anti-Reflection/Anti-Smudge: 1920x1200 IPS 400 nits Multi-Touch Anti-Reflection/Anti-Smudge: 2880x1800 OLED 400 nits Multi-Touch	m 51.5Wh	Haptic Touchpad Optional; Fingerprint Sensor Two USB4 USB Type-C Full Function	Windows 11 Pro; Windows 11 Home; Windows 11 Home Single Language; Windows 11 DG Windows 10 Pro; Fedora Linux; Ubuntu Linux; Linux

==== Z16 Gen 2 ====
The only notable feature difference between the first and second generations was the removal of the optional WWAN slot in the machine. Interestingly, the Z13 keeps the feature with the same optional 4G Modem as the first generation.

Model	Release (US)	Dimensions (mm / in)	Weight ^{(min)}	CPU	Memory ^{(max)}	Graphics	Storage	Networking	Audio	Screen	Battery	Other	Operating System
16"
ThinkPad Z16; Gen 2	October 2023	354.4 × 237.4 × 15.8; 13.95 × 9.35 × 0.62	1.81–1.94 kg (4.0–4.3 lb)	AMD Ryzen Pro; 5 7640HS; 7 7840HS; 9 7940HS NPU 10 TOPS	16 GB; 32 GB; 64 GB; LPDDR5x-7500 MHz; Soldered 6400 Mhz due to platform limitations	AMD Radeon 760M (Ryzen Pro 5) AMD Radeon 780M (Ryzen Pro 7/9) Optional Discrete; AMD Radeon 6650M 4GB GDDR6	256GB; 512GB; 1TB; 2TB (Single NVME 2280 SSD)	No Onboard Ethernet MediaTek Wifi 6E (RZ616) + BT 5.3 (soldered) No WWAN Slot	High Definition (HD) Audio & Realtek ALC3306 with stereo speakers within Dolby Atmos and dual-microphone array, 360° far-field with Dolby Voice	Anti-Glare: 1920x1200 IPS 400 nits Non-Touch Anti-Reflection/Anti-Smudge: 1920x1200 IPS 400 nits Multi-Touch Anti-Reflection/Anti-Smudge: 3840x2400 OLED 400 nits Multi-Touch	m 72Wh	Haptic Touchpad Optional; Fingerprint Sensor Two USB4 USB Type-C Full Function + One USB-C 10Gbit/s + One SD Card Reader	Windows 11 Pro; Windows 11 Home; Windows 11 Home Single Language; Windows 11 DG Windows 10 Pro; Fedora Linux; Ubuntu Linux; Linux

== Modern Reception ==
Critics rated the devices favorably upon release. Often pointing out the performance per watt, the portable form factor, and the new look as being general positive overall. However, critics argued against the redesign, favoring only USB-C connectors. Lamenting the use of USB-C dongles in order to connect non-USB-C devices.

There was also the issue of heat dissipation, as some reviewers noted that the keyboard gets particularly hot under stress. The keyboard itself was also a point of contention due to the size not accommodating those with larger fingers.

The looks were also polarizing. Some did not feel that the redesign made the device feel more of a fashion statement rather than a laptop. Others question the design from straying away from the rest of the ThinkPad line-up. Arguing that the device should not be considered a ThinkPad and was more in line with consumer-focused laptops.

== Gallery ==
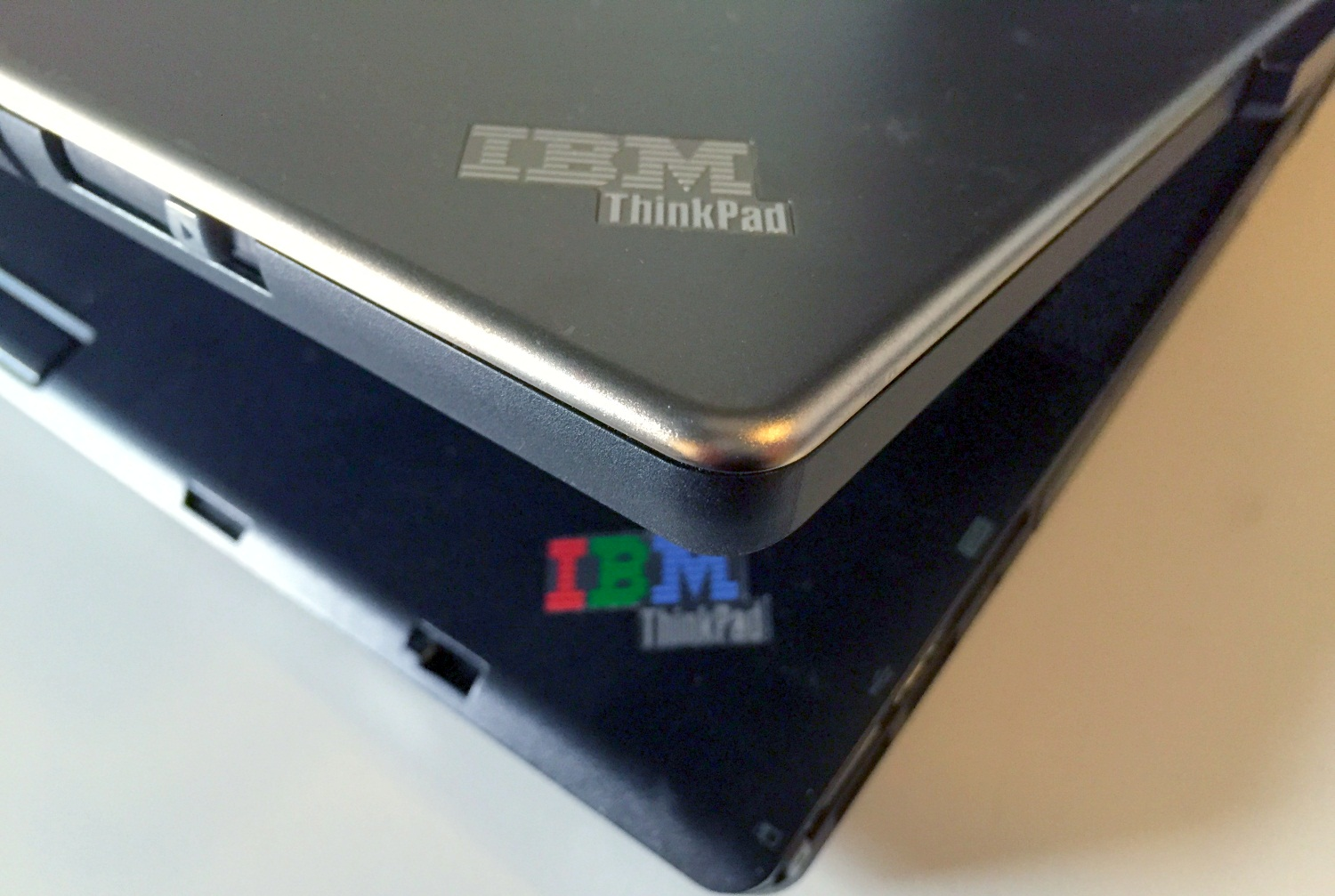
Z61t with the titanium lid, partially open

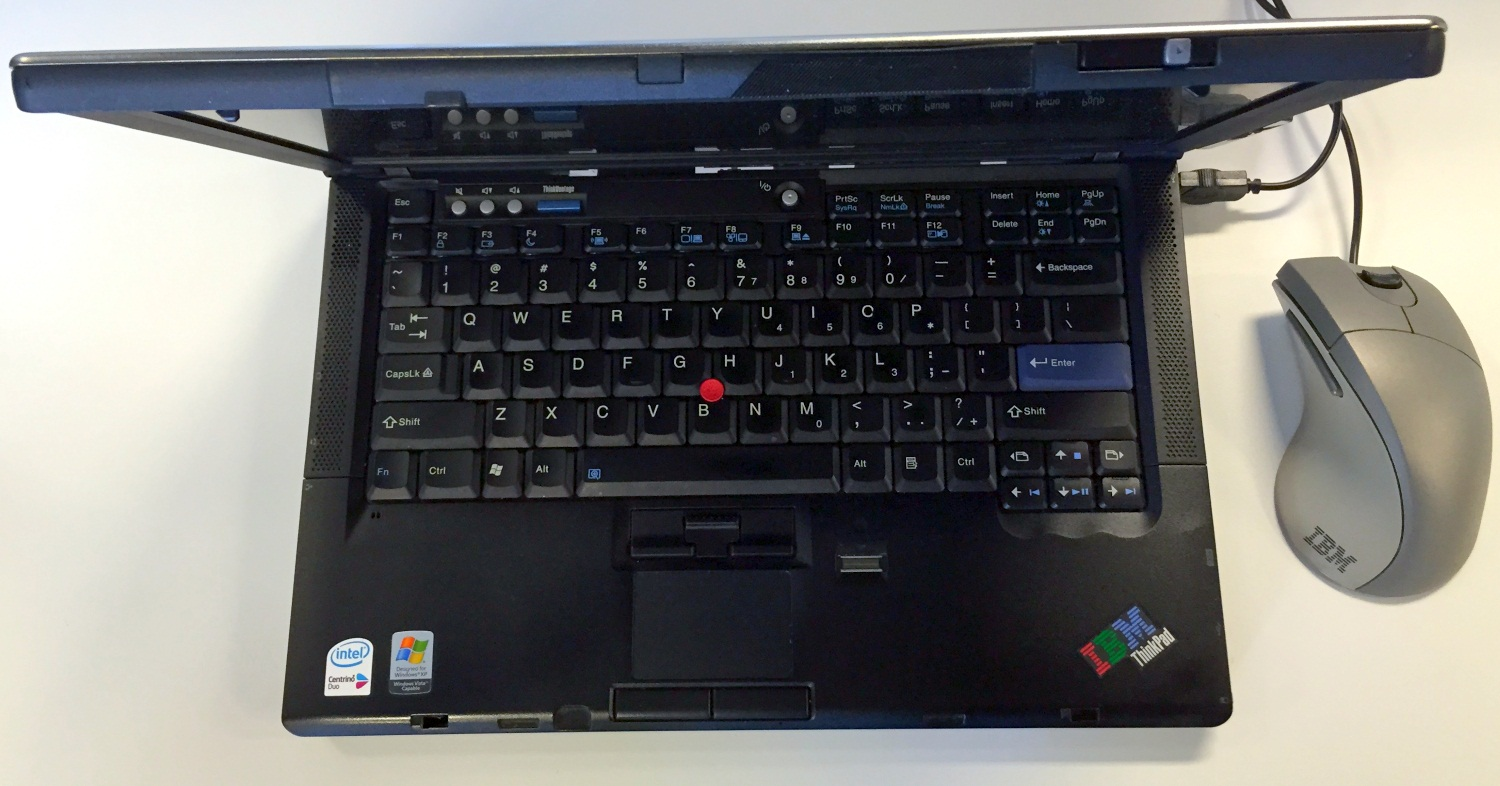
Z61t with the titanium lid, this time mostly open

== See also ==
- ThinkPad X Series
- ThinkPad X1 Series
