= ThinkPad G series =

Series of laptops made by IBM

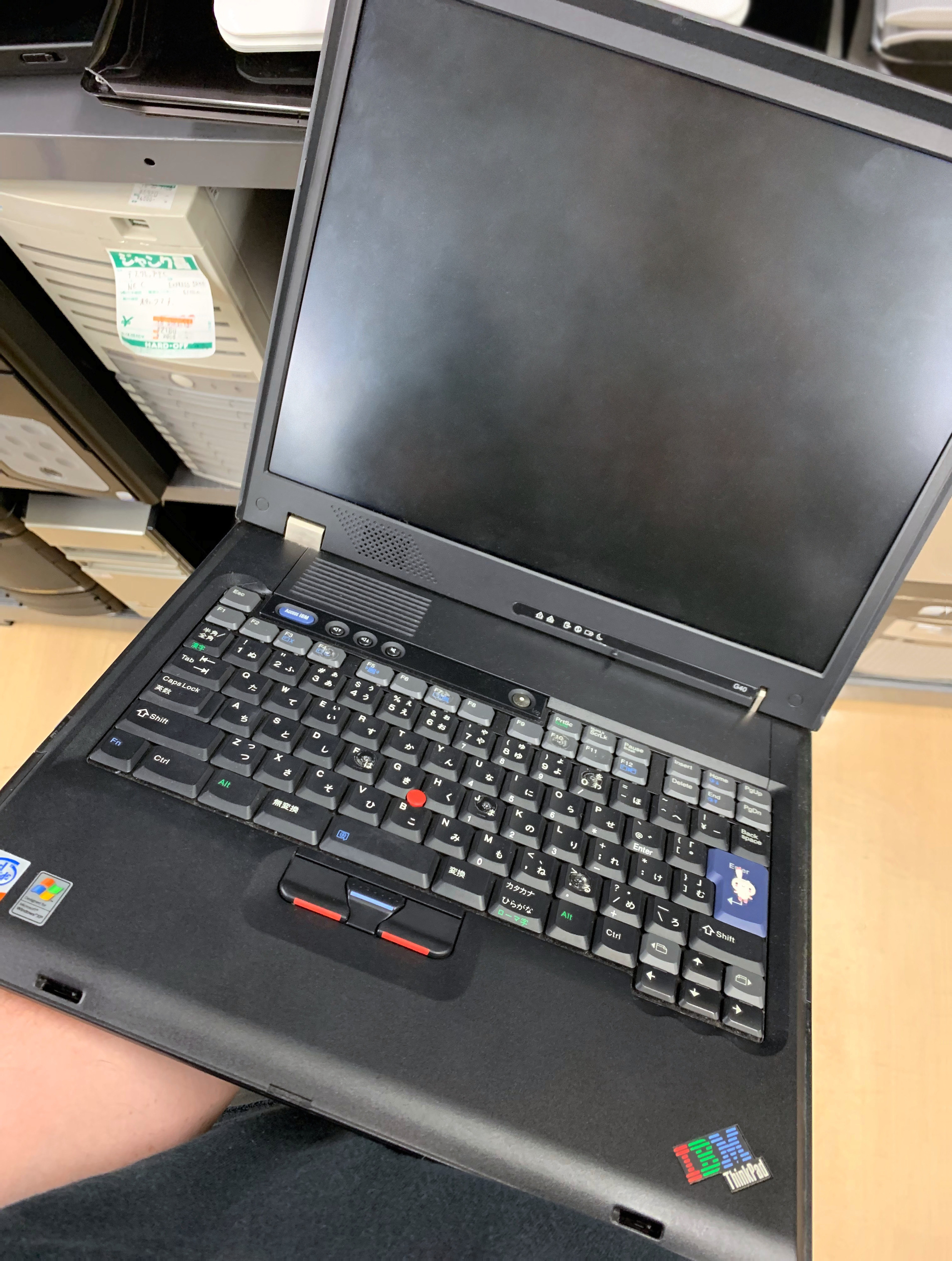
- ThinkPad G40
- Developer: IBM (2003–2004)
- Product family: ThinkPad
- Released: 2003
- Discontinued: 2005
- Operating system: Microsoft Windows
- CPU: Intel Pentium 4 Intel Celeron/Celeron D/Celeron M Intel Core Duo
- Successor: ThinkPad R series
- Related: ThinkPad A series
- Website: pc.ibm.com at the Wayback Machine (archived 2005-03-15)

The ThinkPad G series was a line of desktop replacement ThinkPad laptops developed by IBM as partial successors to the ThinkPad A series. Positioned as a budget-friendly alternative to the desktop replacement models of the T and R series with the "p" suffix, the short-lived series was and still is the only ThinkPad series to use a desktop CPU (except G50). Three generations were released from when it was released in 2003 to when it was succeeded in 2005 by the ThinkPad R series.

== G40 and G41 ==
The G40 and G41 were based on an Intel Pentium 4 and were released as low-end, affordable and massive successors of Pentium 4-M-equipped 15" ThinkPad A31 and 14" ThinkPad T30.

They were both manufactured by Acer for IBM.

Due to the machine's power consumption, the G40 and G41 had a unique four-pronged power connector only shared with the ThinkPad Mini-Dock

=== Critical reception ===
In a review by CNET in 2004, the G40 was given a 7.3 stating that while the laptop was big and heavy with a mediocre screen, the ThinkPad G40 "proves you can get a capable desktop replacement at an affordable price without sacrificing battery life and performance."

In another review by ZDNet in 2003, recommending the G40 to people who want the capabilities of a desktop but not the clutter, the author stated that the G40's "keyboard is comfortable, the screen easy to read, and the specifications, features and performance about right for a typical home/home office PC."

In their review of the G40 in 2003, The Register commented on the laptops 3.5 kg weight contradicting "IBMs talk of the mobile worker, and not sacrificing power for portability." They also expressed concerns of the Access IBM button being a "scarily Big Brother single button access to Big Blue" but did ease the concern by explaining the actual reason as making the G40 easier to deploy in a corporate environment. The Register concluded that the G40's ideal user was the "migrant": "Working in a flexible office environment, and occasionally from home."

=== Features ===
As a sign of their low cost placement, the G40 and G41 did not include a ThinkLight, docking connector, nor stereo speakers. Though they have both a floppy drive and an optical drive, both do not have eject mechanisms and the optical drive bay is not an Ultrabay. They also were not optionable with IPS screens nor trackpad. While they both use desktop CPUs, they also used anemic Intel integrated graphics with only some G41's optioned with NVIDIA Geforce FX Go5200 graphics.

Both models have the option of either 15" or 14.1" screens with same case. For the 14.1" screen option, both the G40 and the G41 were offered with XGA(1024x768). For the 15" screen option, both models were offered with either XGA(1024x768) or SXGA+(1400x1050) displays.

== G50 ==
The G50 was released in 2004. It retained the overall design of G40 and G41 but was based on the new Intel Core architecture which consumes less power than previous Pentium 4 processors. With the shift to the new architecture, the G50 now used SATA instead of IDE hard drives and used DDR2 instead of DDR SDRAM.

The G50 is only available in 15" screen size with either XGA(1024x768) or SXGA+(1400x1050) resolutions and was only sold in Japan.

The G50 returned to using IBM's standardised Thinkpad power connector of the era.

Battery configuration

Main	M(x)	Main hot-swappable (max.cells)	Secondary	U	Ultrabay removable
Main	M(x)	Main hot-swappable (max.cells)	Secondary	u	Ultrabay unremovable
Main	M(x)	Main removable (max.cells)	Secondary	m(x)	internal (max.cells) "PowerBridge"
Main	m(x)	Main internal (max.cells)	Secondary	S	Slice battery

Laptop color codes

Processor

Socketed desktop processor
Socketed mobile processor
Soldered high power processor
Soldered standard power processor
Soldered low power processor
Soldered ultra low power processor

Weight

0.9 kg (2.0 lb)	Up to 0.91 kg
1.0 kg (2.2 lb)	0.92–1.0 kg
1.1 kg (2.4 lb)	1.01–1.1 kg
1.2 kg (2.6 lb)	1.11–1.2 kg
1.3 kg (2.9 lb)	1.21–1.3 kg
1.4 kg (3.1 lb)	1.31–1.4 kg
1.5 kg (3.3 lb)	1.41–1.5 kg
1.6 kg (3.5 lb)	1.51–1.6 kg
1.7 kg (3.7 lb)	1.61–1.7 kg
1.8 kg (4.0 lb)	1.71–1.81 kg
1.9 kg (4.2 lb)	1.81–1.91 kg
2.0 kg (4.4 lb)	1.91–2.03 kg
2.1 kg (4.6 lb)	2.04–2.14 kg
2.3 kg (5.1 lb)	2.15–2.4 kg
2.5 kg (5.5 lb)	2.41–2.75 kg
2.8 kg (6.2 lb)	2.76–3.05 kg
3.1 kg (6.8 lb)	3.06–3.42 kg
3.5 kg (7.7 lb)	3.43–3.99 kg
4.0 kg (8.8 lb)	4.0–4.99 kg
5.5 kg (12 lb)	5.0–6.49 kg
7.2 kg (16 lb)	6.5–7.99 kg
9.1 kg (20 lb)	8.0–9.99 kg
10.7 kg (24 lb)	10–11.99 kg
12.7 kg (28 lb)	12–14.49 kg
14.5 kg (32 lb)	14.5–17.99 kg
18.1 kg (40 lb)	18–20.99 kg
21.7 kg (48 lb)	21–23.99 kg
24 kg (53 lb)	24–28.99 kg
29.5 kg (65 lb)	29 kg and above

Screen resolution

4K or higher
1440p+ (WQHD, QXGA)
1080p+ (Full HD, UXGA)
Better than 768p (SXGA,SXGA+)
600p+ (SVGA, HD, XGA, HD+)
Up to 600p (VGA)

Graphics

Dual standard socket graphics option
Dual proprietary socket graphics option
Standard socket graphics option
Proprietary socket graphics option
Soldered performance graphics option
Soldered midrange graphics option
Soldered mainstream graphics option
Soldered entry graphics option
Integrated entry graphics
Integrated basic graphics

Laptop storage combinations (excluding WWAN slot)

Level	PCIe 4.0 x4	PCIe 3.0 x4	PCIe 3.0 x2	M.2 SATA	mSATA	1.8" SATA	2.5" SATA	1.8" IDE	2.5" IDE
	2019; Not yet (laptops)	2013	2013	2013	2009	2003	2003	1991	1988
	3						2		
	4								
	3						1		
	2						2		
	3					2			
	3								
	2						1		
	4								
	3					1			
	2					2			
	2								
	1						1		
	3								
	2					1			
	1								
	2								
	1					1			
			2				1		
							4		
		1							
			1				1		
							3		
			1						
				1			1		
					1		1		
						1	1		
							2		
									3
						1			
							1		
									2
								1	
									1

Laptop memory

Amount	LPDDR5X	LPDDR5	DDR5	LPDDR4X	LPDDR4	DDR4	LPDDR3	DDR4	DDR3L		DDR3		DDR2		DDR	SDR	EDO	FPM
Amount						dual channel		< dual channel	dual channel	< dual channel	dual channel	< dual channel	dual channel	< dual channel				
Amount	2022 (laptops)	2019 (laptops)	2020	2017	2014	2014	2012	2014	2010		2007		2003		1998	1993	1993	1987
max memory = 512 GB	N/A	N/A	512 GB	N/A	N/A	N/A	N/A	N/A	N/A	N/A	N/A	N/A	N/A	N/A	N/A	N/A	N/A	N/A
max memory = 256 GB	N/A		256 GB (4 slots)	N/A	N/A	N/A	N/A	N/A	N/A	N/A	N/A	N/A	N/A	N/A	N/A	N/A	N/A	N/A
max memory = 128 GB	128 GB		128 GB	N/A	N/A	128 GB (4 slots)	N/A	N/A	N/A	N/A	N/A	N/A	N/A	N/A	N/A	N/A	N/A	N/A
64 GB ≤ max memory < 128 GB		64 GB		N/A	N/A	64 GB	N/A	64 GB (2 slots)	64 GB (4 slots)	N/A	N/A	N/A	N/A	N/A	N/A	N/A	N/A	N/A
32 GB ≤ max memory < 64 GB				32 GB	32 GB	32 GB	N/A		32 GB	32 GB (2 slots)	32 GB (4 slots)	N/A	N/A	N/A	N/A	N/A	N/A	N/A
16 GB ≤ max memory < 32 GB						16 GB	16 GB		16 GB		16 GB	16 GB (2 slots)	16 GB (4 slots)	N/A	N/A	N/A	N/A	N/A
8 GB ≤ max memory < 16 GB						8 GB			8 GB		8 GB		8 GB	8 GB (2 slots)	8 GB (4 slots)	N/A	N/A	N/A
4 GB ≤ max memory < 8 GB						4 GB			4 GB		4 GB		4 GB		4 GB	4 GB (4 slots)	4 GB (4 slots)	N/A
2 GB ≤ max memory < 4 GB						2 GB (8 chips)			2 GB		2 GB		2 GB			2 GB	2 GB	N/A
1 GB ≤ max memory < 2 GB			1 GB (1 chip)	dual channel min	dual channel min	N/A		single channel min	1 GB		1 GB		1 GB					1 GB (4 slots)
512 MB ≤ max memory < 1 GB	N/A	N/A	N/A	single channel min	single channel min	N/A	dual channel min	half channel min	512 MB (8 chips)		512 MB (8 chips)		512 MB					512 MB
256 MB ≤ max memory < 512 MB	N/A	N/A	N/A	256 MB (1 chip)	256 MB (1 chip)	N/A	single channel min	256 MB (1 chip)	N/A	single channel min	N/A	single channel min	256 MB					
128 MB ≤ max memory < 256 MB	N/A	N/A	N/A	N/A	N/A	N/A	128 MB (1 chip)	N/A	N/A	half channel min	N/A	half channel min						
64 MB ≤ max memory < 128 MB	N/A	N/A	N/A	N/A	N/A	N/A	N/A	N/A	N/A	64 MB (1 chip)	N/A	64 MB (1 chip)						
max memory < 64 MB	N/A	N/A	N/A	N/A	N/A	N/A	N/A	N/A	N/A	N/A	N/A	N/A						

== Specifications ==
Model	Release (US)	Dimensions^{(w, d, h)}	Weight^{(min)}	CPU	Chipset	Memory ^{(max)}	Graphics	Storage	Networking	Audio	Screen	Battery	Other	Operating System
G40	Apr 2003	329 × 282.5 × 50.9 mm (12.9 × 11.1 × 2.0")	3.47 kg (7.7 lb)	Intel Celeron or Pentium 4^{(Northwood)} FSB: 400MT/s	Intel 852GM	1GB^{(2x DDR-266 SO-DIMM)}	Intel Extreme Graphics^{(8-64MB (Note: When system memory is 128MB or less, only up to 32MB will be used)) shared}	One 2.5" IDE	Broadcom BCM5901^{10/100 Ethernet} Agere 56K Modem^{in CDC slot} Optional 802.11b or g WLAN^{in mPCI slot}	Intel AC'97 2.3 Audio with an Analog Devices AD1981B SoundMAX	CCFL backlit XGA(1024x768) 14" or 15" or SXGA+(1400x1050) 15" TN TFT LCD	M(12)	One 3.5" 1.44MB Floppy drive^{(Unremovable)} One Slimline Optical drive bay^{(Unremovable)} ThinkPad ComfortSlant keyboard	Microsoft Windows XP Professional Microsoft Windows XP Home
G41	Oct 2004	329 × 282.5 × 50.9 mm (12.9 × 11.1 × 2.0")	3.5 kg (7.7 lb)	Intel Celeron or Mobile Pentium 4 HT^{(Prescott)} FSB: 533MT/s	Intel 852GME	2GB^{(2x DDR-333 SO-DIMM)}	NVIDIA GeForce FX Go5200^{(64 or 128MB)} or Intel Extreme Graphics 2^{(64MB) shared}	One 2.5" IDE	Broadcom BCM5901^{10/100 Ethernet} or Broadcom BCM5705M^{Gigabit Ethernet} Conexant 56K Modem^{in CDC slot} Optional 802.11b or g WLAN^{in mPCI slot}	Intel AC'97 2.3 Audio with an Analog Devices AD1981B SoundMAX	CCFL backlit XGA(1024x768) 14" or 15" or SXGA+(1400x1050) 15" TN TFT LCD	M(12)	One 3.5" 1.44MB Floppy drive^{(Unremovable)} One Slimline Optical drive bay^{(Unremovable)} ThinkPad ComfortSlant keyboard	Microsoft Windows XP Professional Microsoft Windows XP Home
G50	Oct 2004	329 × 282.5 × 50.9 mm (12.9 × 11.1 × 2.0")	3.3 kg (7.3 lb)	Intel Celeron M or Core Duo^{(Yonah)} FSB: 533 or 667MT/s	Intel 945GM	3GB^{(2x DDR2-667 SO-DIMM)}	Intel Graphics Media Accelerator 950^{(128MB) shared}	One 2.5" IDE	Broadcom BCM5751M^{Gigabit Ethernet} Conexant 56K Modem^{in CDC slot} Optional 802.11g WLAN^{in mPCI slot}	Intel HD Audio 1.0 with an Analog Devices AD1981HD SoundMAX	CCFL backlit XGA(1024x768) or SXGA+(1400x1050) 15" TN TFT LCD	M(12)	One 3.5" 1.44MB Floppy drive^{(Unremovable)} One Slimline Optical drive bay^{(Unremovable)} ThinkPad ComfortSlant keyboard	Microsoft Windows XP Professional
Notes														
