= ThinkVantage Technologies =

Software utilities on Lenovo computers

ThinkVantage Technologies is a set of system support utilities to reduce total cost of ownership of Lenovo brand desktop and laptop computers.

== Utilities ==
- Access Connections to graphically and securely manage and switch network connections between Ethernet, wireless LAN, and wireless WAN
- Lenovo Mobile Broadband Activation to support mobile broadband activation for Windows 7, Windows Vista, and Windows XP laptops that support it
- Active Protection System to enable the accelerometer to halt a laptop's spinning-platter hard drive
- Password Manager to save user login information for websites and Windows applications, and subsequently auto-fill those passwords on their respective sites and applications
- Client Security Solution to manage passwords, encryption keys and electronic credentials
- Fingerprint Software to manage biometric data for built-in fingerprint readers
- GPS for GPS use on Windows XP, Vista, and 7 computers
- LANDesk for ThinkVantage for client management. This is a Lenovo-exclusive version of LANDesk Management Suite designed to integrate with other ThinkVantage software
- Productivity Center to access online documentation and tools
- Power Manager to manage power usage in Windows XP, Vista, and 7 ThinkPad laptops as well as Windows XP, Vista, 7, and 8 desktops
- ThinkPad Help Center to access a user's guide for the ThinkVantage suite
- Access Help online User's Guide to search an online database of help documents
- Secure Data Disposal to shred confidential information
- System Update (TVSU) to generate a system tailored list of updates with their respective operative descriptions, and a choice of installation methods
- Base Software Administrator to customize Lenovo preloads
- Lenovo QuickLaunch to provide a simplified, customized version of Windows' Start menu
- Lenovo Solution Center to manage the ThinkVantage suite and certain system upkeep tasks on Windows 7 and 8
- Lenovo SimpleTap for Windows 7 to provide easy access to on-screen tiles on touch-enabled ThinkPads and tablets, as well as certain ThinkCentre systems with multi-touch screens

The Lenovo ThinkVantage Technologies that can also run on some other platforms are

- System Migration Assistant to transfer a user's personal data and environment between PC systems.
- Rescue and Recovery to deploy updates, recover from crashes, and provide remote access if the system will not boot or function while booted.

Legacy ThinkVantage software

- ImageUltra Builder to create distributable software structures
- Hardware Password Manager to save BIOS, disk, and motherboard passwords in one place

IBM developed ThinkVantage Technologies. They were included with the sale of their PC division to Lenovo Group in 2005.

== History ==
In 2002 IBM heavily promoted these tools as part of its "Think" campaign, intended to instill confidence that IBM computers were easier to use and quicker to recover from disaster.

In 2004 IBM provided two of the utilities, Rescue and Recovery with Rapid Restore and IBM System Migration Assistant as separately available software for use on non-IBM systems.
