= IdeaPad Y series =

Discontinued range of gaming laptops produced by Lenovo

IdeaPad Y Series
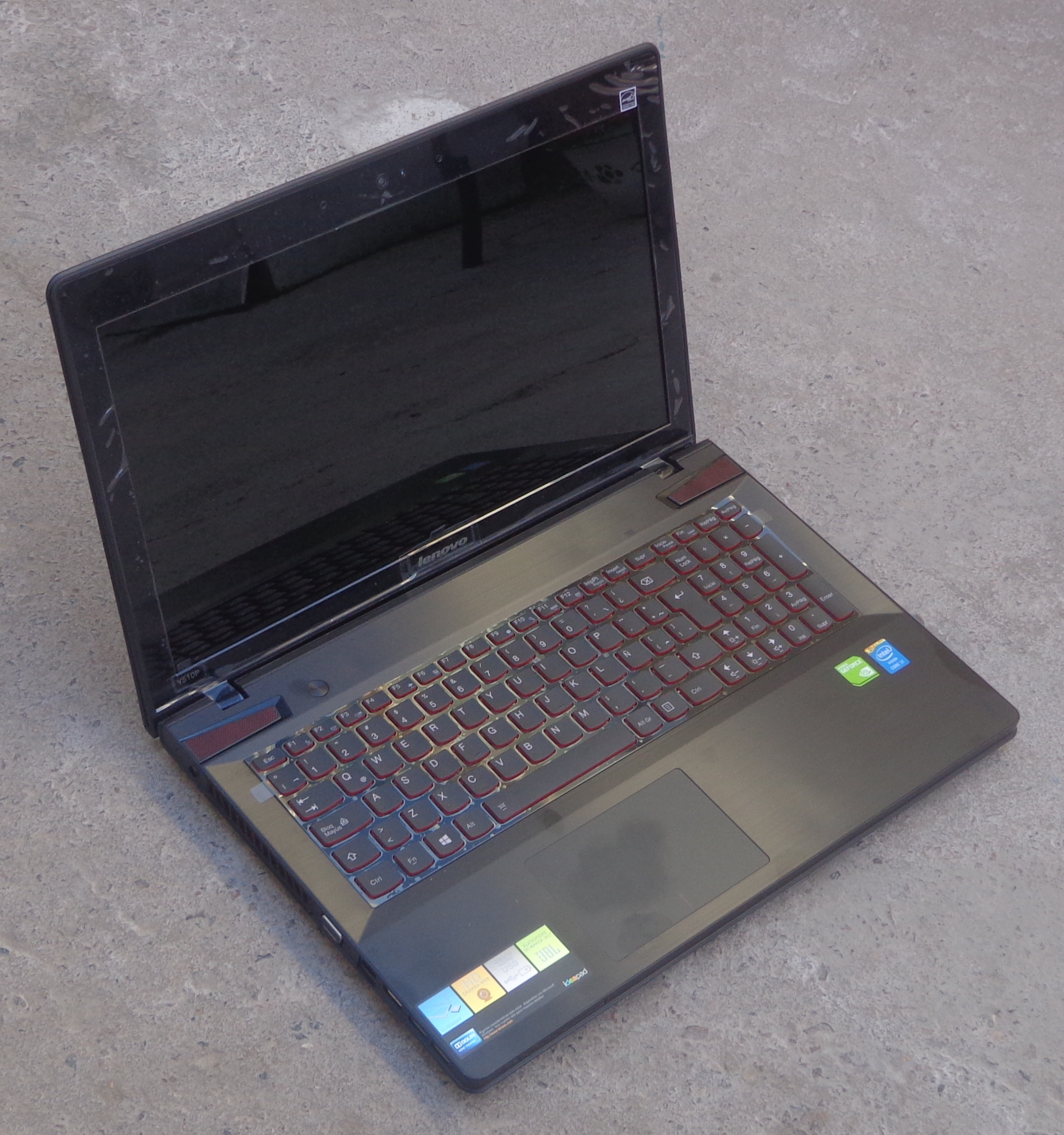
- 2013's IdeaPad Y510p
- Developer: Lenovo
- Manufacturer: Lenovo
- Product family: IdeaPad
- Type: laptop
- Released: 2008
- Discontinued: 2016
- Operating system: Microsoft Windows
- CPU: Intel Core
- Successor: Legion (as high-end); IdeaPad L series (as low-end).

The IdeaPad Y series is a discontinued consumer range of laptops produced by Lenovo first announced in 2008. They were marketed as premium high performance laptops for multimedia and gaming, as part of the IdeaPad line.

The most significant differences from Lenovo's traditional ThinkPad business laptops were a more consumer-oriented appearance and performance-oriented components. IdeaPads feature a chiclet keyboard with rounded keys. The first of the Y series were the IdeaPad Y710 and the IdeaPad Y510 notebooks, with screen sizes of 17 inches and 15 inches respectively.

The IdeaPad Y series was replaced by the Legion Y series in 2017.

== 2016 ==
=== Y900 ===
Lenovo IdeaPad Y900
- Also known as: IdeaPad Y900
- Developer: Lenovo
- Manufacturer: Lenovo
- Type: Notebook computer
- Released: 2016
- Media: 500GB 5400 RPM
- Operating system: Windows 10
- CPU: Intel Core i7
- Memory: 8GB DDR3; 16GB DDR4
- Storage: 500GB 5400 RPM/1TB
- Display: 17.3 in (44 cm)
- Graphics: NVIDIA® GTX 960M Graphics
- Sound: JBL
- Input: Keyboard
- Camera: Camera with integrated microphone ^{(Front-facing)}
- Touchpad: ClickPad
- Connectivity: 4-in-1 Card Reader (SD, SDHC, SDXC, MMC), headphone/microphone port, 2 USB 2.0 inputs, 1 DisplayPort, 1 HDMI output, 1 RJ-45 Ethernet Cable, 1 USB Type-C port, 2 SuperSpeed USB 3.0 inputs
- Dimensions: (inches) : 16.45" x 11.51" x 0.99" (mm) : 418 x 292.6 x 25.1
- Weight: 7.7 lb (3.5 kg) / 1.1” ( 27.95 mm)

Lenovo announced the IdeaPad Y900 in January 2016. It uses Intel Core Gen6 i7 processors that can be overclocked (Lenovo has included utility software to make this easier for users). The chassis is black aluminum with color accents. The keyboard is mechanical. Customizable color LEDs help the touchpad and various parts of the keyboard stand out more clearly in dark environments. The display is 17.3 inches, uses an IPS panel with an anti-glare coating, and resolution is 1920 × 1080 pixels. Up to 64 GiB of RAM is supported. Bays are included for two SSDs or hard drives with RAID 0 support. An Nvidia GeForce GTX 980M comes standard with options for either 4 GiB or 8 GiB of VRAM.

=== Y700 ===
Lenovo IdeaPad Y700
- Also known as: IdeaPad Y700
- Developer: Lenovo
- Manufacturer: Lenovo
- Type: Notebook computer
- Released: 2015
- Introductory price: $1,079.99- IdeaPad Y700 (14") $1,099.99— IdeaPad Y700 (15") $1,269.99- IdeaPad Y700 Touch (15") $1,299.99— IdeaPad Y700 (17")
- Discontinued: 2017
- Media: 500GB 5400 RPM
- Operating system: Windows 10
- CPU: Intel Core i3 Intel Core i5 Intel Core i7 6700HQ
- Memory: 8GB DDR3; 16GB DDR4
- Storage: 500GB 5400 RPM/1TB
- Display: 14.1 in (36 cm); 15.6 in (40 cm); 17.3 in (44 cm)
- Graphics: NVIDIA® GTX 960M Graphics
- Sound: JBL
- Input: Keyboard
- Camera: Camera with integrated microphone ^{(Front-facing)}
- Touchpad: ClickPad
- Connectivity: 2 SuperSpeed USB 3.0 inputs, 1 USB 2.0 input 1, 1 HDMI output, 1 RJ-45 Ethernet Cable input, 4-in-1 Card Reader (SD, SDHC, SDXC, MMC) and a headphone/microphone port
- Dimensions: (inches) : 16.45" x 11.51" x 0.99" (mm) : 418 x 292.6 x 25.1
- Weight: 4.8 lb (2.2 kg) / 1.02” (26 mm); 5.7 lb (2.6 kg) / 1.02” (25.95 mm); 7.7 lb (3.5 kg) / 1.1” ( 27.95 mm)

The Lenovo IdeaPad Y700 series was a class of gaming PCs. The IdeaPad Y700 series are respectively an 14-inch, 15-inch and 17-inch laptops designed specifically. Same as the IdeaPad 300, 110 and 330 series of home and office laptops, the IdeaPad Y700 series of gaming laptops along with Acer's Predator and Dell's Inspiron and G series gaming laptops. These model have three case versions with 14", 15" and 17" screens; they successor is a Legion Y720 model with similar cases.

== 2015 ==
=== Y50-70 ===
The Y50-70 was released in 2015 as an incremental upgrade to 2014's Y50.

=== Y70 ===
The Y70 is a gaming laptop with a 17-inch multitouch screen. As of February 2015, the Y70 base model had a 2.5 GHz Intel Core i5 processor, 8 GiB of RAM, a 1 TB SSD/HDD hybrid, and a 2 GiB Nvidia GTX 860M GPU. The display has 1080p resolution and LED backlighting. The Y70 scored 4.5 hours of battery life on MobileMark's Office Productivity Test but is only able to achieve a battery life of about 2.5 hours for gaming.

A review from Notebook Review said, "We're happy to recognize the Lenovo IdeaPad Y70 Touch with our Editor's Choice award for being a great large screen entertainment notebook."

== 2014 ==
There were two flagship laptops released in 2014 Lenovo Ideapad Y40, Y50 and Y70 Touch.

=== Y40 and Y50 ===
The Y40 and Y50 are respectively 14-inch and 15-inch laptops designed specifically for gaming. 1080p displays come standard on both models, but the Y50 has an option for a 4K display with a resolution of 3840 × 2160. Both come with options for multi-touch displays. Both have Intel Core i7 processors. The Y40 uses an AMD Radeon R9 M270 video card with 2 GiB of VRAM; The Y50 uses an Nvidia GeForce GTX 860M video card with options for 2 GiB and 4 GiB of VRAM. Later models now use the Nvidia GeForce GTX 960M video card. They come standard with 8 GiB of RAM (expandable up to 16 GiB). The Y40 comes standard with a 256 GB SSD and the Y50 comes standard with a 1 TB hybrid drive. Both are only 0.9 inches (23 mm) thick. They respectively weigh 4.85 lb (2.20 kg) and 5.68 lb (2.58 kg). Neither has an optical drive. The Y40 and Y50 were announced at the 2014 International CES in Las Vegas and went on sale in the United States in May of the same year.

In a review for PC World, Hayden Dingman wrote,

In terms of gaming performance, Lenovo's Y50 is one of the best laptops in its class. It's a great choice if you're looking for a portable gaming rig on a budget. Unfortunately, Lenovo compromised several key components—the keyboard, trackpad, and (most importantly) the display—in order to offer the Y50 at a mid-range price. Hook up a mouse, keyboard, and external display and you'll have a solid gaming machine. If you can't tolerate those compromises, you might have to bite the bullet and spend more money for a competitor's offering.

In a review for LAPTOP, Sherri L. Smith wrote,

Lenovo continues to impress me with its ability to offer gaming laptops at affordable prices. For $949, shoppers get a sleek-looking 14-inch notebook with solid overall performance and long battery life. However, while the AMD Radeon R9 M275 GPU isn't a lightweight, you won't be fragging or questing at the maximum settings. I also wish the notebook featured a better display and keyboard.

=== Y40 ===
Lenovo IdeaPad Y40 was announced in the US on January 5, 2014.

- Processor: Up to 5th Gen Intel Core i7
- Memory: Up to 16 GiB DDR3L
- Graphics: Up to AMD Radeon M275
- Storage: Up to 1 TB HDD or 1 TB + 8 GB hybrid SSHD
- Battery: Up to 5 hours' battery life
- Display: 14.1" 1920 × 1080 LED-backlit TN LCD
- Operating system: Microsoft Windows 8.1
- Weight: Starting at 2.2 kg (4.9 lb)
- Wireless: Bluetooth 4.02, IEEE 802.11a/b/g/n or 802.11ac Wi-Fi
- Ports: 2 × USB 3.0, 1 × USB 2.0, Audio Combo Jack (headphone and mic), HDMI-out, 4-in-1 (SD / MMC / SDXC / SDHC) card reader, RJ-45 Gigabit Ethernet, S/PDIF

=== Y50 ===
Lenovo IdeaPad Y50 was released in the second quarter of 2014.

- Processor: 4th Gen Intel Core i7-4710HQ (2.5 GHz 1600 MT/s 6 MiB)
- Memory: up to 16 GiB PC3-12800 DDR3L SDRAM 1600 MT/s
- Storage: 256 or 512 GB SSD, or 500 GB/1 TB 5400 RPM + 8 GB hybrid SSHD; Optical drive: External BD/DVD
- Graphics: NVIDIA GeForce GTX 860M (2 GiB or 4 GiB GDDR5)
- Display: 15.6" LED-backlit LCD (3840 × 2160, 1920 × 1080, or 1920 × 1080 multitouch)
- Operating system: Microsoft Windows 8.1
- Weight: 2.4 kg (5.3 lb)
- Keyboard: Backlit AccuType keyboard
- Media: 720p Camera, JBL 2.1 speakers with Dolby Advanced Audio V2
- Battery: Up to 5 hours Wi-Fi browsing depending on configuration
- Wireless: Bluetooth 4.02, IEEE 802.11a/b/g/n or 802.11ac Wi-Fi
- Ports: 2 × USB 3.0, 1 × USB 2.0, Audio Combo Jack (headphone and mic), HDMI-out, 4-in-1 (SD / MMC / SDXC / SDHC) card reader, RJ45 Gigabit Ethernet, S/PDIF

In 2015, some components were updated with more recent or parts of higher quality:

- IPS LCD panel display instead of TN LCD panel
- Intel Core i7-4720HQ instead of i7-4710HQ
- NVIDIA GeForce GTX 960M instead of GTX 860M

== 2013 ==
=== Y400 ===
The IdeaPad Y400 was announced at the IFA 2012 show in Berlin, Germany. This laptop features a 14-inch display with 1366x768 resolution. It was configured with Intel Core i7 third-generation processor and up to 16 GB of RAM. These laptops included the new "Intelligent Touchpad" that was optimized for Windows 8 operating system. The Y400 weight was around 5.51 pounds with a 6-cell battery.

=== Y410p ===
The IdeaPad Y410p was released around June 2013. This laptop also features a fourth-generation Haswell Intel Core i7 processor. The Y410p is comparable to higher end laptops such as the Alienware M14x, but this series starts at a comparatively lower price of $799. The Y410p also comes with an UltraBay, which can house a second dedicated graphics card, a hard drive or an exhaust fan; and uses the secure boot UEFI protocol.

Specifications:

- Processor: up to 4th generation Intel Core i7-4700MQ (2.4 GHz Quad)
- Memory: up to 8 GiB (DDR3 1600 MT/s)
- Graphics: Intel HD 4600 + NVIDIA GeForce GT755M 2 GiB GDDR5 soldered graphics (and optional UltraBay GPU)
- Operating system: Microsoft Windows 8.1
- Display: 14.1" 1366 × 768 or 1600 × 900 LED-backlit TN LCD

=== Y500 ===
The IdeaPad Y500 was released in the first week of January 2013, after Lenovo announced it in late 2012. The Y500 is a modular laptop, where the BD/DVD drive could be switched out for adding another Graphics card, another hard drive, or another exhaust fan with new feature called Always-On USB, a port which will ensure that even when your system is switched off and unplugged from the mains, you will be able to charge your mobile phone or any other compatible USB device. Y500 Specifications:

- Processor: 3rd Generation Intel Core i7-3630QM (2.4 GHz Quad)
- Memory: up to 16 GiB (DDR3 1600 MT/s)
- Graphics: Intel HD 4000 + NVIDIA GeForce GT 650M (2 GiB GDDR5) soldered
- Operating system: Microsoft Windows 8
- Display: 15.6" 1920 × 1080 LED-backlit TN LCD
- Audio: Premium JBL speakers with Dolby Home Theater v4 sound enhancement

A new version of the Y500 with upgraded features was released in June along with the Lenovo Y410p. The upgraded version has following features compare to older version

- Display: 1366 × 768 TN (1920 × 1080 was present in older version)
- Graphics: Intel HD 4600 + NVIDIA GeForce GT 750M (NVIDIA GeForce GT 650M was in older version)
- Memory: Up to 8 GiB DDR3 (16 GiB in older version)

=== Y510p ===
The IdeaPad Y510p was released around June 2013. This laptop features a fourth-generation Haswell Intel Core i7 processor. The Y510p also comes with an ultrabay, which can house a second dedicated graphics card, a hard drive or an exhaust fan; and uses the secure boot UEFI protocol.

Specifications:

- Processor: 4th Generation Intel Core i7-4700MQ (Quad Core 2.4 GHz)
- Memory: Up to 16 GiB (DDR3 1600 MT/s)
- Graphics: NVIDIA GeForce GT 755M (2 GiB GDDR5) GPU, and optional secondary NVIDIA GeForce GT 750M (update GeForce GT 755M) as a UltraBay graphics card
- Display: 15.6" 1920 × 1080 LED-backlit TN LCD
- Audio: JBL designed speakers supporting Dolby Home Theatre v4
- Ports: 1 × USB 2.0 (always-on), 2 × USB 3.0, 6-in-1 card reader (SD, SDHC, SDXC, MMC, MS, MS-Pro), headphone, microphone, HDMI, VGA.
- Operating system: Microsoft Windows 8.0 (can be upgraded to 8.1)

== 2012 ==
The IdeaPad Y-series laptops released by Lenovo in mid-2012 were the Y480 and Y580. Lenovo followed them up towards the end of the year with the Y400 and the Y500 which had almost similar specifications. The main difference is that the Y400 and Y500 have an ultrabay slot which can be swapped for another hard drive, another fan or another GPU which will work in SLI with the already integrated one to increase performance drastically.

=== Y480 ===
The Y480 was released in 2012 with the following specifications:

- Processor: Intel 3rd Generation Core i5/i7
  - i7-3630QM (Quad-core 2.4 GHz, 6 MiB L3 cache)
  - i7-3610QM (Quad-core 2.3 GHz, 6 MiB L3 cache)
  - i5-3210M (Dual-core 2.4 GHz, 6 MiB L3 cache)
- Memory: 8 GB DDR3 1600 MT/s
- Graphics:
  - NVIDIA GeForce GT 640M LE (96 Fermi cores, 2 GiB GDDR5 VRAM)
  - NVIDIA GeForce GT 650M (384 Kepler cores, 2 GiB GDDR5 VRAM)
- Display: 14.0" 1366 × 768 (16∶9) LED-backlit TN LCD
- Storage:
  - 1 × 2.5" SATA drive bay:
    - 5400 RPM HDD (500, 750 GB, or 1 TB)
  - 1 × mSATA with 32 GB SSD
- Dimensions: 345 × 239 × 20–32.8 mm (13.58 × 9.4 × 0.8–1.3 in)
- Weight: 2.20 kg (4.85 lb)
- Operating system: Microsoft Windows 7 Home Premium

=== Y580 ===
The Y580 was released in late 2012 with the following specifications:

- Processor: Intel 3rd Generation Core i5/i7
  - i7-3630QM (Quad-core 2.4 GHz, 6 MiB L3 cache)
  - i7-3610QM (Quad-core 2.3 GHz, 6 MiB L3 cache)
  - i5-3210M (Dual-core 2.4 GHz, 6 MiB L3 cache)
- Memory: 8 or 16 GB DDR3 1600 MT/s (2 slots)
- Graphics: NVIDIA GeForce GTX 660M (384 Kepler cores, 2 GiB GDDR5 VRAM)
- Display: 15.6" 16∶9 LED-backlit TN LCD, 1366 × 768 or 1920 × 1080
- Storage:
  - 1 × 2.5" SATA drive bay:
    - 5400 RPM HDD (500, 750 GB, or 1 TB) or
    - 7200 RPM HDD (500 GB)
  - 1 × mSATA with 32 GB SSD
- Dimensions: 385 × 255 × 35.7 mm (15.16 × 10 × 1.4 in)
- Weight: 2.79 kg (6.15 lb)
- Operating system: Microsoft Windows 7 (Home Premium) or Windows 8

== 2011 ==
The IdeaPad Y-series laptops released by Lenovo in 2011 were the Y470 and Y570.

=== Y470 ===
The Y470 was released in 2011 with the following specifications:

- Processor: Intel 2nd Generation Core i3/i5/i7
  - Quad-core:
    - i7-2720QM (2.2 GHz, 6 MiB L3 cache)
    - i7-2630QM (2.0 GHz, 6 MiB L3 cache)
  - Dual-core:
    - i7-2620M (2.7 GHz, 4 MiB L3 cache)
    - i5-2540M (2.6 GHz, 3 MiB L3 cache)
    - i5-2520M (2.5 GHz, 3 MiB L3 cache)
    - i5-2410M (2.3 GHz, 3 MiB L3 cache)
    - i3-2310M (2.1 GHz, 3 MiB L3 cache)
- RAM: Up to 8 GiB DDR3 (1066/1333 MT/s)
- Display: 14" 1366 × 768 (16∶9) TN LCD
- Graphics: Intel HD 3000 + NVIDIA GeForce 550M (1 or 2 GiB VRAM)
- Storage:
  - 1 × 2.5" SATA drive bay:
    - 5400 RPM HDD (250, 320, 500, 640, 750 GB, or 1 TB)
    - 7200 RPM HDD (320, 500, 750 GB, or 1 TB)
  - 1 × mSATA socket:
    - 32 or 64 GB mSATA SSD
- Weight: 2.20 kg (4.85 lb)
- Dimensions: 345 × 239 × 20–32.8 mm (13.58 × 9.4 × 0.8–1.3 in)
- Operating system: Microsoft Windows 7 (Professional or Home Premium)

=== Y570 ===
The Y570 was released in 2011 with the following specifications:

- Processor: Intel 2nd Generation Core i3/i5/i7
  - Quad-core:
    - i7-2920XM (2.5 GHz, 8 MiB L3 cache)
    - i7-2820QM (2.3 GHz, 8 MiB L3 cache)
    - i7-2720QM (2.2 GHz, 6 MiB L3 cache)
    - i7-2630QM (2.0 GHz, 6 MiB L3 cache)
  - Dual-core:
    - i7-2620M (2.7 GHz, 4 MiB L3 cache)
    - i5-2540M (2.6 GHz, 3 MiB L3 cache)
    - i5-2520M (2.5 GHz, 3 MiB L3 cache)
    - i5-2430M (2.4 GHz, 3 MiB L3 cache)
    - i5-2410M (2.3 GHz, 3 MiB L3 cache)
    - i3-2310M (2.1 GHz, 3 MiB L3 cache)
- Memory: Up to 8 GB DDR3 (1066/1333 MT/s)
- Graphics: Intel HD 3000 + NVIDIA GeForce 555M (1 GiB or 2 GiB VRAM)
- Display: 15.6" 1366 × 768 (16∶9) TN LCD
- Storage:
  - 1 × 2.5" SATA drive bay
    - 5400 RPM HDD (250, 320, 500, 640, 750 GB, or 1 TB)
    - 7200 RPM HDD (320, 500, 750 GB, or 1 TB)
  - 1 × mSATA socket
    - 32 or 64 GB mSATA SSD
- Weight: 2.70 kg (5.95 lb)
- Dimensions: 385 × 255 × 22–35.7 mm (15.2 × 10 × 0.87–1.4 in)
- Operating system: Microsoft Windows 7 (Professional, or Home Premium, or Home Basic)

== 2010 ==
The IdeaPad Y-series laptops released in 2010 by Lenovo were the Y460, Y460p, Y730, Y560p, and Y560d.

=== Y460 and Y460p ===
Released in 2010, the IdeaPad Y460 offered the following specifications:
- Processor: Intel Core i5 520M
- Display: 14" 1366 × 768 LED-backlit TN LCD
- Memory: 4 GiB DDR3 1066 MT/s RAM
- Graphics: Intel GMA HD + ATI Mobility Radeon HD 5650 (1 GiB VRAM)
- Storage: SATA 500 GB 5400 RPM
- Weight: 2.26 kg (4.98 lb)
- Dimensions: 13.4 in × 0.79 in–1.3 in × 9.25 in (340 mm × 20 mm–33 mm × 235 mm)
Whereas the Y460p laptop was released in 2010 with the following specifications:
- Processor: Up to Intel Core i7-2630QM
- Memory: Up to 8 GB DDR3 1333 MT/s
- Graphics: Intel GMA HD + AMD Radeon HD 6550M
- Weight: 2.20 kg (4.85 lb)
- Dimensions: 13.4 in × 9.25 in × 0.78 in–1.33 in (340 mm × 235 mm × 20 mm–34 mm)

Notebook Review noted that the Y460 offered "great gaming performance", although the system heated up considerably while gaming. The battery life and design were also praised, with the reviewer stating that there was a "huge improvement in the looks department". LAPTOP Magazine offered a similar opinion, stating that, "Lenovo delivers multimedia and gaming power in a portable design, complete with a one-of-a-kind navigation control".

=== Y560d, Y560 and Y560p ===
The Y560d laptop was released in 2010 with the following specifications:
- Processor: Up to Intel Core i7-720QM
- Memory: Up to 8 GB DDR3 1333 MT/s
- Graphics: ATI Mobility Radeon HD 5730
- Weight: 2.70 kg (5.95 lb)
- Dimensions: 385 mm × 255 mm × 20 mm–33 mm (15.15 in × 10.03 in × 0.78 in–1.29 in)
The Y560 laptop was also released in 2010 with the following specifications:
- Processor: Up to Intel Core i7-740QM
- Memory: Up to 8 GB DDR3 1333 MT/s
- Graphics: ATI Mobility Radeon HD 5730
- Weight: 2.70 kg (5.95 lb)
- Dimensions: 385 mm × 255 mm × 20 mm–33 mm (15.15 in × 10.03 in × 0.78 in–1.29 in)
The Y560p laptop was released in 2010 with the following specifications:
- Processor: Up to Intel Core i7-2630QM
- Memory: Up to 8 GB DDR3 1333 MT/s
- Graphics: AMD Radeon HD 6570M
- Weight: 2.70 kg (5.95 lb)
- Dimensions: 385 mm × 255 mm × 20 mm–33 mm (15.15 in × 10.03 in × 0.78 in–1.29 in)

=== Y730 ===
The Y730 laptop was released as an update to the Y710 laptop, with the most significant differences being a chipset update to Intel PM45 and the ability to use DDR3 memory. The laptop offered:

- Processor: Intel Core 2 X9100 (3.06 GHz)
- RAM: 3 GB DDR3
- Graphics: ATI Radeon HD 3650 XT
- Display: 17" TN LCD
- Storage: SATA, Up to 500 GB HDD

Reviewers disagreed on its capacity for gaming. About.com indicated that it was not very fast for high resolution PC gaming, suggesting that it was better suited for casual gamers and viewing HD videos. The screen was also indicated as being a lower resolution than industry standard. On the other hand, the reviewer at GADGETBASE was extremely enthusiastic about the laptop, calling it "the ultimate notebook" with "stellar performance" for "a die-hard gamer".

== 2009 ==
The Y-series laptops launched in 2009 by Lenovo were the Y450 and Y550.

=== Y450 ===
The successor to the Y430, the Y450 laptop offered the following specifications:

- Processor: Intel Core 2 Duo T6400
- Display: 14" 1366 × 768 LED-backlit TN LCD
- Memory: Up to 3 GiB DDR3 1066 MT/s
- Graphics: Intel GMA 4500MHD (integrated)
- Storage: Up to 250 GB 5400 RPM SATA
- Wireless: Intel Wireless Wi-Fi Link 5100; Bluetooth Version 2.0 + EDR
- Weight: 2.1 kg (4.6 lb)
- Dimensions: 340 mm × 231 mm × 36 mm (13.4 in × 9.1 in × 1.4 in)
- Operating System: Microsoft Windows 7 Home Premium 32-bit or 64-bit

PC World gave the laptop a rating of 2.5 of 5 stars, praising the keyboard, design, and overall value. The negative points were indicated as being an uneven vertical viewing angle.

=== Y550 ===
Released in 2009, the IdeaPad Y550 laptop offered the following specifications:

- Processor: 2.0 GHz Intel Core 2 Duo T6400
- Memory: Up to 8 GB DDR3
- Storage: Up to 320 GB SATA
- Display: 15.6 in (40 cm) 1366 × 768 LED-backlit TN LCD
- Graphics: Intel X4500MHD (integrated)
- Weight: 2.3 kg (5 lb)
- Dimensions: 386 mm × 254 mm × 26 mm–38 mm (15.2 in × 10.0 in × 1.02 in–1.5 in)

Notebook Review called the IdeaPad Y550 laptop well-built, with a wide array of options. The design was also appreciated and as with previous IdeaPad Y Series laptops, both the keyboard and touchpad were positively received.

== 2008 ==
The Y Series laptops launched in 2008 by Lenovo were the Y710, Y510, Y530, and Y430.

=== Y430 ===
The IdeaPad Y430 featured a 14.1 inch screen, an Intel Core 2 Duo T5800 processor, Intel GMA 4500MHD graphics, and weighed 5.3 lb (2.4 kg). PC World was enthusiastic in its review of the Y430 notebook, calling it "among the best midsized laptops available" and "a joy to use". Summing up the notebook's capabilities, PC World said, "This is a solidly built unit that's a joy to use and has plenty of grunt for most applications. It also has versatile networking options, including the ability to connect to 5 GHz IEEE 802.11n Wi-Fi routers."

=== Y510 ===
The Y510 notebook offered the following specifications:

- Processor: Intel Core 2 Duo T2330, T5450, or T5550
- Memory: Up to 4 GiB
- Graphics: Intel X3100 (integrated, up to 256 MiB shared video RAM)
- Display: 15.4" 1280 × 800 TN LCD
- Storage: Up to 250 GB SATA HDD
- Optical drive: DVD burner
- Battery: 6-cell battery, up to 4 hours of life
- Weight: 2.9 kg (6.4 lb)
- Dimensions: 358 mm × 262 mm × 29 mm–36 mm (14.1 in × 10.3 in × 1.14 in–1.42 in)
- Operating system: Microsoft Windows Vista Home Premium (32-bit)

=== Y530 ===
The Y530 notebook was the successor to the Y510, with the same chassis but with an upgrade to the Intel Centrino 2 processor. While the notebook was slightly thicker than other, similar laptops, it was still portable and easy to carry around. The notebook weighed 3.0 kg (6.6 lb) and had a form factor of 361 mm × 262 mm × 36 mm (14.2 in × 10.3 in × 1.4 in).

Notebook Review stated that the positive points of the Y530 notebook were the build quality, the speaker system, and the comfortable keyboard and touchpad. The negative points were the NVIDIA 9300M graphics card, and the highly reflective display.

=== Y710 ===
The first type of Y-series laptops was the Y7xx models, including the Y710 and Y730. The Y710 have an optional "Lenovo Game Zone" module (factory mounted in a keypad module space) and offered the following specifications:

- Processor: Intel Core 2 Duo T5450, T8100 or T9300
- Memory: Up to 8 GiB DDR2
- Graphics: ATI Mobility Radeon HD 2600 (256 MiB VRAM)
- Display: 17" 1440 × 900 (16∶10) TN LCD
- Storage: Up to 100 GB SATA HDD
- Optical drive: DVD burner or Blu-ray
- Battery: 6-cell battery, up to 4 hours
- Weight: 3.6 kg (7.9 lb)
- Dimensions: 394 mm × 284 mm × 26 mm–38 mm (15.5 in × 11.2 in × 1.02 in–1.5 in)
- Operating system: Microsoft Windows Vista Home Premium (32-bit)
