= Legion Phone Duel 2 =

Mobile phone introduced in April 2021

Lenovo Legion Duel 2
- Brand: Lenovo
- Manufacturer: Lenovo
- Type: Phablet
- Series: Lenovo Legion
- First released: April 8, 2021
- Predecessor: Legion Duel
- Successor: Lenovo Legion Y90
- Compatible networks: 4G and 5G
- Form factor: Slate
- Dimensions: 176 mm × 78.5 mm × 9.9 mm (6.93 in × 3.09 in × 0.39 in)
- Weight: 259 g (9.1 oz)
- Operating system: Legion OS/ZUI 12.5 (based on Android 11)
- System-on-chip: Qualcomm Snapdragon 888
- CPU: Octa-core (1x2.84 GHz Kryo 680 & 3x2.42 GHz Kryo 680 & 4x1.8 GHz Kryo 680)
- GPU: Qualcomm Adreno 660
- Memory: 12 or 16 GB LPDDR5 RAM
- Storage: 256 or 512 GB UFS 3.1
- Removable storage: None
- Battery: 5500 mAh
- Charging: 65 W (single USB-C port); 90 W (dual USB-C ports)
- Rear camera: 64 MP, f/1.9, 25 mm, 1/1.32", 1.0 μm (wide) + 16 MP, f/2.2, 16 mm (ultrawide); PDAF, gyro-EIS, dual-LED dual-tone flash, panorama, HDR, 8K@24 fps, 4K@60 fps, 1080p@30/60/240 fps
- Front camera: 44 MP, f/2.0, 24mm, 1/2.65", 1.0 μm LED flash, HDR; 4K@30/60 fps, 1080p@30/60/120 fps
- Display: AMOLED capacitive touchscreen with HDR10+ support 6.92 in (176 mm) 2460 × 1080 1080p, (388 ppi with 20.5:9 aspect ratio), 144 Hz refresh rate, 16M colors
- Sound: DiracAudio stereo speakers
- Connectivity: Bluetooth 5.2; Wi-Fi a/b/g/n/ac/6; A2DP, LE, aptX HD, aptX Adaptive
- Data inputs: Fingerprint scanner (optical); Accelerometer; Gyroscope; Proximity sensor; Electronic compass
- Other: Intake and exhaust fans for main vapor chamber

The Lenovo Legion Duel 2, known as the Lenovo Legion 2 Pro in China, is an Android gaming smartphone that was released on April 8, 2021.

== Design ==
The phone features a bump on the back which houses the camera assembly, flash, and dual fans that cool the Qualcomm Snapdragon 888 system-on-a-chip. This bump has been shown to be a weakness. The phone contains dual USB Type C connectors that are used to charge the 5500 mAh battery. The phone comes in both black and white color variations.
