= Lenovo Legion =

Line of gaming computers by Lenovo

Legion
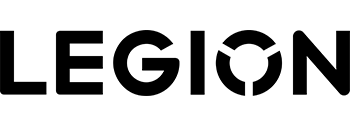

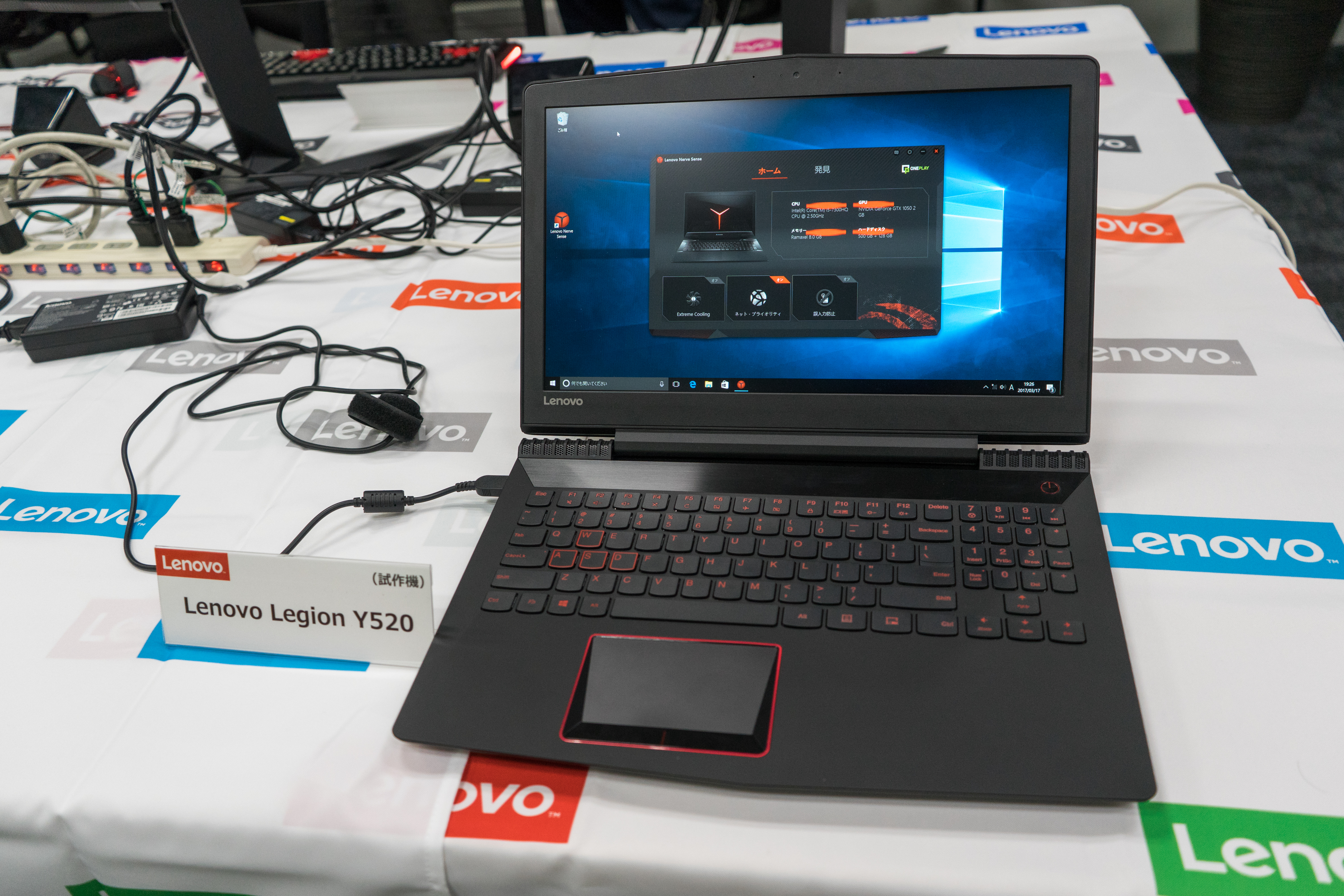
- Lenovo Legion Y520, one of the series' first models (2017)
- Developer: Lenovo (2017–present)
- Manufacturer: Lenovo
- Type: Laptop, Desktop, Tablet, Smartphone, Handheld Gaming Computer
- Released: June 6, 2017; 9 years ago
- Operating system: Windows, Android
- CPU: AMD, Intel, Qualcomm
- Display: Up to 16"
- Graphics: AMD, Nvidia
- Marketing target: Gaming
- Predecessor: IdeaPad Y series and IdeaCentre Y series
- Related: LOQ
- Website: Legion

Lenovo Legion is a line of consumer-oriented gaming laptops, desktop computers, smartphones, and tablet computers designed, developed and marketed by Lenovo, targeting gaming performance. The first Legion brand laptops, the Legion Y520 and the Legion Y720, were revealed at the CES 2017 trade show and succeeded the IdeaPad Y series. On June 6, 2017, a high-performance model, the Legion Y920, equipped with Intel's seventh-generation quad-core i7-7820HK and Nvidia GTX 1070 discrete graphics, was launched.

The line is positioned above LOQ and currently competes against other high-end gaming PCs such as HP's Omen, Acer's Predator, Asus' ROG and Dell's Alienware subsidiary.

At the Electronic Entertainment Expo 2018 (E3 2018), Lenovo announced three new laptops with new redesigned chassis, Y530, Y730 and Y7000.

In 2019, Lenovo introduced the Legion Y540, Y740 with the new GeForce 20 series.

In 2020, Lenovo launched the Legion 5 and 7 laptops.

In September 2023, Lenovo introduced their new top-of-the-line flagship model, the Legion 9i, with the first-ever self-contained liquid-cooling system inside a laptop.

== Models ==
This table lists all the existing models, their availability depends on the country.

=== Laptops ===
Model	Release date	Processor (CPU)	Graphics (GPU)	Memory (RAM)	Storage	Audio	Screen	Networking	Battery	Charger	Dimensions	Weight	Operating System
Legion Y520	2017	Intel Core i7-7700HQ	Nvidia GeForce GTX Series: GTX 1050 Ti; GTX 1060	2 x SODIMM Slots			15.6" FHD (1920 x 1080); 16:9; IPS; Anti-Glare	1 x 1 Wi-Fi 802.11 ac; 2 x 2 Wi-Fi 802.11 ac	45 Wh		380 x 265 x 25.8 mm (14.96 x 10.43 x 1.01 in)	2.4 kg/5.3 lb	Windows 10
Legion Y720	2017	Intel Core i7-7700HQ	Nvidia GeForce GTX 1060 6 GB	2 x SODIMM Slots		JBL speakers with chamber, subwoofer and Digital Array Microphone	15.6 inch, 16:9 FHD; 15.6 inch, 16:9 UHD	Yes	60 Wh	170 W	380 x 277 x 29 mm (14.96 x 10.9 x 1.14")	3.2 kg/7.05 lb	
Legion Y920	2017	7th Gen Intel Core: i7-7700HQ; i7-7820HK	Nvidia GeForce GTX 1070 8 GB	4 x SODIMM Slots			17.3 inch, FHD IPS 300 nits		90 Wh	230 W	(mm) : 425 x 315 x 36; (inches) : 16.73" x 12.4" x 1.42"	4.3 kg/9.5 lb	
Legion Y530	2018	8th Gen Intel Core: i5-8300H; i7-8750H	Nvidia GeForce GTX Series: GTX 1050; GTX 1050 Ti; GTX 1060	2 x SODIMM Slots DDR4 (2.666 MHz)			15.6" FHD (1920 x 1080) IPS 144 Hz G-SYNC; 15.6" FHD (1920 x 1080) IPS 60 Hz G-SYNC	Wi-Fi 2x2 ac + Bluetooth 4.2; Wi-Fi 1x1 ac + Bluetooth 5.0	52.5 Wh		365 × 260 × 24.2 mm (14.37 × 10.24 × 0.95")	2.3 kg/5.07 lb	
Legion Y730	2018	8th Gen Intel Core: i5-8300H; i7-8750H	Nvidia GeForce GTX 1050 Ti	2 x SODIMM Slots DDR4 (2.666 MHz)			15.6" FHD (1920 x 1080) IPS 144 Hz G-SYNC; 15.6" FHD (1920 x 1080) IPS 60 Hz G-SYNC	Wi-Fi 2x2 ac + Bluetooth 4.2; Wi-Fi 1x1 ac + Bluetooth 5.0	57 Wh		362 × 267 mm × 19.95 mm	2.2 kg/4.8 lb	
Legion Y7000	2018	9th Gen Intel Core: i5-9300HF; i7-8750H; i7-9750H	Nvidia GeForce: GTX 1060 Mobile; GTX 1650 Mobile; GTX 1660 Ti Mobile	2 x SODIMM Slots			15,6" FHD (1 920 x 1 080) IPS 144 Hz 300 nits; 15,6" FHD (1 920 x 1 080) IPS 60 Hz 300 nits; 15,6" FHD (1 920 x 1 080) IPS 60 Hz 250 nits	Wi-Fi 802.11ac; Bluetooth 4.2	57 Wh		36.0 cm × 26.7 cm × 2.39-2.56 cm	2.3 kg/5.1 lbs	
Legion Y540	2019	9th Gen Intel Core: i5-9300H; i7-9750H	Nvidia GeForce: RTX 2060; GTX 1660 Ti; GTX 1650; GTX 1050 3G	2 x SODIMM Slots			15.6” FHD (1920 x 1080), IPS, 60 Hz, 144 Hz, 300 nits	2 × 2 802.11 ac + Bluetooth 5.0; 1 × 1 802.11 ac + Bluetooth 4.2	52.5 Wh		14.4″ x 10.2″ x 1.02″ 365 mm × 260 mm × 25.9 mm	2.3 kg/5.1 lbs	
Legion Y740	2019	8th & 9th Gen Intel Core H Series: i5-8300H; i7-8750H; i5-9300H; i7-9750H	Nvidia GeForce RTX Series: RTX 2080 Max-Q; RTX 2070 Max-Q; RTX 2060; GTX 1660 Ti	2 x SODIMM Slots			15.6" FHD IPS, G-SYNC 500 nits, 144 Hz; 17.3" FHD IPS, G-SYNC 300 nits, 144 Hz	2 × 2 802.11 ac + Bluetooth 5.0; 1 × 1 802.11 ac + Bluetooth 4.2	57 Wh 76 Wh		14.2” x 10.5” x 0.88” 361.42 x 267 x 22.45 (mm)	2.2 kg/4.8 lb	
Legion 5 15 (Gen 5)	2020	AMD Ryzen 4000 Series: Ryzen 5 4600H; Ryzen 7 4800H	Nvidia GeForce: GTX 1650; GTX 1650Ti; GTX 1660Ti; RTX 2060	2 x SODIMM Slots Up to 64 GB DDR4 (3,200 MHz) Up to 32 GB LPDDR4			15,6" WQHD 144 Hz 300 nits (non HDR) 3 ms; 15,6" Full HD IPS 300 nits 144 Hz 5 ms; 15,6" Full HD IPS 300 nits 60 Hz; 15,6" Full HD IPS 250 nits 120 Hz	Intel AX200; Realtek RTL8852AE	60-80 Wh	170 W	2.25 à 2.575 cm × 36.256 cm × 26.061 cm	2.3 kg/5.07 lbs	
Legion 5 17	2020	AMD Ryzen 4000 Series: Ryzen 5 4600H; Ryzen 7 4800H	Nvidia GeForce: GTX 1660 Ti; RTX 2060	2 x SODIMM Slots Up to 64 GB DDR4 (3,200 MHz) Up to 32 GB LPDDR4			17.3" FHD (1920 x 1080) IPS, 300 nits, 144 Hz; 17.3" FHD (1920 x 1080) IPS, 300 nits, 60 Hz	Intel AX200; Realtek RTL8852AE	60-80 Wh		2.7 cm × 39.9 cm × 29.0 cm	2.98 kg	
Legion 5i 17	2020	10th Gen Intel Core: i7-10750H; i7-10875H	Nvidia GeForce: GTX 1660 Ti; RTX 2060	2 x SODIMM Slots Up to 64 GB DDR4 (3,200 MHz) Up to 32 GB LPDDR4			17.3" FHD (1920 x 1080) IPS, 300 nits, 144 Hz; 17.3" FHD (1920 x 1080) IPS, 300 nits, 60 Hz	Intel AX200; Realtek RTL8852AE	60-80 Wh		2.7 cm × 39.9 cm × 29.0 cm	2.98 kg/6.57 lbs	
Legion 5 15 (Gen 6)	2021	AMD Ryzen 5000 Series: Ryzen 7 5600H; Ryzen 5 5800H	Nvidia GeForce RTX Series: RTX 3060; RTX 3070	2 x SODIMM Slots Up to 64 GB DDR4 (3,200 MHz) Up to 32 GB LPDDR4			15,6" Full HD IPS 300 nits 165 Hz	Intel AX200; Realtek RTL8852AE	60-80 Wh	Options: 300 W; 230 W	36.3 cm × 26.0 cm × 2.613 cm	2.3 kg/5.07 lbs	
Legion 5i Pro (Gen 6)	2021	11th Gen Intel Core: i5-11400H; i7-11800H	Nvidia GeForce RTX Series: RTX 3050 (95 W); RTX 3050 ti (95 W); RTX 3060 (130 W); RTX 3070 (140 W)	2 x SODIMM Slots Up to 64 GB DDR4 (3,200 MHz) Up to 32 GB LPDDR4			16" WQXGA (2560×1600), IPS 500nits matte 165 Hz, 100% sRGB Dolby Vision, HDR 400 Free-Sync G-Sync; 16" FHD (1920×1080), Free-Sync G-Sync	Intel AX200; Realtek RTL8852AE	60-80 Wh	Options: 230 W; 300 W	356 x 260.4-264.4 x 21.7-26.85 mm (14.02 x 10.25-10.41 x 0.85-1.07 inches)	~2.45 kg / 5.4 lbs	
Legion 5 Pro (Gen 6)	2021	AMD Ryzen 5000 Series: Ryzen 5 5600H; Ryzen 7 5800H	Nvidia GeForce RTX Series: RTX 3050 (95 W); RTX 3050 ti (95 W); RTX 3060 (130 W); RTX 3070 (140 W)	2 x SODIMM Slots Up to 64 GB DDR4 (3,200 MHz) Up to 32 GB LPDDR4			16" WQXGA (2560×1600), IPS 500nits matte 165 Hz, 100% sRGB Dolby Vision, HDR 400 Free-Sync G-Sync; 16" FHD (1920×1080), Free-Sync G-Sync	Intel AX200; Realtek RTL8852AE	60-80 Wh	Options: 230 W; 300 W	356 x 260.4-264.4 x 21.7-26.85 mm (14.02 x 10.25-10.41 x 0.85-1.07 inches)	~2.45 kg / 5.4 lbs	
Legion 7i (Gen 6)	2021	11th Gen Intel Core: i5-11400H; i7-11800H; i9-11980HK	Nvidia GeForce RTX Series: RTX 3060 (130 W); RTX 3070 (140 W); RTX 3080 (165 W)	2 x SODIMM Slots Up to 64 GB DDR4 (3,200 MHz) Up to 32 GB LPDDR4			16" WQXGA (2560×1600), IPS 500nits matte 165 Hz, 100% sRGB Dolby Vision, HDR 400 Free-Sync G-Sync; 16" FHD (1920×1080), Free-Sync G-Sync	Intel Killer AX1650	60-80 Wh	Options: 300 W	356 x 260 x 20.1-23.5 mm (14.02 x 10.23 x 0.79-0.93 inches)	2.5 kg/5.5 lbs	
Legion 7 (Gen 6)	2021	AMD Ryzen 5000 Series: Ryzen 5 5600H; Ryzen 7 5800H; Ryzen 9 5900HX	Nvidia GeForce RTX Series: RTX 3060 (130 W); RTX 3070 (140 W); RTX 3080 (165 W)	2 x SODIMM Slots Up to 64 GB DDR4 (3,200 MHz) Up to 32 GB LPDDR4			16" WQXGA (2560×1600), IPS 500nits matte 165 Hz, 100% sRGB Dolby Vision, HDR 400 Free-Sync G-Sync; 16" FHD (1920×1080), Free-Sync G-Sync	Intel Killer AX1650	60-80 Wh	Options: 300 W	356 x 260 x 20.1-23.5 mm (14.02 x 10.23 x 0.79-0.93 inches)	2.5 kg/5.5 lbs	
Legion Slim 7 (Gen 6)	2021	AMD Ryzen 5000 Series: Ryzen 5 5600H; Ryzen 7 5800H; Ryzen 9 5900HX	Nvidia GeForce RTX Series: RTX 3050 (95 W); RTX 3050 ti (95 W); RTX 3060 (100 W)	8/16 GB Soldered DDR4 1 x SODIMM Slots (3200 MHz)			15.6" FHD (1920×1080), 300 nits; 15.6" UHD (3840x2160), 500 nits	Intel Killer AX1650	71 Wh	Options: 170 W; 230 W	356 x 252 x 15.9-18.9 mm (14.02 x 9.92 x 0.63-0.74 inches)	1.9 kg/4.2 lbs	
Legion Slim 7i (Gen 5)	2020	10th Gen Intel Core: i5-10300H; i7-10750H; i7-10870H; i7-10875H; i9-10980HK	Nvidia GeForce: RTX 2060 Max-Q; GTX 1660 Ti Max-Q; GTX 1650 Ti				15,6" FHD IPS 144 Hz 300 nits; 15,6" FHD IPS 60 Hz 300 nits; 15,6" FHD IPS 60 Hz 250 nits	Intel Killer	71 Wh		35.6 cm × 25.0 cm × 1.79 cm	1.86 kg/4.1 lbs	
Legion 5i Gen 7	2022	12th Gen Intel Core H Series: i5-12450H; i5-12500H; i7-12700H	Nvidia GeForce RTX Series: RTX 3050 Ti; RTX 3060; RTX 3070 Ti	Up to 32 GB DDR5 4800 MHz			15.6″ FHD (1920 x 1080) IPS, 300 nits, 165 Hz refresh rate with OverDrive, 100% sRGB, up to VESA DisplayHDR 400 certified, Dolby Vision support, NVIDIA G-SYNC support, 16:9 aspect ratio	WiFi 6E 802.11AX (2 x 2); Bluetooth^{®} 5.1	60 Whr	230 W slim tip (3-pin) AC adapter	19.99–24.05 × 358.8 × 262.35 mm (0.79-0.95 x 14.13 x 10.33")	Starting at 2.4 kg / 5.29 lbs	
Legion 5 Gen 7	2022	AMD Ryzen 6000 Series: R5 6600H; R7 6800H	Nvidia Laptop GPU: RTX 3050; RTX 3050 Ti	Up to 32 GB DDR5 4800 MHz (2 x 16 GB)			15.6″ FHD (1920 x 1080) IPS, anti-glare,16:9 aspect ratio, 165 Hz refresh rate (3ms response time with OverDrive), 100% sRGB, 300 nits, Dolby Vision^{®} support, NVIDIA^{®} G-SYNC^{®} support, AMD FreeSync™ Premium	WiFi 6E* 802.11AX (2 x 2); Bluetooth^{®} 5.2	60 Whr	230 W slim tip (3-pin) AC adapter	19.99–24.05 × 358.8 × 262.35 mm (0.79-0.95 x 14.13 x 10.33")	Starting at 2.4 kg / 5.29 lbs	
Legion 5i Pro Gen 7	2022	12th Gen Intel Core H Series: i5-12500H; i7-12700H; i9-12900H	Nvidia Laptop GPU: RTX 3050 Ti 4 GB; RTX 3060 6 GB; RTX 3070 Ti 8 GB; RTX 3070 8 GB	Up to 32 GB DDR5 4800 MHz			16.0" WQXGA (2560 x 1600) IPS, anti-glare with Dolby Vision™, NVIDIA G-SYNC™, HDR 400, 500 nits, 165 Hz	WiFi 6E 802.11AX (2 x 2); Bluetooth^{®} 5.1	80 Whr	300 W slim tip (3-pin) AC adapter	19.9-26.6 × 359.9 × 264.4 mm (0.78-1.05 x 14.17 x 10.4")	Starting at 2.49 kg / 5.49 lbs	
Legion 5 Pro Gen 7	2022	AMD Ryzen 6000 Series: R5 6600H; R7 6800H	Nvidia Laptop GPU: RTX 3060 6 GB; RTX 3070 Ti 8 GB; RTX 3070 8 GB	Up to 32 GB DDR5 4800 MHz (2 x 16 GB)			16″ WQXGA (2560 x 1600) IPS, 16:10 aspect ratio, 165 Hz refresh rate, 100% sRGB, 500 nits, VESA DisplayHDR 400 certified, Dolby Vision support, NVIDIA G-SYNC support, AMD FreeSync Premium, TÜV Rheinland Certified, X-Rite calibrated, MUX	WiFi 6E* 802.11AX (2 x 2); Bluetooth^{®} 5.2	80 Whr	230 W slim tip (3-pin) AC adapter; 300 W slim tip (3-pin) AC adapter	19.9-26.6 × 359.9 × 264.4 mm (0.78-1.05 x 14.17 x 10.4")	Starting at 2.49 kg / 5.49 lbs	
Legion 7i Gen 7	2022	12th Gen Intel Core HX series: Core i7-12800HX; Core i9-12900HX	Nvidia Laptop GPU: RTX 3070 Ti; RTX 3080 Ti	32 GB DDR5 4800 MHz (2 x 16 GB)			16″ WQXGA (2560 x 1600) IPS, anti-glare, 500 nits, 16:10 aspect ratio, 165 Hz (3ms response time), 100% sRGB, up to VESA DisplayHDR™ 400 Certified, Dolby Vision™ support, NVIDIA^{®} G-SYNC™ support, TÜV Rheinland certified	Intel^{®} WiFi 6E 802.11AX (2 x 2); Bluetooth^{®} 5.2; Intel Killer Ethernet	99 Whr	135 W Type-C Power Delivery; 300 W Slim Adapter	Starting at 19.4 mm × 358.1 mm × 263.5 mm / 0.76″ x 14.1″ x 10.37″	Less than 2.5 kg / 5.51 lbs	
Legion Slim 7i Gen 7	2022	12th Gen Intel Core H Series: Core i5-12500H; Core i7-12700H; Core i9-12900H	Nvidia Laptop GPU: RTX 3050 Ti; RTX 3060; RTX 3070 Ti	16 GB (8 GB soldered & 1 DIMM Slot) 4800 MHz DDR5; Supports up to 24 GB			16″ WUXGA (1920 x 1200) IPS, anti-glare, 350 nits, 16:10 aspect ratio, 165 Hz refresh rate, 100% sRGB; 16" WQXGA (2560 x 1600) IPS, anti-glare with Dolby Vision™, G-Sync, HDR 400, 500 nits, 165 Hz	Intel^{®} WiFi 6E 802.1AX (2 x 2); Bluetooth^{®} 5.2	71 Whr	170 W or 230 W AC Adapter	Starting at 16.9 mm × 357.7 mm × 260 mm / 0.67″ x 14.08″ x 10.24″	Starting at 2.175 kg/4.79 lbs	
Legion 7 Gen 7	2022	AMD Ryzen 6000 Series: R7 6800H; R9 6900HX	AMD Radeon Mobile GPU: RX 6700M; RX 6850M XT	Up to 32 GB DDR5 4800 MHz			16″ WQXGA (2560 x 1600) IPS, anti-glare, 500 nits, 16:10 aspect ratio, 165 Hz (3ms response time), 100% sRGB, up to VESA DisplayHDR™ 400 Certified, Dolby Vision^{®} support, AMD FreeSync™ Premium, TÜV Rheinland^{®} certified	WiFi 6E 802.11AX (2 x 2); Bluetooth^{®} 5.2	99 Whr	300 W AC Adapter	Starting at 19.4 mm × 358.1 mm × 263.5 mm / 0.76″ x 14.1″ x 10.37″	Less than 2.5 kg / 5.51 lbs	
Legion Slim 7 Gen 7	2022	AMD Ryzen 6000 Series: R7 6800H; R9 6900HX	AMD Radeon Mobile GPU: RX 6600S; RX 6800S	16 GB (8 GB soldered & 1 DIMM Slot) 4800 MHz DDR5; Supports up to 24 GB			16″ WUXGA (1920 x 1200) IPS, anti-glare, 350 nits, 16:10 aspect ratio, 165 Hz refresh rate, 100% sRGB; 16" WQXGA (2560 x 1600) IPS, anti-glare with Dolby Vision™, G-Sync, HDR 400, 500 nits, 165 Hz	WiFi 6 802.11AX (2 x 2); Bluetooth^{®} 5.1	71-99 Whr	230 W AC Adapter	Starting at 16.9 mm × 357.7 mm × 260 mm / 0.67″ x 14.08″ x 10.24″	Starting at 2.175 kg/4.79 lbs	
Legion Pro 5i Gen 8	2023	13th Gen Intel Core HX Series: i5-13500HX; i7-13700HX; i9-13900HX	Nvidia GeForce RTX Laptop GPU: RTX 4050; RTX 4060; RTX 4070	Up to 32 GB (2 x 16GB) 4800 MHz DDR5; Up to 32 GB (2 x 16GB) 5600 MHz DDR5			16.0" WQXGA (2560 x 1600), IPS, Anti-Glare, Non-Touch, 100%sRGB, 300 nits, 165 Hz, Narrow Bezel, Low Blue Light; 16.0" WQXGA (2560 x 1600), IPS, Anti-Glare, Non-Touch, HDR 400, 100%sRGB, 500 nits, 240 Hz	WiFi 6E* 802.11AX (2 x 2); Bluetooth^{®} 5.1	80Whr	230 W or 300 W AC Power Adapter	21.9-26.75 × 363.4 × 260.35 mm (0.86-1.05 x 14.3 x 10.25″)	Starting at 2.5 kg / 5.51 lbs	
Legion Pro 7i Gen 8	2023	13th Gen Intel Core HX Series: i7-13700HX; i9-13900HX	Nvidia GeForce RTX Laptop GPU: RTX 4070; RTX 4080; RTX 4090	Up to 32 GB overclocked DDR5 (2 x 16GB 6000 MHz)			16″ WQXGA (2560 x 1600), 16:10 aspect ratio, 240 Hz variable refresh rate, 100% RGB, 500 nits, up to VESA DisplayHDR™ 400 Certified, Dolby Vision^{®} Support, NVIDIA^{®} G-SYNC™ Support / TÜV Rheinland Certified, X-Rite™ Pantone Certified, LA2-Q AI chip	WiFi 6E 802.11AX (2 x 2); Bluetooth^{®} 5.2	99Whr	300 W AC Adapter	21.95-25.9 × 363.4 × 262.15 mm (0.86-1.01 x 14.3 x 10.32″)	Starting at 2.8 kg / 6.17 lbs	
Legion 9i Gen 8	2023	13th Gen Intel Core HX Series: i9-13980HX	Nvidia GeForce RTX Laptop GPU: RTX 4080; RTX 4090	32 GB (2 × 16GB) 6400 MHz overclocked DDR5; Up to 64 GB (2 × 32GB) 5600 MHz overclocked DDR5			16″ 3.2k (3200 x 2000), Mini LED, 16:10 aspect ratio, 165 Hz refresh rate (3ms response time), 100% Adobe, 100% DCI-P3, 1200 nits, up to VESA DisplayHDR™ 1000 Certified, Dolby Vision^{®} support, NVIDIA^{®} G-SYNC™ support, TÜV Rheinland Certified	WiFi 6E* 802.11AX (2 × 2); Bluetooth^{®} 5.1	99.99Whr; Super Rapid Charge (0%-70% in 30 minutes, 0%-100% capacity in 80 minutes)	330 W GaN adapter; 140 W USB-C adapter	18.99-22.7 mm × 357.7 mm × 277.7 mm / .75″-.89″ x 14.08″ x 10.93″	Starting at 2.5 kg / 5.51 lbs	
Legion Slim 5i Gen 8	2023	13th Gen Intel Core H Series: i5-13420H; i5-13500H; i7-13700H	Nvidia GeForce RTX Laptop GPU: RTX 4050; RTX 4060; RTX 4070	Up to 32 GB 5200 MHz DDR5 (2 x 16GB)			16" WUXGA (1920 x 1200), IPS, Anti-Glare, Non-Touch, 45%NTSC, 300 nits, 144 Hz, Narrow Bezel; 16″, WQXGA (2560 x 1600) IPS; 16:10 (165 Hz VRR/ 5ms/3ms Response Time w/OD / 100% sRGB / 350 nits /Dolby Vision^{®} Support / NVIDIA^{®} G-SYNC^{®} Support / TÜV Rheinland^{®} Certified: Hardware Low Blue Light & High gaming Performance / X-Rite Pantone^{®} Certified)	Intel^{®} WiFi 6E* 802.11AX (2 x 2); Bluetooth^{®} 5.1	80Whr	170 W or 230 W Slim Adapter	NVIDIA^{®} GeForce RTX™ 4060 / 4070 Laptop GPU SKU: 19.7-25.2 mm × 359.7 mm × 260.3 mm / 078″-0.99″ x 14.16″ x 10.25″; NVIDIA^{®} GeForce RTX™ 4050 Laptop GPU SKU: 19.7-21.9 mm × 359.7 mm × 260.3 mm / 0.78″-0.86″ x 14.16″ x 10.25″	Starting at <2.3 kg / 5.07 lbs	
Legion Slim 7i Gen 8	2023	13th Gen Intel Core H Series: i5-13500H; i7-13700H; i9-13900H	Nvidia GeForce RTX Laptop GPU: RTX 4050; RTX 4060; RTX 4070	Up to 32 GB DDR5 5200 MHz (2 x 16 GB)			16″ WQXGA (2560 x 1600) IPS; 16:10 (240 Hz VRR / 5ms/3ms Response Time w/OD / 100% sRGB / 500 nits / Up to VESA DisplayHDR™ 400 Certified / Dolby Vision^{®} Support / NVIDIA^{®} G-SYNC^{®} Support / TÜV Rheinland^{®} Certified: Hardware Low Blue Light & High Gaming Performance / X-Rite Pantone^{®} Certified); 16″ 3.2K (3200 x 2000) IPS; 16:10 (165 Hz VRR / 3ms Response Time w/OD / 100% DCl-P3 / 430 nits /Dolby Vision^{®} Support / NVIDIA^{®} G-SYNC^{®} Support / TÜV Rheinland^{®} Certified: Hardware Low Blue Light & High gaming Performance / X-Rite Pantone^{®} Certified)	Intel WiFi 6E* 802.11AX (2 x 2); Bluetooth^{®} 5.1	99.9Whr	230 W Slim Adapter	17.6-19.9 mm × 357.7 mm × 259.3 mm / 0.69-0.78” x 14.08″ x 10.21″	Starting at <2 kg / 4.4 lbs	
Legion Pro 5 Gen 8	2023	AMD Ryzen 7040HX Series: R5 7645HX; R7 7745HX; R9 7945HX	Nvidia GeForce RTX Laptop GPU: RTX 4050; RTX 4060; RTX 4070	Up to 32 GB DDR5 5200 MHz (2 x 16 GB)			16″ WQXGA (2560 x 1600) IPS; 16:10 (165 Hz/ GTG 5ms w/o OD, 3ms W/ OD Response Time / 100%sRGB / 300nits /Dolby Vision support/NVIDIA G-SYNC Support/AMD Freesync premium/TUV certified High Gaming Performance Display with low blue light); 16" WQXGA (2560 x 1600), IPS, Anti-Glare, Non-Touch, HDR 400, 100%sRGB, 500 nits, 240 Hz, Narrow Bezel, Low Blue Light	WiFi 6E* 802.11AX (2 x 2); Bluetooth^{®} 5.1	80Whr	230 W or 300 W AC Power Adapter	21.9-26.75 × 363.4 × 260.35 mm (0.86-1.05″ × 14.3 × 10.25″)	Starting at 2.5 kg / 5.51 lbs	
Legion Slim 5 Gen 8	2023	AMD Ryzen 7040HS Series: R7 7840HS; R5 7640HS	Nvidia GeForce RTX Laptop GPU: RTX 4050; RTX 4060	Up to 16 GB (2 x 8GB) 5600 MHz DDR5			16″ WQXGA (2560 x 1600) IPS; 16:10 (165 Hz, 5ms, 3ms response time with OD, 100% sRGB, 300 nits, Dolby Vision^{®} support, NVIDIA^{®} G-SYNC^{®}, AMD FreeSync™ Premium, hardware low blue light, X-Rite Pantone^{®} certified); 16.0" WQXGA (2560 x 1600), IPS, Anti-Glare, Non-Touch, 100%sRGB, 350 nits, 165 Hz, Narrow Bezel, Low Blue Light; 16″ WUXGA (1920 x 1600) IPS; 16:10 (144 Hz, 45% NTSC, 300 nits, NVIDIA^{®} G-SYNC^{®}, AMD FreeSync™ Premium)	WiFi 6E* 802.11AX (2 x 2); Bluetooth^{®} 5.1	Up to 80Whr; Up to 5 hours; Supports Super Rapid Charge (10 min charge 0-30% capacity, 30 min charge 0-70% capacity, 80 min charge 0-100% capacity)	230 W AC power adapter	357.7 × 259.3 × 17.6-19.9 mm (14.08 × 10.21 × 0.69-0.78″)	Starting at < 2 kg / 4.4 lbs	
Legion Slim 7 Gen 8	2023	AMD Ryzen 7040HS Series: R7 7840HS	Nvidia GeForce RTX Laptop GPU: RTX 4060	Up to 32 GB 5600 MHz DDR5			16″ WQXGA (2560 x 1600) IPS, 16:10, 240 Hz VRR / 5ms/3ms Response Time w/OD / 100% sRGB, 500 nits, Dolby Vision Support, NVIDIA G-SYNC Support, AMD FreeSync Premium, TÜV Rheinland Certified, X-Rite Pantone Certified; 16" 3.2K (3200 x 2000), IPS, 16:10, 165 Hz, 100% DCI-P3, 430 nits, NVIDIA G-SYNC Support, TÜV Rheinland Certified, X-Rite Pantone Certified	WiFi 6E* 802.11AX (2 x 2); Bluetooth^{®} 5.1	99.99Whr; Supports Super Rapid Charge (10 min charge: 0-30% capacity; 30 min charge: 0-70% capacity; 80 min charge: 0-100% capacity)	230 W AC power adapter	357.7 × 259.3 × 17.6-19.9 mm (14.08 × 10.21 × 0.69-0.78″)	Starting at < 2 kg / 4.4 lbs	
Legion Pro 5i Gen 9	2024	14th Gen Intel Core HX Series: i7-14650HX; i7-14700HX; i9-14900HX	Nvidia GeForce RTX Laptop GPU: RTX 4060; RTX 4070	Up to 32 GB (2 x 16GB) 5600 MHz DDR5			16″ WQXGA (2560 x 1600) IPS, 16:10 aspect ratio, 240 Hz / 3ms response time w/ OverDrive, 100% DCI-P3, 500 nits, Up to VESA DisplayHDR 400 Certified, Dolby Vision Support, NVIDIA G-SYNC Support, TUV Rheinland Certified, X-Rite Pantone Certified; 16″ WQXGA (2560 x 1600) IPS, 16:10 aspect ratio, 165 Hz / 3ms response time w/ OverDrive, 100% sRGB, 300 nits, Dolby Vision Support, NVIDIA G-SYNC Support, TUV Rheinland Certified, X-Rite Pantone Certified	Intel^{®} WiFi 6E 802.11AX (2 x 2); Bluetooth^{®} 5.2	80 W; Up to 5.2 hours; Super Rapid Charge Pro (30 minutes charge for 0-80% capacity, 60 minutes charge for 0-100% capacity)	300 W AC Adapter	22.45-26.75 × 363.4 × 260.4 mm (0.88-1.05″ × 14.3″ × 10.25″)	Starting at 2.5 kg / 5.51lbs	
Legion Pro 7i Gen 9	2024	14th Gen Intel Core HX Series: i9-14900HX	Nvidia GeForce RTX Laptop GPU: RTX 4080; RTX 4090	32 GB overclocked DDR5 (2 x 16GB 6000 MHz)			16″ WQXGA (2560 x 1600), 16:10 aspect ratio, 240 Hz variable refresh rate, 100% RGB, 500 nits, up to VESA DisplayHDR 400 Certified, Dolby Vision Support, NVIDIA G-SYNC Support / TÜV Rheinland Certified, X-Rite Pantone Certified, LA2-Q AI chip	Intel^{®} Killer™ WiFi 6E 802.11AX (2 x 2); Bluetooth 5.1	Up to 99.99Whr; Up to 8 hours (target); Super Rapid Charge (30-minute charge for 0-80% capacity, or 60-minute charge for 0-100% capacity)	330 W AC adapter	21.95-25.9 × 363.4 × 262.15 mm (0.86-1.01 × 14.3 × 10.32″)	Starting at 2.8 kg / 6.17lbs	
Legion 5i Gen 9		14th Gen Intel Core HX Series: i7-14650HX; i7-14700HX; i9-14900HX	Nvidia GeForce RTX Laptop GPU: RTX 4060; RTX 4070	Up to 32 GB 5600 MHz DDR5; 2 x SO-DIMM			16″ WQXGA (2560 x 1600) IPS, 16:10, 240 Hz, 5ms / 3ms response time with OD, 100% sRGB, 500 nits, up-to VESA DisplayHDR™ 400 certified, Dolby Vision^{®}, NVIDIA^{®} G-SYNC^{®}, TÜV Rheinland^{®} certified: hardware low blue light and high gaming performance, X-Rite calibration; 16″ WQXGA (2560 x 1600) IPS, 16:10, (165 Hz, 5ms / 3ms response time with OD, 100% sRGB, 350 nits, Dolby Vision^{®}, G-SYNC^{®}, TÜV Rheinland^{®} certified: hardware low blue light and high gaming performance, X-Rite calibration	Intel^{®} WiFi 6E 802.11AX (2 x 2); Bluetooth^{®} 5.2	Up to 4-cell 80Whr; Supports Super Rapid Charge (10-min charge 0-30% capacity, 30-min charge 0-70% capacity, 80-min charge 0-100% capacity)	300 W AC Adapter	19.7-25.2 × 359.7 × 262.3 mm (0.78-0.99 × 14.16 × 10.33″)	Starting at 2.3 kg / 5.1lbs	

=== Smartphones ===
- Legion Pro
- Legion 2 Pro
- Legion Y90
- Legion Y70 (2022)
- Legion Y70 (2026)

=== Tablets ===
- Legion Y700
- Legion Tab

=== Handheld PC ===
- Legion Go
- Legion Go 2

== See also ==
- IdeaPad Y series
- HP Omen
- Dell Alienware
- Intel Core
- AMD Ryzen
- Nvidia GeForce
- ASUS ROG
