= Lenovo LOQ =

Series of laptops

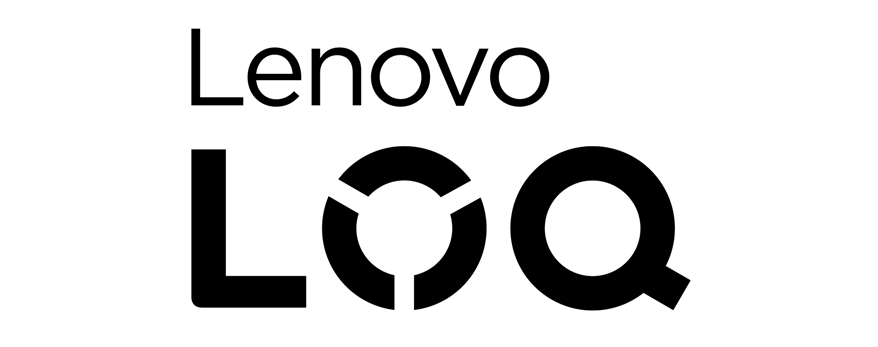
Lenovo LOQ Logo

The LOQ series is a series of laptops and desktops created by Chinese tech company Lenovo, and are marketed as lower-end, more budget-friendly versions of their Legion series of gaming laptops. It primarily competed with Acer's Nitro, Dell's G Series, and HP's Victus.

== History ==
The Lenovo LOQ (pronounced "lock") was launched on 23 March 2023, As a budget-friendly version of the Lenovo Legion series. Although described as entry-level, the LOQ shares many features and design elements with the Legion.

=== First Generation (Gen 8) ===
The launch lineup consisted of four laptop models, the LOQ 15IRH8, LOQ 15APH8, LOQ16IRH8, and LOQ 16APH8 Alongside the desktop LOQ Tower 17IRB8. These models featured Intel 13th-generation H-Series or AMD Ryzen 7000 Processors, Paired with Nvidia GeForce-40 series.

The first generation LOQ laptops adopted a gray chassis with blue and rear side exhaust vents, MIL-STD 810H durability testing, and support for upgradable DDR5 memory and duel storage slots. The 15-inch models launched at a starting price of US$899.99, while the 16-inch models started at US$1,149,99

The LOQ Tower 17IRB8 featured a 17-liter chassis with blue accented front ventilation. It could be optioned up to a 13th-gen Intel Core i7-13700 processor, Nvidia Geforce-40 Series, 32GB DDR4 memory and hybrid storage options supporting one SSD and up to two HDDs. The starting price was US$979.99 becoming available in April 2023.

=== Second Generation (Gen 9) ===
The second generation of the LOQ lineup was introduced at the Consumers Electronics Show (CES) in January 2024. One of the major updates was a new Hyper-Chamber thermal design and removal of side air vents and blue accenting, consolidating the exhaust vents to the rear. A new circular power button was added with the same design as the Legion. A new color called Surge-Green was added.

The lineup included the LOQ 15IRX9, 16IRX9, 15AHP9, 16APH9, 15ARP9, and 15IAX9I. These models introduced support for 14th-gen Intel processors and AMD Ryzen 8040-series processors, while retaining the Nvidia GeForce 40-series.

The Desktop version was redesigned with a new power button and removal of blue vents. Support for 14th-gen Intel and AMD Ryzen 8000-series was added. The Nvidia GeForce 40-series was retained. The lineup consisted of the LOQ Tower 17IRR9, 17IAX9, 17ADR9 and 26ADR9.

=== Third Generation (Gen 10) ===
The Third Generation of the LOQ was shown at CES 2025, with the biggest change being the introduction of the Nvidia 50-series. The lineup included the LOQ 15IRX10, 16IRX10, 17IRX10, 15 APH10 16APH10, and 15AHP10.

The desktop lineup consisted of the LOQ Tower 17IAX10, 17IRX10, and 26ADR10.

The price of the LOQ has stayed relatively the same.

== Products ==
=== Laptops ===
==== 15 inch ====
- 15IRH8 – 2023 thin and light gaming laptop. 2560 x 1440 standard display and as well as a Nvidia GeForce 40 series with up to a GeForce RTX 4060 Laptop GPU 8 GB GDDR6 and Intel 13th generation CPU.
- 15APH8 – 2023 thin and light gaming laptop. 2560 x 1440 standard display and as well as a Nvidia GeForce 40 series with up to a GeForce RTX 4060 Laptop GPU 8 GB GDDR6 and AMD Ryzen 7 generation CPU.

Newer 9th gen models came with an overhaul design with similar specs.

- 15ARP9 2024 model, AMD Ryzen R5-7235HS/AMD Ryzen R7-7435HS, GeForce RTX 40 Laptop series GPU (3050/4050/5060) 15.6" FHD (1920 x 1080), IPS, Anti-Glare, Non-Touch, 100%sRGB, 300 nits, 144Hz
- 15APH10 2025 model, AMD Ryzen 7 250, GeForce RTX 50 Laptop series GPU (5050/5060) 15.6" FHD (1920 x 1080), IPS, Anti-Glare, Non-Touch, 100%sRGB, 300 nits, 144Hz
- 15IRX10 2025 model, 13th Generation Intel Core CPU i5-13450HX/i7-13650HX/i7-14700HX, GeForce RTX 50 Laptop series GPU (5050/5060) 15.6" FHD (1920 x 1080), IPS, Anti-Glare, Non-Touch, 100%sRGB, 300 nits, 144Hz

==== 17 inch ====
- 17IRX10 – 2025 model, 13th Generation Intel Core CPU i5-13450HX/i7-13650HX/i7-14700HX, GeForce RTX 50 Laptop series GPU (5050/5060/5070). 17.3" FHD (1920 x 1080), IPS, Anti-Glare, Non-Touch, 100% sRGB, 300 nits, 165Hz

== General specifications ==
The Lenovo LOQ series use both Intel Core and AMD Ryzen processors. They utilize LCD displays of varying sizes and resolutions. The LOQ series uses Nvidia's RTX GPU architecture for their Graphics cards, ranging from 2060s on the low end to 4060s at the higher end. All of them utilize at least 12 gigabytes of SODIMM DDR5 RAM.

== Critical reception ==
The Lenovo LOQ series has received overall neutral to positive reviews.

PC World magazine gave the Lenovo LOQ 15" laptop three out of five stars. While they approve of the low price and good build quality, they criticize its poor performance and battery life.

PCMag gave the LOQ 15" 3.5 out of 5 stars. This review cited its good keyboard and the performance given from its RTX 4050 while criticizing its all-plastic construction and high weight factor.
