= HP Omen =

Gaming brand by HP Inc.

HP OMEN
- Manufacturer: VoodooPC (2008-2012); HP (2013-2025); HyperX (2026-present)
- Product family: HP OMEN; HP Victus; HyperX
- Type: Gaming computers
- Released: June 10, 2008
- Operating system: Microsoft Windows
- Marketing target: Gaming
- Website: hyperx.com/pages/omen-gaming

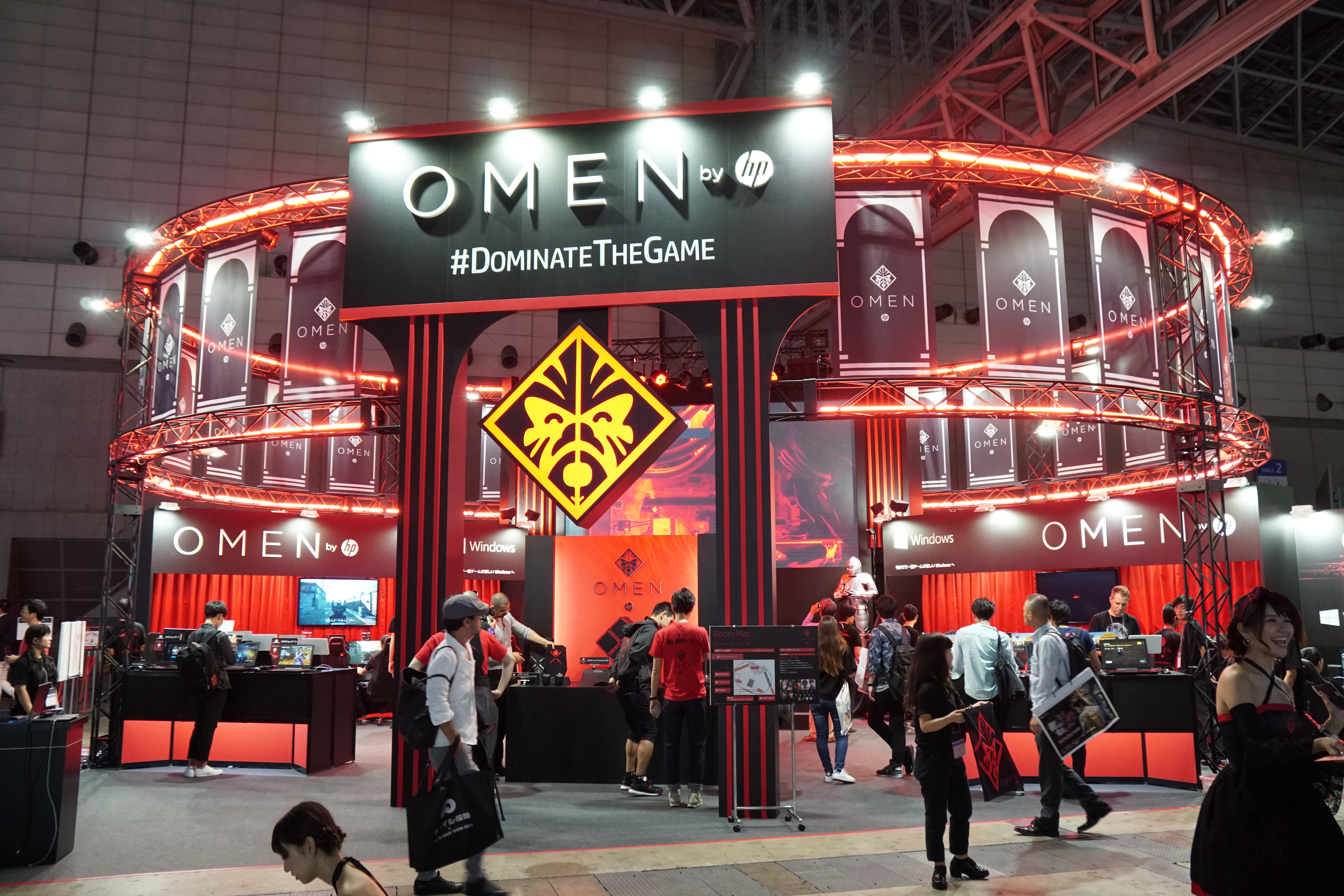
OMEN booth in 2017

HP OMEN, also known as simply OMEN or OMEN by HP, is a line of high-end gaming PCs, laptops, peripherals and PC parts manufactured by HP. The name comes from the former VoodooPCs line of desktops that was inherited by HP.

The HP Victus is a line of mid-range gaming computers and laptops which replaced the Pavilion Gaming brand in 2021. Victus products are sold alongside OMEN products.

HyperX

The HyperX brand of gaming mice, keyboards, microphones and controllers is also owned by HP after an acquisition from Kingston in 2021. Like Victus products, HyperX products are also sold alongside the main OMEN brand.

The OMEN line directly competes with Lenovo's Legion, Dell's Alienware, Acer's Predator and ASUS' ROG series whereas the Victus line directly competes with Dell's G Series, Lenovo's LOQ, Acer's Nitro, and ASUS' TUF.

In January 2026, HP merged the Omen brand with HyperX.

== History ==
On September 28, 2006, HP acquired VoodooPC, a company that specialized in producing high-end, personalized gaming computers. Earlier that year, Dell, competitor to HP, had acquired Alienware, competitor to VoodooPC.

On June 10, 2008, VoodooPC launched the OMEN brand.

On November 4, 2014, HP relaunched the OMEN brand of gaming computers that inherited VoodooPC's tribal mask logo. The first product under the new brand was a 15-inch gaming laptop. HP changed the logo of the OMEN brand from the tribal mask design to a simple 45° square shape in 2020.

In February 2021, HP acquired HyperX from Kingston and no longer produces gaming peripherals.

In March 2025, HP announced a lineup of OMEN-branded standalone PC parts. Their initial offering included two sizes of case fans, two sizes of AIO CPU cooling units, and a 1000W PSU.

On January 2026, the OMEN brand had integrated under HyperX.

== Desktops ==
=== OMEN X ===
In 2016, HP co-developed the OMEN X with Maingear, a cube-shaped PC with a 45 degree angled design.

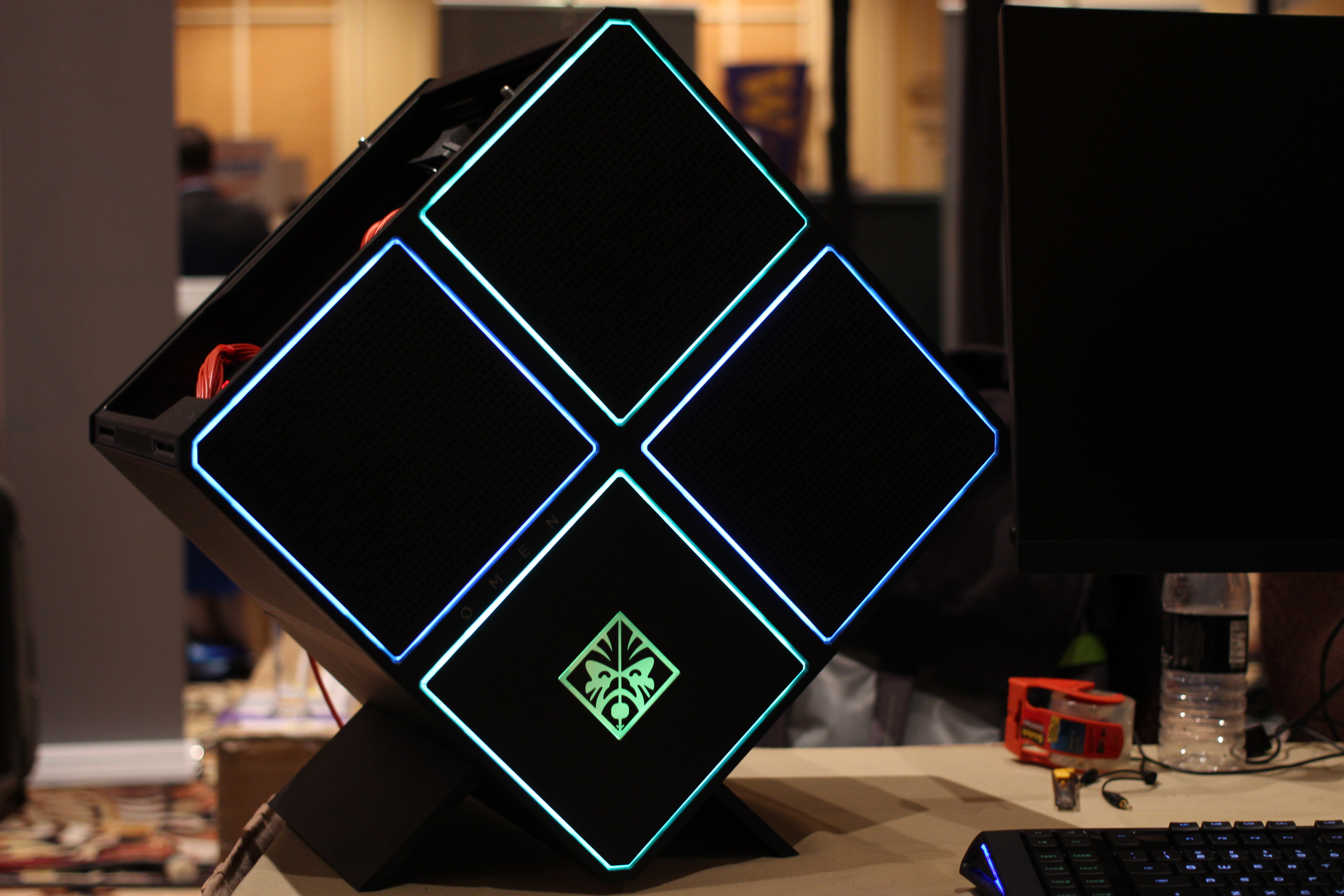
OMEN X 900

=== OMEN Obelisk ===
The HP Omen Obelisk from 2019 features a compact microATX build, equipped with Intel Core i9 and Nvidia GeForce RTX 2080 Ti graphics.

=== OMEN L-series ===
In 2020, HP released the 25L and 30L line of configurable desktops. The number before the L denotes the liter capacity inside of the case.

At gamescom 2024, HP introduced the 35L line of configurable desktops.

== Laptop computers ==
HP has sold Omen laptops that have either Intel or AMD processors.

One of HP's laptop computers in the Omen line is the HP Omen 16. Another laptop in the Omen line is the Omen 17, which has an approximately 17 inch screen.

== See also ==
- HP Envy, the Envy name was also from former VoodooPC line of laptops
