= Acer Predator =

Acer's gaming brand

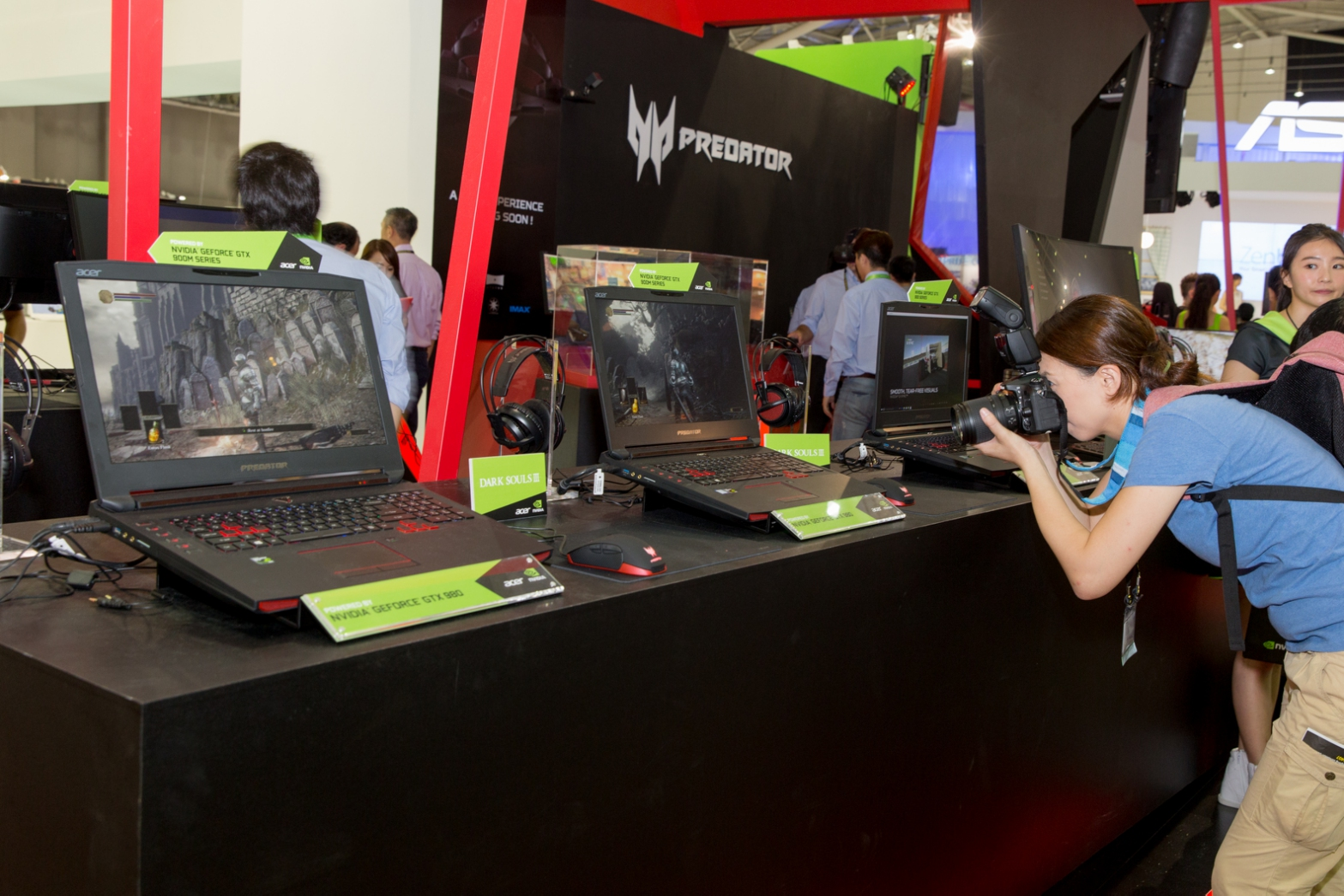
- Various Acer Predator laptops on display at Computex Taipei in 2016
- Manufacturer: Acer Inc.
- Product family: Predator
- Type: Laptop, Desktop, Monitor, Projector
- Released: 2008
- Operating system: Windows
- Marketing target: Gaming
- Related: Acer Aspire
- Website: www.acer.com/predator predator.acer.com

Predator Gaming is a gamer-focused brand and line of computer hardware owned by Acer. In 2008, Acer introduced itself in the gaming computer market with a line of desktop computers: the Acer Aspire Predator series, later renamed as Acer Predator. The series was initially noted for its distinctive chassis design and performance-focused components. Over time, the Predator line expanded to include gaming laptops, tablets, and accessories.

The range competes with Lenovo's LOQ series and Legion, Dell's G series and Alienware, BenQ's Mobiuz and Zowie, HP's Victus and Omen, Asus's TUF and ROG.

The Acer Predator series features high-refresh-rate displays and dedicated cooling systems. The series includes models positioned in both the premium and mid-range segments of the gaming laptop market.In 2026, Acer announced its first Predator-branded handheld gaming PC, the Predator Atlas 8, expected to release in October 2026 in North America.

== Laptops ==
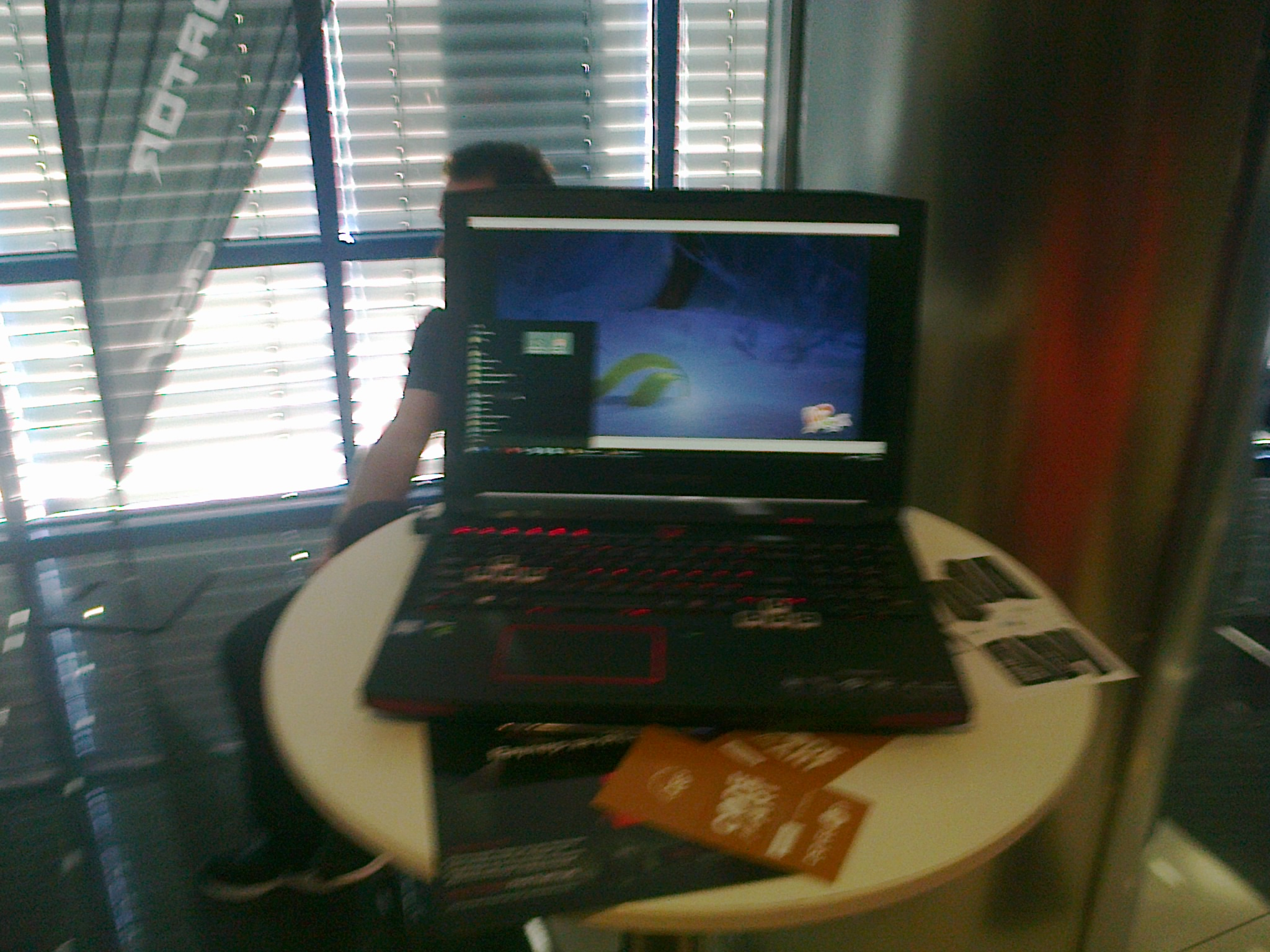
Acer Predator 15

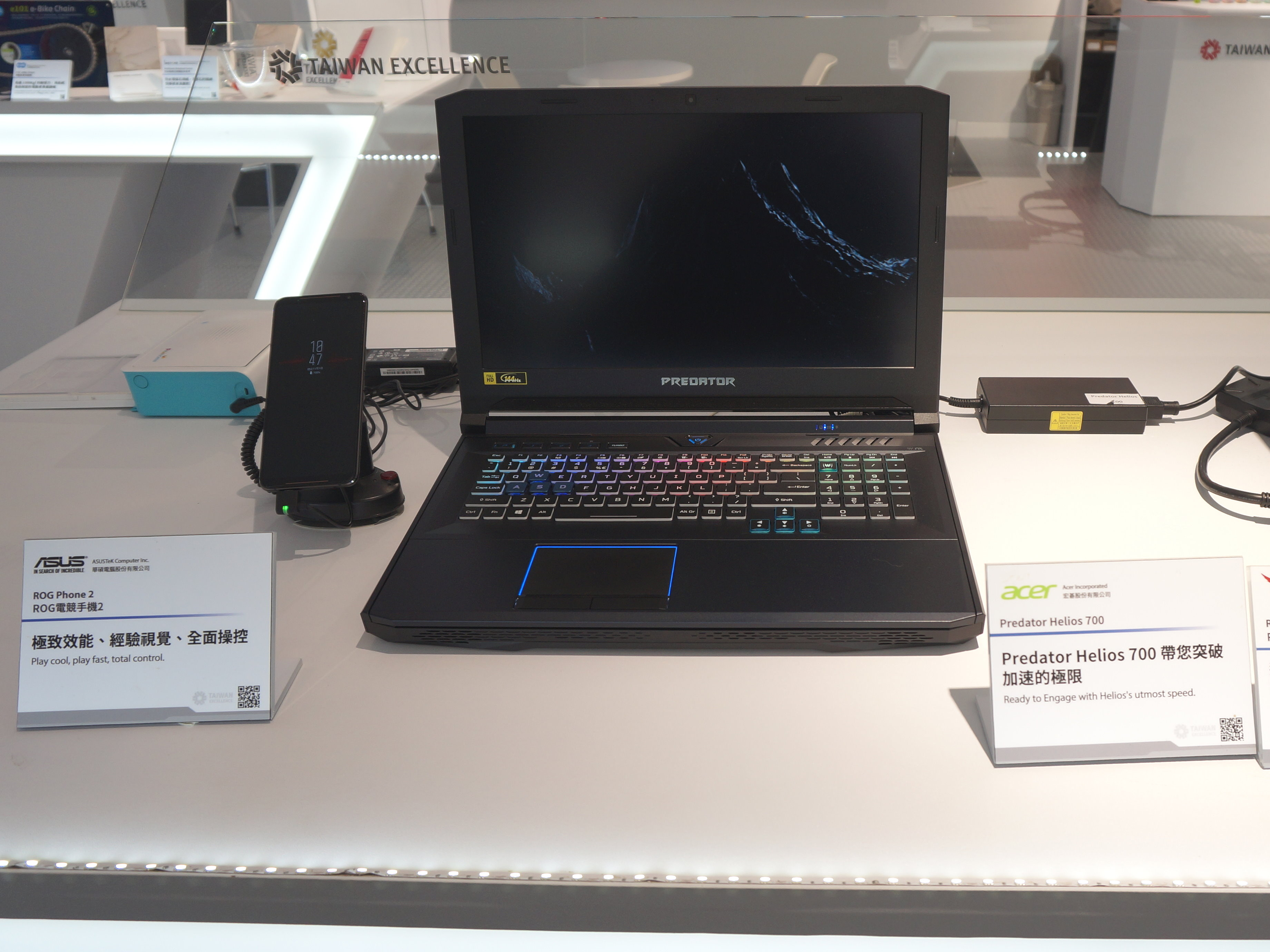
Acer Predator Helios 700

=== Specifications ===
Model			Processor (CPU)			RAM	Graphics (GPU)		Storage	Price (USD)	USB	Screen									
Model number		Part number	Model	Cores	GHz	RAM	Graphics (GPU)		Storage	Price (USD)	USB	Size (in)	IPS								
Helios 16	PH16-71-91FL	NH.QJSAA.004	Intel Core i9-13900HX	24	2.2-5.1	32 GB	RTX 4080	12 GB	2 TB SSD	2400	5	16	x								
Helios 700	PH717-71-75RX	NH.Q4YAA.002	Intel Core i7-9750H	6	2.6	16 GB	RTX 2080	8 GB	512 GBSSD	2500	5	17.3									
Helios 500	PH517-51-98Y7	PH517-51-98Y7	Intel Core i9-8950HK	8	2.9	16 GB	GTX 1070	8 GB	2 TB + 512 GB SSD	2500	4	17.3									
Helios 500	PH517-51-79E8	NH.Q3NAA.006	Intel Core i7-8750H	6	2.2	16 GB	GTX 1070	8 GB	1 TB + 512 GB SSD	2650		17.3									
Helios 500	PH517-51-72NU	NH.Q3NAA.003	Intel Core i7-8750H	6	2.2	16 GB	GTX 1070	8 GB	1 TB + 256 GB SSD	2000	4	17.3									
Helios 500	PH517-61-R0GX	NH.Q3GAA.001	7-2700	8	3.2	16 GB	Vega 56	8 GB	256 GB SSD	2000	3	17.3									
Helios 300 Special Edition	PH315-51-757A	NH.Q4HAA.001	Intel Core i7-8750H	6	2.2	16 GB	GTX 1060	6 GB	256 GB SSD	1400	4	15.6									
Helios 300	PH317-52-77A4	NH.Q3DAA.001	Intel Core i7-8750H	6	2.2	16 GB	GTX 1060	6 GB	1 TB + 256 GB SSD	1500	4	17.3	x								
Helios 300	PH315-51-78NP	NH.Q3FAA.001	Intel Core i7-8750H	6	2.2	16 GB	GTX 1060	6 GB	256 GB SSD	1300	4	15.6	x								
Helios 300	PH315-51-74V4	PH315-51-74V4	Intel Core i7-8750H	6	2.2	16 GB	GTX 1060	6 GB	1 TB + 256 GB SSD	1500	4	15.6	x								
Helios 300	PH317-52-78ZL	NH.Q3DAA.002	Intel Core i7-8750H	6	2.2	16 GB	GTX 1060	6 GB	1 TB + 256 GB SSD	1500	4	17.3	x								
Helios 300	PH317-52-74KR	NH.Q3DAA.005	Intel Core i7-8750H	6	2.2	16 GB	GTX 1060	6 GB	512 GB SSD	1400	4	17.3	x								
Helios 300	PH315-51-785A	NH.Q3FAA.006	Intel Core i7-8750H	6	2.2	16 GB	GTX 1060	6 GB	512 GB SSD	1400	4	15.6	x								
Helios 300	PH315-51-71FS	NH.Q3FAA.007	Intel Core i7-8750H	6	2.2	8 GB	GTX 1060	6 GB	1 TB	1300	4	15.6	x								
Helios 300	PH317-52-74VY	NH.Q3EAA.001	Intel Core i7-8750H	6	2.2	12 GB	GTX 1050 Ti	4 GB	1 TB + 128 GB SSD	1600		17.3									
Helios 300	PH315-51-73SO	NH.Q3FAA.001	Intel Core i7-8750H	6	2.2	16 GB	GTX 1060	6 GB	1 TB + 256 GB SSD	1900	4	15.6									
Helios 300	PH315-51-56KX	NH.Q3FAA.003	Intel Core i5-8300H	4	2.3	8 GB	GTX 1060	6 GB	256 GB SSD	1100	4	15.6									
Helios 300	PH317-53-57MW	NH.Q5PSI.007	Intel Core i5-9300H	4	2.4	16 GB	GTX 1660 Ti	6 GB	1 TB + 256 GB SSD	1100	3	17.3									
Helios 300	G3-572-72YF	NH.Q2BAA.003	Intel Core i7-7700HQ	4	2.8	16 GB	GTX 1060	6 GB	1 TB + 256 GB SSD	1400	4	15.6	x								
Helios 300	PH317-51-7578	NH.Q29AA.003	Intel Core i7-7700HQ	4	2.8	16 GB	GTX 1060	6 GB	1 TB + 128 GB SSD	1400	4	17.3									
Helios 300	G3-572-7526	NH.Q2BAA.007	Intel Core i7-7700HQ	4	2.8	16 GB	GTX 1060	6 GB	1 TB + 256 GB SSD	1400	4	15.6	x								
Helios 300	G3-571-77KB	NH.Q28AA.005	Intel Core i7-7700HQ	4	2.8	8 GB	GTX 1060	6 GB	1 TB	1000	4	15.6									
Helios 300	G3-571-73H3	NH.Q28AA.006	Intel Core i7-7700HQ	4	2.8	8 GB	GTX 1060	6 GB	256 GB SSD	1000	4	15.6									
Helios 300	PH317-51-787B	NH.Q29AA.002	Intel Core i7-7700HQ	4	2.8	16 GB	GTX 1060	6 GB	1 TB + 256 GB SSD	1900	4	17.3									
Triton 900	PT917-71-78FC	NH.Q4VAA.004	Intel Core i7-9750H	6	2.6	32 GB	RTX 2080	8 GB	1 TB SSD	4300	3	17.3									
Triton 900	PT917-71-969CC	NH.Q4VAA.005	Intel Core i9-9980HK	8	2.4	32 GB	RTX 2080	8 GB	1 TB SSD	4300	3	17.3	x								
Triton 700	PT715-51-761M	NH.Q2KAA.001	Intel Core i7-7700HQ	4	2.8	16 GB	GTX 1060	6 GB	512 GB SSD	2800		15.6									
Triton 700	PT715-51-75EG	NH.Q2LET.007	Intel Core i7-7700HQ	4	2.8	16 GB	GTX 1080	8 GB	512 GB SSD	3000		15.6									
Triton 500	PT515-51-765U	NH.Q4WAA.002	Intel Core i7-8750H	6	2.2	32 GB	RTX 2080	8 GB	1 TB SSD	3000	4	15.6	x								
Triton 500	PT515-51-73DS	NH.Q50EU.019	Intel Core i7-9750H	6	2.2	16 GB	RTX 2060	6 GB	512 GB SSD	2000	4	15.6	x								
Triton 300	PT315-53-7100	NH.QDSED.00G	i7-11800H	8	2.3	32 GB	RTX 3070	8 GB	1 TB SSD	3000	4	15.6		Helios 700	Triton 500 SE	PT516-51s-78HX	NH.QAKED.01A	i7-11800H	RTX 3080	16	x
PT516-52s-70CH	NH.QFQEK.001	i7-12700H	14	8	2.3	32 GB	2.2	8 GB	1 TB SSD	RTX 3070 Ti	4	3000	x	Helios 700	Triton 500 SE					16	
PT516-52s-99EL	NH.QFRAA.003	i9-12900H	14	1.8	RTX 3080 Ti	32 GB	16 GB	8 GB	1 TB SSD	1 TB SSD	4		x	Helios 700	Triton 500 SE					16	
Triton 300 SE	PT314-51s-76QN		Intel Core i7-11375H	4	2.2	32 GB	16 GB	RTX 3050 Ti	4 GB	512 SSD	4		14	x							
17 X	GX-792-77BL	NH.Q1FAA.001	Intel Core i7-7820HK	4	2.9	32 GB	GTX 1080	8 GB	1 TB + 512 GB SSD	3000	4	5	17.3								
17 X	GX-792-7448	NH.Q1EAA.003	Intel Core i7-7700HQ	4	2.8	16 GB	GTX 1080	8 GB	1 TB + 256 GB SSD	2500		5	17.3								
17	G9-793-79V5	NH.Q1TAA.001	Intel Core i7-7700HQ	4	2.8	16 GB	GTX 1070	8 GB	1 TB + 256 GB SSD	2000		5	17.3								
17	G9-793-74VG	NH.Q17SA.007	Intel Core i7-6700HQ	4	2.8	16 GB	GTX 1070	8 GB	1 TB + 256 GB SSD	1500		5	17.3								
17	G5-793-79SG	NH.Q1XAA.003	Intel Core i7-7700HQ	4	2.8	16 GB	GTX 1060	6 GB	1 TB HDD	1300		5	17.3								
15	G9-593-71EH	NH.Q1ZAA.001	Intel Core i7-7700HQ	4	2.8	16 GB	GTX 1070	8 GB	1 TB + 256 GB SSD	2000	15.6	5									
15	G9-593-77WF	NH.Q16AA.001	Intel Core i7-6700HQ	4	2.6	16 GB	GTX 1070	8 GB	1 TB + 256 GB SSD	2000	15.6	5									
15	G9-591-53ZU	NX.Q07ED.036	Intel Core i5-6300HQ	4	2.3	8 GB	GTX 970M	3 GB	1 TB + 128 SSD		4	15.6	x								

=== Predator Helios 300 ===
Acer Predator Helios 300
- Developer: Acer
- Manufacturer: Acer
- Type: Gaming PC
- Released: 2018
- Operating system: Windows 10
- CPU: 8th Gen Intel Core i7+
- Memory: 16 GB
- Storage: 1 TB HDD, 256 GB SSD
- Display: 15.6", 17" Full HD IPS
- Graphics: GPU1 Nvidia GeForce GTX 1060
- Sound: Two speakers
- Input: 1 HDMI port 2 USB 2.0 ports 1 USB 3.0 port 1 USB 3.1 Gen 1 port RJ-45
- Camera: Yes
- Touchpad: TouchPad
- Power: 180 W
- Weight: 6.61 lb
- Website: Acer Predator Helios 300

=== Predator Helios 300 Special Edition ===
Acer Predator Helios 300 Special Edition
- Developer: Acer
- Type: Gaming PC
- Released: 2018
- Introductory price: $1399.99
- Operating system: Windows 10
- CPU: Intel Core i7-8750H Hexa-core 2.20 GHz
- Memory: 16 GB, DDR4 SDRAM
- Storage: 256 GB SSD
- Display: 15.6" Full HD (1920 x 1080) 16:9 IPS
- Graphics: Nvidia GeForce GTX 1060 with 6 GB Dedicated Memory
- Sound: Two speakers
- Input: 1 HDMI port 2 USB 2.0 ports 1 USB 3.0 port 1 USB 3.1 Gen 1 port RJ-45
- Camera: Yes
- Touchpad: TouchPad
- Power: 180 W
- Weight: 5.95 lb
- Website: Acer Predator Helios 300 Special Edition

=== Predator Helios 500 ===
Acer Predator Helios 500
- Developer: Acer
- Type: Gaming PC
- Released: 2018
- Introductory price: $2499.99
- Operating system: Windows 10
- CPU: Intel Core i9-8950HK Hexa-core 2.90 GHz
- Memory: 16 GB, DDR4 SDRAM
- Storage: 2 TB HDD, 512 GB SSD
- Display: 17.3" Full HD (1920 x 1080) 16:9 IPS
- Graphics: Nvidia GeForce GTX 1070 with 8 GB Dedicated Memory
- Sound: Two speakers
- Input: 1 HDMI port 3 USB 3.0 ports RJ-45; 3 Thunderbolt ports 1 DisplayPort
- Camera: Yes
- Touchpad: TouchPad
- Power: 180 W
- Weight: 5.95 lb
- Website: Acer Predator Helios 300 Special Edition

=== Predator Triton 500 ===
Acer's first entry into the "Thin and light gaming laptop" Series.

Acer Predator Triton 500
- Developer: Acer
- Manufacturer: Acer
- Type: Gaming PC
- Released: 2018
- Introductory price: $2499.99
- Operating system: Windows 10
- CPU: Intel Core i5 or i7
- Memory: 8GB
- Storage: 1TB
- Display: 15.6"; Full HD (1920 x 1080) resolution
- Graphics: Nvidia GeForce RTX 2080
- Sound: Two speakers
- Input: 1 HDMI; 3 USB 3.1 Gen 1 ports RJ-45; 1 Thunderbolt; 1 DisplayPort
- Camera: Yes
- Touchpad: TouchPad
- Power: 3-cell non-removable Li-Ion battery
- Weight: 4.41 lb
- Website: Acer Predator Triton 500

=== Predator Triton 700 ===
Acer Predator Triton 700
- Developer: Acer
- Type: Gaming PC
- Released: 2018
- Introductory price: $2999.99
- Operating system: Windows 10
- CPU: Intel Core i7-7700HQ Quad-core 2.80 GHz
- Memory: 32 GB, DDR4 SDRAM
- Storage: 512 GB SSD
- Display: 15.6" Full HD (1920 x 1080) 16:9 IPS
- Graphics: Nvidia GeForce GTX 1080 with 8 GB Dedicated Memory
- Sound: Two speakers
- Input: 1 HDMI; 1 USB 2.0 port 3 USB 3.0 ports RJ-45; 1 Thunderbolt; 1 DisplayPort
- Camera: Yes
- Touchpad: TouchPad
- Power: 3-cell non-removable Li-Ion battery
- Weight: 5.29 lb (2.40 kg)
- Website: Acer Predator Triton 700

=== Predator Triton 900 ===
Acer Predator Triton 900
- Developer: Acer
- Type: 2-in-1 Gaming PC
- Released: 2019
- Operating system: Windows 10
- CPU: Intel Core i7-7700HQ Quad-core 2.80 GHz
- Memory: 32GB DDR4
- Storage: 1TB
- Display: 17.3" Full HD
- Graphics: Nvidia GeForce RTX 2080 GPU
- Sound: Two speakers
- Input: 1 HDMI; 1 USB 2.0 port 1 USB 3.0 port RJ-45; 1 Thunderbolt; 1 DisplayPort
- Camera: Yes
- Touchpad: TouchPad
- Power: 3-cell non-removable Li-Ion battery
- Website: Acer Predator Triton 900

=== Predator 21 X ===
Acer's US$8,999.99 range gaming laptop that runs as powerful as a desktop with 2 Nvidia GTX 1080 GPUs in SLI. It comes with 64 GB of RAM and 1 TB of SSD.

== Desktops ==
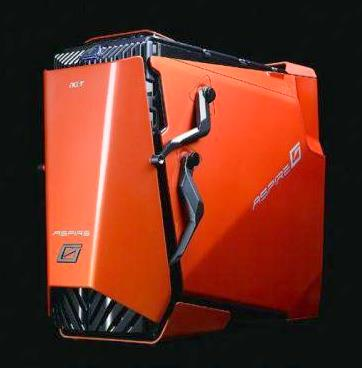
Acer Aspire Predator AG7750

- AG3620 (2012)
- AG5900 (2010)
- AG7200
- AG7700 (2009)
- AG7710 (2009)
- AG7711
- AG7712
- AG7713
- AG7750 (2010)
- AG3-710-UR53
- AG3-710-UR54
- AG6-710-70001
- AG6-710-70002
- AG6-710-70004

=== Specifications ===
Model			CPU				RAM	Graphics		Storage		MSRP (USD)
Model	Model number	Part number	Model	Cores (threads)	Base freq.	Turbo freq.	RAM	Graphics		SSD	HDD	MSRP (USD)
Predator Orion 9000	PO9-900-I9K2080Ti	UD.P02AA.059	Intel Core i9-7980XE	18 (36)	2.60 GHz	4.20 GHz	64 GB DDR4	GeForce RTX 2080 Ti	11 GB GDDR6	512 GB	2 TB	$6999.99
Predator Orion 9000	P09-600-8700K2080Ti	UD.P02AA.05A	Intel Core i7-8700K	6 (12)	3.7 GHz	4.7 GHz	32 GB DDR4	GeForce RTX 2080 Ti	11 GB GDDR6	256 GB	2 TB	$3799.99
Predator Orion 9000	PO9-900-I9KHCFF	UD.P01AA.917	Intel Core i9-7980XE	18 (36)	2.60 GHz	4.20 GHz	128 GB DDR4	Dual GeForce GTX 1080 Ti	11 GB GDDR5X	512 GB	2 TB	
Predator Orion 9000	PO9-600-I7KDCE	UD.P01AA.918	Intel Core i7-8700K	6 (12)	3.7 GHz	4.7 GHz	16 GB DDR4	GeForce GTX 1080 Ti	11 GB GDDR5X	256 GB	2 TB	
Predator Orion 9000	PO9-600-I7KFCF1080TI	UD.P01AA.919	Intel Core i7-8700K	6 (12)	3.7 GHz	4.7 GHz	32 GB DDR4	GeForce GTX 1080 Ti	11 GB GDDR5X	512 GB	2 TB	
Predator Orion 5000	P05-610-UR14	DG.E0QAA.004	Intel Core i7-8700K	6 (12)	3.7 GHz	4.7 GHz	16 GB DDR4	GeForce GTX 1080	8 GB GDDR5X	512 GB	None	$2099.99
Predator Orion 5000	P05-610-UR13	DG.E0QAA.003	Intel Core i7-8700K	6 (12)	3.7 GHz	4.7 GHz	16 GB DDR4	GeForce GTX 1070	8 GB GDDR5	512 GB	None	$1999.99
Predator Orion 5000	P05-610-UR12	DG.E0QAA.002	Intel Core i7-8600K	6 (6)	3.6 GHz	4.3 GHz	16 GB DDR4	GeForce GTX 1070	8 GB GDDR5	512 GB	None	
Predator Orion 5000	P05-610-UR11	DG.E0QAA.001	Intel Core i7-8600K	6 (6)	3.6 GHz	4.3 GHz	16 GB DDR4	GeForce GTX 1060	6 GB GDDR5	256 GB	None	
Predator Orion 3000	PO3-600-UR20	UD.P02AA.057	Intel Core i7-9700K	8 (8)	3.6 GHz	4.9 GHz	16 GB DDR4	GeForce RTX 2080	8 GB GDDR6	256 GB	1 TB	$2299.99
Predator Orion 3000	PO3-600-UD14	DG.E1BAA.005	Intel Core i7-8700	6 (12)	3.2 GHz	4.6 GHz	16 GB DDR4	GeForce RTX 2060	6 GB GDDR6	256 GB	2 TB	$1899.99
Predator Orion 3000	PO3-600-UD15	DG.E1BAA.006	Intel Core i5-9400F	6 (6)	2.9 GHz	4.1 GHz	8 GB DDR4	GeForce RTX 2060	6 GB GDDR6	256 GB	1 TB	$1599.99
Predator Orion 3000	PO3-600-UR1C	DG.E1BAA.011	Intel Core i7-9700	8 (8)	3.0 GHz	4.7 GHz	16 GB DDR4	GeForce GTX 1660 Ti	6 GB GDDR6	512 GB	1 TB	$1299.99
Predator Orion 3000	PO3-600-UR1A	DG.E1BAA.008	Intel Core i5-9400F	6 (6)	2.9 GHz	4.1 GHz	8 GB DDR4	GeForce GTX 1660 Ti	6 GB GDDR6	256 GB	1 TB	$999.99
Predator Orion 3000	PO3-600-UR13	DG.E11AA.004	Intel Core i7-8700K	6 (12)	3.7 GHz	4.7 GHz	16 GB DDR4	GeForce GTX 1060	6 GB GDDR5	256 GB	1 TB	$899.99
Predator Orion 3000	PO3-600-UR18	DG.E11AA.012	Intel Core i5-8400	6 (6)	2.8 GHz	4.0 GHz	8 GB DDR4 + 16 GB Optane	GeForce GTX 1060	6 GB GDDR5	None	1 TB	$899.99

Name	Model number	Released	Image
Predator G6	?	?	
Predator G5	AG5xxx	2011	
Predator G3	?	?	
Predator G1	?	?	

== Tablets ==
- Predator 8

== Monitors ==
=== Specifications ===
Name	Model number	Part number	Size	Resolution	Aspect ratio	Technology		I/O	Nvidia G-Sync	Refresh rate		Color supported	Contrast ratio	Brightness	Image
Name	Model number	Part number	Size	Resolution	Aspect ratio	Panel	Backlight	I/O	Nvidia G-Sync	Standard	Overclock	Color supported	Contrast ratio	Brightness	Image
Predator X35	X35 BMIPHZX	UM.CX0AA.004	35"	3440 x 1440 pixel	21:9	?	LED	1x USB; 1x HDMI 1x DP	Yes	180 Hz	200 Hz	1.07 billion (10-Bit)	2500:1	1000 nits	
Predator X34	X34	UM.CX1AA.A01	34"	3440 x 1440 pixel	21:9	IPS	LED	1x HDMI 1x DP	Yes	60 Hz	100 Hz	1.07 billion (10-bit)	?	300 nits	
Predator Z35	Z35	UM.CZ0AA.001	35"	2560 x 1080 pixel	21:9	PVA	LED	1x HDMI 1x DP	Yes	144 Hz	200 Hz	16.7 million (8-bit)	3000:1	300 nits	
Predator Z35	Z35P	UM.CZ1AA.P01	35"	3440 x 1440 pixel	21:9	PVA	LED	1x HDMI 1x DP	Yes	100 Hz	120 Hz	16.7 million (8-bit)	2500:1	300 nits	
Predator XB2	XB252Q	UM.KX2AA.001	24.5"	1920 x 1080 pixel	16:9	TN Film	?	1xHDMI 1x DP	Yes	240 Hz	N/A	16.7 million (8-bit)	1000:1	400 nits	
Predator XB1	XB321HK BMIPHZ	UM.JX1AA.001	32"	3840 x 2160 pixel	?	IPS	?	?	?	?	?	?	?	350 nits	
Predator Z1	Z271T	UM.HZ1AA.T02	?	?	?	?	?	?	?	?	?	?	?	?	
?	Z271T	UM.HZ1AA.T01	?	?	?	?	?	?	?	?	?	?	?	?	
