= Dell G Series =

Series of gaming computers

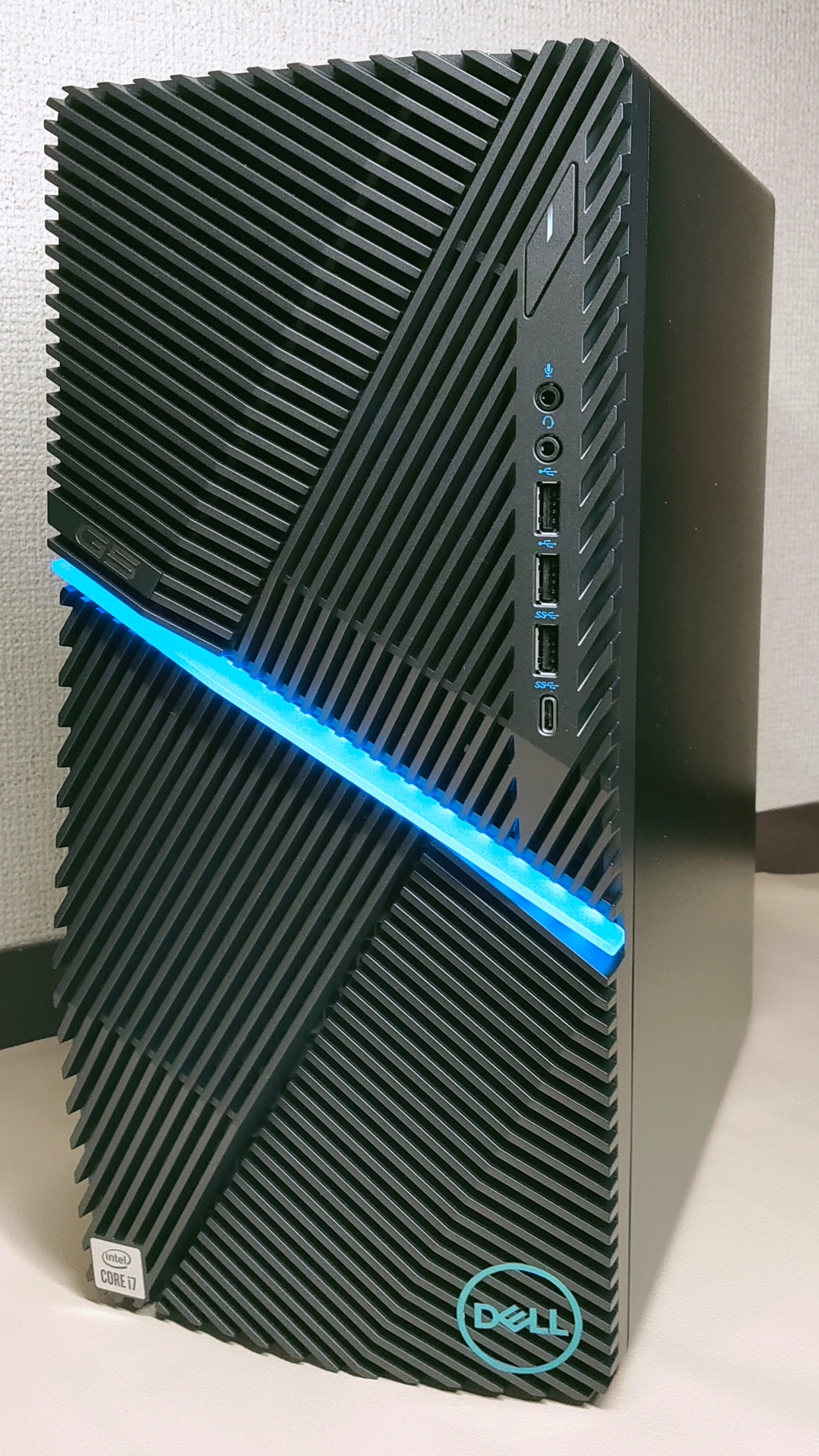
G5 Desktop Series

The Dell G Series is a discontinued line of budget gaming laptop and desktop computers by Dell. It is the former successor to the Dell Inspiron Gaming Series (Pandora). It was launched in April 2018. The G series was positioned below Alienware and competed with Lenovo's LOQ, Acer's Nitro, and HP's Victus.

During CES 2019, Dell updated the G3, G5, and G7. The G7 is now available in both 15-inch and 17-inch screen. Other upgrades includes a 144 Hz refresh rate for the display with G-SYNC support and the inclusion of RGB keyboard. A G5 SE (special edition) was also announced during the trade show and differs from the regular G5 by being finished in alpine white and having a portion of the bottom panel transparent.

The 2019 models were the last Dell G-series laptops to ship with a 1 TB 5400 rpm SATA disk drive from the factory.

Dell released the G15 series of laptops in 2021. The G15 laptops are the highest performing variants in the G-series with some units having specifications comparable to Alienware models.

In January 2025, Dell announced a major restructuring that saw the demise of the G series brand, along with others.

== Specifications ==
For many computers for Microsoft's Windows operating system, many configurations exist.

The Dell G5 (5587) and G7 (7588) shared the same chassis with the Dell Inspiron 15 7000 Gaming (7567) and Dell Inspiron 15 7000 Gaming (7577).

| Model | Release date | CPU | Memory | Primary Storage Unit | Secondary Storage Unit* | Graphics | Screen** | Video camera | Audio | Wi-Fi & Bluetooth | Peripheral connections | Battery (non-removable) | Operating System |
=== G3 Series ===
| 3579 | Apr 2018 | Intel Coffee Lake 8th gen.: 2.3 GHz quad-core Core i5-8300H, up to 4.0 GHz, 8 MB L3 cache; 2.2 GHz hexa-core Core i7-8750H, up to 4.1 GHz, 9 MB L3 cache | 8 or 16 GB DDR4 RAM, 2666 MHz (2 slots, up to 32 GB) | 1 TB 5400 RPM 2.5" SATA HDD | N/A | Intel UHD Graphics 620 (only available for G3 3579); NVIDIA GeForce GTX 1050 with 4 GB of GDDR5 memory; GeForce GTX 1050 Ti with 4 GB of GDDR5 memory; GeForce GTX 1060 Max-Q with 6 GB of GDDR5 memory | 15.6", 1920×1080 (16:9), 141 ppi, IPS Anti-Glare LED-Backlit | | | | | 56 Whr, 4-Cell | Windows 10 |
| 3779 | Apr 2018 | Intel Coffee Lake 8th gen.: 2.3 GHz quad-core Core i5-8300H, up to 4.0 GHz, 8 MB L3 cache; 2.2 GHz hexa-core Core i7-8750H, up to 4.1 GHz, 9 MB L3 cache | 8 or 16 GB DDR4 RAM, 2666 MHz (2 slots, up to 32 GB) | 128 GB / 256 GB M.2 PCIe NVMe SSD | 1 TB 5400 rpm 2.5" SATA HDD | Intel UHD Graphics 620 (only available for G3 3579); NVIDIA GeForce GTX 1050 with 4 GB of GDDR5 memory; GeForce GTX 1050 Ti with 4 GB of GDDR5 memory; GeForce GTX 1060 Max-Q with 6 GB of GDDR5 memory | 17.3", 1920×1080 (16:9), 127 ppi, IPS Anti-Glare LED-Backlit | | | | | 56 Whr, 4-Cell | Windows 10 |
| 3590 | Sep 2019 | Intel Coffee Lake 9th gen.: 2.4 GHz quad-core Core i5-9300H, up to 4.1 GHz, 8 MB L3 cache; 2.5 GHz hexa-core Core i7-9750H, up to 4.5 GHz, 12 MB L3 cache | 8 or 16 GB DDR4 RAM, 2666 MHz (2 slots, up to 32 GB) | 128 GB / 256 GB / 512 GB M.2 PCIe NVMe SSD | 1 TB 5400 rpm 2.5" SATA HDD | NVIDIA: GeForce GTX 1050 with 3 GB GDDR5 memory; GeForce GTX 1650 with 4 GB GDDR5 memory; GeForce GTX 1660 Ti Max-Q with 6 GB GDDR6 memory | 15.6", 1920×1080 (16:9), IPS Anti-Glare LED-Backlit | | | Qualcomm DW1810 802.11ac Wi-Fi + Bluetooth 4.1 | | 51 Whr, 3-Cell | Windows 10 |
| 3500 | 2020 | 2.5 GHz quad-core Core i5-10300H, up to 4.5 GHz, 8 MB L3 cache; 2.6 GHz hexa-core Core i7-8850H, up to 4.3 GHz, 12 MB L3 cache; 2.6 GHz hexa-core Core i7-10750H, up to 5 GHz, 12 MB L3 cache | 8 or 16 GB DDR4 2933 MHz | 256 GB / 512 GB M.2 PCIe NVMe SSD | | NVIDIA: GeForce GTX 1650 with 4 GB GDDR6 memory; GeForce GTX 1660 Ti with 6 GB GDDR6 memory; GeForce RTX 2060 with 6 GB GDDR6 memory | 15.6", 1920×1080 | | | | | 51 Whr, 3-cell | Windows 10 |
| === G5 Series === | | | | | | | | | | | | | |
| 5587 | Apr 2018 | Intel Coffee Lake 8th gen.: 2.3 GHz quad-core Core i5-8300H, up to 4.0 GHz, 8 MB L3 cache; 2.2 GHz hexa-core Core i7-8750H, up to 4.1 GHz, 9 MB L3 cache | 8 GB or 16 GB DDR4 2666 MHz | 128 GB / 256 GB M.2 PCIe NVMe SSD | 1 TB 5400 rpm 2.5" SATA | NVIDIA GeForce GTX 1050 with 4 GB of GDDR5 memory; GeForce GTX 1050 Ti with 4 GB of GDDR5 memory; GeForce GTX 1060 Max-Q with 6 GB of GDDR5 memory | 15.6", 1920×1080 (16:9), 141 ppi, IPS Anti-Glare LED-Backlit | | | | | 56 WHr, 4-Cell | Windows 10 |
| 5590 | Jan 2019 Jun 2019 (9th gen. processors) | Intel Coffee Lake 8th gen.: 2.3 GHz quad-core Core i5-8300H, up to 4.0 GHz, 8 MB L3 cache; 2.2 GHz hexa-core Core i7-8750H, up to 4.1 GHz, 9 MB L3 cache.; Intel Coffee Lake 9th gen.: 2.4 GHz quad-core Core i5-9300H, up to 4.1 GHz, 8 MB L3 cache; 2.5 GHz hexa-core Core i7-9750H, up to 4.5 GHz, 12 MB L3 cache | 8 GB or 16 GB DDR4 2666 MHz | 128 GB / 256 GB / 512 GB M.2 PCIe NVMe SSD | 1 TB 5400 rpm 2.5" SATA | NVIDIA GeForce GTX 1050 Ti with 4 GB of GDDR5 memory; GeForce GTX 1650 with 4 GB of GDDR5 memory; GeForce GTX 1660 Ti with 6 GB of GDDR5 memory; GeForce RTX 2060 with 6 GB of GDDR6 memory; GeForce RTX 2070 with 8 GB of GDDR6 memory | 15.6", 1920×1080 (16:9), 141 ppi, IPS Anti-Glare LED-Backlit | | | 802.11ac WiFi + Bluetooth 4.2 | | 60 WHr, 4-Cell | Windows 10 |
| 5590 SE | Jan 2019 Jun 2019 (9th gen. processors) | Intel Coffee Lake 8th gen.: 2.3 GHz quad-core Core i5-8300H, up to 4.0 GHz, 8 MB L3 cache; 2.2 GHz hexa-core Core i7-8750H, up to 4.1 GHz, 9 MB L3 cache.; Intel Coffee Lake 9th gen.: 2.4 GHz quad-core Core i5-9300H, up to 4.1 GHz, 8 MB L3 cache; 2.5 GHz hexa-core Core i7-9750H, up to 4.5 GHz, 12 MB L3 cache | 8 GB or 16 GB DDR4 2666 MHz | 128 GB / 256 GB / 512 GB M.2 PCIe NVMe SSD | 1 TB 5400 rpm 2.5" SATA | NVIDIA: GeForce GTX 1650 with 4 GB of GDDR5 memory; GeForce GTX 1660 Ti with 6 GB of GDDR6 memory; GeForce RTX 2060 with 6 GB of GDDR6 memory | 15.6", 1920×1080 (16:9), IPS Anti-Glare LED-Backlit | | | 802.11ac WiFi + Bluetooth 4.2 | | 60 WHr, 4-Cell | Windows 10 |
| SE (AMD) | 2020 | AMD Ryzen: 2.9 GHz hexa-core Ryzen 7 4800H, up to 4.2 GHz, 8 MB L3 cache | 8 GB or 16 GB DDR4 3200 MHz | 512 GB / 1 TB M.2 PCIe NVMe SSD | | AMD Radeon RX 5600M | | | | | | | Windows 10 |
| | 2020 | 2.5 GHz quad-core Core i5-10300H, up to 4.5 GHz, 8 MB L3 cache; 2.6 GHz hexa-core Core i7-10750H, up to 5.0 GHz, 12 MB L3 cache | 8 GB or 16 GB DDR4 2933 MHz | 256 GB / 512 GB M.2 PCIe NVMe SSD | | NVIDIA: GeForce GTX 1650 Ti with 4 GB of GDDR6 memory; GeForce GTX 1660 Ti with 6 GB of GDDR6 memory; GeForce RTX 2070 with 8 GB of GDDR6 memory | 15.6", 1920×1080 | | | | | | Windows 10 |
| === G15 Series === | | | | | | | | | | | | | |
| 5510 | 2021 | Intel Comet Lake 10th gen.: 2.40 GHz quad-core Core i5-10200H, up to 4.10 GHz, 8 MB cache; 2.20 GHz octa-core Core i7-10870H, up to 5 GHz, 16 MB cache | 4 GB, 8 GB or 16 GB DDR4 RAM, 2933 MHz (2 slots, up to 32 GB) | Up to 2 TB M.2 PCIe NVMe SSD | | NVIDIA: GeForce GTX 1650 with 4 GB of GDDR6 memory; GeForce RTX 3050 with 4 GB of GDDR6 memory; GeForce RTX 3050 Ti with 4 GB of GDDR6 memory; GeForce RTX 3060 with 6 GB of GDDR6 memory | 15.6", 1920×1080, IPS Anti-Glare LED-Backlit, Refresh Rate:(120 Hz,165 Hz, 144 Hz) | | | | | | Windows 10 |
| 5511 | 2021 | Intel Tiger Lake 11th gen.: 2.10 GHz hexa-core Core i5-11260H, up to 4.40 GHz, 12 MB cache; 2.20 GHz hexa-core Core i5-11400H, up to 4.50 GHz, 12 MB cache; 2.30 GHz octa-core Core i7-11800H, up to 4.60 GHz, 24 MB cache | 4 GB, 8 GB or 16 GB DDR4 RAM, 3200 MHz (2 slots, up to 32 GB) | Up to 2 TB M.2 PCIe NVMe SSD | | NVIDIA: GeForce RTX 3050 with 4 GB of GDDR6 memory; GeForce RTX 3050 Ti with 4 GB of GDDR6 memory; GeForce RTX 3060 with 6 GB of GDDR6 memory | 15.6", 1920×1080, IPS Anti-Glare LED-Backlit, Refresh Rate:(120 Hz,165 Hz, 360 Hz) | | | | | | Windows 10 |
| 5515 (AMD) | 2021 | AMD Ryzen: 3.3 GHz hexa-core Ryzen 7 5600H, up to 4.2 GHz, 16 MB L3 cache; 3.2 GHz octa-core Ryzen 7 5800H, up to 4.4 GHz, 16 MB L3 cache | 4 GB, 8 GB or 16 GB DDR4 RAM, 3200 MHz (2 slots, up to 32 GB) | Up to 2 TB M.2 PCIe NVMe SSD | | NVIDIA: GeForce RTX 3050 with 4 GB of GDDR6 memory; GeForce RTX 3050 Ti with 4 GB of GDDR6 memory; GeForce RTX 3060 with 6 GB of GDDR6 memory | 15.6", 1920×1080, IPS Anti-Glare LED-Backlit, Refresh Rate:(120 Hz,165 Hz,144 Hz) | | | | | | Windows 10 |
| 5520 | 2022 | Intel Alder Lake 12th gen.: 12-core Core i5-12500H, up to 4.50 GHz, 18 MB cache; 14-core Core i7-12700H, up to 4.70 GHz, 24 MB cache | 8 GB, 16 GB or 32 GB DDR5 RAM, 4800 MHz (2 slots, up to 32 GB) | Up to 2 TB M.2 PCIe NVMe SSD | | NVIDIA: GeForce RTX 3050 with 4 GB of GDDR6 memory; GeForce RTX 3050 Ti with 4 GB of GDDR6 memory; GeForce RTX 3060 with 6 GB of GDDR6 memory; GeForce RTX 3070 Ti with 8 GB of GDDR6 memory | 15.6", 1920×1080, IPS Anti-Glare LED-Backlit, Refresh Rate:(120 Hz,165 Hz) OR 15.6", 2560 x 1440, IPS Anti-Glare LED-Backlit, Refresh Rate:(240 Hz) | | | | | | Windows 11 |
| === G5 Desktop Series === | | | | | | | | | | | | | |
| DT | 2020 | 3.6 GHz quad-core Core i3-10100, up to 4.3 GHz, 6 MB L3 cache; 2.9 GHz hexa-core Core i5-10400F, up to 4.3 GHz, 12 MB L3 cache; 2.9 GHz octa-core Core i7-10700F, up to 4.8 GHz, 16 MB L3 cache | 8 GB DDR4 2666 MHz or 16 GB DDR4 2933 MHz | 1 TB 7200 RPM 3.5" SATA or 128 GB / 256 GB M.2 PCIe NVMe SSD | 1 TB 7200 rpm 3.5" SATA | NVIDIA: GeForce GTX 1650 SUPER with 4 GB of GDDR6 memory; GeForce GTX 1660 SUPER with 6 GB of GDDR6 memory; GeForce GTX 1660 Ti with 6 GB of GDDR6 memory; GeForce RTX 2060 with 6 GB of GDDR6 memory | N/A | N/A | | N/A | N/A | N/A | Windows 10 |
| === G7 Series === | | | | | | | | | | | | | |
| 7588 | Apr 2018 | Intel Coffee Lake 8th gen.: 2.3 GHz quad-core Core i5-8300H, up to 4.0 GHz, 8 MB L3 cache; 2.2 GHz hexa-core Core i7-8750H, up to 4.1 GHz, 9 MB L3 cache; 2.9 GHz hexa-core Core i9-8950HK, up to 4.8 GHz, 12 MB L3 cache | 8 or 16 GB DDR4 RAM, 2666 MHz (2 slots, up to 32 GB) | 128 GB / 256 GB / 512 GB M.2 PCIe NVMe SSD | 1 TB 5400 rpm 2.5" SATA | NVIDIA: GeForce GTX 1050 with 4 GB of GDDR5 memory; GeForce GTX 1050 Ti with 4 GB of GDDR5 memory; GeForce GTX 1060 Max-Q with 6 GB of GDDR5 memory | 15.6", 1920×1080 (16:9), 141 ppi, IPS Anti-Glare LED-Backlit | 720p webcam | | WLAN: 802.11ac + Bluetooth 5.0, Dual Band 2.4&5 GHz, MU-MIMO/160 MHz, 2x2 | 1x HDMI 2.0; 3x USB 3.1 Gen 1 Type-A including 1 with PowerShare; 1x Thunderbolt 3 Port (USB 3.1 Gen 2 Type-C with support for 40 Gbps Thunderbolt and DisplayPort); 1x 2-in-1 SD (UHS50) / MMC, RJ-45; 1x Headphone/Mic | 56 WHr, 4-Cell | Windows 10 |
| 7590 | Jan 2019 Jun 2019 (9th gen. processors) | Intel Coffee Lake 8th gen.: 2.3 GHz quad-core Core i5-8300H, up to 4.0 GHz, 8 MB L3 cache; 2.2 GHz hexa-core Core i7-8750H, up to 4.1 GHz, 9 MB L3 cache; Intel Coffee Lake 9th gen.: 2.4 GHz quad-core Core i5-9300H, up to 4.1 GHz, 8 MB L3 cache; 2.5 GHz hexa-core Core i7-9750H, up to 4.5 GHz, 12 MB L3 cache; 2.3 GHz octa-core Core i9-9880H, up to 4.8 GHz, 16 MB L3 cache (only available for G7 7790) | 8 or 16 GB DDR4 RAM, 2666 MHz (2 slots, up to 32 GB) | 128 GB / 256 GB / 512 GB M.2 PCIe NVMe SSD | 1 TB 5400 rpm 2.5" SATA | NVIDIA: GeForce GTX 1650 with 4 GB of GDDR5 memory; GeForce GTX 1660 Ti with 6 GB of GDDR5 memory; GeForce RTX 2060 with 6 GB of GDDR6 memory; GeForce RTX 2080 with 8 GB of GDDR6 memory | 15.6", 1920×1080 (16:9), 141 ppi, 300-nits, IPS Anti-Glare LED-Backlit | | | | | 60 WHr, 4-Cell | Windows 10 |
| 7790 | Jan 2019 Jun 2019 (9th gen. processors) | Intel Coffee Lake 8th gen.: 2.3 GHz quad-core Core i5-8300H, up to 4.0 GHz, 8 MB L3 cache; 2.2 GHz hexa-core Core i7-8750H, up to 4.1 GHz, 9 MB L3 cache; Intel Coffee Lake 9th gen.: 2.4 GHz quad-core Core i5-9300H, up to 4.1 GHz, 8 MB L3 cache; 2.5 GHz hexa-core Core i7-9750H, up to 4.5 GHz, 12 MB L3 cache; 2.3 GHz octa-core Core i9-9880H, up to 4.8 GHz, 16 MB L3 cache (only available for G7 7790) | 8 or 16 GB DDR4 RAM, 2666 MHz (2 slots, up to 32 GB) | 128 GB / 256 GB / 512 GB M.2 PCIe NVMe SSD | 1 TB 5400 rpm 2.5" SATA | NVIDIA: GeForce GTX 1660 Ti with 6 GB of GDDR5 memory; GeForce RTX 2060 with 6 GB of GDDR6 memory; GeForce RTX 2070 with 8 GB of GDDR6 memory; GeForce RTX 2080 with 8 GB of GDDR6 memory | 17.3", 1920×1080 (16:9), 127 ppi, 300-nits, IPS Anti-Glare LED-Backlit | | | | | 60 WHr, 4-Cell | Windows 10 |
| 7500, 7700 | 2020 | 2.6 GHz hexa-core Core i7-10750H, up to 5.0 GHz, 12 MB L3 cache; 2.4 GHz octa-core Core i9-10885H, up to 5.3 GHz, 16 MB L3 Cache | 16 GB or 32 GB DDR4 2933 MHz | 256 GB / 512 GB / 1 TB M.2 PCIe NVMe SSD | | NVIDIA: GeForce GTX 1660 Ti with 6 GB of GDDR6 memory; GeForce RTX 2070 with 8 GB of GDDR6 memory; GeForce RTX 2070 Super with 8 GB of GDDR6 memory | 15.6" (7500 model), 1920×1080 17.3" (7700 model), 1920×1080 | | | WLAN: Killer Wi-Fi 6 AX1650 (2x2) 802.11ax Wireless and Bluetooth 5.1 | | 68 Whr, 4-Cell | Windows 10 |

* Secondary Storage Unit may not be included.

**Some G5 and G7 model variations are equipped with 4K/UHD displays, or with displays with G-Sync feature supporting 144 Hz refresh rate.

***Some G7 model variations are equipped with a 90 Wh, 6-cell battery but lack an HDD.

== Reception ==
The reception for the Dell G3 has been mixed. Digital Trends gave the Dell G3 a rating 3.5 out of 5 stars with a rating of 7.0. TechRader gave the Dell G3 a rating of 4 out of 5 stars. Laptop Mag gave the Dell G3 3 out of 5 stars. YouTuber Dave Lee gave the G3 a negative review due to its poor thermal performance; while it didn't thermal throttle, it did produce high temperatures under load.

Reception for the Dell G7 has been generally positive. Laptop Mag gave the Dell G7 3.5 out of 5 stars, while PC World gave the Dell G7 4 out of 5 stars. Wired gave the Dell G7 a rating of 7 out of 10. Dave Lee gave the Dell G7 a positive review.

=== Lawsuits ===
In October 2020, a law firm advocating for consumer rights claimed to be investigating Dell based on multiple reports of overheating in the G3 and G5 Series laptops. Issues such as screen stuttering and battery failure were prominent. As a resort, users would attempt to alleviate the heat using a variety of makeshift methods, but this would significantly decrease performance of the hardware as a gaming device. The law firm filed a suit on the basis of deceptive trade practice, but this has yet to appear in court.
