= Danny Lui =

Hong Kong entrepreneur and venture capitalist

- 呂譚平
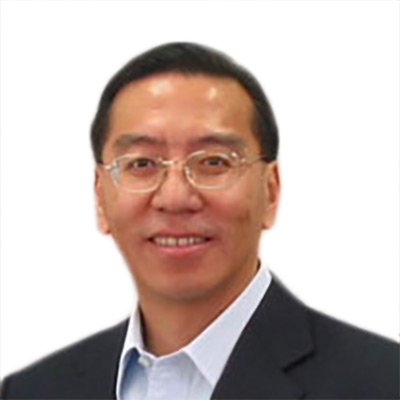
- Danny Lui
- Born: 7 January 1957; Hong Kong, China
- Died: 1 July 2012 (aged 55)
- Education: Imperial College London
- Occupations: Entrepreneur and venture capitalist
- Known for: Co-founding computer company Lenovo

Danny Lui (Chinese: 呂譚平; 7 January 1957 – 1 July 2012) was a Hong Kong entrepreneur and venture capitalist. He is best-known for co-founding Lenovo.

He graduated from Imperial College London with a degree in Computer Science before returning to Hong Kong and winning the Hong Kong Young Industrialist Award in 1992. He also had a network of venture capital companies investing in technology start-ups on both sides of the Pacific and maintained working relationships with governments in China and Hong Kong.

== Early life ==
Lui was born in January 1957 in Hong Kong to a relatively poor working-class family and for the duration of his early life, he began to develop an interest and passion for computers.

In the late 1970s, he graduated from Imperial College London with a Bachelor's Degree in Computer Science.

== Career ==
Following his graduation, he worked for a London-based firm building software applications for other companies. In 1982, Danny returned to Hong Kong and started his first business, Daw Computer Systems, Ltd. Seven years later, he teamed up with China Academy of Sciences' Institute of Computing and co-founded the Legend Holdings, known as Lenovo in Hong Kong, which in December 2004 acquired the PC Division of IBM for $1.7 billion.

In 1994, Lui led Legend (Lenovo) through a successful IPO on the Hong Kong Stock Exchange and the company became the largest PC manufacturer in China.

Three years later, Lui founded APTG Ventures, his first venture fund focusing on high-tech investments in Silicon Valley and China. The fund has since been received with relative success, having identified star companies with strong exit records and profitable returns through IPOs as well as mergers and acquisitions.

In 2000, Lui established his second fund, Authosis which focused on both Information Technology and semiconductor industry and invested mainly in early-stage software and fabless integrated circuit design companies targeting the internet, e-commerce, Wireless and mobile solutions, consumer electronics, computing and communication markets.

Five years later in 2005, Lui co-founded a new venture fund, Startup Capital Ventures, with John Dean, former chairman and CEO of Silicon Valley Bank, and several other partners. The fund emphasizes on investing early-stage companies in Silicon Valley and China.

== Death ==
Lui died of cancer on 1 July 2012 aged 55.
