= Lenovo =

Chinese multinational technology company

Lenovo Group Limited
- Lenovo's official logo since 2015

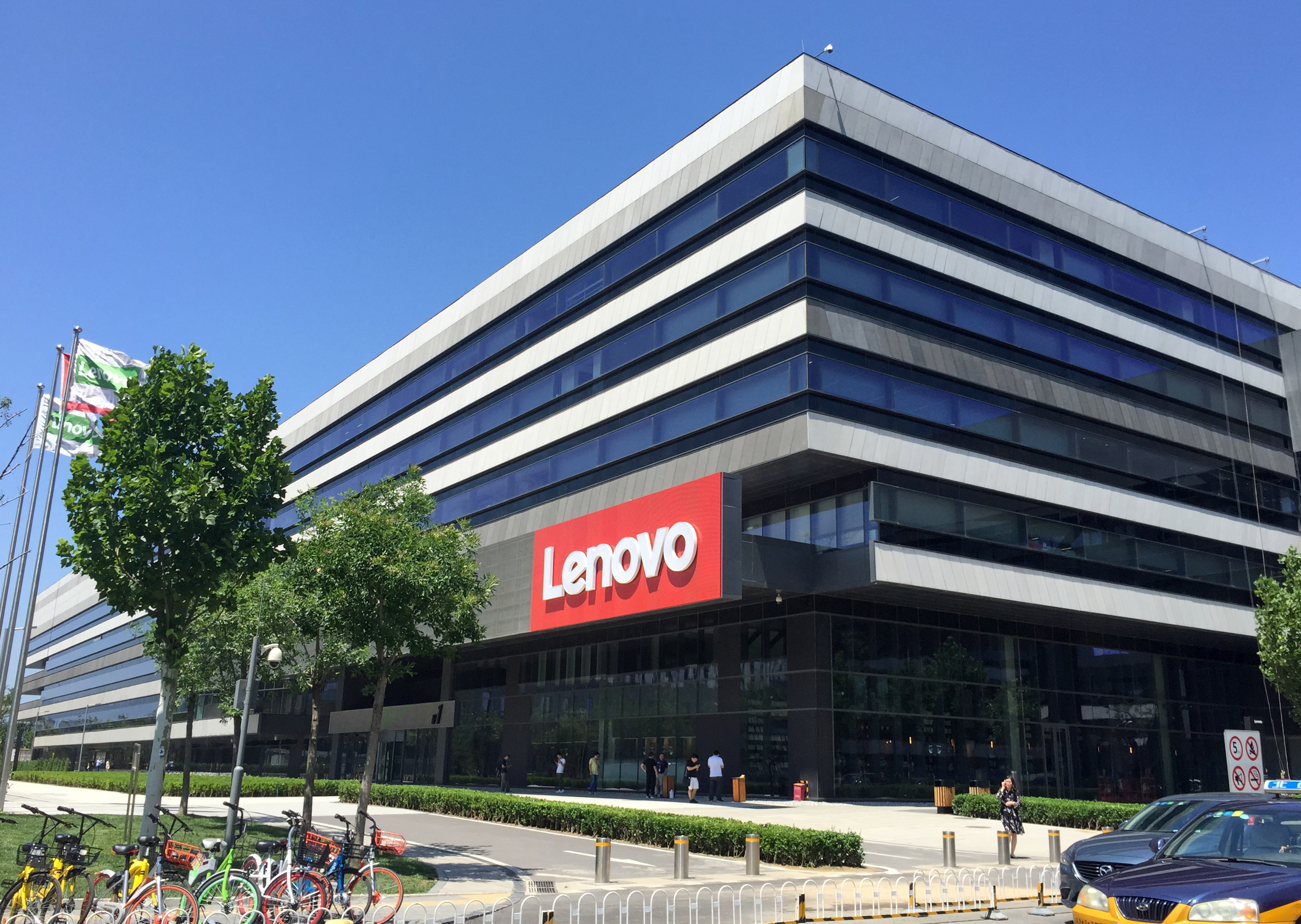
- Headquarters in Haidian, Beijing, China
- Native name: 联想集团有限公司
- Romanized name: Liánxiǎng Jítuán Yǒuxiàn Gōngsī
- Type: Public
- Traded as: SEHK: 992
- Industry: Information technology; Computer hardware; Consumer electronics
- Founded: 1 November 1984; 42 years ago (as Legend 联想); Beijing, China
- Founder: Liu Chuanzhi; Danny Lui
- Headquarters: Hong Kong (registered office); Beijing, China, and Morrisville, North Carolina, United States (global headquarters)
- Area served: Worldwide
- Key people: Yang Yuanqing (chairman & CEO); Matthew Zielinski (president of international markets); Winston Cheng (CFO) Tolga Kurtoglu (CTO)
- Products: Personal computers; Tablet computers; Smartphones; Workstations; Servers; Supercomputers; Data storage devices; Computer monitors and peripherals; Smart devices
- Services: IT systems integration; Managed services; Cloud computing; IT as a service
- Revenue: ▲US$69.077 billion (2024/25)
- Operating income: ▲US$2.164 billion (2024/25)
- Net income: ▲US$1.462 billion (2024/25)
- Total assets: ▲US$44.231 billion (2024/25)
- Total equity: ▲US$6.660 billion (2024/25)
- Owner: Legend Holdings (31.41%)
- Number of employees: 72,000 (31 March 2025)
- Subsidiaries: Motorola Mobility; Medion
- Website: www.lenovo.com

Lenovo Group Limited, trading as Lenovo (/ləˈnoʊvoʊ/ lə-NOH-voh, Chinese: 联想; pinyin: Liánxiǎng), is a Hong Kong–based Chinese multinational corporation and technology company specializing in designing, manufacturing, and marketing consumer electronics, personal computers, software, servers, converged and hyperconverged infrastructure solutions, and related enterprise infrastructure services. Its current smartphone brand is Motorola, while its former smartphone brands were Lenovo Vibe and ZUK Mobile. Its global headquarters are in Beijing, China, and Morrisville, North Carolina, in the United States; it has research centers at these locations, elsewhere in mainland China, Hong Kong and Taiwan, in Stuttgart, Germany, and in Yamato, Kanagawa, Japan.

Lenovo originated as an offshoot of a state-owned research institute. Then known as Legend and distributing foreign IT products, co-founder Liu Chuanzhi incorporated Legend in Hong Kong in an attempt to raise capital and was successfully permitted to build computers in China, helped by the American company AST Research. Legend listed on the Hong Kong Stock Exchange in 1994 and became the largest PC manufacturer in China and eventually in Asia; they were also domestic distributors for HP printers, Toshiba laptops, and others. After the company rebranded itself to Lenovo, it merged with IBM's PC business which produced its ThinkPad line in 2005, after which it rapidly expanded abroad. In 2013, Lenovo became the world's largest personal computer vendor by unit sales for the first time, a position it still holds as of 2024.

Products manufactured by the company include desktop computers, laptops, tablet computers, smartphones, workstations, servers, supercomputers, data storage devices, IT management software, and smart televisions. Its best-known brands include its ThinkPad business line of notebooks, the IdeaPad, Yoga, LOQ, and Legion consumer lines of notebooks, and the IdeaCentre, LOQ, Legion, and ThinkCentre lines of desktops. Lenovo is also part of a joint venture with NEC, named Lenovo NEC Holdings, that produces personal computers for the Japanese market. The company also operates Motorola Mobility, which produces smartphones.

== Etymology ==
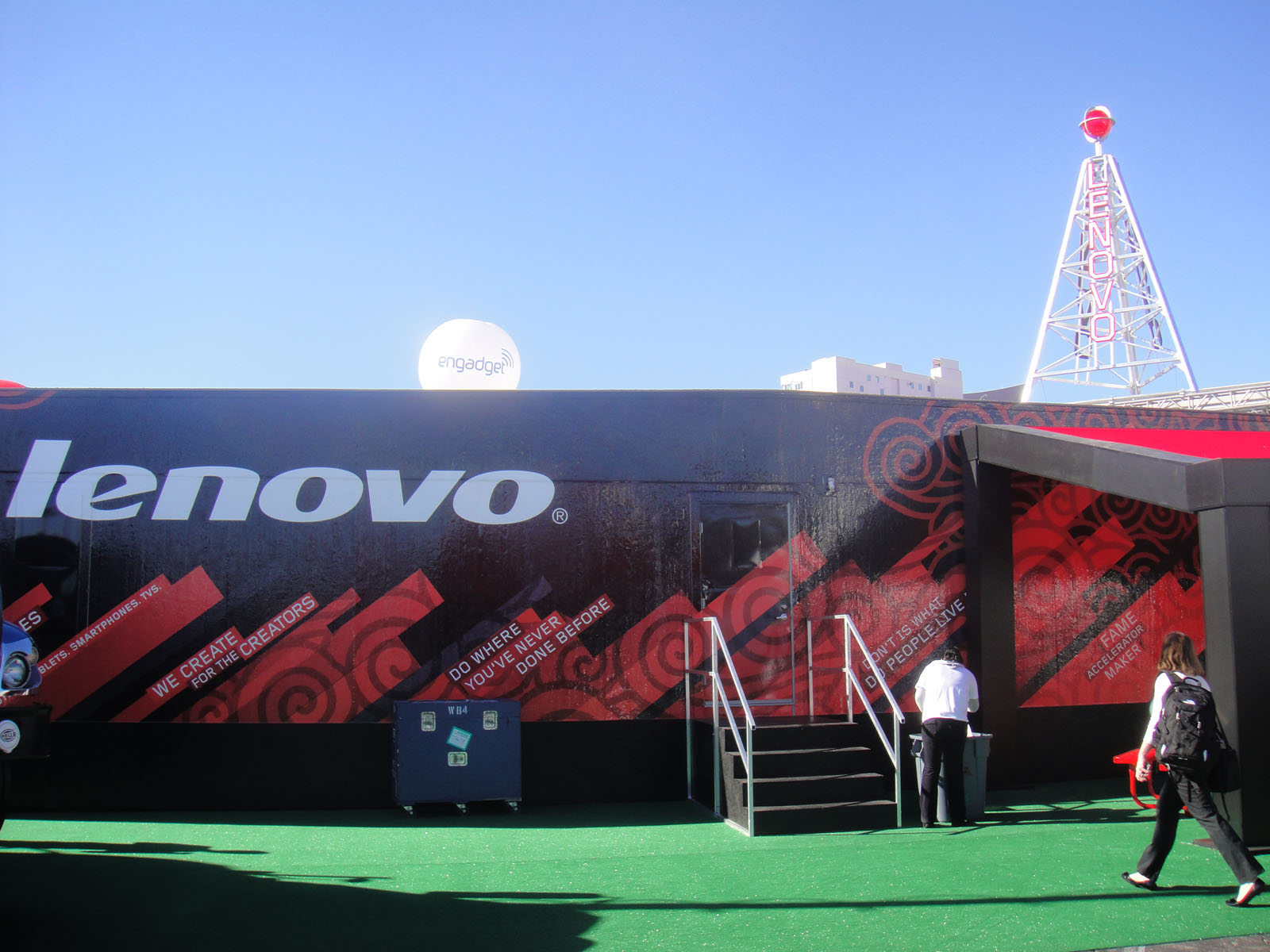
Lenovo advertisement at the Consumer Electronics Show, 2012

"Lenovo" is a portmanteau of "Le-" (from Legend) and "novo", Latin ablative for "new". The Chinese name (simplified Chinese: 联想; traditional Chinese: 聯想; pinyin: Liánxiǎng) means "association" (as in "association of ideas"), "associative thinking", or "connected thinking". It also implies creativity. "Lianxiang" was first used to refer to a layout of Chinese typewriters in the 1950s organized into groups of common words and phrases rather than the standard dictionary layout.

For the first 20 years of its existence, the company's English name was "Legend". In 2002, Yang Yuanqing decided to abandon the Legend English name to expand beyond the Chinese home market. "Legend" was already in use worldwide by many businesses, making it impossible to register in many jurisdictions outside China. In April 2003, the company publicly announced its new English name, "Lenovo", with an advertising campaign including huge billboards and primetime television ads. Lenovo spent 18 million CNY on an eight-week television advertising campaign. The billboards showed the Lenovo logo against blue sky with a slogan that read, "Transcendence depends on how you think." By the end of 2003, Lenovo had spent a total of 200 million CNY on rebranding.

== History ==
=== 1984–1993: Founding and early history ===
Lenovo was founded in Beijing on 1 November 1984 as Legend by a team of engineers led by Liu Chuanzhi and Danny Lui. Initially specializing in televisions, the company migrated towards manufacturing and marketing computers.

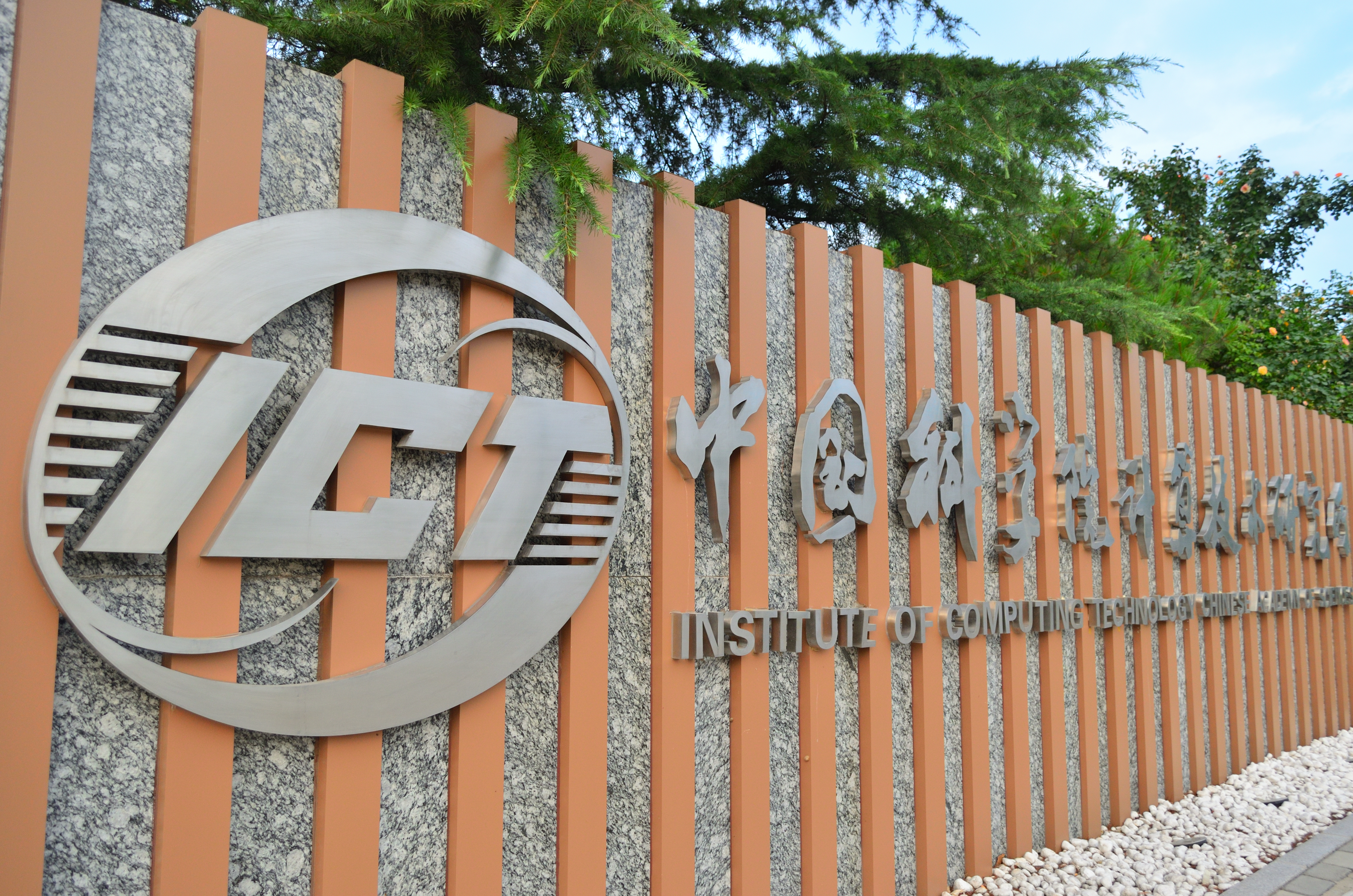
In 1984, Lenovo was founded in Beijing by a team of eleven engineers from the Institute of Computing Technology of the Chinese Academy of Sciences (CAS), led by Liu Chuanzhi.

Liu Chuanzhi and his group of ten experienced engineers, teaming up with Danny Lui, officially founded Lenovo in Beijing on 1 November 1984, with 200,000 yuan. The Chinese government approved Lenovo's incorporation on the same day. Jia Xufu (贾续福), one of the founders of Lenovo, indicated that the first meeting in preparation for starting the company was held on 17 October the same year. Eleven people, the entirety of the initial staff, attended. Each of the founders was a member of the Institute of Computing Technology of the Chinese Academy of Sciences (CAS). The 200,000 yuan used as start-up capital was approved by Zeng Maochao (曾茂朝). The name for the company agreed upon at this meeting was the Chinese Academy of Sciences Computer Technology Research Institute New Technology Development Company.

The organizational structure of the company was established in 1985 after the Chinese New Year. It included technology, engineering, administrative, and office departments. The group first attempted to import televisions but failed. It rebuilt itself as a company doing quality checks on computers. It also tried and failed to market a digital watch.

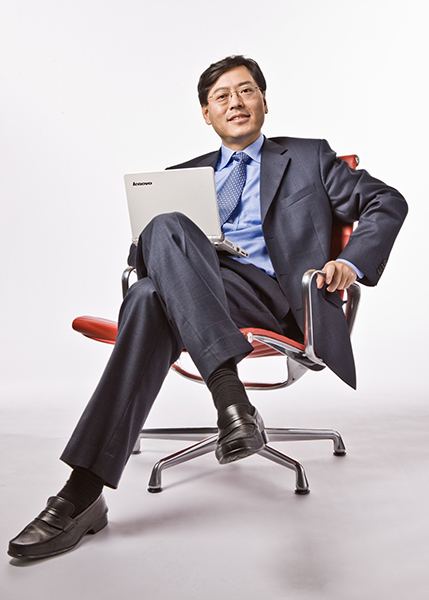
Yang Yuanqing in 2008

In May 1988, Lenovo placed its first recruitment advertisement on the front page of the China Youth News. Such ads were quite rare in China at the time. Out of the 500 respondents, 280 were selected to take a written employment exam. 120 of these candidates were interviewed in person. Although interviewers initially only had the authority to hire 16 people, 58 were given offers. The new staff included 18 people with graduate degrees, 37 with undergraduate degrees, and three students with no university-level education. Yang Yuanqing, the current chairman and CEO of Lenovo, was among that group.

Liu Chuanzhi received government permission to form a subsidiary in Hong Kong and to move there along with five other employees. Liu's father, already in Hong Kong along with Lui, furthered his son's ambitions through mentoring and facilitating loans. Liu moved to Hong Kong in 1987. To save money during this period, Liu and his co-workers walked instead of taking public transportation. To keep up appearances, they rented hotel rooms for meetings.

In 1990, Lenovo started to manufacture and market computers using its own brand name. Some of the company's early successes included the KT8920 mainframe computer. It also developed a circuit board that allowed IBM-compatible personal computers to process Chinese characters.

=== 1994–1998: IPO, second offerings and bond sales ===
Lenovo (known at the time as Legend) became publicly traded after a 1994 Hong Kong IPO that raised nearly US$30 million at HK$1.33 per share. Prior to the IPO, many analysts were optimistic about Lenovo. On its first day of trading, the company's stock price hit a high of HK$2.07 and closed at HK$2.00 suggesting an initial under-valuing of the company. Proceeds from the offering were used to finance sales offices in Europe, North America and Australia, to expand and improve production and research and development, and to increase working capital.

By 1996, Lenovo was the market leader in China and began selling its own laptop. By 1998 it held 43 per cent of the domestic computer market share in China, selling approximately one million computers.

Lenovo released its Tianxi (天禧) computer in 1998. Designed to make it easy for inexperienced Chinese consumers to use computers and access the internet, one of its most important features was a button that instantly connected users to the internet and opened the Web browser. It was co-branded with China Telecom and it was bundled with one year of Internet service. The Tianxi was released in 1998. It was the result of two years of research and development. It had a pastel-colored, shell-shaped case and a seven-port USB hub under its screen. As of 2000, the Tianxi was the best-selling computer in Chinese history. It sold more than 1,000,000 units in 2000 alone.

=== 1999–2010: Merger with the IBM Personal Systems Group and sale of smartphone division ===
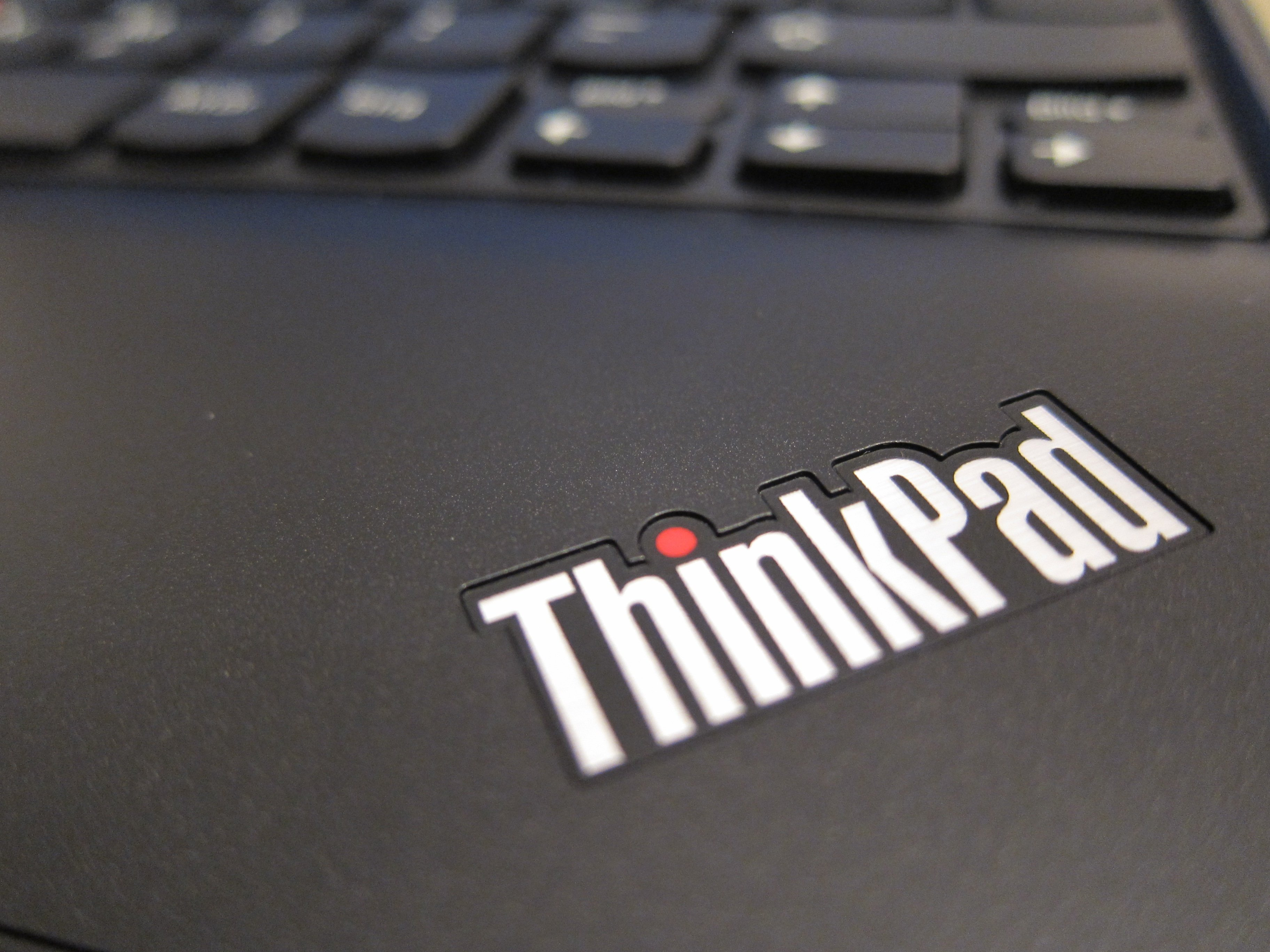
The ThinkPad logo, as seen on the Lenovo ThinkPad X100e laptop computer. Lenovo purchased the ThinkPad line from IBM in 2005.

To fund its continued growth, Lenovo issued a secondary offering of 50 million shares on the Hong Kong market in March 2000 and raised about US$212 million. It rebranded to the name Lenovo in 2003 and began making acquisitions to expand the company.

Lenovo established a new holding company in 2005 through a two-way merger between it and IBM's personal computer business, the latter that had originally manufactured the ThinkPad laptop and ThinkCentre desktop lines. Lenovo's acquisition of IBM's personal computer division accelerated access to foreign markets while improving Lenovo's branding and technology. Lenovo paid US$1.25 billion for IBM's computer business and assumed an additional US$500 million of IBM's debt. This acquisition made Lenovo the third-largest computer maker worldwide by volume. Lenovo's purchase of the Think line from IBM also led to the creation of the IBM/Lenovo partnership, which works together in the creation of Think-line of products sold by Lenovo.

On the purchase of IBM's personal computer division, Chuanzhi said in 2012: "We benefited in three ways from the IBM acquisition. We got the ThinkPad brand, IBM's more advanced PC manufacturing technology and the company's international resources, such as its global sales channels and operation teams. These three elements have shored up our sales revenue in the past several years." The employees of the division, including those who developed ThinkPad laptops and ThinkCentre desktops, became employees of Lenovo.

Despite Lenovo acquiring the "Think" brand from IBM, IBM still plays a key indirect, background role in the design and production of the Think line of products. Today, IBM is responsible for overseeing servicing and repair centers, and is considered an authorized distributor and refurbisher of the Think line of products produced by Lenovo.

IBM also acquired an 18.9% share of Lenovo in 2005 as part of Lenovo's purchase of IBM's personal computing division. In the years following the deal, IBM sold its stake in Lenovo, with a final sale in 2011 completing its divestment.

Mary Ma, Lenovo's chief financial officer from 1990 to 2007, was in charge of investor relations. Under her leadership, Lenovo successfully integrated Western-style accountability into its corporate culture. Lenovo's emphasis on transparency earned it a reputation for the best corporate governance among mainland Chinese firms. While Hong Kong-listed firms were only required to issue financial reports twice per year, Lenovo followed the international norm of issuing quarterly reports. Lenovo created an audit committee and a compensation committee with non-management directors. The company started roadshows twice per year to meet institutional investors. Ma organized the first-ever investor relations conference held in mainland China. The conference was held in Beijing in 2002 and televised on China Central Television (CCTV). Liu and Ma co-hosted the conference and both gave speeches on corporate governance.

Lenovo sold its smartphone and tablet division in 2008 for US$100 million in order to focus on personal computers and then paid US$200 million to buy it back in November 2009. As of 2009, the mobile division ranked third in terms of unit share in China's mobile handset market. Lenovo invested CN¥100 million in a fund dedicated to providing seed funding for mobile application development for its LeGarden online app store. As of 2010, LeGarden had more than 1,000 programs available for the LePhone. At the same time, LeGarden counted 2,774 individual developers and 542 developer companies as members.

=== 2011–2013: Re-entering smartphone market and other ventures ===
On 27 January 2011, Lenovo formed a joint venture to produce personal computers with Japanese electronics firm NEC. The companies said in a statement that they would establish a new company called Lenovo NEC Holdings, to be registered in the Netherlands. NEC received US$175 million in Lenovo stock. Lenovo was to own a 51% stake in the joint venture, while NEC would have 49%. Lenovo has a five-year option to expand its stake in the joint venture.

This joint venture was intended to boost Lenovo's worldwide sales by expanding its presence in Japan, a key market for personal computers. NEC spun off its personal computer business into the joint venture. As of 2010, NEC controlled about 20% of Japan's market for personal computers while Lenovo had a 5% share. Lenovo and NEC also agreed to explore cooperating in other areas such as servers and tablet computers.

Roderick Lappin, chairman of the Lenovo–NEC joint venture, told the press that the two companies will expand their co-operation to include the development of tablet computers.

In June 2011, Lenovo announced that it planned to acquire control of Medion, a German electronics manufacturing company. Lenovo said the acquisition would double its share of the German computer market, making it the third-largest vendor by sales (after Acer and Hewlett-Packard). The deal, which closed in the third quarter of the same year, was claimed by The New York Times as "the first in which a Chinese company acquired a well-known German company."

This acquisition gave Lenovo 14% of the German computer market. Gerd Brachmann, chairman of Medion, agreed to sell two-thirds of his 60 per cent stake in the company. He was paid in cash for 80 per cent of the shares and received 20 per cent in Lenovo stock. That gave him about one percent of Lenovo. In 2025, Lenovo completed its acquisition of all remaining shares in Medion.

In September 2012, Lenovo agreed to acquire the Brazil-based electronics company Digibras, which sells products under the brand-name CCE, for a base price of R$300 million (US$148 million) in a combination of stock and cash. An additional payment of R$400 million was made dependent upon performance benchmarks. Prior to its acquisition of CCE, Lenovo already established a $30 million factory in Brazil, but Lenovo's management had felt that it needed a local partner to maximize regional growth. Lenovo cited its desire to take advantage of increased sales due to the 2014 World Cup that would be hosted by Brazil and the 2016 Summer Olympics and CCE's reputation for quality. Following the acquisition, Lenovo announced that its subsequent acquisitions would be concentrated in software and services.

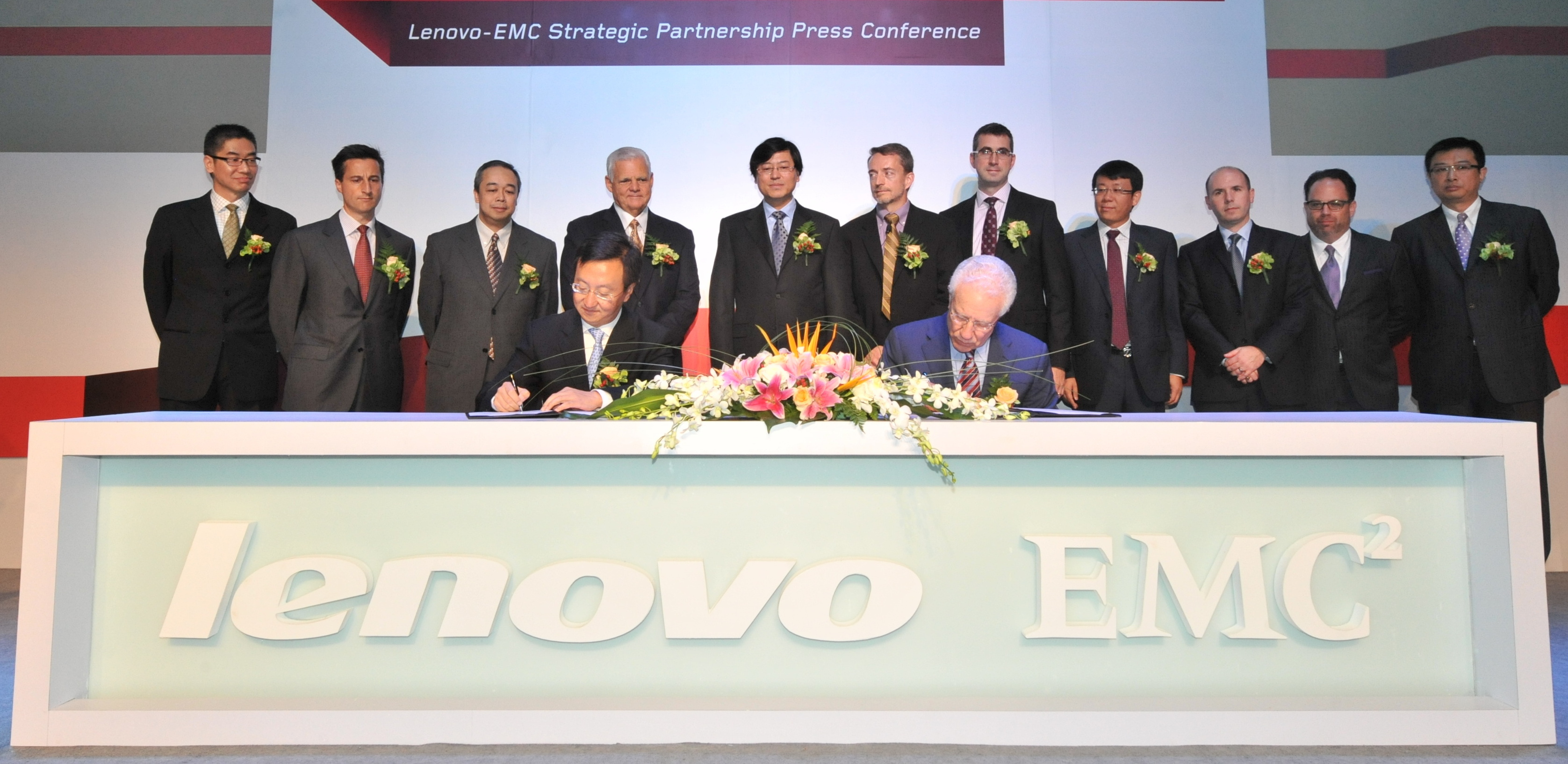
The signing ceremony for the LenovoEMC joint venture, with Yang Yuanqing standing in the middle (fifth from the left) in the back row

In September 2012, Lenovo agreed to acquire the United States–based software company Stoneware, in its first software acquisition. The transaction was expected to close by the end of 2012; no financial details have been disclosed. Lenovo said that the company was acquired in order to gain access to new technology and that Stoneware is not expected to significantly affect earnings. More specifically, Stoneware was acquired to further Lenovo's efforts to improve and expand its cloud-computing services. For the two years prior to its acquisition, Stoneware partnered with Lenovo to sell its software. During this period Stoneware's sales doubled. Stoneware was founded in 2000. As of September 2012, Stoneware is based in Carmel, Indiana, and has 67 employees.

Lenovo re-entered the smartphone market in 2012 and quickly became the largest vendor of smartphones in mainland China. Entry into the smartphone market was paired with a change of strategy from "the one-size-fits-all" to a diverse portfolio of devices. These changes were driven by the popularity of Apple's iPhone and Lenovo's desire to increase its market share in mainland China. Lenovo surpassed Apple Inc. to become the No. 2 provider of smartphones in the domestic Chinese market in 2012. However, with approximately 100 smartphone brands sold in China, this only equated to a 10.4% market share.

In May 2012, Lenovo announced an investment of US$793 million in the construction of a mobile phone manufacturing and R&D facility in Wuhan, Hubei.

In 2013, Lenovo created a joint venture with EMC named Iomega. The venture took over Iomega's business and rebranded all of Iomega's products under the LenovoEMC brand, and designed products for small and medium-sized businesses that could not afford enterprise-class data storage. Lenovo has since retired all of the LenovoEMC products on its product page advising that the products are no longer available for purchase on lenovo.com.

=== Since 2014: Purchase of IBM server lines and other acquisitions ===
Corporate logo (1984–2003)

Corporate logo, designed by FutureBrand (2003–2015)

Corporate logo (2015–present)

IBM sold its x86-based server lines, including System x and Blade Center, to Lenovo in 2014. Lenovo says it would gain access to more enterprise customers, improve its profit margins, and develop a closer relationship with Intel, the maker of most server processors, through its acquisition of IBM's x86-based server business. On 1 October 2014, Lenovo closed its acquisition of IBM's server division, with the final price put at $2.1 billion. Lenovo said this acquisition came in at a price lower than the previously announced $2.3 billion partially because of a change in the value of IBM inventories. The deal was already approved by Europe and China. Per Forbes, the United States Department of Treasury Committee on Foreign Investment in the United States (CFIUS) was reportedly the last major hurdle for Lenovo, since the United States had the strictest policies.

After closing, Lenovo said that its goal was to become the world's largest maker of servers. Lenovo also announced plans to start integrating IBM's workforce. The acquisition added about 6,500 new employees to Lenovo. Lenovo said that it has no immediate intent to cut jobs. Lenovo said that positions in research and development and customer-facing roles such as marketing would be "100% protected", but expected "rationalization" of its supply chain and procurement.

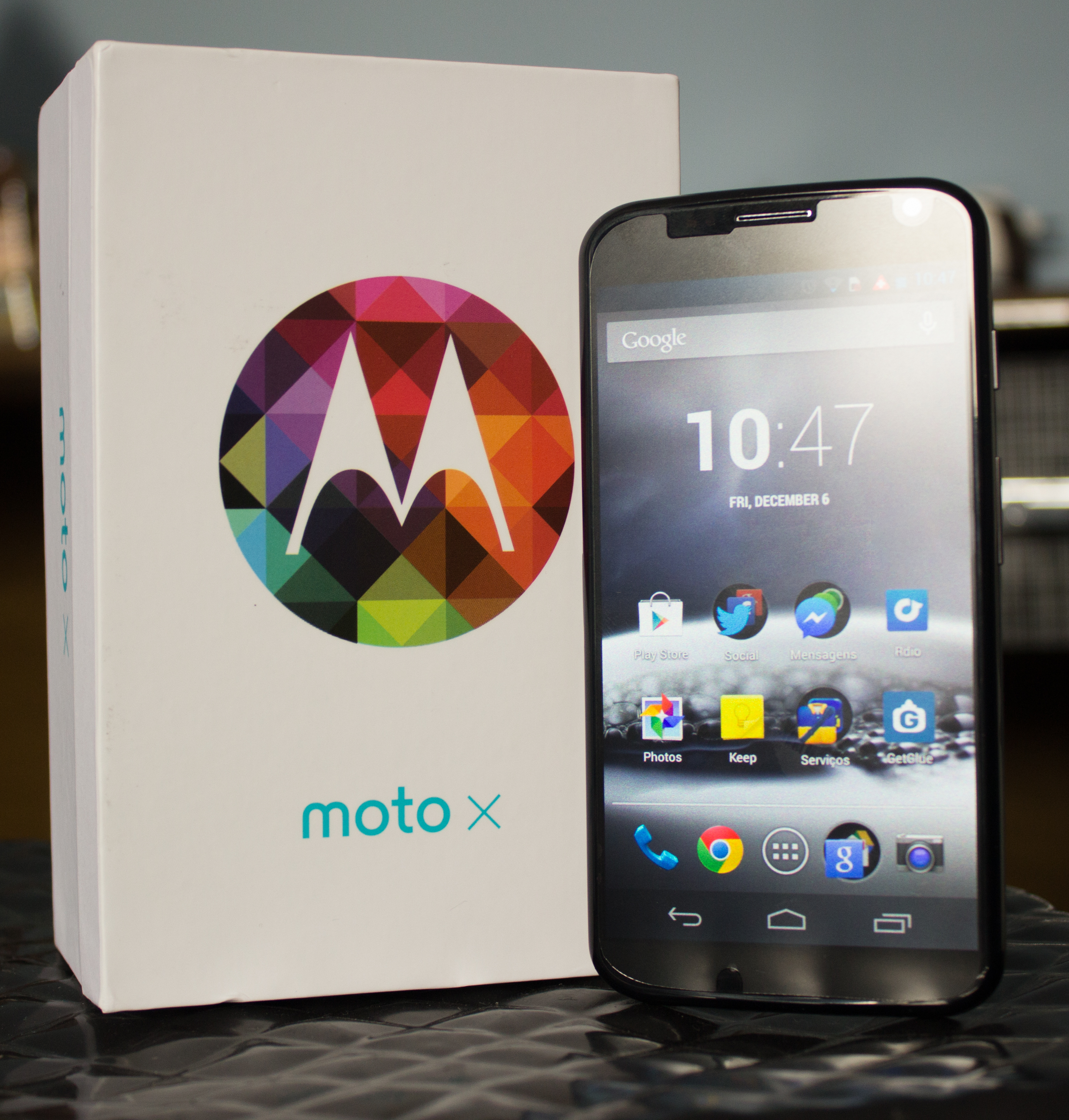
Motorola Moto X

On 29 January 2014, Google announced it would sell Motorola Mobility to Lenovo for US$2.91 billion. As of February 2014, Google owned about 5.94% of Lenovo's stock. The deal included smartphone lines like the Moto X, Moto G, Droid Turbo, and the future Motorola Mobility product roadmap, while Google retained the Advanced Technologies & Projects unit and all but 2,000 of the company's patents. Lenovo received royalty free licenses to all the patents retained by Google. Lenovo received approval from the European Union for its acquisition of Motorola in June 2014. The acquisition was completed on 30 October 2014. Motorola Mobility remained headquartered in Chicago, and continued to use the Motorola brand, but Liu Jun, president of Lenovo's mobile device business, became the head of the company.

In April 2014, Lenovo purchased a portfolio of patents from NEC related to mobile technology. These included over 3,800 patent families in countries around the world. The purchase included standards-essential patents for 3G and LTE cellular technologies and other patents related to smartphones and tablets.

In May 2015, Lenovo revealed a new logo at Lenovo Tech World in Beijing, with the slogan "Innovation Never Stands Still" (Chinese: 创新无止境). Lenovo's new logo, created by Saatchi, can be changed by its advertising agencies and sales partners, within restrictions, to fit the context. It has a lounging "e" (similar to the Google logo) and is surrounded by a box that can be changed to use a relevant scene, solid color, or photograph. Lenovo's Chief Marketing Officer David Roman said, "When we first started looking at it, it wasn't about just a change in typography or the look of the logo. We asked 'If we really are a net-driven, customer-centric company, what should the logo look like?' We came up with the idea of a digital logo first [...] designed to be used on the internet and adaptable to context."

In early June 2015, Lenovo announced plans to sell up to US$650 million in five-year bonds denominated in Chinese yuan. The bonds were sold in Hong Kong with coupon ranging from 4.95% to 5.05%. This is only the second sale of bonds in Lenovo's history. Financial commentators noted that Lenovo was paying a premium to list the bonds in yuan given relatively low costs for borrowing in US dollars.

Lenovo said that its x86 servers would be available to all its channel partners. Lenovo planned to cut prices on x86 products in order to gain market share. This goes in alliance with IBM's vision of the future around cloud technologies and its own POWER processor architecture.

In March 2017, Lenovo announced it was partnering with Fort Lauderdale, Florida–based software storage virtualization company DataCore to add DataCore's parallel I/O-processing software to Lenovo's storage devices. The servers were reportedly designed to outperform Storage Area Network (SAN) SAN arrays.

In 2017, Lenovo formed a joint venture with Fujitsu and the Development Bank of Japan (DBJ). In the joint venture, Fujitsu would sell Lenovo a 51% stake in Fujitsu Client Computing Limited. DBJ would acquire a 5% stake.

In September 2018, Lenovo and NetApp announced about strategic partnership and joint venture in China. As part of strategic partnership Lenovo started two new lines of storage systems: DM-Series and DE-Series. Both storage systems using Lenovo hardware and NetApp software: DM-Series using ONTAP OS and DE-Series SANtricity OS.

In 2018, Lenovo became the world's largest provider for the TOP500 supercomputers.

In 2020, Lenovo became a preferred data center innovation provider for DreamWorks Animation starting with Trolls World Tour. It would later go on to be the studio's preferred workstation partner in 2021, starting with The Bad Guys.

On 12 January 2021, Lenovo filed an application to issue Chinese depositary receipts, representing newly issued ordinary shares, and to list them on the Science and Technology Innovation Board of the Shanghai Stock Exchange.

In April 2021, Lenovo was reorganized into three divisions: The Intelligent Devices Group for PCs, Smartphones, Smart Collaboration products, Augmented and Virtual Reality solutions and Internet of Things devices, the Infrastructure Solutions Group (formally known as Data Center Group) for smart infrastructure solutions, and the Solutions and Services Group focused on services and industry-specific products. Lenovo has partnered with Absolute Security since 2015 and in 2021, Lenovo Device Intelligence became supported through Absolute's persistence technology. That year, the company hit $60 billion in annual revenues.

On 8 October 2021, Lenovo withdrew its application to list on the Shanghai Stock Exchange just days after it had been accepted by the exchange, citing the possibility of the validity of financial information in its prospectus lapsing as the reason. The price of the company's shares on the Hong Kong Stock Exchange dropped by over 17% following the news, which was its biggest intraday decline in over a decade.

== Products and services ==
Lenovo is a manufacturer of personal computers, smartphones, televisions, and wearable devices. Some of the company's earliest products included the KT8920 mainframe computer and a circuit board that allowed IBM-compatible personal computers to process Chinese characters. One of its first computers was the Tianxi (天禧), released in 1998 in the Chinese market. It became the best selling computer in Chinese history in 2000.

=== Personal and business computing ===
Lenovo markets the ThinkPad, IdeaPad, Yoga, Legion and Xiaoxin (小新; Chinese market only) lines of laptops, as well as the IdeaCentre and ThinkCentre lines of desktops. It expanded significantly in 2005 through its acquisition of IBM's personal computer business, including its ThinkPad and ThinkCentre lines. As of January 2013, shipments of THINK-branded computers have doubled since Lenovo's takeover of the brand, with profit margins thought to be above 5%. Lenovo aggressively expanded the THINK brand away from traditional laptop computers in favor of tablets and hybrid devices such as the ThinkPad Tablet 2, ThinkPad Yoga, ThinkPad 8, ThinkPad Helix, and ThinkPad Twist; the shift came as a response to the growing popularity of mobile devices, and the release of Windows 8 in October 2012. Lenovo achieved significant success with this high-value strategy and in 2013 controlled more than 40% of the market for Windows computers priced above $900 in the United States.

==== ThinkPad ====
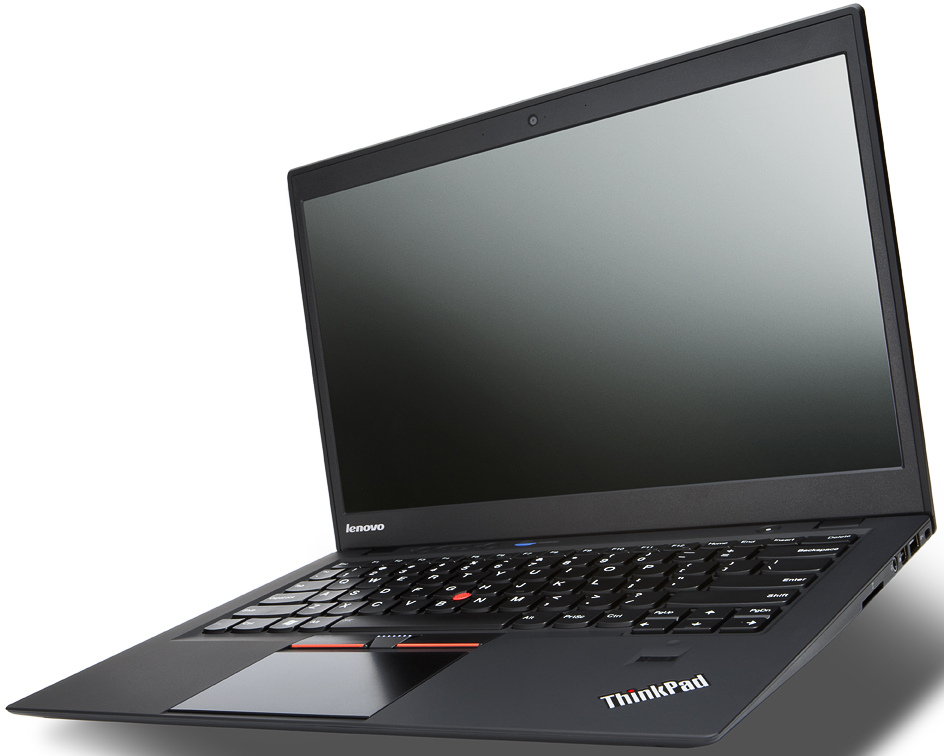
The first generation ThinkPad X1 Carbon from 2012 Ultrabook with extensive use of lightweight and durable carbon fibre technology

The ThinkPad is a line of business-oriented laptop known for their boxy black design, modeled after a traditional Japanese bento. The ThinkPad was originally an IBM product developed at the Yamato Facility in Japan by Arimasa Naitoh (内藤在正, Naitō Arimasa); they have since been developed, manufactured and sold by both IBM and Lenovo after early 2005, following its acquisition of IBM's personal computer division. The ThinkPad has been used in space and was the only laptop model certified for use on the International Space Station until 2016.

==== ThinkCentre ====
The ThinkCentre is a line of business-oriented desktop computers which was introduced in 2003 by IBM and since has been produced and sold by Lenovo since 2005. ThinkCentre computers typically include mid-range to high-end processors, options for discrete graphics cards, and multi-monitor support. Similar to the ThinkPad line of computers, there have been budget lines of ThinkCentre branded computers in the past. Some examples of this include: M55e series, A50 series, M72 series. These "budget" lines are typically "thin clients" however, meaning they are not standalone computers, rather, they are access points to a central server.

==== ThinkServer, followed by ThinkSystem ====
The ThinkServer product line began with the TS100 from Lenovo. The server was developed under an agreement with IBM, by which Lenovo would produce single-socket and dual-socket servers based on IBM's xSeries technology. An additional feature of the server design was a support package aimed at small businesses. The focus of this support package was to provide small businesses with software tools to ease the process of server management and reduce dependence on IT support.

On 20 June 2017, Lenovo's Data Center Group relaunched the ThinkServer product line as ThinkSystem, which consisted of 17 new machine type models, in the catalog formate containing form factors such as Tower, 1U/2U, Blades, Dense and 4U Mission Critical Intel-based servers. Also within this relaunch contained a portfolio of Storage Arrays and of Fibre Channel SAN Switches and Directors. To further incorporate industry-leading partnerships into its portfolio, Lenovo struck an agreement with the processor company, AMD, to be able to supply customers with a choice of options between both Intel and AMD powered appliances. In August 2019, the first two ThinkSystem platforms were introduced to the market containing a single AMD EPYC processor, the SR635 (1U) and the SR655 (2U). Again, in May 2020, Lenovo DCG further expanded its AMD offerings to incorporate 2-proc systems, the SR645 and the SR665, continuing to exemplify its approach to being the Most Trusted Data Center Advisor in the market.

==== ThinkStation ====
Lenovo ThinkStations are workstations designed for high-end computing. In 2008, IBM/Lenovo expanded the focus of its THINK brand to include workstations, with the ThinkStation S10 being the first model released.

==== ThinkVision ====
High-end monitors are marketed under the ThinkVision name. ThinkVision displays share a common design language with other THINK devices such as the ThinkPad line of laptop computers and ThinkCentre line of desktop computers. At the 2014 International CES, Lenovo announced the ThinkVision Pro2840m, a 28-inch 4K display aimed at professionals. Lenovo also announced another 28-inch 4K touch-enabled device running Android that can function as an all-in-one PC or an external display for other devices.

At the 2016 International CES, Lenovo announced two displays with both USB-C and DisplayPort connectivity. The ThinkVision X24 Pro monitor is a 24-inch 1920 by 1080 pixel thin-bezel display that uses an IPS LCD panel. The ThinkVision X1 is a 27-inch 3840 by 2160 pixel thin-bezel display that uses a 10-bit panel with 99% coverage of the sRGB color gamut. The X24 includes a wireless charging base for mobile phones. The X1 is the first monitor to receive the TUV Eye-Comfort certification. Both monitors have HDMI 2.0 ports, support charging laptops, mobile phones, and other devices, and have Intel RealSense 3D cameras in order to support facial recognition. Both displays have dual-array microphones and 3-watt stereo speakers.

==== IdeaPad ====
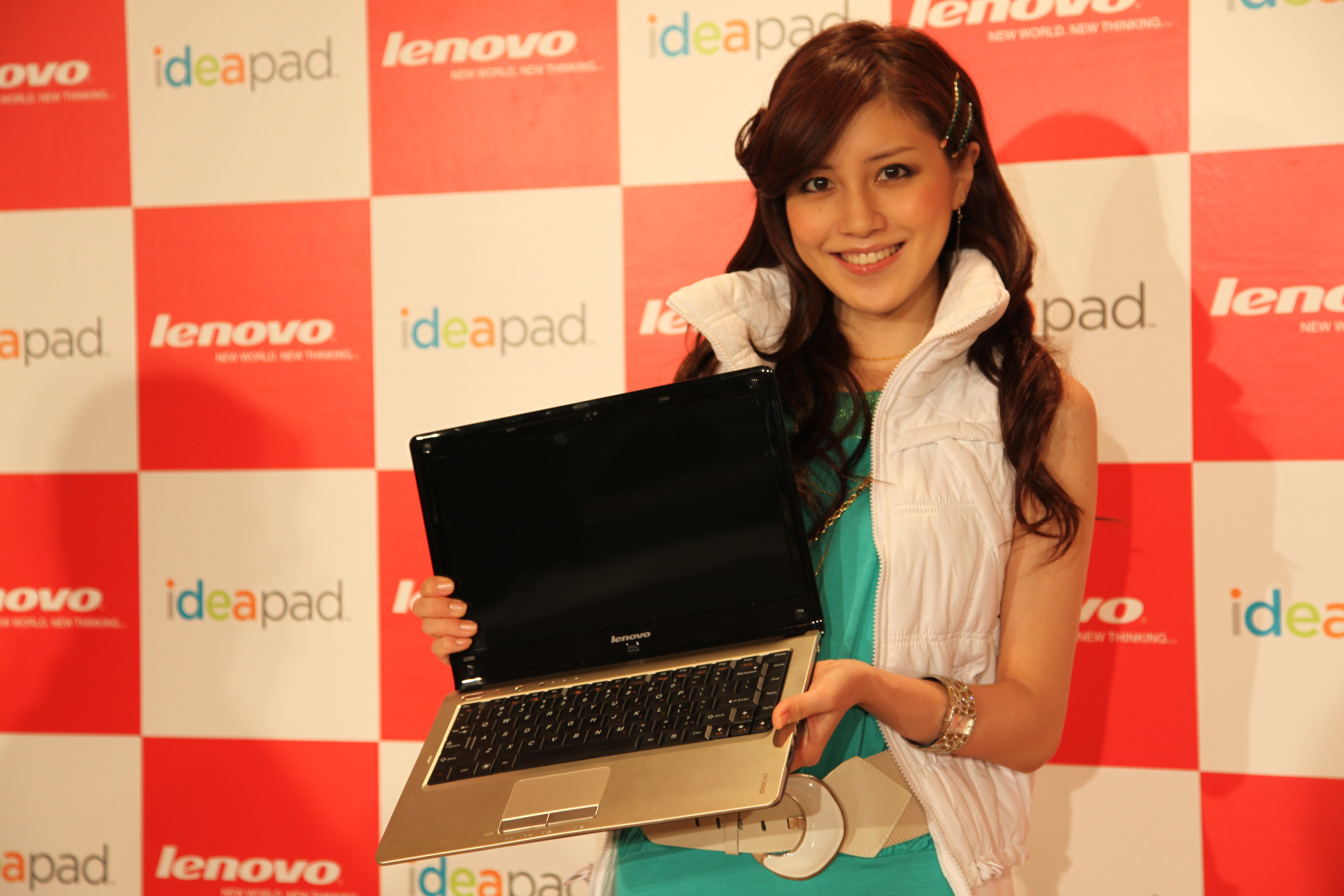
A Lenovo IdeaPad U350 at a launch event in Japan, 2009

The IdeaPad line of consumer-oriented laptops was introduced in January 2008. The IdeaPad is the result of Lenovo's own research and development; Unlike the ThinkPad line, its design and branding were not inherited from IBM nor are they designed/developed by IBM.

The IdeaPad's design language differs markedly from the ThinkPad and has a more consumer-focused look and feel.

On 21 September 2016, Lenovo confirmed that its Yoga series is not meant to be compatible with Linux operating systems, that it knows it is impossible to install Linux on some models, and that it is not supported. This came in the wake of media coverage of problems that users were having while trying to install Ubuntu on several Yoga models, including the 900 ISK2, 900 ISK For Business, 900S, and 710, which were traced back to Lenovo disabling and removing support for the AHCI storage mode for the device's Solid State Drive in the computer's BIOS, in favor of a RAID mode that is only supported by Windows 10 drivers that come with the system. Lenovo has since released an alternative firmware that has restored the AHCI mode to the drive controller to allow installation of Linux operating systems.

==== IdeaCentre ====
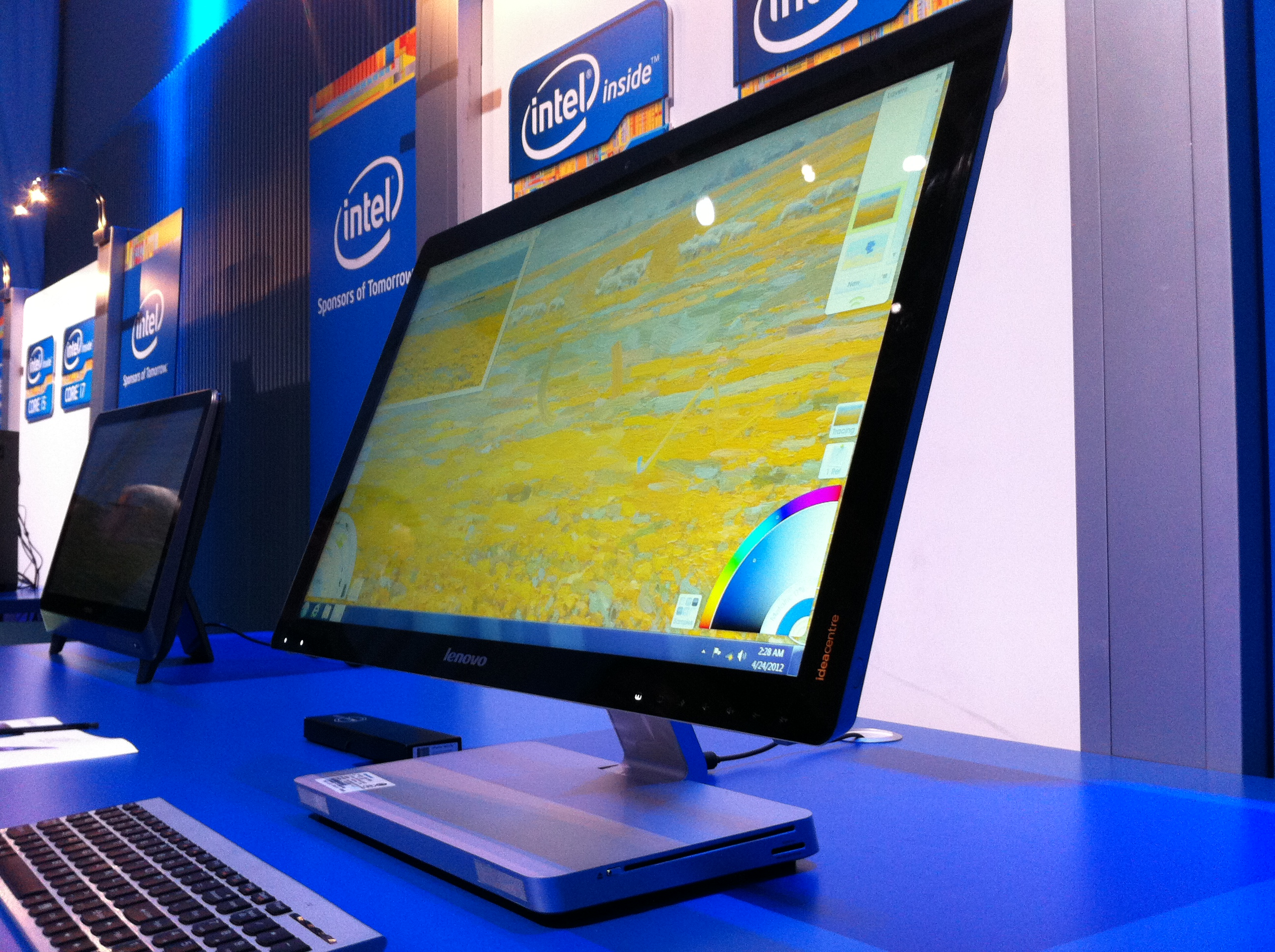
A Lenovo IdeaCentre all-in-one desktop PC

The IdeaCentre is a line of all-in-one machines, combining a processor and monitor into a single unit. The desktops were described by HotHardware as being "uniquely designed". The first IdeaCentre desktop, the IdeaCentre K210, was announced by Lenovo on 30 June 2008. While the IdeaCentre line consists only of desktops, it shares design elements and features with the IdeaPad line. One such feature was Veriface facial recognition technology.

At CES 2011, Lenovo announced the launch of four IdeaCentre desktops: the A320, B520, B320, and C205. In the autumn of 2012, the firm introduced the more powerful IdeaCentre A720, with a 27-inch touchscreen display and running Windows 8. With a TV tuner and HDMI in, the A720 can also serve as a multimedia hub or home theater PC.

In 2013, Lenovo added a table computer to the IdeaCentre line. The Lenovo IdeaCentre Horizon, introduced at the 2013 Consumer Electronics Show is a 27-inch touchscreen computer designed to lay flat for simultaneous use by multiple people. Thanks to its use of Windows 8, the Horizon can also serve as a desktop computer when set upright.

==== Legion and LOQ ====
Legion is a series of laptops and tablets from Lenovo targeting gaming performance. The first Legion brand laptops was revealed at CES 2017, the Legion Y520 and the Legion Y720. On 6 June 2017, a high-performance model, the Legion Y920, equipped with Intel's seventh-generation quad-core i7-7820HK and Nvidia GTX 1070 discrete graphics, was launched.

At E3 2018, Lenovo announced three new laptops with new redesigned chassis, Y530, Y730 and Y7000.

In 2020, Lenovo launched Legion 3, 5, and 7, where Legion 7 is the highest specification of the series.

In 2021, Lenovo launched Legion 5 pro with AMD 5th series CPU and Nvidia 30s GPU.

In March 2023, Lenovo launched the LOQ gaming sub-brand which is aimed towards budget and new-to-gaming markets.

=== Smartphones ===
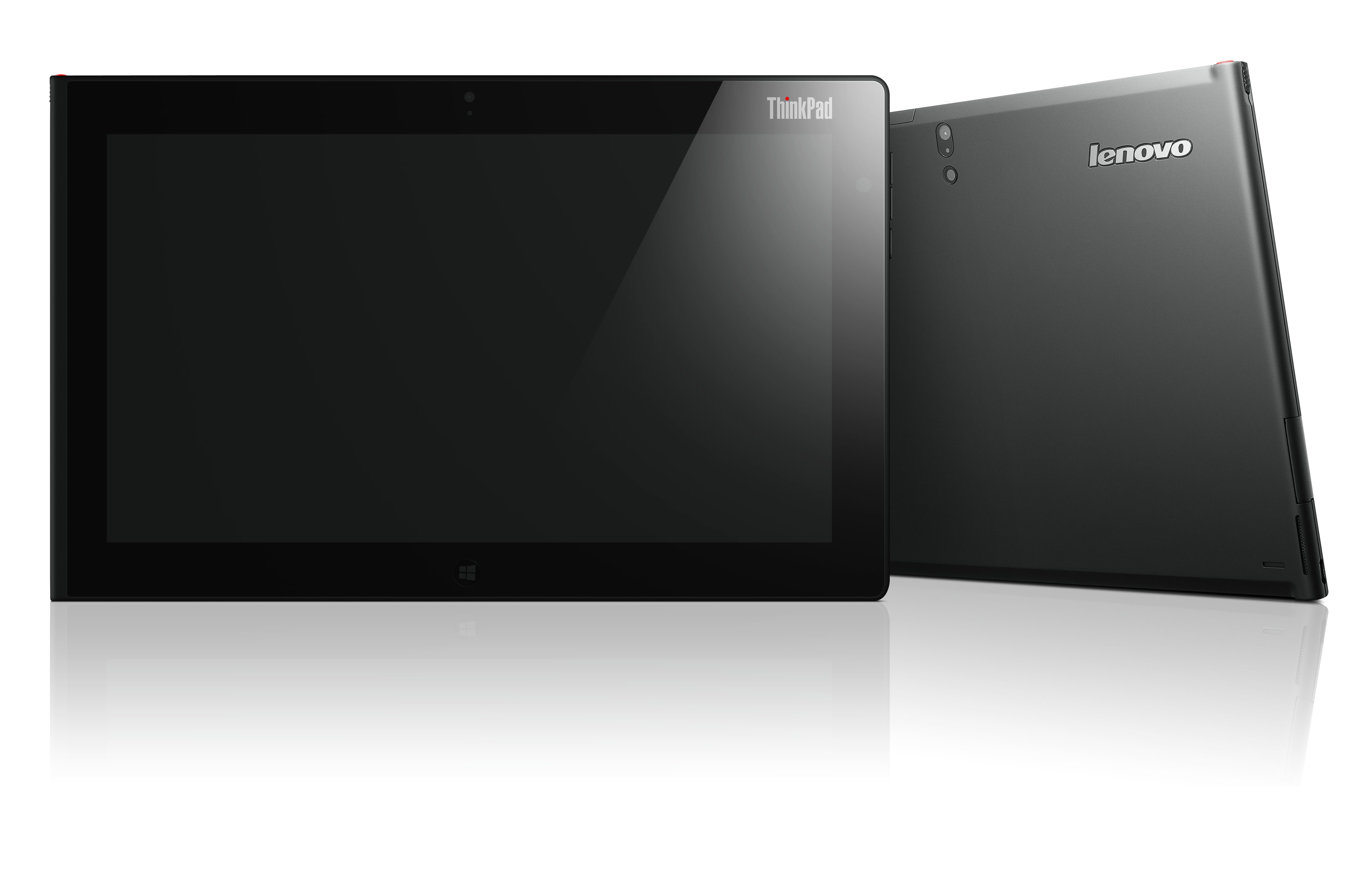
The Lenovo ThinkPad Tablet 2 from front and back

As of January 2013, Lenovo only manufactured phones that use the Android operating system from Google. Numerous press reports indicated that Lenovo planned to release a phone running Windows Phone 8, According to J. D. Howard, a vice president at Lenovo's mobile division, the company would release a Windows Phone product if there is market demand.

Lenovo has implemented an aggressive strategy to replace Samsung Electronics as Mainland China market's top smartphone vendor. It has spent $793.5 million in Wuhan in order to build a plant that can produce 30 to 40 million phones per year. Data from Analysys International shows that Lenovo experienced considerable growth in smartphone sales in China during 2012. Specifically, it saw its market share increase to 14.2% during 2012's third quarter, representing an increase when compared to 4.8% in the same quarter of 2011. IDC analysts said that Lenovo's success is due to its "aggressive ramping-up and improvements in channel partnerships". Analysys International analyst Wang Ying wrote, "Lenovo possesses an obvious advantage over rivals in terms of sales channels." The company's CEO, Yang Yuanqing, said, "Lenovo does not want to be the second player ... we want to be the best. Lenovo has the confidence to outperform Samsung and Apple, at least in the Chinese market."

According to IHS iSuppli, Lenovo was a top-three smartphone maker in China with a 16.5% market share in the first quarter of 2012. According to a May report released by IDC Lenovo ranks fourth in the global tablet market by volume. As of November 2012, Lenovo was the second largest seller of mobile phones in China when measured by volume.

In May 2013, Lenovo CEO Yang Yuanqing indicated that the company had aimed to release smartphones in the United States within the next year. Later in October, Lenovo expressed interest in acquiring the Canadian smartphone maker BlackBerry Limited. However, its attempt was reportedly blocked by the Government of Canada, citing security concerns due to the use of BlackBerry devices by prominent members of the government. An official stated that "we have been pretty consistent that the message is Canada is open to foreign investment and investment from China in particular but not at the cost of compromising national security".

In January 2014, Lenovo announced a proposed deal to acquire Motorola Mobility to bolster its plans for the U.S. market. Microsoft officially announced that Lenovo had become the hardware partner of Windows Phone platform at the Mobile World Congress 2014. In January 2016, Lenovo announced at CES that the company would be producing the first Tango phone.

Lenovo plus Motorola was the 3rd largest producer of smartphones by volume in the world between 2011 and 2014. Since Lenovo's acquisition of Motorola Mobility, the combined global market share of Lenovo plus Motorola has fallen from 7.2% in 2014 to 3.9% in the third quarter of 2016. A number of factors have been cited as the cause of this reduced demand, including the fact that Lenovo relied heavily on carriers to sell its phones, its phones lacked strong branding and unique features to distinguish them in the competitive Chinese market where a weak economy and saturated market is slowing demand and the culture clash between a more hierarchical PC company and the need to be nimble to sell rapidly-evolving smartphones. In response to the weak sales, Lenovo announced in August 2015 that it would lay off 3,200 employees, mostly in its Motorola smartphone business.

In the reorganization which followed, Lenovo was uncertain how to brand its Motorola smartphones. In November 2015, members of Lenovo management made statements that Lenovo would use the Motorola brand for all its smartphones. Then, in January 2016, Lenovo announced that it would be eliminating the Motorola brand in favor of "Moto by Lenovo". The company reversed course in March 2017 and announced that the Motorola brand name would be used in all regions in future products. "In 2016, we just finished transforming ourselves," Motorola Chairman and President Aymar de Lencquesaing said in an interview, "We have clarity on how we present ourselves."

=== Smart televisions ===
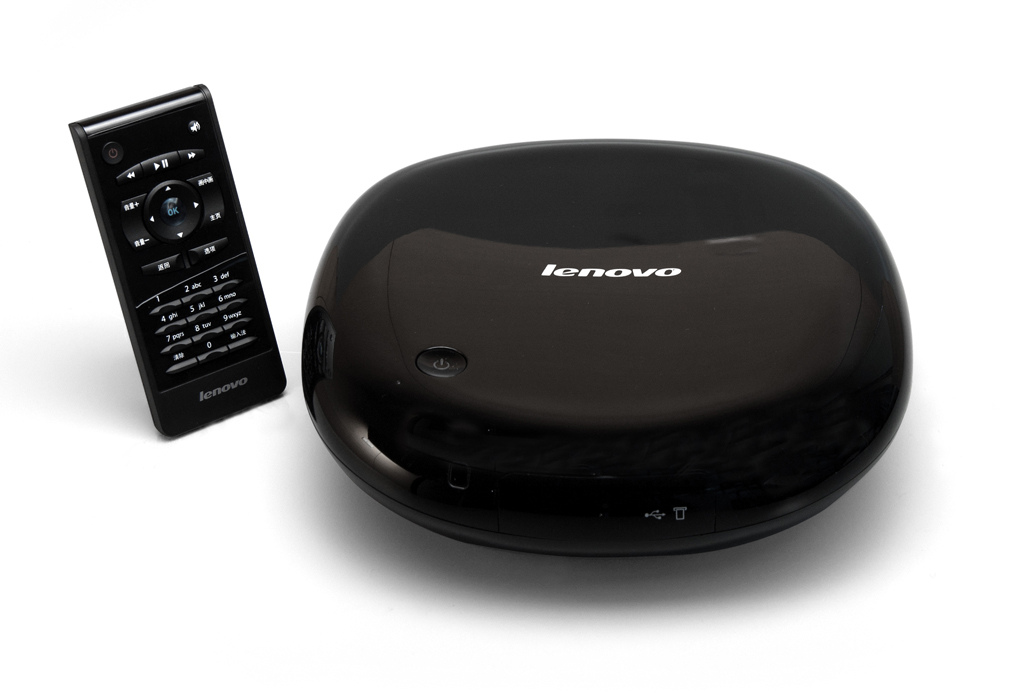
A Lenovo A30 TV set-top box

In November 2011, Lenovo said it would soon unveil a Smart TV product called LeTV, expected for release in the first quarter of 2012. "The PC, communications and TV industries are currently undergoing a "smart" transformation. In the future, users will have many smart devices and will desire an integrated experience of hardware, software and cloud services." Liu Jun, president of Lenovo's mobile-Internet and digital-home-business division. In June 2013 Lenovo announced a partnership with Sharp to produce smart televisions. In March 2014, Lenovo announced that it projected smart television sales surpassing one million units for 2014. The same month Lenovo released its flagship S9 Smart TV.

=== Wearables ===
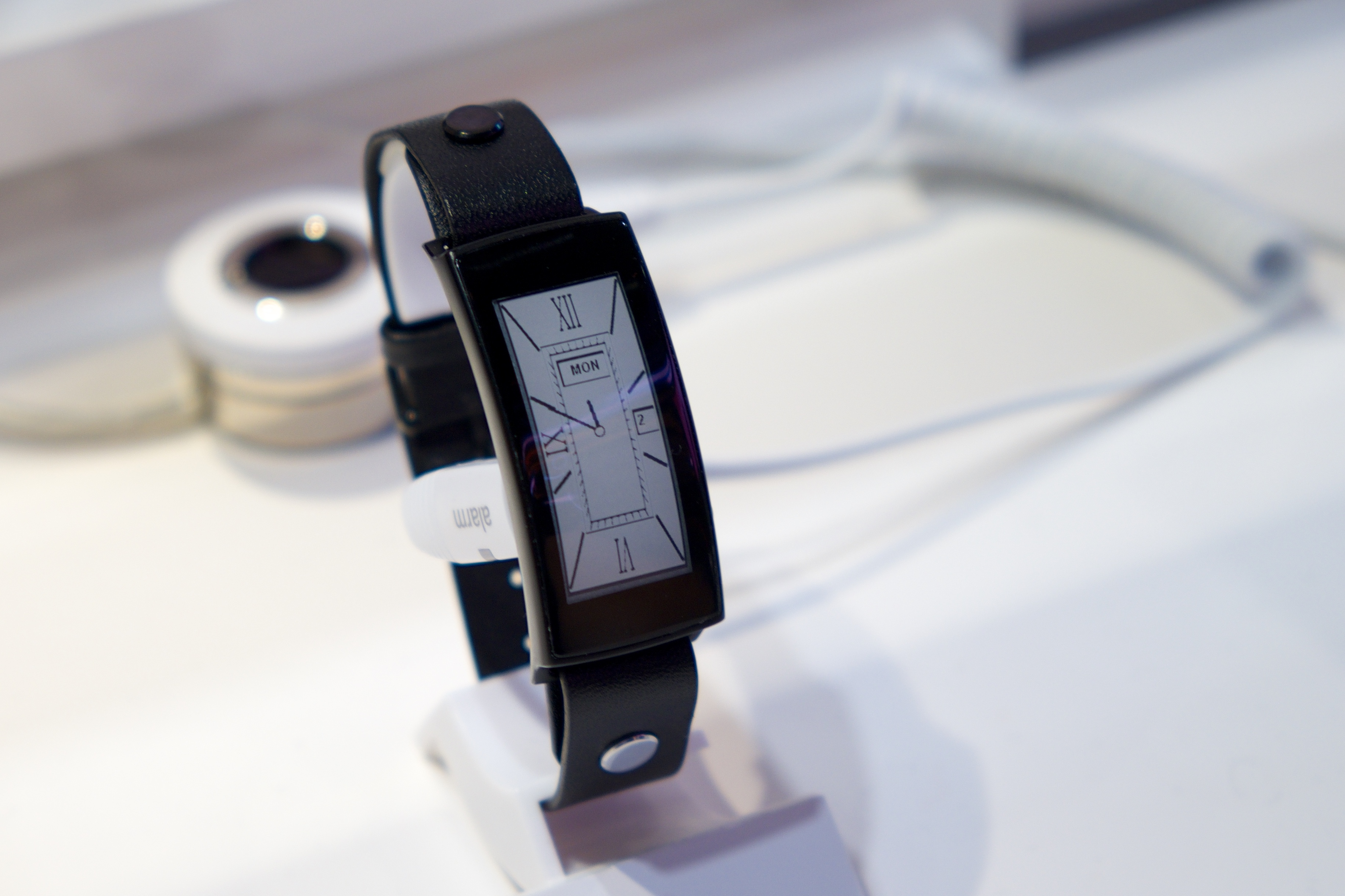
The Lenovo Smartwatch on display at the 2015 Mobile World Congress

Rumors that Lenovo was developing a wearable device were confirmed in October 2014 after the company submitted a regulatory finding to the Federal Communications Commission. The device, branded a "Smartband", has a battery life of seven days. It has an optical heart-rate monitor and can be used to track distance and time spent running and calories burned. It can also notify the user of incoming calls and texts. It can also unlock computers without the use of a password. The Smartband went on sale in October 2014. Lenovo started offering the device for sale on its website without a formal product announcement.

=== IoT / Smart Home ===
In 2015 Lenovo launched a strategic cooperation with IngDan (硬蛋), a subsidiary of Chinese electronics e-commerce company Cogobuy Group, to penetrate into the intelligent hardware sector. Lenovo wanted to procure High-Tech hardware in the then newly emerging Internet of Things (IoT) economy and formed a strategic partnership with Cogobuy in which it previously primarily bought IC components from. Cogobuy's supply chain was utilized by Lenovo to procure consumer devices and bridge gaps in its proprietary hardware and software development. At the IFA 2018, Lenovo launched several Home automation products.

=== Lenovo Connect ===
At the Mobile World Congress in 2016, Lenovo introduced Lenovo Connect, a wireless roaming service. This service works across devices, networks, and borders for customers in China and EMEA (Europe, the Middle East and Africa). Lenovo Connect eliminates the need to buy new SIM cards when crossing borders. Lenovo Connect started service for phones and select ThinkPad laptops in China in February 2016.

== Operations ==
Lenovo has operations in over 60 countries, and sells its products in around 180 countries. Lenovo's principal facilities are in Beijing, Singapore, and Morrisville, North Carolina, United States, with research centers in Beijing, Singapore, Morrisville, Shanghai, Shenzhen, Xiamen, Chengdu, Nanjing, Wuhan and Yamato (Kanagawa Prefecture, Japan). Lenovo operates manufacturing facilities in Chengdu and Hefei in China, and in Japan. A 700-square-metre (7,500 ft^{2}) global flagship opened in Beijing in February 2013.

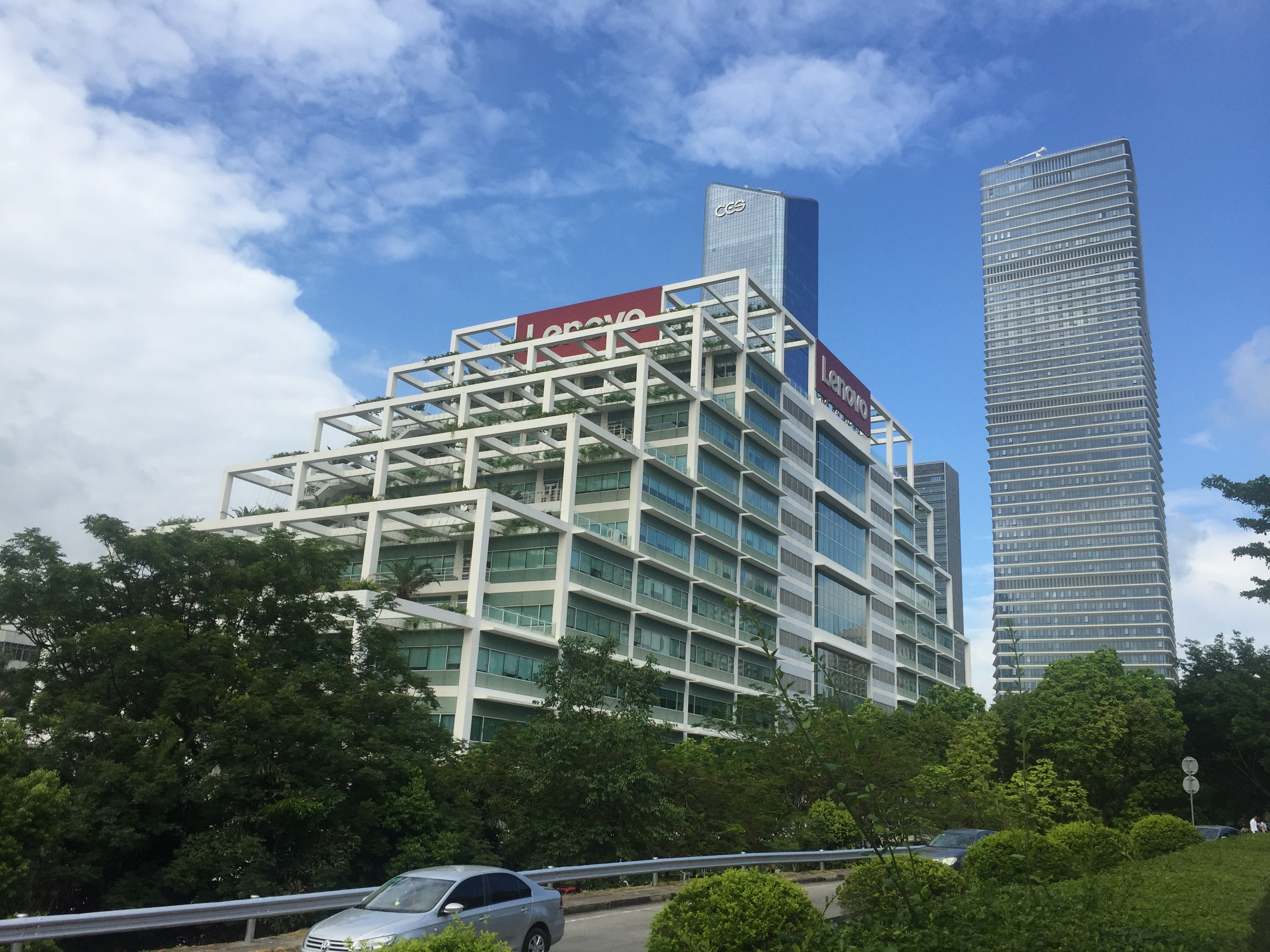
The Lenovo R&D center in Shenzhen, Guangdong

Lenovo's manufacturing operations are a departure from the usual industry practice of outsourcing to contract manufacturers. Lenovo instead focuses on vertical integration in order to avoid excessive reliance on original equipment manufacturers and to keep down costs. Speaking on this topic, Yang Yuanqing said, "Selling PCs is like selling fresh fruit. The speed of innovation is very fast, so you must know how to keep up with the pace, control inventory, to match supply with demand and handle very fast turnover." Lenovo benefited from its vertical integration after flooding affected hard-drive manufacturers in Thailand in 2011, as the company could continue manufacturing operations by shifting production towards products for which hard drives were still available.

Lenovo began to emphasize vertical integration after a meeting in 2009 in which CEO Yang Yuanqing, and the head of Lenovo's supply chain, analyzed the costs versus the benefits of in-house manufacturing, and decided to make at least 50% of Lenovo's manufacturing in-house. Lenovo Chief Technology Officer George He said that vertical integration is having an important role in product development. He stated, "If you look at the industry trends, most innovations for" PCs, smartphones, tablets and smart TVs are related to innovation of key components—display, battery and storage. Differentiation of key parts is so important. So we started investing more ... and working very closely with key parts suppliers." Previously, lack of integration due to numerous foreign acquisitions and an excessive number of "key performance indicators" (KPIs) was making Lenovo's expansion expensive and creating unacceptably slow delivery times to end-customers. Lenovo responded by reducing the number of KPIs from 150 to 5, offering intensive training to managers, and working to create a global Lenovo culture. Lenovo also doubled-down on vertical integration and manufacturing near target markets in order to cut costs at time when its competitors were making increased use of outsourcing offshoring. By 2013, Lenovo ranked 20th on Gartner's list of top 50 supply chains, whereas in 2010 the company was unranked.

In 2012, Lenovo partially moved production of its ThinkPad line of computers to Japan. ThinkPads will be produced by NEC in Yamagata Prefecture. Akemi Watanabe (渡辺朱美, Watanabe Akemi), president of Lenovo Japan, said, "As a Japanese, I am glad to see the return to domestic production and the goal is to realize full-scale production as this will improve our image and make the products more acceptable to Japanese customers."

In October 2012, Lenovo announced that it would start assembling computers in Whitsett, North Carolina. Production of desktop and laptop computers, including the ThinkPad Helix began in January 2013. As of July 2013, 115 workers were employed at this facility. Lenovo has been in Whitsett since 2008, where it also has centers for logistics, customer service, and return processing.

In 2015, Lenovo and Hong Kong Cyberport Management Company Limited, a government-sponsored business park for technology firms, reached a deal to "jointly build a cloud service and product research and development center". Lenovo's Asia Pacific data center will also be housed in Cyperport.

Lenovo assembles smartphones in Chennai, India through a contract manufacturing agreement with Flex. In November 2015, Lenovo announced that it would start manufacturing computers in Pondicherry.

=== Accusations of slave labor by supplier ===
In August 2020, The Intercept reported that Lenovo imported about 258,000 laptops from the Chinese manufacturer Hefei Bitland Information Technology, a company, among others, accused by the Australian Strategic Policy Institute of using Uyghur forced labor. In July 2020, the United States Commerce Department added 11 companies, including Hefei Bitland, implicated in human rights abuses on the Entity List. Lenovo took some shipments out of the distribution, but other shipments were distributed to consumers.

In late July, Lenovo informed its customers it had stopped manufacturing with Bitland and was moving production of related devices to other suppliers.

== Corporate affairs ==
=== Business trends ===
The key trends for Lenovo are (as of the financial year ending 31 March):

	Revenue (US$ bn)	Net profit (US$ bn)	Total assets (US$ bn)	Employees
2013	33.8	0.63	16.8	35,000
2014	38.7	0.81	18.3	54,000
2015	46.2	0.82	27.0	60,000
2016	44.9	−0.12	24.9	60,000
2017	43.0	0.53	27.1	52,000
2018	45.3	−0.18	28.4	54,000
2019	51.0	0.59	29.9	57,000
2020	50.7	0.66	32.1	57,000
2021	60.7	1.1	37.9	71,500
2022	71.6	2.0	44.5	75,000
2023	61.9	1.6	38.9	77,000
2024	56.8	1.1	38.7	69,500

=== Headquarters ===
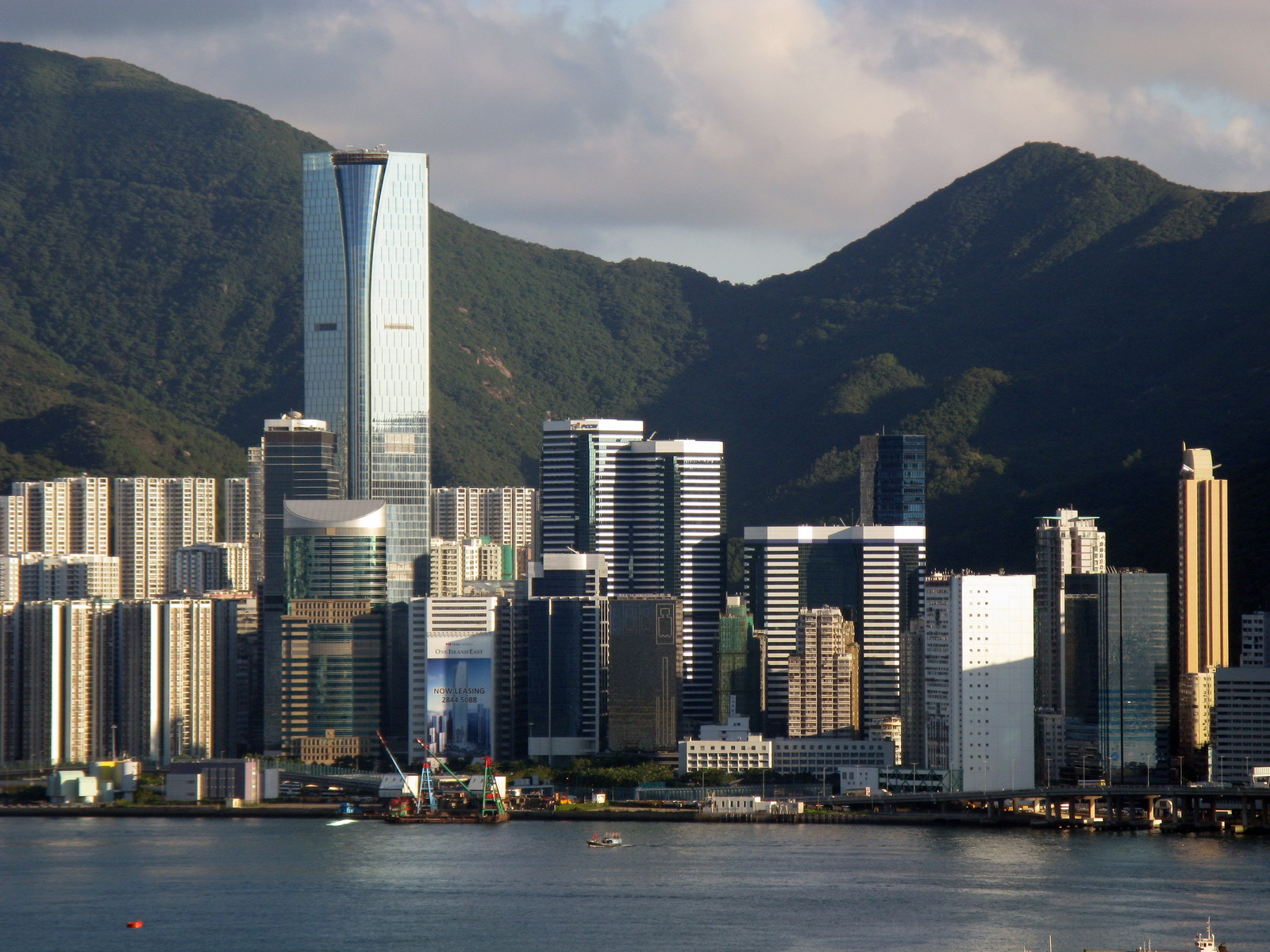
Lenovo's registered office is in Taikoo Place, Hong Kong.

Alongside Beijing, the company has operational centers in Lorong Chuan, Singapore, and Morrisville, North Carolina (near Raleigh in the Research Triangle metropolitan area) in the United States. As of October 2012, the Morrisville facility has about 2,000 employees. Lenovo identifies its facilities in Beijing, Singapore, and Morrisville as its "key location addresses", where its principal operations occur. The company's registered office is on the 23rd floor of the Lincoln House building of the Taikoo Place in Quarry Bay, Hong Kong.

Previously the company's U.S. headquarters were in Purchase, Harrison, New York. About 70 people worked there. In 2006, Lenovo announced that it was consolidating its U.S. headquarters, a logistics facility in Boulder, Colorado, and a call center in Atlanta, to a new facility in Morrisville. The company received offers of over $11 million in incentive funds from the local Morrisville, North Carolina, area and from the State of North Carolina on the condition that the company employs about 2,200 people. In early 2016, Lenovo carried out a comprehensive restructuring of its business units.

=== Financials and market share ===
In the third quarter of 2020, Lenovo commands a leading market share of 25.7 percent of all PCs sold in the world.

In March 2013, Lenovo was included as a constituent stock in the Hang Seng Index. Lenovo replaced the unprofitable Aluminum Corporation of China Limited, a state-owned enterprise, on the list of 50 key companies on the Hong Kong stock exchange that constitute the Hang Seng Index. The inclusion of Lenovo and Tencent, China's largest internet firm, significantly increased the weight of the technology sector on the index. Being added to the Hang Seng Index was a significant boon for Lenovo and its shareholders as it widened the pool of investors willing to purchase Lenovo's stock. For instance, index funds pegged to the Hang Seng and pension funds that consider index inclusion now have the opportunity to invest in Lenovo. In November 2013 Lenovo reported that it had achieved double-digit market share in the United States for the first time.

=== Ownership ===
In 2009, China Oceanwide Holdings Group, a private Investment company based in Beijing, bought 29% of Legend Holdings, the parent company of Lenovo, for ¥2.76 billion. As of 31 March 2018, 65% of Lenovo stock was held by the general public, 29% by Legend Holdings, 5.8% by Yang Yuanqing, and 0.2% by other directors.

Responding to claims that Lenovo is a state-owned enterprise, CEO Yang Yuanqing said, "Our company is a 100% market oriented company. Some people have said we are a state-owned enterprise. It's 100% not true. In 1984 the Chinese Academy of Sciences only invested $25,000 in our company. The purpose of the Chinese Academy of Sciences to invest in this company was that it wanted to commercialize its research results. The Chinese Academy of Sciences is a pure research entity in China, owned by the government. From this point, you could say we're different from state-owned enterprises. Secondly, after this investment, this company is run totally by the founders and management team. The government has never been involved in our daily operation, in important decisions, strategic direction, nomination of the CEO and top executives and financial management. Everything is done by our management team."

As of 2014, the Chinese Academy of Sciences, owns 11.7% of Lenovo and IBM owns 37.8%.

In early 2006, the U.S. State Department was harshly criticized for purchasing 16,000 computers from Lenovo. Critics argued that Lenovo was controlled by the Chinese government and a potential vehicle for espionage against the United States. Yang spoke out forcefully and publicly to defend Lenovo. He said, "We are not a government-controlled company." He pointed out that Lenovo pioneered China's transition to a market economy and that in the early 1990s had fought and beaten four state-owned enterprises that dominated the Chinese computer market. Those firms had the full backing of the state while Lenovo received no special treatment. The State Department deal went through. Yang worried that fears about Lenovo's supposed connections to the Chinese government would be an ongoing issue in the United States. Yang worked to ease worries by communicating directly with Congress.

Yang dramatically increased his ownership stake by acquiring 797 million shares in 2011. As of June 2011, Yang owned an 8 per cent stake in Lenovo. He previously owned only 70 million shares. In a statement, Yang said, "While the transaction is a personal financial matter, I want to be very clear that my decision to make this investment is based on my strong belief in the company's very bright future. Our culture is built on commitment and ownership – we do what we say, and we own what we do. My decision to increase my holdings represents my steadfast belief in these principles."

=== Corporate culture ===
Lenovo's senior executives rotate between the three head offices at Beijing, Singapore, and Morrisville, as well as Lenovo's research and development center in Yamato, Japan.

=== Leadership ===
==== Yang Yuanqing ====
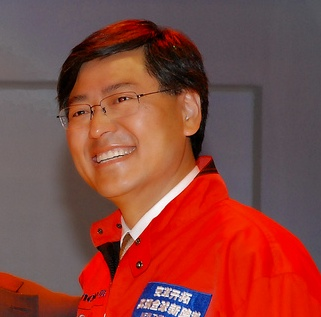
Yang Yuanqing, Lenovo's Chairman and CEO

Yang Yuanqing is the chairman and chief executive officer of Lenovo. One of his major achievements was leading Lenovo to become the best-selling personal computer brand in China since 1997. In 2001, Bloomberg Businessweek named him one of Asia's rising stars in business. Yang was president and CEO of Lenovo until 2004, when Lenovo closed its acquisition of IBM's PC division, after which Yang was succeeded as Lenovo CEO by IBM's Stephen M. Ward Jr. Ward was succeeded by William Amelio on 20 December 2005. In February 2009, Yang replaced Amelio as CEO and has served in that capacity ever since. Yang was chairman of Lenovo's board from 2004 to 2008, and returned as chairman in 2012 alongside his role as CEO.

In 2012, Yang received a $3 million bonus as a reward for record profits, which he in turn redistributed to about 10,000 of Lenovo's employees. According to Lenovo spokesman, Jeffrey Shafer, Yang felt that it would be the right thing to, "redirect [the money] to the employees as a real tangible gesture for what they done." Shafer also said that Yang, who owns about eight per cent of Lenovo's stock, "felt that he was rewarded well simply as the owner of the company". The bonuses were mostly distributed among staff working in positions such as production and reception who received an average of CN¥2,000 or about US$314. This was almost equivalent to a monthly salary of an average worker in China. Yang made a similar gift of US$3.25 million again in 2013.

According to Lenovo's annual report, Yang earned US$14 million, including US$5.2 million in bonuses, during the fiscal year that ended in March 2012.

In 2013, Barron's named Yang one of the "World's Best CEOs".

==== Liu Chuanzhi ====
Liu Chuanzhi is the founder and former chairman of Lenovo. Liu was trained as an engineer at a military college and later went on to work at the Chinese Academy of Sciences. Like many young people during the Cultural Revolution, Liu was denounced and sent to the countryside where he worked as a laborer on a rice farm. Liu claims Hewlett-Packard as a key source of inspiration. In an interview with The Economist he stated that "Our earliest and best teacher was Hewlett-Packard." For more than ten years, Lenovo was Hewlett-Packard's distributor in China. In reference to Lenovo's later acquisition of IBM's personal computer unit Liu said, "I remember the first time I took part in a meeting of IBM agents. I was wearing an old business suit of my father's and I sat in the back row. Even in my dreams, I never imagined that one day we could buy the IBM PC business. It was unthinkable. Impossible."

==== Board of directors ====
In early 2013, Lenovo announced the addition of Yahoo! founder Jerry Yang to its board. Lenovo's CEO Yang Yuanqing said, "Jerry's appointment as an observer to our board furthers Lenovo's reputation as a transparent international company." Just prior to the appointment of Jerry Yang, Tudor Brown, the founder of British semiconductor design firm ARM, was also appointed to Lenovo's board. Speaking of both men Yang Yuanqing said, "We believe that they will add a great deal to our strategic thinking, long-term direction and, ultimately, our ability to achieve our aspirations in the PC plus era."

== Marketing and sponsorships ==
In 2009, Lenovo became the first personal computer manufacturer to divide countries into emerging markets and mature markets. Lenovo then developed a different set of strategies for each category. Lenovo's competitors have widely adopted the same approach. In 2012, Lenovo made a major effort to expand its market share in developing economies such as Brazil and India through acquisitions and increased budgets for marketing and advertising.

=== Celebrity sponsorships and endorsements ===
In October 2013, Lenovo announced that it had hired American actor Ashton Kutcher as a product engineer and spokesman. David Roman, Lenovo's chief marketing officer, said, "His partnership goes beyond traditional bounds by deeply integrating him into our organization as a product engineer. Ashton will help us break new ground by challenging assumptions, bringing a new perspective and contributing his technical expertise to Yoga Tablet and other devices." Kobe Bryant became an official ambassador for Lenovo smartphones in China and Southeast Asia in early 2013. Bryant appeared in a social campaign titled "The Everyday Kobe Challenge" for the launch of Lenovo IdeaPhone K900 in Malaysia, Thailand, Indonesia and the Philippines in the same year.

=== Sporting sponsorship ===
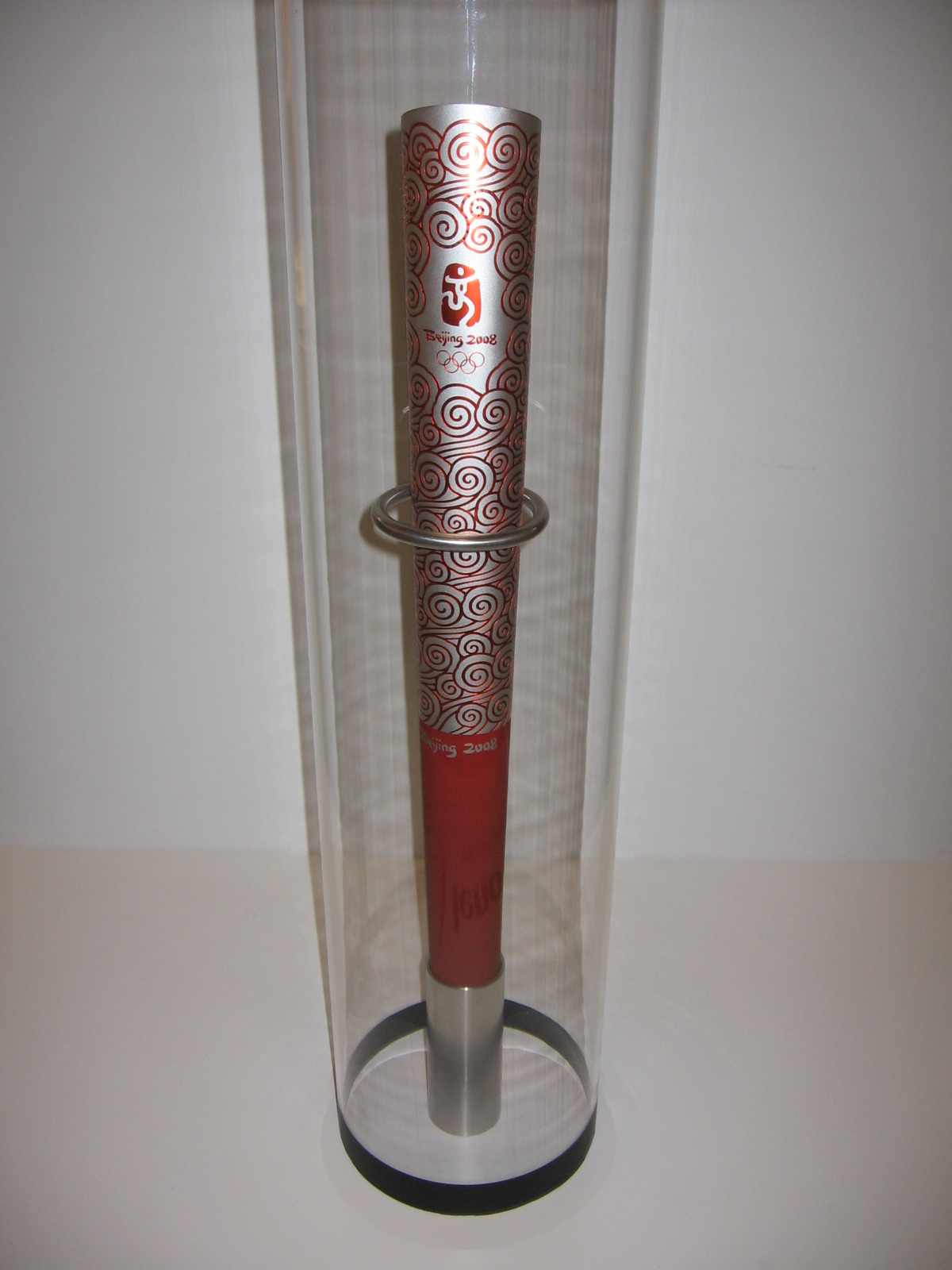
The 2008 Summer Olympics Torch was designed by Lenovo.

Lenovo was an official computer sponsor of the 2006 Winter Olympics in Turin, Italy, and the 2008 Summer Olympics in Beijing. When asked about Lenovo's brand Yang Yuanqing said, "The Beijing Olympics were very good for brand awareness in countries like the US and Argentina, but not good enough." The NFL has been a Lenovo customer since 2007. In July 2012, Lenovo and the National Football League (NFL) announced that Lenovo had become the NFL's "Official Laptop, Desktop and Workstation Sponsor." Lenovo said that this was its largest sponsorship deal ever in the United States. NFL stars Jerry Rice, DeAngelo Williams, and Torry Holt were on hand for the announcement and a celebration with 1,500 Lenovo employees. Lenovo's sponsorship will last at least three years.

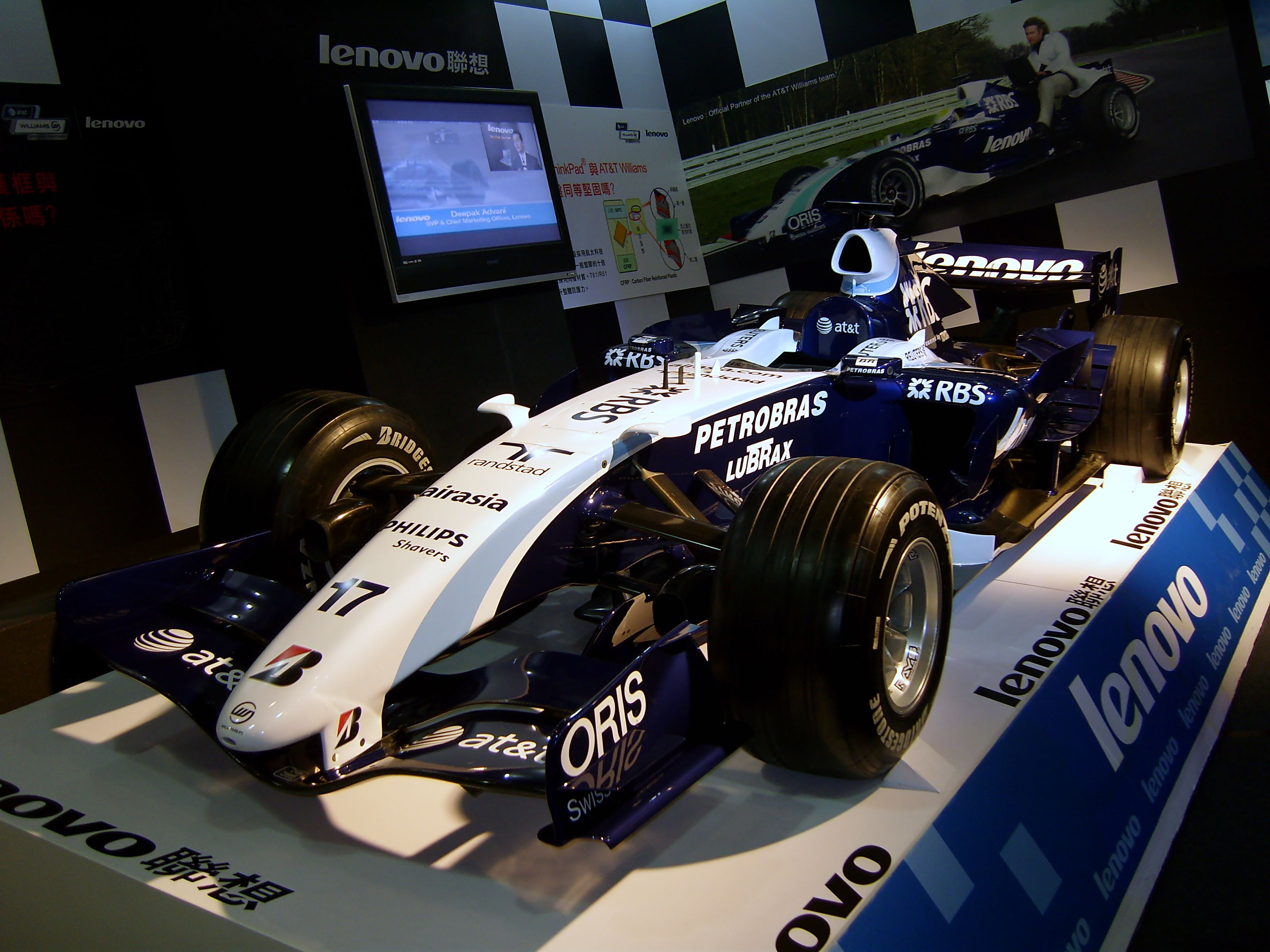
2007 AT&T Williams Lenovo F1 car

In Formula One, Lenovo is a global partner of F1, serving as an official technology provider that powers both the physical race operations and the virtual broadcasts. The multi-year deal includes trackside branding, title sponsorships for selected races, and integration of its subsidiaries like Motorola. Previously, Lenovo also collaborated with the AT&T Williams team in 2007 as a sponsor and Scuderia Ferrari team from 2018 through the 2019 season.

Lenovo is a technology partner of Ducati Corse in Grand Prix motorcycle racing since 2018. For the 2021 MotoGP it will become main sponsor for the Bolognese.

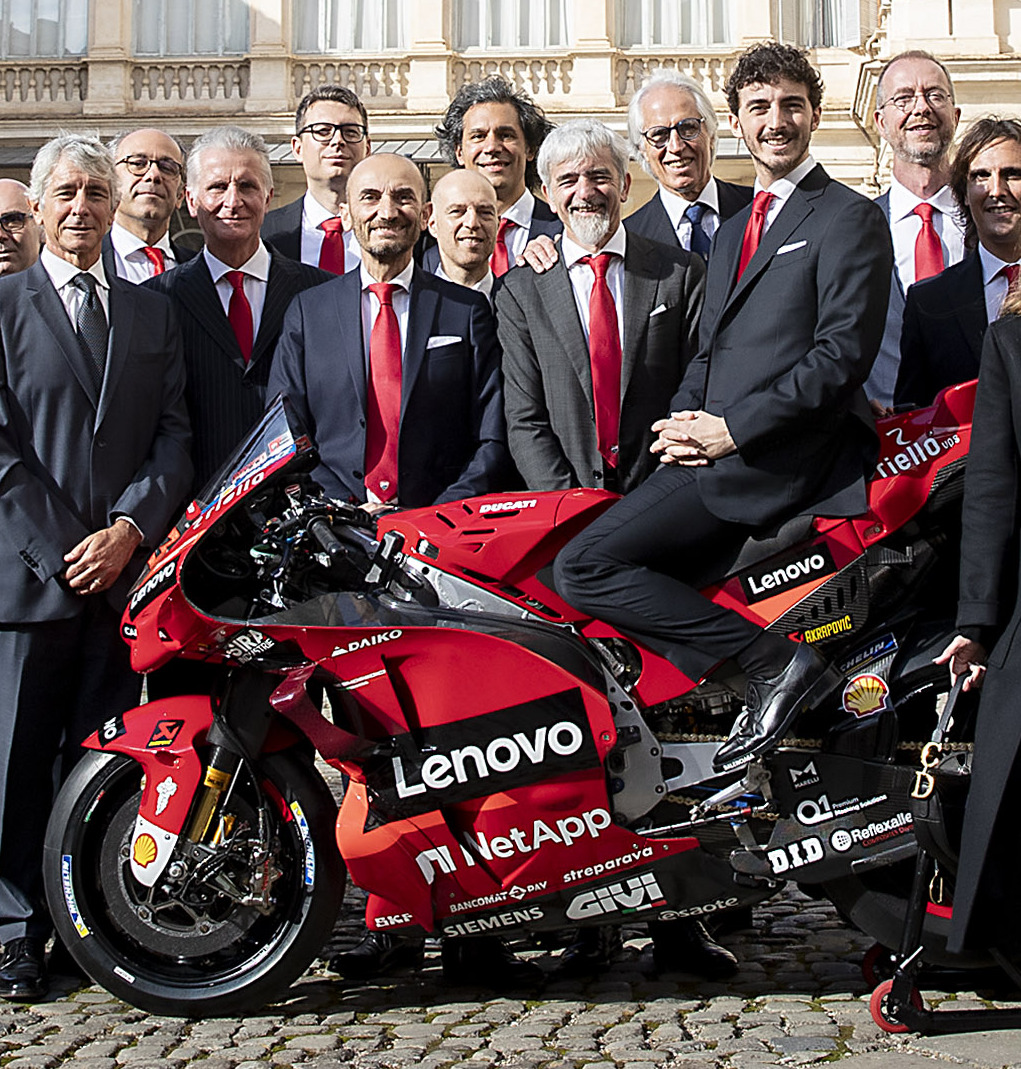
Lenovo as Ducati MotoGP Team title sponsor in the 2022 season

Lenovo is also an official partner of the NHL's Carolina Hurricanes who play in nearby Raleigh, North Carolina. In 2024, Lenovo bought the naming rights to their arena, renaming it Lenovo Center.

Lenovo and FC Internazionale, in 2019, have signed a multi-year sponsorship agreement that makes Lenovo the Global Technology Partner of the Nerazzurri company. In May 2021, Lenovo and Motorola Mobility decided to celebrate with a limited edition of Motorola Razr totally customized and produced in 2021 numbered pieces, to honor Inter who won their 19th Scudetto. In July 2021 there was the launch of the new Inter Home shirt for the 2021–22 season, they unveiled the introduction of Lenovo as a sponsor on the back of the shirt. In October 2024, Lenovo was named the official technology partner of FIFA.

=== Television, internet, and other media ===
Lenovo used a short-film entitled The Pursuit in its "For Those Who Do" campaign launched in 2011. The film depicted a mysterious young woman using the IdeaPad Yoga 13 to stay one-step-ahead of her evil pursuers. Martin Campbell, who previously worked on action movies and James Bond films such as GoldenEye and the remake of Casino Royale, shot this film. Lenovo was the first Chinese company to make use of such marketing techniques.

In May 2015, Lenovo hosted its first ever "Tech World" conference in Beijing. ZUK Mobile, a separate company formed by Lenovo in 2014, announced several products at Tech World. These included slim power banks, 3D printers that can print food such as chocolate, an outdoor sound box, and a Wi-Fi based control system for home automation.

=== China ===
In its home market China, Lenovo has a vast distribution network designed to make sure that there is at least one shop selling Lenovo computers within 50 kilometers of nearly all consumers. Lenovo has also developed close relationships with its Chinese distributors, who are granted exclusive territories and only carry Lenovo products.

As of July 2013, Lenovo believes that urbanization initiatives being pushed by former premier Li Keqiang will allow it to sustain sales growth in China for the foreseeable future. Speaking at Lenovo's annual general meeting in Hong Kong in 2013, Yang Yuanqing said: "I believe urbanisation will help us further increase the overall [domestic] PC market." Yang also stressed the opportunity presented by China's relatively low penetration rate of personal computers. Lenovo previously benefited from the Chinese government's rural subsidies, part of a wider economic stimulus initiative, designed to increase purchases of appliances and electronics. That program, which Lenovo joined in 2004, ended in 2011. Lenovo enjoys consistent price premiums over its traditional competitors in rural markets and a stronger local sales and service presence.

=== India ===
Lenovo has gained significant market share in India through bulk orders to large companies and government agencies. For example, the government of Tamil Nadu ordered a million ThinkPads from IBM/Lenovo in 2012 and single-handedly made the firm a market leader. Lenovo distributes most of the personal computers it sells in India through five national distributors such as Ingram Micro and Redington.

Given that most smartphones and tablets are sold to individuals Lenovo is pursuing a different strategy making use of many small state-centric distributors. Amar Babu, Lenovo's managing director for India, said, "To reach out to small towns and the hinterland, we have tied up with 40 regional distributors. We want our distributors to be exclusive to us. We will, in turn, ensure they have exclusive rights to distribute Lenovo products in their catchment area." As of 2013, Lenovo had about 6,000 retailers selling smartphones and tablets in India. In February 2013, Lenovo established a relationship with Reliance Communications to sell smartphones. The smartphones carried by Reliance have dual-SIM capability and support both GSM and CDMA. Babu claims that the relative under penetration of smartphones in India represents an opportunity for Lenovo.

Lenovo has assembled a team of senior managers familiar with the Indian market, launched mobile phones at all price points there, and worked on branding to build market share. As of February 2014, Lenovo claims that its sales of smartphones in India have been increasing 100% per quarter while the market is only growing 15–20% over the same period. Lenovo did marketing tests of its smartphones in November 2012 in Gujarat and some southern cities, where Lenovo already had a strong presence. Lenovo's strategy has been to create awareness, maintain a broad selection of phones at all price points, and develop distribution networks. Lenovo partnered with two national distributors and over 100 local distributors. As of February 2014, more than 7,000 retail outlets in India sold Lenovo smartphones. Lenovo has also partnered with HCL in order to set up 250 service centers in 110 cities.

In India, Lenovo grants distributors exclusive territories but allows them to sell computers from other companies. Lenovo uses its close relationships with distributors to gain market intelligence and speed up product development.

Lenovo reported a year-on-year increase of about 951% in tablet sales in India for the first quarter of 2014. Canalys, a market research firm, said Lenovo took market share away from Apple and Samsung in the country.

=== Africa ===
Lenovo first started doing business in South Africa, establishing a sales office, and then expanded to East African markets such as Kenya, Tanzania, Ethiopia, Uganda, and Rwanda. West Africa followed when Lenovo set-up a Nigerian legal office and then expanded to Ghana, Zimbabwe, Mozambique and Botswana.

According to Lenovo's general manager for Africa, Graham Braum, Lenovo's strategy is to put "great emphasis on products that sell well in Africa" and roll out "products alongside different African governments' rolling out of wireless technology". Products such as the Lenovo Yoga series are popular in Africa because of their long battery life, as many areas have unreliable electrical supply. Other popular products include the Lenovo netbooks, which were introduced in 2008.

Lenovo picked Nigeria in 2013 to release its smartphone because unlike South Africa and other African countries, there is no requirement to partner with a local telecom firm to sell its phones.

In the long term, according to Braum, "Lenovo in Africa will focus on continuing to consistently supply personal computer products and allow this market to grow, while moving into new territory such as mobile and enterprise."

=== Singapore ===
Lenovo has had a presence in Singapore as early as its foundation, and with a focus on the Southeast Asia region, it is the location of one of Lenovo's three head offices. Registered as Lenovo (Singapore) Pte. Ltd., it is located at the New Tech Park in the Lorong Chuan district of the North-East Region of Singapore.

=== United States ===
In the United States, Lenovo began the "For Those Who Do" marketing campaign in 2010, created by the ad agency Saatchi & Saatchi. It was part of Lenovo's first-ever global branding campaign, beyond its domestic market in China. "For Those Who Do" was designed to appeal to young consumers in the 18- to 25-year-old demographic by stressing its utility to creative individuals that Lenovo's advertising refers to as "doers". One of Lenovo's operational centers is located in North Carolina, United States. Lenovo also started manufacturing products in the United States in 2012.

=== Goodweird ===
Lenovo launched a multi-year advertising campaign called "Goodweird" in the last half of 2015. Goodweird is designed to convey the idea that designs that seem strange initially often become familiar and widely accepted. The Goodweird campaign includes a video with famous images of early attempts to fly with the aid of homemade wings and a bicycle that transitions to a modern-day shot of a man soaring across mountains in a wingsuit before transitioning again to a shot of the Stealth Bomber. Lenovo worked with three agencies on Goodweird: London-based DLKW Low, We Are Social, and Blast Radius. Goodweird is part of Lenovo's wider strategy to appeal to millennials with an emphasis on design trendsetters. A portion of the funding for Goodweird is being directed to prominent YouTubers and Viners. BuzzFeed has been engaged to create relevant content.

== Security and privacy incidents ==
=== Superfish ===
In February 2015, Lenovo became the subject of controversy for having bundled software identified as malware on some of its laptops. The software, Superfish Visual Discovery, is a web browser add-on that injects Pricing advertising into search engine results pages. To intercept HTTPS-encrypted communications, the software also installed a self-signed public key certificate. When the Superfish public-key cryptography was compromised, it was also discovered that the same private key was used across all installations of the software, leaving users vulnerable to security exploits utilizing the key. Lenovo made between US$200,000 to 250,000 on its deal with Superfish. In 2017 Lenovo agreed to pay US$3.5 million as part of a settlement with the US Federal Trade Commission. and announced an apology to its customers and stockholders.

The head of Superfish responded to security concerns by saying the vulnerability was "inadvertently" introduced by Komodia, which built the application. In response to the criticism, Lenovo detailed that it would cease further distribution and use of the Superfish software, and offered affected customers free six-month subscriptions to the McAfee LiveSafe software. Lenovo issued a promise to reduce the amount of "Software bloat" it bundles with its Windows 10 devices, promising to only include Lenovo software, security software, drivers, and "certain applications customarily expected by users". Salon tech writer David Auerbach compared the Superfish incident to the Sony DRM rootkit scandal, and argued that "installing Superfish is one of the most irresponsible mistakes an established tech company has ever made."

=== Lenovo Service Engine ===
From October 2014 through June 2015, the UEFI firmware on certain Lenovo models had contained software known as "Lenovo Service Engine", which Lenovo says automatically sent non-identifiable system information to Lenovo the first time Windows is connected to the internet, and on laptops, automatically installs the Lenovo OneKey Optimizer program (software considered to be Software bloat) as well. This process occurs even on clean installations of Windows. It was found that this program had been automatically installed using a new feature in Windows 8, Windows Platform Binary Table, which allows executable files to be stored within UEFI firmware for execution on startup, and is meant to "allow critical software to persist even when the operating system has changed or been reinstalled in a "clean" configuration"; specifically, anti-theft security software. The software was discontinued after it was found that aspects of the software had security vulnerabilities, and did not comply with revised guidelines for appropriate usage of WPBT. On 31 July 2015, Lenovo released instructions and UEFI firmware updates meant to remove Lenovo Service Engine.

=== Lenovo Customer Feedback program ===
At a third time in 2015, criticism arose that Lenovo might have installed software that looked suspicious on their commercial Think-PC lines. This was discovered by Computerworld writer Michael Horowitz, who had purchased several Think systems with the Customer Feedback program installed, which seemed to log usage data and metrics. Further analysis by Horowitz revealed however that this was mostly harmless, as it was only logging the usage of some pre-installed Lenovo programs, and not the usage in general, and only if the user allowed the data to be collected. Horowitz also criticized other media for quoting his original article and saying that Lenovo preinstalled spyware, as he himself never used that term in this case and he also said that he does not consider the software he found to be spyware.

=== Lenovo Accelerator ===
As of June 2016, a Duo Labs report stated that Lenovo was still installing bloatware, some of which leads to security vulnerabilities as soon as the user turns on their new PC. Lenovo advised users to remove the offending app, "Lenovo Accelerator". According to Lenovo, the app, designed to "speed up the loading" of Lenovo applications, created a man-in-the-middle security vulnerability.

=== U.S. Marine network security breach ===
In February 2021, Bloomberg Businessweek reported that U.S. investigators found in 2008 that military units in Iraq were using Lenovo laptops in which the hardware had been altered. According to a testimony from the case in 2010, "A large amount of Lenovo laptops were sold to the U.S. military that had a chip encrypted [sic] on the motherboard that would record all the data that was being inputted into that laptop and send it back to China". Moreover, according to the article, "Lenovo was unaware of the testimony and the U.S. military did not inform the company of any security concerns," and that a Lenovo spokesperson stated that they "...have no way to assess the allegations you cite or whether security concerns may have been triggered by third-party interference".

== See also ==
- List of computer system manufacturers
- List of companies of China
