= ThinkPad X100e =

Lenovo ThinkPad X100e
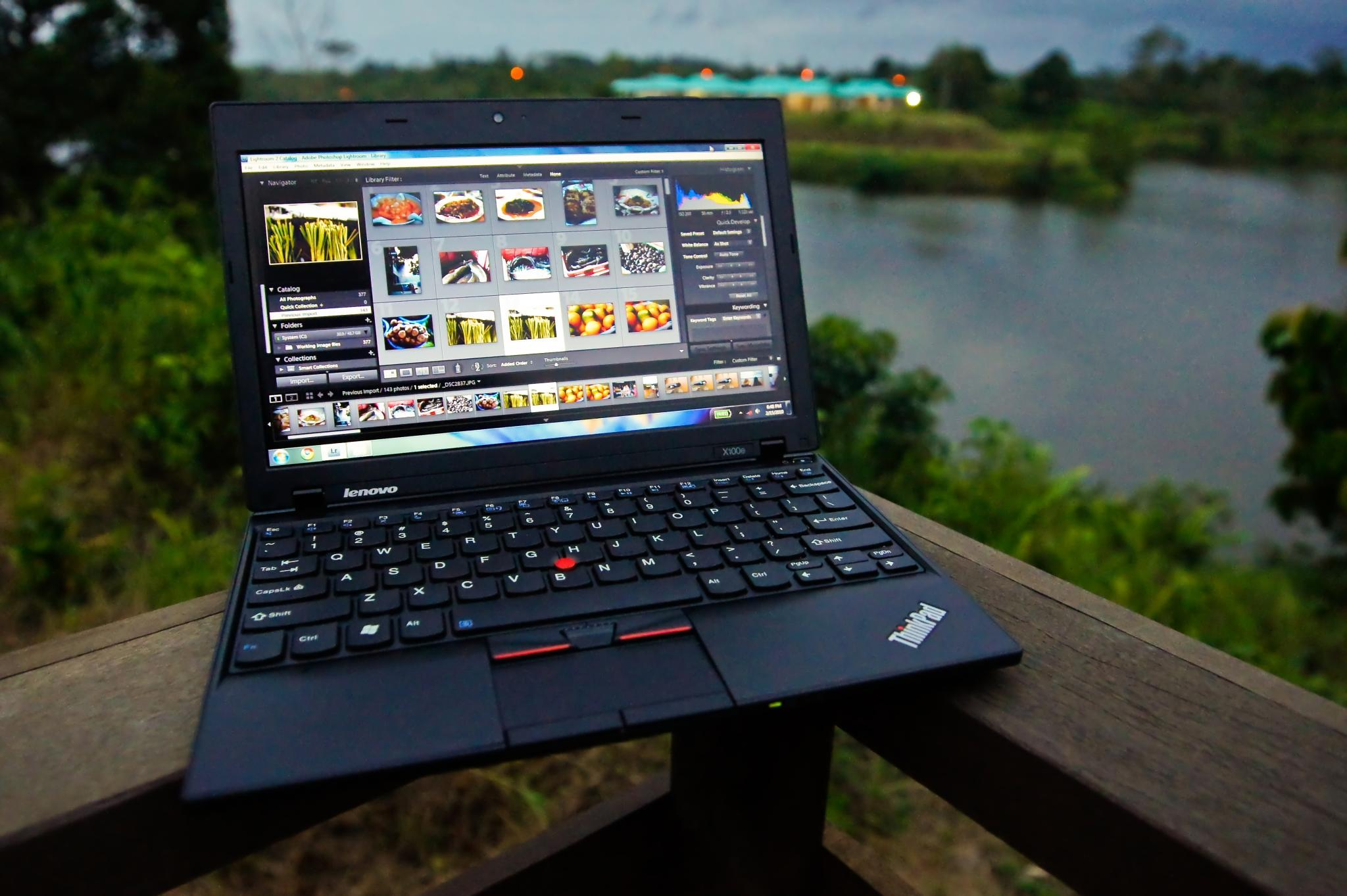
- Manufacturer: Lenovo
- Type: Laptop

The Lenovo ThinkPad X100e is a laptop from the ThinkPad line that was manufactured by Lenovo. It has an 11.6 inch screen and roughly a 16:9 aspect ratio. The ThinkPad comes with Windows 7 Professional and has a 5 1/2 hour battery life.
