= ThinkPad Helix =

2-in-1 convertible tablets

Lenovo ThinkPad Helix refers to two generations of 2-in-1 convertible tablets that can be used as both a conventional ultrabook and a tablet computer. The first-generation Helix was announced at the 2013 International CES and was released on 21 May 2013. A second-generation Helix came out in 2014.

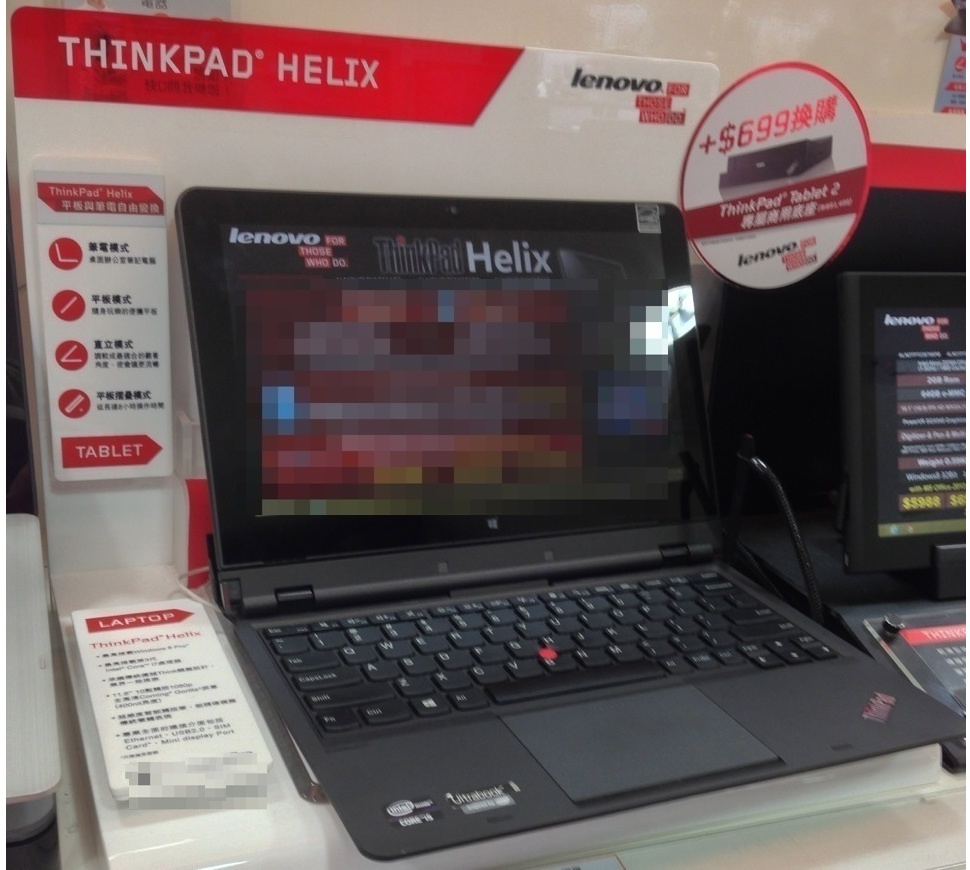
The ThinkPad Helix on display in Hong Kong

== History ==
=== First generation ===
In April of 2013, Lenovo released the Thinkpad Helix. The Helix was announced at the 2013 International CES. Lenovo advertised the device as a “high performance Ultrabook with a detachable Windows 8/10 tablet.” The starting price for the base model Helix was $1,499. Reviewers noted the device overheating, and it having a sturdy build

=== Second generation ===
The ThinkPad Helix II was released on 16 October 2014. It is an Ultrabook-class convertible laptop based on the Intel Core M processor. The Helix II uses a vapor chamber with no moving parts instead of fans for cooling, achieving a significant noise reduction. It is both thinner and lighter than its predecessor at .38 inches thick and weighing 1.8 pounds.

== Features ==
=== Design ===
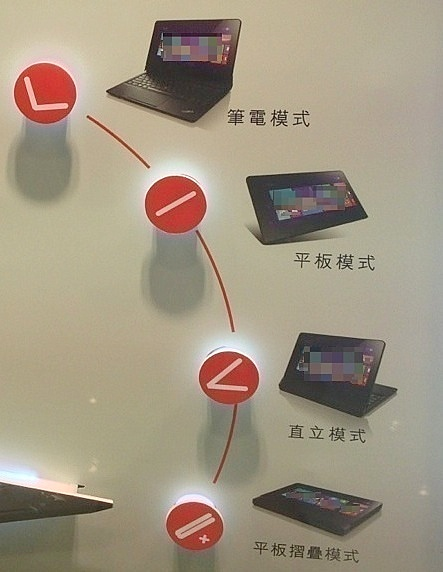
Various configurations of the ThinkPad Helix shown in a retail display in Hong Kong

The Helix serves as a conventional notebook computer but uses a "rip and flip" design that allows the user to detach the display and then replace it facing in a different direction. Also, as all essential processing hardware is contained in the display assembly and it has multitouch capability, the monitor can be used as a standalone tablet computer. The Helix features include Gorilla Glass, stylus-based input, and Intel vPro hardware-based security features, and is designed to appeal to business users. The Helix makes use of a refined version of the ThinkPad trackpoint. The five mechanical buttons featured on most ThinkPad trackpoints have been replaced with a fixed glass touchpad. The included pressure-sensitive stylus is from Wacom and fits into a dedicated slot in the tablet portion of the device.

The second-generation Helix introduced a vapor chamber cooling system with no moving parts, eliminating the need for fans and significantly reducing operating noise.

=== Specifications and performance ===
The Helix has an 11.6-inch 1080p IPS display that has ten-point capacitive multi-touch capability. At 400 nits the Helix's display is the brightest available among ThinkPad models. Connectors for mini-HDMI and mini-DisplayPort support graphics output. A five-megapixel rear camera and a two-megapixel front-facing camera are mounted on the display. The Helix comes standard with an Intel 3rd generation Core i5 processor, but can be upgraded to a Core i7 processor. On launch, the i7 upgrade for a convertible tablet was unique within its class. A SSD is used for HD storage. Fans are situated where the keyboard dock meets the tablet. This allows the Helix's processor to take advantage of Intel chipset capabilities to regulate clock speeds in relation to heat distribution. The Helix's power management software controls the speed of the processor to ensure that battery life is not adversely affected. The battery in the Helix's tablet section is advertised as providing five hours of use. Docking the tablet with the keyboard extends battery life by an advertised additional five hours.

The Helix is equipped with WiFi, NFC, and a cellular modem with support for 3G and 4G LTE SIM cards as an option. A LAN port is offered for wired networking capability. The entire device weighs almost four pounds and the tablet portion weighs less than two pounds.

== Reviews ==
In a review published in Forbes Jason Evangelho wrote, "The first laptop I owned was a ThinkPad T20, and the next one may very likely be the ThinkPad Helix which Lenovo unveiled at CES 2013. In a sea of touch-inspired Windows 8 hardware, it’s the first ultrabook convertible with a form factor that gets everything right. The first batch of Windows 8 ultrabooks get high marks for their inspired designs, but aren’t quite flexible enough to truly be BYOD (Bring Your Own Device) solutions. Lenovo’s own IdeaPad Yoga came close, but the sensation of feeling the keyboard underneath your fingers when transformed into tablet mode was slightly jarring. Dell‘s XPS 12 solved that problem with its clever rotating hinge design, but I wanted the ability to remove the tablet display entirely from both of those products."

Some critics praised the Helix's detachable "rip and flip" design as sturdier than many competitors, but noted its high price compared to other ultrabooks. In a review published in CNET Vincent Chang wrote, "It gets worse once you add the dock, with the weight of the Helix increasing to 1.67kg with the accessory. That's not exactly light for an 11.6-inch device when you can find slimmer 13.3-inch Ultrabooks, such as the Acer Aspire S7. Of course, the Helix is a hybrid device that can be used in more ways than one--you aren't saddled with the keyboard like a laptop." Chang concluded, "With a starting price of US$1,499, the ThinkPad Helix is pretty expensive, even for Ultrabook convertibles. However, its business slant means that companies, which can afford the premium price for the extra security and enterprise features, are most likely the ones to purchase the Helix."

In another review published by CNET editors wrote, "There's a lot to like about the Lenovo ThinkPad Helix. The engineers at Lenovo have come up with the best detachable docking hybrid system I've seen (although there may be no solution to the fact that these docking hinges are just inherently clunky). It feels sturdier and more reliable than many other hybrids, and the double battery system offers flexibility for longer work days."

In an early review for TechRadar Alex Roth wrote, "The Thinkpad Helix is exactly the kind of product Lenovo is known for: sturdy, versatile and designed for productivity to the point where it might [be] too niche for the average consumer. A lot of convertible tablet/ultrabooks look like just that, a tablet jammed into a keyboard stand. Not the Helix, all put together, it looks very much like one piece of equipment. As just a tablet, it's a great size and weight, making it easy to hold." However, by the time of its release, that opinion had soured somewhat: "When we first saw the Lenovo ThinkPad Helix at CES 2013, it had us really excited. We thought Lenovo had finally cracked the convertible ultrabook, a design we've never been totally sold on. But that was months ago, in a pre-Haswell, 12-hour MacBook Air world. The ThinkPad Helix is better late than never, but its $1,679 price point makes it tough to recommend."
