= ThinkPad Twist =

2-in-1 convertible tablet

The ThinkPad Twist is a 2-in-1 convertible tablet, that can function as a laptop and tablet released in 2012. The Twist is designed for business users and runs Microsoft's Windows 8 operating system.

== Features ==
=== Design ===
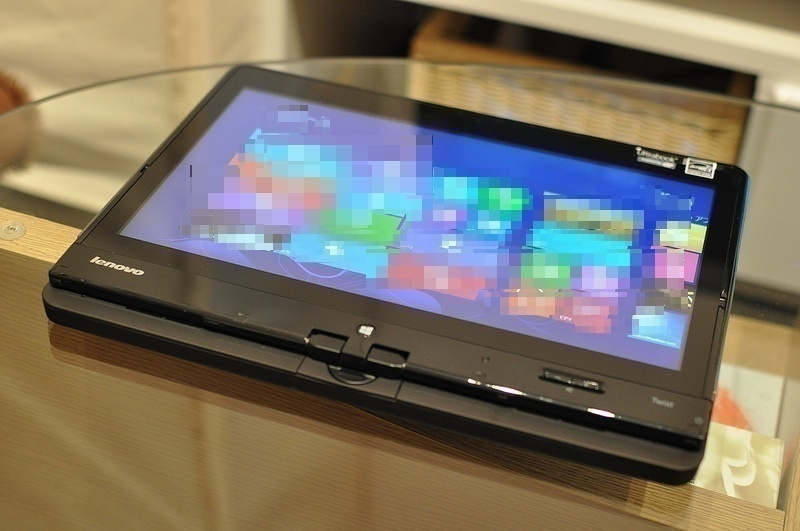
The ThinkPad Twist in tablet mode

The Twist is built to Intel's Ultrabook specification. Its look and feel are consistent with other ThinkPad devices. The Twist has a flat smooth cover with a soft rubbery finish and a flourish of silver-colored material around the edge. The outer case has both Lenovo and ThinkPad logos. Notably, the dot in the ThinkPad logo's "i" pulses when the unit is powered on. The Twist weights 3.5 pounds and is .8 inches thick. While not backlit, the Twist's island-style keyboard is spill-resistant and has U-shaped chiclet-style keys in order to enhance user comfort.

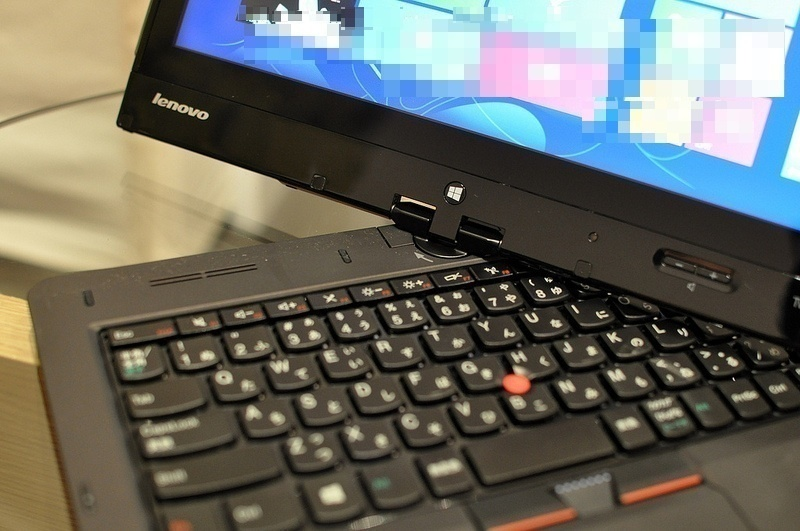
The ThinkPad Twist in action

=== Specifications and performance ===
The Twist has 12.5-inch multitouch display made with Gorilla Glass. Like the IdeaPad Yoga, its display, with a resolution of 1366 by 768 pixels, is connected to the base of the machine by a sturdy hinge capable of rotating 180 degrees in every direction. The display has brightness of 350 nits. This hinge, along with Windows 8, allows the Twist to serve as both a laptop and a tablet. A lock button at the bottom of the screen allows users to override the built-in accelerometer. The Twist does not have a discrete graphics processor; its display is powered by Intel's HD 4000 integrated graphics processor.

The Twist is available with a choice of three different Intel processors, up to 8GB of RAM, a choice of 7200RPM hard drives in 320GB and 500GB capacities or a much faster 128GB solid-state drive. An mSATA slot containing a 24GB SSD is used as cache for fast startup. The Twist also has two USB 3.0 ports, a mini-HDMI output, a mini DisplayPort, an Ethernet jack, a 3.5mm audio output, and a memory card reader.

In a test conducted by Engadget the Twist's 43 watt-hour battery was able to support 4 hours and 18 minutes of video playback with Wi-Fi on and the display set at 65-percent brightness. Lenovo claims a similar battery life.

Pre-installed software includes Evernote, Amazon's Kindle reader, Skype, AccuWeather, eBay, the streaming service rara.com, Microsoft Office, a trial of Norton Internet Security, Lenovo Support, and Lenovo Solutions for Small Business. Lenovo's proprietary support software includes a backup and restore utility, a USB blocker, software monitoring, power management tools, tune-up utilities, and Lenovo Cloud Storage, powered by SugarSync. Lenovo offers a free download of QuickLaunch, a utility that restores Windows' traditional Start Menu in order to avoid the new interface of Windows 8.

== Reception ==
In a review for Gadling Gear Kraig Becker wrote,"If you're in the market for a new laptop and you're looking to harness the full potential of Windows 8, the Lenovo Twist is a fantastic choice. I found that once I started using a touch screen notebook it was incredibly difficult to go back to a standard model. Touch just seems like a natural way to interact with our devices now and anything less seems archaic in comparison. Aside from sub-par battery life, I found the Twist to be a great laptop for the average traveler's needs, providing the ability to communicate with friends and family, while staying productive on the road. It's lightweight and thin body make it highly portable and the touch screen simply makes it fun to use. When was the last time you could say that about your laptop?"

In a review for TechRadar James Stables gave the device 4/5 stars and wrote, "The Lenovo ThinkPad Twist is well designed, sturdy and a strong performer. It'll also last you a good while, racking up over three and a half hours of battery use under moderate conditions. It's just as happy acting as a powerful tablet as it is a laptop, and while a little heavier than normal laptops, the versatility on offer makes it a machine worth considering if you're looking for a serious workhorse."

In a review for Engadget Dana Wollman wrote, "Lately, we feel like all of our reviews of Windows 8 convertibles end the same way. The ThinkPad Twist has plenty going for it: a bright IPS display, a good port selection, an affordable price and an unrivaled typing experience. Like ThinkPads past, it also offers some useful software features for businesses lacking dedicated IT departments. All good things, but what's a road warrior to do when the battery barely lasts four hours? Something tells us the Twist will still appeal to Lenovo loyalists, folks who trust ThinkPad's build quality and wouldn't be caught dead using any other keyboard. If you're more brand-agnostic, though, there are other Windows 8 convertibles with comfortable keyboards -- not to mention, sharper screens, faster performance and longer battery life."

A review published by the Financial Mail states, "The bang-up-to-date five-point multitouch screen measures 12.5 inches, with an HD resolution of 1366 x 768, topped with Gorilla Glass — protective and pretty. The screen looks great from all angles. My only complaint is the lost space: it has quite a thick bezel, and could have been that much more impressive with an edge-to-edge display."
