= Fit-PC3 =

fit-PC3
- Media: 2.5" 250 GB SATA hard disk mSATA SSD slot
- Operating system: Linux Mint; Windows 7
- CPU: AMD Fusion
- Memory: 2 x SO-DIMM
- Display: HDMI 1.4; DisplayPort
- Connectivity: 802.11b/g/n Wi-Fi; 1000baseT Ethernet up to 6 x USB 2.0 ports 2 x USB 3.0 ports line-out, line-in, microphone S/PDIF; RS232
- Power: 6.4 - 18W
- Dimensions: 6.3" x 6.3" x 0.98" (16 x 16 x 2.5 cm)

The fit-PC3 is a small, light, fan-less nettop computer manufactured by the Israeli company CompuLab. Several fit-PC3 variations are available - fit-PC3 was introduced early 2012. The device is power-efficient (about 6 - 18 W) and capable of using open source software and creating minimal electronic waste. It was designed principally for signage, surveillance, and telecommunication applications.

== fit-PC3 ==
The fit-PC3 has been released early 2012, CompuLab fit-PC3 includes:

- APU, (6.4W to 18W):

- AMD G-T44R single core processor @ 1.2Ghz with AMD Radeon HD 6250 Graphics
- AMD G-T40E dual core processor @ 1Ghz with AMD Radeon HD 6250 Graphics
- AMD G-T56N dual core processor @ 1.65Ghz with AMD Radeon HD 6320 Graphics

- Main I/O: AMD Embedded A55E Controller Hub
- Memory: Up to 8 GB DDR3-1333 (2 SO-DIMM sockets)
- Display: Dual-head HDMI 1.4 + DisplayPort (G-T40E model has HDMI 1.3a)
- Audio: Digital 7.1 channels S/PDIF, stereo line-out, line-in, mic
- Storage: Internal 2.5" SATA III hard disk, mSATA socket and 2 eSATA ports
- Networking: GbE + 802.11b/g/n Wi-Fi + BT 3
- I/O: 2 USB 3.0 ports + 2 USB 2.0 ports on the back panel + 4 USB 2.0 ports on the front (when using standard FACE Module). RS232.
- Expansion: 2 mini-PCI express sockets. One is usable as mSATA SSD drive with 2.3 board rev., the other is used by Wi-Fi when ordered with Wi-Fi
- Casing: Passively cooled die-cast aluminum 6.3" x 6.3" x 0.98" (16 x 16 x 2.5 cm). Higher wattage units use a ribbed heat sink type chassis.
- Custom extension board, (called FACE Module - Function And Connectivity Extension Module):

- FM-1LAN 1 GbE, 4 USB 2.0 ports, and 2 mini PCIe half sized slots
- FM-4E4U is 4 port GbE with 4 USB 2.0 ports.
- FM-E4U is 1 GbE with 4 USB 2.0 ports.
- FM-2MP has 2 mini-PCIe sockets.
- FM-VC Multiple input video & audio capture, including 2 USB 2.0 ports and serial port
- FM-USB3 has 2 USB 3.0 and 2 USB 2.0 ports, plus 1 mSATA SSD storage slot
- FM-POE is Quad LAN + Power over Ethernet, with 4 USB 2.0 ports.
- FM-SER 6 ports supporting RS232 / RS485 / RS422, and 2 CAN bus ports

== Model variations ==
Model Name	Processor & GPU	CPU cores	HDMI ver	Memory	Hard drive	Wi-Fi	FACE module	Gigabit Ethernet Ports	OS included	APU power	Case
Value Barebone	APU G-T44R (1.2 GHz + Radeon HD 6250)	1	1.3a	none	none	none	none	1	none	9W	plain
LP Barebone	APU G-T40E (1.0 GHz + Radeon HD 6250)	2	1.3a	none	none	none	none	1	none	6.4W	plain
LP Diskless	APU G-T40E (1.0 GHz + Radeon HD 6250)	2	1.3a	2GB DDR3 x2	none	802.11 b/g/n + BT 3	4 USB	1	none	6.4W	plain
Basic 4GB Linux	APU G-T40E (1.0 GHz + Radeon HD 6250)	2	1.3a	2GB DDR3 x2	250GB	802.11 b/g/n + BT 3	4 USB	1	Linux Mint	9W	plain
Basic 4GB Win7 Home Premium	APU G-T40E (1.0 GHz + Radeon HD 6250)	2	1.3a	2GB DDR3 x2	250GB	802.11 b/g/n + BT 3	4 USB	1	Windows 7 Home Premium	9W	plain
Pro Barebone	APU G-T56N (1.65 GHz + Radeon HD 6320)	2	1.4a	none	none	none	none	1	none	18W	ribbed
Pro Diskless	APU G-T56N (1.65 GHz + Radeon HD 6320)	2	1.4a	2GB DDR3 x2	none	802.11 b/g/n + BT 3	4 USB	1	none	18W	ribbed
Pro Linux	APU G-T56N (1.65 GHz + Radeon HD 6320)	2	1.4a	2GB DDR3 x2	250GB	802.11 b/g/n + BT 3	4 USB	1	Linux Mint	18W	ribbed
Pro Win7	APU G-T56N (1.65 GHz + Radeon HD 6320)	2	1.4a	2GB DDR3 x2	250GB	802.11 b/g/n + BT 3	4 USB	1	Windows 7 Pro	18W	ribbed
PC3i LP Barebone	APU G-T40E (1.0 GHz + Radeon HD 6250)	2	1.4a	none	none	802.11 b/g/n + BT 3	none	2	none	6.4W	plain
PC3i Pro Barebone	APU G-T56N (1.65 GHz + Radeon HD 6320)	2	1.4a	none	none	802.11 b/g/n + BT 3	none	2	none	18W	ribbed
fit-MultiLAN LP Linux	APU G-T40E (1.0 GHz + Radeon HD 6250)	2	1.4a	2GB DDR3 x2	320GB	802.11 b/g/n + BT 3	4 USB + 1 Gbit/s Ethernet	3 (2 back panel, 1 FACE)	Linux Mint	6.4W	plain
fit-MultiLAN Pro Linux	APU G-T56N (1.65 GHz + Radeon HD 6320)	2	1.4a	2GB DDR3 x2	320GB	802.11 b/g/n + BT 3	4 USB + 4; 1 Gbit/s Ethernet	6 (2 back panel, 4 FACE)	Linux Mint	18W	ribbed
Model Name	Processor & GPU	CPU cores	HDMI ver	Memory	Hard drive	Wi-Fi	FACE module	Gigabit Ethernet Ports	OS included	APU power	Case

== See also ==
- fit-PC
- Media PC
- Media center (disambiguation)
- Nettop
- Industrial PC
