= Fit-PC =

Small, light, fan-less computer

fit-PC2, fit-PC2i
- Media: 2.5" 160 GB SATA hard disk mini-SD slot
- Operating system: Linux Mint; Windows XP; Windows 7
- CPU: Intel Atom Z550 (2 GHz) / Z530 (1.6 GHz) / Z510 (1.1 GHz)
- Memory: 1 GB DDR2; Up to 2 GB
- Display: DVI 1920x1200 through HDMI connector
- Connectivity: 802.11b/g Wi-Fi; 1000baseT Ethernet (2x GbE in fit-PC2i); 6 x USB 2.0 ports (4 in fit-PC2i) line-out, line-in, microphone S/PDIF (and RS-232 in fit-PC2i)
- Power: 6W @ 12 V DC
- Dimensions: 10.1 x 11.5 x 2.7 cm

fit-PC Slim
- Media: 2.5" 60 GB IDE hard disk
- Operating system: Ubuntu; Gentoo Linux; Windows XP
- CPU: Geode LX 800
- Memory: 512 MB DDR SDRAM
- Display: VGA 1920x1440
- Connectivity: 802.11b/g Wi-Fi; 100BASE-TX Ethernet; 3 x USB 2.0 ports Headphones, microphone Serial
- Power: 6W @ 12 V DC
- Dimensions: 10 x 11 x 3 cm

fit-PC 1.0
- Media: 2.5" 40 GB (older versions) / 60 GB (newer versions) IDE hard disk
- Operating system: Ubuntu; Gentoo Linux; Windows XP
- CPU: Geode LX 800
- Memory: 256 MB DDR SDRAM
- Display: VGA 1920x1440
- Connectivity: 2 x 100BASE-TX Ethernet; 2 x USB 2.0 ports Headphones, microphone Serial
- Power: 5W @ 5 V DC
- Dimensions: 12 x 11.6 x 4 cm

The fit-PC is a small, light, fan-less nettop computer manufactured by the Israeli company CompuLab.

Many fit-PC models are available. fit-PC 1.0 was introduced in July 2007, fit-PC Slim was introduced in September 2008, fit-PC 2 was introduced in May 2009, fit-PC 3 was introduced in early 2012, and fit-PC 4 was introduced spring 2014. The device is power-efficient (fit-PC 1 was about 5 W) and therefore considered to be a green computing project, capable of using open source software and creating minimal electronic waste.

== Current models ==
=== fit-PC2 ===
On February 19, 2009, Compulab announced the fit-PC2, which is "a major upgrade to the fit-PC product line". Detailed specifications for the fit-PC2 include an Intel Atom Z5xx Silverthorne processor (1.1/1.6/2.0 GHz options), up to 2GB of RAM, 160GB SATA Hard Drive, Gigabit LAN and more. The fit-PC2 is also capable of HD video playback. Its declared power consumption is only 6W, and according to the manufacturer, it saves 96% of the power used by a standard desktop. fit-PC2 is the most power efficient PC on the Energy-Star list. The fit-PC2 is based on the GMA 500 (Graphics Media Accelerator). Unfortunately the open source driver included in Linux kernel 2.6.39 does not support VA-API video or OpenGL/3D acceleration. The fit-PC2 is being phased out and is being replaced by the fitlet, the fitlet was designed to replace the CompuLab fit-PC2.

=== fit-PC2i ===
On December 2, 2009, Compulab announced the fit-PC2i, a fit-PC2 variation targeting networking and industrial applications. fit-PC2i adds a second Gbit Ethernet port, Wake-on-LAN, S/PDIF output and RS-232 port, has two fewer USB ports, and no IR.

=== fit-PC3 ===
The fit-PC3 has been released early 2012. See the fit-PC3 article.

=== fit-PC4 ===
The fit-PC4 has been released spring 2014.

=== fitlet ===
The fitlet has been announced January 14, 2015. It has 3 CPU/SoC variations, and 5 feature variations, though only 7 models have been announced so far.

== Obsolete models ==
=== fit-PC Slim ===
On September 16, 2008, Compulab announced the Fit-PC Slim, which at 11 x 10 x 3 cm is smaller than fit-PC 1.0.

==== Hardware ====
fit-PC Slim uses 500 MHz AMD Geode LX800 processor and has 512mb soldered-on RAM. The computer includes a VGA output, a serial port with a custom connector, Ethernet, b/g WLAN, and 3 USB ports (2 on the front panel). The system has an upgradeable 2.5" 60GB ATA hard drive.

==== Software ====
fit-PC Slim has General Software BIOS supporting PXE and booting from a USB CDROM or USB thumb drive. It is pre-installed with either Windows Vista or with Ubuntu 8.10 and Gentoo Linux 2008.0 . Also Windows Embedded can be used, or pre-installed on a FlowDrive.

==== Availability ====
The fit-PC Slim end-of-life was announced on 19 June 2009 with the general availability of fit-PC2.

=== fit-PC 1.0 ===
fit-PC 1.0 is an earlier model that has the following differences

- Limited to 256 MB RAM
- No Wi-Fi
- Dual 100BaseT Ethernet
- Larger form factor - 12 × 11.6 × 4 cm
- Only 2 USB ports
- Hard disk is upgradeable
- No power button and indicator LEDs
- 5 V power supply

== See also ==
- Trim-Slice, an ARM mini-computer also made by CompuLab
- Industrial PC
- Media center (disambiguation)
- Media PC
- Nettop
