= IdeaCentre K series =

Desktop computer series by Lenovo

IdeaCentre K series is a family of gaming-oriented desktops manufactured by Lenovo. Typical features on the desktops include mid-range to high-end processors, discrete graphics cards, multiple hard disk drives, multiple RAM DIMMs, multiple USB ports, and multiple optical disk drives. The K Series desktops also come with a physical switch on the CPU that allows users to shift between different levels of processing power. For example, the K330 offered red for high performance, blue for moderate performance, and green for less processing- and resource-intensive tasks.

The IdeaCentre K Series desktops were originally part of the Lenovo 3000 line of products. This series consisted of budget-friendly computers – both laptops and desktops. In 2008, the Lenovo 3000 series was moved by Lenovo into its ‘Idea’ line of products. The Lenovo 3000 K100 desktop was replaced by the IdeaCentre K210. The IdeaCentre line was described as having improved in term of design, while retaining the low price that was characteristic of the Lenovo 3000 line.

== 2012 ==
The IdeaCentre K Series desktop released in 2012 was the K430.

=== K430 ===
The IdeaCentre K430 was introduced by Lenovo at CES 2012. The desktop, available in tower form factor, was described as being targeted at gamers, or users who needed similar levels of power. The desktop offered up to 32 GB of DDR3 RAM, with storage options of a 128 GB solid-state drive or up to 4 TB hard disk drives. The desktop could also be optionally equipped with twin hard disks in a RAID configuration.

A differentiator from Lenovo's other mainstream desktops was the choice of either NVIDIA or AMD discrete graphics. The NVIDIA graphics on offer was the GeForce GTX660 with 2 GB of video RAM. The AMD offering was the AMD Radeon HD 7750 with 2 GB of video RAM.

== 2011 ==
The IdeaCentre K Series desktops released in 2011 were the K320 and the K330.

=== K320 ===
The IdeaCentre K320 was scheduled for launch early in 2010. Top Ten Reviews indicated that the desktop was versatile and one of their favorite desktops for home use. The basic version of the desktop was equipped with an Intel Core i3-530 2.93 GHz processor, Intel Graphics Media Accelerator integrated graphics, 4 GB RAM, and a 500 GB hard disk drive. The processor could be upgraded to the Intel Core i5-750 2.66 GHz processor, or an Intel Core i7. The graphics card could also be updated to NVIDIA or AMD discrete graphics – an NVIDIA GeForce G310 with 512 MB of video RAM, or the ATI Hemlock HD graphics card with support for DirectX11. Hard drive capacity could be expanded to 640 GB or 1 TB.

=== K330 ===
The IdeaCentre K330 was also released in 2011. It offered Intel Core i3-2100 3.1 GHz processors, up to 4 GB RAM, up to 1 TB hard disk drive, Intel HD Graphics 2000 integrated graphics, Microsoft Windows 7 Home Premium, and a dual layer DVD reader and writer. The desktop did not score well on a benchmarking test for the game Crysis. At medium detail, a resolution of 1280x720, and antialiasing turned off, the desktop was able to achieve 12fps. At 1920x1080, with antialiasing set to 4x, the fps was 1. However, despite this, PCMag said in its review that, “With lots of new technology with very few drawbacks, the Lenovo IdeaCentre K330-11691AU has all the right components and features to keep a family happy for the next 5 to 7 years.”

== 2009 ==
The IdeaCentre K Series desktops launched in 2009 were the K220 and the K230.

=== K220 ===
The IdeaCentre K220 was released in 2009. The desktop was equipped with Intel Core 2 Quad Q8200 2.33 GHz processors, up to 4 GB RAM, a 640 GB hard disk drive, an NVIDIA GeForce 9300GE discrete graphics card, a dual layer DVD reader and writer, a 21.5” LCD widescreen, and Microsoft Windows Vista Home Premium.

In its review, PCMag listed the pros of the desktop as the quad core processors at a budget price, the one touch system recovery found in the K210, the antibacterial keyboard, and tool-less design. With VeriFace facial recognition technology, users could log on to their PC using the web camera. The cons were listed as the Trend Micro Internet Security software which was available only as a 90-day trial, the Microsoft Office installation also available as a trial only, and the fact that all memory slots were full, limiting expansion.

=== K230 ===
Also launched in 2009, the K230 was an upgraded version of the K220, offering up to Intel Core 2 Quad processors with speeds of 2.5 GHz, the Intel G33 Express chipset, up to 8 GB RAM, a 500 GB 7200RPM SATA II hard disk drive, Microsoft Windows Vista Home, and Intel Graphics Media Accelerator 3100 integrated graphics.

== 2008 ==
The first IdeaCentre K Series desktop from Lenovo was the K210, released in 2008.

=== K210 ===
The IdeaCentre K210 was termed as Lenovo’s “global entry into the consumer desktop market outside of China”. The desktop offered up to Intel Core 2 Quad processors, up to 3 GB of DDR2 RAM, Intel GMA X3100 integrated graphics – or a 512 MB ATI Radeon HD 2600 XT – Gigabit Ethernet, a 16-in-1 multicard reader and an anti-microbial keyboard. The desktop also included VeriFace facial recognition technology. This allowed users to log into their computers by looking into the web camera.

Additional features on the desktop included an anti-microbial keyboard and Bright Vision, which detects a user’s distance from the monitor and adjusts brightness accordingly. The desktop was equipped with up to Intel Core 2 Quad Processors, Intel GMA 3100 integrated graphics, Blu-ray HD-DVD combo with support for home theater, and high definition 5.1 audio.

PCMag praised the desktop for its one-touch system recovery feature, keyboard, and design which allowed access to internal component without the need for tools. The cons of the desktop were listed as the lack of multiple expansion slots – only one standard PCI expansion slot was available.
