= Chuwi =

Chuwi may refer to:

- Chuwi (company), Chinese electronics manufacturer
- Chuwi (band), Puerto Rican musical group
