= Utilite =

- Operating system: Ubuntu Linux / Android
- CPU: Freescale i.MX6 ARM Cortex A9
- Memory: 512 MB - 2 GB DDR3-1066
- Display: HDMI 1.4 full-HD + DVI
- Sound: S/PDIF 5.1; Stereo line-out / line-in
- Connectivity: 802.11b/g/n Wi-Fi (Standard/Pro only); Bluetooth 3.0 (Standard/Pro only); GbE Ethernet (Twin on Standard/Pro); 4 x USB 2.0 ports + USB OTG + 2 x serial RS-232
- Power: 4–8 W @ 10–16 V DC
- Dimensions: 13.5 x 10.0 x 2.1 cm
- Predecessor: Trim-Slice
- Website: utilite-computer.com

The Utilite is a small, fanless nettop computer manufactured by the Israeli company CompuLab. It was announced in July 2013 and is based upon the Freescale i.MX6 SoC.

It is available in Utilite Value, Utilite Standard and Utilite Pro models.

The Utilite is delivered with:

- Ubuntu 12.04 (soft-float or armel version) pre-installed.

Other available operating systems:

- Android 4.x
- Arch Linux ARM (hard-float or armhf version)
- Gentoo Linux source based distribution
- Kali Linux (armhf Debian 7 based - focused on security testing)

There exists also three Linux based operating systems specialized on media playback:

- XBMC
- GeeXbox
- Volumio (armhf Debian 7 based)

Both the Bootloader (U-Boot) and the Kernel are open source and can be found on Gitorious and GitHub.

== See also ==
- Industrial PC
