= IdeaCentre B series =

Series of personal computers

The IdeaCentre B Series all-in-one desktops from Lenovo were first launched in 2010. Like other desktops in the IdeaCentre product line, the B Series desktops were designed for home users, with a focus on the consumer PC segment. The first model in the series was the B500.

== 2012 ==
The IdeaCentre B Series desktops released in 2012 were the B340 and the B540.

=== B340 ===
The IdeaCentre B340 was introduced by Lenovo just before CES 2012. The B340 was a 21.5-inch touchscreen desktop designed for multimedia use. The all-in-one offered a 1080p HD display, with a maximum resolution of 1920x1080. Multiple Intel Core i processors were on offer, up to NVIDIA GeForce 615M discrete graphics with 1 GB of video RAM, up to 2 TB of storage space, and up to 8 GB of RAM.

The all-in-one also offered OneKey TV, allowing users to use the display for TV viewing, even if the PC had not been booted. The display could be configured for 3D output and Blu-ray compatibility.

=== B540 ===
Described as the "bigger brother" of the B340, the B540 offered a 23-inch widescreen display. Like the B340, this all-in-one also offered a 1080p HD touch screen, Intel processors, NVIDIA discrete graphics, and similar specifications for both storage capacity and memory.

A difference between the two was that the B540 had a frameless screen, with the glass surface extending from one edge of the display to the other. Another difference was the discrete graphics offering. The B540 could be equipped with an NVIDIA GeForce GT 650M, with up to 2 GB of video RAM.

== 2011 ==
The IdeaCentre B Series desktops released in 2011 were the B510 and the B520.

=== B510 ===
The IdeaCentre B510 was equipped with up to Intel Core i5-650 3.2 GHz processors, the Intel H55 Express chipset, up to 16 GB RAM, a 1TB 7200RPM hard disk drive, a 23-inch LCD with an aspect ratio of 16:9 and a maximum resolution of 1920x1080. The desktop supported ATI Radeon HD 5570 discrete graphics, HD audio with integrated stereo speakers, and had an integrated 0.3-megapixel web camera. As with most IdeaCentre B Series desktops, the B510 had a wireless Bluetooth mouse and keyboard.

=== B520 ===
Announced at CES 2011, the B520 was the successor to the B500 released in 2010. PC World described the AIO as the most attractive all-in-one they had seen. Among the new features included was multitouch support. The desktop also included up to Intel Core i7 processors, Intel HD 3000 integrated graphics or NVIDIA GeForce GT 555M discrete graphics. The discrete graphics card was necessary to take advantage of the desktop's 3D capabilities. The B520 could be equipped with up to 16 GB DDR3 RAM. Hard disk support for both SATA and Solid State Drive was available, with up to 2TB SATA hard disk drive or a 32 GB solid state drive. The B520 sported a 23-inch full HD display, with support for 3D Vision which was an optional feature. As with previous B Series desktops, the speakers were integrated, offering Dolby Surround Sound 5.0.

=== B320 ===
Lenovo IdeaCentre B320 all in one PC features include 2nd generation Intel Core i3 processor, a 21.5-inch Full HD display, supporting multi-touch technology, SRS Premium Sound audio enhancement and host of other multimedia applications embedded in it.

== 2010 ==
The IdeaCentre B Series desktops released in 2010 were the B500, B300, B305, and B310.

=== B500 ===
Released in 2010, the IdeaCentre B500 was an all-in-one (AIO) desktop with a sharp, angular design. The AIO had an aluminum cover below the screen, and a matching brushed metal effect on the Bluetooth keyboard. Engadget reported that the keyboard displayed issues with the wireless connection, a point that they indicated had been mentioned by other reviewers.

The B500 desktop released in Hong Kong had an Intel Core 2 Quad Q8400S processor. However, the US version of the desktop offered an Intel Pentium Dual Core E5400 processor or a Core 2 Duo E7500. The desktop could also be equipped with up to 4 GB RAM and a 500 GB 7200 RPM hard disk drive. The desktop offered NVIDIA GeForce GT240M discrete graphics which was capable of handling HD videos, but not games for hardcore gamers, as indicated by Engadget.

=== B300 ===
The B300 was another AIO released in the IdeaCentre B Series in 2010. PCWorld.in described it as a desktop for budget-conscious buyers. In terms of design, it was similar to the B500. However, the B500 was a 23-inch desktop, while the B300 was a 20-inch desktop. The B300 had a slim design resembling a photo frame with glossy black plastic. The stand was similar in design and made of plastic as well, unlike the A70z which sported a steel stand.

The desktop offered an Intel Core 2 Duo 3.03 GHz processor, ATI Radeon HD 5450 graphics, a maximum resolution of 1600x900, 4 GB RAM, and a 640 GB hard disk drive. The desktop also included six USB ports, as well as FireWire, Gigabit Ethernet, a multicard reader, and headphone and microphone jacks.

=== B305 ===
The IdeaCentre B305 was also released in 2010. It was an AIO, like other models in the series, and received contrasting reviews from PCMag and PC Pro.

PC Pro described the desktop as being admirably thin, comparing it to the 21.5 inch Apple iMacs. The B305 offered an identically sized screen, larger hard disk space (640 GB) and Windows 7 as opposed to OS X. Picture was described as having a “cold grey cast” while colors were indicated to be drab. The US version of the desktop offered a TV tuner and Media Center remote – however, the UK version did not have either. The 3 watt speakers had low volume, which necessitated the use of external speakers. The B305 was described by PC Pro as being suitable for Internet and office tasks, but not for use as a media center.

PCMag was more favorable in its review of the desktop. The desktop, which offered an AMD Athlon II X4 2.2 GHz processor, up to 4 GB RAM, and ATI Radeon HD 5450 discrete graphics, was described by PCMag as “a cut above more basic all-in-one desktops”. The pros were listed as the compact size, the discrete graphics, multi-touch 1080p HD screen, HDTV tuner, and wall mount. The cons were indicated to be the remote which required an IR dongle, the lack of a Blu-ray reader/writer, the lack of HDTV input besides the TV tuner, and the Microsoft Office 2007 installation, which was a trial only.

=== B310 ===
The last of the IdeaCentre B Series desktops released in 2010, the B310 could be equipped with Intel Core i3 or i5 processors, up to 4 GB RAM, and up to 1 TB hard disk drive. The desktop offered ATI Radeon HD 5450 discrete graphics, a 21.5-inch HD screen with an aspect ratio of 16:9 and integrated stereo speakers. The B310 also included touchscreen features, and several software applications from Lenovo which made use of this, including touch games, PowerCinema, VeriGesture, and AutoCollage.
