= Lenovo IdeaCentre Horizon =

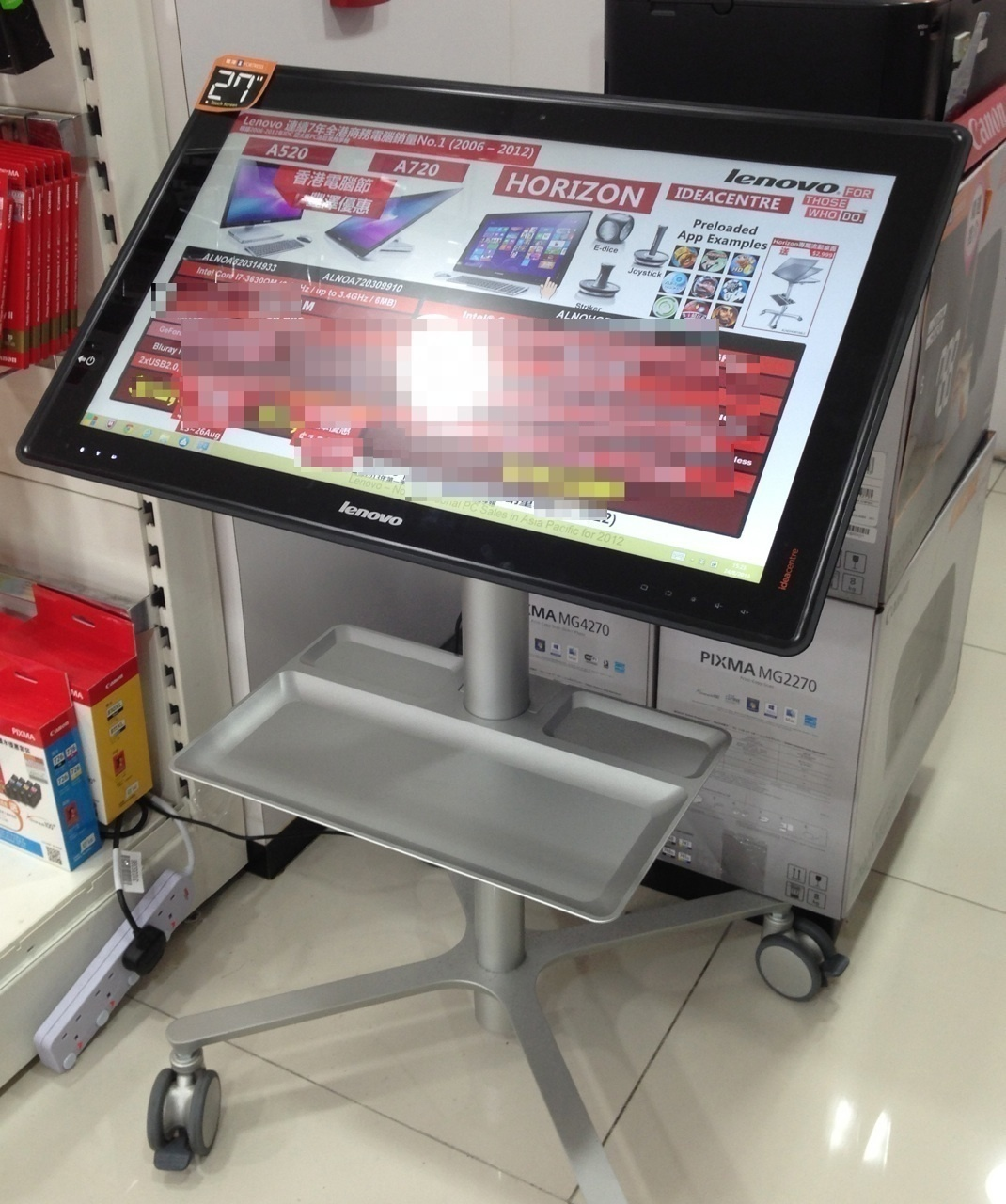
The Lenovo IdeaCentre Horizon on display in Hong Kong

The Lenovo IdeaCentre Horizon is a table PC released at the 2013 International CES as part of IdeaCentre brand. It features a 27-inch screen and supports multiple users. Designed for gaming, it can also serve as a desktop.

== Launch ==
The Horizon is Lenovo's first table computer. Peter Hortensius, a senior Lenovo executive said, "We've seen technology shifts across the four screens, from the desktop to the laptop, tablet and smartphone, and yet … there is still room for technologies like Horizon that bring people together." The Horizon was announced at the International CES in Las Vegas. Lenovo started selling the Horizon early in the summer of 2013 at a starting price of US$1,699.

== Design and features ==
The Horizon runs Windows 8 and has a 27-inch ten-point multitouch display with Aura, a software interface designed to support multiple simultaneous users. Touch based apps that can be launched with Aura include a photo browser, media players, games, and educational titles. The multitouch display, along with included detachable controllers in the form of joysticks, electronic dice, and air-hockey paddles, will facilitate game play, especially digital board games such as Monopoly. When the Horizon is placed flat a specialized user interface called a moon dial appears that allows interaction with the device from any direction. The unit can also be set upright via its rear kickstand to be used as conventional desktop computer paired with a keyboard and mouse.

The Horizon has an internal battery to enable unplugged use but its size, weight of 17 pounds, and two-hour battery life make it clearly not intended to be a mobile device. The Horizon uses Intel Core i3 and Core i7 processors, can hold up to 8GB of DDR3 RAM, can be ordered with hard drives up to 1TB in size, and includes Nvidia's GeForce graphics chips.

The Horizon comes with nine games pre-installed, each chosen in order to exploit the large screen and its multitouch capabilities. Major game and app developers such as Electronic Arts, FableVision, Open Labs, Ubisoft, and FilmOn TV have cooperated with Lenovo to release software for the Horizon. Lenovo has launched an app store dedicated to the Horizon. Lenovo allows anyone to download the Horizon's software development kit.

The Horizon was displayed with a four-wheel stand that is probably best suited for institutional environments. Lenovo also displayed the Horizon mounted flat in a coffee table with motorized sliding leaves that conceal the electronics entirely, making the table look like a normal piece of furniture. A set of motors in the table allows the screen to be raised and titled like a conventional desktop computer. Lenovo sells an optional rolling table for US$300.

== Reviews and awards ==
The Horizon was named by CNET's editors "Best of CES PCs and Tablets" for 2013. CNET stated, "Lenovo's Horizon Table PC received the award in the PCs and tablets category because it offers multiple new ways to use a computer, including a new way to integrate a PC into your home. It inspires conversation and some new thinking, and for that the Horizon deserves recognition."

In a review, Alex Roth of TechRader wrote, "When you look at it as an all-in-one, the Lenovo Horizon Table PC isn't so niche. Packing everything inside that 27-inch touch display for the sort of simple, elegant presentation we usually see from Apple. While the reclined mode is the most fun, it's also the least practical. If you've got the space, it would be a great way to share vacation photos or play a board game or two. The fact that Lenovo has garnered support from EA Games and Ubisoft, giants of the gaming space, has us hopeful that more apps will be designed for this unique device. Finally, it's not terribly expensive either, at least for the lower end version. i3 configurations start at only $999, so even if you're not running your own graphic design firm, the Horizon Table PC isn't out of your reach."

In a review for the New York Times David Pogue wrote, "One thing the Horizon certainly is, though, is novel. The concept really is fresh. And it neatly dispenses with the common refrain that electronic entertainment encourages isolation and represents a step down from the olden days, when families gathered around the coffee table for game nights." Pogue also stated, "Sadly, game nights around the Horizon may not become as much of a tradition as the old board games made of wood or cardboard. First, because as clever as the Aura world is, the games are a little laggy. You can get a little frustrated playing the air hockey game. It’s just not as responsive as you’d like. Often, that sluggishness really saps some of the joy."
