= GestureWorks Gameplay =

- Company type: Multitouch game controllers
- Headquarters: Corrales, New Mexico
- Website: gameplay.gestureworks.com

GestureWorks Gameplay was a utility created by Ideum using its GestureWorks technology to enable a variety of touch and gesture controls for games on Windows 8 devices. The software was discontinued as of June 7, 2016.

The Gameplay utility was used to create and use touchscreen controllers for PC games running on Windows 8 without the need for an external controller or mouse and keyboard. Users could select from a wide variety of onscreen buttons and gesture controls that may be mapped to keyboard and mouse commands used within the game. Accelerometer support was also available for many devices. In addition to providing a control overlay on mobile devices, Gameplay was compatible with Android devices so that gamers could use their Android device with Bluetooth as a controller for their PC games. Gameplay controls were highly customizable and some aspects of the controls such as button size and location could even be adjusted during gameplay while the controller was in use.

In addition to allowing users to create their own controllers, there was a library of pre-built controllers authored by Gestureworks Gameplay and members of the community, containing more than 250 virtual controllers. Gameplay was available through Steam.

GestureWorks Gameplay received favorable reviews from Penny Arcade's Gabe (Mike Krahulik), and Tom's Hardware. The Behemoth games reviewed GestureWorks Gameplay as a good new way to make their popular Castle Crashers game tablet-friendly, and The Behemoth project manager Emil Ayoubkhan says GestureWorks Gameplay is "a perfect fit" for bringing their game to tablet PCs. The technology was also featured in a keynote speech at the Intel Developer Forum in 2013.
