= GMKtec =

Mini PC company

Shenzhen GMK Technology Co., Ltd.
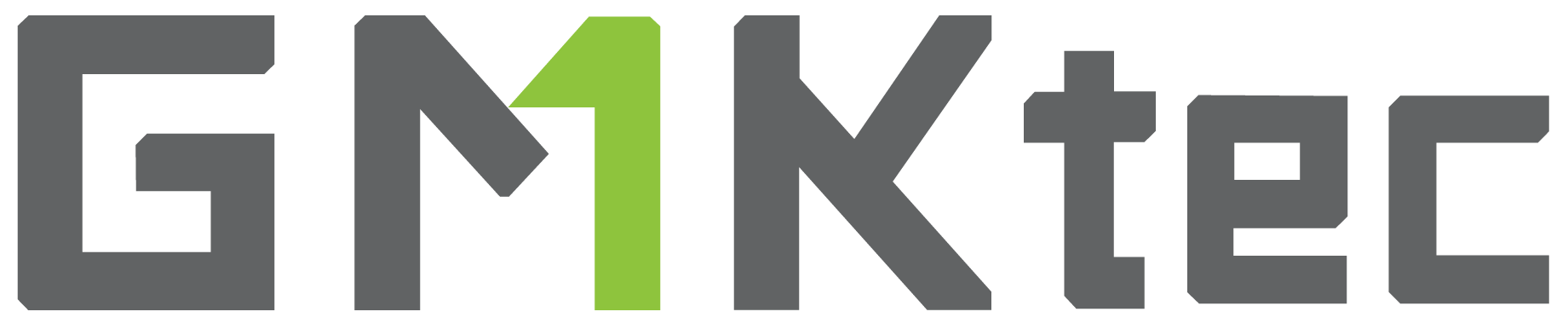
- Trade name: GMKtec
- Native name: 深圳市极摩客科技有限公司
- Company type: Private
- Industry: Computer hardware
- Founded: 2019; 7 years ago
- Headquarters: Shenzhen, Guangdong, China
- Products: Mini PC
- Website: www.gmktec.com

Shenzhen GMK Technology Co., Ltd., which uses the trade name, GMKtec (Chinese: 极摩客; pinyin: Jí Mó Kè) is a Chinese technology company headquartered in Shenzhen. It specializes in mini PCs.

== History ==
GMKtec was founded in 2019.

In recent years GMKtec has been increasing technological development and has applied for numerous patents.

== Products ==
In March 2025, GMKtec received attention when its EVO-X2 mini PC was shown off at the AMD Greater China Channel Summit with several models being personally signed by AMD CEO, Lisa Su. GMKtec being considered a small player was said to receive preferential treatment which marked a milestone in AMD backing it. GMKtec claimed EVO-X2 was the world's first AI mini PC equipped with the AMD Ryzen AI Max+ 395 processor.

In August 2025, the EVO-T1 mini PC was released. According TechRadar, at the time it was the fastest Intel mini PC tested.

== See also ==
- Beelink
- GEEKOM
- Minisforum
