= IdeaCentre =

Series of personal computers

Lenovo IdeaCentre
- Wordmark used in marketing since 2023

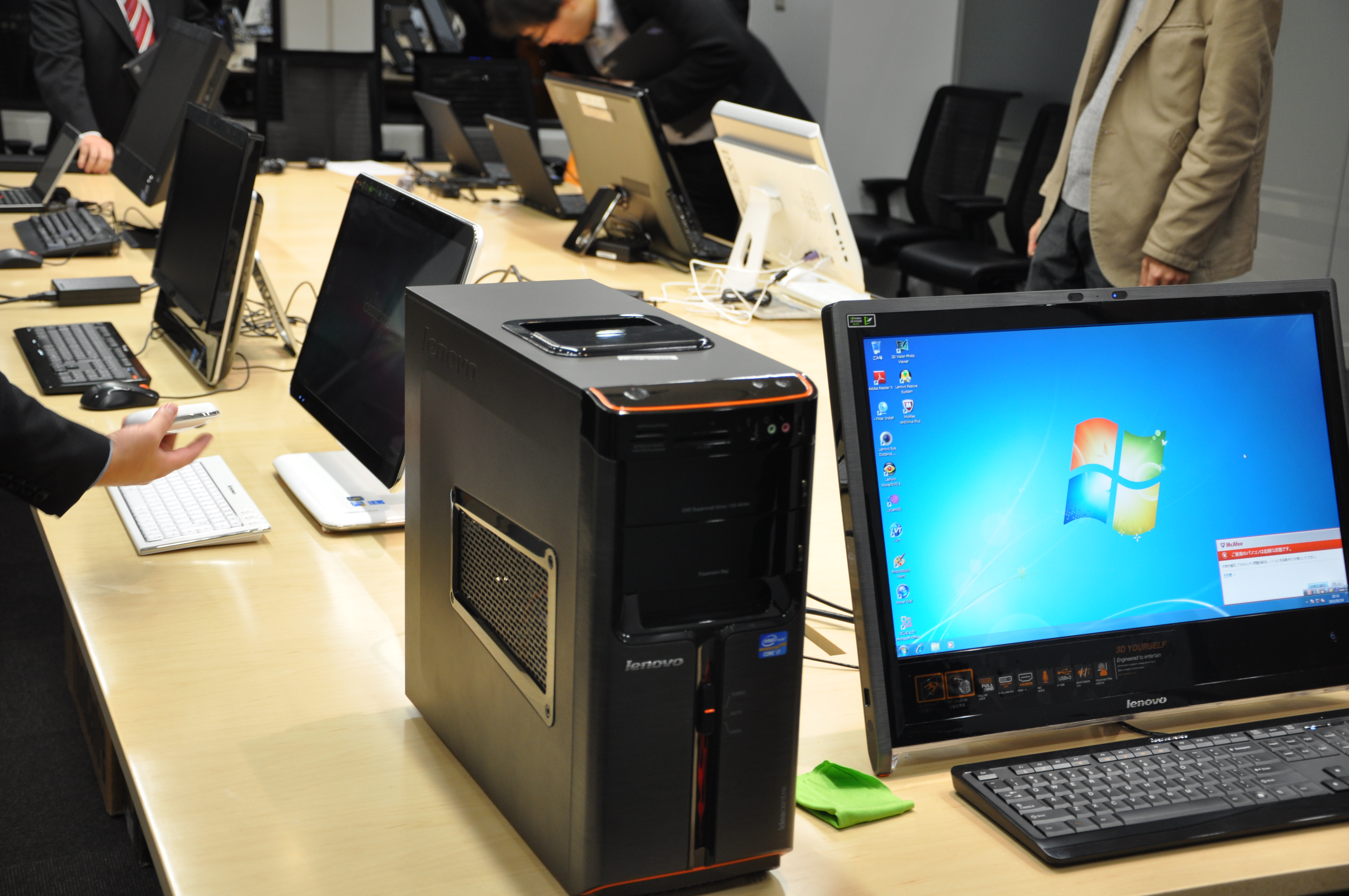
- IdeaCentre computers
- Developer: Lenovo
- Manufacturer: Lenovo
- Type: Desktop/All-in-One PC
- Released: January 2008; 18 years ago
- Operating system: Windows
- CPU: AMD APU, Intel Core i3, Intel Core i5, Intel Core i7, AMD Ryzen
- Graphics: AMD Radeon, Nvidia GeForce
- Marketing target: Consumer / Home purpose
- Predecessor: Lenovo 3000
- Related: IdeaPad

The Lenovo IdeaCentre is a line of consumer-oriented desktop computers designed, developed and marketed by Lenovo. The first IdeaCentre desktop, the IdeaCentre K210, was announced by Lenovo on 30 June 2008 as a consumer-focussed alternative to the business-oriented ThinkCentre and ThinkStation brandnames acquired from IBM. While the IdeaCentre line consists entirely of desktops, they share a common design language with the IdeaPad line of laptops and hybrids. One such feature is Veriface facial recognition technology.

== Product series ==
=== A Series ===
Lenovo's IdeaCentre A Series is a line of all-in-one desktops designed primarily for home use.

=== B Series ===
The IdeaCentre B Series all-in-one desktops from Lenovo were first launched in 2010. Like other desktops in the IdeaCentre product line, the B Series desktops were designed for home users. The first model in the series was the B500.

=== K Series ===
The 'IdeaCentre K Series desktops from Lenovo are described by the manufacturer as being gaming-oriented desktops. Typical features on the desktops include mid-range to high-end processors, discrete graphics cards, multiple hard disk drives, multiple RAM DIMMS, multiple USB ports, and multiple optical disk drives. The K Series desktops also come with a physical switch on the CPU that allows users to shift between different levels of processing power. For example, the K330 offered red for high performance, blue for moderate performance, and green for less processing- and resource-intensive tasks.

The IdeaCentre K Series desktops were originally part of the Lenovo 3000 line of products. This series consisted of budget-friendly computers – both laptops and desktops. In 2008, the Lenovo 3000 series was moved by Lenovo into its ‘Idea’ line of products. The Lenovo 3000 K100 desktop was replaced by the IdeaCentre K210. The IdeaCentre line was described as having improved in term of design, while retaining the low price that was characteristic of the Lenovo 3000 line.

=== Q Series ===
The IdeaCentre Q Series PCs from Lenovo are a series of nettops meant primarily for home and personal use. The Q Series nettops are described by the manufacturer as being multimedia-oriented nettops. Comparing the size to a typical paperback book, Lenovo describes the Q Series nettops as the smallest desktops in production. The general features of the Q Series desktops are the small size, low energy requirements, ability to play HD video, and low noise levels.

These nettops are designed to be extremely compact processing units. A nettop is a desktop computer that uses the same (or similar) components found in netbook PCs. The first nettop in the IdeaCentre Q series was the Q100, launched in 2009.

=== Y Series ===
==== Y900 Razer Edition ====
Lenovo's Y900 Razer Edition gaming PC is the result of a partnership announced with Razer in November 2015. Lenovo equipped its existing IdeaCenter Y900 model with Razer's Chroma Full Spectrum lighting. The two companies say it is the first of many planned joint projects. This version of the Y900 is also bundled with Razer's Blackwidow Chroma mechanical keyboard and Mamba Chroma mouse. Lenovo says future products will include Razer software such as Comms, Synapse, and Cortex.

=== Gaming Series ===
IdeaCentre Gaming 5i was announced in April, 2020. With the product's focus on gaming performance, the desktop features NVIDIA's GeForce graphics cards, unlike its IdeaCentre variants with integrated graphics. Lenovo designed the Gaming 5i with a future-proofed functionality, allowing modularity for manual upgrades to its system components though as of 2025, the product has been withdrawn from production.

=== Horizon ===
The IdeaCentre Horizon is a table pc released at the 2013 International CES. The Horizon features a 27-inch screen and is designed for multiple simultaneous users. It was designed specifically with gaming in mind but can also serve as a desktop computer The Horizon is Lenovo's initial entry into nascent table computer market. Peter Hortensius, a senior Lenovo executive said, "We've seen technology shifts across the four screens, from the desktop to the laptop, tablet and smartphone, and yet … there is still room for technologies like Horizon that bring people together." The Horizon was announced at the International CES in Las Vegas. Lenovo will start selling the Horizon early in the summer of 2013 at a starting price of US$1,699.

=== Stick ===
Lenovo started shipping the ideacentre Stick 300 in July 2015. The Stick 300 plugs into any computer display or television with HDMI. It is based on the Intel Atom Z3735 processor, has 32 gigabytes of storage, 2 gigabytes of RAM, a MicroSD card slot, a full-sized USB 2.0 port, 802.11 b/g/n Wi-Fi, and Bluetooth 4.0. It was released with Windows 8.1 with a free upgrade to Windows 10.

== 2025 ==
=== IdeaCentre Mini ===
The IdeaCentre Mini was released in April 2025. It is a low-profile desktop computer designed as a competitor to the Mac Mini. It comes with up to a Intel Core i7-13700H Central processing unit, up to 16 gigabytes of DDR4 RAM, and up to one terabyte of SSD-based storage. It uses the Integrated graphics which come with the Intel processors.

== 2016 ==
=== IdeaCentre 610S ===
The IdeaCentre 610S is a small-chassis desktop computer that uses both a monitor and an included detachable projector. The 610S has a pyramid-shaped case. The projector is designed to fit on top but can also be placed in other positions. The projector has 720p resolution and a brightness rating of 220 lumens. The 610S comes standard with an Intel Core i7 processor, supports up to 16 gigabytes of RAM, and has an Nvidia GeForce 750Ti graphics card. A choice of a 2-terabyte hard drive or a 128-gigabyte SSD is standard.

=== IdeaCentre 700 ===
The IdeaCentre 700 can be purchased as an All-in-one computer or a desktop. The All-in-one computer has a 23.8-inch touchscreen with 1080p resolution. It comes standard with an Intel "Skylake" Core i5-6400 central processor with 2.8-gigahertz base clock speed, 8 gigabytes of DDR4 RAM, and a 2-terabyte hard drive, an Nvidia GeForce GT 930A graphics processor with 2 gigabytes of VRAM, and an optical drive. An Intel RealSense camera is included for logging in via facial recognition and video chat. The desktop has Intel Core i7 6th Gen 6700 (3.4 GHz) [Gigahertz], 12 GigaBytes of DDR4, 1 Terabyte Hard Drive, 120 GB Solid State Drive, an Nvidia Geforce GTX 960 dedicated graphics card, and generally is installed with Windows 10 Home. However the desktop does include a touchscreen monitor.

== 2011 ==
At CES 2011, Lenovo announced the launch of four IdeaCentre desktops: the A320, B520, B320, and C205. All desktops were designed as All-in-ones, combining processor and monitor into a single unit. The desktops were described by HotHardware as being "uniquely designed," with users needing to "gaze on each one to see which design would look best in your place."

== 2010 ==
Lenovo announced three IdeaCentre desktops at CES 2010: the A300, C310, and K320. The A300 was the industry's thinnest desktop at the time – only 1.85 cm thick. The desktop was designed to be asymmetrical, with the processor in the base as opposed to AIO conventions, in which the processor was located behind the screen. The desktop had a 21.5” full HD LED screen, up to Intel Core 2 Duo processors, an integrated web camera, HDMI in/out, integrated 802.11n Wi-Fi, and a wireless Bluetooth mouse and keyboard. Software on the desktop included Lenovo Rescue System for data recovery and CamSuite.

The IdeaCentre C310 was Lenovo's first multitouch all-in-one desktop. The 20” HD 16:9 widescreen included the Lenovo NaturalTouch Panel for touch screen technology. A collection of applications optimized for touch use was also included called Lenovo's IdeaTouch, with an interactive user login through VeriTouch software. The desktop included Intel Atom 330 Dual Core processors, up to 4 GB RAM, and the ATI Mobility Radeon HD 4530 512 MB discrete graphics card.

The IdeaCentre K320 was described as a “performance gaming desktop” by Daily Connect. The desktop was equipped with up to Intel Core i7 processors, up to ATI Radeon HD 5970 2 GB discrete graphics, up to 8 GB DDR3 memory, and up to 1 TB hard disk drive. The desktop also included the front-mounted Lenovo Power Control Switch found on the K300 desktop. This allowed users to choose between energy efficiency and greater CPU power. Bright Vision Technology was available, automatically adjusting brightness according to the user's distance from the screen and the intensity of surrounding light.

== 2009 ==
In August 2009, two new series of IdeaCentre desktops were announced: the Q Series and the D Series.

The first desktops in the Q Series were the Q700, Q100, and Q110. The Q700 was Lenovo's first home theatre PC, with high definition 1080p playback, digital surround sound and compatibility with an HDTV. The Q100 and Q110 were extremely thin desktops, dubbed ‘nettops’ by Lenovo, with dimensions of 6”x6.3”x0.7”. These desktops were slim enough to be mounted on the back of a monitor. The Q100 was also energy efficient, using only 14 watts of power when idle and 40 watts when in full use.

The first desktop in the D Series was the D400. The D400 desktop was designed as a home server, offering up to 8 TB of storage space, support for multiple external storage devices with five USB ports. An eSATA port allowed high speed data transfer. Additional features of the desktop included the ability to duplicate data on multiple hard disks and remote access to the server.

In October 2009, three IdeaCentre desktops were announced: the B500, K300, and H230. The B500 desktop was equipped with an Intel Core 2 Quad processor, up to 8 GB of DDR3 RAM, up to 1TB hard disk drive, a 23” full HD screen, and JBL integrated speakers. The desktop also included a 4-in-1 remote control that could be used as a motion controller for games, a VoIP handset, an air mouse, and a media remote. A feature that was described as unique by Lenovo was the CamSuite software, designed to keep users in the center of the web camera's focus area.

The IdeaCentre K300 desktop was described by Lenovo as a “performance desktop”. The desktop included an Intel Core 2 Quad processor and hard disk drives configured for RAID. Another feature on the desktop was the Lenovo Power Control Switch, allowing users to adjust power utilization between energy efficiency and superior performance.

The IdeaCentre H230 desktop was described by Lenovo as “the perfect mix of performance and value”. The desktop offered the Intel Core 2 Duo E7500 processor, up to 8 GB RAM, and a 500 GB SATA hard disk drive. The desktop was also equipped with Lenovo Rescue System for data recovery.
