= Surface computer =

Computer that interacts with users via the surface of an object

A surface computer is a computer that interacts with the user through the surface of an ordinary object, rather than through a monitor, keyboard, mouse, or other physical hardware.

The term "surface computer" was first adopted by Microsoft for its PixelSense (codenamed Milan) interactive platform, which was publicly announced on 30 May 2007. Featuring a horizontally mounted 30-inch display in a coffee table-like enclosure, users can interact with the machine's graphical user interface by touching or dragging their fingertips and other physical objects such as paintbrushes across the screen, or by setting real-world items tagged with special bar-code labels on top of it. As an example, uploading digital files only requires each object (e.g. a Bluetooth-enabled digital camera) to be placed on the unit's display. The resulting pictures can then be moved across the screen, or their sizes and orientation can be adjusted as well.

PixelSense's internal hardware includes a 2.0 GHz Core 2 Duo processor, 2GB of memory, an off the shelf graphics card, a scratch-proof spill-proof surface, a DLP projector, and five infrared cameras to detect touch, unlike the iPhone, which uses a capacitive display. These expensive components resulted in a price tag of between $12,500 to $15,000 for the hardware.

The first PixelSense units were used as information kiosks in the Harrah's family of casinos. Other customers were T-Mobile, for comparing several cell phones side by side, and Sheraton Hotels and Resorts, to service lobby customers in numerous ways. These products were originally branded as "Microsoft Surface", but was renamed "Microsoft PixelSense" on June 18, 2012, after the manufacturer adopted the "Surface" name for its new series of tablet PCs.

== See also ==
- Surface computing
- Table computer
- TouchLight
- Jeff Han FTIR
- Spatial computing
