= Trim-Slice =

Nettop computer manufactured by the Israeli company CompuLab

- Media: 32 GB SATA SSD; SD slot Internal micro-SD slot
- Operating system: Ubuntu Linux
- CPU: Nvidia Tegra 2
- Memory: 1 GB DDR2-800
- Display: HDMI 1.3 full-HD + DVI
- Sound: S/PDIF 5.1; Stereo line-out / line-in
- Connectivity: 802.11n Wi-Fi; 1000baseT Ethernet; 4 x USB 2.0 ports RS232
- Power: 3 W @ 8-16 V DC
- Dimensions: 9.5 x 13.0 x 1.5 cm
- Successor: Utilite

The Trim-Slice is a small, fanless nettop computer manufactured by the Israeli company CompuLab. Trim-Slice is the first commercially available desktop computer based on the NVIDIA Tegra 2. It was announced in January 2011 and began shipping in late April 2011.

In July 2013 CompuLab announced its successor, the Utilite computer, a single to quad core computer based on the Freescale i.MX6 SoC which has since then become one of the most popular fanless computers worldwide.

== See also ==
- Industrial PC
