= IdeaCentre Q series =

Line of nettop computers

The Lenovo IdeaCentre Q series are a line of nettop computers meant primarily for home and personal use. The Q Series nettops are described by the manufacturer as being multimedia-oriented nettops. Comparing the size to a typical paperback book, Lenovo describes the Q Series nettops as the smallest desktops in production. The general features of the Q Series desktops are the small size, low energy requirements, ability to play HD video, and low noise levels.

These nettops are designed to be extremely compact processing units. A nettop is a desktop computer that uses the same (or similar) components found in netbook PCs. The first nettop in the IdeaCentre Q series was the Q100, launched in 2009.

== 2010 ==
The only nettop released in 2010 in the IdeaCentre Q series was the Q150.

=== Q150 ===
Released in 2010, the IdeaCentre Q150 was a nettop like its predecessors: the Q100 and the Q110. In its review of the nettop, SlashGear described it as “a great little media PC that serves up high definition content with minimal fuss.”

The single core Intel Atom processor found in 2009's Q-series nettops was replaced by the Intel Atom D510 processor, with two cores at 1.66 GHz. The nettop also included 2 GB DDR2 RAM, a 500 GB hard disk drive, and NVIDIA Nvidia Ion 2 graphics with support for DirectX 10.

Unlike its predecessors, the Q150 also included Wi-Fi b/g/n. Ports on the nettop were available for HDMI, VGA, two USB, Ethernet, and audio input and output. A stand was provided to support the nettop, and a VESA mount was provided as an alternative, so the nettop could be kept behind a TV or a monitor.

PCMag received the Q150 positively, calling it “one of the smallest full-featured PCs” and saying, “The Lenovo IdeaCentre Q150 is designed to be dropped on a desk or bolted behind an HDTV. It's one of the best web video/photo/music media consumption devices out there, once you've hooked up to a big screen.” PCMag gave the nettop a rating of four out of five stars as well as an Editor's Choice award.

== 2009 ==
The IdeaCentre Q-series nettops released by Lenovo in 2009 were the Q100, Q110, and the Q700.

=== Q100 ===
The Q100 nettop was slightly larger than a typical external hard disk drive, with a plastic stand to allow it to remain upright. The nettop was equipped with a 1.6 GHz Intel Atom 230 processor, which was designed for low power consumption rather than processing power. The nettop also included 1 GB of DDR2-667 RAM, and a 160 GB hard disk drive. While the storage space was limited, PCWorld indicated that this was common in other, similar nettops, citing the Acer Aspire Revo 3610 and the MSI Wind Nettop CS120 as examples. While the nettop had four USB ports and a Gigabit Ethernet port there was no optical drive, and a mouse and keyboard were not included in the price. The Q100 could support a single VGA monitor. In its review of the nettop, PCWorld gave the PC one of five stars and indicated that it made a netbook seem like a better option.

=== Q110 ===
Like the Q100, the Q110 nettop was also 0.7 inches thin and featured the 1.6 GHz Intel Atom N230 processor. Also like the Q100, a keyboard and mouse was not included. The differences between the two nettops, however, were that the Q110 had 2 GB RAM, a 250 GB hard disk drive, NVIDIA Ion graphics, and a 1080p HDMI output.

=== Q700 ===
Launched in mid-2009, the Q700 was the Q series' third nettop from Lenovo released in that year. Unlike the Q100 and the Q110, the Q700 featured an Intel Pentium Dual Core E5700 processor, 4 GB RAM, and Intel Graphics Media Accelerator X4500 integrated graphics. The Q700 measured 2.36 x 7.87 x 9.84 inches, and could be equipped with up to a 640 GB hard disk drive. A HDMI output port was also present, as well as options for Wi-Fi b/g, a TV tuner, and different version of Windows Vista. The front of the nettop included four USB 2.0 ports, a slot-loading DVD writer, a four-in-one media card reader, as well as headphone and microphone jacks. The back of the nettop included an additional four USB 2.0 ports.
