= Beelink =

Mini PC company

Beelink, Inc
- Native name: 零刻
- Type: Subsidiary
- Industry: Computer hardware
- Founded: 2011; 15 years ago
- Headquarters: Shenzhen, Guangdong, China
- Products: Mini PC
- Parent: Shenzhen AZW Technology Company
- Website: www.bee-link.com

Beelink, Inc (Beelink; Chinese: 零刻; pinyin: Líng Kè) is a Chinese technology company headquartered in Shenzhen. It specializes in mini PCs.

== History ==
Beelink was founded in 2011. It is a subsidiary of Shenzhen AZW Technology Company which has other mini PC brands such as Trigkey.

In July 2024, it was reported that Beelink has been the subject of controversy on social media for its released products including the GTi14 Ultra. Netizens expressed both positive as well as negative comments about the products. Frequently there were complaints about encountering product issues as well as product return policies.

In July 2025, a video released by the channel SatisFactory Process gave a 22-minute showcase on the production of Beelink's mini PC from start to finish. The video went viral gaining nearly two million viewers at the time.

== Products ==
In May 2025, Beelink announced the GTR9 Pro, a mini PC aimed at AI workloads, gaming, and content creation. At a price of $1999, it was speculated to be biggest rival to the Nvidia DGX Spark AI workstation.

== See also ==
- GEEKOM
- GMKtec
- Minisforum
