= Minisforum =

Mini PC company

Shenzhen Meigao Electronic Equipment Co., Ltd
- Trade name: Minisforum
- Native name: 深圳市美高電子設備有限公司／深圳市美高电子设备有限公司
- Type: Private
- Industry: Computer hardware
- Founded: 2018; 8 years ago
- Headquarters: Shenzhen, Guangdong, China
- Products: Mini PC
- Website: www.minisforum.com

Shenzhen Meigao Electronic Equipment Co., Ltd, which uses the trade name Minisforum (simplified Chinese: 铭凡; traditional Chinese: 銘凡; pinyin: Míng Fán) is a Chinese technology company headquartered in Shenzhen. It specializes in mini PCs.

== History ==
Minisforum was founded in 2018. Shortly after its founding, it obtained licenses from both AMD and Intel.

On 6 December 2022, it was reported that Minisforum held a signing ceremony with CITIC Securities to prepare for an A-share initial public offering.

In 2025, Minisforum applied for multiple patents. It obtained patents related to controlling a mini PC's operating status information, external GPU expansion docks and power management. The intention is to increase the performance of its products.

== Products ==
In May 2025, Minisforum announced the MS-S1 Max, a 2U rackmount system powered by AMD's Ryzen AI Max+ 395. It was speculated to be game changing as server racks traditionally used AMD's Epyc processors which were designed for server use and therefore were more expensive. The new system would be more cost-effective and power-efficient which could potentially undermine AMD's Epyc business. In August 2025, it was revealed the MS-S1 Max would be the first computer to come with dual USB4 v2 ports.

== See also ==
- Beelink
- GEEKOM
- GMKtec
