= Geekom =

Consumer electronics company specializing in mini PCs

GEEKOM
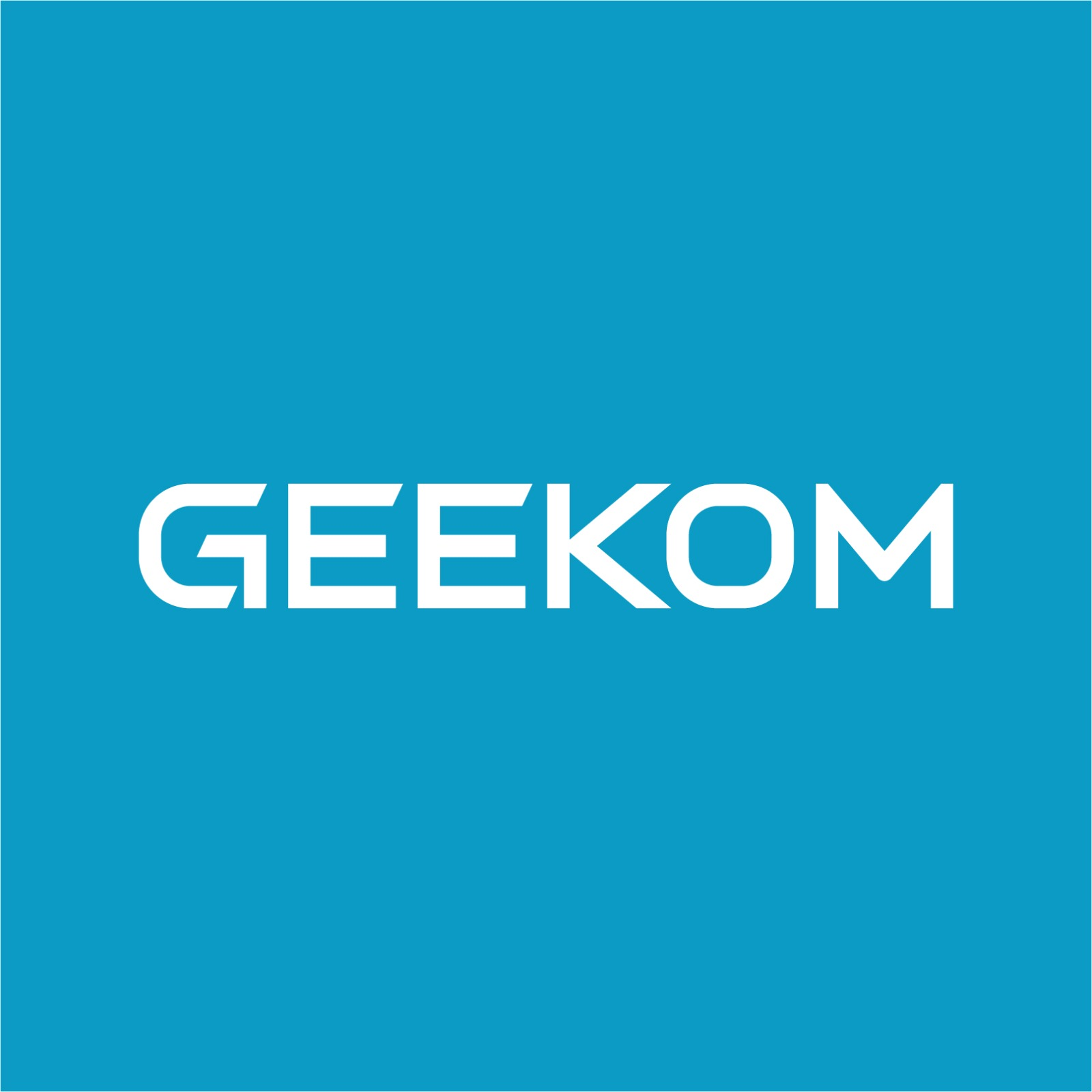
- Logo using since 2026
- Native name: 积核
- Industry: Consumer electronics
- Founded: July 2003; 23 years ago
- Headquarters: Shenzhen, Guangdong, China
- Products: Mini PCs
- Parent: Shenzhen Geekom Electronic Technology Co., Ltd
- Website: www.geekompc.com

GEEKOM is a multinational consumer electronics company specializing in mini PCs. Its research and design headquarters are located in China.

== History ==
GEEKOM was founded in Taiwan in 2003. In late 2021, GEEKOM switched its focus to the Mini PC market and has since become one of the world's leading manufacturers of mini PCs.

== Products ==
GEEKOM specializes in the production and sale of mini PCs. It launched its first flagship mini PC, the Mini IT8, on 20 November 2021. The Mini IT8 has been praised as an "affordable and compact" alternative to NUCs, a similar line of barebone computers product by Intel. As of August 2022, GEEKOM has released the following three mini PCs in addition to the Mini IT8: the Mini IT8 SE, MiniAir 11, and Mini IT11.

The company continued to expand its lineup with the Mini IT13, introduced in late 2023, which reviewers noted for its compact build and performance for professional workloads.

In 2023, the company also launched the GEEKOM A5, a mini PC equipped with AMD Ryzen processors, which was described as a balanced option for everyday computing tasks.

The A6, which received recognition at the 11th Annual European Hardware Awards in 2025, further solidified GEEKOM’s position in the European mini PC market.

In 2024, GEEKOM released the A7, which earned attention in international reviews for combining energy efficiency with strong performance.

In 2024, the company also introduced the A8, marketed as a next-generation AI mini PC powered by an AMD HawkPoint Ryzen 8040 processor.

The GT1 Mega, introduced in 2024, was promoted as one of the first AI-enhanced mini PCs, featuring Intel Core Ultra processors and integrated AI acceleration, and received attention across international markets.

In 2025, GEEKOM unveiled the A9 Max AI PC, equipped with an AMD Ryzen AI 9 HX 370 processor delivering 50 TOPS of AI performance.

Also in 2025, the IT15 mini PC was introduced, featuring Intel Core Ultra processors in a compact chassis, with reviews highlighting its portability, Linux compatibility, and ability to run on power banks.

At the end of 2025, GEEKOM began promoting a line of laptops under the GeekBook name, which officially launched in January 2026. The range included the 16-inch GeekBook X16 Pro, built around an Intel Core Ultra 9 185H processor, and the 14-inch GeekBook X14 Pro, offered with either an Intel Core Ultra 5 125U or Core Ultra 9 185H.

== See also ==
- Beelink
- GMKtec
- Minisforum
