= Sally Project =

Multimedia application framework

- Developer: Christian Knobloch
- Written in: C / C++
- Operating system: Microsoft Windows
- Available in: Multilingual
- Type: Media player
- License: GPL
- Website: www.sally-project.org

Sally Project is a multimedia application framework for Windows based machines, which comes with some already pre-installed applications such as the Media Player and Image Browser. It is a touchscreen-based application framework, which can also be handled easily by mouse. The core functionality is the Media Player which allows the user to play and organize all types of multimedia files.

Sally is an open-source project and the source code can be downloaded from the Sally Project Google Code page.

== UI Design ==
The complete UI is designed to be handled by a single touch touchscreen. Sally does not handle any right mouse clicks. All applications are designed to execute actions by gestures. For example, scrolling in a list view works like on the iPhone by touching the list view and moving the finger up or down.

To render the UI Sally uses hardware acceleration by DirectX 9. That may cause some issues when creating themes for Sally or developing own plugins. Because plugin application are not running in their own process, the complete Sally program can crash by one bad programmed plugins.

== Developer and Designer resources ==
=== SallyAPI ===
With the SallyAPI it's possible to create new applications for Sally using C++ and VisualStudio. The SallyAPI is published under the LGPL licence which provides the developers with the possibility to create closed source applications with this API. That also means, that they can charge money for their work.

Currently the SallyAPI is changing very often, because not all necessary features are implemented yet. Until 1.0 of Sally is reached the SallyAPI can change with any Point release of the software.
