= Table computer =

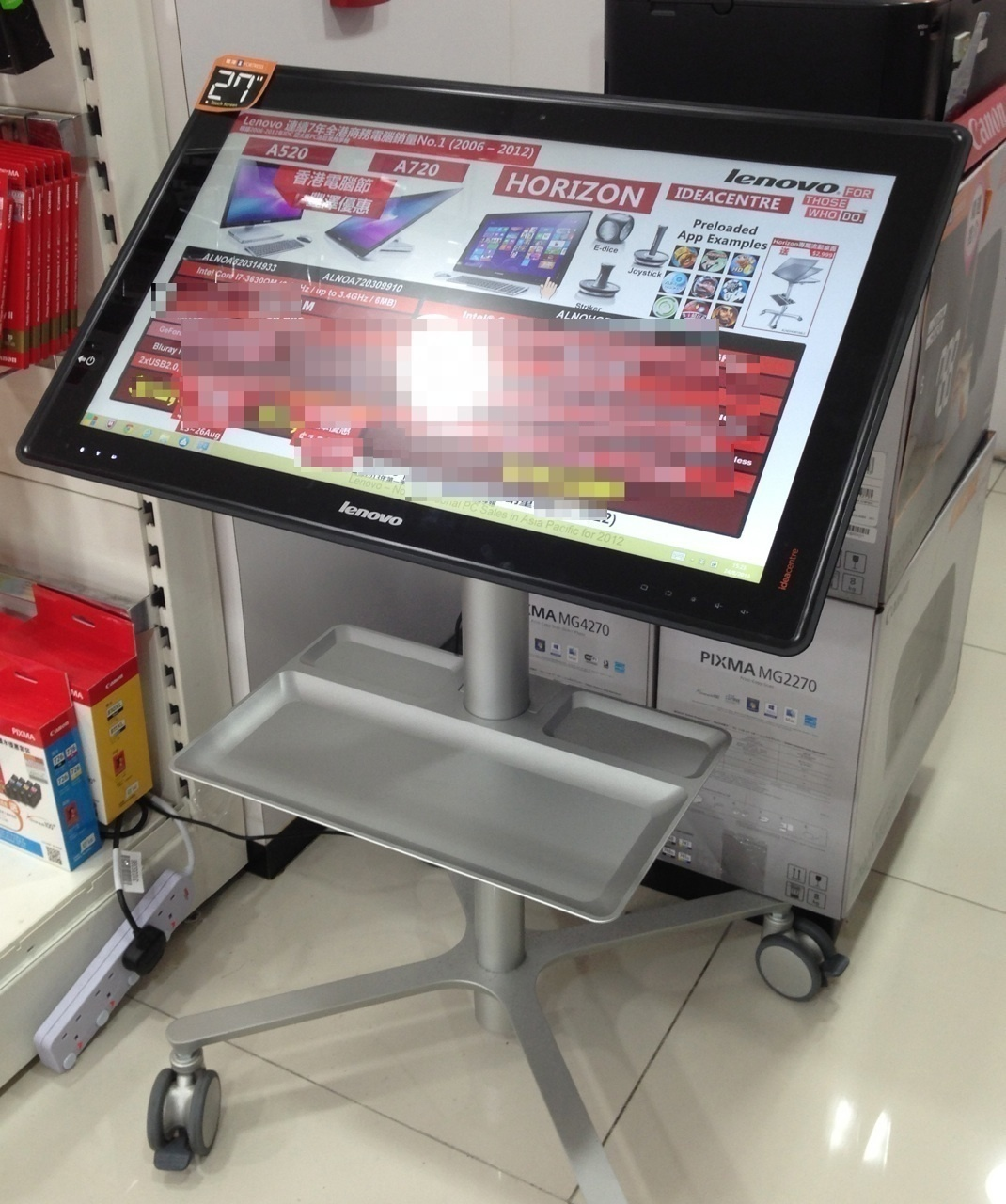
Lenovo IdeaCentre Horizon table PC

A table computer, or a table PC, or a tabletop is a device class of a full-featured large-display portable all-in-one computer with an internal battery. It can either be used on a table's top, hence the name, or carried around the house.

Table computers feature an 18-inch or larger multi-touch touchscreen display, a battery capable of at least two hours of autonomous work and a full-featured desktop operating system, such as Windows 10. They are typically shipped with pre-installed multi-user touch-enabled casual games and apps, and typically marketed as family entertainment devices. Manufacturers of some table computers provide a specialized graphical user interface to simplify a simultaneous interaction of multiple users, one example is Aura interface, which is installed in Lenovo IdeaCentre Horizon tabletop.

A number of manufacturers released their own versions of tabletops, some prominent examples are HP Envy Rove 20, Dell XPS 18 and Sony VAIO Tap 20.

== See also ==
- Surface computer
