= Lenovo 3000 =

Discontinued line of personal computers by Lenovo

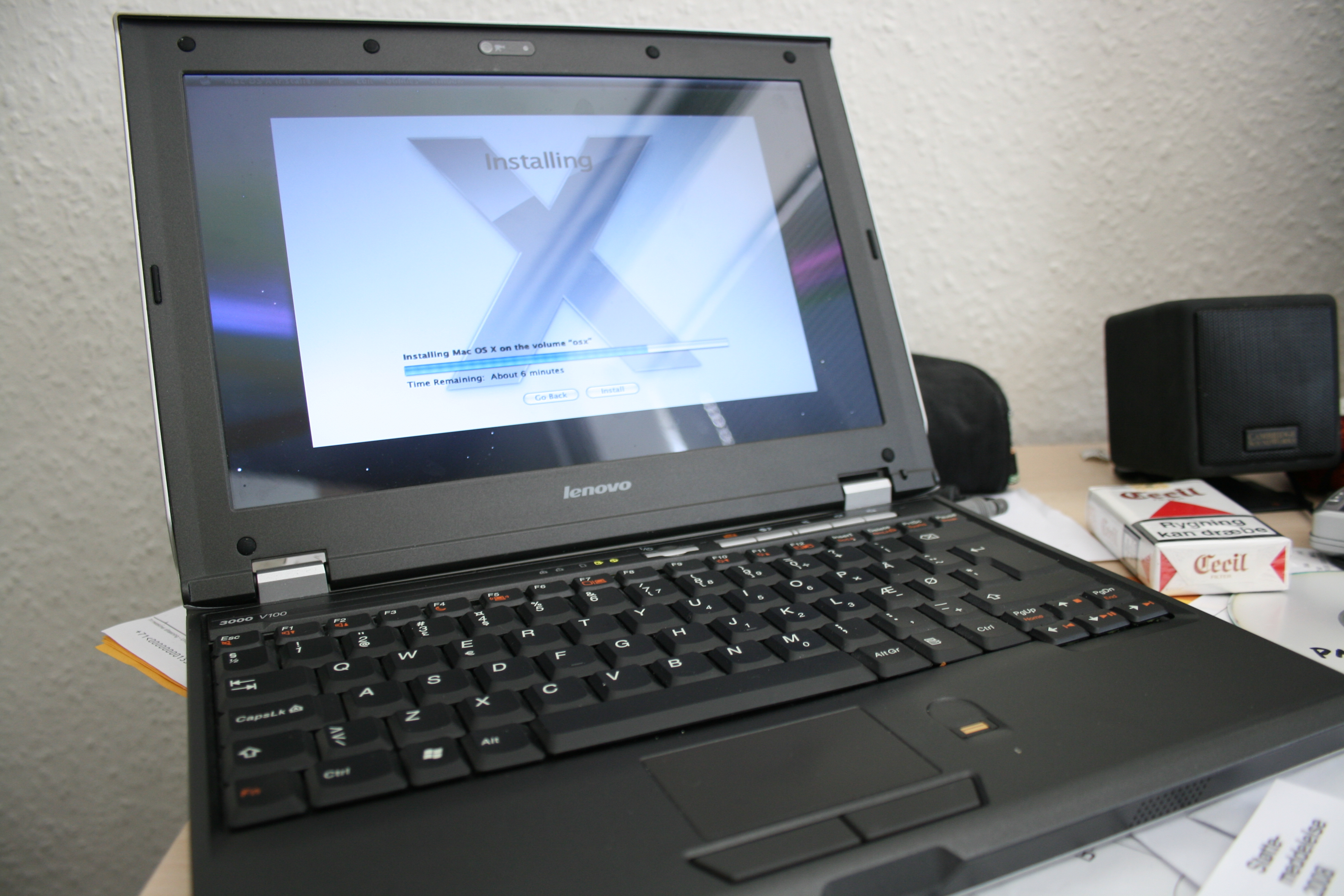
- Lenovo 3000 v100 installing Mac OS X
- Developer: Lenovo
- Type: Laptop, Desktop
- Released: 2006
- Discontinued: 2008
- Operating system: Windows, Linux
- CPU: Intel, AMD
- Successor: IdeaCentre and IdeaPad
- Website: Archived official website at the Wayback Machine (archive index)

Lenovo 3000 is a discontinued line of low-priced notebook and desktop computers designed by Lenovo Group targeting small businesses and individuals. It was replaced with the IdeaCentre and IdeaPad brands.

== Background ==
The Lenovo 3000 series marked the debut of Lenovo branded products outside of China. First showcased in New York City on 23 February 2006, the line was intended to boost Lenovo's competitiveness internationally against rival brands like Dell and Hewlett-Packard. In addition, the 3000 series gave the company an independent identity: an identity separate from the ThinkPad line that Lenovo acquired in 2005 and defined its Westernised image since the acquisition.

In 2008, after introducing two new consumer brands, IdeaPad for laptops and IdeaCentre for desktops, Lenovo stopped selling its 3000 series models, although they continued to be sold in China in 2009.

== Models ==
=== Desktops ===
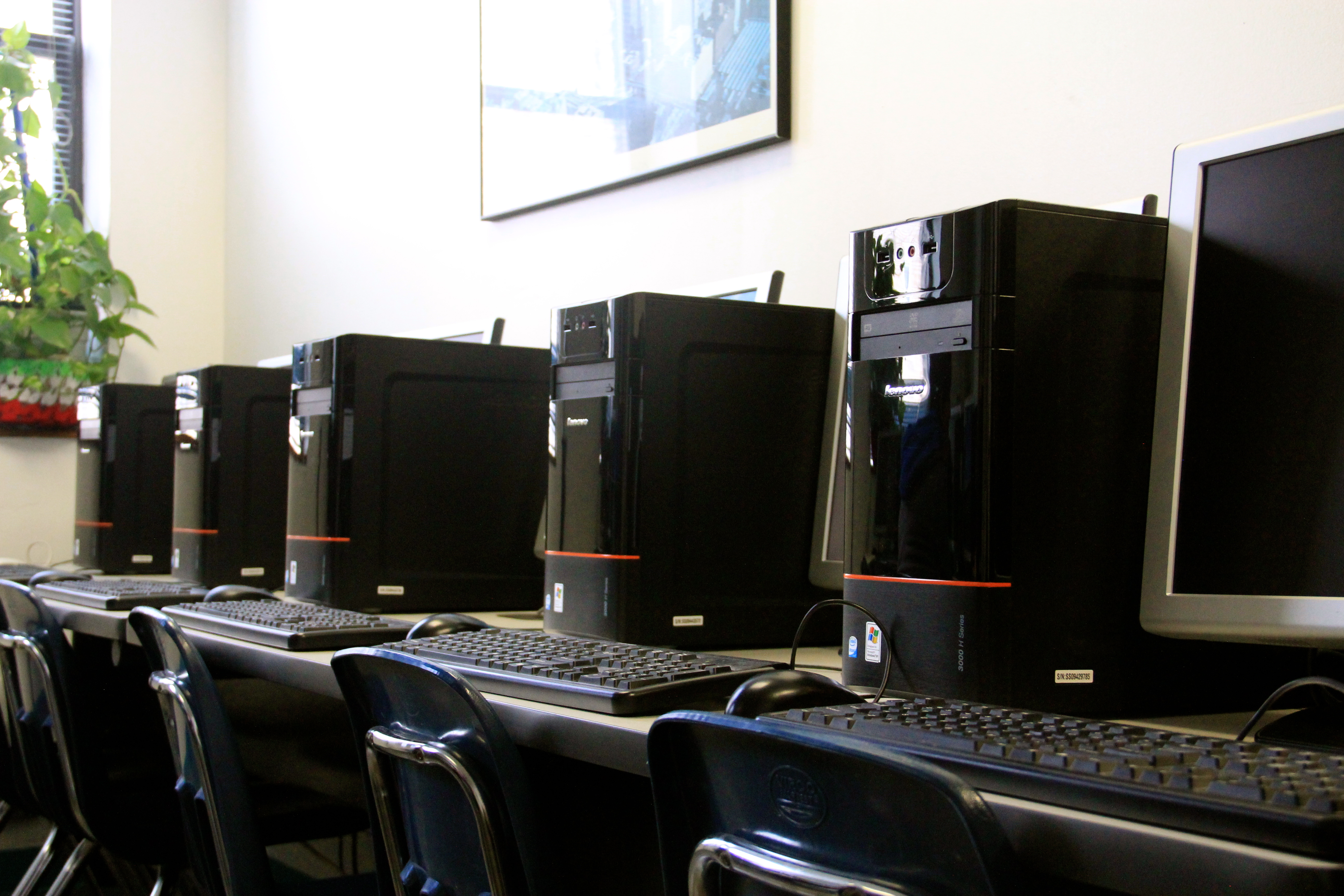
Lenovo 3000 H desktops as public computers

Lenovo 3000 J
features both AMD and Intel processors
Lenovo 3000 H

=== Notebooks ===
First introduced in 2006, the Lenovo 3000 N100 and V100 offered Intel Core Duo processors, while the lower-end C series featured Pentium M and Celeron M processors. Its successors, C200, N200, V200 featured Core 2 Duo processors. Thereafter, came the N500, the G-series, and the B series

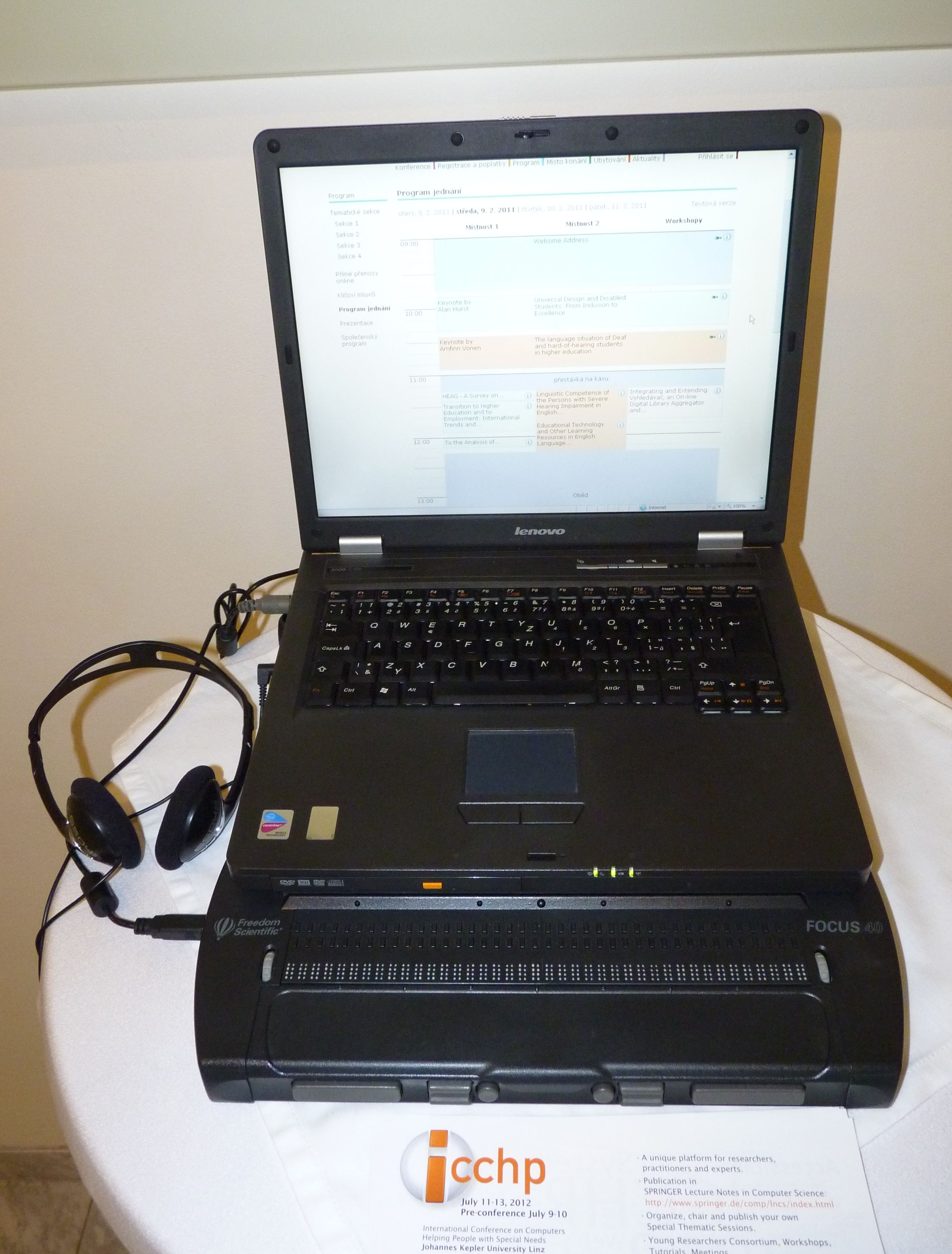
3000 C100 laptop with Braille keyboard

Lenovo 3000 C
C100, C200 - 15-inch XGA screen
Lenovo 3000 N
N100, N200 - 14.1-inch- and 15.4-inch- WXGA models
N500 - 15.4 inch screen.
Lenovo 3000 V
V100, V200 - 12.1-inch WXGA models

Lenovo 3000 G

G400, G410, G430, G450, G455, G510, G530, G550, and G560

Lenovo 3000 B Series

B450-B490 - 15.4 inch screen
