= MT-50 Multitouch Table =

MT-50
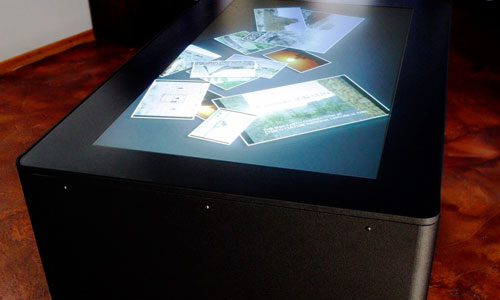
- The MT-50 Multitouch Table
- Manufacturer: Ideum

The MT-50 is an interactive multi-touch table developed by Ideum. The table, now retired, had a 50" display with a 1280 x 720 resolution that used IR flood technology to register multi-user, multitouch gestures, and used the NUI Snowflake software package to handle optical processing. It supported over 50 discrete touch points. The casing was built with aircraft-grade aluminum and tempered glass to allow it to stand heavy use in public environments.

The MT-50 was replaced by the Ideum's next generation of multitouch tables, the 55" Platform and Pro tables.
