= Media center =

Media center or media centre may refer to:

== Audio-visual software and devices ==
- Entertainment center, furniture housing electronics for media consumption
- Home cinema, also commonly referred to as a dedicated "home theater" or "home media room"
- Home theater PC, media computer designed for living-room or home cinema use
- Media center application, multimedia software for large screens controlled by remotes
  - Kodi (software), open-source media center application, cross-platform software formerly named XBMC and originally named Xbox Media Center
  - JRiver Media Center, a paid versatile multimedia application for Windows computers
  - Windows Media Center, a discontinued Microsoft PC media center application
- Portable Media Center
- Sally Project, open-source software, designed for touchscreen Windows machines
- Western Digital Media Center

== Journalism ==
- International Broadcast Centre at a major sports event such as the Olympic Games
- Independent Media Center or Indymedia
- Women's Media Center
- Women Media Center
- International Middle East Media Center
- San Francisco Bay Area Independent Media Center
- China Media Center

== Librarianship ==
- Hybrid library, an area storing audio or visual material rather than books
- School media center
- Civic Media Center
- Keio Media Centers (Libraries)

== See also ==
- Media (disambiguation)
