= Chuwi (company) =

Chinese electronics manufacturer

Chuwi Innovation Technology Co., Ltd.
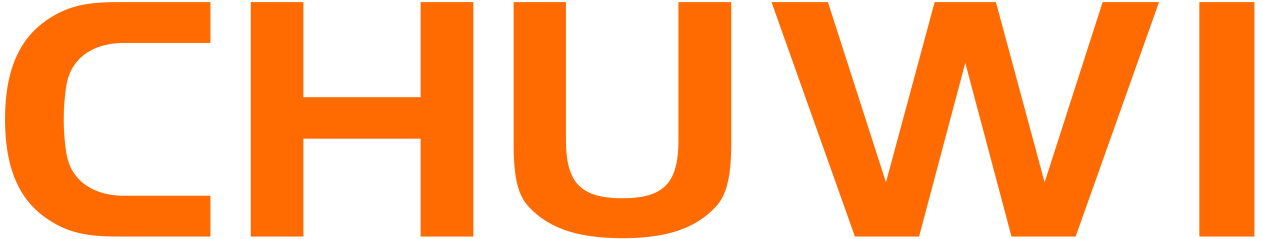
- Native name: 驰为创新科技（深圳）有限公司
- Type: Private Limited company
- Industry: Electronics
- Headquarters: Shenzhen, Longhua District, China
- Area served: Worldwide
- Products: Laptops; Tablet computers; Mini PCs; Mobile phones; Power banks; Microphones; Smart audiovisual equipment; Digital players; Sweepers
- Website: www.chuwi.com

Chuwi (officially Chuwi Innovation Technology Co., Ltd.) is a Chinese consumer electronics company founded in Shenzhen, China, in September 2004. The company's main product categories include laptops, tablet computers, and mini PCs. According to the company, it employs more than 150 people, partners with three manufacturing facilities, and has served more than 100 million users worldwide.

Chuwi

Chinese name
- Traditional Chinese: 馳為創新科技（深圳）有限公司
- Simplified Chinese: 驰为创新科技（深圳）有限公司
- Hanyu Pinyin: Chíwéi Chuàngxīn Kējì (Shēnzhèn) Yǒuxiàn Gōngsī
Transcriptions
Standard Mandarin
- Hanyu Pinyin: Chíwéi Chuàngxīn Kējì (Shēnzhèn) Yǒuxiàn Gōngsī
- Wade–Giles: Ch'ih-wei Ch'uang-hsin K'e-chi (Shen-chen) Yu-hsien Kung-ssu
- Tongyong Pinyin: Chíwéi Chuàngsīn Kējì (Shēnzhèn) Yǒuxiàn Gōngsī
- IPA: Chíwéi Chuàngxīn Kējì (Shēnzhèn) Yǒuxiàn Gōngsī
Southern Min
- Hokkien POJ: Chî-ûi Chhòng-sin Kho-ki (Sim-chìn) Iú-hān Kong-si
Middle Chinese
- Middle Chinese: Ch'i-wei Ch'uang-hsin K'o-chi (Shen-chen) Yu-hsien Kung-ssu

Zhuang name
- Zhuang: Cizveiz Cangsinh Gohyih (Sin Cinj) Youxen Gunghswh

Japanese name
- Kana: チーウェイチュァンシンカージ(シェン ジェン)ヨウシェンゴンスー

Chuwi Innovation Technology Co., Ltd. (馳為創新科技（深圳）有限公司) is an electronics manufacturer headquartered in Shenzhen, China.

The CHUWI UniBox AI495 Pro workstation, equipped with an AMD Ryzen AI MAX+ PRO 495 processor and up to 192 GB of unified memory, received a MUSE Design Award for its design.

== Business model and operations ==
According to the company, Chuwi operates through three primary business models:

- B2B (Business-to-business): Manufacturing and marketing products for distributors, resellers, and enterprise customers.
- B2C (Business-to-consumer): Selling products directly to end users through e-commerce platforms.
- OEM (Original equipment manufacturer): Manufacturing hardware, peripherals, and components for third-party brands and organizations.

== Financial data and revenue distribution ==
According to the company, Chuwi's annual revenue exceeded US$100 million in 2019 and reached US$497 million within the following two years.

According to the company, tablets accounted for 71% of its revenue, followed by laptops at 21% and mini PCs at 8%.

== Laptops ==
=== UniBook ===
The UniBook is a laptop introduced by Chuwi in 2026. It is powered by Intel's Core 3 304 processor based on the Wildcat Lake architecture and features a 14-inch 1920 × 1200 IPS display with 100% sRGB color coverage, 8 GB LPDDR5 memory, a 256 GB PCIe SSD, and Windows 11 Pro.

The laptop includes two full-featured USB-C ports, three USB-A ports, HDMI, Gigabit Ethernet, a TF card slot, Wi-Fi 6, Bluetooth 5.2, and supports PCIe 4.0 SSD upgrades through its M.2 expansion slot.

Technology publications including TechPowerUp, Wccftech, and Gizmochina described the UniBook as one of the first laptops based on Intel's Wildcat Lake platform. The publications highlighted its US$449 launch price, battery life, connectivity, and positioning as a Windows alternative to Apple's MacBook Neo.

=== GTBook X ===
In August 2026, Chuwi introduced the GTBook X (also branded as GTBook X Laptop GamingBook), a budget-focused gaming laptop. The laptop is powered by an Intel Core 7 230H processor (10 cores, 16 threads, up to 5.2 GHz) paired with an Nvidia GeForce RTX 3050 Laptop GPU running at an 80 W base TGP (up to 95 W via Dynamic Boost, with a combined system power target of 140 W).

The GTBook X features a 15.6-inch Full HD (1920 × 1080) IPS display with a 144 Hz refresh rate. Storage and memory options include two SO-DIMM DDR5 slots supporting up to 64 GB of RAM and dual M.2 2280 PCIe 4.0 slots supporting up to 2 TB SSD storage. Connectivity features include HDMI 2.1, Mini DisplayPort, USB-C 3.2, Gigabit Ethernet, an SD card reader, Wi-Fi 6, and Bluetooth 5.2.

=== GameBook Max ===
In October 2026, Chuwi announced the GameBook Max, an 18-inch gaming laptop powered by Intel 14th-generation Core HX processors. The system is offered in two CPU configurations: an Intel Core i7-14650HX or a Core i9-14900HX, both paired with an Nvidia GeForce RTX 5060 Laptop GPU with 8 GB of GDDR7 VRAM and a maximum graphics power (TGP) rating of 115 W with Dynamic Boost.

The laptop features an 18-inch WUXGA (1920 × 1200) IPS display with a 16:10 aspect ratio and a 144 Hz refresh rate. Memory configurations include 16 GB or 32 GB of DDR5 RAM (expandable to 64 GB via two SO-DIMM slots), while storage choices consist of 512 GB or 1 TB PCIe SSDs, supported by two M.2 2280 PCIe 4.0 slots. Additional hardware specifications include a 77.77 Wh battery, a 250 W AC adapter with support for up to 140 W USB-C Power Delivery, 2.5 Gb Ethernet, Wi-Fi 6E, Bluetooth 5.2, HDMI 2.1, and Mini DisplayPort 2.1a.

=== NeoBook Plus ===
In September 2026, Chuwi introduced the NeoBook Plus, a 15.6-inch laptop powered by an Intel Core 3 100U Raptor Lake-U processor. The laptop features a 15.6-inch Full HD (1920 × 1080) IPS display with a 16:9 aspect ratio and a 60 Hz refresh rate.

The base configuration includes 16 GB of RAM and a 512 GB SSD. Memory and storage are expandable via two SO-DIMM slots and two M.2 2280 slots. Physical dimensions are 357.2 × 228.3 × 17.4 mm with a weight of approximately 1.5 kg, incorporating a full-sized keyboard with a numeric keypad and a 57 Wh battery supporting 65 W USB-C Power Delivery.

Connectivity options comprise two USB-C ports (supporting PD charging and 4K at 60 Hz video output), three USB-A ports, an HDMI port, a 1 Gbps Ethernet port, a microSD card reader, a 3.5 mm audio jack, Wi-Fi 6, and Bluetooth 5.2, as well as a 720p webcam with a physical privacy shutter.

=== NeoBook ===
In September 2026, Chuwi introduced the NeoBook, a 14-inch thin-and-light laptop powered by an Intel Core 3 100U processor. The laptop features a 14-inch WUXGA (1920 × 1200) IPS display with a 16:10 aspect ratio, a 60 Hz refresh rate, a peak brightness of 300 nits, and a 180-degree hinge.

Configuration options include 8 GB of RAM with a 256 GB SATA SSD or 16 GB of RAM with a 512 GB PCIe Gen3 SSD. Unlike many thin-and-light devices, the memory and storage are user-upgradeable via two SO-DIMM DDR4 slots and two M.2 2280 slots.

The device weighs approximately 1.2 kg and measures 16.4 mm in thickness, powered by a 53.38 Wh battery that supports 65 W USB-C charging. Connectivity options consist of two USB 3.2 Gen 1 Type-C ports (supporting data, power delivery, and 4K 60 Hz video output), three USB-A ports (two USB 3.2 Gen 1 and one USB 2.0), an HDMI 1.4 port, Gigabit Ethernet, a microSD card reader, a 3.5 mm audio jack, and a 720p webcam with a privacy shutter.

=== MiniBook X (2022) ===
In early 2022, Chuwi introduced the MiniBook X, a 10.8-inch convertible (2-in-1) laptop. The device features a 360-degree hinge allowing it to function in both laptop and tablet modes, and features an aluminum top casing paired with a plastic bottom chassis.

The laptop is equipped with a 10.8-inch 2K LCD display featuring a punch-hole cutout for the front-facing camera and touchscreen support with stylus compatibility. Under the hood, it is powered by an Intel Celeron N5100 processor, paired with 12 GB of LPDDR4x RAM and 512 GB of non-expandable SSD storage.

The device measures 13 mm in thickness, weighs approximately 1.9 lbs (0.86 kg), and contains a 3,800 mAh battery. External I/O includes two USB-C ports and a 3.5 mm audio jack. Reviews in technology publications such as Forbes highlighted the device's keyboard layout and compact form factor for productivity tasks, while noting limits in battery life, tablet ergonomics, and graphics performance.

=== CoreBook Air 226V ===
In July 2026, Chuwi introduced the CoreBook Air, a 14-inch thin-and-light laptop powered by an Intel Core Ultra 5 226V "Lunar Lake" processor featuring an integrated Intel Arc 130V GPU and an Intel AI Boost NPU delivering up to 40 TOPS. The laptop features an anodized aluminum chassis measuring 9 mm at its thinnest point and weighing approximately 1.2 kg.

The device includes a 14-inch 2.8K (2880 × 1800) IPS display with a 16:10 aspect ratio and a 120 Hz refresh rate. Hardware specifications feature 16 GB of non-upgradable LPDDR5X RAM on-package and a 512 GB PCIe 3.0 NVMe SSD (with an M.2 slot supporting PCIe 4.0 expansion).

Connectivity and physical features consist of two Thunderbolt 4 ports (supporting eGPU and 65 W USB-C Power Delivery), three USB-A ports, a full-sized HDMI 2.0 port, a 3.5 mm audio jack, Wi-Fi 6E, Bluetooth 5.3, a 2 MP webcam with a physical privacy shutter and a hardware camera/microphone kill switch, and a 55 Wh battery.

=== CoreBook Air Plus ===
In February 2026, Chuwi launched the CoreBook Air Plus 16, a 16-inch mid-range laptop powered by an AMD Ryzen 5 6600H processor with integrated AMD Radeon 660M graphics. The device comes pre-installed with Windows 11 Pro and includes an activated license for Microsoft Office Professional Plus 2024.

Hardware configurations feature 16 GB of soldered LPDDR5-6400 memory and a 512 GB NVMe SSD. Display outputs support multi-monitor setups with up to four independent displays using the built-in screen, HDMI port, and two full-featured USB-C ports with DisplayPort Alt Mode. Additional physical I/O includes one USB 3.2 Gen 1 Type-A port, one USB 2.0 port, a 3.5 mm audio jack, Wi-Fi 6 (Realtek RTL8852BE), Bluetooth 5.4, and a webcam with a hardware privacy shutter.

=== CoreBook Air (AMD) ===
In February 2026, Chuwi introduced an AMD-powered variant of the CoreBook Air, featuring an AMD Ryzen 5 6600H processor (6 cores, 12 threads, up to 4.5 GHz) with integrated AMD Radeon 660M graphics. The laptop is built with an aluminum alloy chassis measuring 298.4 × 221.3 × 16.3 mm and weighing approximately 1.08 kg.

The device features a 14-inch WUXGA (1920 × 1200) IPS display with a 16:10 aspect ratio and 315 nits of brightness. Hardware specifications include 16 GB of non-upgradable LPDDR5 6400MHz RAM and 512 GB of PCIe 3.0 NVMe SSD storage.

Physical ports and connectivity include two full-featured USB 3.2 Gen 2 Type-C ports, one data-only USB Type-C port, one USB 3.2 Gen 1 Type-A port, a full-sized HDMI 2.1 TMDS port, a 3.5 mm audio jack, Wi-Fi, Bluetooth, a 2 MP webcam with a mechanical privacy shutter, and a 55 Wh battery with 65 W USB-C Power Delivery support.

=== GameBook 9955HX ===
In August 2025, Chuwi introduced the GameBook 9955HX, a 16-inch high-performance laptop powered by an AMD Ryzen 9 9955HX processor (16 cores, 32 threads, up to 5.4 GHz) paired with an Nvidia GeForce RTX 5070 Ti Laptop GPU (12 GB GDDR7 VRAM, 140 W TGP). The laptop features an aluminum display lid with a high-impact plastic body, measuring 356.7 × 253.8 × 21.4 mm and weighing 2.3 kg.

The device includes a 16-inch 2.5K (2560 × 1600) IPS display with a 16:10 aspect ratio, 300 Hz refresh rate, and peak brightness of 500 nits. Memory and storage configurations comprise 32 GB of dual-channel DDR5 5600MHz RAM (expandable to 64 GB via two SO-DIMM slots) and a 1 TB PCIe 4.0 NVMe SSD, supported by two M.2 2280 slots (one PCIe 5.0 and one PCIe 4.0).

Physical I/O includes two USB 3.2 Gen 2 Type-C ports (supporting up to 100 W/140 W Power Delivery charging when powered off), three USB 3.2 Gen 1 Type-A ports, an HDMI 2.1 port (supporting 4K at 120 Hz), a Mini DisplayPort 2.1a (UHBR20 80 Gbps), a 2.5G RJ45 Ethernet port, a 3.5 mm audio jack, a Kensington lock slot, and a 1080p IR webcam supporting Windows Hello with a physical privacy cover. The laptop is equipped with a 77.77 Wh battery, Wi-Fi 6E, Bluetooth 5.2, and a physical "Turbo" button to toggle hardware power profiles.

=== CoreBook X (2022) ===
In March 2022, Chuwi announced a refreshed version of the CoreBook X 14-inch laptop. The laptop is powered by an Intel Core i3-10110U Comet Lake-U processor with integrated Intel UHD Graphics 620.

The device features a 14-inch 2160 × 1440 IPS display with a 3:2 aspect ratio covering 100% of the sRGB color space. Standard hardware specifications include 8 GB of DDR4-2666 RAM and a 512 GB SSD.

Weighing approximately 1.36 kg, the laptop is equipped with a 46.2 Wh battery, an Intel AX201 Wi-Fi modem, USB Type-A and Type-C ports, and a microSD card reader.

== Tablets ==
=== Hi10 Max ===
In June 2024, Chuwi launched the Hi10 Max, a 12.96-inch 2-in-1 Windows 11 tablet. The device is powered by an Intel N100 quad-core processor (up to 3.4 GHz boost) and features a metal unibody design measuring 9 mm in thickness and weighing 775 grams.

The tablet is equipped with a 12.96-inch 3K (2880 × 1920) IPS display protected by Corning Gorilla Glass, featuring a 3:2 aspect ratio and peak brightness of 300 nits. Internal specifications include 12 GB of LPDDR5-4800 RAM and a 512 GB SSD.

Physical connectivity includes two USB-C ports, one USB 3.2 Gen 1 Type-A port, a Micro HDMI port, and a 3.5 mm audio jack, alongside Wi-Fi 6 and Bluetooth 5.2. The Hi10 Max includes an 8 MP autofocus rear camera, a 5 MP front camera, a 36.48 Wh battery, and support for an optional magnetic keyboard folio and the HiPen stylus (4,096 pressure levels).

== Mini PCs ==

=== AuBox 8745HS ===
The AuBox 8745HS is a mini PC introduced by Chuwi in 2025. It is powered by the AMD Ryzen 7 8745HS processor with 8 cores and 16 threads, paired with integrated Radeon 780M graphics based on the RDNA 3 architecture.

The system supports up to 64 GB DDR5-5600 memory, dual M.2 PCIe 4.0 SSD slots, USB4, OCuLink for external GPU connectivity, dual 2.5 Gigabit Ethernet ports, Wi-Fi 6, Bluetooth 5.3, and simultaneous output to up to four 4K displays. It is shipped with Windows 11 Pro.

In a review published by Tao of Mac, the AuBox 8745HS was praised for its aluminum chassis, upgrade-friendly internal design, dual NVMe storage slots, dual 2.5 Gigabit Ethernet ports, and overall performance, while the reviewer noted that the single-channel memory configuration of the reviewed unit limited integrated graphics performance.

=== AuBox X ===
The CHUWI AuBox X is a compact mini PC powered by Intel Core Ultra Series 2 processors based on the Lunar Lake architecture. The Ultra 5 226V configuration features integrated Intel Arc 130V graphics and a dedicated Intel AI Boost neural processing unit (NPU). According to published specifications, the system delivers up to 97 TOPS of combined AI performance and supports USB4 connectivity, Wi-Fi 6E, Bluetooth 5.3 and up to three displays. The device has a volume of approximately 0.67 litres and comes with Windows 11 Pro.

=== AuBox X 256V ===
The AuBox X 256V is a mini PC introduced by Chuwi in 2026. It is powered by Intel's Core Ultra 7 256V processor based on the Lunar Lake architecture and features Intel Arc 140V integrated graphics, 16 GB LPDDR5X memory, a 1 TB PCIe 4.0 SSD, dual M.2 slots with PCIe 5.0 expansion support, USB4 connectivity, dual HDMI outputs, 2.5 Gigabit Ethernet, Wi-Fi 6E, Bluetooth 5.4, and Windows 11 Pro.

TechRadar described the AuBox X 256V as a compact mini PC with a premium metal chassis, strong productivity performance, USB4 connectivity, dual M.2 storage slots, and a combined AI performance of 115 TOPS. The review also identified the non-upgradable 16 GB memory, noticeable fan noise under sustained workloads, and pricing as the product's primary limitations.

Wccftech identified the AuBox X as one of the first mini PCs built around Intel's Lunar Lake platform and highlighted its AI capabilities, modern connectivity, and positioning for productivity, multimedia, and light gaming workloads.

=== LarkBox X 100U ===
In July 2026, Chuwi released the LarkBox X 100U, a compact mini PC served as a refresh to the 2023 N100-powered model. The desktop system is powered by an Intel Core 3 100U Raptor Lake Refresh processor paired with an integrated 64EU Intel UHD Graphics iGPU.

Base hardware specifications include 16 GB of RAM and a 512 GB SSD, with both memory and storage being user-upgradeable. The system supports triple 4K display output via a full-featured USB Type-C port (with DisplayPort Alt Mode), a DisplayPort 1.2, and an HDMI 2.1 port.

Additional physical I/O and networking feature four USB 3.2 Gen 2 Type-A ports, dual Gigabit Ethernet ports, Wi-Fi 6, and Bluetooth 5.2 connectivity.

=== AUBOX AI 365 ===
In November 2025, Chuwi officially revealed the AUBOX AI 365, a compact mini PC powered by an AMD Ryzen AI 9 365 processor (10 cores, 20 threads, up to 5.0 GHz) paired with an integrated AMD Radeon 880M GPU. The processor features an integrated NPU delivering up to 50 TOPS, with total system AI performance reaching up to 73 TOPS.

The system ships with Windows 11 Pro, 32 GB of DDR5 RAM (expandable up to 96 GB), and a 1 TB PCIe 4.0 SSD with expansion slots for additional storage drives. The chassis measures 140 × 139 × 55 mm, weighs approximately 846 grams, and is powered by a 120 W power adapter.

Connectivity features include two USB4 ports, three USB 3.2 Gen 2 Type-A ports, two 2.5G Ethernet ports, an HDMI 2.1 port, a DisplayPort 1.4, and a 3.5 mm audio jack. It supports up to four simultaneous display outputs (including 8K at 60 Hz and 4K at 144 Hz) along with Wi-Fi 6 and Bluetooth 5.3.

=== UBox ===
In March 2025, Chuwi introduced the UBox, a compact mini PC powered by an AMD Ryzen 5 6600H processor with integrated AMD Radeon 660M graphics. The device features a detachable white plastic chassis measuring 130 × 130 × 55 mm, weighs 280 grams, and supports VESA mounting.

The system runs Windows 11 Pro 64-bit and ships with 16 GB of DDR5 RAM (expandable via a secondary slot) and a 512 GB SSD, with an additional expansion slot for storage.

I/O connectivity includes a 40 Gbps USB4 port, three USB 3.2 ports, one USB 2.0 port, an HDMI 2.0 port, a DisplayPort 1.4, dual 2.5G Ethernet ports, and a 3.5 mm audio jack. The UBox supports up to three simultaneous 4K displays at 120 Hz, alongside Wi-Fi 6E and Bluetooth 5.2 via a Realtek 8852BE module.

== All-in-one PCs ==
=== Unitech 24 ===
Chuwi launched the Unitech 24, a 23.8-inch All-in-One (AIO) desktop computer running Windows 11 Pro. The system is powered by an AMD Ryzen 5 processor (6 cores, 12 threads, up to 4.5 GHz, 45 W TDP) paired with integrated AMD Radeon 660M graphics.

The computer features a 23.8-inch Full HD (1920 × 1080) IPS display with a 120 Hz refresh rate, a 16:9 aspect ratio, 250 nits of brightness, and 99% sRGB color gamut coverage. Standard hardware specifications include 16 GB of LPDDR5-6400 RAM and a 512 GB PCIe SSD (expandable up to 1 TB via an M.2 2280 PCIe 4.0×4 slot).

Physical dimensions measure 539.6 × 320.2 × 57.7 mm, with a weight of approximately 4.15 kg, powered by a 120 W power adapter. I/O connectivity consists of two USB 3.2 Gen 1 Type-A ports, four USB 2.0 Type-A ports, an HDMI 1.4 port, a DisplayPort 1.4, a 1Gb Ethernet port, separate 3.5 mm microphone and headphone jacks, a 5 MP pop-up camera with dual microphones, and dual 3 W stereo speakers. The system supports up to two external displays simultaneously and includes Wi-Fi 6 and Bluetooth 5.2 connectivity.

=== Unitech 27 ===
Chuwi released the Unitech 27, a 27-inch All-in-One (AIO) desktop computer running Windows 11 Pro. The system is powered by an AMD Ryzen 5 6600H processor (6 cores, 12 threads, up to 4.5 GHz) paired with integrated AMD Radeon 660M graphics.

The computer features a 27-inch 2K (2560 × 1440) IPS display with a 120 Hz refresh rate and a 16:9 aspect ratio. Standard hardware specifications include 16 GB of soldered RAM and a 512 GB PCIe SSD with an expandable M.2 2280 PCIe slot.

Physical dimensions measure 613.8 × 571.1 × 19.4 mm with a weight of approximately 7.7 kg, and the system comes equipped with a height-adjustable stand and a 120 W power adapter. I/O connectivity consists of one USB 3.2 Gen 1 Type-C port, three USB 3.2 Gen 1 Type-A ports, two USB 2.0 Type-A ports, an HDMI 1.4 port, a DisplayPort 1.4, a 1Gb Ethernet port, separate 3.5 mm microphone and headphone jacks, a 5 MP pop-up camera with dual microphones, and dual 3 W stereo speakers. The system supports up to two external displays simultaneously and includes Wi-Fi 6 and Bluetooth 5.2 connectivity.

=== Unitech 24 100U ===
Chuwi introduced the Unitech 24 100U, an Intel-powered variant of its 23.8-inch All-in-One (AIO) desktop computer running Windows 11 Pro. The system is powered by an Intel Core 3 100U processor (6 cores, 8 threads, up to 4.7 GHz) with integrated Intel Graphics.

The computer features a 23.8-inch Full HD (1920 × 1080) IPS display with a 120 Hz refresh rate and a 16:9 aspect ratio. Base hardware configurations offer up to 16 GB of DDR4/DDR5 RAM via dual-channel SO-DIMM slots (expandable up to 64 GB) and up to a 512 GB PCIe SSD (expandable up to 1 TB via an M.2 2280 PCIe 4.0×4 slot).

Physical dimensions measure 539.6 × 320.2 × 57.7 mm, with a weight of approximately 4.15 kg, powered by a 90 W power adapter. I/O connectivity includes two USB 3.2 Gen 1 Type-A ports, four USB 2.0 Type-A ports, an HDMI 1.4 port, a DisplayPort 1.4, a 1Gb Ethernet port, separate 3.5 mm microphone and headphone jacks, a 5 MP pop-up camera with dual microphones, and dual 3 W stereo speakers. The system supports up to two external displays simultaneously and includes Wi-Fi 6 and Bluetooth 5.2 connectivity.

=== E10 ETBox ===
In July 2024, Chuwi, in collaboration with Acer Gadget, announced the E10 ETBox, a compact 2-liter desktop mini PC measuring 178 × 188 × 62 mm with an aluminum alloy chassis. The system is powered by an Intel Core i5-12450H processor (8 cores, 12 threads, 45 W TDP) featuring active cooling with finned heat dissipation.

Memory and storage configurations support up to 64 GB of DDR5-4800 RAM via dual SO-DIMM slots alongside dual M.2 2280 storage slots (one PCIe 3.0 x4 and one PCIe 3.0 x2).

Physical connectivity includes a Thunderbolt 4 (USB Type-C) port, four USB 3.2 Gen 1 Type-A ports, a USB 2.0 Type-A port, two HDMI 1.4 ports, a DisplayPort 1.2, a 2.5 GbE Ethernet port, a Gigabit Ethernet port, separate 3.5 mm microphone and headphone jacks, and a DC power input. Wireless connectivity is provided via Wi-Fi 6 and Bluetooth 5.2.

=== e10 Series (Acer Gadget Partnership) ===
In 2023, Chuwi entered into a brand licensing partnership with Acer Gadget Inc., a subsidiary of the Acer Group, securing licensing rights to the "e10" brand to launch a co-branded product line consisting of mini PCs, laptops, and 2-in-1 tablets.

==== Mini PCs ====
- E10 ETBox – A 2-liter mini PC powered by an Intel Core i5-12450H processor with active cooling, featuring Thunderbolt 4, dual HDMI 1.4, DisplayPort 1.2, dual Ethernet (2.5 GbE + 1 GbE), and support for up to 64 GB of DDR5 RAM.
- ETBox AI P09H – A mini PC powered by an Intel Core Ultra 7 processor with integrated AI acceleration, featuring 16 GB of RAM and 1 TB of storage.
- ERBox1 7735HS – A mini PC powered by an AMD Ryzen 7 7735HS processor, featuring 16 GB of RAM and a 512 GB SSD.
- ETBox i7-13620H – A mini PC powered by an Intel Core i7-13620H processor with 4K output support.
- ETBox X – An entry-level mini PC powered by an Intel Core i3 processor, featuring 16 GB of RAM and a 512 GB SSD.

==== Laptops ====
- ETBook – A 14-inch laptop featuring a 2K resolution display, powered by an Intel Core i5-12450H processor with 16 GB of RAM and a 512 GB SSD.
- ERBook Max – A 16-inch laptop powered by an AMD Ryzen 7 processor, equipped with a 74.1 Wh battery, 16 GB of RAM, and a 512 GB SSD.
- ETBook M14P – A fanless 14-inch lightweight laptop weighing 1.3 kg, configured with 8 GB of RAM and 256 GB of SSD storage.
- ETBook Plus – A 15.6-inch laptop powered by an Intel N100 processor, featuring 8 GB of RAM and 256 GB of SSD storage.
- ETBook SE – A 14.1-inch thin and lightweight laptop configured with 8 GB of RAM and 256 GB of SSD storage.

==== Tablets ====
- ETPad Max – A 12.96-inch 2-in-1 tablet featuring a 3K resolution display, powered by an Intel Core i3 processor with 16 GB of RAM and a 512 GB SSD.
