= Ideum =

- Company type: Multitouch products and digital interactives
- Headquarters: Corrales, New Mexico, United States
- Website: www.ideum.com

Ideum is a company based in Corrales, New Mexico, United States that produces multitouch tables and walls, custom interactive exhibits, and custom hardware. The company was founded in 1999 by Jim Spadaccini, who created interactive exhibits for San Francisco's Exploratorium before becoming creative director at Ideum. With strong ties to the museum and informal science education fields, many of the company's products and services are targeted at museums and other public spaces. In 2015 and 2016, the company was listed on the Inc. 5000, list of the Fastest Growing Companies in the US. In 2017 and again in 2018, the company was honored as one of the "Best Entrepreneurial Companies in America" by Entrepreneur Magazine.

The firm has a focus on developing interactive exhibits that combine custom software, large scale hardware such as multitouch tables, and more recently new technology like fiducial markers and motion recognition. Ideum has also developed interactive video walls and has created state-of-the-art installations using projection mapping.

Ideum's first product, MT-50 multitouch table garnered recognition for its high resolution and large surface. In 2011 and 2012, the company expanded its line to include three 55" multitouch tables, the Platform, Pro, and Pro Lab; two 46" tables, the Platform 46 full-sized and coffee tables; the Platform 32 coffee table; the 100" Pano table; and the 65" Presenter and Presenter 55 touch walls. Ideum has continued to update and expand this line. The company was first to offer many of these touch tables with 4K and with 3M touch technology.

These multitouch displays support Ideum's proprietary software development framework, GestureWorks which is written in C++. The free Open Exhibits SDK allows for the development of multitouch multiuser applications in ActionScript and more recently in partnership with Omeka, development has begun in C++. Directed by Ideum, the Open Exhibits initiative was sponsored by the National Science Foundation.

Ideum has designed exhibits for the Smithsonian Cooper Hewitt Design Museum, NASA, the Adventure Science Center in Nashville, California Science Center, Monterey Bay Aquarium, Miami Science Museum, and the National Park Service among others.
