= Mini PC =

Low power, small and cheap computer meant for light tasks

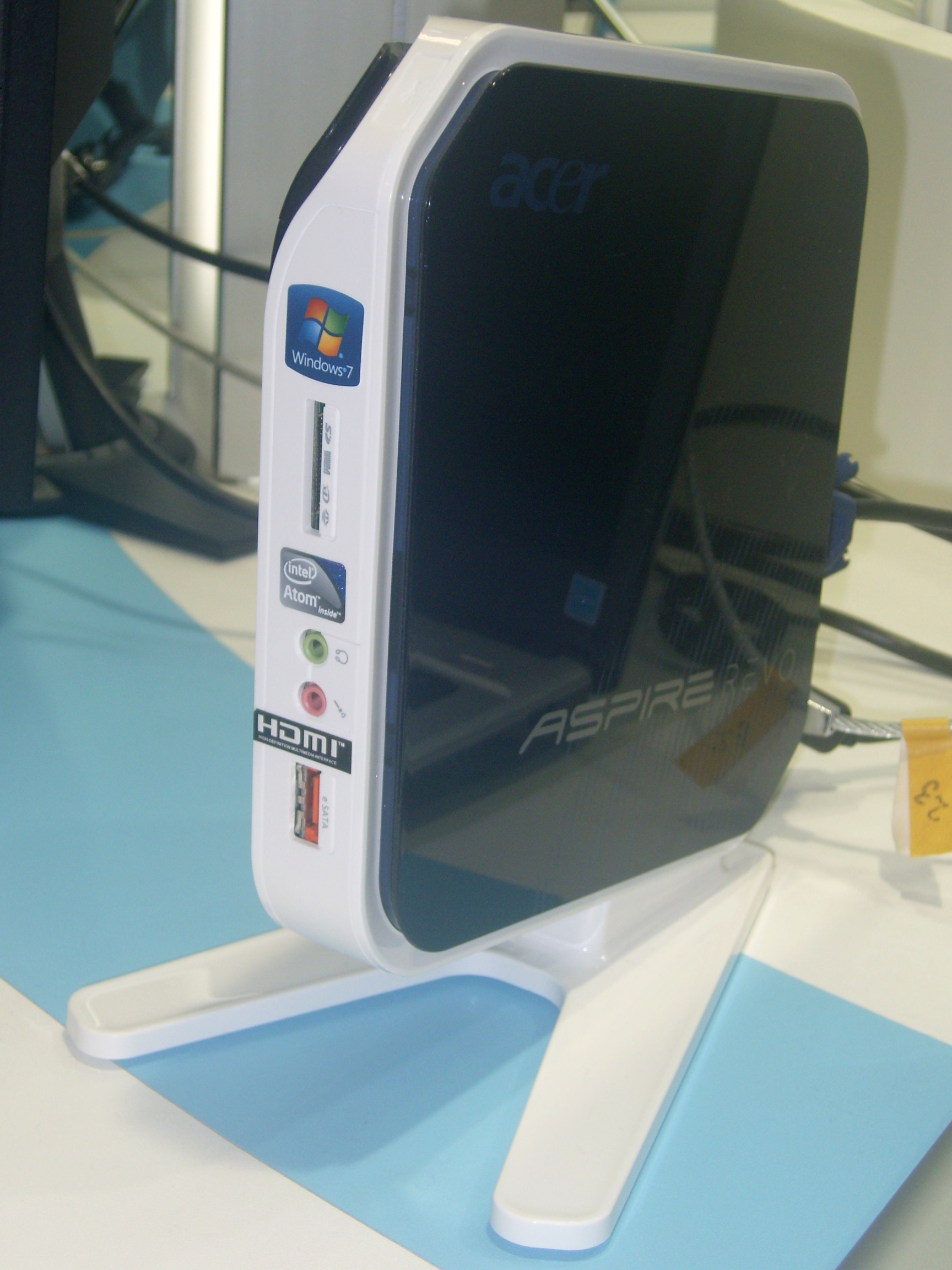
The Acer AspireRevo nettop

A mini PC (or miniature PC, nettop, or Smart Micro PC) is a small-sized, inexpensive, low-power, legacy-free desktop computer designed for basic tasks such as web browsing, accessing web-based applications, document processing, and audio/video playback.

The word nettop is a portmanteau of network and desktop. It is the desktop counterpart of the netbook. Modern (c. 2020) mini PCs or small form factor PCs can be much more powerful, being equipped with high-end laptop components or mid-range desktop components.

Compared with ordinary desktop computers, nettops are not only smaller and less expensive, but they also consume much less power. For example, CompuLab's fit-PC2 consumes no more than 8 watts of power whereas a typical desktop would easily consume more than 100 watts of power; consequently, nettops require significantly less cooling and may even be completely fanless. Some do not have an optical disk drive and use a solid-state drive, making them completely silent. The tradeoff is that the hardware specifications and processing power are usually reduced and hence make nettops less appropriate for running complex or resource-intensive applications.

== Hardware ==
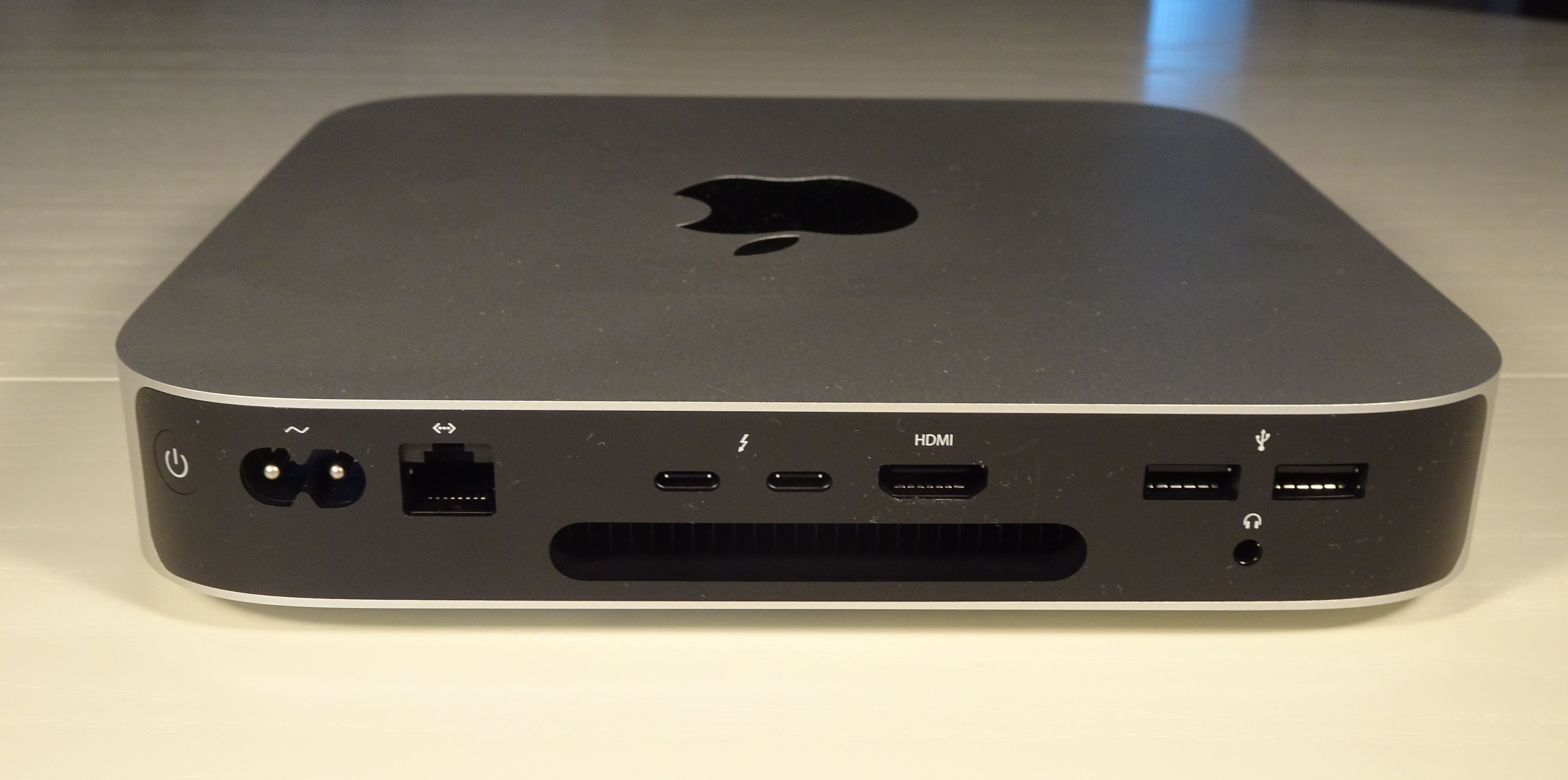
Mac Mini 2020 (M1)

There are several platforms that are primarily intended for nettops and netbooks:

- Intel's Atom platform
- Nvidia's Ion platform
- Intel's Core platform
- AMD's APU platform
- VIA's Trinity Platform

There are several mini PC platforms:

- Apple Mac mini
- Intel / ASUS NUC

Some nettops have also adopted system-on-a-chip designs. Although many major parts such as chipsets, video cards and storage devices can also be found on desktops, the CPUs that are put inside nettops are the fundamental component that differentiate them from normal desktops. The list below contains a range of hardware components that a typical nettop may be assembled from.

- CPU
  - Intel Atom, Intel Core (x86)
  - VIA Nano and VIA C7 processors (x86)
  - AMD APU (x86)
  - AMD Geode (x86)
  - ARM Cortex-based CPU (ARM)
  - Loongson (MIPS)
- GPU
  - Intel GMA 950
  - Intel UHD Graphics
  - S3 Graphics Chrome
  - GeForce 9400M G (integrated into MCP79MX; Nvidia Ion platform)
  - AMD Radeon HD 6310
  - ATI Radeon HD 4530
  - PowerVR
- Chipset
  - 945GSE and 945GC Express chipsets
  - MCP79MX (integrated GeForce 9400M G GPU; Nvidia Ion platform)
  - VIA VX800 IGP Chipset
- Storage devices
  - 2.5" hard disk drive
  - Solid-state drive (SSD)
  - Embedded multimedia card (eMMC)
- Network
  - Ethernet and/or Wi-Fi
- I/O ports
  - LAN, USB, video out, audio out

Intel's Atom processor has been adopted by several hardware manufacturers, such as ASUS, MSI, and Sony, for nettops. Nvidia has also released its first generation ION platform, which puts GeForce 9400M Motherboard GPU alongside the Atom processor to provide better high definition video playback ability and lower power consumption. In addition, Nvidia has announced that it will support VIA's CPUs this year. To further reduce the manufacturing cost and improve power efficiency, many manufacturers and start-up companies have chosen to use CPUs that were originally targeted at embedded computing devices such as AMD's Geode and ARM Cortex-based CPUs.

Apple's 2024 Mac mini with the M4 system-on-a-chip (SoC) features a significantly smaller design than earlier models, with a 5x5-inch form factor often described as slightly larger than an Apple TV 4K. Apple claims up to 50% more CPU performance and 4× more GPU performance on the M4 compared to the M2. The M4 competes for the highest-scoring consumer SoC for single-core benchmarks according to various sources such as the Geekbench benchmarking suite and Passmark Software's CPU benchmarks. In doing so, M4's single-core performance competes with AMD's Ryzen 7 9700X and Intel's Core i9-14900K.

== Operating systems ==
Many net-top models are x86-processor-based and as such are capable of running standard PC OSes. There are also operating systems designed specifically for nettops and other machines in the same performance class. Some high-end nettops are capable of running Windows 10. Linux, Android, ChromeOS, and Raspberry Pi OS are other options. Although Google's Android was originally designed for smartphones, it has also taken a seat in the nettop market.

== Market ==
Nettops fell into Intel's category of "Basic PC", which usually cost from $100 to $299. Intel described nettops as a large potential market at that time. Nettops were said to be able to serve as an affordable first computer for people in developing countries, or as an environmentally friendly choice as a secondary computer for people in developed countries.

== Notable brands ==
- Acer
- Apple (Mac Mini)
- Asus
- CHUWI
- Beelink
- Dell
- GEEKOM
- GMKtec
- HP
- Lenovo
- Micro-Star International
- Minisforum

== See also ==
- AMD APU and Intel Atom
- Apple TV (device)
- Chromebox
- Desktop computer § Form factor
- Internet appliance
- Netbook
- Stick PC
- Plug computer
- Small form factor PC
- Tablet computer
- Thin client
