= List of Ultrabook models =

This is a list of Ultrabook models.

== Huron River ==
Brand – model (Note: Information describes base model of laptop offered by manufacturer unless otherwise noted.)	Price of base model (Note: Pricing announced (in USD and on the US market, unless specified) by manufacturer or at time of product release)	Release date	Intel processor of base model	Base GPU	Base RAM capacity	Base drive capacity	Minimum/maximum thickness (Note: Some Ultrabooks have a uniform thickness.)	Weight	Battery life	Display size	Resolution
Acer Aspire S3-951	$899	October 2011	i5-2467M (1.6 GHz)		4 GiB	320 GB HDD + 20 GiB SSD (Note: These models include two drives. The SSD is pre-configured to store only hibernation data (for faster S4 resume).)	13.10/17.50 mm (0.51/0.69 in)	1.40 kg (2.98 lb)	36 Wh, ~6 hours	13.3"	1366×768
Acer Aspire S3-951	$1,200	November 2011	i5-2467M (1.6 GHz) or i7-2637M (1.7 GHz)		4 GiB	256 GB SSD	13.10/17.50 mm (0.51 in / 0.69 in)	1.35 kg (2.98 lb)	36 Wh, ~6 hours	13.3"	1366×768
Asus Zenbook UX21E	$1,000	October 2011	i5-2467M (1.6 GHz)	HD 3000	4 GiB	128 GB SSD	16.76 mm (0.66 in)	1.10 kg (2.43 lb)	35 Wh, ~5 hours	11.6"	1366×768
Asus Zenbook UX31E	$1,100	October 2011	i5-2557M (1.7 GHz) or i7-2677M (1.8 GHz)	HD 3000	4 GiB	128/256 GB SSD	17.00 mm (0.67 in)	1.30 kg (2.90 lb)	50 Wh, ~7 hours	13.3" (glossy)	1600×900
Dell XPS 13	$1,000	February 2012	i5-2467M (1.6 GHz)	HD 3000	4 GiB	128 GB SSD	6–18 mm; 12 mm (0.47 in) average	1.36 kg (3 lb)	47 Wh, ~8 hours	13.3" (glossy)	1366×768
HP Folio 13	$930	December 2011	i5-2467M (1.6 GHz)	HD 3000	4 GiB	128 GB SSD	18.00 mm (0.7 in)	1.49 kg (3.3 lb)	59 Wh, ~9 hours	13.3"	1366×768
HP Envy 14 Spectre	$1,400	February 2012	i5-2467M (1.6 GHz)	HD 3000	4 GiB	128 GB SSD	20.00 mm (0.8 in)	1.8 kg (3.95 lb)	~9 hours	14" (radiance, glossy)	1600×900
Lenovo IdeaPad U300s	$1,000	November 2011	i5-2467M (1.6 GHz)		4 GiB	128 GB SSD	14.99 mm (0.59 in)	1.34 kg (2.95 lb)	54 Wh, ~8 hours	13.3" (glossy)	1366×768
Lenovo IdeaPad U300e	$800	February 2012	i3-2367M (1.4 GHz) or i5-2467M (1.6 GHz)		2 GiB	500 GB HDD + 32 GB SSD	18.3 mm (0.72 in)	1.58 kg (3.5 lb)	~8 hours	13.3"	1366×768
LG X-Note Z330	$1,500	December 2011	i5-2467M (1.6 GHz)		4 GiB	120 GB SSD	14.7 mm (0.58 in)	1.21 kg (2.67 lb)	~6 hours	13.3"	1366×768
Samsung Series 5 13"	$900	January 2012	i5-2467M (1.6 GHz)		8 GiB max	128/256 GiB SSD / 500 GB HDD	14/17.6 mm (0.55 in / 0.69 in)	1.38 kg (3 lb)	45 Wh, ~6 hours	13"	1366×768
Samsung Series 5 14"	$1,100	January 2012	i5-2467M (1.6 GHz)		8 GiB max	128/256 GiB SSD / 1 TB HDD	20.9 mm (0.82 in)	1.84 kg (4.06 lb)	45 Wh, ~6 hours	14"	1366×768
Toshiba Portégé Z830	$900	November 2011	i3-2367M (1.4 GHz) (i5, i7 models exist)		4 GiB	128 GB SSD	16.00 mm (0.63 in)	1.11 kg (2.45 lb)	47 Wh, ~8 hours	13.3" (matte or glossy)	1366×768
Toshiba Portégé Z835	$800	November 2011	i3-2367M (1.4 GHz)		4 GiB	128 GB SSD	16.00 mm (0.63 in)	1.11 kg (2.45 lb)	47 Wh, ~8 hours	13.3"	1366×768

== Chief River ==
Brand – model	Price of base model	Release date	Intel processor of base model	Base GPU	Base RAM capacity	Base drive capacity	Minimum/maximum thickness	Weight	Battery life	Display size	Resolution
Acer Aspire S5	$1,400	June 2012	i7-3517U (1.9 GHz)	Intel HD 4000	4 GiB	256 GB SSD	14.9 mm (0.59 in)	1.35 kg (2.97 lb)	~4.5 hours	13.3"	1366×768
Asus Vivobook S400CA	$750	Q3 2012	i5-3317U (1.7 GHz)	Intel HD 4000	4 GiB	500 GB HD + 24 GB SSD Hybrid	21 mm	1.8 kg (3.96 lb)	~5 h	14"	1366×768 w/touch
Asus Zenbook Prime UX31A	$1,100	Q2 2012	i5-3317U (1.7 GHz)*	Intel HD 4000	4 GiB	128 GB SSD*	11.18/16.76 mm (0.44/0.66 in)	1.30 kg (2.87 lb)	~6 hours	13.3"	1920×1080
Asus Zenbook Prime UX32VD	$1,300	Q2 2012	i5-3317U (1.7 GHz)	Nvidia GeForce GT 620M	4 GiB*	320 GB HDD/24 GB SSD cache	18 mm (0.71 in)	1.44 kg (3.17 lb)	Unknown	13.3" IPS	1920×1080
Dell XPS 14 (2012)	$1,100	June 2012	i7-3517U (2.4 GHz)	Intel HD 4000 or Nvidia GeForce GT 630M	4 GiB (8 GiB option available)	500 GB HDD + 32 GB SSD cache or 512 GB SSD*	20.6 mm (0.81 in)	2.09 kg (4.6 lb)	11 hours	14"	1600×900
Fujitsu Lifebook UH572	$1,000	June 2012	i5-3317U (1.7 GHz)	Intel HD 4000	4 GiB	500 GB HDD + 32 GiB cache	18 mm (0.71 in)	1.6 kg (3.5 lb)	5 hours	13.3"	1366×768
Fujitsu Lifebook U772	$1,150	June 2012	i5-3317U (1.7 GHz)*	Intel HD 4000	4 GiB	320+ HDD w/ 32 GB cache or 128+ GB SSD	17.5 mm (0.69 in)	1.5 kg (3.2 lb)	7 hours	14"	1366×768
HP Envy Ultrabook 6t-1000	$900	May 2012	i5-2467M (late 2012: i5-3317U)	Intel HD 3000*	2 GiB DDR3*	320 GB HDD*	19.8 mm (0.78 in)	2.16 kg (4.75 lb)	Up to 8.25 hours	15.6"	1366×768
Lenovo Thinkpad T430u	$850	Q3 2012	i3-3217U (1.8 GHz)		4 GiB	128 GB SSD or 1 TB HDD	20.3 mm (0.8 in)	1.77 kg (3.9 lb)	~6 hours	14" (matte)	1366×768
Lenovo Thinkpad X1 Carbon	$1399	August 2012	i5-3317U	Intel HD 4000	4 GiB/8 GiB	128 GB SSD	18 mm (0.71 in)	1.3 kg (2.9 lb)	6.3 hours	14" (matte)	1600×900
Lenovo IdeaPad Yoga 13	$1,099	26 October 2012	Ivy Bridge	Intel HD 4000	4/8 GiB	256 GB SSD	17 mm (0.67 in)	1.54 kg (3.4 lb)	~8 hours	13.3" (folds into tablet)	1600×900
Lenovo IdeaPad U310	$700	May 2012	i5-3317U	Intel HD 4000	4 GiB	64 GB SSD or 500 GB HDD	18 mm (0.71 in)	1.7 kg (3.75 lb)	~8 hours	13.3"	1366×768
Lenovo IdeaPad U410	$700	May 2012	i5-3317U	NVIDIA GeForce GT 610M 1 GiB	4 GiB	64 GB SSD or 500 GB HDD	21 mm (0.83 in)	1.9 kg (4.2 lb)	~8 hours	14"	1366×768
Novatech nFinity N1409	£524.99		i3-3217U (1.80 GHz)	Intel HD 4000	4 GiB	120 GB SSD	17.9 mm (0.70 in)	1.8 kg (3.91 lb)	Unknown	14"	1366×768
Novatech nFinity N1410	£559.99		i5-3317U (1.70 GHz)	Intel HD 4000	8 GiB	120 GB SSD	17.9 mm (0.70 in)	1.8 kg (3.91 lb)	Unknown	14"	1366×768
Novatech nFinity N1411	£699.98		i7-3517U (1.70 GHz)	Intel HD 4000	8 GiB	240 GB SSD	17.9 mm (0.70 in)	1.8 kg (3.91 lb)	Unknown	14"	1366×768
Gigabyte U2442V	$1,000	May 2012	Ivy Bridge (low-voltage)	NVIDIA GeForce GT 640M 2 GiB	2/4 GiB	128 GB SSD*	20,5 mm (0.81 in)	1.49 kg (3.31 lb)	Unknown	14"	1600×900
Samsung Series 9 13" (2012)	$1,400	April 2012	i5-2467M (1.6 GHz) (late 2012 models have Ivy Bridge)	Intel HD 4000	4 GiB (8 GiB max)	128 GB SSD	12.7 mm (0.5 in)	1.10 kg (2.43 lb)	40 Wh, ~7 hours	13.3" (matte)	1600×900
Samsung Series 9 15" (2012)	$1,500	April 2012	i5-2467M (1.6 GHz) (late 2012 models have Ivy Bridge)	Intel HD 4000	8 GiB	128 GB SSD (MSata upgradable)	15.74 / 16.25 mm (.62 in / .64 in)	1.59 kg (3.50 lb)	47 Wh, ~7 hours	15.0" (matte)	1600×900
ZaReason UltraLap 430	$900	August 2012	i3-3217U or i5-3317U	Intel HD 4000	4 GiB (16 GiB max)	32 to 256 GB SSD with an additional SSD (128 to 512 GiB) or HDD (250 to 500 GB)	19 mm (.75 in)	1.59 kg (3.50 lb)	44 Wh, ~6 hours	14.0"	1366×768
Toshiba Portege Z935	$926.50	Q4 2012	Core i5		6 GiB, 1600 MHz	128 GB SSD		1.12 to 1.59 kg (2.47 to 3.50 lb)	Up to 8h36	13.3"	1366×768 (16:9)
Toshiba Satellite U845W	$926.50	Q4 2012	Core i5		6 GiB, 1600 MHz	500 GiB		1.59 to 1.82 kg (3.50 to 4.00 lb)	Up to 8h36	14.4"	1792×768 (21:9)
Sony Vaio T-13	$669	May 2012	Core i3		4 GiB, 1600 MHz	320 GB	0.71 inches (18 mm) max.	1.59 kg (3.50 lb)	Up to 5h30	13.3" (11.6" in the UK)	1366×768
Samsung Series 5 Ultra Touch	$850	August 2012	Core i5		4 GiB	500 GB HDD + 24 GB SSD	0.58–0.69"	1.74 kg (3.83 lb)	Unknown	13.3"	1366×768
HP Pavilion Ultrabook 14-b002sa	£600	2013	i3-3217u (1.8 GHz)	Intel HD 4000 or Nvidia GT 630M	6GiB DDR3 (8 GB max)	500 GB HDD 32 GB SSD for caching			Unknown	14"	1366×768

== Shark Bay ==
Brand – model	Price of base model	Release date	Intel processor of base model	Base GPU	Base RAM capacity	Base drive capacity	Minimum/maximum thickness	Weight	Battery life	Display size	Resolution	Awards
Acer TravelMate P645-MG-9419	$1,299.99	November 2013	i7-4500U (1.8 GHz)	AMD Radeon HD 8750M, 2 GB	8 GiB (exp to 12 GB)	256 GB SSD	20.3 mm (0.8 in) max	1.52 kg (3.35 lb)	8 hours	14"	1920×1080	iF Product Design 2014, Red Dot Product Design 2014
Acer Aspire P3-171-6408	$825.00	August 2013	i3-3229Y (1.4 GHz)	Intel HD 4000	2 GiB	120 GB SSD	9.95 mm (0.4 in) max	0.79 kg (1.3 lb)	Up to 7 hours	11.6"	1366×768	Top 5 Hybrid\Convertible Laptop of 2013 by TechRadar
Acer Aspire P3	$900.00	August 2013	i5-3329Y (1.5 GHz)	Intel HD 4000	4 GiB	120 GB	9.95 mm, (0.4 in) max	0.79 kg (1.3 lb)	Up to 6 hours	11.6"	1366×768	Top 5 Hybrid\Convertible Laptop of 2013 by TechRadar
Acer Aspire S7-392-6832	$1,399.99	August 2013	i5-4200U (1.6 GHz)	Intel HD 4400	8 GiB	128 GB SSD	12.7 mm (0.5 in) max	1.3 kg (2.87 lb)	Up to 8 hours	13.3"	1920×1080	
Lenovo ThinkPad T440s	$1,319.00	August 2013	i5-4200U (1.6 GHz)	Intel HD 4400	4 GiB, 1600 MHz	128 GB SSD	21 mm (0.83 in) max	1.58 kg (3.5 lb)	Up to 6 hours	14"	1920×1080	
Sony VAIO Duo 13	$1,398.99	July 2013	i5-4200U (1.6 GHz)	Intel HD 4400	4 GiB, 1600 MHz	128 GB SSD	19.5 mm (0.77 in) max	1.33 kg (2.93 lb)	Up to 10 hours	13.3"	1920×1080	
Sony VAIO Pro 11	$1,149.99	July 2013	i5-4200U (1.6 GHz)	Intel HD 4400	4 GiB, 1600 MHz	128 GB SSD	17.3 mm (0.68 in) max	0.87 kg (1.92 lb)	Up to 7 hours	11.6"	1920×1080	
Sony VAIO Pro 13	$1,249.99	July 2013	i5-4200U (1.6 GHz)	Intel HD 4400	4 GiB, 1600 MHz	128 GB SSD	17.3 mm (0.68 in) max	1.06 kg (2.34 lb)	Up to 6.5 hours	13.3"	1920×1080	
Dell XPS 12	$1,199.99	July 2013	i5-4200U (1.6 GHz)	Intel HD 4400	4 GiB, 1600 MHz	128 GB SSD	20.0 mm (0.79 in) max	1.52 kg (3.35 lb)	Up to 8.7 hours	12.5"	1920×1080	
Samsung ATIV Book 9 Plus	$1,399.99	August 2013	i5-4200U (1.6 GHz)	Intel HD 4400	4 GiB, 1600 MHz	128 GB SSD	13.6 mm (0.54 in) max	1.39 kg (3.06 lb)	Up to 11 hours	13.3"	3200×1800	
Fujitsu U904	$999.99	September 2013	i5-4200U (1.6 GHz)	Intel HD 4400	10 GB, 1600 MHz (2 GB on board)	256 GB SSD	18 mm (0.69 in) max	1.45 kg (3.2 lb)	Up to 10 hours	14"	2560×1440	
HP Spectre 13t-3000	$999.99	September 2013	i5-4200U (1.6 GHz)	Intel HD 4400	4 GiB, 1600 MHz	128 GB SSD	18 mm (0.69 in) max	1.45 kg (3.2 lb)	Up to 9 hours	13.3"	1920×1080 (upgradeable to 2560×1440 for $70)	
Lenovo Yoga 2 Pro	$1,099.00	October 2013	i7-4500U (1.8 GHz)	Intel HD 4400	8 GiB, 1600 MHz	256 GB SSD	15.5 mm (0.61 in) max	1.39 kg (3.06 lb)	Up to 9 hours	13.3"	3200×1800	

Notes:
* This component is upgradable. That is, the manufacturer allows the user to customize/upgrade this component of the ultrabook at time of purchase to one of several better options for an increase in price. Some manufacturers or stores charge more, and will require wait time and/or home delivery for customized models. For more details on the available upgrades for a model, click on the references listed next to the model name.
