= IdeaPad Z series =

Series of laptops

The IdeaPad Z Series is designed primarily for entry-level multimedia users. The first three Z Series IdeaPad laptops were the Z360, Z460 and Z560, with 13 inch, 14 inch, and 15 inch screens respectively. All three laptops were released in 2010.

== 2010 ==
The first IdeaPad Z Series laptops were launched in 2010. These were the Z360, Z460, and Z560 laptops.

=== Z360 ===
The IdeaPad Z360 was launched in 2010 and was appreciated for its 500GB hard disk drive, WiDi and WiMAX options, keyboard, and navigation. However, the design met with disfavor and was unappreciated by reviewers. Another point in the laptop's favor was the price and the processor – the Intel i3-750 with a speed of 2.4 GHz. LAPTOP Magazine called the keyboard “phenomenal” and said that “this makes typing on the Z360 a wonderful experience”. The color contrast on the screen was also appreciated, as was the depth of sound provided by the speakers.

The laptop's specifications are as follows:

- Processor: Up to Intel Core i5-480M
- Chipset: Intel HM55
- Memory: Up to 8GB PC3-8500 1066 MHz DDR3
- Graphics: Intel HD
- Dimensions (mm): 327 × 219 × 20 to 34
- Weight: 4.41 lbs

=== Z460 ===
The IdeaPad Z460 laptop, also launched in 2010, was appreciated for its both good looks and good value by tech2. While the glossy outer lid was reported by PCMagazine to retain fingerprints and smudges, the brushed metal interior was said to feel “premium on touch”. The Chiclet keyboard on the Z460 was noted as being comfortable to type on, with good feedback on key presses and no flex. The only problem listed for the laptop was the maximum RAM – 2GB only.

=== Z560 ===
The IdeaPad Z560, the third Z Series laptop launched in 2010, had roughly the same positive and negative points as other models in the Z Series.

The laptop was appreciated by Notebook Review for its keyboard, touchpad, and build quality similar to the Z460. PCMag also appreciated the laptop's keyboard and navigation, as well as the inclusion of an ExpressCard slot, the speaker system, the affordable price and the 500GB hard disk drive.

Notebook Review listed the negative points of the laptop as low battery life and poor screen contrast while PCMag indicated the lack of color options and the low RAM (3GB). One difference in the reviews, however, was that PCMag called the design ‘dated’, while Notebook Review called the Z560 stylish, and said that it “could almost pass off for a business notebook in the right setting”.

The laptop's specifications are as follows:

- Processor: Up to Intel Core i5-480M
- Chipset: Intel HM55
- Memory: Up to 8GB PC3-8500 1066 MHz DDR3
- Graphics: NVIDIA GeForce 310M, 1GB memory
- Dimensions (mm) 376.8 × 249.8 × 17.3 to 34.9
- Weight: starting at 5.73 lbs

== 2011 ==
The 2011 IdeaPad laptops launched by Lenovo were the Z370, Z470, and Z570. All three laptops incorporated Intel Sandy Bridge processors.

=== Z370 ===
Released in 2011, the Z370 laptop offered the following specifications:

- Processor: Up to Intel Core i5-2520M
- Memory: Up to 6GB DDR3 1066/1333 MHz (2 slots)
- Graphics:
  - Intel HD 3000 +
  - NVIDIA GeForce 410M (512MB/1GB)
- Dimensions (mm): 328 × 222 × 20 to 33
- Weight: 4.41 lbs

=== Z470 ===
Also released in 2011, the Z470 laptop offered the following specifications:

- Processor: Up to 2nd generation Intel Core i7
- Memory: Up to 16 GB DDR3 (2 slots)
- Graphics: Intel Integrated, + NVIDIA GeForce GT520M (1GB video RAM)
- Weight: starting at 4.85 lbs

== 2012 ==
The 2012 IdeaPad laptops launched by Lenovo are the Z575. Incorporates AMD processors.

=== Z575 ===
The first IdeaPad laptop launched by Lenovo in 2012, this laptop has:

- Processor: AMD A4-3300M/A6-3400M/A8-3500M
- Memory: Up to 8GB PC3-10600 DDR3 1333 MHz (2 slots)
- Storage: 750 GB 5400rpm HDD
- Graphics:
  - AMD Radeon HD 6480G + 6650M
  - AMD Radeon HD 6620G
- Dimensions (mm): 376 × 222 × 20~35.5
- Screen: 15.6", 1366×768 resolution
- Weight: 5.73 lbs

=== Z570 ===
The third Z Series laptop released in 2011, the Z570 offered the following specifications:

- Processor: Up to Intel Core i7
- Memory: Up to 8GB DDR3 1333 MHz (2 slots)
- Graphics:
  - Intel HD 3000+
    - NVIDIA GeForce GT540M (2GB video RAM) or
    - NVIDIA GeForce GT520M (1GB video RAM)
- Dimensions (mm): 376 × 250 × 20~35.5
- Weight: starting at 5.73 lbs
