= Lenovo Yoga =

Line of consumer-oriented laptop computers and tablets

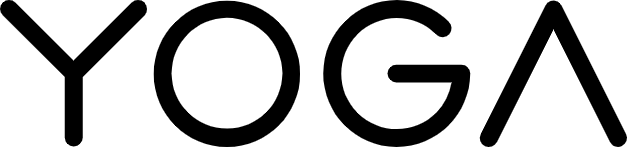
- Logo since 2022

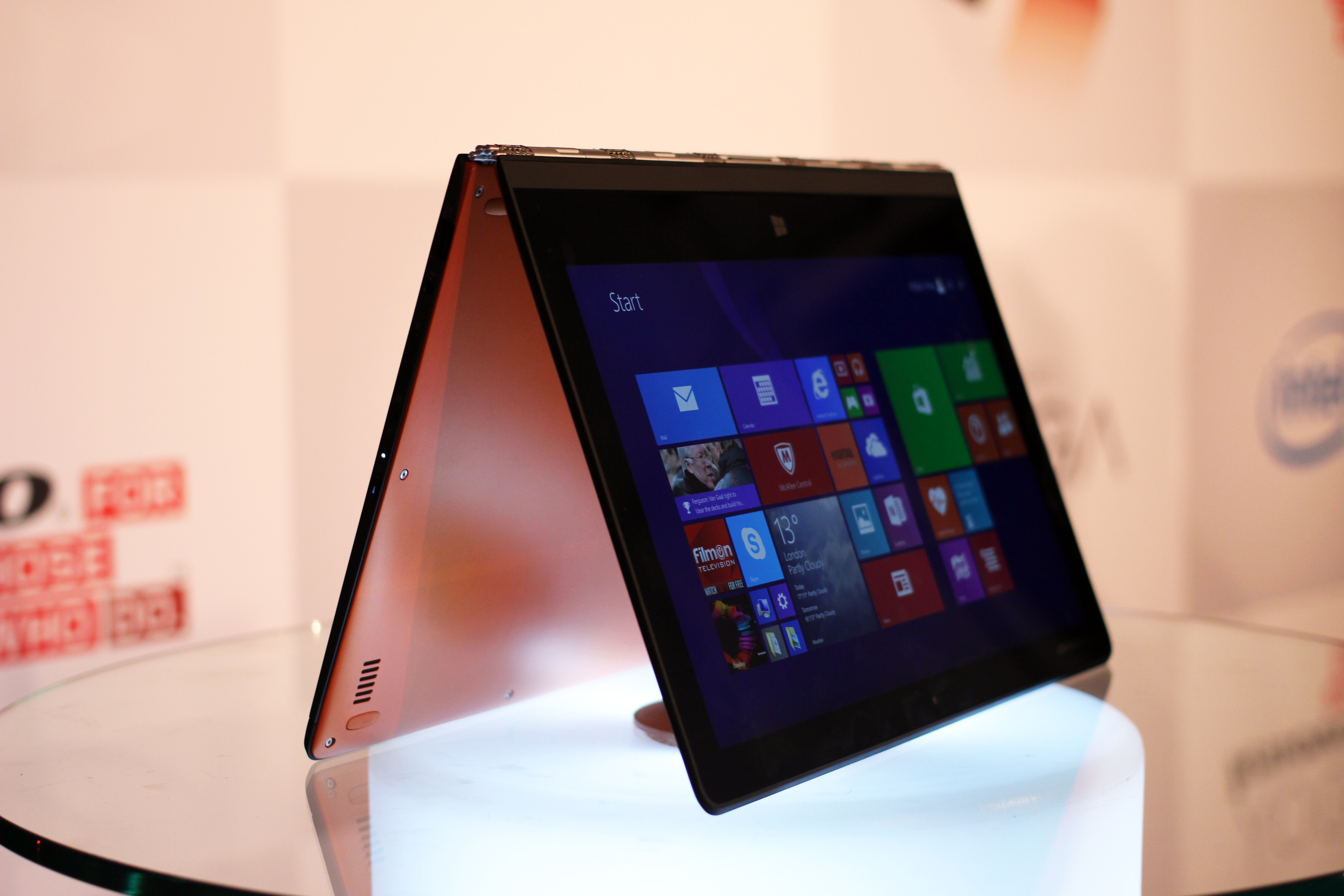
- Developer: Lenovo
- Manufacturer: Wistron
- Type: 2-in-1 PC, All-in-one PC
- Released: October 26, 2012; 14 years ago
- Operating system: Windows, Linux
- CPU: AMD, Intel
- Display: 11.6"-15"
- Graphics: AMD, Nvidia
- Power: Up to 100 W
- Marketing target: Consumer
- Related: ThinkPad Yoga sub-line, IdeaPad Flex, IdeaPad
- Website: Yoga & Lenovo Slim Laptops, 2-in-1s, and All-in-One PCs | Lenovo US

Lenovo Yoga (stylized as Lenovo YOGA or simply YOGΛ) is a line of consumer-oriented high-end laptop computers, tablets, and all-in-one computers designed, developed and marketed by Lenovo, named for their ability to assume multiple form factors due to a hinged screen.

The line currently competes against other 2-in-1 PCs such as the HP Spectre, Acer Spin and Asus Transformer.

== 2012 ==
=== Lenovo IdeaPad Yoga 13 ===
The Yoga 13's capacitive touch display allows for up to 10-point touch control. The Yoga 13 is powered by Intel's Chief River platform, using an Ivy Bridge processor, has 4 GB or 8 GB of RAM, and SSD with 128 GB or 256 GB. The battery life of the Yoga 13 is estimated to be around eight hours. After testing the Yoga 13's battery life, TechRadar said, "Our only real concern is that the battery life is squarely average. In our Battery Eater test, which maxes out the system until the battery dies, we only clocked 177 minutes, which is short of the 200-minute gold standard. This said, in normal day-to-day usage, we experienced closer to six to eight hours of life, depending on the screen brightness and CPU saturation."

The Yoga 13 makes use of a 13.3-inch display with a resolution of 1600 × 900. The display uses an IPS panel in order to provide wide viewing angles and maintain the thin profile of the Yoga 13. The Yoga 13 has 720p front-facing webcam. It has one USB 3.0 port and one USB 2.0 port, an HDMI output, a memory card reader, and a combo jack for audio input and output.

The 13-inch Yoga was released by Lenovo on 26 October 2012. Best Buy released an alternative version of the Yoga 13 with an Intel Core i5 processor (vs. Lenovo's base model's i3 processor) and no Microsoft Office (whereas Lenovo's base model includes Microsoft Office). Its smaller cousin, Yoga 11, which runs Windows RT (as opposed to the Yoga 13, running Windows 8), was released in December 2012.

=== Lenovo IdeaPad Yoga 11 ===
The Yoga 11 is powered by a quad-core Nvidia Tegra 3 that runs at a maximum clock speed of 1.3 GHz and features an integrated graphics processor. The Tegra 3 is also found in numerous Android-based tablets. 2 GB of RAM comes standard. This relatively small amount of RAM is sufficient due to the reduced memory requirements of Windows RT applications. The Yoga 11 was sold with solid state drives in 32 GB and 64 GB capacities. The Yoga 11 ran the Windows RT operating system. Microsoft Office 2013 ships pre-installed. Like all Windows RT devices, the Yoga 11 cannot run software designed for earlier versions of Windows, only apps designed for the new Metro interface are compatible.

The Lenovo IdeaPad Yoga 11 was released in late 2012. It was discontinued on July 17, 2013 due to the poor sales of Windows RT devices.

== 2013 ==
=== ThinkPad Yoga ===
The ThinkPad Yoga has a "backlit" keyboard that flattens when flipped into tablet mode. This is accomplished with a platform surrounding the keys rises until level with the keyboard buttons, a locking mechanism that prevents key presses, and feet that pop out to prevent the keyboard from directly resting on flat surfaces. Lenovo implemented this design in response to complaints about its earlier Yoga 13 and 11 models being awkward to use in tablet mode. A reinforced hinge was required to implement this design. Other than its convertible form factor, the ThinkPad Yoga is a rather standard ThinkPad device with a black magnesium-reinforced chassis, island keyboard, a red TrackPoint, and a large buttonless touchpad. The first model was powered by Haswell processors from Intel, and SATA-based SSD or hard drives were both options on this model. It has a 12.5-inch IPS touchscreen with 1080p resolution. The screen was designed for use with an optional pen-style digitizer.

=== Lenovo Yoga 2 11 ===
Lenovo Yoga 2 11
- Operating system: Windows 8.1, Windows 10
- CPU: Intel Pentium N3540 (2.16 GHz 2 MB)
- Memory: 4 GB DDR3L 1333 MHz (onboard)
- Storage: 500 GB HDD
- Display: 11.6 in, 1366×768 LED-backlit with touchscreen
- Graphics: Intel HD Graphics
- Camera: Camera with integrated microphone ^{(Front-facing)}
- Connectivity: USB 3.0 port, 2 USB 2.0 ports, 1 Mini-HDMI port, SD card reader Audio combo jack
- Dimensions: W×H×D 11.8 in (30 cm) × 7.9 in (20 cm) × 0.826 in (2.10 cm)
- Weight: 3.1 lb (1.4 kg)

The Lenovo Yoga 2 11 is an Ultrabook-class convertible device that can be used as both a tablet and laptop computer. The Yoga 2 11 is thinner than the Yoga 11 and has tapered edges giving it an appearance more like a conventional Ultrabook laptop vs the earlier model's pleasing "book-like" symmetrical design. The Yoga 2 11 has a subtle rubber trim around the edge of its top half in order to prevent slipping on hard surfaces when in tent mode.

=== Lenovo Yoga 2 Pro ===
The Yoga 2 Pro is an Ultrabook-class device. It weighs 3.1 pounds, is 0.61 inch thick and has tapered edges, giving it an appearance more like a conventional ultrabook laptop vs the earlier model's "book-like" symmetrical design. The Yoga 2 Pro features a 360-Degree Flip-and-Fold design that encompasses four modes—laptop, stand, tablet, and tent mode and has a subtle rubber trim around the edge of its top half in order to prevent slipping on hard surfaces when in tent mode. It comes with a backlit AccuType keyboard and features stereo speakers with Dolby Home Theater. Unlike earlier Yoga products, the home button has a touch-key on the bottom center of the display. Lenovo moved the power button away from the front and to the side in order to prevent accidental key presses.

The base model has an Intel Core i3 4010U, 4 gigabytes of RAM, and a 128-gigabyte solid state drive with configurations up to an Intel Core i7 4500U, 8 gigabytes of RAM, and a 512-gigabyte solid-state drive. The 13.3-inch screen uses in-plane switching (IPS) technology, has a high resolution QHD+ (3200×1800) 10-point multitouch display, and a brightness of 350 nits. The Yoga 2 Pro has Intel Wireless Display technology in order to conform to the Ultrabook specification. It has ports for USB 3.0, USB 2.0, micro-HDMI, a 2-in-1 card reader, and a combination audio input-output jack. Lenovo claimed a battery life of up to nine hours.

=== IdeaPad Yoga 11S ===
The IdeaPad Yoga 11S is a compact ultralight hybrid notebook-tablet computer released in 2013. The Yoga 11S runs the full version of Microsoft's Windows 8 operating system.

== 2014 ==
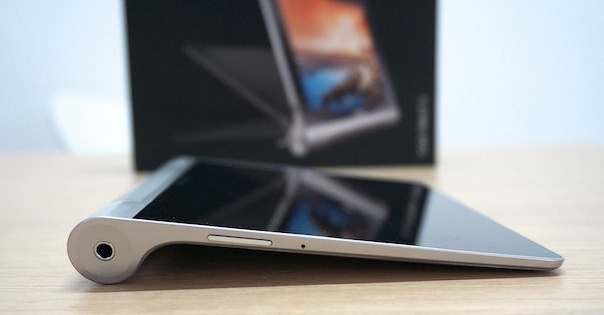
Lenovo Yoga Tablet with packaging

=== Lenovo IdeaPad Yoga Tablet ===
The IdeaPad Yoga Tablet is an Android tablet with a multi-mode device with a rear kickstand designed to allow it to be placed upright for viewing videos and other media or tilted for easier text entry. The Yoga Tablet has a round battery that can last as long as 18 hours. It comes in models with 10-inch and 8-inch screens. Internal storage varies from 16 gigabytes to 32 gigabytes. An upgraded version was added in February 2014, called Lenovo Yoga Tablet 10 HD+, which featured a full HD display and a Qualcomm Snapdragon processor. In addition the third-generation pro has a built-in projector.

=== Lenovo Yoga 3 ===
The Yoga 3 comes in versions with 11.6-inch and 14-inch screens, both with 1080p resolution. The screens can rotate 360 degrees for use as a laptop or tablet. The Yoga 3 can also be placed in "tent mode" where it acts as a stand for itself while hiding its keyboard for activities like watching movies. It uses an Intel Core M processor. The 14-inch model is offered with Core i5 and Core i7 versions. Both models can accommodate up to 8 gigabytes of memory. Configurations with up to 500 gigabytes of SSD capacity are available.

=== Lenovo Yoga 3 Pro ===
The Yoga 3 Pro is thin Broadwell-based 13.3-inch touchscreen laptop with a hinge that allows for use as a tablet and other configurations. It uses Intel Core M processors and comes standard with solid-state drives. Its screen has 3200 pixel by 1800 pixel resolution and is multitouch capable. It is 13 millimeters thick. The Yoga 3 Pro's hinge differs significantly from the Yoga 2 Pro. The new all-metal hinge is referred to by Lenovo as a "watchband". It is much less bulky and forms a continuous curved shape from the chassis of the laptop to the bottom of the screen. It has six mounting points as opposed to two for a more solid feel and structural strength.

In a review for PC World, Elias Plastiras wrote, "It's super-light and easy to handle as a laptop and as a tablet, and it feels good to type on for long periods of time. Basically, as far as user comfort is concerned, it's excellent. That said, it does have some issues. It can tend to get noticeably warm when you're streaming video or performing other tasks that make plenty of use of the CPU and Wi-Fi adapter, and the battery life is also not great, primarily due to the large screen resolution that needs a lot of power to be bright."

== 2015 ==
=== Yoga Tablet 2 with AnyPen ===
The Yoga Tablet 2 with AnyPen is a Windows-based tablet computer with an 8-inch 1080p display. It weighs .43 kg and Lenovo claims it has a battery life of 15 hours. Lenovo's AnyPen technology allows the use of pencils, ballpoint pens, and other traditional writing instruments to write on the screen like a stylus. The Yoga Tablet 2 was released in January 2015.

=== Yoga 300 ===
Lenovo Yoga 300
- Operating system: Windows 10
- CPU: Intel Celeron
- Memory: 4 GB, 1600 MHz DDR3L (soldered)
- Display: 11.6", 1366×768 LED-backlit with touchscreen
- Graphics: Intel HD Graphics only
- Camera: Camera with integrated microphone ^{(Front-facing)}
- Connectivity: 1 USB 3.0 port, 2 USB 2.0 ports, 1 HDMI output, 1 RJ-45 Ethernet port, SD card reader Audio combo jack
- Dimensions: 299.0 × 209.0 × 21.8 mm
- Weight: 1.39 kg

The Yoga 300 is a basic convertible Ultrabook-class device. In some countries, it is renamed as Flex 3. The yoga 300 is a budget version for Yoga class. It became the most affordable Yoga Series. With only 11.6 inch display, it is also known as the smallest Yoga laptop but it is quite heavy with 1.39 kilograms of weight. It uses Intel Celeron processors, integrated graphics, 500-gigabyte hard drive or a 1-terabyte hard drive, and up to 8 gigabytes of RAM. It uses a 30 watt-hour battery which can stand until 5 hours. For connectivity, it has one USB 3.0 port, two USB 2.0 ports, one full-sized HDMI port. This device has High Definition display with 1366×768 pixel.

=== Yoga 500 ===
Lenovo Yoga 500
- Operating system: Windows 10
- CPU: Up to 6th Gen Intel Core i7
- Memory: Up to 8GB DDR3L
- Storage: Up to 1TB HDD / 1TB SSHD
- Display: 14" or 15.6" Up to 1920×1080 anti-glare, 220 or 200 nits
- Graphics: Up to NVIDIA GeForce 940M 2GB
- Sound: 2 × 1.5W Stereo speakers with Dolby DS1.0 Home Theater certification
- Camera: 0.3M Single Array or HD Digital mic
- Connectivity: 2 × USB 3.0; 1 × USB 2.0; HDMI-out; 4-in-1 card reader Audio combo jack RJ-45
- Power: Up to 5.5 hours (45Wh battery); Up to 3.5 hours (30Wh battery)
- Dimensions: 15.15" × 10.03" × 0.87" (385 × 255 × 22.2 mm)
- Weight: 1.8 kg (3.96 lbs)

=== Yoga 700 ===
Lenovo Yoga 700
- Operating system: Windows 10
- CPU: 6th Gen Intel Core m5-6Y54 (1.10GHz 4MB)
- Memory: 8GB DDR3 1866 MHz
- Storage: 256GB SSD
- Display: 11.6 in (29 cm); 14.1 in (36 cm)
- Graphics: Intel HD Graphics 515
- Sound: Stereo speakers powered by Dolby Home Theater
- Camera: 1MP
- Connectivity: 1 × USB 3.0; 2 × USB 2.0 (1 with D/C-in); Micro HDMI-out; 4-in-1 Card Reader (MMC, SDHC, SDXC and SD); Audio combo jack
- Power: Up to 7 Hours
- Dimensions: 11.42" × 7.75" × 0.62" / 290 × 197 × 15.8 (mm)
- Weight: 2.4 lbs (1.1 kg)

=== Yoga 900 ===
Lenovo Yoga 900
- Operating system: Windows 10
- CPU: Intel Core i7
- Memory: 4 GB DDR3L 1333 MHz (Onboard)
- Storage: 512 GB SSD
- Display: 13.3 in (34 cm) 3200×1800 touch
- Graphics: Intel HD Graphics
- Camera: Camera with integrated microphone ^{(Front-facing)}
- Connectivity: 2 USB 3.0 port, 1 USB 2.0 port (via ext. power connector), 1 USB Type-C port, SD card reader Audio combo jack
- Dimensions: W×H×D

Like other Yoga laptops, the Yoga 900 is a fully convertible Ultrabook-class device. The Yoga 900 is the replacement for the Yoga 3 Pro. It was designed to improve upon problems with overheating and battery life. It uses Core i5 and i7 Skylake-class processors from Intel, integrated graphics, 256-gigabyte or 512-gigabyte solid state drives, and up to 16 gigabytes of RAM. It runs on a 66 watt-hour battery. It is somewhat heavier and thicker than the Yoga 3 Pro at 1.29 kilograms of weight and 14.9 millimeters in thickness. One USB 3.0 Type-C port (a predecessor of USB 3.1, featuring lower power delivery and data rates) and a USB 2.0 port are included; but the device cannot be charged by USB-C.

The device has a 3200×1800 pixel display. Unlike its successor Yoga 910, it features programmer-friendly PgUp/PgDown/Pos1/End keys. The Business Edition version of the Lenovo Yoga 900 is primarily differentiated from the standard model through its implementation of enterprise-grade security via a Trusted Platform Module chip and accompanying security software.

==== Business Edition ====
The Business Edition version of the Yoga 900 is primarily differentiated from the standard model through its implementation of enterprise grade security via a Trusted Platform Module chip and accompanying security software.

== 2016 ==
=== Yoga Book ===
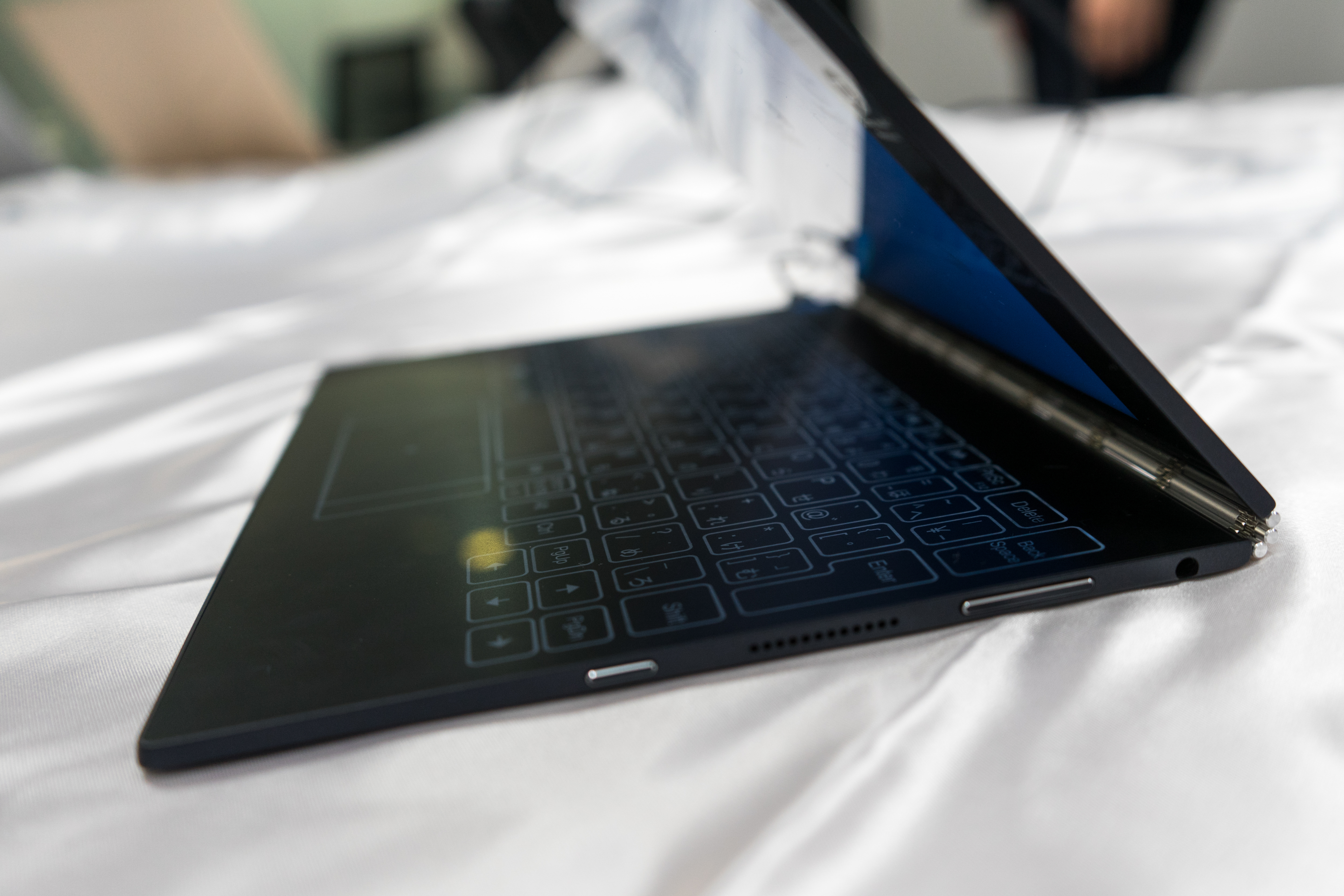
Typing mode

The Yoga Book is a compact hybrid tablet designed similarly to the Yoga laptops that is available in both Android Marshmallow and Windows 10 Home versions. Featuring the same "watchband hinge" as the Yoga 3 Pro, the major difference is that the traditional mechanical keyboard is replaced with a pressure-sensitive "Create Pad" that responds to an active stylus with 2,048 levels of pressure and a backlit, touch-sensitive "Halo Keyboard" with haptic feedback. The device is powered by an Intel Atom x5 processor and has a 10.1-inch full HD screen, 4 GB of RAM, and 64 GB of internal storage with microSD card expansion support, Dolby Atmos stereo speakers, and optional 4G LTE. It became available for sale in September 2016.

Yoga c910-13isk was released as the next version very similar design as the 900-13isk2 smaller screen bezel two usb c ports with USB charging.

=== Yoga 710 ===
Lenovo announced the Yoga 710 at the Mobile World Congress in 2016. The Yoga 710 comes in versions with 11-inch and 14-inch displays. The 11-inch version uses Intel Core M low-power processors, weighing just 2.35 lbs and 0.58 inches thin, has 8 gigabytes of memory, and includes a solid-state drive with a capacity up to 256 gigabytes. The same processor is used in Apple's 12-inch MacBook. The 14-inch version uses standard Intel Core i5 and Core i7 processors and optional Nvidia GeForce 940M or 940MX graphics processors. Both versions use 1080p IPS screens.

The above paragraph states a 11 and 14-inch model. For the Lenovo 710-15isk There is a 14 and a 15.6 inch version.

=== Yoga 720 ===
The 13.3-inch Yoga 720 (also available in a 15.6-inch model) comes with a base configuration of 2.5GHz Intel Core i5 processor, 8GB of RAM, and a 256GB SSD for storage. A higher-end model is available with a Core i7 processor, 16GB of RAM, a 1TB SSD, and a UHD-resolution display.

=== Yoga 510 ===
The Yoga 510 uses the same Intel Core i5 and Core i7 processors as the 14-inch version of the Yoga 710. It can also use AMD A9 processors. It comes in versions with 14-inch and 15-inch IPS displays with 1080p resolution. The 510 is called the Flex 4 in the United States.

== 2017 ==
=== Yoga 920 ===
Released fall 2017 the Yoga 920 was the direct successor of the Yoga 2/3 Pro, Yoga 900 and Yoga 910 laptops.

== 2018 ==
=== Yoga 530 ===
Released in early 2018, Yoga 530 is available on both Intel and AMD configuration.

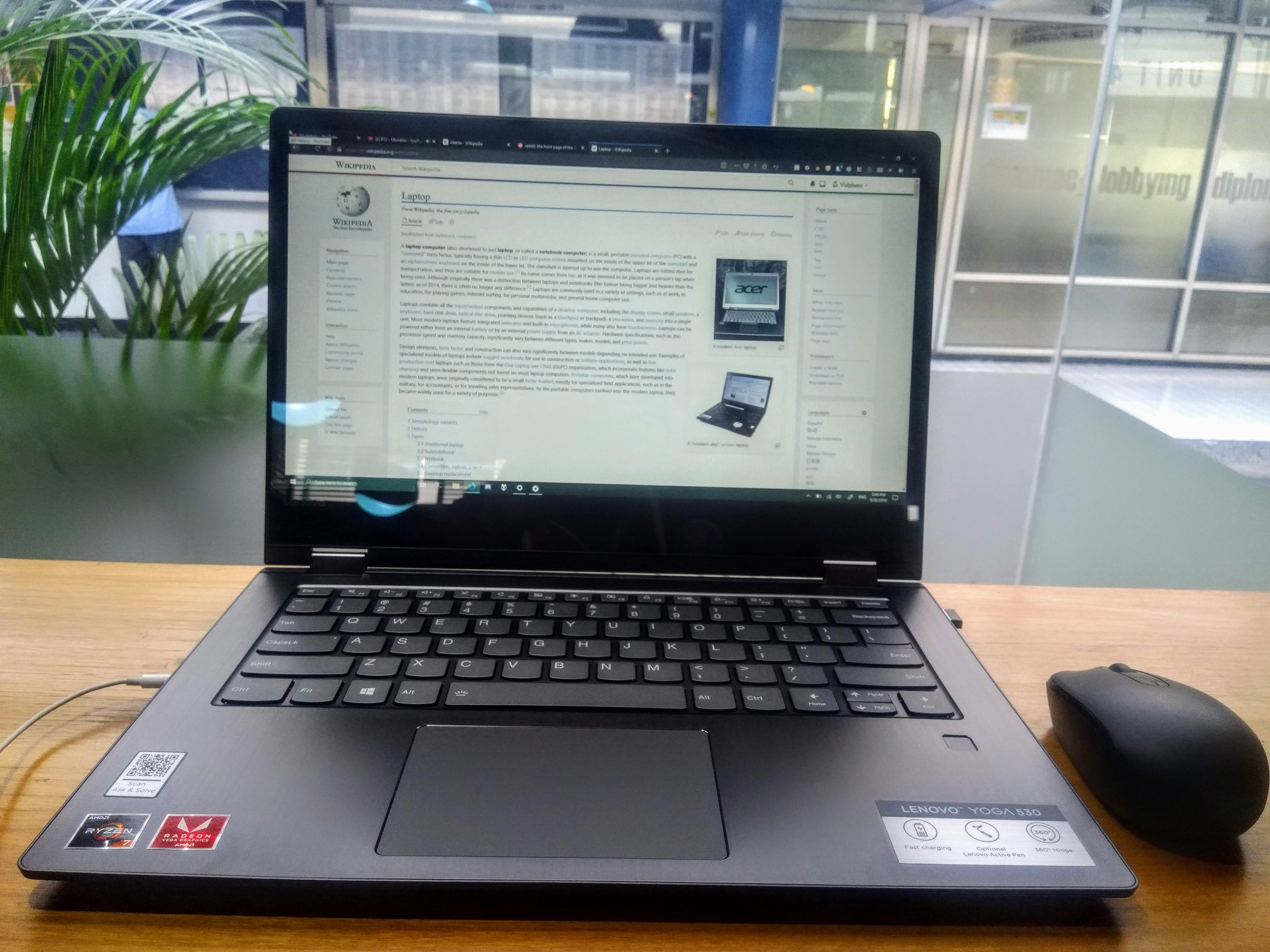
Yoga 530

=== Yoga C930 ===
Released fall 2018, Yoga C930 is the successor the Yoga 920. The previous "watchband" hinge design has been replaced by a new hinge design with integrated speakers that face the user in both tablet and laptop mode.

=== Yoga Book C930 ===
Released fall 2018, Yoga Book C930 is a 2-in-1 laptop with two screens, which replaced the traditional keyboard with an e-ink screen which functions as a keyboard, touchpad, or writer and reader tablet.

== 2019 ==
=== Yoga C640 ===
This is the lower-tier laptop of the YOGA middle-class range (YOGA 600 series and 700 series). It has a 13.3" FHD IPS Display, and Intel's 10th generation Core processors. The design of the laptop incorporates speakers into the sides of the keyboard.

=== Yoga C740 ===
This model of laptop features a 13.9" screen, with the option to add a 4K resolution panel instead of 1080p. Also featuring Intel 10th gen processors, it is one step down from the C940, the flagship of this series.

=== Yoga C940 ===
The Yoga C940 is the flagship of this series. Expanding on the C930's soundbar hinge, this model enlarges it and allows a single-hinge system, which enriches audio quality. Equipped with a 60WhR battery like last year's model allows you to expect a battery life of up to 17h on the 1080p model and 10h on the 4K model.

== 2020 ==
=== Yoga 9i ===
Lenovo 9i comes in both 14-inch and 15-inch display size, The weight is 2 kg. It includes 10th-Gen processors up to the Core i9 HK Series, two Thunderbolt 3 ports, and a GPU up to Nvidia’s GTX 1650 Ti with Max-Q design.

== 2021 ==
=== Yoga Slim 7 ===
The Yoga Slim 7 features AMD's Ryzen 4000 mobile processor, with a weight of 1.4 kg and a battery life of up to 14 hours.

== 2023 ==
=== Yoga Book 9i ===
The Yoga Book 9i is a Dual-touchscreen laptop. It has two 13.3" OLED displays and a 13th-Gen Intel processor. It has 16GB of RAM and 1TB of storage, with some models having 512GB of storage.

== Known issues ==
Many users have discovered that a Linux operating system cannot be installed on many Yoga models including the 900 ISK2, 900 ISK for business and 710. The reason that Linux cannot be installed is that Lenovo have implemented the solid state drive (SSD) on these models in RAID mode rather than the more usual AHCI. RAID mode requires additional drivers from Intel that are provided with Windows (version 7 and later) but not currently provided with Linux.

Intel recommends that all new motherboards using Intel chips should be configured using RAID even for a single disc, since this avoids problems when upgrading an AHCI configuration to multiple RAID drives later. This industry standard applies to laptops, even though they don't directly benefit with only one drive. Lenovo have followed this standard to limit the number of issues that might need troubleshooting. Although it is theoretically possible to change the mode to AHCI using a suitably programmed bootable USB stick, it is not wise to attempt it because the affected models check the UEFI configuration at startup and will detect the change and refuse to boot.

This inability to change to AHCI means that without RAID drivers, either in the system itself and on the installation media, Linux cannot be installed.

Other products are equally affected. Windows 10 itself cannot be clean installed because the bootable installation media lacks the RAID drivers (the installation would have them but it is the installer itself that lacks them). Rescue media built by the 'Backup and Restore' utility cannot restore the backed-up image to the SSD drive because it cannot see it. Even third-party disc imaging utilities such as Acronis True Image lack RAID drivers in the rescue media which are generally based on a Linux system. The RAID drivers can be injected into the boot image on USB stick rescue media (though not on DVD-based media).

In October 2016, Lenovo released 'LINUX only' versions of the BIOS for some of the affected machines. This BIOS adds the ability to switch the drive mode into AHCI. Lenovo states that these BIOSes should not be used for Windows operating systems.

Users have also reported multiple problems with hinges becoming misaligned and damaging the screen. Lenovo customer support has been heavily criticised for refusal to repair this apparent design flaw under standard, enhanced or accidental damage warranties.

== See also ==
- Lenovo Ideapad
- Lenovo ThinkPad (ThinkPad Yoga)
