= Lenovo IdeaPad Yoga 11S =

Hybrid notebook/tablet computer

The Lenovo IdeaPad Yoga 11S is a compact ultralight hybrid notebook/tablet computer released in late 2012. Like the Yoga 13 and the Yoga 11 the Yoga 11S gets its name from its ability to take on various form factors due to its screen being mounted on a special two-way hinge. The Yoga 11S runs the full version of Microsoft's Windows 8 operating system.

== Launch ==
The Yoga 11s started shipping in the United States in June 2013.

== Features ==
=== Design ===
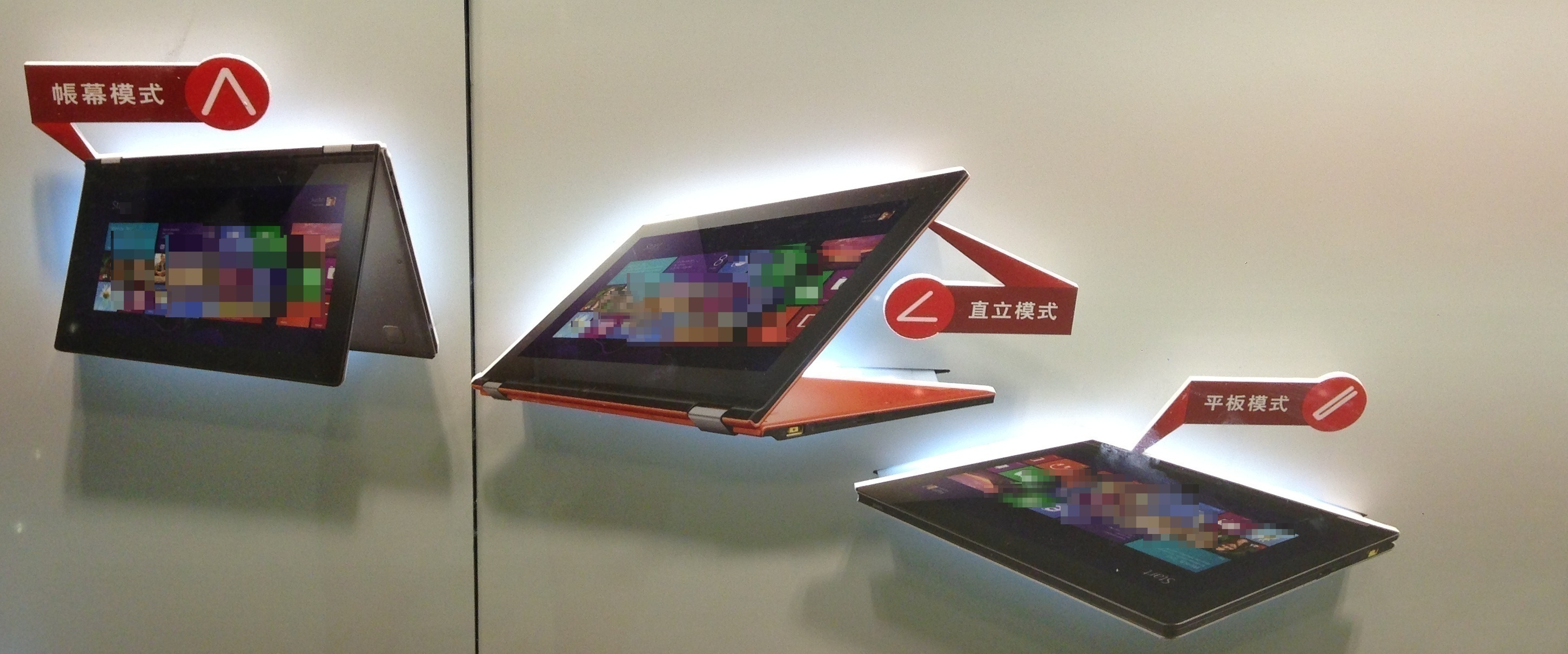
Various configurations possible with the Yoga 11S and Yoga 13

Like other models in the IdeaPad Yoga line, the Yoga 11S has a convertible form factor. Its screen can flip into a range of positions that allow it to serve as a regular laptop and tablet device as well as being able to function in "tent mode" and "stand mode." Like the Yoga 11, the 11S is available in silver and clementine orange.

=== Specifications ===
The Yoga 11S can be configured with processors as powerful as Intel's "Ivy Bridge" Core i7 processor, will support up to a 256GB solid-state drive, and can hold as much as 8GB of RAM. The Yoga 11S has an 11.6" display. Displays will be available with options for resolutions of 1366 by 768 pixels and 1600 by 900 pixels. The 11S runs the full version of Microsoft Windows 8.

== Reviews ==
CNET writes, "The 11-inch Yoga -- Lenovo's clever laptop/tablet hybrid -- had a great physical design, but ran the lame Windows RT operating system. The 13-inch Yoga ran full Windows 8, but was a bit too large for tablet duties. The upcoming Yoga 11S may be the "just right" marriage of the two: the smaller and lighter 11-inch chassis, but running full Windows 8 -- while still keeping the unique folding design."

Writing for Slash Gear, Eric Abents states, "In fact, at first glance, the only noticeable difference between the Yoga 13 and the Yoga 11S is size. The 11S is quite a bit smaller than the Yoga 13, but both are running Windows 8 (remember that – this isn’t Windows RT you’ll be dealing with. The fact that the Yoga series is running Windows 8 is definitely appreciated, and I’m sure it might just end up convincing a few people who are on the fence. One thing I want to point out is that I think the Yoga 11S might make a better tablet. That isn’t to say that the Yoga 13 didn’t make a good tablet (it did), it was just a little on the large side as far as slates go. The Yoga 11S fits very well in your hand, so I wouldn’t be surprised to see many people opting for tablet mode over the other configurations."
