= Lenovo IdeaPad U310 =

IdeaPad U310
- Developer: Lenovo
- Product family: IdeaPad
- Type: Ultrabook
- Released: 2012
- Operating system: Microsoft Windows
- CPU: Intel Core U Series
- Predecessor: Ideapad U300s

The Lenovo IdeaPad U310 is an Ultrabook-class notebook computer released in 2012. It is the successor to the Lenovo U300s.

The U310 has an aluminum-slab design with an island keyboard and a large touchpad.

== Hardware specifications ==
Christopher Null of Wired wrote, "Surprisingly, the U310 I reviewed performed almost identically in benchmark tests to the U300s I reviewed in November. That’s interesting, because the prior machine featured a 256GB SSD, and the U310 features a slow, 5400rpm 500GB traditional hard drive. It seems the faster CPU and slower hard drive manage to cancel each other out in the end. At about 4 hours, 20 minutes of video playback, even battery life is almost the same as it was last time around."

The U310 has a 13.3-inch 1366x768 resolution screen. The U310 has two USB 3.0 ports and one USB 2.0 port, an HDMI port, a wired Ethernet port, and an SD card slot.

== Issues ==
=== Wireless connectivity issues ===
Many owners reported poor wireless connectivity, a fact later acknowledged by Lenovo, and allegedly affecting all U310 and U410 models built prior to 23 July 2012. Lenovo suggested that users affected by the issue send their Ultrabook to customer support, however no official recall campaign was issued and malfunctioning units in stock were still sold internationally. After the repair, some users still reported the same issue.

However, despite the statement above, reports continue to come in of laptops manufactured after the date mentioned having the same wireless problem.

Lenovo is in the process of settling a class-action lawsuit to either repair the faulty laptops, refund $100, or give a $250 voucher towards another laptop purchase.

=== Cracking case and hinge ===
A number of users throughout the world have reported that the hinges of their Ideapad U310 notebooks were popped out and sometimes cracking sounds could be heard after half of a year or one year's normal usage. So far, Lenovo refused to acknowledge this problem and tried to charge customers for replacing the whole screen, which almost costs as much as a new U310. No official recall campaign was issued.

== Reviews ==
A review in Wired praised the U310 for its "awesome value," "solid performance," and sturdiness while complaining about the screen quality and lack of keyboard backlighting.
