= IdeaPad Flex =

2-in-1 laptop line by Lenovo

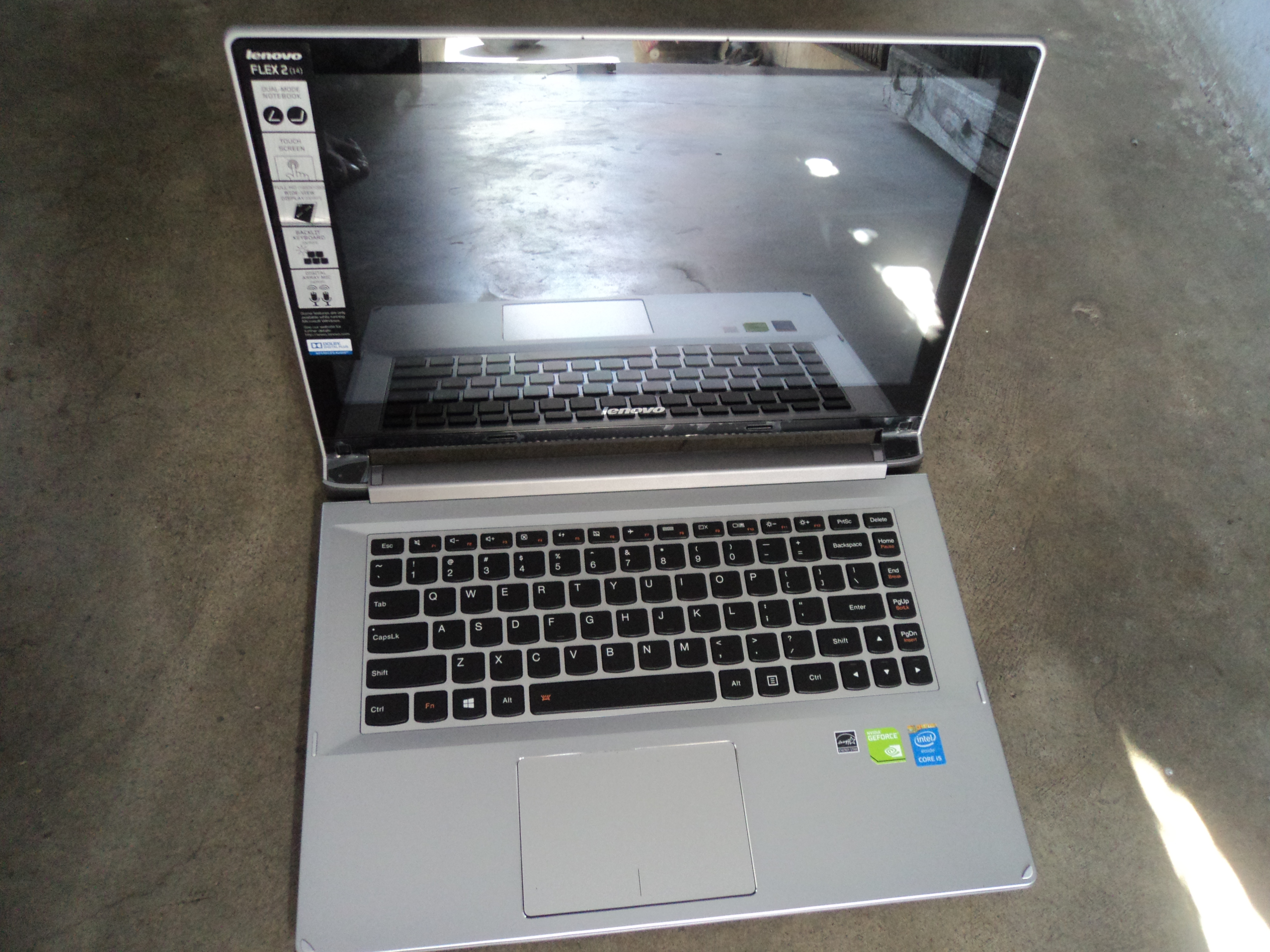
- Developer: Lenovo
- Manufacturer: Lenovo
- Type: 2-in-1 PC
- Released: 2013; 13 years ago
- Operating system: Windows
- Marketing target: Consumer / Home purpose
- Related: Lenovo Yoga, Lenovo Flex 10

The Lenovo IdeaPad Flex is a discontinued 2-in-1-laptop line by Lenovo. Unlike the Lenovo IdeaPad Yoga line of devices, the keyboard does not completely bend back entirely to allow use as a tablet, it is only a dual-mode laptop. Its keyboard rotates behind the display in order to put the device into "stand mode." Stand mode brings the user closer to the screen for watching videos and using touch-enabled apps and removes the visual distraction from the keyboard. The Lenovo IdeaPad Flex line has been discontinued according to the Lenovo PSREF.

== Models ==
=== Current lines ===
==== IdeaPad Flex 3 ====
Lenovo IdeaPad Flex 3
- Also known as: IdeaPad Flex 3
- Developer: Lenovo
- Manufacturer: Lenovo
- Type: 2-in-1 PC
- Operating system: Windows 10
- CPU: Intel Celeron N4020; AMD Athlon
- Storage: 128GB
- Display: 11.6 in (29 cm)
- Sound: Two speakers
- Input: 1 HDMI port 1 USB 3.0 port Headphone jack 1 USB 2.0 port Mini SD card reader
- Camera: Yes
- Touchpad: Yes
- Power: Non-removable battery

The Lenovo IdeaPad Flex 3 is an affordable, ultra-portable 2-in-1 convertible laptop available in sizes ranging from 11.6 to 15.6 inches, running either Chrome OS or Windows. It includes a 360-degree hinge that allows it to switch between multiple modes. The device is typically sold with Intel Celeron, Intel Pentium, or MediaTek processors, along with 4GB–8GB of RAM and 64GB–256GB of storage, making it suitable for everyday light tasks.

==== IdeaPad Flex 5 ====
Lenovo IdeaPad Flex 5
- Also known as: IdeaPad Flex 5
- Developer: Lenovo
- Manufacturer: Lenovo
- Type: 2-in-1 PC
- Operating system: Windows 10
- CPU: Intel Core i3 AMD Ryzen 5 5500U
- Storage: 256GB
- Display: 14.0 in (36 cm); 15.6 in (40 cm)
- Sound: Two speakers
- Input: 1 HDMI port USB Type-C; 2 USB 3.0 ports Headphone jack 4-in-1 Card Reader (SD, SDHC, SDXC, MMC); Fingerprint reader
- Camera: Yes
- Touchpad: Yes
- Power: Non-removable battery

The Lenovo IdeaPad Flex 5 is a mid-range 2-in-1 convertible laptop designed for everyday productivity, schoolwork, and light creative tasks. It features a 360-degree hinge that allows it to switch between laptop, tablet, tent, and stand modes, along with a touchscreen display typically available in 14-inch or 16-inch sizes. The device is commonly powered by AMD Ryzen or Intel Core processors, with 8GB–16GB of RAM and 256GB–1TB SSD storage. With integrated graphics, solid battery life, and useful features like Wi-Fi 6, USB-C connectivity, and optional stylus support, it offers a good balance of performance, portability, and versatility for daily use.

==== IdeaPad Flex 6 ====
Lenovo IdeaPad Flex 6
- Also known as: IdeaPad Flex 6
- Developer: Lenovo
- Manufacturer: Lenovo
- Type: 2-in-1 PC
- Operating system: Windows 10
- CPU: Intel Core i3 AMD Ryzen 5 5500U
- Storage: 128GB
- Display: 14.0 in (36 cm)
- Graphics: Intel UHD Graphics 620
- Sound: Harman speakers with Dolby Audio Premium
- Input: 1 HDMI port USB Type-C; 2 USB 3.0 ports Headphone jack 4-in-1 Card Reader (SD, SDHC, SDXC, MMC); Fingerprint reader
- Camera: Yes
- Touchpad: Yes
- Power: Non-removable battery

The Lenovo IdeaPad Flex 6 is a mid-range 2-in-1 convertible laptop designed for everyday productivity and entertainment. It features a 14-inch Full HD touchscreen with a 360-degree hinge that allows it to switch between laptop, tablet, tent, and stand modes. The device is typically powered by 8th-generation Intel Core processors with around 8GB of RAM and SSD storage, providing smooth performance for daily tasks like browsing, streaming, and office work.

Short-living line with two screen options: 14" and 11".

=== Early lines ===
==== IdeaPad Flex 10 ====
Lenovo IdeaPad Flex 10
- Also known as: IdeaPad Flex 10
- Developer: Lenovo
- Manufacturer: Lenovo
- Type: 2-in-1 PC
- Released: 2014
- Operating system: Microsoft Windows
- CPU: Intel Atom
- Storage: 320GB
- Display: 10.1 in (26 cm)
- Sound: Two speakers
- Input: 1 HDMI port 1 USB 3.0 port Headphone jack 1 USB 2.0 port
- Camera: Yes
- Touchpad: Yes
- Power: Non-removable battery

The Lenovo IdeaPad Flex 10 is a compact and affordable 2-in-1 convertible laptop designed for basic everyday use. It features a 10.1-inch touchscreen display and a hinge that can rotate up to about 300 degrees, allowing it to switch between laptop and stand modes. The device is typically powered by Intel Celeron or Pentium processors, with 2GB–4GB of RAM and 320GB–500GB of hard-drive storage. Lightweight and portable, it runs Windows and is best suited for simple tasks such as web browsing, streaming, and document work.

The Lenovo IdeaPad Flex 10 is dual-mode laptop with a 10-inch screen. It gets its name from its lid that can fold back flat and then around 300 degrees.

The 2014's Flex 10's has display features multitouch capability and has a resolution of 1366×768. Buyers can select configurations with the quad-core (Pentium N3510, or Celeron N2910), or the dual-core (Celeron N2810, or Celeron N2805) Intel CPUs. The Pentium configuration can hold up to 4 gigabytes of RAM and the Celeron configurations can hold 2 gigabytes. The Flex 10 shares the same basic ports and design as the Flex 15 and the IdeaPad A10.

According to a review from NDTV Gadgets, "It's clear that Lenovo allocated most of this device's cost to its more visible features. In terms of functionality, it is best thought of as a modern-day netbook: good enough for surfing the Web, creating basic documents and watching movies now and then, but not suitable for any serious work."

==== IdeaPad Flex 14 ====
Design and performance - Like other Lenovo devices such as the Yoga, the Flex has a matte, smooth lid that tapers slightly at the sides with a Lenovo logo in the upper left corner. Some models have orange accents, a feature often found in Lenovo's designs. Rubber bumpers prevent the screen from being rotated beyond 300 degrees and prevent the keyboard from contacting the table.

It has a display with a resolution of 1920 x 1080 and ten-point multitouch capability. Models with Intel Core i5 and i7 processors are available. 8 gigabytes of RAM comes standard and up to 16 gigabytes. Storage is available from 256 gigabytes PCIe SSD. An Nvidia GeForce MX130 video card (Nvidia Geforce GT 820 M in the 2014 version)with 2 gigabytes of video RAM is an option. A 0.9 megapixel webcam is included. 802.11 ac Wi-Fi and Bluetooth 4.1 standards are all supported. It comes with a Qualcomm Atheros Internet Card. Ports include HDMI, two USB 3.0 and one USB-C. An SD card reader allows for expandable storage. (Two USB 2 Ports and one USB 3 port with HDMI AND and SD Card reader were present in the older versions) A 45 watt-hour battery provides up to seven hours of unplugged use. The model with an 8th-gen Intel Core i5-8250U CPU and 8GB of RAM achieved a score of 12,130 points on Geekbench 4.

The Flex 14 runs Windows 10. It includes a Dolby Atmos app, Microsoft Office, McAfee 30 days trial, Lenovo Vantage and such other apps from the Microsoft Store.

Reviews - In a review for Laptop Mag, Shaun Lucas wrote, "The Botton Line: With its speedy performance, strong sound and solid design, the $809 Lenovo IdeaPad Flex 6 is an attractive and affordable 2-in-1." He praised the discrete graphics but noted that the laptop is not ideal for gaming on the go due to its eight hour battery life and low (300 nitts) screen brightness.

PC MAG praised its hinge design, battery life, keyboard, and 10-point touch screen.

=== IdeaPad Flex 2 15 ===
Lenovo IdeaPad Flex 2 15
- Also known as: IdeaPad Flex 2 15
- Developer: Lenovo
- Manufacturer: Lenovo
- Type: 2-in-1 PC
- Released: 2014
- Operating system: Windows 8.1
- CPU: Intel Core i3, i5 and i7
- Storage: 1TB
- Display: 15.6 in (40 cm)
- Graphics: Intel HD Graphics 4400
- Sound: Two speakers
- Input: 1 HDMI port RJ-45 Ethernet; 1 USB 3.0 port Headphone jack 4-in-1 Card Reader (SD, SDHC, SDXC, MMC); 2 USB 2.0 ports DVD drive
- Camera: Yes
- Touchpad: Yes
- Power: Non-removable battery

=== IdeaPad Flex 2 14 ===
Lenovo IdeaPad Flex 2 14
- Also known as: IdeaPad Flex 2 14
- Developer: Lenovo
- Manufacturer: Lenovo
- Type: 2-in-1 PC
- Released: 2014
- Operating system: Windows 8.1
- CPU: Intel Core i3, i5 and i7
- Storage: 1TB
- Display: 14.1 in (36 cm)
- Graphics: NVIDIA Graphics
- Sound: Two speakers
- Input: 1 HDMI port RJ-45 Ethernet; 1 USB 3.0 port Headphone jack 4-in-1 Card Reader (SD, SDHC, SDXC, MMC); 2 USB 2.0 ports
- Camera: Yes
- Touchpad: Yes
- Power: Non-removable battery

== See also ==
- IdeaPad
- Lenovo Yoga
