= Lenovo Flex 10 =

The Lenovo Flex 10 is a flexible dual-mode laptop computer with a 10.1" screen released in 2014.

== Launch ==
The Flex 10 was released in 2014. It was launched with a starting price of $550 in the United States.

== Specifications and performance ==
The Flex 10 has 10.1-inch screen and supports ten-point multitouch in order to take advantage of Windows 8's touch-enabled features, including gestures. The screen rotates up to 300 degrees in order to support different use modes. Its resolution is 1366 by 768. The display is powered by Intel integrated graphics. The Flex 10's keyboard lays flat against the surface the device is sitting on when it is in "stand mode." A 720P webcam sits above the screen. The Flex 10 is 0.68 inches thick and weighs 2.6 pounds. Models with 4GB and 8GB of memory are available. There are options for both standard Pentium-class and Celeron-class processors from Intel. Hard drives are available with capacities up to 500GB. The Flex 10 includes both Bluetooth 4.0 and Wi-Fi. Ports included one USB 3.0 port, one USB 2.0 port, an HDMI output, and a jack for audio input and output.

The Flex 10 includes software called "Lenovo Energy Manager" that minimises power usage while maximizing battery durability. The Flex 10 includes another piece of software called "Veriface Pro" that uses the built-in camera and facial recognition to log users in without passwords.

== Reviews ==
Writing for NDTV, Jamshed Avari wrote, "As it stands, the Lenovo Flex 10 is a fascinating product but not one we can see a strong target market for. It seems like just another Lenovo form-factor experiment. Pick it up if you love the looks and don't think a tablet would suit your needs..."

A review in the Hindustan Times stated, "The Flex 10 is a device for those who like the feel of a traditional keyboard as well as the thrill of a touchscreen. Thanks to its compact design, it can be carried around easily. However, owing to its low configuration, you will not be able to use resource-hogging software like Photoshop. The notebook is perfect for browsing, responding to mails, making presentations, doing some typing, playing games and watching movies while travelling."

== See also ==
- HP Envy x2
