= Lenovo Yoga 2 Pro =

Hybrid laptop computer and tablet

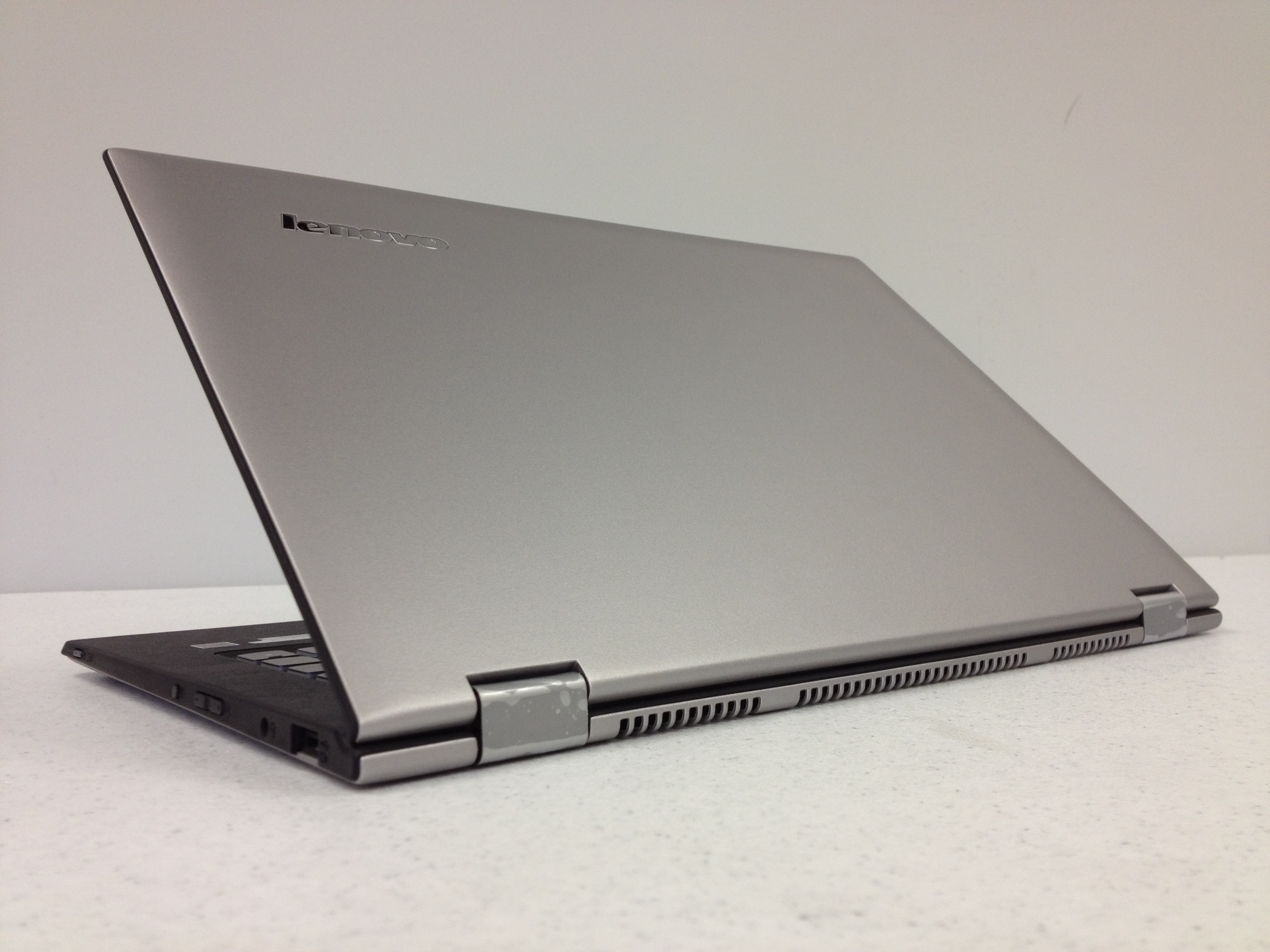
- Lenovo Yoga 2 Pro Silver Gray Model
- Manufacturer: Lenovo Group Ltd.
- Type: Laptop/Notebook/Ultrabook
- Released: October 2013
- Operating system: Windows 8.1 (upgradable to Windows 10)
- Sound: Built-in stereo speakers Built-in microphone
- Website: shop.lenovo.com

The Lenovo IdeaPad Yoga 2 Pro is an Ultrabook-class convertible device that can be used as both a tablet and laptop computer in the IdeaPad series. Lenovo unveiled the Yoga 2 Pro at the 2013 IFA in Berlin, Germany. It went on sale in the United States in October 2013. It comes in two colors, silver gray and clementine orange, and is designed for flexibility—allowing the user to use it in a variety of situations. Because of the durable hinge that allows the screen to swivel 360 degrees, the Yoga 2 Pro is able to fully utilize Windows 8 and its emphasis on touchscreen integration. The Yoga 2 Pro is the first laptop to earn a Green Mark certification from TUV that recognizes Lenovo for environmentally friendly manufacturing processes and low energy consumption.

== Design and Performance ==
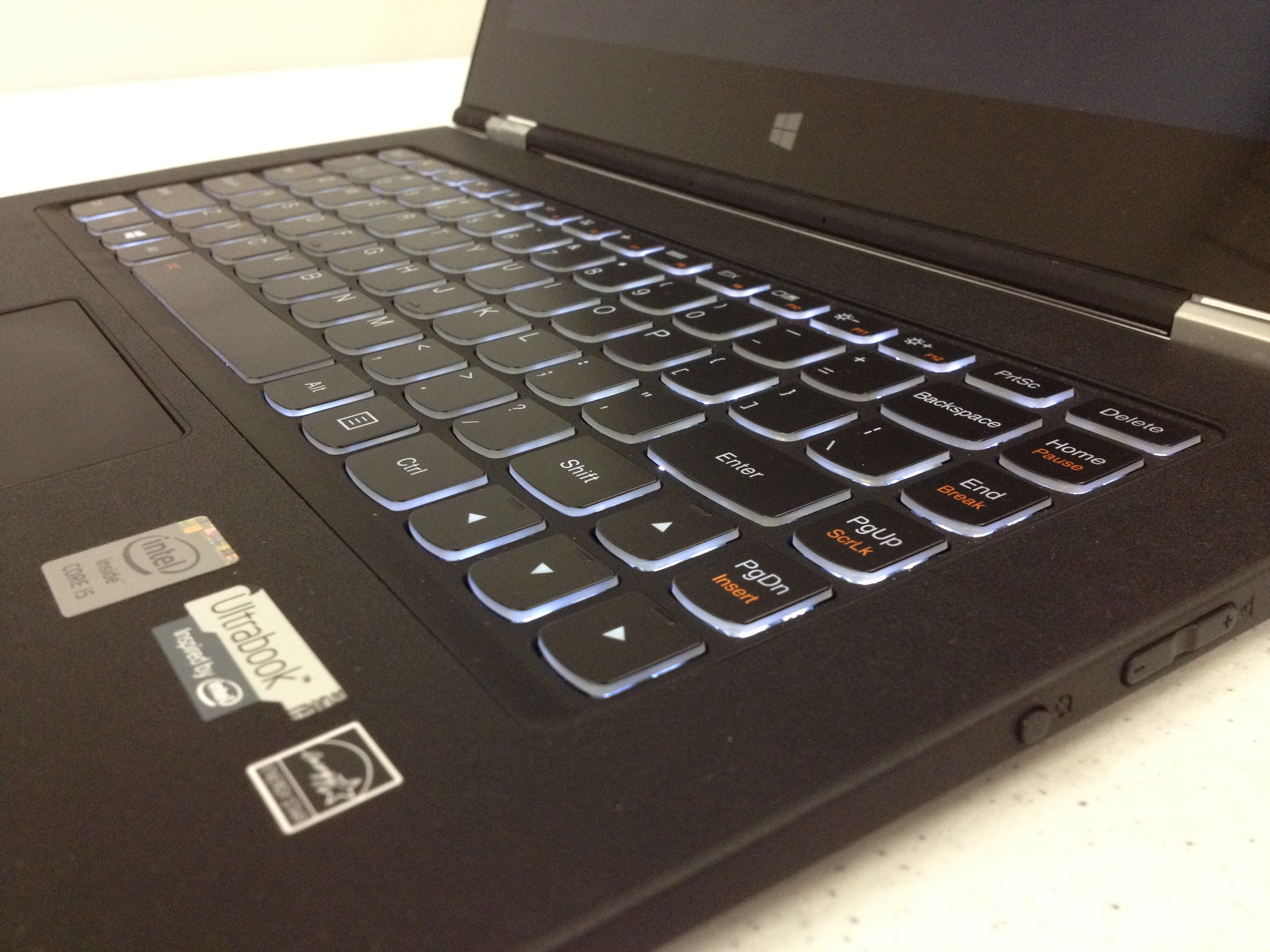
The Yoga 2 Pro's backlit AccuType keyboard

The Yoga 2 Pro is an Ultrabook-class device. It weighs 3.1 lb (1.4 kg), is 0.61 inch thick and has tapered edges, giving it an appearance more like a conventional ultrabook laptop vs the earlier model's "book-like" symmetrical design. The Yoga 2 Pro features a 360-Degree Flip-and-Fold design that encompasses four modes—laptop, stand, tablet, and tent mode and has a subtle rubber trim around the edge of its top half in order to prevent slipping on hard surfaces when in tent mode. It comes with a backlit AccuType keyboard and features stereo speakers with Dolby Home Theater. Unlike earlier Yoga products, the home button is now a touch-key on the bottom center of the display. Lenovo moved the power button away from the front and to the side in order to prevent accidental key presses.

The base package comes an Intel Core i3 4010U, 4 gigabytes of RAM and 128 gigabytes solid state drive with configurations up to an Intel Core i7 4500U, 8 gigabytes of RAM and 512 gigabyte solid state drive. The 13.3-inch screen uses in-plane switching (IPS) technology and has a QHD+ (3,200 × 1,800) 10-point multitouch display with a brightness of 350 nits. The Yoga 2 Pro come with Intel Wireless Display technology in order to conform to the Ultrabook specification. The ports it comes with are a USB 3.0, a USB 2.0, a micro-HDMI, a 2-in-1 card reader, and a combo jack. Lenovo claims a battery life of up to nine hours.

The Yoga 2 Pro comes pre-installed with Phone Companion, Camera Man, Photo Touch, and Chef apps. It includes a software called Lenovo Picks that detects the position of the device and recommends apps for each mode. For example, in stand mode with the screen facing outward, it assumes that you might want to use Skype or Netflix. Phone Companion is a utility that copies content such as documents and hyperlinks and sends them to your phone as a text message and Lenovo Photo Touch and Lenovo Camera Man are included for taking and editing pictures. Lenovo Chef is an included recipe app with motion and voice control.

== Specifications ==
Tech Specs
Description	Lenovo Yoga 2 Pro				
Processor	4th Gen Intel Core i7-4510U (2.00 GHz 1600 MHz 4MB)	4th Gen Intel Core i7-4500U (1.80 GHz 1600 MHz 4MB)	4th Gen Intel Core i5-4210U (1.70 GHz 1600 MHz 3MB)	4th Gen Intel Core i5-4200U (1.60 GHz 1600 MHz 3MB)	4th Gen Intel Core i3-4010U (1.70 GHz 1600 MHz 3MB)
Operating System	Windows 8.1 Pro 64			Windows 8.1 64	
Memory	Up to 8GB DDR3L 1600 MHz, on-board two-channel (4GB/8GB)				
Display/Resolution	13.3" high-resolution QHD+ (3200 × 1800)		13.3" high-resolution FHD (1920 × 1080)		IPS display with 10-point multitouch technology
Dimensions (W × D × H)	12.99" × 8.66" × 0.61" (33cm x 22cm x 1.55cm)				
Weight	3.06 lbs, 1.39 kg				
Camera	720p HD webcam				
Storage	128GB / 256GB / 512GB (SSD)				
Integrated Communications	Intel Wireless-N 7260 802.11 b/g/n, Bluetooth 4.0			Intel Dual Band Wireless 7260 802.11 b/g/n/ac, Bluetooth 4.0	
Connectors	1 × USB 3.0, 1 × USB 2.0, Audio Combo Jack (headphone and microphone), micro HDMI-out				
Sound	Integrated stereo speakers with Dolby			Home Theater	
Graphics	Integrated Intel HD Graphics 4400				
Battery	Up to 9 hrs Windows 8 Idle @ 150 nits			Up to 6 hrs FHD playback @ 150 nits	
Case color	silver gray			clementine orange	

== Reviews ==
Dan Ackerman of CNET wrote, "I'm pleased to see a backlit keyboard, and in our brief hands-on time with the Yoga 2, it felt like a nice upgrade from the previous version, and it's still one of the slickest-looking ultrabooks out there, even without its hybrid properties."

Sasha Muller of PC Pro wrote, "There's no question that the Yoga 2 Pro is a triumph. It's lighter, stronger, prettier and all-round better than before. And, somehow, Lenovo has managed to deliver all this for only £1,000. We have to be realistic: the high-DPI display is more of a limitation than a benefit at this time, but at this price, we’d be more than willing to put up with the occasional annoyance. It's a remarkable achievement."

The Yoga 2 Pro also been criticized for a relatively short battery life, especially when compared to other 2nd-half-2013 Ultrabook releases that saw much prolonged battery life when switching from Intel's 3rd-generation "Ivy Bridge" to 4th-generation "Haswell" chips. While the Yoga 2 Pro's battery has a higher capacity than the Yoga 13, it uses up more power due to having to display more pixels (3,200 × 1,800 versus 1,600 × 900), thus battery life has not improved much.

Writing for the Supersite for Windows, Paul Thurrott stated, "Where the Yoga 2 Pro excels is in its multiple usage possibilities, and while it is absolutely an Ultrabook first, its ability to transform really does set it apart. And that I'm even comparing this device head-to-head with the ThinkPad X1 Carbon is telling: this is a truly versatile machine. "Battery life is impressive and is roughly on par with that of the X1 Carbon. I routinely get 7 or more hours of life, and it withstands cross-country flights and long train rides with ease, using my typical combination of work (writing, image processing) and entertainment (videos)."

Writing about the display, Thurrott stated, "...I spend most of my time in the desktop. And super-high-res simply doesn't work in that environment if you run certain poorly-written applications regularly as I do. Were I to stick to Windows 8.1's "Modern" environment, this wouldn't be an issue. Likewise, if you use well-written desktop applications exclusively, you'll find that the Yoga 2 Pro's screen is best in class, and that the desktop scaling functionality works just fine. In fact, better than fine: The text on onscreen controls is so crisp it looks fake."

== Yoga 2 (standard version) ==
In 2014, Lenovo announced the IdeaPad Yoga 2 (minus the "Pro"), which will be less expensive, but still maintain the flexible convertible hinge. It will be available in 11-inch and 13-inch sizes.

The 11" model starts at $529, weighs 1.3 kg (2.9 pounds) and is 1.7 cm (0.67 inch) thick. The starting configuration is a quad-core Intel Pentium CPU and 500GB hard drive.

The $999 13-inch Yoga 2 weighs 1.6 kg (3.5 pounds) and is slightly thicker than the 11-inch model, with a 1,920x1,080 panel, 500GB hard drive, and backlit keyboard. The CPU can be upgraded to a fourth-gen Intel Core i5 CPU, and solid-state drive (SSD) storage is optional.

A 13.3" limited edition silver non-tack top lid and base were trialed because of issues with the original case causing discolouration, wear and tear. Ultimately, this solution worked but was never mass produced, making this edition a sought after laptop.

== See also ==
- Lenovo Yoga Tablet 2 Pro based on Atom Z3745 processor
