= IdeaPad Vibe =

Laptop computer by Lenovo

- Developer: Lenovo
- Type: Laptop
- Released: AMD: October 2026; Snapdragon: November 2026
- Introductory price: US$699
- Operating system: Microsoft Windows
- Memory: AMD: 8–32 GB; Snapdragon: 8–24 GB
- Storage: Up to 1 TB
- Display: 14-inch: 1920 × 1200 px 15-inch: 2.1K resolution Both models: IPS or OLED technology at 120 Hz; Optional touchscreen
- Camera: 5 MP webcam with privacy shutter
- Connectivity: 2 × USB-A; 2 × USB-C; 1 × 3.5 mm audio jack; 1 × microSD card reader; 1 × HDMI port; Wi-Fi 7; Bluetooth 5.4
- Power: AMD: 50 or 65 Wh battery Snapdragon: 50 Wh
- Dimensions: 14-inch: 313.6 × 224.8 × 14.9 mm (12.35 × 8.85 × 0.59 in); 15-inch: 343.6 × 242.2 × 14.9 mm (13.53 × 9.54 × 0.59 in)
- Weight: 14-inch: 2.87 lb (1.30 kg); 15-inch: 3.31 lb (1.50 kg)

The Lenovo IdeaPad Vibe is a laptop in the IdeaPad series that is made by Lenovo. It was announced at IFA 2026 in Berlin, Germany, on September 3, 2026. The IdeaPad Vibe runs on Microsoft's Windows operating system and comes either with an AMD's Ryzen AI 400 chip or a Qualcomm's Snapdragon X chip. The IdeaPad Vibe with an AMD chip will be released in October 2026, while the Snapdragon-based models will be released in November 2026.

== Overview ==
The IdeaPad Vibe was announced on September 3, 2026, at IFA 2026 in Berlin, Germany.

The IdeaPad Vibe comes in these chips: the AMD Ryzen AI 400 or a Qualcomm Snapdragon X chip. The models with AMD will be released in October 2026, while the models with Snapdragon will be launched in November 2026. The release date of a model with an Intel chip is unspecified.

At a starting price of US$699, sources have said that the IdeaPad Vibe competed primarily against Apple's MacBook Neo and Dell's XPS 13.

The Vibe comes with 8 GB of RAM, which can be upgraded to 24 GB for the Snapdragon model or 32 GB for the AMD model.

== Specifications ==
=== Design ===
The IdeaPad Vibe is available in plastic and metal variants. Lenovo consulted with Pantone to make the laptop be available in seven colors: Dreamy Violet, Spicy Gold, Zen Green, Chill Blue, Radiant Coral, Moody Blue, and Lowkey Grey.

=== Hardware ===
The IdeaPad Vibe features display sizes of 14 and 15 inches (360 and 380 mm). The 14-inch model has a display resolution of 1920 × 1200 pixels, while Lenovo said the 15-inch has "2.1K resolution". All models have a 5 MP webcam with a privacy shutter and Windows Hello.

The Vibe has two speakers, two USB-A ports, two USB-C ports, a 3.5 mm audio jack, a microSD card reader, and an HDMI port. All models use Wi-Fi 7 and Bluetooth 5.4. The AMD model has either a 50 or 65 Wh battery, while the Snapdragon model only has a 50 Wh battery.
