= Lenovo IdeaPad Yoga 13 =

Convertible laptop

- Also known as: Yoga 13
- Developer: Lenovo
- Manufacturer: Lenovo
- Product family: IdeaPad
- Type: Ultrabook
- Introductory price: $1,049.00
- Operating system: Windows 8 Upgradable to Windows 10 or Windows 11
- CPU: Intel Core i5 or Intel Core i7
- Memory: 4 or 8 GB
- Storage: 128 or 256 GB SSD
- Display: 13.3" HD+IPS capacitive multitouch display 900p
- Graphics: Intel HD Graphics 4000
- Input: USB 2.0, USB 3.0, SD, HDMI, MMC
- Camera: 1MP 720p integrated webcam
- Touchpad: 10-point multitouch
- Power: Battery
- Dimensions: 13.1 x 8.9 x 0.67 inches
- Weight: 3.4 lbs
- Successor: Lenovo Yoga 2 Pro
- Website: www.lenovo.com/products/us/laptop/ideapad/yoga/yoga-13/

The Lenovo IdeaPad Yoga 13 is a convertible laptop created by Lenovo and first announced at the International CES 2012 in January. The Yoga 13 gets its name from its ability to take on various form factors due to its screen being mounted on a special two-way hinge.

== Launch ==
The 13-inch Yoga was released by Lenovo on Oct. 26, 2012. Best Buy released an alternative version of the Yoga 13 with an Intel Core i5 processor (vs. Lenovo's base model's i3 processor) and no Microsoft Office (whereas Lenovo's base model includes Microsoft Office). Its smaller cousin, Yoga 11, which runs Windows RT (as opposed to the Yoga 13, running Windows 8), was released in December 2012.

== Design ==
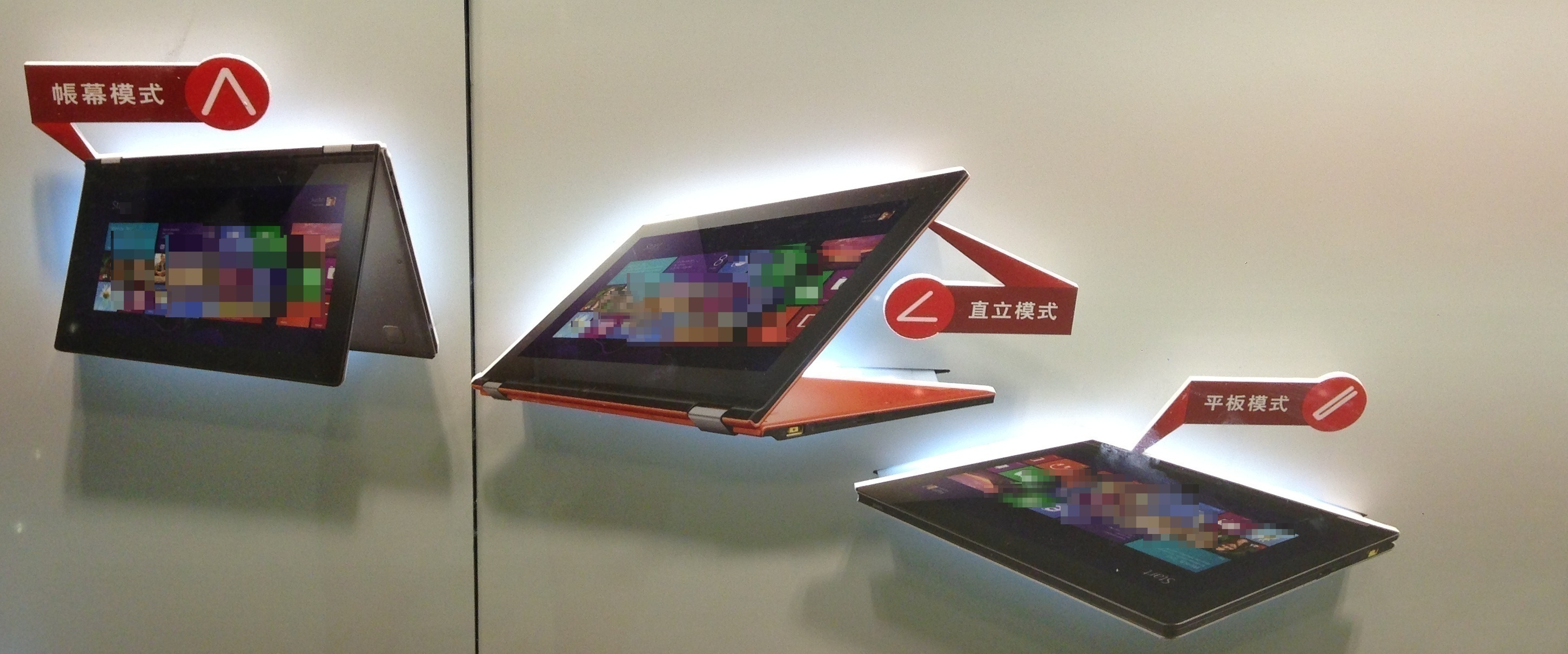
Various configurations possible with the Yoga 11S and Yoga 13

The name "Yoga" is a reference to the unit's design that makes use of a double hinge to allow four different configurations in order to provide maximum flexibility to the user.

The Yoga 13 is 17mm thick. The Yoga's hybrid design was achieved through the use of a special patented hinge that allows the keyboard to flip flush to the back of the display. The Yoga 13's hinge allows the device to be held partway open so it can be set upright on a flat surface as a display. When the keyboard is folded away the computer functions as a touch-controlled tablet. Much of the Yoga 13's usability as a tablet is made possible through Microsoft's Windows 8.

The Yoga 13 was compared to the IdeaPad U300s ultrabook, in terms of appearance: the aluminum look, shape and size. However, the wrist rest on the Yoga 13 has plastic with a texture similar to leather. This wrist rest is also elevated, allowing the Yoga 13 to be placed, keyboard-down on a table, without users "worrying too much about damaging the keys".

The Yoga 13 has a chiclet-style keyboard that has been the subject of criticism. In his review for Popular Science, Dan Nosowitz wrote about the keyboard, "The one big fault, oddly, is the keyboard. Oddly, because Lenovo is kind of known for making ugly but incredibly usable keyboards. Yet the Yoga 13 has a half-sized backspace and right shift key, which means I mistyped a lot. When you're in tablet mode, there's the Windows 8 on-screen keyboard, which, due to the Yoga 13's huge screen (compared to other tablets), is great. You can actually use all ten fingers on the keyboard, rather than the two-fingers-and-a-thumb strategy you'd use on an iPad."

The reason for the convertible tablet design was explained by Yang Yuanqing, chairman and CEO of Lenovo. He said, "Whether a notebook that bends and folds, or an all-in-one that puts the 'wide' into wide-angle, today's announcements reflect our focus on delivering the inspirational innovations that consumers are looking for."

The Yoga 13 has been described as being thicker and heavier than most tablet devices at 17mm thin and a 13.3 inch screen. However, PC World indicated that it was thinner and easier to carry than most convertible notebooks. Engadget shared the same opinion, indicating that it was thick by the standards of a tablet, but slim for a laptop-tablet convertible. Among several changes that contribute to the slim design is an altered power port.

Engadget also praised the build quality and the IPS display. The hinge was designed to weather 25,000 open/close cycles and the back covered was described as having a "soft, tactile finish". The display offered wide viewing angles and vibrant colors. It was also indicated to be responsive, to taps, swipes, and up to ten-finger touchscreen input.

== Specifications ==
The Yoga 13's capacitive touch display allows for up to 10-point touch control. The Yoga 13 is powered by an Intel Chief River platform, using an Ivy Bridge processor, has 4 GB or 8 GB of RAM, and SSD with 128 GB or 256 GB.

The battery life of the Yoga 13 is estimated at eight hours. After testing the Yoga 13's battery life TechRadar said, "Our only real concern is that the battery life is squarely average. In our Battery Eater test, which maxes out the system until the battery dies, we only clocked 177 minutes, which is short of the 200-minute gold standard. This said, in normal day-to-day usage, we experienced closer to six to eight hours of life, depending on the screen brightness and CPU saturation."

The Yoga 13 makes use of a 13.3-inch display with a resolution of 1600 x 900. The display uses an IPS panel in order to provide wide viewing angles and maintain the thin profile of the Yoga 13.

The Yoga 13 has 720p front-facing webcam. It has one USB 3.0 port and one USB 2.0 port, an HDMI output, a memory card reader, and a combo jack for audio input and output.

== Reviews ==
A reviewer for ZDNet wrote, "The Yoga 13 looks like a fit for those primarily wanting an Ultrabook, with occasional use as a tablet. I’m not sure 3.4 pounds makes for a comfortable tablet experience for very long. It will likely get more extended use as a laptop with a touchscreen."

In an editors' review, CNET stated that, "The Yoga works best as a full-time laptop and part-time tablet, because when it's folded back into a slate, you still have the keyboard pointing out from the back of the system. Although the keyboard and touch pad are deactivated in this mode, it's still not ideal. Plus, despite the hype, Windows 8 is still not a 100-percent tablet-friendly OS, and there are some frustrations that span all the Windows 8 tablet-style devices we've tested. The Yoga certainly seems to be everyone's choice for a great Windows 8 ambassador -- both Microsoft and Intel have touted it as a best-in-class example, and Best Buy is currently featuring it in a television ad."

In a review for Popular Science Dan Nosowitz wrote, "For most users, in 2012, I think an ultrabook is the way to go. Small, fast, sturdy, and light--that's what's important now. If your media is mostly in the cloud--you use Radio or Spotify, Netflix, Hulu, Google Docs, any of a million cloud photo services--then this is perfect (though there's some weirdness with the 128GB SSD; you only have about 50GB available, and I'm not sure why). It's light enough to throw in a backpack, battery life reached more than five hours with moderate-to-heavy use, and, importantly and unusually for a Windows machine, the Yoga is actually fun to use. The hinge seems like a gimmick, but I actually think it's great, and whizzing through the colorful tablet mode is futuristic and cool."

In a review for TechRadar George Jones wrote, "With the hyper-flexible Yoga, Lenovo has the most, or at least the first, meaningful intangible. For now, it's hard to imagine anyone topping a device that can be favorably compared to other laptops as well as tablet convertibles."

In its review of the Yoga 13, Trusted Reviews writes, "Like most of the Windows 8 convertible tablet/laptops we’ve looked at, the Lenovo IdeaPad Yoga 13 isn’t quite the perfect hybrid. However, if you regard it as a touch-screen Ultrabook with a cool twist, it certainly succeeds. It’s generally well-built, looks stylish and feels great, and its flexible hinge gives you lots of different usage scenarios. While no match for the ThinkPad range, its keyboard is pleasant enough to type on and its touchpad is lovely, while that 1,600 x 900 IPS screen supports 10-finger touch. It also has plenty of power under the hood, and backs this with decent battery life."

== Awards ==
When it was showcased at CES 2012, the IdeaPad Yoga 13 won the "Best Ultrabook" award.

== See also ==
- IdeaPad tablets
- Lenovo IdeaPad Yoga 11
