= Lenovo IdeaPad U300s =

Laptop model

The Lenovo U300s is a laptop model produced by Lenovo as part of the Ultrabook family.

== Features ==
The Lenovo U300s features Intel Rapid Start Technology which allows for faster start-up times while conserving battery life. This technology allows the U300s to start almost instantly. The U300s also makes use of m.2 SSDs instead of regular hard drives in order to improve start times. The U300s' battery can last for up to eight hours.

=== Design ===
The U300s weighs 1.58 kilograms and is only 18.3 mm thick. It measures 324mm in width and 216 in depth. As the case of the U300s does not use a tapered design it incorporates full-sized ports as opposed to the "mini" ports used on many other small laptops.

The U300s has an aluminum case with top and bottom panels in "Graphite Grey" with a silver body in between. As of February 2012 Lenovo has plans to release a "Clementine Orange" version of the U300s. The U300s has a small power brick that is slightly larger than a deck of playing cards.

=== Hardware specifications ===
The U300s includes a 13-inch display, an Intel U series Core i7 or i5 processor, an SSD with options for 128 or 256 GB of storage. The U300s makes use of Intel's HD Graphics 3000 integrated with the CPU, includes an HDMI port, and supports Intel's WiDi standard for wireless graphics.

The U300s features what Lenovo calls "one-button recovery." Pushing a button on the left side of the case allows the user to restore the computer to factory condition. The OS can be re-installed from the recovery partition.

== Reviews ==
The Computer Shopper wrote that the U300s "delivers on the Ultrabook promise of a take-anywhere laptop that doesn't compromise speed or battery life. But the Core i7 CPU and 256GB SSD in our test unit drives up the price too far for most users."

Jack Schofield, writing for ZDNet UK, stated, "The U300s is a convenient machine to carry around. It comes up from sleep in a couple of seconds, and the Flash-memory based SSD (solid state drive) means you start working very quickly. This has been one of the MacBook's advantages for the past decade, and it has taken PC manufacturers far too long to narrow the gap." Addressing some of the drawbacks of the U300s he writes, "As usual with ultraportable PCs, there are a few omissions, too. The U300s lacks an RJ-45 Ethernet port, which I frequently need in hotels, and an SD card slot, which I use all the time for copying files from my digital cameras and audio recorder. Also, there are only two USB ports, though one of these supports USB 3.0."

Riyad Emeran, writing for IT Reviews, wrote in his review of the U300s, "There's no shortage of great looking Ultrabook's on the market, with the likes of the Toshiba Z830 and Asus ZenBook UX31 also vying for your attention. But there is something a bit different about the Lenovo U300s. It feels slightly less indulgent and takes itself a little more seriously, making it potentially more attractive to the business user. It's not perfect, with the reduced size keys on the keyboard being the main bugbear, but you are getting a solid, well designed Ultrabook at a very reasonable price."

The U300s was described by Engadget as being "pared-down and tasteful." It was compared to the MacBook Air in terms of design since, like the Air, it was made from a single sheet of aluminum, and was indicated to be susceptible to scratches, despite the fact that the metal had been sandblasted and anodized. Engadget also criticized the U300s for the lack of a memory card slot, stating that, "it's the only Ultrabook we know of that doesn't have a memory card slot." The keyboard on the laptop received praise and was described as being sturdy and comfortable to type on. The glass touchpad was also received positively, with the reviewer stating that, "it has the best touchpad of any of the new Ultrabook's we've tested."
