= Lenovo IdeaPad Yoga 11 =

Hybrid laptop and tablet

The Lenovo IdeaPad Yoga 11 is a hybrid laptop/tablet Windows RT-based computer released in late 2012. The Yoga 11 gets its name from its ability to change form factors thanks to the two-way hinge used to mount its display. It was discontinued on July 17, 2013, due to the poor sales of Windows RT devices.

== Features ==
=== Design ===
The Yoga 11 and Yoga 13 computers get their name from their unique design that enables the devices to rotate their screen backwards to become tablet devices. According to PC Pro, "The hybrid design is immensely flexible. Prop the Yoga 11 up in 'tent mode', and the touchscreen can be angled just so. Lay the keyboard facing the desk, and the screen can be tilted back and forth while sturdy-feeling hinges keep the display from flopping backwards. Fold the screen all the way back, and hidden magnets hold it clamped shut against the underside, transforming it into a tablet." The Yoga 11 has a slim chassis with a matte orange exterior finish and an all-black interior that weighs 2.79 pounds. It has a full-size QWERTY keyboard. According to TechRadar, the "large, well-cushioned keys offer a far better experience than Microsoft Surface, and there's a large trackpad as well."

=== Specifications ===
The Yoga 11 is powered by a quad-core Nvidia Tegra 3 that runs at a maximum clock speed of 1.3 GHz and features an integrated graphics processor. The Tegra 3 is also found in numerous Android-based tablets. 2 GB of RAM comes standard. This relatively small amount of RAM is sufficient due to the reduced memory requirements of Windows RT applications. The Yoga 11 is sold with solid state drives in 32 GB and 64 GB capacities. The Yoga 11 runs the Windows RT operating system. Microsoft Office 2013 ships pre-installed. Like all Windows RT devices, the Yoga 11 cannot run software designed for earlier versions of Windows, only apps designed for the new Metro interface are compatible.

According to performance tests run by TechRadar using SunSpider and Peacekeeper benchmarking software, the Yoga 11 runs slightly slower than the Microsoft Surface RT, which uses the same processor. The Yoga 11 was able to run 9 hours and 32 minutes in battery tests, significantly outperforming the Microsoft Surface RT. In a test conducted by PC Pro the batteries took 11 hours and 58 minutes to run down.

The Yoga 11 has an 11.6-inch glossy screen that makes use of in-plane switching technology and runs at a resolution of 1366×768. The screen has a maximum brightness of only 344 nits, but has a measured contrast ratio of 1,146:1. There are two USB 2.0 ports, an SD card reader, a 3.5 mm headphone jack, and a standard HDMI output. There is a built-in 720p webcam.

=== System restore ===
Windows RT comes with an integrated system restore utility. It is also possible to create a USB recovery drive. An external USB recovery drive is essential in case the data on your hard disk has been compromised up to the point where the system can no longer boot from the hard drive. Reportedly the key combination to have the Lenovo Yoga 11 UEFI firmware boot an external USB drive is "Volume Up" plus the "Windows Key" directly below the screen.

== Reviews ==
In its review TechRadar stated, "The Lenovo IdeaPad Yoga 11 is a stylish, lightweight and durable laptop that neatly doubles as a tablet. At 11 inches, it's portable and thin enough to be used in tablet form, but like its bigger brother, having the keys on the reverse affecting your grip makes it far from ideal.If you're looking for a laptop form factor for work, which doubles as a tablet for basic apps and sofa surfing, then the Yoga 11 is worth serious consideration, although we'd advise you to head to your nearest PC superstore to give it the once over. It's not for everyone, and we'd primarily recommend it to someone looking for a small Windows 8 laptop who doesn't want to miss out on enjoying all the touchscreen goodness that Windows 8 has to offer."

In its review PC Pro wrote, "Place Windows 8 at the helm, and the Yoga 11 would be a tantalising prospect: after all, it’s an excellent laptop with a 12-hour battery life and useful tablet functions. With most Ultrabooks still struggling to push past the nine-hour mark under the lightest usage, the promise of a well-designed 1.19kg hybrid that lasts all day is incredibly attractive. Once you factor in the presence of Windows RT, however, the appeal of this hybrid swiftly wanes." PC Pro concludes by stating, "Don’t abandon hope yet, however: with Lenovo set to release a Windows 8, Intel-powered Yoga 11S sometime this year, we’d keep that credit card at the ready."

In its review of the Yoga 11, The Inquirer wrote, "The Lenovo Ideapad Yoga 11 has a very unique construction and in terms of design alone is perhaps one of our favourite hybrid devices out there now for this reason. It's an ultra-flexible laptop with the option to convert into various different modes, making it a close to ideal multimode device. Its HD display offers a good touchscreen experience as well as high display resolution for its size, and its keyboard performed well, too. However, we feel the Yoga 11 is severely held back by Windows RT, rendering it half as useful as it could be due to the lack of apps and application programs available to download onto it."
