= IdeaPad =

Line of consumer-oriented laptop computers by Lenovo

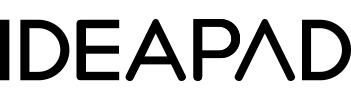
- Logo since 2022

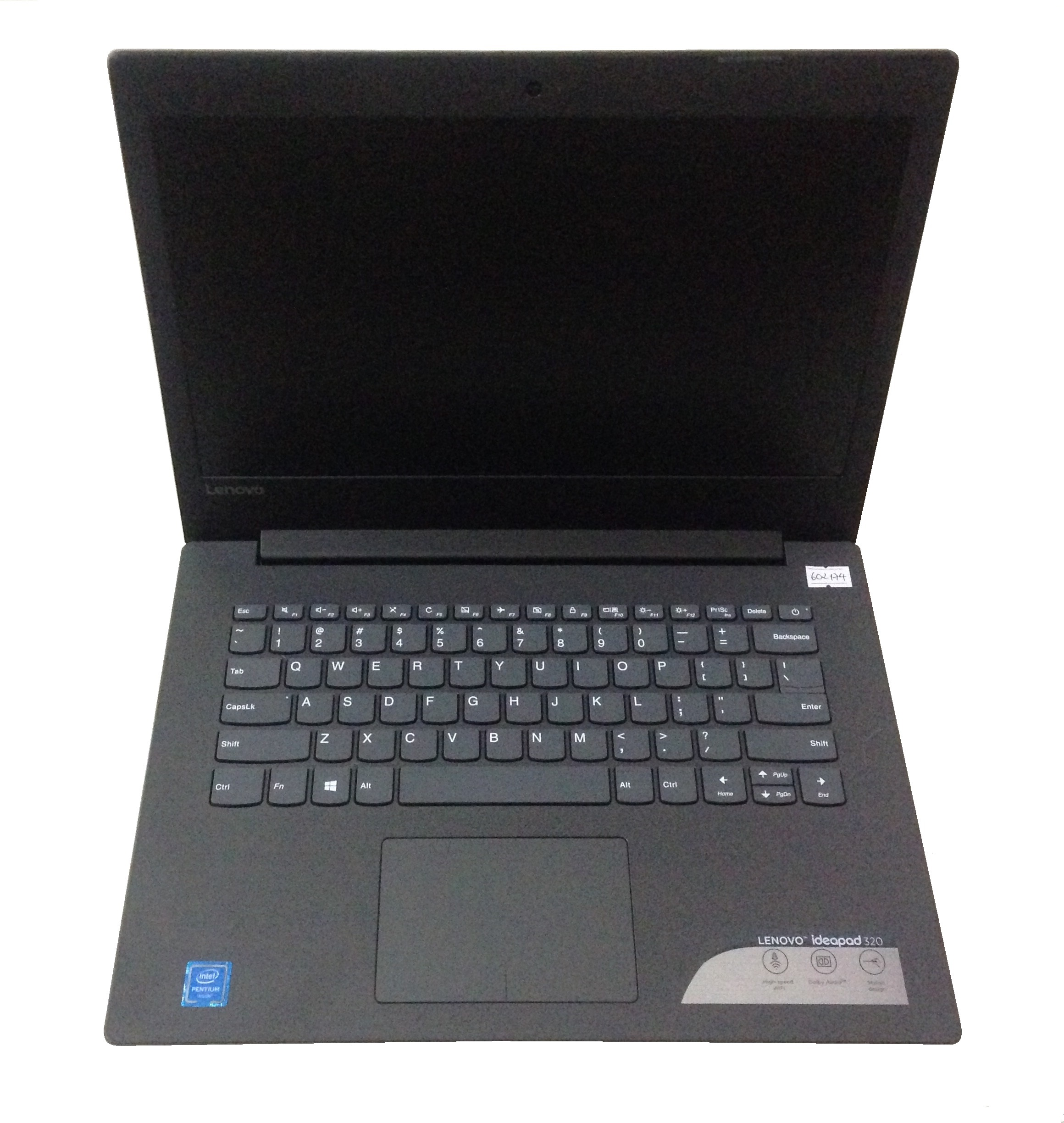
- Developer: Lenovo
- Manufacturer: Lenovo
- Type: Laptop, 2-in-1 laptop
- Released: January 2008; 18 years ago
- Operating system: Windows, Linux, ChromeOS
- CPU: AMD, Intel, Qualcomm
- Display: Up to 16"
- Graphics: AMD, NVIDIA, Qualcomm, Intel
- Input: Keyboard, trackpad, touchscreen, pen
- Marketing target: Consumer
- Predecessor: Lenovo 3000
- Related: IdeaCentre, Yoga
- Website: IdeaPad

IdeaPad is a line of consumer-oriented laptop computers designed, developed and marketed by Lenovo.

The IdeaPad mainly competes against computers such as Acer's Aspire and Swift, Asus's VivoBook and ZenBook, Dell's Inspiron and XPS, HP's Pavilion, Envy, Stream, and Spectre, Samsung's Galaxy Book and Toshiba's Satellite.

== History ==
Former IdeaPad logo

IdeaPad logo until 2022

The IdeaPad laptops were announced in January 2008. The first three models in the product line were the Y710, the Y510, and the U110. Some of the features that defined these first three models were widescreens, VeriFace facial recognition, frameless screens, touch controls, and Dolby speaker systems.

The IdeaPad design marked a deviation from the business-oriented ThinkPad laptops, towards a more consumer-oriented look and feel. Among these changes were a glossy screen and the absence of the traditional ThinkPad TrackPoint.

On September 21, 2016, Lenovo confirmed that their Yoga series is not meant to be compatible with Linux operating systems, that they know it is impossible to install Linux on some models, and that it is not supported. This came in the wake of media coverage of problems that users were having while trying to install Ubuntu on several Yoga models, including the 900 ISK2, 900 ISK For Business, 900S, and 710, which were traced back to Lenovo intentionally disabling and removing support for the AHCI storage mode for the device's solid-state drive in the computer's BIOS, in favor of a RAID mode that is only supported by Windows 10 drivers that come with the system. (This is also noted to make creation of Windows installation media more difficult than it normally is, as the process requires extracting a storage driver and loading it during the Windows installation process, or else the installer will not see the SSD.)

In February 2020, the Lenovo IdeaPad S940 was the world's cheapest 4K laptop. This IdeaPad notebook, made of aluminium, was the world's first laptop to feature a curved Contour Display.

== Current series ==
=== 1 series (2020–unknown) ===
Lenovo originally manufactured ultra-budget variants of the IdeaPad, called IdeaPad 1. It is not known if this lineup has been discontinued yet.

=== 3 series (2020–now) ===
Lenovo originally released the IdeaPad 3 series in early 2020. Since then, Lenovo has sold different variants of the IdeaPad 3, such as the standard IdeaPad 3, IdeaPad Slim 3, IdeaPad Flex 3, and IdeaPad Gaming 3.

=== 5-series (2020–now) ===
Along with IdeaPad 3, the IdeaPad 5 series was released in early 2020. In the lineup are the standard IdeaPad 5, IdeaPad Slim 5, and IdeaPad Flex 5.

=== Vibe (2026) ===
Lenovo introduced the IdeaPad Vibe on September 3, 2026, at IFA 2026 in Berlin, Germany. It comes with either an AMD Ryzen AI 400 or a Qualcomm Snapdragon X chip. The AMD models will be released in October 2026, while the Snapdragon models will be launched in November 2026. No release date has been determined for an Intel model yet.

At a starting price of US$699, sources have said that the IdeaPad Vibe is a competitor to Dell's XPS 13, as well as Apple's MacBook Neo, due to a colorful new design, a range of processor options, and an affordable price.

The IdeaPad Vibe comes with 8 GB of RAM, which can be upgraded to 24 GB for the Snapdragon model, or 32 GB for the AMD model.

== Discontinued series ==
=== Y series (2008–2016) ===
The first laptops in the IdeaPad Y Series line were showcased in CES 2008. These were the IdeaPad Y710 and Y510 laptops, with 17-inch and 15-inch screens, respectively. The Y series is a line of ordinary laptops with gaming-oriented appearance – a marked difference from ThinkPads.

=== IdeaPad Yoga 13 ===
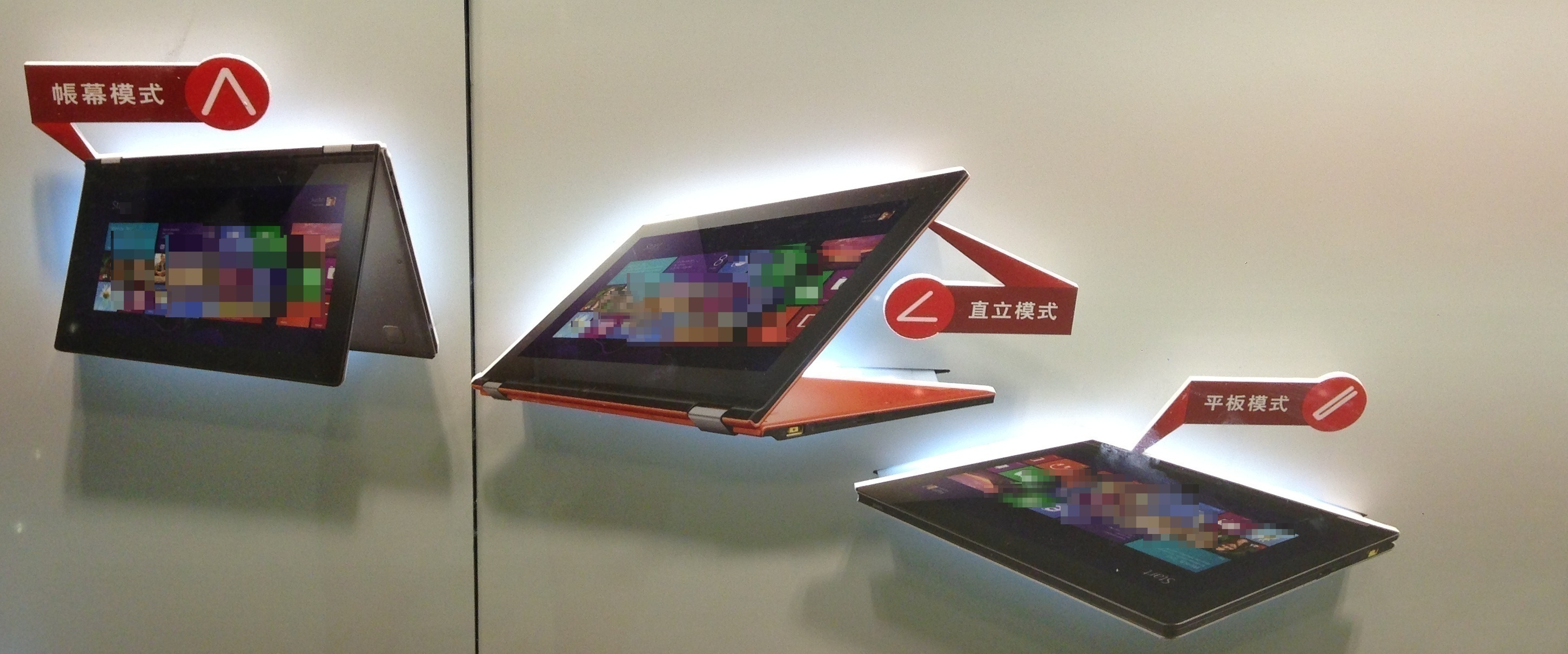
Various configurations possible with the Yoga 11S and Yoga 13

The Lenovo IdeaPad Yoga 13 is a hybrid notebook/tablet computer created by Lenovo and first announced at the International CES 2012 in January.

=== IdeaPad Yoga 11 ===
The Lenovo IdeaPad Yoga 11 is a hybrid laptop/tablet Windows RT based computer released in late 2012. The Yoga 11 and Yoga 13 computers both get their names from their unique design that enables the devices to rotate their screen backwards to become tablet devices.

The Yoga 11's small amount of RAM is sufficient due to the reduced memory requirements of Windows RT applications. The Yoga 11 was sold with solid-state drives in 32 GB and 64 GB capacities. The Yoga 11 runs the Windows RT operating system. Microsoft Office 2013 ships pre-installed. Like all Windows RT devices, the Yoga 11 cannot run software designed for earlier versions of Windows, only apps designed for the new Metro interface are compatible.

=== IdeaPad Yoga 11S ===
The IdeaPad Yoga 11S is a compact ultralight hybrid notebook/tablet computer which released in 2013. Like the Yoga 13 and the Yoga 11 the Yoga 11S gets its name from its ability to take on various form factors due to its screen being mounted on a special two-way hinge. The Yoga 11S runs the full version of Microsoft's Windows 8 operating system.

Like other models in the IdeaPad Yoga line, the Yoga 11S has a convertible form factor. Its screen can flip into a range of positions that allow it to serve as a regular laptop and tablet device as well as being able to function in "tent mode" and "stand mode." Like the Yoga 11, the 11S was available in silver and clementine orange. The Yoga 11S can be configured with Intel's "Ivy Bridge" Core i7 processor, support up to a 256 GB SSD, and can hold 8 GB of RAM. The Yoga 11S has an 11.6" display with available options for resolutions of 1366×768 pixels and 1600×900 pixels.

=== IdeaPad Yoga Tablet ===
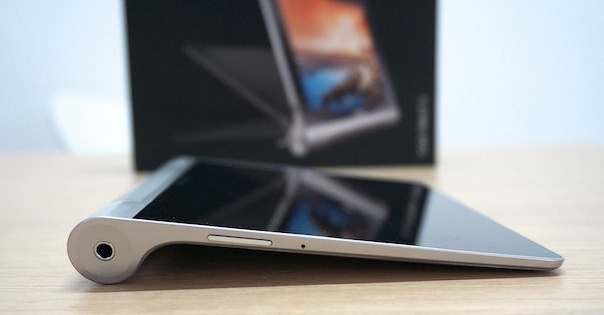
Lenovo Yoga Tablet with packaging

The IdeaPad Yoga Tablet is an Android tablet with a multi-mode device with a rear kickstand designed to allow it to be placed upright for viewing videos and other media or tilted for easier text entry.

=== S series (2008–unknown) ===
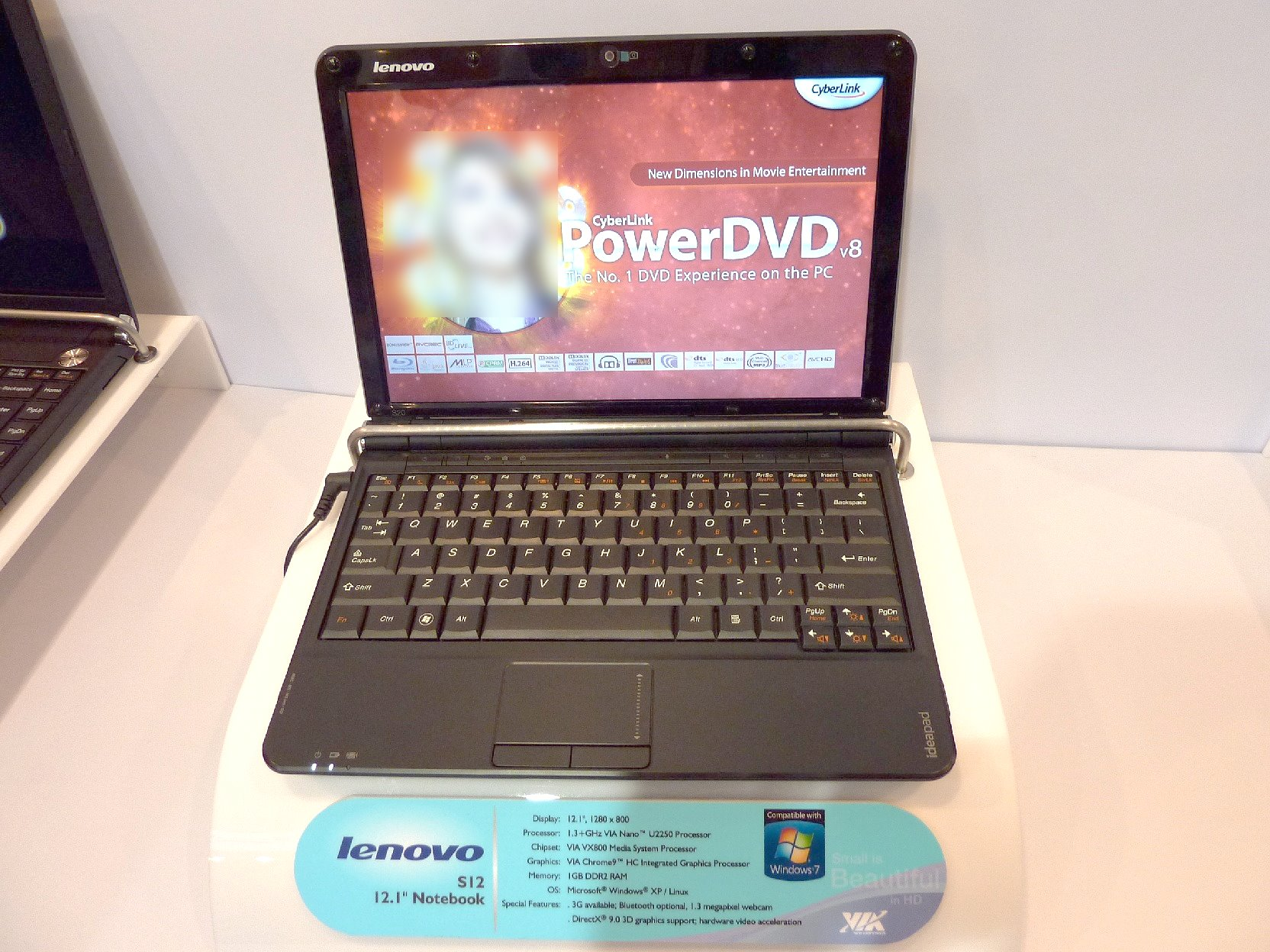
The Nvidia Ion version of IdeaPad S12

The first laptop in Lenovo's netbook IdeaPad S Series was scheduled for launch in September 2008 but was delayed, with an estimated release date of November . Ultimately, the laptop was released in September in China, but in October in the United States. It is not known if this series has been discontinued yet.

=== C series (2019–2020) ===
The IdeaPad C340 series was announced in February 2019 and quietly discontinued in 2020 due to being replaced with the IdeaPad Flex series.

=== L series (2019–2020) ===
The IdeaPad L340 series was announced in April 2019, and its design was identical to other IdeaPad models. It was quietly discontinued in 2020, and its gaming counterpart was succeeded by the IdeaPad Gaming 3 series.

=== Flex series (2013–2025) ===
The Lenovo IdeaPad Flex was a dual-mode laptop line by Lenovo; unlike the Lenovo IdeaPad Yoga line, the keyboard does not bend back entirely to allow use as a tablet, as it's only a dual-mode laptop (except some models). The line was discontinued in around 2025 by Lenovo.

=== Gaming series (2020–2024) ===
The first IdeaPad Gaming 3 models, the IdeaPad Gaming 3 15ARH05 (AMD) and 15IMH05 (Intel) were announced in April 2020, replacing the older IdeaPad L340 Gaming. All models consisted of GTX 1650 series graphics and a standard blue backlit keyboard. While most laptops consisted of either a 256 GB or 512 GB solid state drive as the primary boot drive, with some configurations featuring a 1 TB mechanical 2.5-inch SATA disk drive for storage, certain models featured only a 1 TB mechanical disk drive as the primary boot drive.

In 2021, the lineup received a minor design refresh and new specs like Nvidia's GeForce RTX laptop GPUs: the RTX 3050 or 3050 Ti for standard configurations, and the RTX 3060 for top-tier configurations, alongside the older GTX 1650 GPU, a 4-zone RGB keyboard (for higher configurations only, as standard models retained a standard white backlit keyboard), and a redesigned cooling system. Following the refresh, the original IdeaPad Gaming 3 15ARH05 and 15IMH05 models were discontinued and withdrawn by Lenovo. The RTX 3060 models do not feature SATA disk drive support.

The lineup received its second and final redesign in 2022, which introduced a similar form factor to the Legion. It involved moving the charging, Type-C, LAN, and HDMI ports to the back, while the USB ports and headphone jack remained on the sides, though there was one USB port on each side rather than two on one side like the previous models, and the headphone jack was moved to the left side from the right side. The SATA drive bay was also removed.

IdeaPad Gaming 3 15ACH6 (alternate sticker placement) at Lenovo Exclusive Store in Pavilion Bukit Jalil

In 2023, Lenovo discontinued most IdeaPad Gaming 3 15ACH6 and 15IHU6 models worldwide, including the RTX 3050, 3050 Ti, and 3060 models, but quietly re-released the models with either an AMD Ryzen 5 5500H or Intel Core i5-11320H, with all refreshed models having an entry-level RTX 2050 graphics processor, but only in certain countries. The GTX 1650 models also remained on sale alongside the RTX 2050 models, but only in India. Due to the refreshed models clashing with production of the LOQ series, which was new at the time, the sticker placement was transferred from the left side to the right side for all refreshed models, including the IdeaPad Gaming 3 15ACH6 and 15IHU6 models.

2024 was the last production year for the IdeaPad Gaming 3 15ACH6 and 15ARH7 models, which remained on sale in India while being phased out elsewhere in early 2024. While no specific date was given, they were officially withdrawn by Lenovo, possibly by the end of 2024, completing the transition from the IdeaPad Gaming 3 series to the LOQ series.

== See also ==
- IdeaPad tablets
- ThinkPad
