= ThinkPad =

Business laptops and tablets series from Lenovo, historically IBM

- Developer: Developers: IBM (1992–2004); LG/IBM (1996–2004, only for South Korea branding); Acer (1998–2002, i series); Lenovo (2005–present)
- Manufacturer: IBM (1992–2004); Lenovo (2005–present)
- Type: Laptop, Hybrid tablet, Handheld
- Released: October 5, 1992; 34 years ago
- Lifespan: 1992–present
- Units sold: >200 million (2022)
- Operating system: Windows, Linux
- CPU: AMD, Intel
- Graphics: AMD, Nvidia, Intel
- Marketing target: Business
- Related: ThinkBook, ThinkCentre, ThinkStation, IdeaPad
- Website: www.lenovo.com/us/en/thinkpad/

ThinkPad is a line of business-oriented laptop and tablet computers produced since 1992. It was originally designed, created and manufactured by the American International Business Machines (IBM) Corporation. IBM sold its PC business to the Chinese company Lenovo in 2005; since 2007, all ThinkPad models have been manufactured by Lenovo.

The ThinkPad line was first developed at the IBM Yamato Facility in Japan; they have a distinct black, boxy design, which originated in 1990 and is still used in some models. Most models also feature a red-colored trackpoint on the keyboard, which has become an iconic and distinctive design characteristic associated with the ThinkPad line. It has seen significant success in the business market while certain models target students and the education market. ThinkPad laptops have been used in outer space and for many years were the only laptops certified for use on the International Space Station (ISS). ThinkPads have also for several years been one of the preferred laptops used by the United Nations.

== History ==
Following the failure of the first laptop computer, the PC Convertible, IBM was the last of the major personal computer manufacturers to enter the fast-growing notebook market, launching the PS/2 Note in 1992. Building on the PS/2 Note, the ThinkPad was developed to compete with Compaq in the United States, whose LTE was the first commercially successful notebook PC; as well as Apple Computer's highly successful PowerBook, and Toshiba in Japan, whose Dynabook series of notebooks were similarly successful. IBM signed a lucrative contract with the Harvard Business School to provide the campus with notebook PCs. The task of creating a notebook was given to the Yamato Facility in Japan, headed by Arimasa Naitoh (内藤在正, Naitō Arimasa; Vice President of Lenovo's PC and Smart Devices business unit), a Japanese engineer and product designer who had joined IBM in the 1970s, now known as the "Father of ThinkPad".

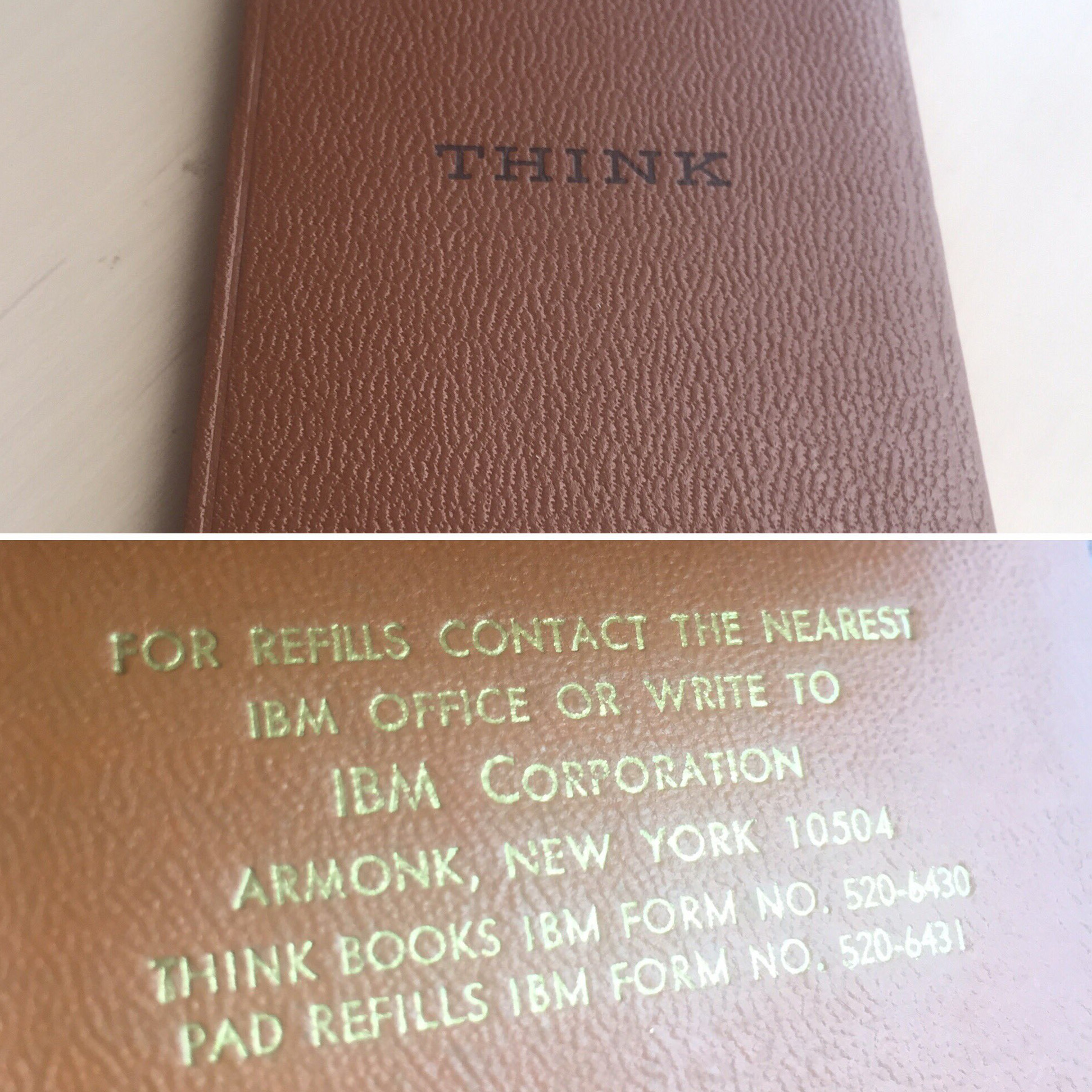
A 1980s-era IBM THINK notepad (above), which inspired the laptop name, and the notepad refill information (below)

The name "ThinkPad" was a product of IBM's corporate history and culture. Thomas J. Watson Sr. first introduced "Think" as an IBM slogan in the 1920s. With every minicomputer and mainframe IBM installed (almost all were leased – not sold), a plastic sign with the text "Think" printed on an aluminum plate was placed atop the operator's console.

For decades, IBM had also distributed small notepads with the word "THINK" emblazoned on their cover to customers and employees. The name "ThinkPad" was suggested by IBM employee Denny Wainwright, who had one such notepad in his pocket. The name was opposed by the IBM corporate naming committee as all the names for IBM computers were numeric at that time, but "ThinkPad" was kept due to praise from journalists and the public.

=== Early models ===
ThinkPad wordmark during the 1990s

In April 1992, IBM announced the first ThinkPad models, the 300, 700, and 700C all released on October 5, 1992. The 700T released in 1993 was a tablet computer.

This machine was the first product produced under IBM's new "differentiated product personality" strategy, a collaboration between Richard Sapper and Tom Hardy, head of the corporate IBM Design Program. Development of the 700C also involved a close working relationship between Sapper and Kazuhiko Yamazaki, lead notebook designer at IBM's Yamato Design Center in Japan and liaison between Sapper and Yamato engineering.

This 1990–1992 "pre-Internet" collaboration between Italy and Japan was facilitated by a special Sony digital communications system that transmitted high-res images over telephone lines. This system was established in several key global Design Centers by Hardy so IBM designers could visually communicate more effectively and interact directly with Sapper for advice on their projects. For his innovative design management leadership during ThinkPad development, Hardy was named "Innovator of the Year 1992" by PC Magazine.

The first ThinkPad tablet, a PenPoint-based device formally known as the IBM ThinkPad 2521, was positioned as a developer's release. The ThinkPad tablet became available for purchase by the general public, as the 700T, in October of the same year.

IBM marketed the ThinkPad creatively, through methods such as early customer pilot programs, numerous pre-launch announcements, and an extensive loaner program designed to showcase the product's strengths and weaknesses, including loaning a machine to archaeologists excavating the ancient Egyptian city of Leontopolis. The resulting report documented the ThinkPad's excellent performance under difficult conditions; "The ThinkPad is an impressive machine, rugged enough to be used without special care in the worst conditions Egypt has to offer." The positive critical and commercial reception of the ThinkPad played a key part in reversing IBM's fortunes.

The first ThinkPads were very successful, collecting more than 300+ awards for design and quality.

=== Acquisition by Lenovo ===
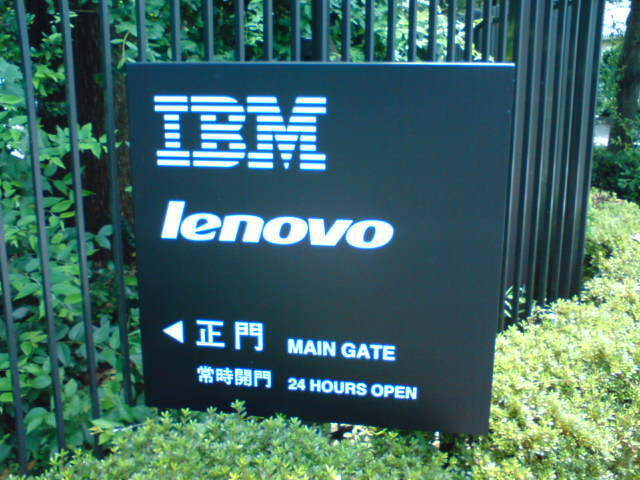
IBM/Lenovo's Yamato Lab where the Think line of products is developed

In 2005, Lenovo purchased the IBM personal computer business and the ThinkPad as a flagship brand along with it. Lenovo founder Liu Chuanzhi said, "We benefited in three ways from the IBM acquisition. We got the ThinkPad brand, IBM's more advanced PC manufacturing technology and the company's international resources, such as its global sales channels and operation teams. These three elements have shored up our sales revenue in the past several years."

Although Lenovo received the rights to use the IBM brand name for five years after acquiring IBM's personal computer division, it was only used for three years. By 2012, Lenovo was manufacturing and marketing Think-branded products, while IBM primarily handled servicing and repairs. At that time both IBM and Lenovo played a key role in the design of their "Think" branded products.

=== Manufacturing ===
In the 1990s and the early 2000s, the majority of IBM ThinkPad computers were manufactured at their own facilities in Mexico, Japan, and Scotland. IBM also assembled ThinkPads in the United States at their Research Triangle Park manufacturing plant in North Carolina, using both US and non-US components, especially for government and enterprise clients. When designed by IBM, some ThinkPads were manufactured by original equipment manufacturers, including Acer of Taiwan for some i Series models such as i 1200.

Prior to the Lenovo acquisition of their PC business in 2005, IBM also has a joint venture facility in Shenzhen, China, with Great Wall Technology, named International Information Products Company (IIPC). The facility produces ThinkPads and other IBM computers for local and global markets.

The majority of ThinkPad computers since the 2005 acquisition of the brand by Lenovo are manufactured in Mexico, Slovakia, India, and China. Lenovo employs ~300 people at a combined manufacturing and distribution center near its American headquarters. Each device made in this facility is labeled with a red-white-and-blue sticker proclaiming "Whitsett, North Carolina."

ThinkPad logo (1992–2004)
Badge design used on ThinkPads, 1992–2004
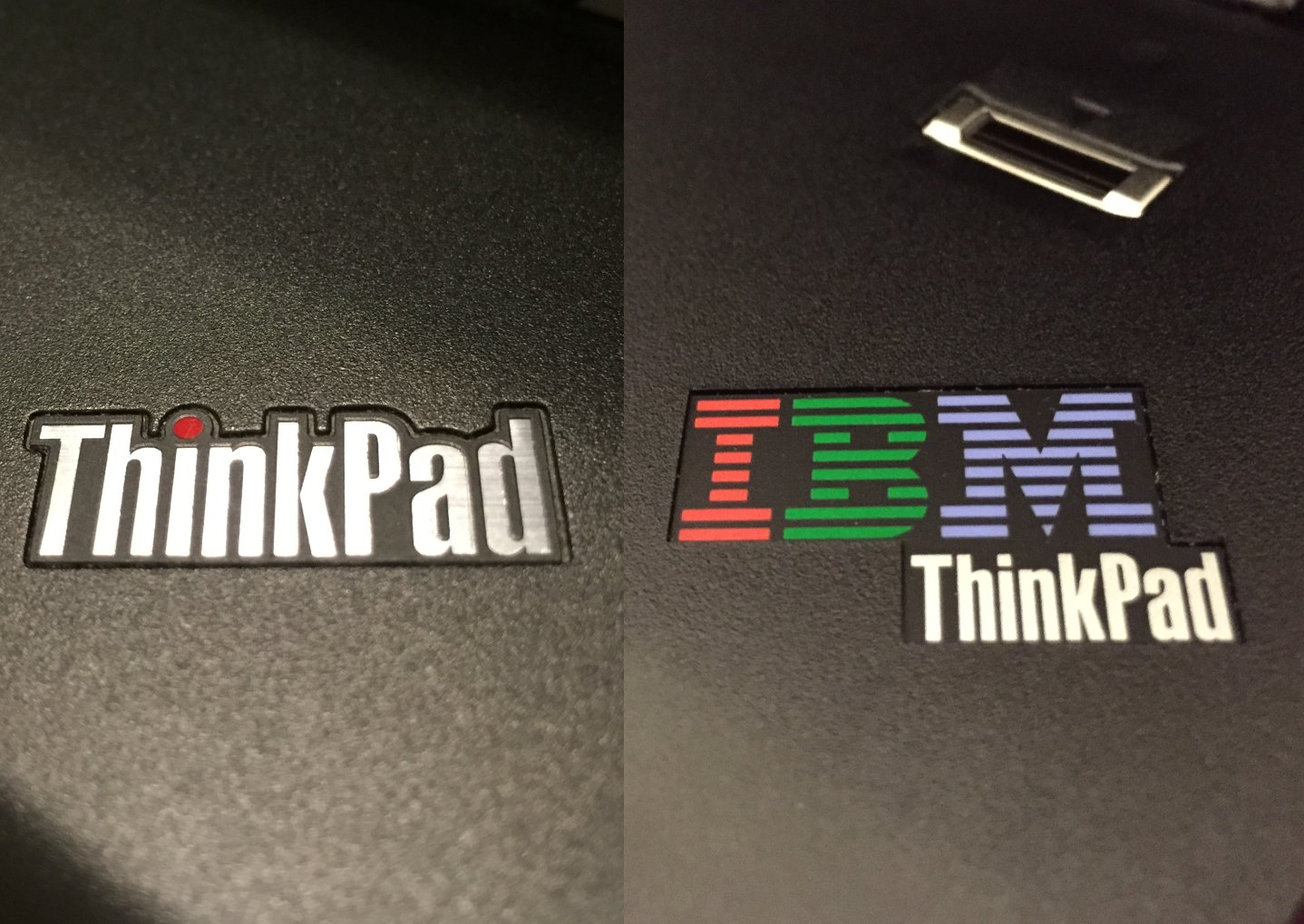
The ThinkPad logo used by Lenovo since 2006 (left) and the original IBM ThinkPad logo (right)

In 2012, Lenovo produced a short run of special edition anniversary ThinkPads in Yonezawa, Yamagata, Japan, in partnership with NEC, as part of a larger goal to move manufacturing away from China and into Japan.

In 2014, although sales rose 5.6 percent from the previous year, Lenovo lost its position as the top commercial notebook maker. However, the company celebrated a milestone in 2015 with the shipment of the 100 millionth unit of its ThinkPad line.

In 2017, Lenovo launched a ThinkPad model to celebrate the 25th anniversary of the ThinkPad brand. It is based on the T470 and uses a similar keyboard to the 700C.

In 2022, Lenovo launched the ThinkPad X1 Carbon Gen 10 Special Edition to celebrate the 30th anniversary of the ThinkPad brand.

In 2023, Lenovo launched ThinkPad X1 Carbon 12 edition.

In late 2024, Lenovo launched ThinkPad Carbon 13 Aura which is an upgrade from the previous Carbon 12 edition.

2025 brought with it a new generation of the X1 Carbon, with the X1 Carbon Gen 13. Along with this, Lenovo released the X1 2-in-1 Gen 10, which utilizes a 360-degree hinge which allows the user to turn it into a tablet.

== Design ==
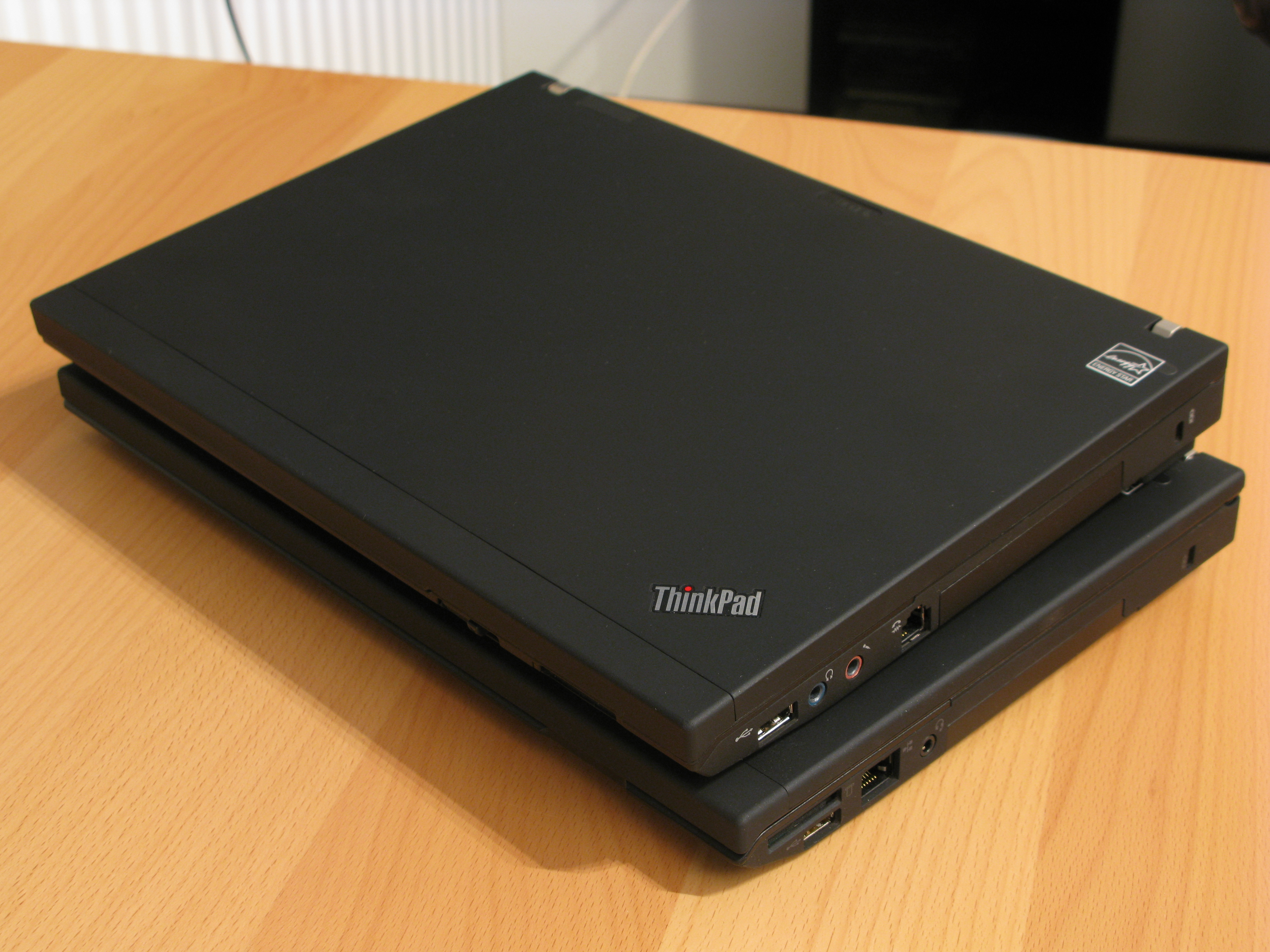
A ThinkPad's characteristic boxy black exterior (X201 on top of an X220)

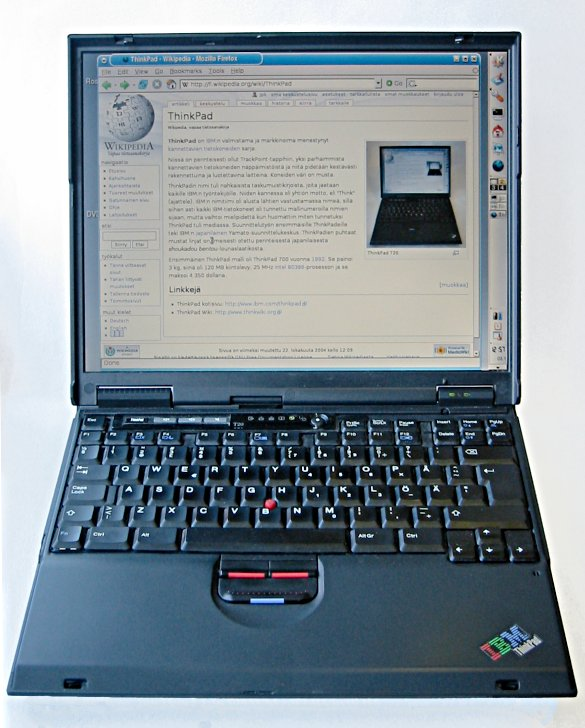
An IBM ThinkPad T20

The appearance of the ThinkPad has remained very similar throughout the entire lifetime of the brand. Almost all models are solid black inside and out, with a boxy case design. Some newer Lenovo models incorporate more curved lines. Many ThinkPads utilize magnesium, carbon fiber reinforced plastic, or titanium in their chassis.

The industrial design concept was created in 1990 by Italy-based designer Richard Sapper, a corporate design consultant of IBM and, since 2005, Lenovo. The design was based on the concept of a traditional Japanese bento lunchbox, which revealed its nature only after being opened. According to later interviews with Sapper, he also characterized the simple ThinkPad form to be as elementary as a simple, black cigar box and with similar proportions, with the same observation that it offers a 'surprise' when opened.

Since 1992, the ThinkPad design has been regularly updated, developed, and refined over the years by Sapper and the respective teams at IBM and later Lenovo. On the occasion of the 20th anniversary of ThinkPad's introduction, David Hill, who oversaw ThinkPad design from 1995 to 2017, authored and designed a commemorative book about ThinkPad design titled ThinkPad Design: Spirit & Essence.

The following ThinkPads have won design awards:

Year	Model(s)	Awards	Notes/Specific Awards
1993	ThinkPad 550BJ, ThinkPad 720C, ThinkPad 320, ThinkPad 220, PS/55 T22SX, ThinkPad 710T	Japan Good Design Award	ThinkPad 220, PS/55 T22SX and ThinkPad 710T: Gold winners, Japan Good Design Award,
1994	ThinkPad ポータブル拡張ユニット（スピーカー付), ThinkPad 755C, ThinkPad 755C, ThinkPad 555BJ, ThinkPad 230Cs, ThinkPad 755CDV	Japan Good Design Award	
1995	ThinkPad 850, ThinkPad 820, ThinkPad 530CS, ThinkPad 701C	Japan Good Design Award	
1996	ThinkPad 701C	Die Gute Industrieform IF Top Ten Award	
1997	ThinkPad 560E, ThinkPad 380D	Japan Good Design Award	ThinkPad 560: Die Gute Industrieform IF Award
1998	ThinkPad 770E/ED, ThinkPad 600, ThinkPad 560X, ThinkPad 385XD	Japan Good Design Award	ThinkPad 770, ThinkPad 380: Die Gute Industrieform IF Award
1999	ThinkPad 390E, ThinkPad i Series Model 1476, ThinkPad 570, ThinkPad 240	Japan Good Design Award	ThinkPad 600: International Design Excellence Award
2001	ThinkPad i Series 1800, ThinkPad T22, ThinkPad A21e, ThinkPad A22p, ThinkPad i Series S30, ThinkPad i Series 1620, ThinkPad TransNote, ThinkPad X21	Japan Good Design Award IDSA	ThinkPad 2000 Family: International Design Excellence Award
2002	ThinkPad R30, ThinkPad T30, ThinkPad A30	Japan Good Design Award IDSA	ThinkPad A30: Gold winner, Japan Good Design Award, International Design Excellence Award
2003	ThinkPad R40, ThinkPad X30, ThinkPad T40, ThinkPad G40	Japan Good Design Award IDSA	
2004	ThinkPad X40, ThinkPad R50 ThinkPad G41	Japan Good Design Award	
2005	ThinkPad Z60m, ThinkPad Z60t, ThinkPad x41 Tablet	Japan Good Design Award	
2006	ThinkPad R60, ThinkPad T60, ThinkPad X60/X60s ThinkPad G50	Japan Good Design Award	
2007	ThinkPad X61/X61s, ThinkPad X61 Tablet	Japan Good Design Award	
2008	ThinkPad X200T, ThinkPad X200/X200s, ThinkPad W700, ThinkPad X300	Japan Good Design Award	ThinkPad Long Life Design: Japan Good Design Award
2009	ThinkPad SL410, ThinkPad T400s	Japan Good Design Award	
2010	ThinkPad X201 Tablet, ThinkPad X201/X201s, ThinkPad X100e, ThinkPad Edge	Japan Good Design Award	
2011	ThinkPad X1, ThinkPad X220, ThinkPad X220 Tablet, ThinkPad T420s, ThinkPad T520, ThinkPad Edge, ThinkPad Tablet	Japan Good Design Award	
2012	ThinkPad T430s, ThinkPad X230, ThinkPad X1 Carbon	Japan Good Design Award	ThinkPad X1 Carbon: Very Best 100 winner, Japan Good Design Award, Die Gute Industrieform IF Award
2013	ThinkPad T431s	Japan Good Design Award	ThinkPad X1 Carbon: Die Gute Industrieform IF Award
2014	ThinkPad Yoga, ThinkPad X240s, ThinkPad T440s, ThinkPad X1 Carbon, ThinkPad 8	Japan Good Design Award Red Dot Design Award iF Design Award	ThinkPad X1 Carbon: Best of Best Red Dot Design Award, Die Gute Industrieform IF Award
2015	ThinkPad Stack, ThinkPad Yoga 14, ThinkPad 10, ThinkPad Helix	Red Dot Design Award	
2016	ThinkPad X1 Carbon, ThinkPad X1 Tablet, ThinkPad X1 Yoga, ThinkPad Yoga 260	Japan Good Design Award Red Dot Design Award iF Design Award	ThinkPad X1 Tablet: Gold iF Design Award
2017	ThinkPad 25, ThinkPad X1 Carbon, ThinkPad X1 Yoga, ThinkPad T470	Japan Good Design Award Red Dot Design Award iF Design Award	
2018	ThinkPad X1 Extreme, ThinkPad P1, ThinkPad X1 Yoga G3, ThinkPad X1 Carbon G6, ThinkPad X1 Tablet G3, ThinkPad 25	Japan Good Design Award Red Dot Design Award iF Design Award	
2019	ThinkPad X1 Yoga Gen 4, ThinkPad X1 Carbon G7, ThinkPad X1 Extreme, ThinkPad P1	Japan Good Design Award Red Dot Design Award iF Design Award	
2020	ThinkPad 11e Yoga Gen 6, ThinkPad X1 Nano, ThinkPad X1 Fold, ThinkPad X1 Carbon G7, ThinkPad X1 Yoga G4	Japan Good Design Award Red Dot Design Award iF Design Award	ThinkPad X1 Fold: Best of Best Red Dot Design Award
2021	ThinkPad X12 Detachable, ThinkPad X1 Yoga G6, ThinkPad X1 Carbon G9, ThinkPad X1 Nano, ThinkPad X1 Fold, ThinkPad X1 Titanium G1, ThinkPad X1 Extreme, ThinkPad P1 G4	Japan Good Design Award Red Dot Design Award iF Design Award IDSA	ThinkPad X1 Fold: IDSA Award
2022	ThinkPad X13s, ThinkPad Z13, ThinkPad Z16, ThinkPad P16, ThinkPad Neo 14	Japan Good Design Award Red Dot Design Award iF Design Award	
2023	ThinkPad X13 G4, ThinkPad X13 Yoga G4, ThinkPad Z13 G2, ThinkPad X1 Fold 16, ThinkPad X1 Carbon G12	Japan Good Design Award Red Dot Design Award iF Design Award Chicago Good Design Award	ThinkPad Z13 G2, ThinkPad X1 Fold 16: Chicago Good Design Award
2024	ThinkPad X1 Carbon G12, ThinkPad X1 2-in-1 G9, ThinkPad T14s G5, ThinkPad P1 G7, ThinkPad X13 G4, ThinkPad X13 Yoga G4, ThinkPad	Japan Good Design Award Red Dot Design Award iF Design Award IDSA Chicago Good Design Award	ThinkPad Long Life Design: Japan Good Design Award ThinkPad Z13: IDSA Award
2025	ThinkPad X9, ThinkPad X13 G6	Red Dot Design Award iF Design Award	ThinkPad X9: Best of Best Red Dot Design Award

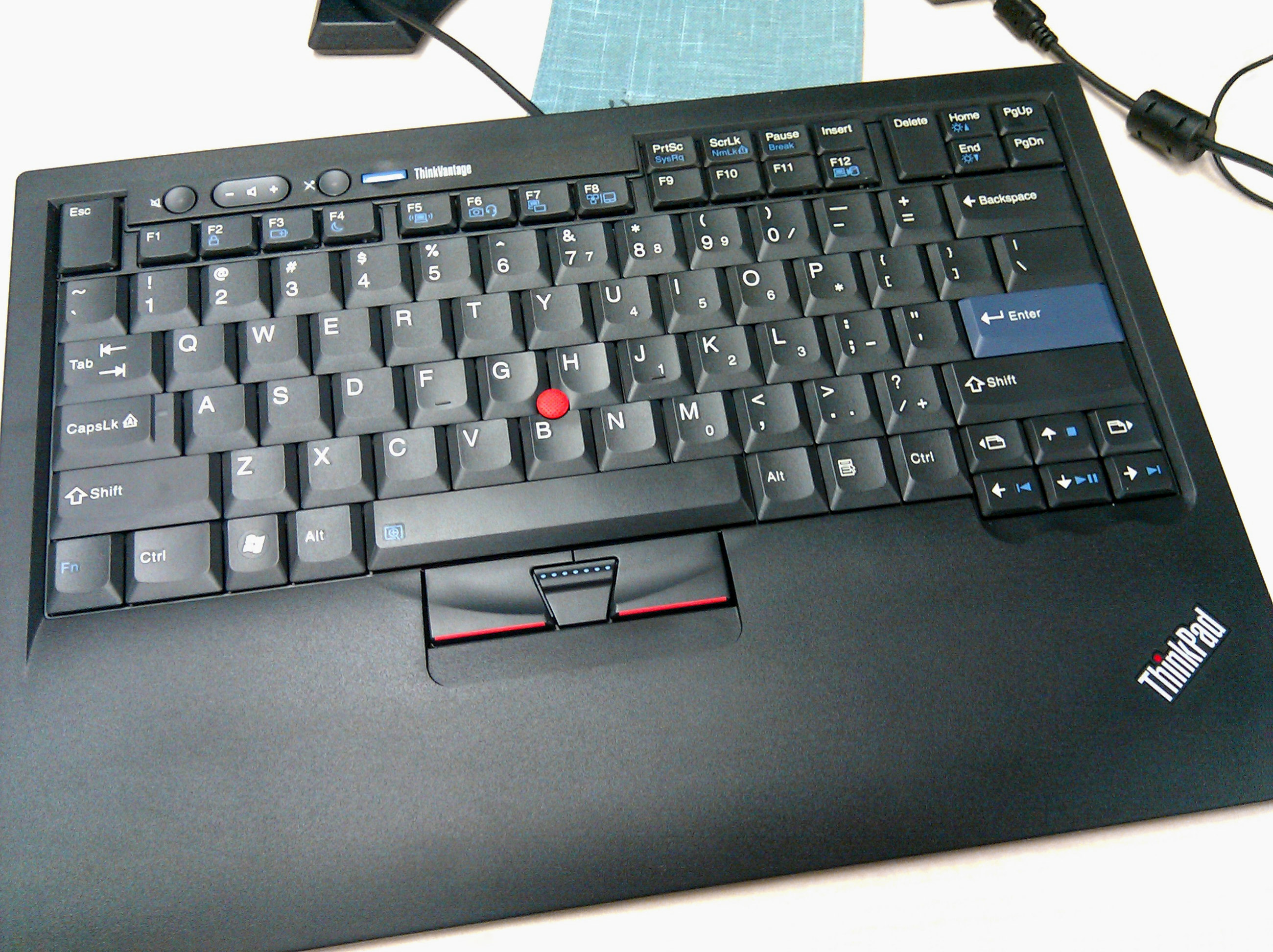
This ThinkPad compact keyboard features a wired device, blue ThinkVantage button and Enter key, TrackPoint pointer and has no touchpad.

== Features and technologies ==
Several laptop features were introduced or popularised by the ThinkPad:

=== Current ===
- Lenovo Vantage

Previously known as "IBM Access", later "ThinkVantage", the Lenovo Vantage is a suite of computer management applications. This software can give additional support for system management (backup, encrypting, system drivers installation and upgrade, system monitoring and others). Currently, some legacy features have been replaced by internal Windows 10/11 features.

- ThinkShutter

ThinkShutter is the branding of a webcam privacy shutter present in some ThinkPad notebook computers. It allows the user to obstruct the webcam's view. Some add-on webcams and other laptop brands provide a similar feature. IdeaPad notebooks carry the TrueBlock branding for their privacy shutters. These mechanical sliders are present on Lenovo's LOQ series of laptops as well as a digital version on most of Lenovo's Legion gaming laptops.

- Spill-resistant keyboards

All ThinkPad models have a keyboard membrane and drain holes (L series, P series, E series, T series, X series, X1 series, and Z series models), and some have a solid rubber or plastic membrane (like L series, W series, X1 series, and current T and X series), without draining holes.

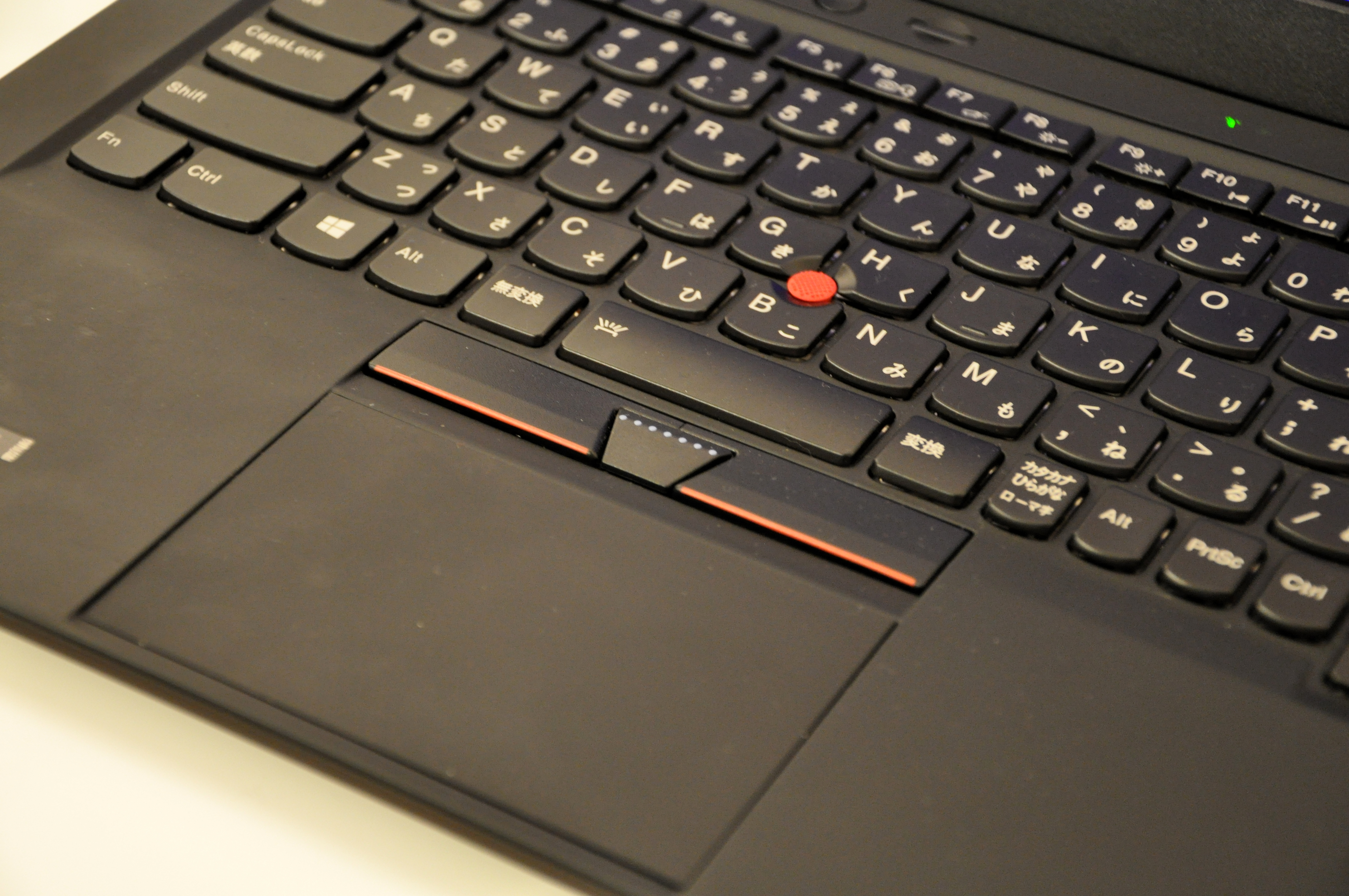
Touchpad + TrackPoint combination; modern keyboard

- UltraNav

The first ThinkPad 700 was equipped with the signature TrackPoint red dot pointing stick invented by Ted Selker. By 2000 the trackpad pointer had become more popular for laptops due to innovations by Synaptics so IBM introduced UltraNav as a complementary combination of TrackPoint and TouchPad designed by Dave Sawin, Hiroaki Yasuda, Fusanobo Nakamura, and Mitsuo Horiuchi to please all users.

- A roll cage frame and stainless steel hinges with 180° or 360° opening angle

The "roll cage" is an internal frame, designed to minimize motherboard flex (current P series and T##p series) or magnesium composite case (all other hi-end models). The display modules lack magnesium frames, and some 2012–2016 models have a common issue with a cracked plastic lid. The 180° hinges are typical, the 360° hinges are a Yoga line basic feature.

- OLED screens

Introduced in 2016 as a high-end display option for some models.

- Active Protection System

Hard-drive protection for some ThinkPad models that still use the 2.5" drive bay; These systems use an accelerometer sensor to detect when a ThinkPad is falling and shut down the hard disk drive to prevent damage.

- Biometric fingerprint reader and NFC smart card reader options

The fingerprint reader was introduced as an option by IBM in 2004.

- Internal WWAN modules and Wi-Fi 3x3 MIMO

The Mobile broadband support is a common feature for most of the actual ThinkPad models after 2006; the support of 3x3 MIMO is a common feature for most high-end models.

Some additional features (dock stations, UltraBay, accessories support) were listed in the Accessories section.

=== Past ===
- ThinkLight

External keyboard light, replaced by internal backlight; is an LED light located at the top of the LCD screen which illuminates the keyboard from above.

- Power Bridge

Some E, L, T, X, W (only W550s), and P (only P##s) series ThinkPads feature (for some 2013–2018 models) — internal secondary battery (as a succession of secondary UltraBay battery) that support a hot-swapping of primary battery.

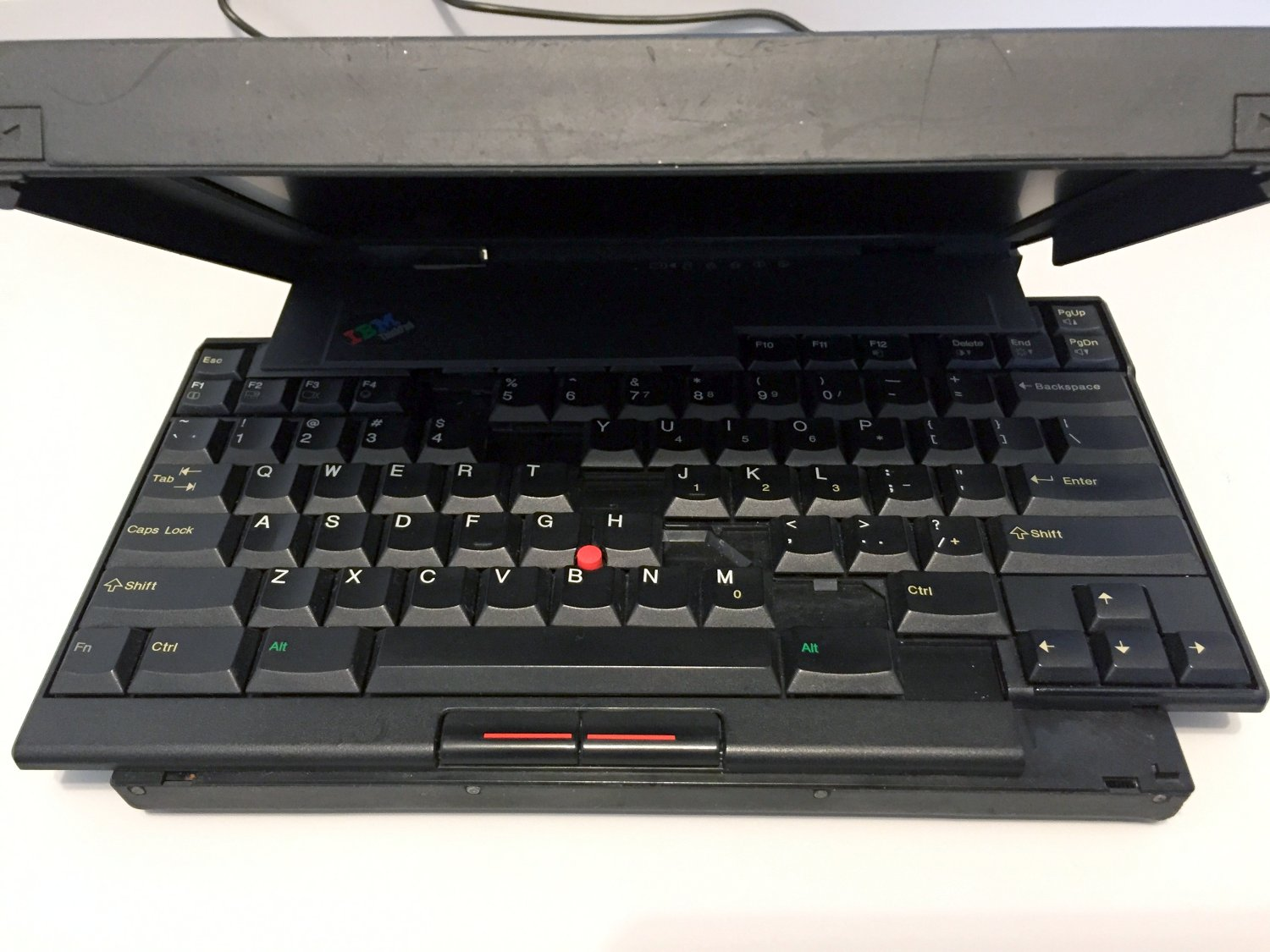
IBM ThinkPad 701 TrackWrite keyboard in mid fold (also known as the "Butterfly" keyboard)

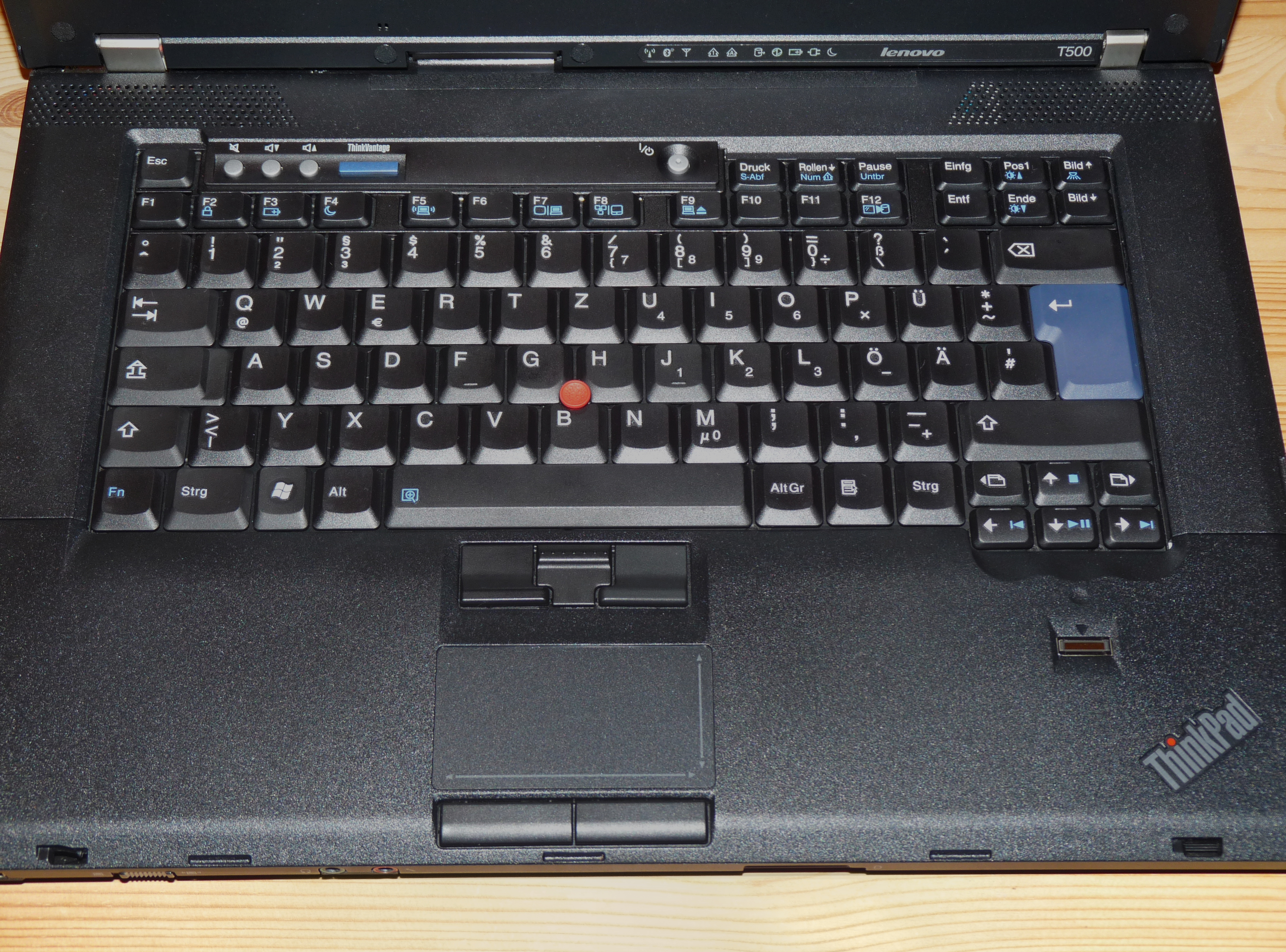
ThinkPad 7-row keyboard, replaced with a newer 'island' design in 2012. For user convenience, buttons with the same functions are located both above and below the touchpad.

- 7-row Keyboards

Original IBM keyboard design (1992–2012) — The original keyboard was offered in the ThinkPad line until 2012, when it was swapped out for the chiclet-style keyboard now used today.

IBM TrackWrite keyboard design — A keyboard designed by John Karidis introduced by IBM in 1995, used in the ThinkPad 701 series. When the machine is closed the keyboard is folded inwards, making the machine more compact. However, when the machine is open and in use, it slides out, giving the user a normal-sized keyboard. That keyboard, referred to as a butterfly keyboard is in the permanent collection of the Museum of Modern Art in New York City.

The ThinkPad 760 series also included an unusual keyboard design; the keyboard was elevated by two arms riding on small rails on the side of the screen, tilting the keyboard to achieve a more ergonomic design. The entire ThinkPad 760 series could be repaired or upgraded by lifting the keyboard and accessing its inner-contents — with laptop documentation project, MacDat, comparing this feature to the likes of "[Opening] the hood of a car." Under the keyboard, there was the battery, hard drive and modular bay or UltraBay.

The keyboard design was replaced by the Chiclet style keyboard (2012–current) in 2012. The chiclet-style keyboard does not support the ThinkLight for illumination, instead using a keyboard backlight. Some ThinkPad models during the intermission period between the classic IBM design and the Lenovo chiclet design could be outfitted with both the backlit chiclet-style keyboard and the ThinkLight.

- FlexView advanced fringe field switching or in-plane switching screens

The introduced in 2004 line of hi-end displays with wide view angles and optional high resolution (up to 15" 1600x1200 or (rarely) 2048x1536 pixels). Partially dropped in 2008 (after the partial defunct of BOE-Hydis display supplier), and reintroduced as an ordinary IPS screen option in 2013.

=== Batteries ===
Some ThinkPad laptops (such as the X230/X230t, T430s/T430 and T530/W530, all from 2012) block third-party batteries. Lenovo calls this feature "Battery Safeguard". It was first introduced on some models in May 2012. Laptops with this feature scan for security chips that only ThinkPad-branded batteries contain. Affected ThinkPads flash a message stating "Genuine Lenovo Battery Not Attached" when third-party batteries are used, and the battery will not charge.

== Operating systems ==
The ThinkPad has shipped with Microsoft Windows from its inception until the present day. Alongside IBM PC DOS, Windows 3.1x was the default operating system on the original ThinkPad 700.

IBM and Microsoft's joint operating system, known as Operating System/2 (OS/2), although not as popular, was also made available as an option from the ThinkPad 700 in 1992, and was officially supported until the T43 in 2005.

The ThinkPad Power series line, sold from 1994 through 1998, was available with AIX and Solaris operating systems.

IBM took its first steps toward ThinkPads with an alternative operating system, when they quietly certified the 390 model for SUSE Linux in November 1998. The company released its first Linux-based unit with the ThinkPad A20m in July 2000. This model, along with the closely-released A21m, T21, and T22 models, came preinstalled with Caldera OpenLinux. On September 24, 2001, the ThinkPads were substantially refreshed in time for the release of Microsoft's then-new Windows XP operating system, featuring new models such as the R, G, and Z series while updating preexisting ones such as the i, A, T and X series. IBM shifted away from preinstalled Linux on the ThinkPad after 2002, but continued to support other distributions such as Red Hat Linux, SUSE Linux Enterprise, and Turbolinux using customer installations on A30, A30p, A31p models. This continued through the Lenovo transition with the T60p, until September 2007.

The following year, ThinkPads began shipping with Linux again, when the R61 and T61 were released with SUSE Linux Enterprise as an option. This was short-lived, as Lenovo discontinued that practice in 2009. ThinkPad hardware continued to be certified for Linux.

In 2020, Lenovo shifted into much heavier support of Linux when they announced the ThinkPad X1 Carbon Gen 8, the P1 Gen 2, and the P53 would come with Fedora Linux as an option. This was the first time that Fedora Linux was made available as a preinstalled option from a major hardware vendor. Following that, Lenovo then began making Ubuntu available as a preinstalled option across nearly thirty different notebook and desktop models, and Fedora Linux on all of its P series lineup.

A small number of ThinkPads, such as the C14, are preinstalled with Google's ChromeOS, and are essentially ThinkPad-branded Chromebooks. On these devices, ChromeOS is the only officially supported operating system where installation of Windows and other operating systems requires putting the device into developer mode, as is the case with other Chromebooks.

== Use in space ==
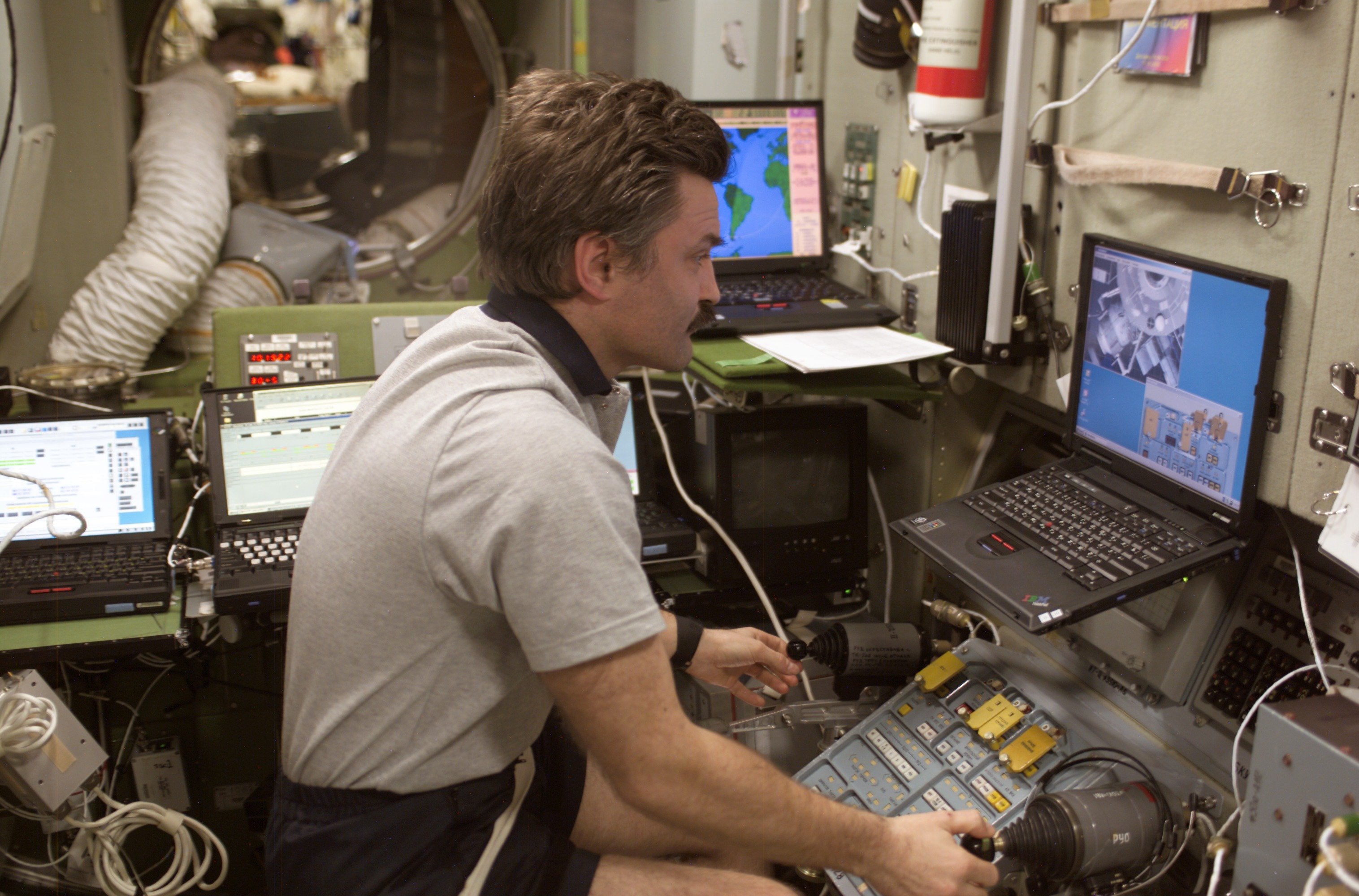
ThinkPads in use aboard the International Space Station, including 760, 770, and A21p models (2004)

ThinkPads have been used heavily in space programs. NASA purchased more than 500 ThinkPad 750 laptops for flight qualification, software development, and crew training, and astronaut John Glenn used ThinkPad laptops on his spaceflight mission STS-95 in 1998.

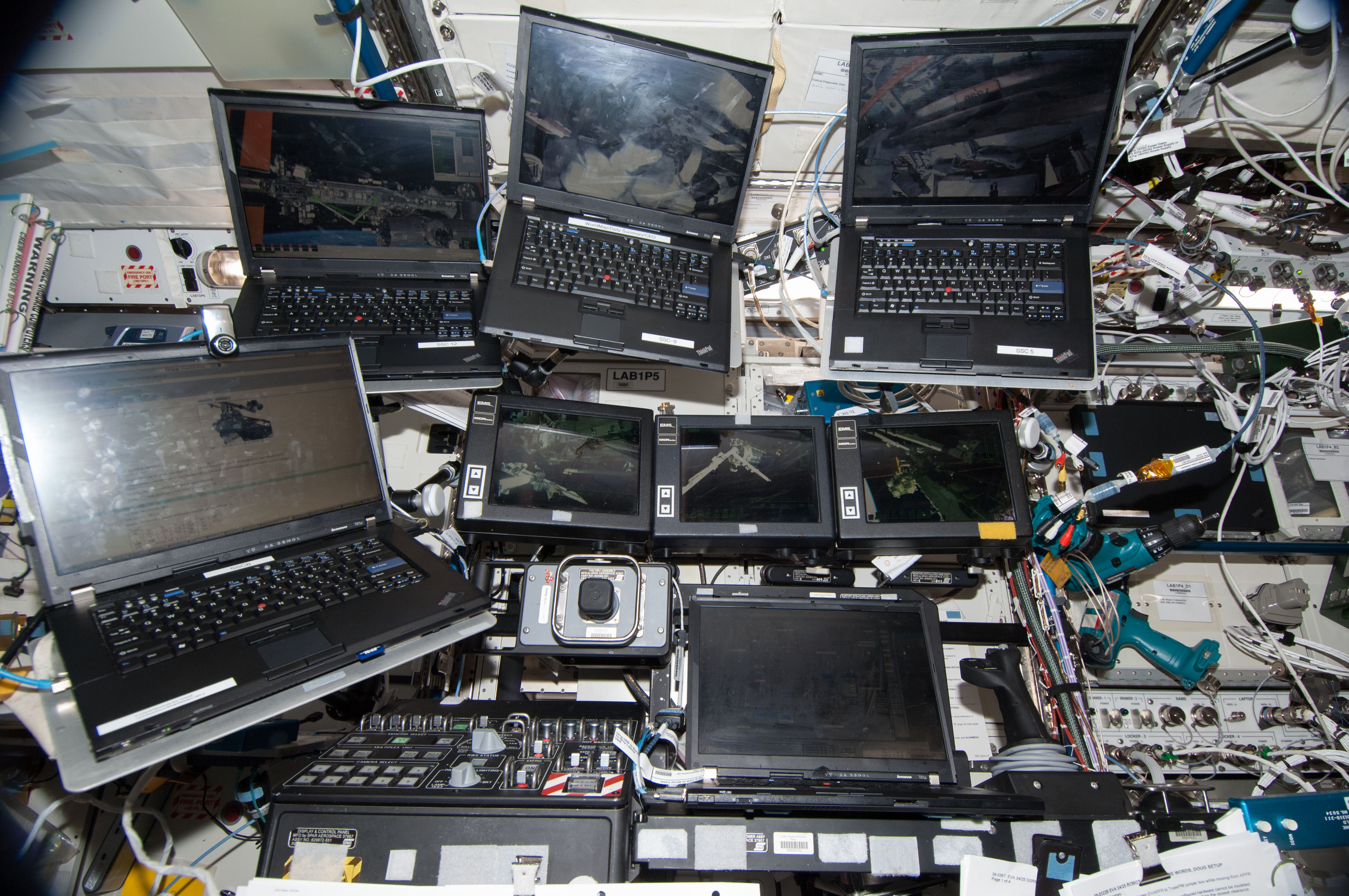
An array of ISS laptops in the US lab (2013)

ThinkPad models used on Shuttle missions include:

- ThinkPad 750 (first used in December 1993 supporting the Hubble repair mission)
- ThinkPad 750C
- ThinkPad 755C
- ThinkPad 760ED
- ThinkPad 760XD (ISS Portable Computing System)
- ThinkPad 770
- ThinkPad A31p (ISS Portable Computing System)
- ThinkPad T61p
- ThinkPad P52
- ThinkPad T490
- ThinkPad P15

The ThinkPad 750 flew aboard the Space Shuttle Endeavour during a mission to repair the Hubble Space Telescope on 2 December 1993, running a NASA test program that checked if radiation in the space environment caused memory anomalies or other unexpected problems. ThinkPads were also used in conjunction with a joystick for the Portable In-Flight Landing Operations Trainer (PILOT).

ThinkPads have also been used on space stations. At least three ThinkPad 750C were left in the Spektr module of Mir when it depressurized, and the 755C and 760ED were used as part of the Shuttle–Mir Program, the 760ED without modifications. Additionally, for several decades ThinkPads were the only laptops certified for use on the International Space Station.

ThinkPads used aboard the space shuttle and International Space Station feature safety and operational improvements for the environment they must operate in. Modifications include Velcro tape to attach to surfaces, upgrades to the CPU and video card cooling fans to accommodate for microgravity (in which warmer air does not rise) and lower density of the cabin air, and an adapter for the station's 28-volt DC power.

Throughout 2006, a ThinkPad A31p was being used in the Service Module Central Post of the International Space Station and seven ThinkPad A31p laptops were in service in orbit aboard the International Space Station. As of 2010, the Space Station was equipped with ThinkPad A31 computers and 32 ThinkPad T61p laptops. All laptops aboard the ISS are connected to the station's LAN via Wi-Fi and are connected to the ground at 3 Mbit/s up and 10 Mbit/s down, comparable to home DSL connection speeds.

Since a new contract with HP in 2016 provided a small number of modified ZBook laptops for ISS use, ThinkPads are no longer the only laptops flown on the ISS; however, they are the predominant laptop present there.

== Popularity ==
The brand has developed a cult following amongst computer enthusiasts since its inception. Older ThinkPad models remain popular among enthusiasts and collectors, who still see them as durable, highly usable machines despite their age and technology. They are also popular with modders due to older ThinkPad models having easy access to their internals, with most parts such as the RAM, SSD, and WWAN not being soldered into the computer. Some ThinkPads, such as the X220 and T440p, are notable for being able to run coreboot.

Aftermarket parts have been developed for some models, such as the X60 and X200, for which custom motherboards with more modern processors have been created.

In January 2015, Lenovo celebrated selling its one hundred millionth ThinkPad.

== Reviews and awards ==
Laptop Magazine in 2006 called the ThinkPad the highest-quality laptop computer keyboard available. It was ranked first in reliability and support in PC Magazine's 2007 Survey.

The ThinkPad was the PC Magazine 2006 Reader's Choice for PC-based laptops, and ranked number 1 in Support for PC-based laptops. The ThinkPad Series was the first product to receive PC World's Hall of Fame award.

The Enderle Group's Rob Enderle said that the constant thing about ThinkPad is that the "brand stands for quality" and that "they build the best keyboard in the business."

The ThinkPad X Tablet series was PC Magazine Editor's Choice for tablet PCs. The 1.6 kg (3.5 lb) ThinkPad X60s was ranked number one in ultraportable laptops by PC World. It lasted 8 hours and 21 minutes on a single charge with its 8-cell battery. The Lenovo ThinkPad X60s Series is on PC World's Top 100 Products of 2006. The 2005 PC World Reliability and Service survey ranked ThinkPad products ahead of all other brands for reliability.

In the 2004 survey, they were ranked second (behind eMachines). Lenovo was named the most environment-friendly company in the electronics industry by Greenpeace in 2007 but has since dropped to place 14 of 17 as of October 2010.

The IBM/Lenovo ThinkPad T60p received the Editor's Choice award for Mobile Graphic Workstation from PC Magazine. Lenovo ThinkPad X60 is the PC Magazine Editor's Choice among ultra-portable laptops. The Lenovo ThinkPad T400 series was on PC World's Top 100 Products of 2009.

== Current model lines ==
ThinkPad global latest lineup (2024)
Screen size			13.3″	14.1″	15.6″	16″
Entry-level/small business (E series)
Entry	Transitional Basic	Intel		E14 Gen 6		E16 Gen 2
Entry	Transitional Basic	AMD		E14 Gen 6		E16 Gen 2
Mid-range (L series)
Mid	Transitional Basic	Intel	L13 Gen 5	L14 Gen 5		L16 Gen 1
Mid	Modern Basic	AMD	L13 Gen 5	L14 Gen 5		L16 Gen 1
Mid	Convertible		L13 Yoga Gen 4			
Premium (T and X series)
Premium	Value Regular			T14 Gen 5		T16 Gen 3
Premium	Subcompact Basic	Intel		T14s Gen 5		
Premium	Subcompact Basic	AMD		T14s Gen 5		
Premium	Superslim Basic	Intel	X13 Gen 5			
Premium	Superslim Basic	AMD	X13 Gen 5			
Premium	Superslim Basic	Snapdragon	X13s Gen 1			
Premium	Superslim Convertible		X13 Yoga Gen 4			
Top (X1 and Z series)
Top	Slim regular	AMD	Z13 Gen 2			Z16 Gen 2
Top	Superslim (Intel)	Basic		X1 Carbon Gen 12		
Top	Superslim (Intel)	Convertible		X1 2-in-1 (Gen 9)		
Top	Ultraslim Basic		X1 Nano Gen 3			
Top	Ultraminimal Foldable					X1 Fold Gen 1
Mobile Workstation (P series)
Mobile Workstation	Modular Performance					P16 Gen 2
Mobile Workstation	Slim Regular			P14s Gen 6		P16s Gen 3
Mobile Workstation	Value Regular					P16v Gen 2
Mobile Workstation	Subcompact Basic					P1 Gen 7

Current non-global offered models (or not distributed anymore in some major markets); old models with local availability.

ThinkPad local/legacy lineup (2020)
			11.6"	12.5"	13"	13.3"	14"	15.6"	17.3"
Entry	Versatile Basic	Intel					E480	E580	
Entry	Versatile Basic	Intel					E490	E590	
Entry	Versatile Basic	AMD					E485		
Entry	Versatile Basic	AMD					E495	E595	
Entry	Modern Basic						E490s		
Entry	Slim Basic					13 ^{Gen1}			
Entry	Slim Basic					13 ^{Gen2}			
Entry	Chromebook					13 Chromebook			
Entry	Leaner Basic		11e ^{Gen4}						
Entry	Minimal Convertible Chromebook		11e Yoga Chromebook ^{Gen4}						
Mid	Classic Basic						L470	L570	
Mid	Transitional Basic						L480	L580	
Mid	Transitional Basic						L490	L590	
Mid	Slim	Basic				L380			
Mid	Slim	Basic				L390			
Mid	Slim	Convertible				L380 Yoga			
Mid	Slim	Convertible				L390 Yoga			
Premium	Classic Basic	Intel					T480	T580	
Premium	Classic Basic	AMD					A485		
Premium	Subcompact Basic	Intel					T480s		
Premium	Subcompact Basic	Intel					T490	T590	
Premium	Subcompact Basic	Intel					T490^{Secure Access / Healthcare Edition}		
Premium	Subcompact Basic	AMD					T495		
Premium	Lean Basic	Intel		X270					
Premium	Lean Basic	AMD		A275					
Premium	Superslim Basic	Intel		X280		X390	T490s		
Premium	Superslim Basic	AMD		A285		X395	T495s		
Premium	Superslim Convertible					X380 Yoga			
Premium	Superslim Convertible					X390 Yoga			
Top	Slim Regular							X1 Extreme ^{Gen1}	
Top	Slim Regular							X1 Extreme ^{Gen2}	
Top	Superslim	Basic					X1 Carbon ^{Gen6}		
Top	Superslim	Basic					X1 Carbon ^{Gen7}		
Top	Superslim	Convertible					X1 Yoga ^{Gen3}		
Top	Superslim	Convertible					X1 Yoga ^{Gen4}		
Top	Ultraslim Detachable				X1 Tablet ^{Gen3}				
Mobile Workstation	Performance	Ultraversatile						P50	
Mobile Workstation	Performance	Ultraversatile						P52	
Mobile Workstation	Performance	Superversatile							P72
Mobile Workstation	Performance	Superversatile						P53	P73
Mobile Workstation	Slim Regular							P1 ^{Gen1}	
Mobile Workstation	Slim Regular							P1 ^{Gen2}	
Mobile Workstation	Slim Regular							P1 ^{Gen3}	
Mobile Workstation	Subcompact Basic						P43s	P53s	
Mobile Workstation	Slim Lean Convertible						P40 Yoga		

=== ThinkPad Yoga (2013–current) ===
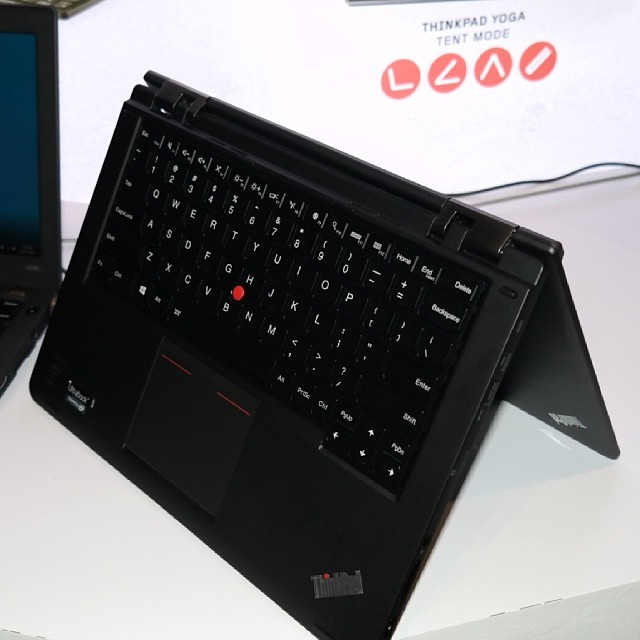
A ThinkPad Yoga in tent mode

The ThinkPad Yoga is an Ultrabook-class convertible device that functions as both a laptop and tablet computer. The Yoga gets its name from the consumer-oriented IdeaPad Yoga line of computers with the same form factor. The ThinkPad Yoga has a backlit keyboard that flattens when flipped into tablet mode. This was accomplished on the 1st generation X1 Yoga with a platform surrounding the keys that rise until level with the keyboard buttons, a locking mechanism that prevents key presses, and feet that pop out to prevent the keyboard from directly resting on flat surfaces. On later X1 Yoga generations, the keys themselves retract in the chassis, so the computer rests on fixed small pads. The touchpad is disabled in this configuration. Lenovo implemented this design in response to complaints about its earlier Yoga 13 and 11 models being awkward to use in tablet mode. A reinforced hinge was required to implement this design. Other than its convertible form factor, the ThinkPad Yoga retains standard ThinkPad features such as a black magnesium-reinforced chassis, an island keyboard, a red TrackPoint, and a large touchpad.

=== Tablets ===
==== ThinkPad Tablet ====
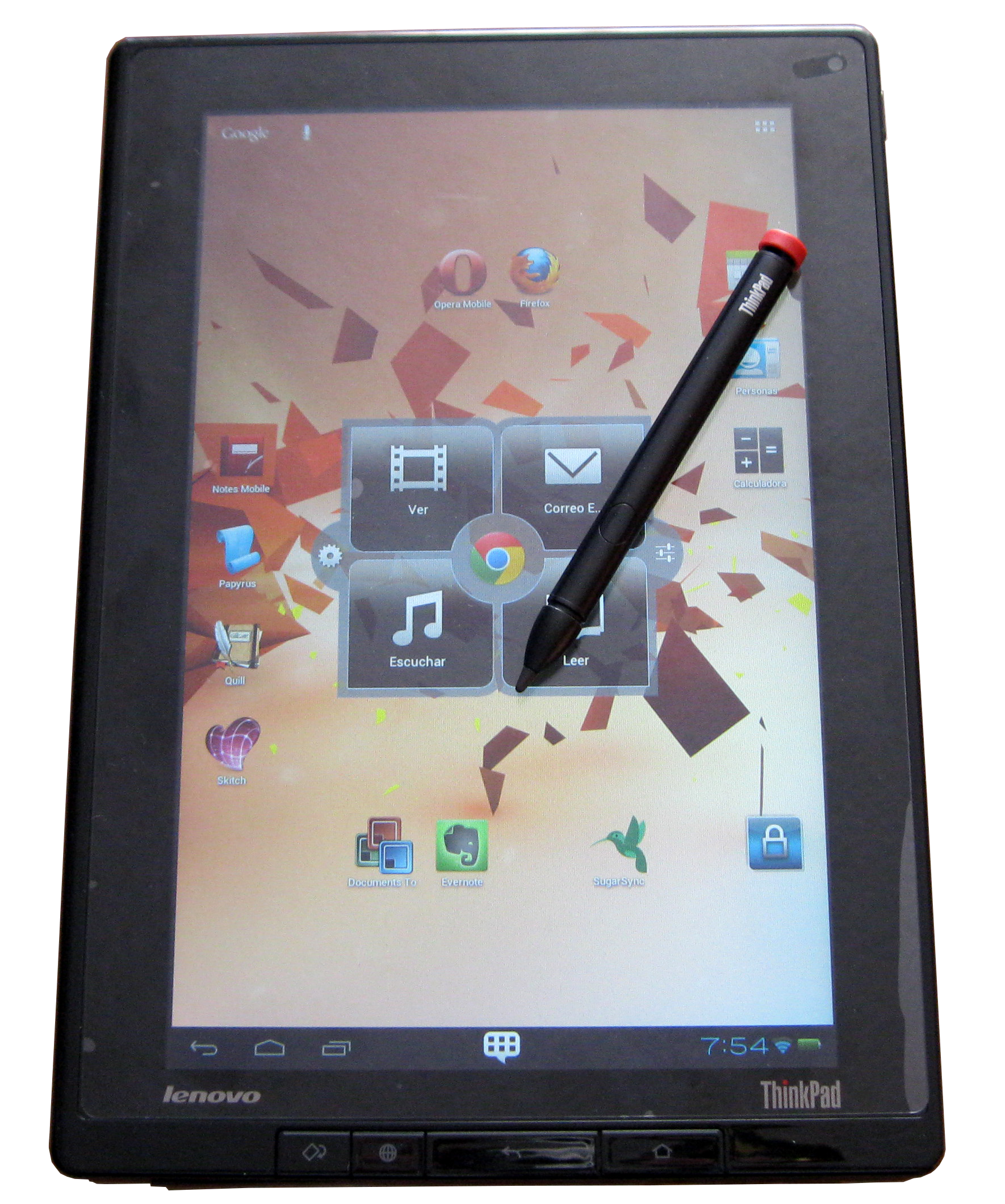
Lenovo ThinkPad Tablet

Released in August 2011, the ThinkPad Tablet is the first in Lenovo's line of business-oriented Tablets with the ThinkPad brand. The tablet has been described by Gadget Mix as a premium business tablet. Since the Tablet is primarily business-oriented, it includes features for security, such as anti-theft software, the ability to remotely disable the tablet, SD card encryption, layered data encryption, and Cisco Virtual Private Network (VPN).

Additionally, the ThinkPad Tablet can run software such as IBM's Lotus Notes Traveler. The stylus could be used to write notes on the Tablet, which also included software to convert this handwritten content to text. Another feature on the Tablet was a drag-and-drop utility designed to take advantage of the Tablet's touch capabilities. This feature could be used to transfer data between USB devices, internal storage, or an SD card.

Slashgear summarized the ThinkPad Tablet by saying, "The stylus and the styling add up to a distinctive slate that doesn't merely attempt to ape Apple's iPad."

==== ThinkPad Tablet 2 ====
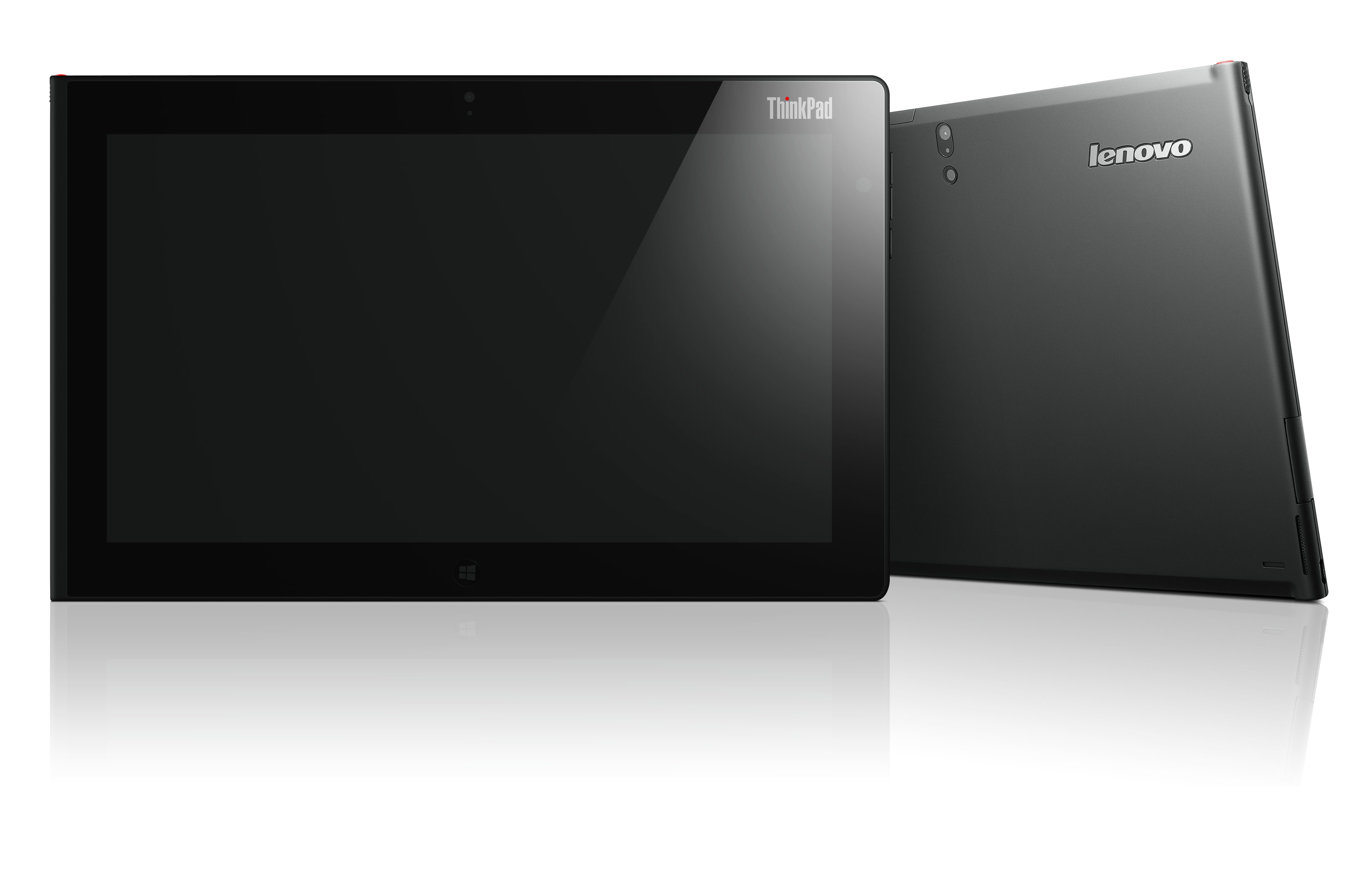
Lenovo ThinkPad Tablet 2

To celebrate the 20th anniversary of the ThinkPad, Lenovo held a large party in New York where it announced several products, including the Tablet 2. Lenovo says that the ThinkPad Tablet 2 will be available on 28 October 2012 when Windows 8 is released. The ThinkPad Tablet 2 runs the Windows 8 Pro operating system. It can run any desktop software compatible with this version of Windows.

The Tablet 2 is based on the Clover Trail version of the Intel Atom processor that has been customized for tablets. The Tablet 2 has 2 gigabytes of RAM and a 64 GB SSD. The Tablet 2 has a 10.1-inch IPS display with a 16:9 aspect ratio and a resolution of 1366 × 768. In a preview, CNET wrote, "Windows 8 looked readable and functional, both in Metro and standard Windows-based interfaces." A mini-HDMI port is included for video output. An 8-megapixel rear camera and a 2-megapixel front camera are included along with a noise-canceling microphone to facilitate video conferencing.

==== ThinkPad 8 ====
Announced and released in January 2014, the ThinkPad 8 is based on Intel's Bay Trail Atom Z3770 processor, with 2 GB of RAM and up to 128 GB of built-in storage. ThinkPad 8 has an 8.3-inch IPS display with a 16:10 aspect ratio and a resolution of 1920 × 1200 pixels. Other features include an aluminum chassis, micro-HDMI port, 8-megapixel back camera (with flash), and optional 4G connectivity. It runs Windows 8.1 as an operating system.

==== ThinkPad 10 ====
Announced in May 2014, Lenovo ThinkPad 10 is a 10" successor to the ThinkPad Tablet 2 and was scheduled to launch in the summer of 2014 along with accessories such as a docking station and external detachable magnetic keyboards. It used Windows 8.1 Pro as its operating system. It was available in 64 and 128 GB variants with 1.6 GHz quad-core Intel Atom Baytrail processor and 2 GB or 4 GB of RAM. It optionally supports both 3G and 4G (LTE). Display resolution was announced to be 1920 × 1200, paired with a stylus pen.

==== ThinkPad X1 Tablet ====
The ThinkPad X1 Tablet is a fanless tablet powered by Core M CPUs. It is available with 4, 8 or 16 GB of LPDDR3 RAM and SATA or a PCIe NVMe SSDs with up to 1 TB. It has a 2160 × 1440 IPS screen and supports touch and pen input.

=== E series (2011–current) ===
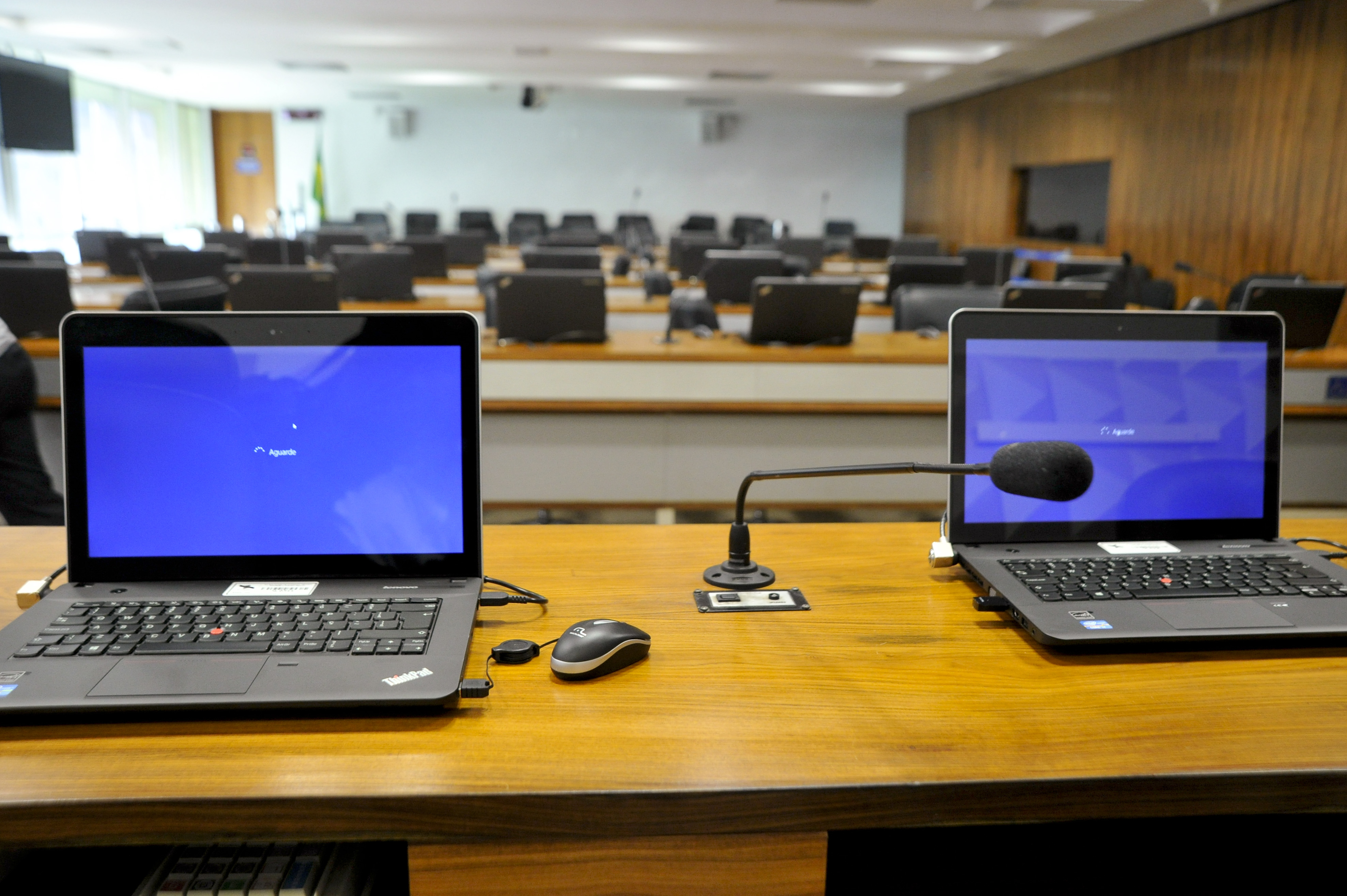
Two E series ThinkPad's (E440)

The E series is a low-cost ThinkPad line, designed for small business mass-market requirements, and currently contains only a 14" and 16" sub-lines. The E series line of laptops replaced Lenovo's Edge series, but somewhere (in some countries) currently offered as both of "ThinkPad Edge/E series" names. The E series also lack metals like magnesium and carbon fiber in their construction which other members of the ThinkPad family enjoy.

=== L series (2010–current) ===
The L series replaced the former R series, and is positioned as a mid-range ThinkPad offering with mainstream Intel Core i3/i5/i7 CPUs. The L Series have 3 sub-lines, the long-running 14" and 15.6" (and as launched this line had two models, L412 and the L512 in 2010); and as of 2018 there is also a 13" L380 available, which replaces the ThinkPad 13.

=== T series (2000–current) ===
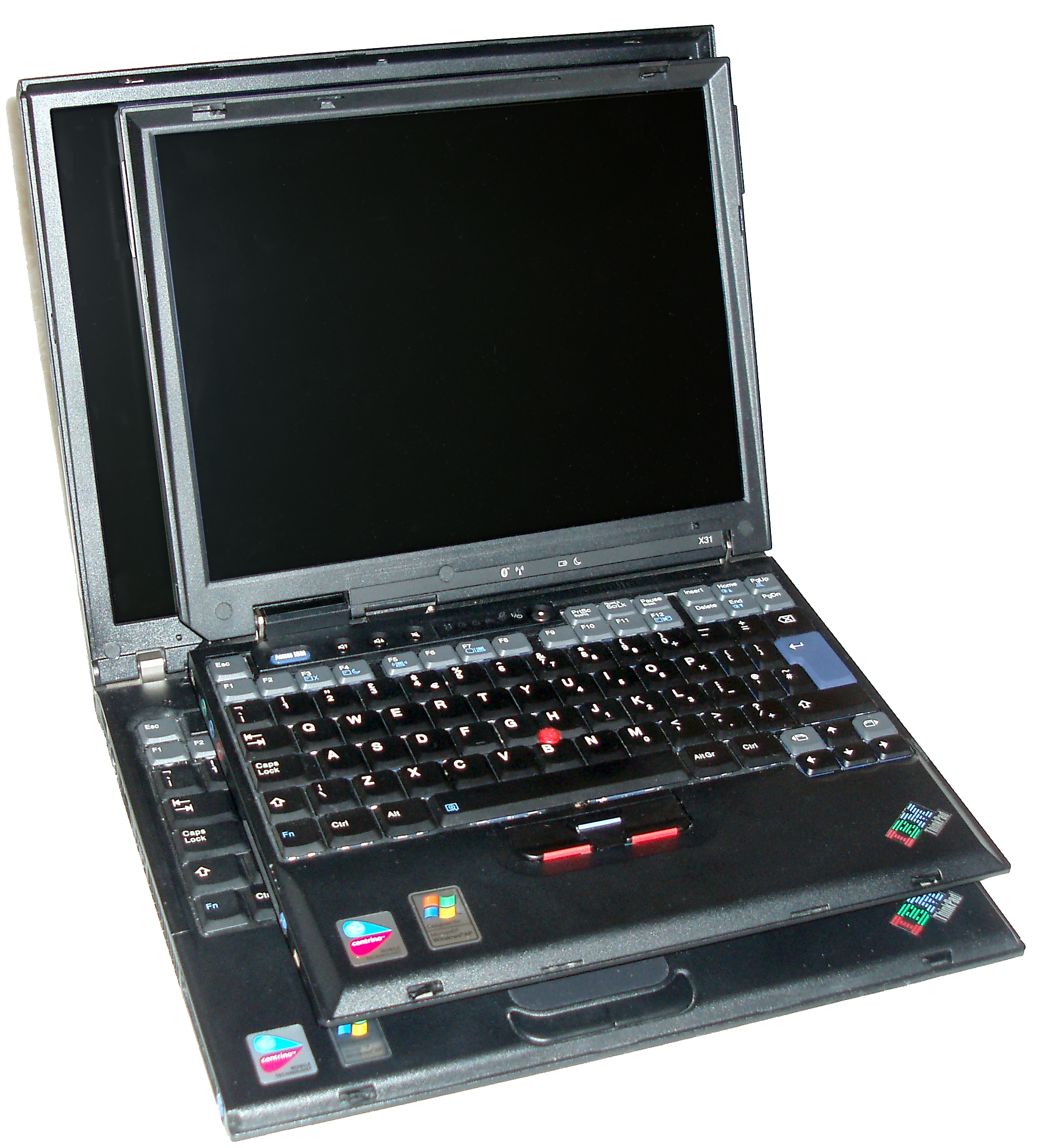
An ultraportable IBM X31 with a ThinkPad T43 notebook

The T series historically had high-end features, such as magnesium alloy roll-cages, high-density IPS screens known as FlexView (discontinued after the T60 series), 7-row keyboards, screen latches, the UltraBay, and ThinkLight. Models included both 14.1-inch and 15.4-inch displays available in 4:3 and 16:10 aspect ratios.

Since 2012, the entire ThinkPad line was given a complete overhaul, with modifications such as the removal of separate buttons for use with the TrackPoint (xx40 series – 2014, then reintroduced xx50 series – 2015), removal of separate audio control buttons, removal of screen latch, and the removal of LED indicator lights. Models starting from the xx40 series featured a Power Bridge battery system, which had a combination of a lower capacity built-in battery and a higher capacity external battery, enabling the user to switch the external without putting the computer into hibernation. However, beginning with the 2019 xx90 series models, the external battery was removed in favor of a single internal battery. Also, non-widescreen displays are no longer available, with 16:9 aspect ratio as the only remaining choice.

The Tx20 series ThinkPads came in two editions: 15" (T520) or a 14" (T420). These are the last ThinkPads to use the classic 7-row keyboard, with the exception of the Lenovo ThinkPad 25th anniversary edition released on Oct. 5, 2017, which was based on the T470.

Over time, The T series ThinkPad's purpose has changed. Initially, the T series ThinkPad was meant to have high-end business features and carry a 10–20% markup over the other ThinkPads. Starting with the T400, the ThinkPad T series became less of a high-end business laptop and became more suited as a mobile workstation, becoming similar to the W series or P series ThinkPads. Achieving similar performance to the W series, but with a 5–10% smaller profile than the W series ThinkPads. In 2013, the T440 introduced another major shift in The ThinkPad T series. The ThinkPad became more of an overall office machine than a mobile workstation. By today's standards, The ThinkPad T series is thicker than most of its competitors.

=== X series (2000–current) ===
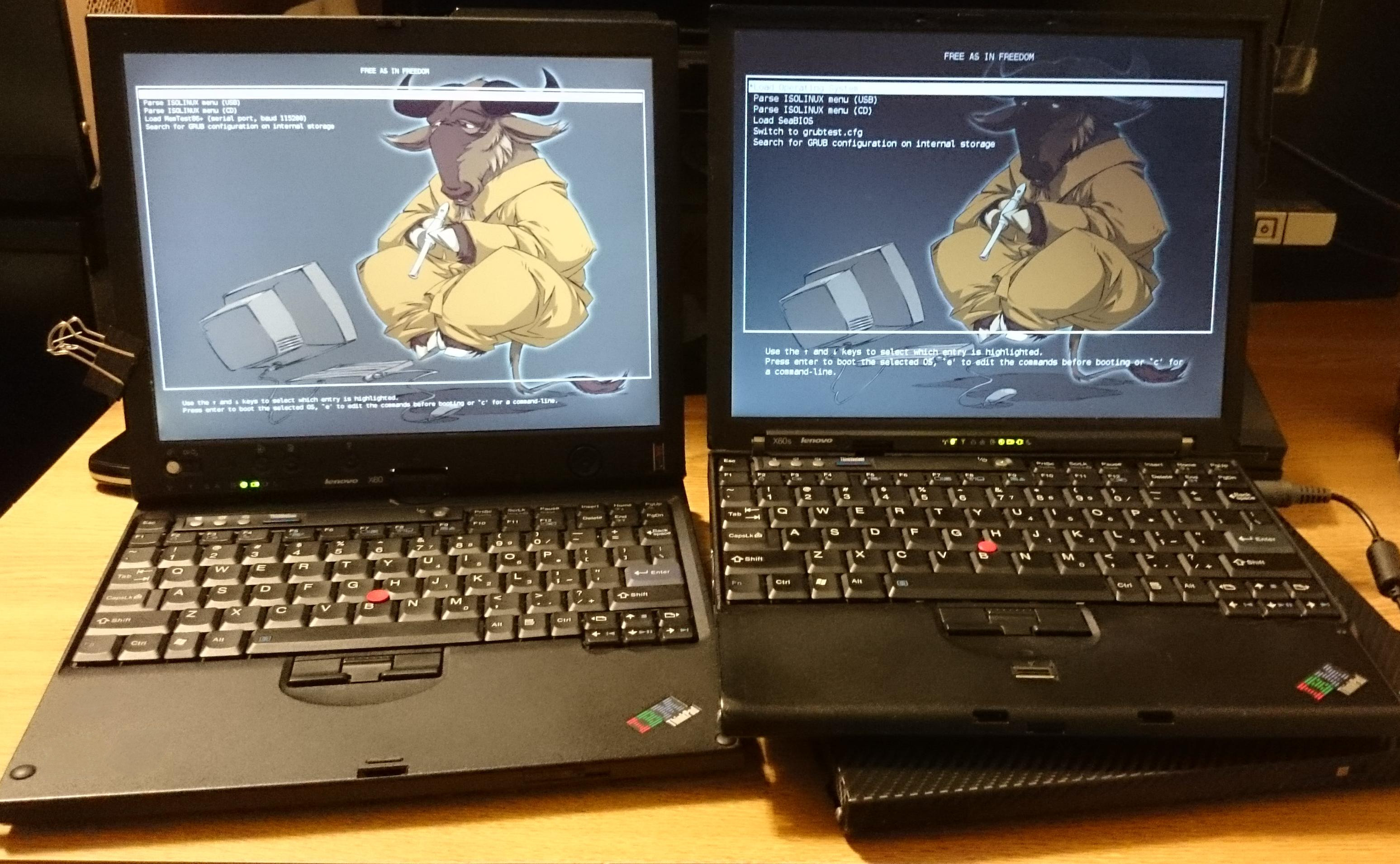
Two X60 units (Tablet and slim non-Tablet versions) running Libreboot

The X series is the main high-end ultraportable ThinkPad line, offering a lightweight, highly portable laptop with moderate performance. The current sub-lines for the X series includes:

- 12" X12 (detachable tablet);
- 13" X13 (mainstream),
  - X13 2-in-1 (convertible sub-line);
- 14" X1 Carbon (premium sub-line),
  - X1 2-in-1 (premium convertible sub-line),
  - X9 14 (premium sub-line);
- 15" X9 15 (premium sub-line);
- 16" X1 Fold (foldable screen device).

The daughter line includes the X1 Tablet (not to be confused with the 2005–2013 X Series tablets).

The mainstream current "workhorse" models is a X13 and X13 Yoga, the 13" successors of the classic discontinued 12" line of Lenovo X Series ThinkPads.

The premium X1 thin-and-light line were the 13.3" ThinkPad models (the X300, X301, and X1) with Ultrabay Thin CD-ROM and removable battery, but are now replaced by the modern premium X1 series ultrabook line, such as the X1 Carbon, X1 Yoga, and X1 Nano sub series.

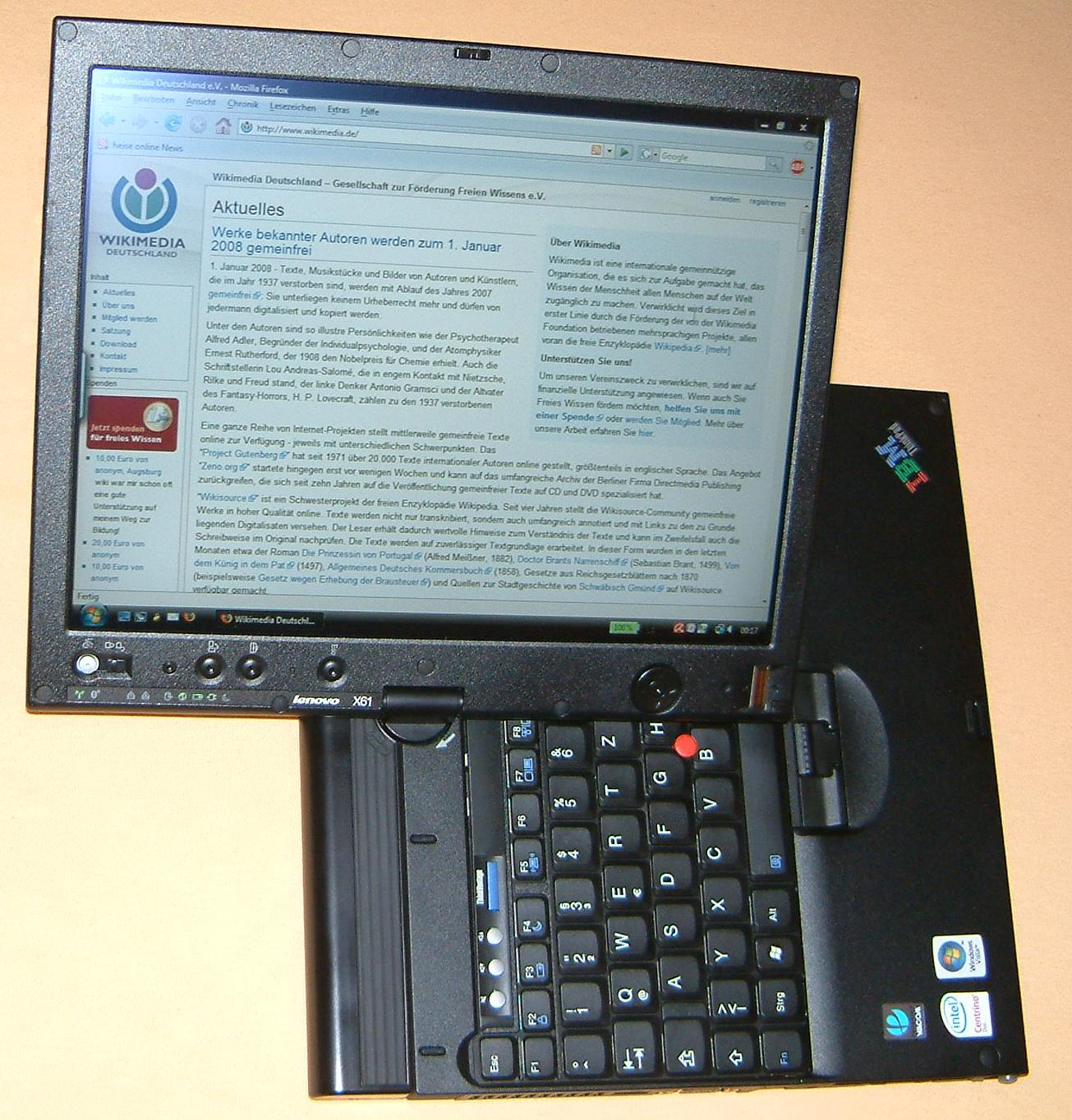
IBM ThinkPad X61t, the classic "Tablet" laptop

The premium X9 line was introduced in 2025 with 14" and 15" models. The X9 series is notable for not featuring traditional ThinkPad features such as the TrackPoint, keyboard and dedicated trackpad buttons.

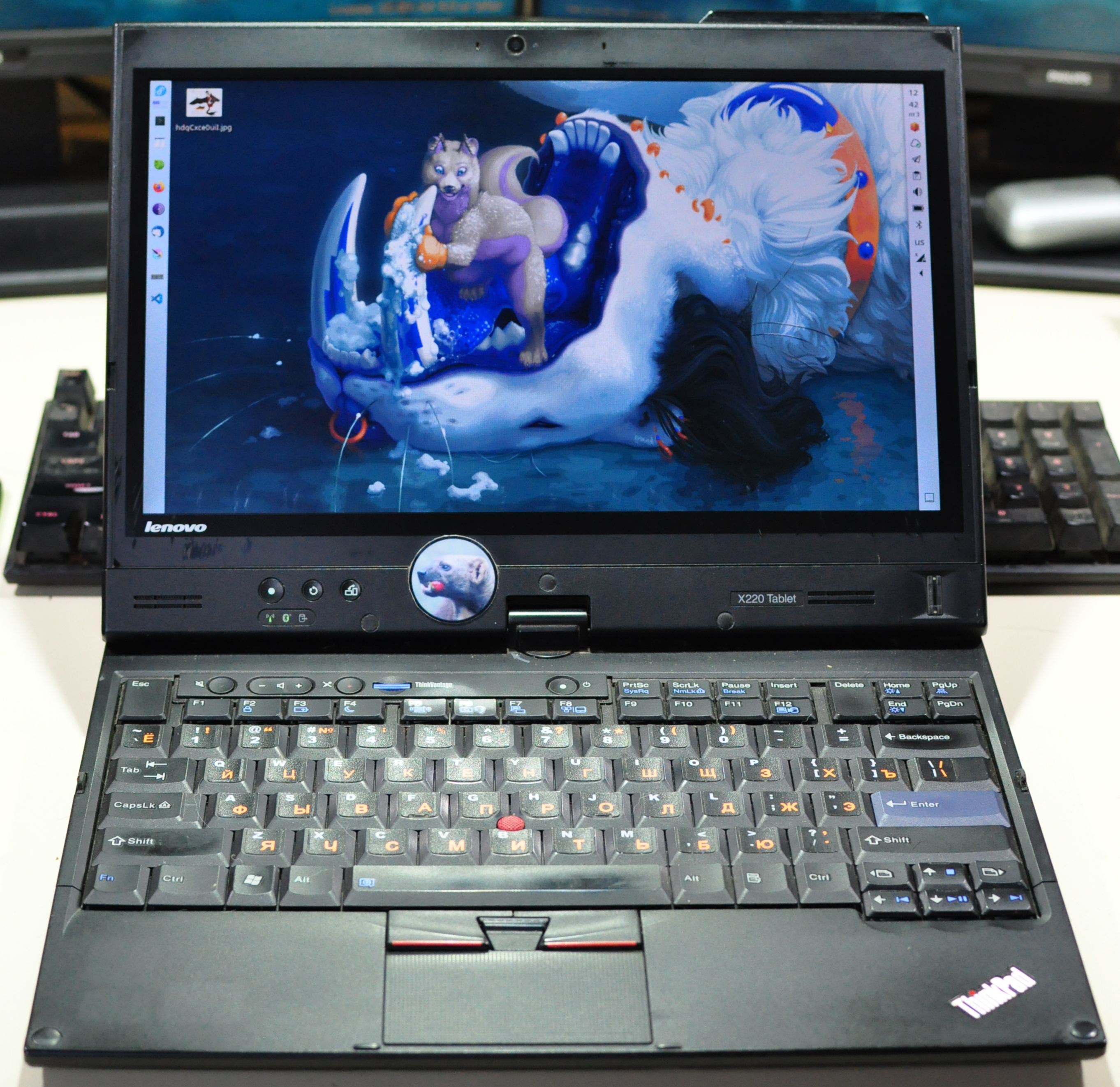
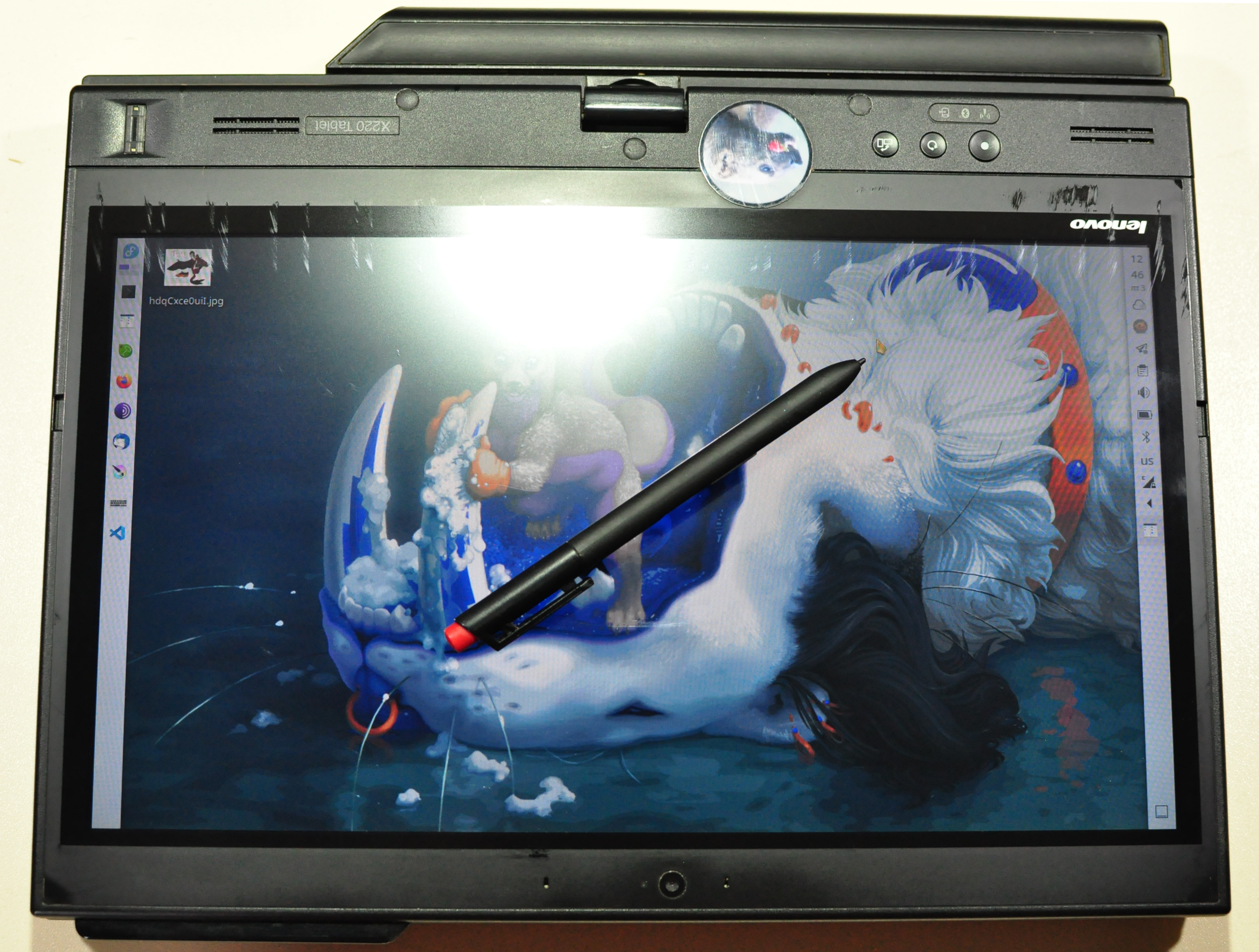
ThinkPad X220 Tablet in laptop and tablet mode

Discontinued mainstream lines such as the 12" X200(s), X201(s), and X220 models could be ordered with all of the high-end ThinkPad features (like TrackPoint, ThinkLight, a 7-row keyboard, a docking port, hot-swappable HDD, solid magnesium case and optional slice battery). The discontinued 12.5" X220 and X230 still featured a roll cage, a ThinkLight, and an optional premium IPS display (the first IPS display on a non-tablet ThinkPad since the T60p), but the 7-row keyboard was offered only with the X220. However, it lacked the lid latch mechanism which was present on the previous X200 and X201 versions. The discontinued slim 12" line contained only X200s and X201s with low power CPUs and high resolution displays, and X230s with low power CPUs. The 12.5" X series ThinkPads (such as X240 and later) had a more simplified design, and last 12" X280 model had only the Trackpoint feature, partially magnesium case and simplified docking port.

The obsolete low-cost 11.6" (netbook line) X100e and X120e were are all plastic, lacking both the latch and the ThinkLight, and using a variant of the island keyboard (known as chiclet keyboard) found on the Edge series. The X100e was also offered in red in addition to blue, and white in some countries. Those were more like high-end netbooks, whereas the X200 series were more like full ultraportables, featuring Intel Core (previously Core 2 and Celeron) series CPUs rather than AMD netbook CPUs.

The X Series with "tablet" suffixes is an outdated variant of the 12" X Series models, with low voltage CPUs and a flip-screen tablet resistive touchscreen. These include the traditional ThinkPad features, and have been noted for using a higher quality AFFS-type screen with better viewing angles compared to the screens used on other ThinkPads.

=== P series (2015–current) ===
The P Series line of laptops replaced the W series and reintroduced 17.3" screens to the ThinkPad line. The P Series (excluding models with 's' suffix) is designed for engineers, architects, animators, etc. and comes with a variety of "high-end" options. All P series models come included with fingerprint readers. The P series includes features such as dedicated magnesium roll cages, more indicator LED lights, and high-resolution displays.

=== Z series (2022–present) ===
The Z series currently consists of two models: the 13-inch model, Z13, and the 16-inch model, Z16. It was introduced in January 2022 . The series is marketed towards business customers, as well as a generally younger audience. The Verge wrote: "Lenovo is trying to make ThinkPads cool to the kids. The company has launched the ThinkPad Z series, a thin and light ThinkPad line with funky colors, eco-friendly packaging, and a distinctly modern look." The series features a new metal sleek, contemporary, thin design, which differs greatly from other recent, more traditional-looking ThinkPad models. The Z13 model was introduced in three new colors—black, silver, and black vegan leather with bronze accents—while the Z16 is only available in one of them, silver. The laptops are equipped with AMD Ryzen PRO processors. Other notable features include 1080p webcams, OLED displays, new, redesigned touchpads, spill resistant keyboards, Dolby Atmos speaker systems, and Windows 11 with Windows Hello support.

== Historical models ==
=== ThinkPad 130 ===
IBM's ThinkPad 130 was a low-cost laptop computer released in 1996, made for IBM by Acer. It was an extremely short lived model of the otherwise unheard of 100-Series, which was simply a re-badged low cost, high volume, multimedia iSeries machine.

=== ThinkPad 235 ===
The Japan-only ThinkPad 235 (or Type 2607) was the progeny of the IBM/Ricoh RIOS project. Also known as Clavius or Chandra2, it contains unusual features like the presence of three PCMCIA slots and the use of dual camcorder batteries as a source of power. Features an Intel Pentium MMX 233 MHz CPU, support for up to 160 MB of EDO memory, and a built-in 2.5 in (64 mm) hard drive with UDMA support. Hitachi marketed Chandra2 as the Prius Note 210.

=== ThinkPad 240 ===
The ultraportable ThinkPad 240 (X, Z) started with an Intel Celeron processor and went up to the 600 MHz Intel Pentium III. In models using the Intel 440BX chipset, the RAM was expandable to 320 MB max with a BIOS update. Models had a 10.4 in (260 mm) screen and an 18 mm (0.71 in) key pitch (a standard key pitch is 19 mm (0.75 in)). They were also one of the first ThinkPad series to contain a built-in Mini PCI card slot (form factor 3b). The 240s have no optical disc drives and an external floppy drive. An optional extended battery sticks out the bottom like a bar and props up the back of the laptop. Weighing in at 2.9 lb (1.3 kg), these were the smallest and lightest ThinkPads ever made.

=== 300 series ===
The 300 series (300, 310, 340, 345, 350, 360, 365, 370, 380, 385, 390 (all with various sub series)) was a long-running value series starting at the 386SL/25 processor, all the way to the Pentium III 450. The 300 series was offered as a slightly lower-price alternative from the 700 series, with a few exceptions.

The ThinkPad 360P and 360PE was a low-end version of ThinkPad 750P, and was unique model in the 300 series in that it could be used as a regular laptop, or transform into a tablet by flipping the monitor on top of itself. Retailing for $3,699 in 1995, the 360PE featured a touch sensitive monitor that operated with the stylus; the machine could run operating systems that supported the touch screen such as PenDOS 2.2.

The 300 series was succeeded by the A##m series.

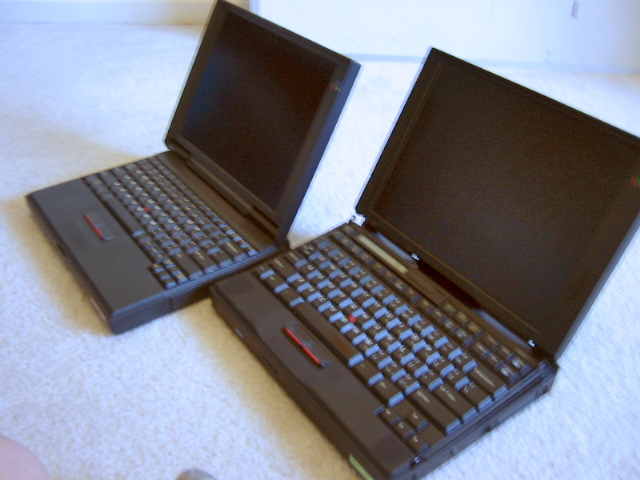
An IBM ThinkPad 310ED and a 760ED, both from the 1996–97 era. The 760ED boasts the unique flip-up keyboard that was standard on all 760 ThinkPads.

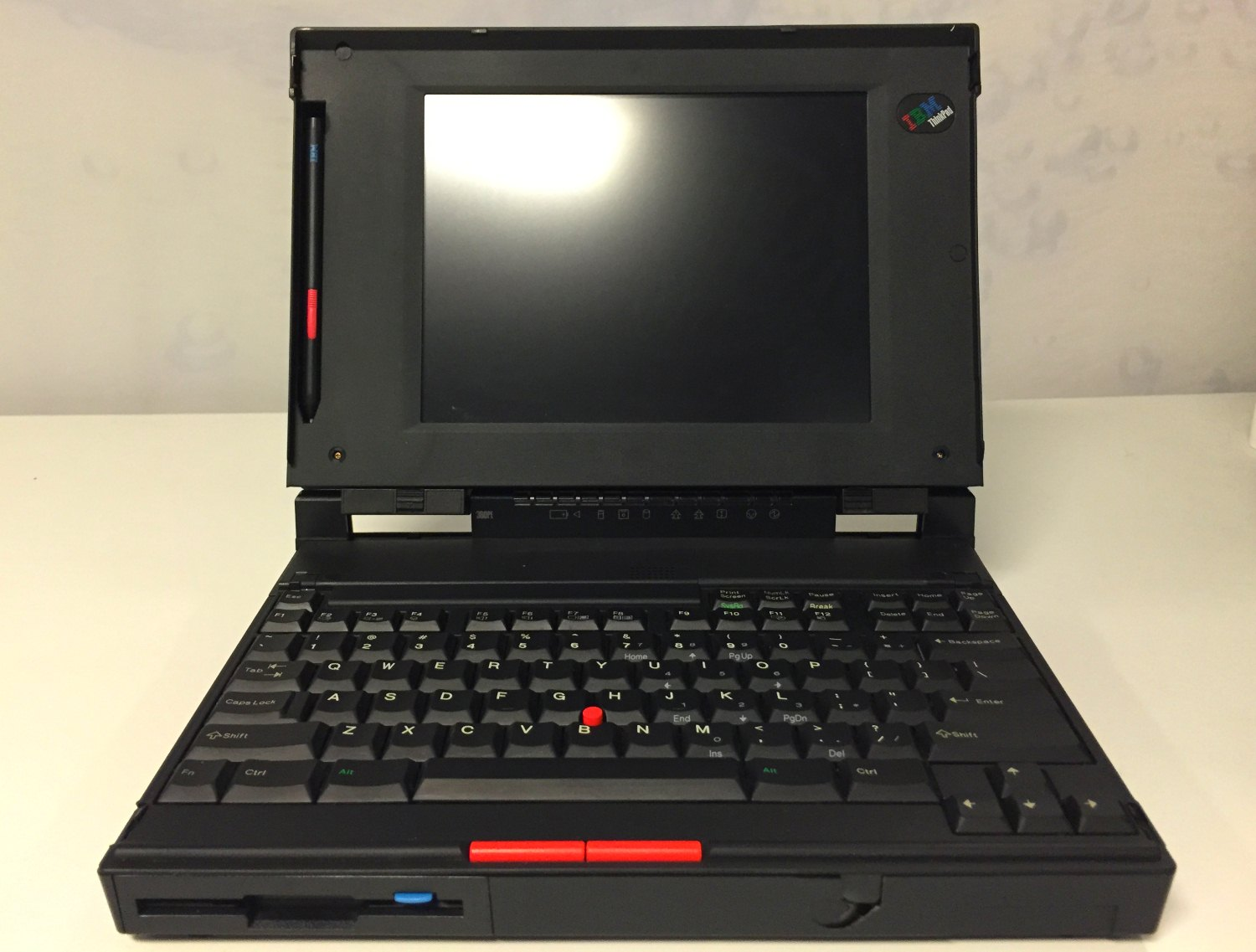
The 360PE opened in its 'natural' mode

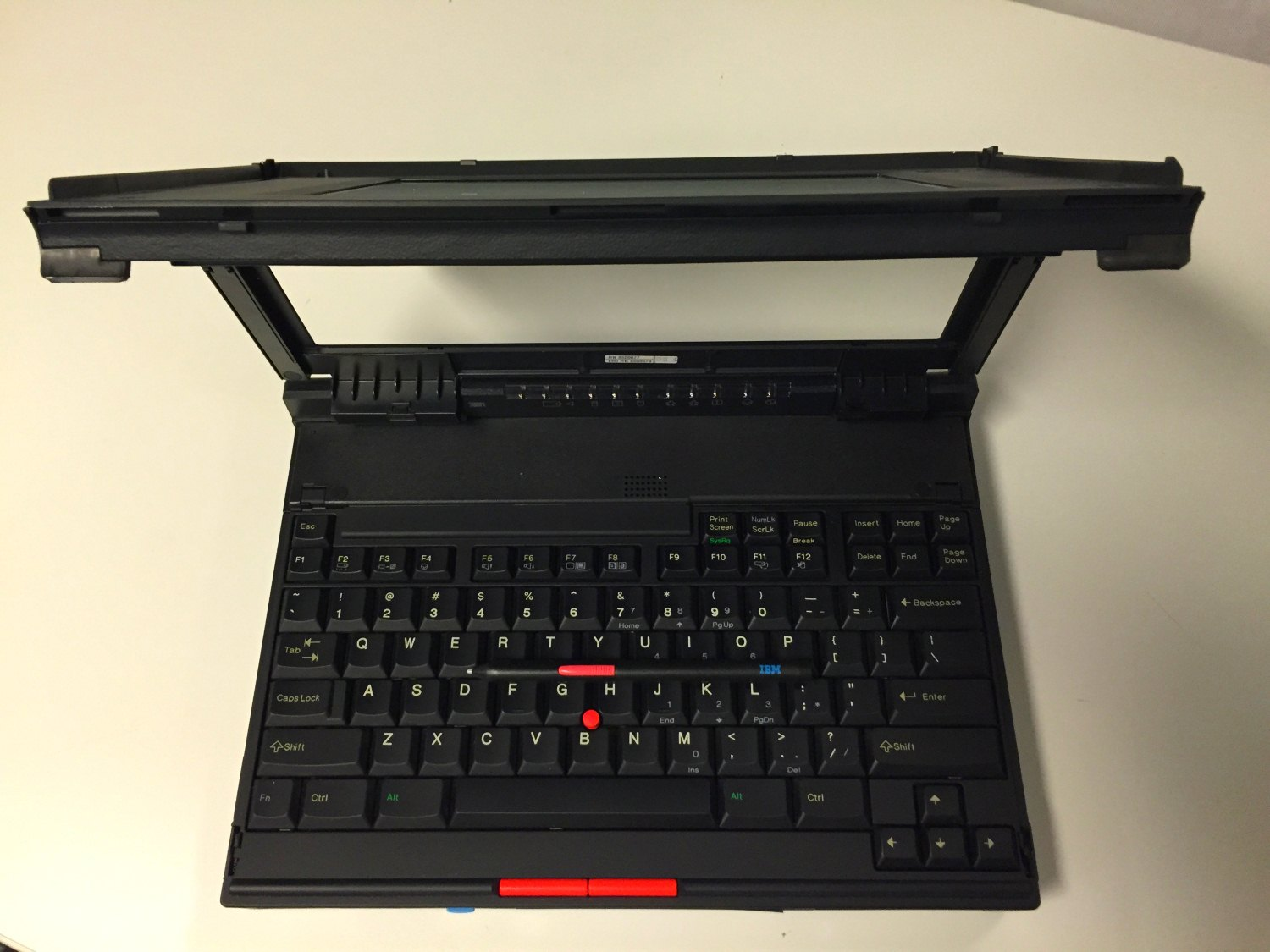
The 360PE in mid-fold showing how the monitor rotates over the unit

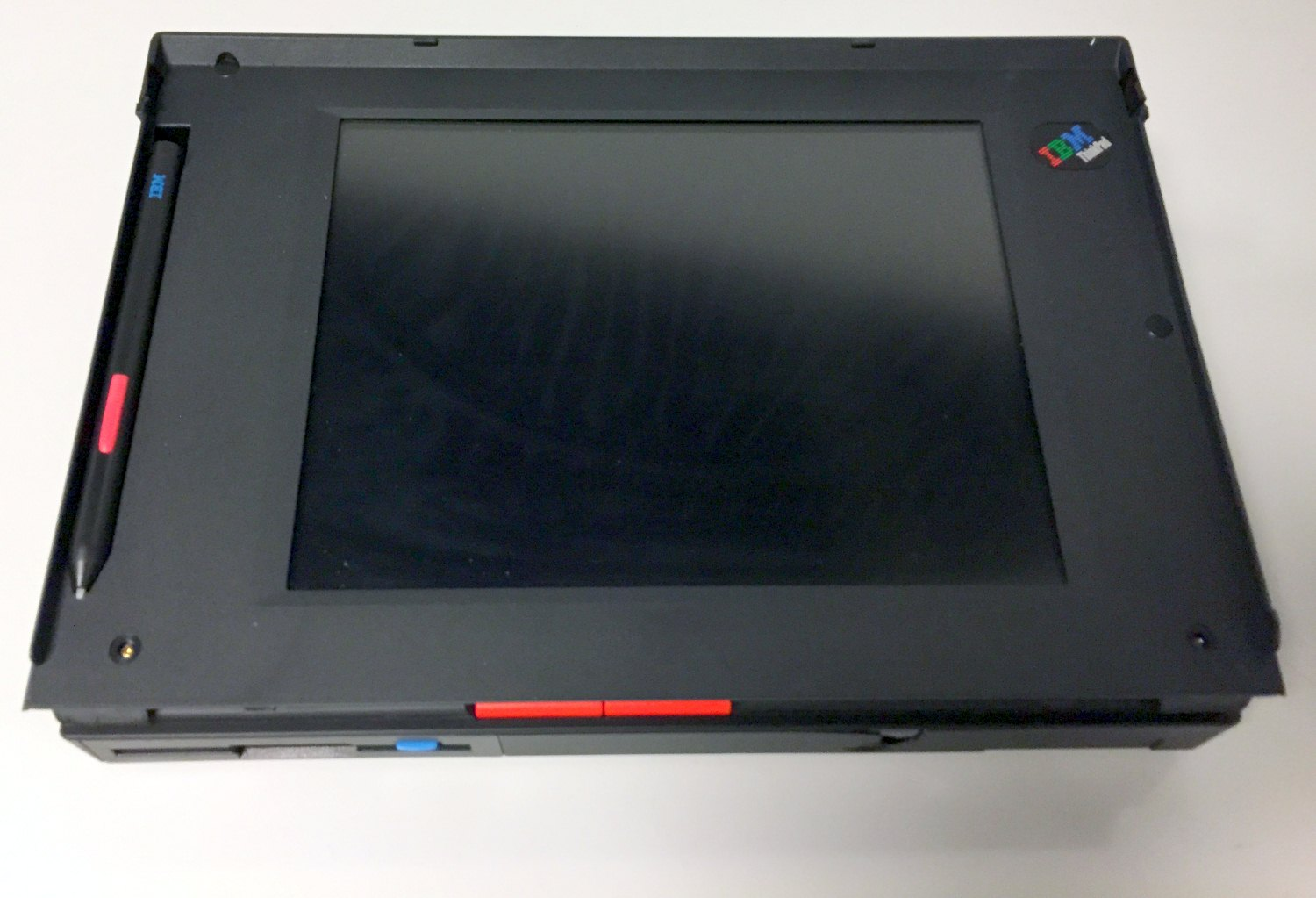
The 360PE folded in its 'tablet' mode allowing the laptop to be held as a tablet would

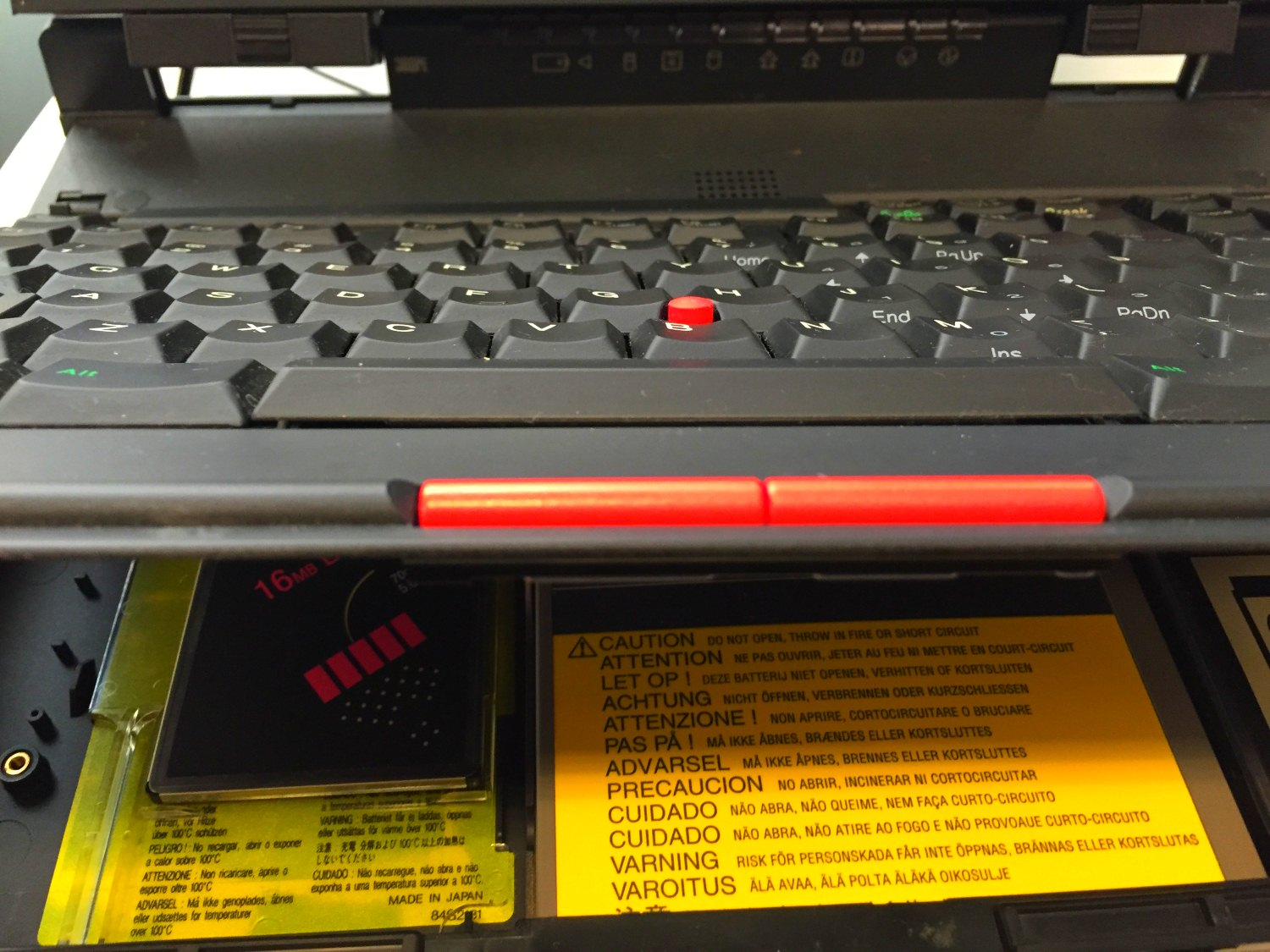
The 360PE's keyboard opens up on hinges for easy serviceability.

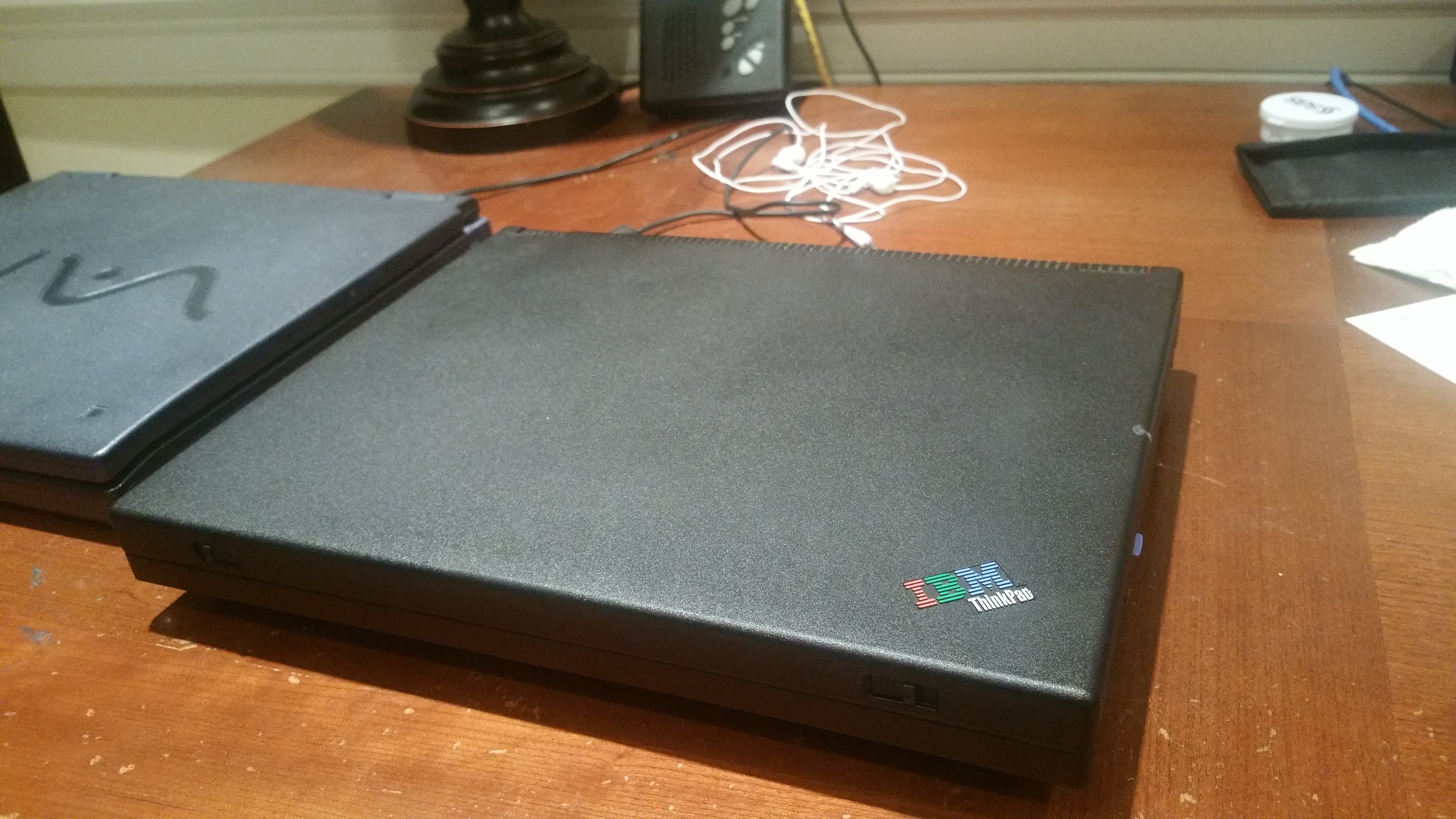
An IBM ThinkPad 390 with the lid closed

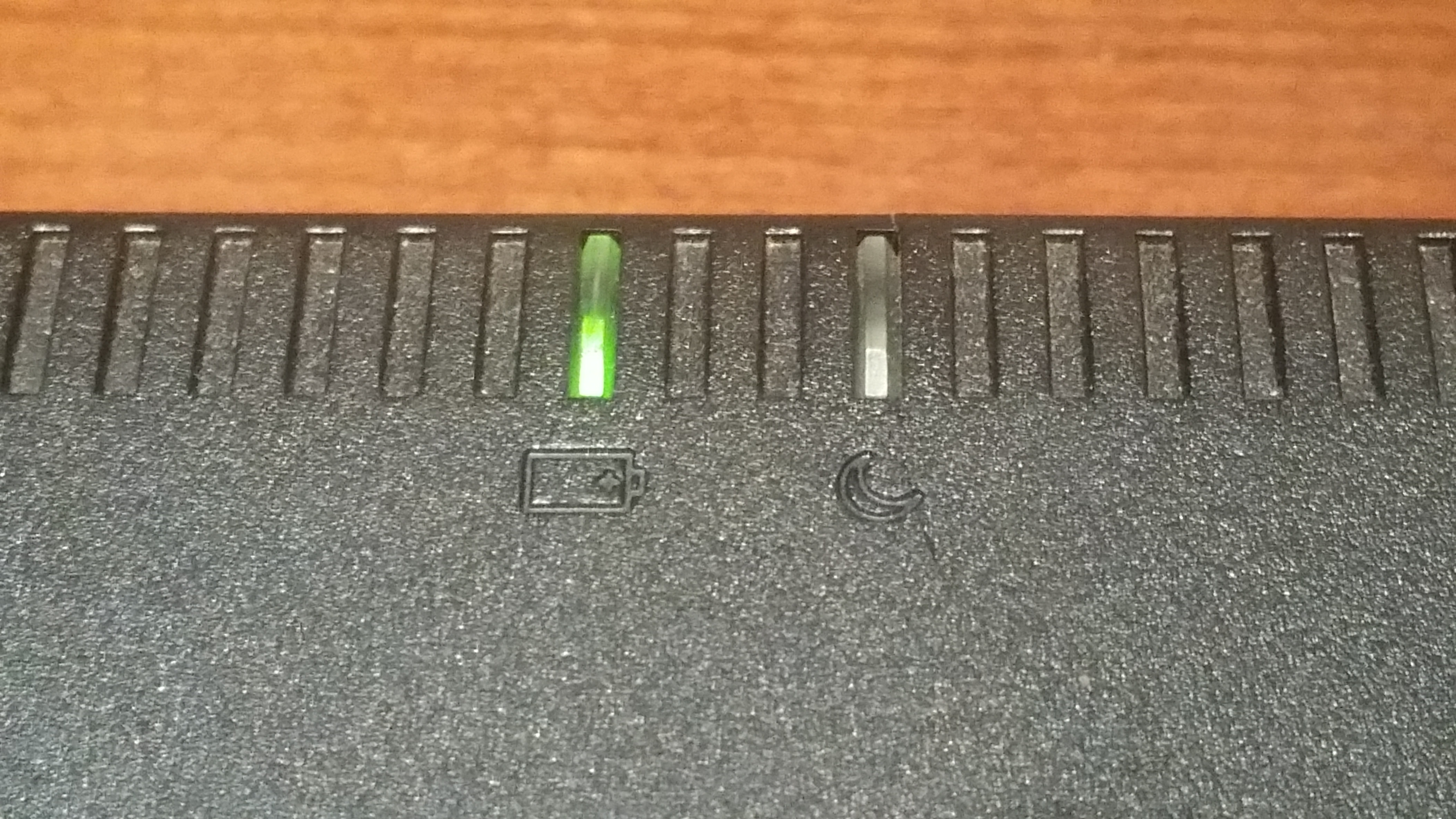
IBM ThinkPad 390 charging/standby indication lights

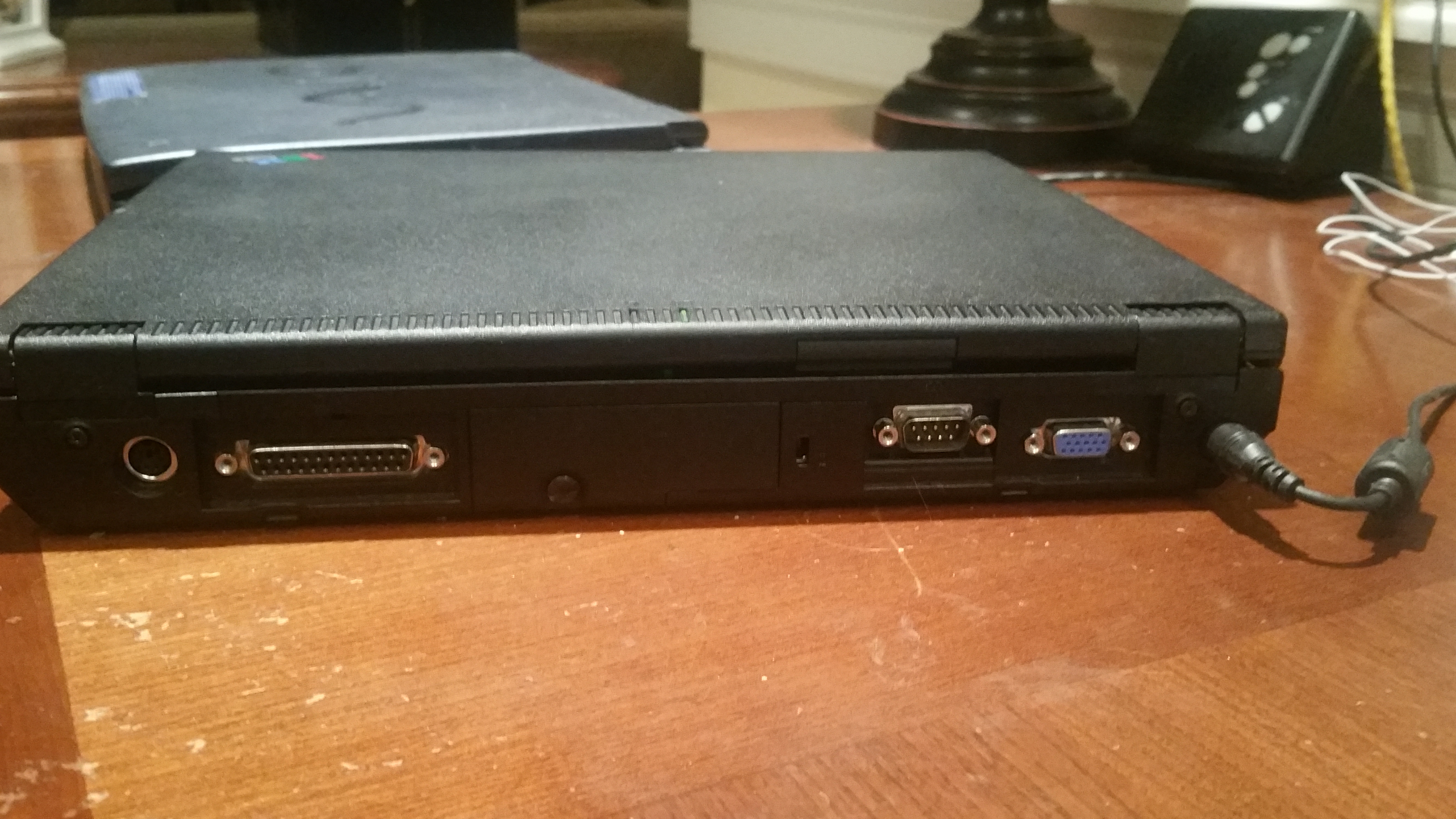
Back view of an IBM ThinkPad 390, showing the PS/2 mouse, DB25f printer, DE9m serial, DE15f, VGA and charger ports

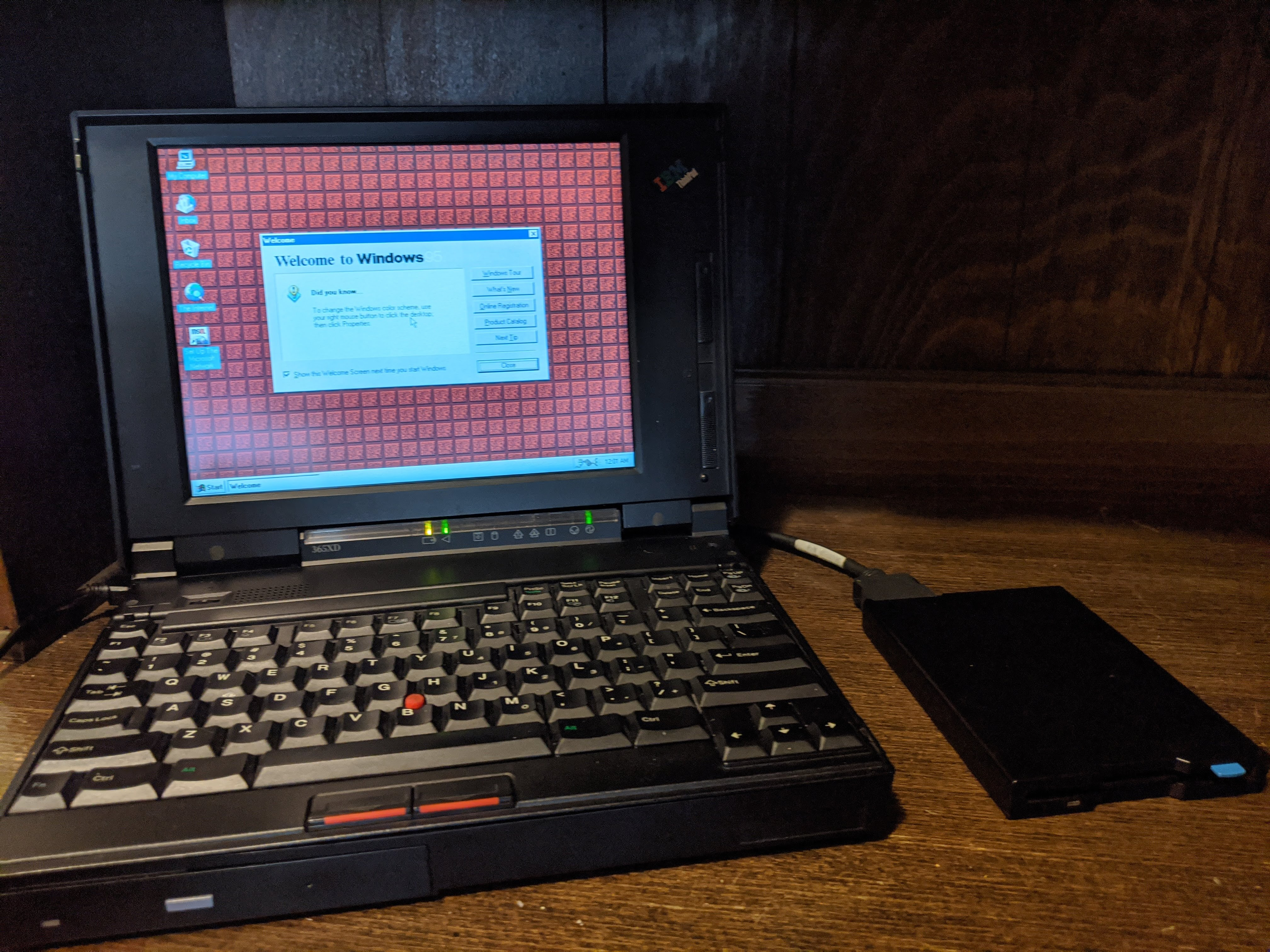
IBM ThinkPad 365XD w/External Floppy Drive running Windows 95

=== 500 series ===
The 500 series (500, 510, 560 (E, X, Z), 570 (E)) were the main line of the ultraportable ThinkPads. Starting with the 486SLC2-50 to the Pentium III 500, these machines had only a hard disk on board. Any other drives were external (or in the 570's case in the UltraBase). They weighed in at around 4 lb (1.8 kg).

The 500 series was succeeded by the X## series.

=== 600 series ===
The 600 series (600, 600E, and 600X) are thinner variants of the 770 series. The 600 series packed a 12.1 in (310 mm) SVGA or a 13.3 in (340 mm) XGA TFT LCD, Pentium MMX, Pentium II or III processor, full-sized keyboard, and optical bay into a package weighing roughly 5 lb (2.3 kg). IBM was able to create this light, fully featured machine by using lightweight but strong carbon fiber composite plastics. The battery shipped with some 600 series models had a manufacturing defect that left it vulnerable to memory effect and resulted in poor battery life, but this problem can be avoided by use of a third-party battery.

The 600 series was succeeded by the T## series.

=== 700 series ===
External image
- 730T

The 700 series was a high-end ThinkPad line; The released models (700T, 710T and 730T tablets; 700, 701, 720, 730, 750, 755, 760, 765, 770 laptops with various sub-models) can be configured with the best screens, largest hard drives and fastest processors available in the ThinkPad range; some features can be found only on a 700 series models, and was the first successful ThinkPad introduced in 1992 (that was a tablet PC 700T model without a keyboard and a mouse).

The 700 series was succeeded by the T## and A##p series.

=== 800 series ===
The ThinkPad 800 series (800/820/821/822/823/850/851/860) were unique as they were based on the PowerPC architecture rather than the Intel x86 architecture. Most of the 800 Series laptops used the PowerPC 603e CPU, at speeds of 100 MHz, or 166 MHz in the 860 model. The PowerPC ThinkPad line was considerably more expensive than the standard x86 ThinkPads — even a modestly configured 850 cost upwards of $12,000. All of the PowerPC ThinkPads could run Windows NT 3.51 and 4.0, AIX 4.1.x, and Solaris Desktop 2.5.1 PowerPC Edition.

=== WorkPad ===
Based on ThinkPad design although branded WorkPad, the IBM WorkPad z50 was a Handheld PC running Windows CE, released in 1999. The WorkPad brand of products, outside of the z50 model, was a line of personal digital assistants(PDAs).

=== i series (1998–2002) ===
IBM ThinkPad i and S series 1998–2001
Screen	1998	1999					2000							2001	
15.0"								i1492	i1592						
14.1"						i1560		i1483							
14.1"			i1472	i1721		i1480		i1482							
14.1"			i1452	i1552	i1400	i1460			i1562					i1800	
13.3"										i1157					
13.3"	i1450	i1451		i1720						i1260	i1370	i1200	i1300		
13.0"					i1400	i1420	i1421	i1422		i1230					
12.1"	i1410	i1411	i1412	i1512	i1400	i1540	i1541	i1442	i1542	i1210	i1330	i1200	i1300		
12.1"							i1620			i1250					
12.0"							i1441								
10.4"												i1124		S30	S31

The ThinkPad i Series was introduced by IBM in 1998 and was geared towards a multimedia focus with many models featuring independent integrated CD players and multimedia access buttons. The 1400 and 1500 models were designed by Acer for IBM under contract (and are thus nicknamed the AcerPad) and featured similar hardware found in Acer laptops (including ALi chipsets, three way audio jacks and the internal plastics painted with a copper paint). Some of the i Series ThinkPads, particularly the Acer developed models, are prone to broken hinges and stress damage on the chassis.

One notable ThinkPad in the i Series lineup are the S3x (S30/S31) models: featuring a unique keyboard and lid design allowing a standard size keyboard to fit in a chassis that otherwise wouldn't be able to support the protruding keyboard. These models were largely only available in Asia Pacific. IBM offered an optional piano black lid on these models (designed by the Yamato Design lab). This is the only ThinkPad since the 701C to feature a special design to accommodate a keyboard that's physically larger than the laptop and also the only ThinkPad (aside from the Z61) to deviate away from the standard matte lid.

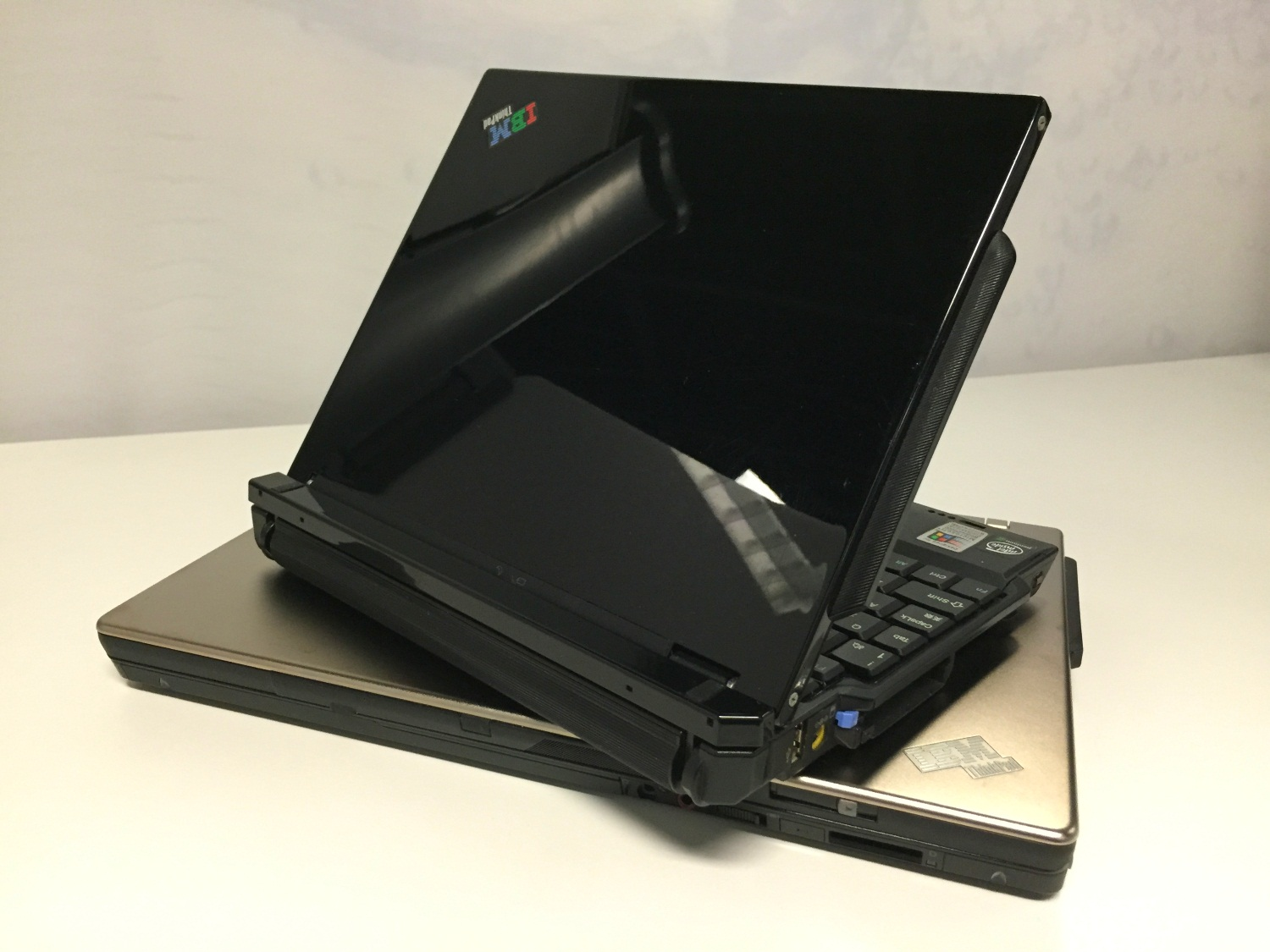
The ThinkPad S31 with the piano black finish option sitting on top of a Z61t; both ThinkPads deviate from the usual matte black.

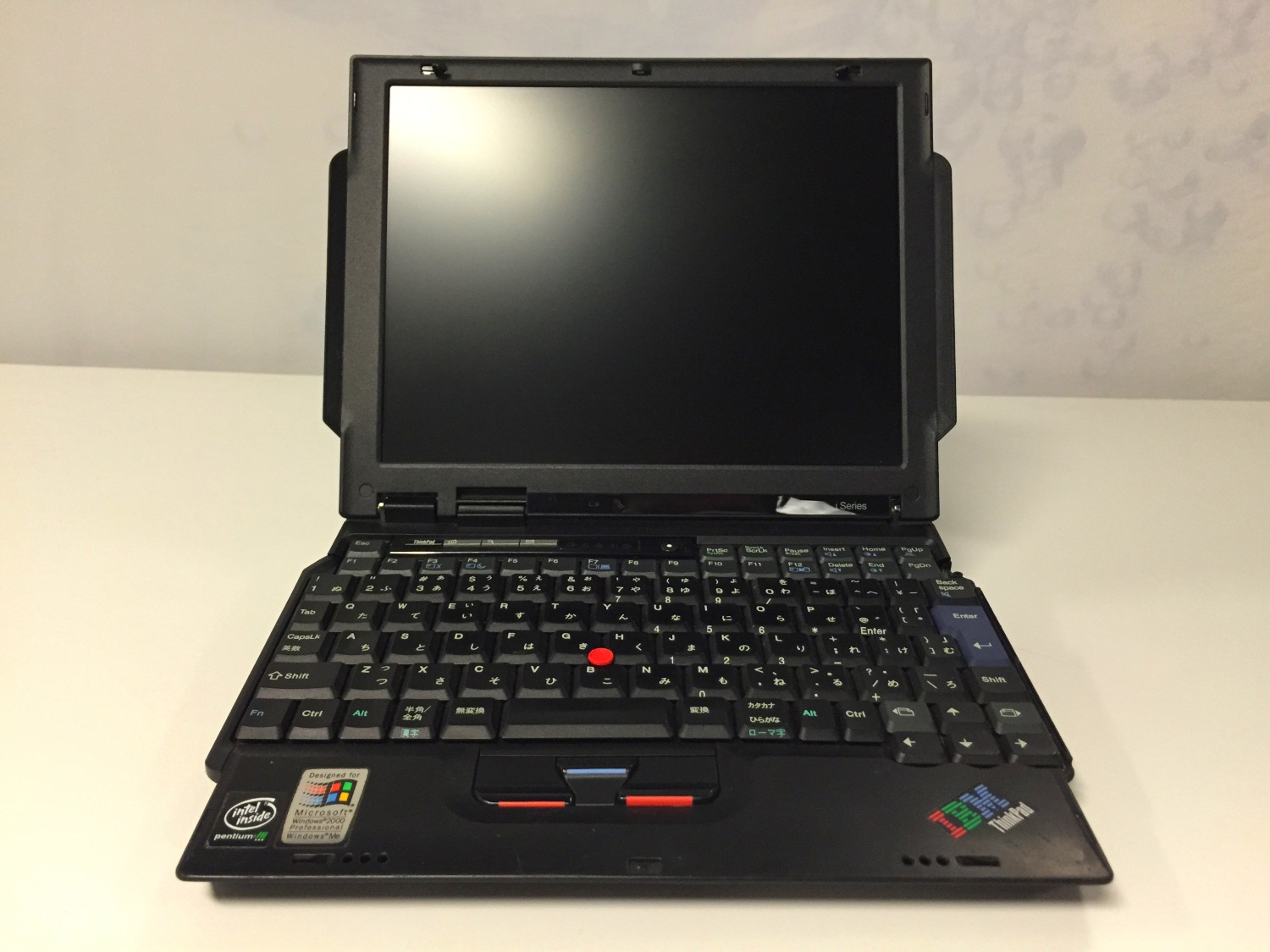
The S31 with the lid open showing the unique protruding keyboard; no touchpad was offered, to keep the laptop compact.

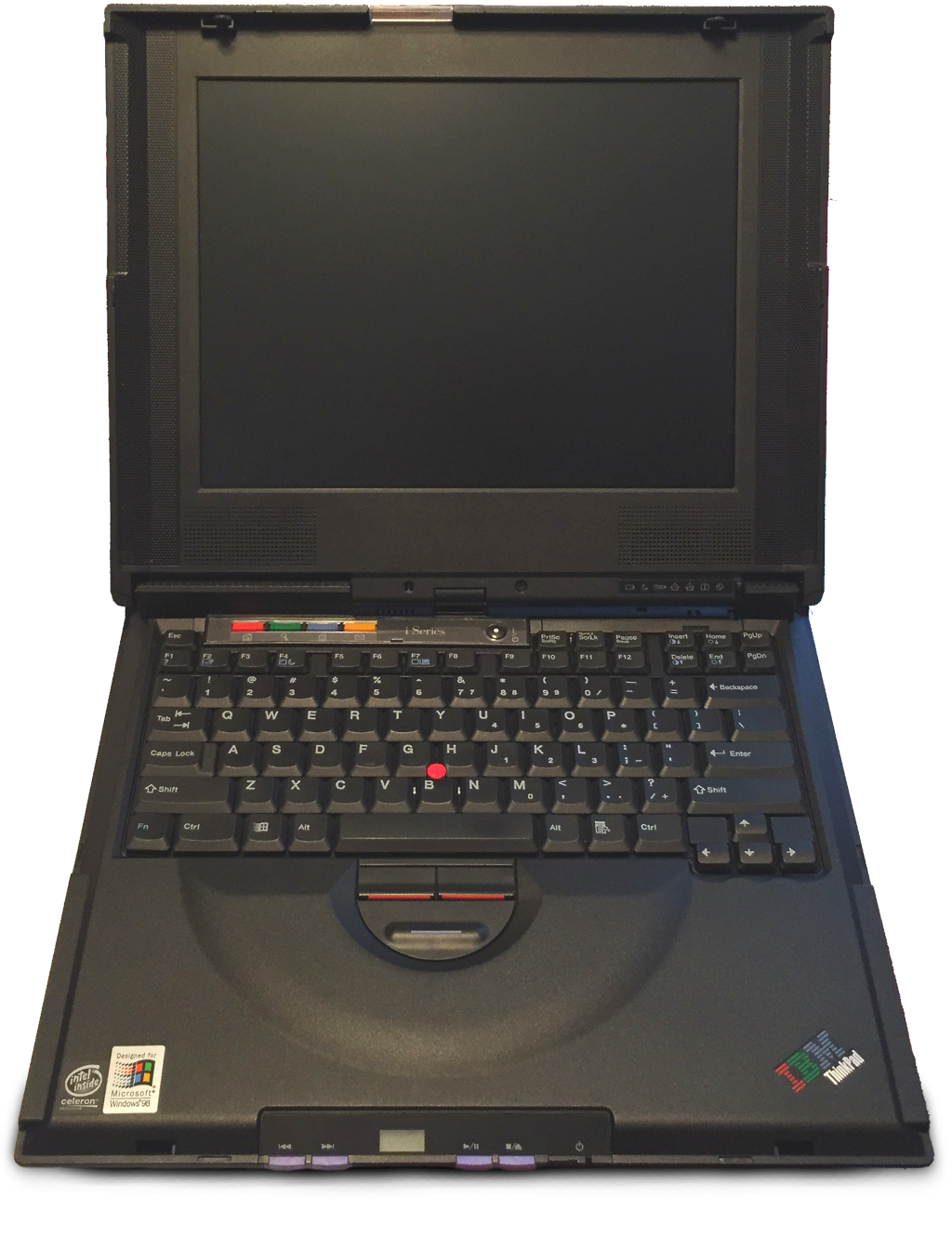
The i Series 1400 with the integrated CD player and customizable multimedia access buttons

=== A series (2000–2004) ===
IBM ThinkPad A series 2000–2004
Case	Screen	Type	A2x			A3x	
14"	12.1"	Low Cost	A20m	A21e		Replaced by ThinkPad R series	
14"	12.1"	Low Cost	A20m	A21m	A22m	Replaced by ThinkPad R series	
14"	13.3"	Low Cost		A21e	A22e	Replaced by ThinkPad R series	
14"	14.1"	Low Cost		A21e	A22e	Replaced by ThinkPad R series	
14"	14.1"	Mainstream	A20m	A21m	A22m	Replaced by ThinkPad R series	
15"	14.1"	Low Cost				A30	A31
15"	15"	Low Cost	A20m	A21e			
15"	15"	Mainstream	A20m	A21m	A22m	A30	A31
15"	15"	Performance	A20p	A21p	A22p	A30p	A31p

The A series was developed as an all-around productivity machine, equipped with hardware powerful enough to make it a desktop replacement. Hence it was the biggest and heaviest ThinkPad series of its time, but also had features not even found in a T series of the same age. The A series was dropped in favor of the R and G series.

The A31 was released in 2002 as a desktop replacement system equipped with: A Pentium 4-M processor clocked at 1.6, 1.8, 1.9, or 2.0 GHz (max supported is a 2.6 GHz), An ATI Mobility Radeon 7500, 128 or 256 MB of PC2100 RAM (officially upgradable to 1 GB but can be unofficially upgraded to 2 GB), IBM High Rate Wireless (PRISM 2.5 Based, can be modified to support WPA-TKIP) and equipped with a 20, 30, or 40 GB hard disk drive.

=== R series (2001–2010, 2018–present) ===
The R series was a budget line, beginning with the R30 in 2001 and ending with the R400 and R500 presented in 2008.

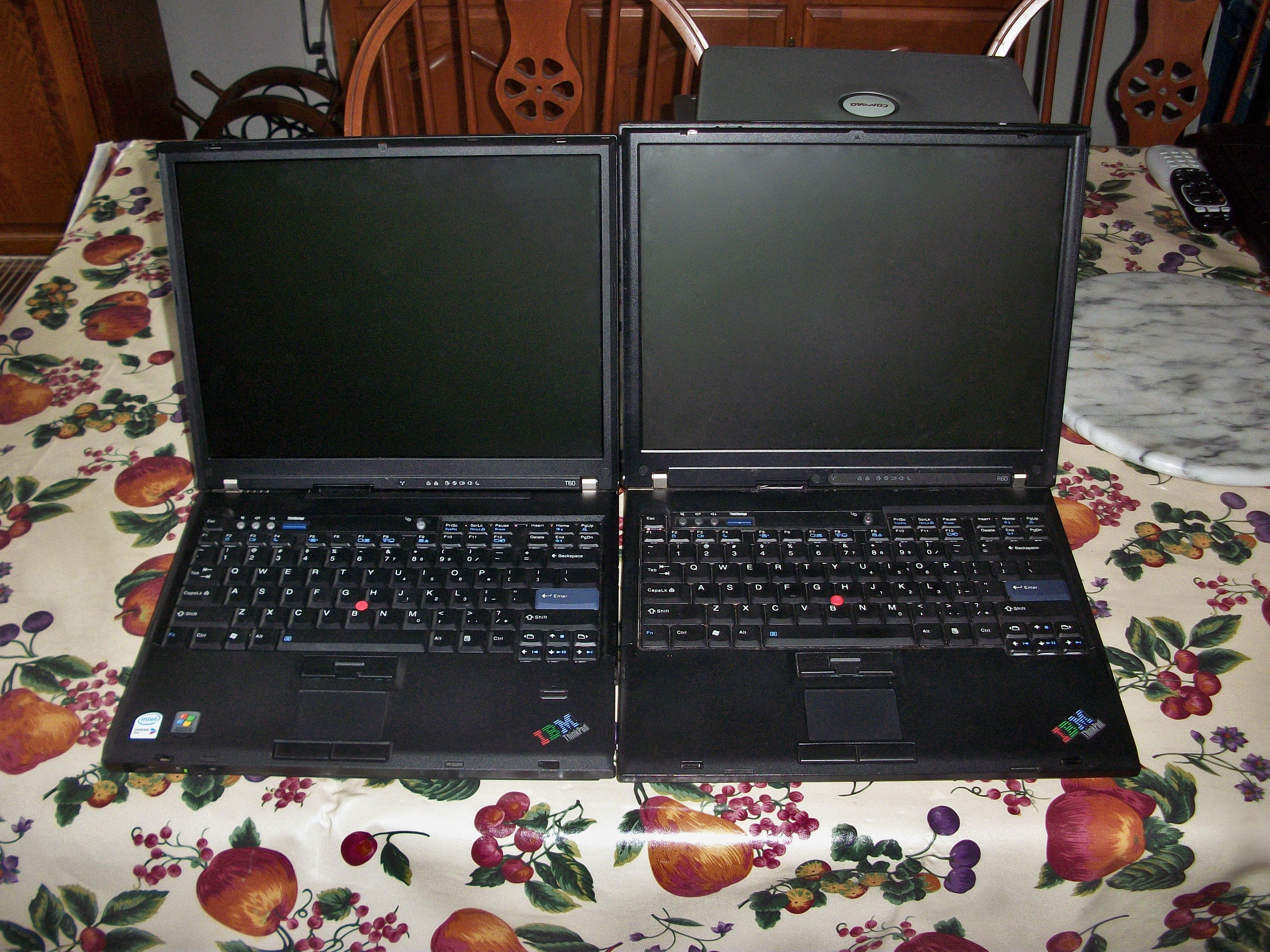
An IBM ThinkPad R60 from 2006 (right) next to a T60 also from 2006

The successors also from 2006 of the R400 and R500 models are the L series models L412 and L512.

A notable model is the R50p with an optional 15" 2048 × 1536 IPS LCD screen (introduced in 2003).

IBM/Lenovo ThinkPad R series 2001–2010
			R3*			R4*	R5*			R6*		R*0*
Case	Screen	Marketing	4:3 screens									
14.1"	13.3"	Low-cost				R40e	merged with 14" line					
14.1"	13.3"	Standard	R30	R31	R32	R40	merged with 14" line					
14.1"	14.1"	Low-cost				R40e	R50e	R51e	R52e	R60e	replaced by 16:10 line	
14.1"	14.1"	Low-cost								R60i	replaced by 16:10 line	
14.1"	14.1"	Standard	R30	R31	R32	R40	R50	R51	R52	R60	replaced by 16:10 line	
15.0"		Low-cost					R50e	R51e	R52e	R60e	replaced by 16:10 line	
15.0"		Low-cost								R60i	R61i	replaced by SL series
15.0"		Standard				R40	R50	R51	R52	R60	R61	replaced by R500
15.0"		Performance					R50p	replaced by T##p series				
			16:10 screens									
14.1"		Low-cost									R61e	replaced by SL series
14.1"		Low-cost									R61i	replaced by SL series
14.1"		Ultrabook									R61u	
14.1"		Standard									R61	R400
15.4"		Low-cost									R61e	replaced by SL series
15.4"		Low-cost									R61i	replaced by SL series
15.4"		Ultrabook									R61u	
15.4"		Standard									R61	R500

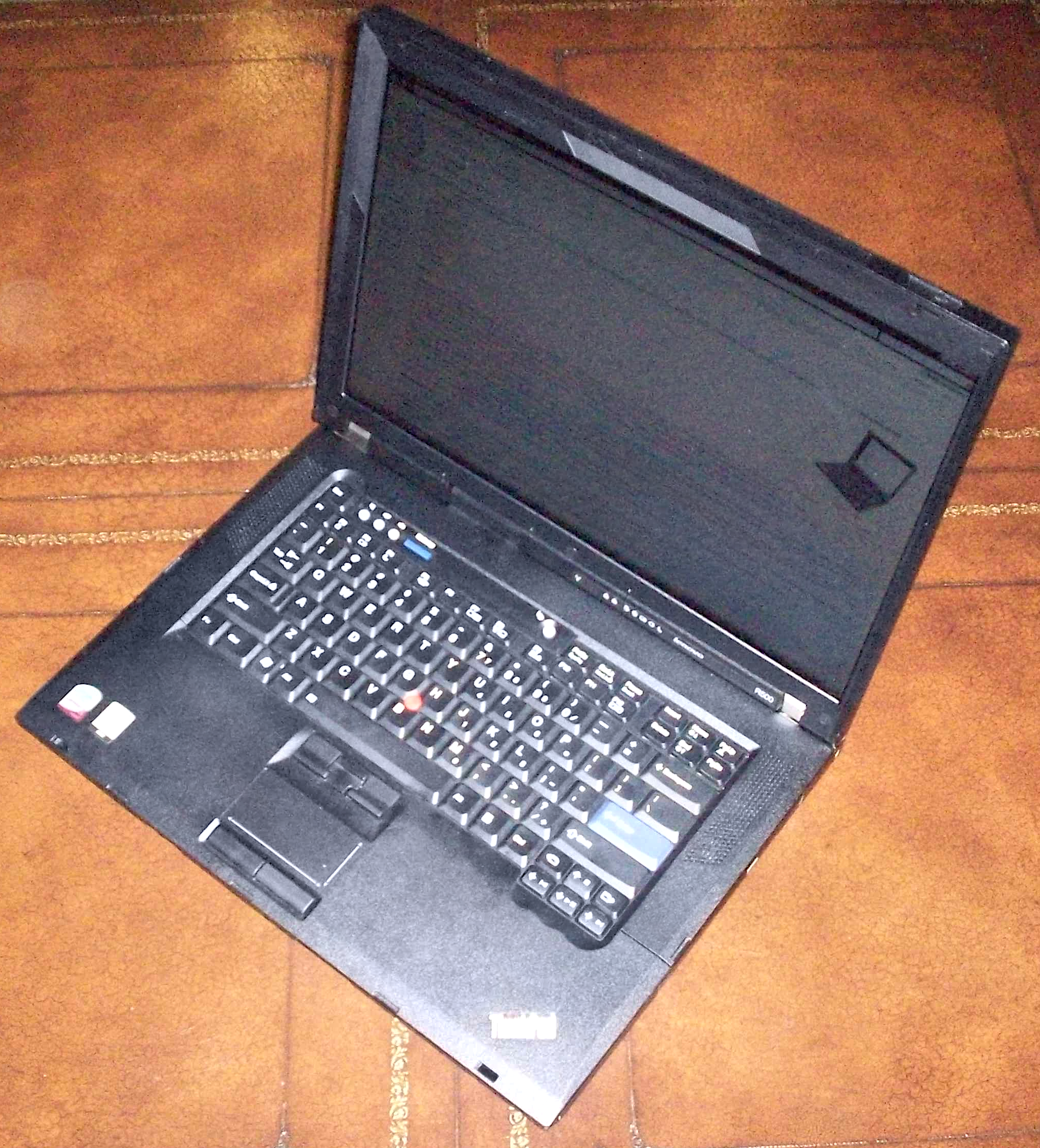
Lenovo ThinkPad R500

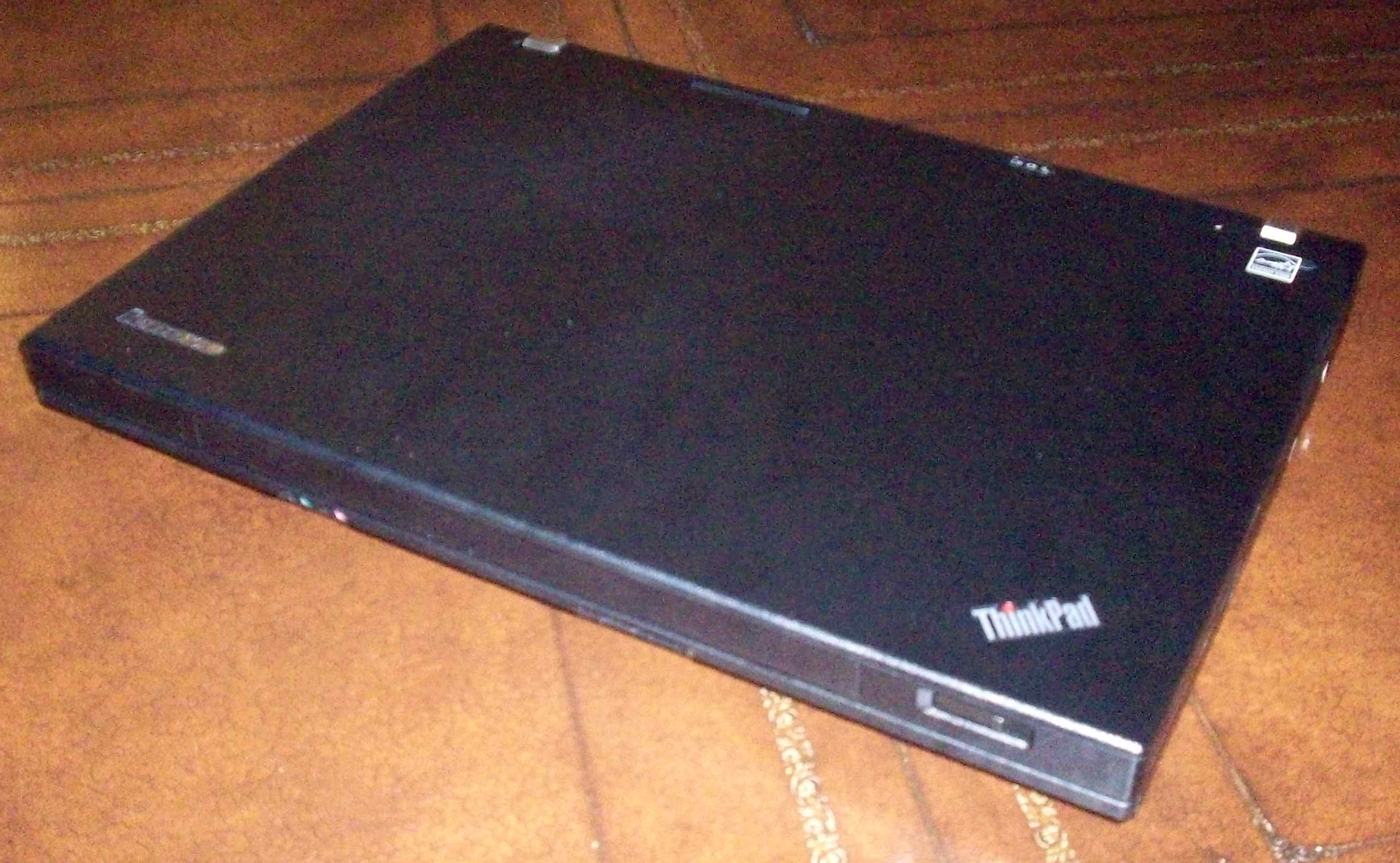
Lenovo ThinkPad R500 (lid closed)

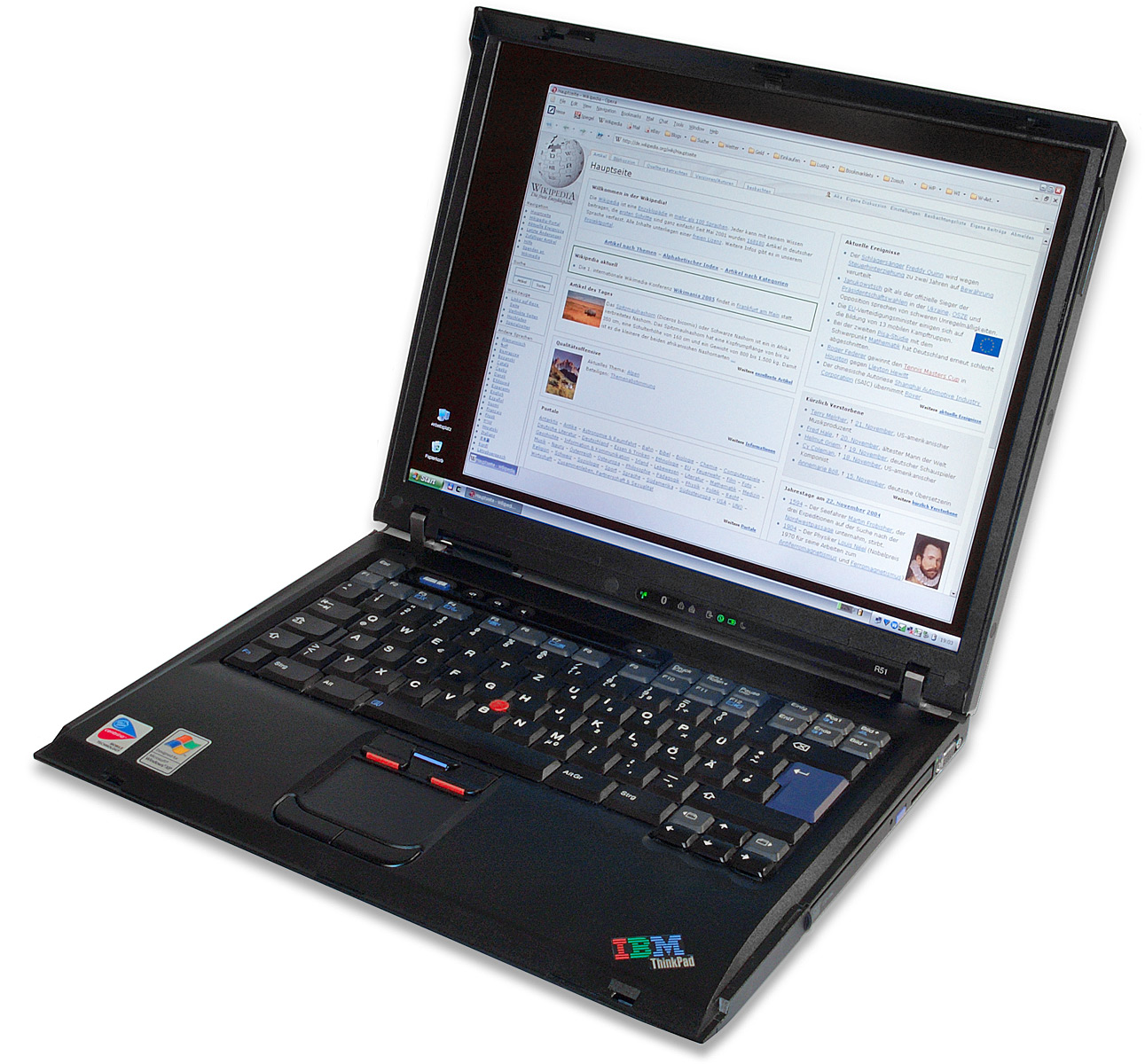
IBM ThinkPad R51

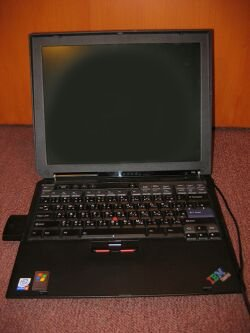
IBM ThinkPad R32

The R series reintroduced in 2018 (for Chinese market only) with the same hardware as E series models, but with aluminum display cover, discrete GPU, TPM chip and fingerprint reader.

=== G series (2003–2006) ===
The G series consisted of only three models, the G40, G41 and G50 (which was only sold in Japan) manufactured by Acer for IBM. Being large and heavy machines, equipped with powerful desktop processors, this line of ThinkPads consequently served mainly as budget replacements for desktop computers.

The G series was able to be configured with either an entry-level Celeron or a 3 GHz Pentium 4 processor. The G series line of ThinkPads often received criticism for its heft, weighing in at 8.4lbs (3.81kg).

=== Z series (2005–2007) ===
The Z series was released as a high-end multimedia laptop; as a result this was the first ThinkPad to feature a widescreen (16:10 aspect ratio) display. The Z series was also unique in that certain models featured an (optional) titanium lid. Integrated WWAN and a webcam were also found on some configurations. The series has only ever included the Z60 (Z60m and Z60t) and Z61 (Z61m, Z61t and Z61p); the latter of which is the first Z series ThinkPad with Intel "Yonah" Dual-Core Technology. The processor supports Intel VT-x; this is disabled in the BIOS but can be turned on with a BIOS update. Running fully virtualized operating systems via Xen or VMware is therefore possible. Despite the Z61 carrying the same number as the T61, the hardware of the Z61 is closer to a T60 (and likewise the Z60 being closer to a T43).

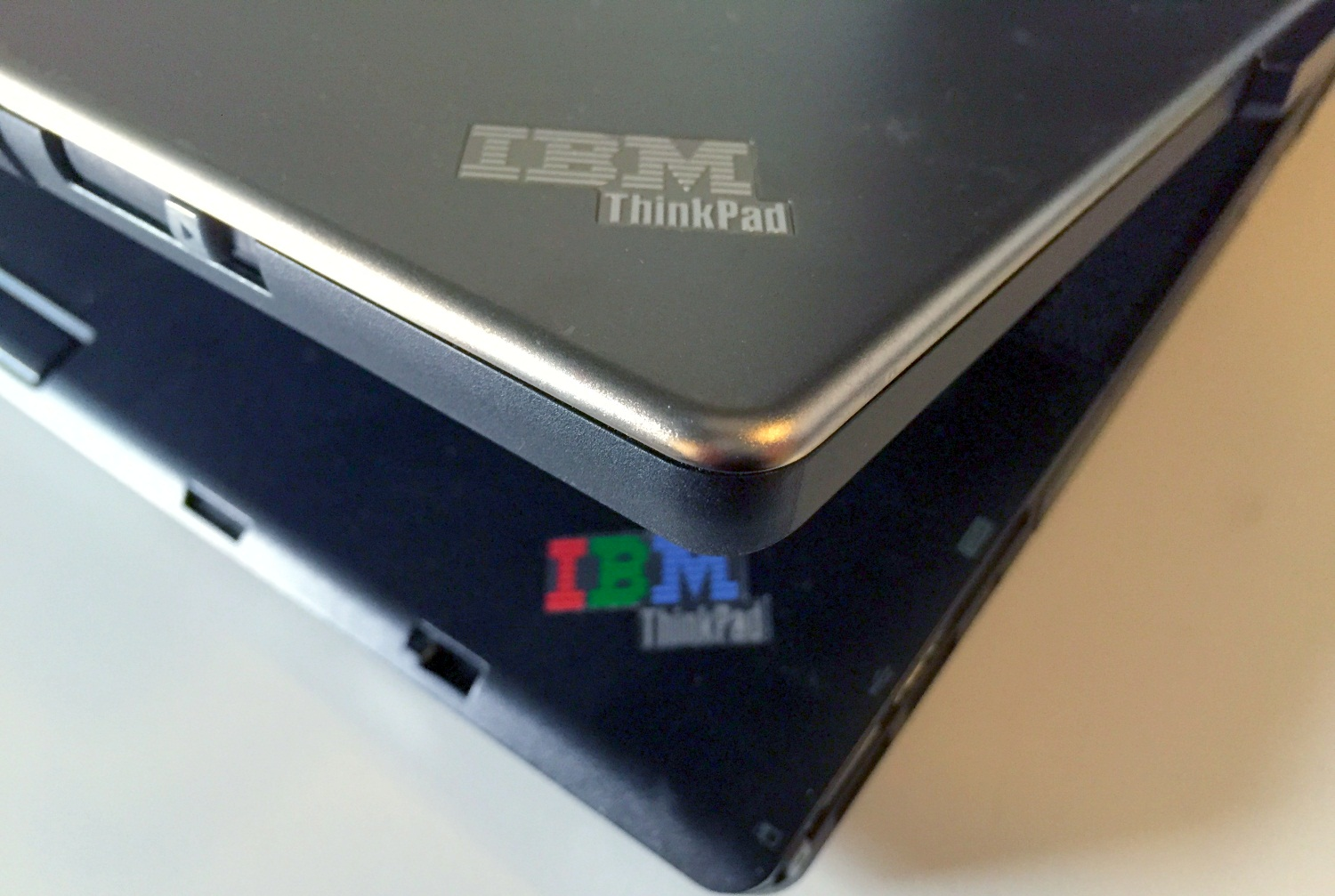
The Z61 featuring a titanium lid (note the duality of colors)

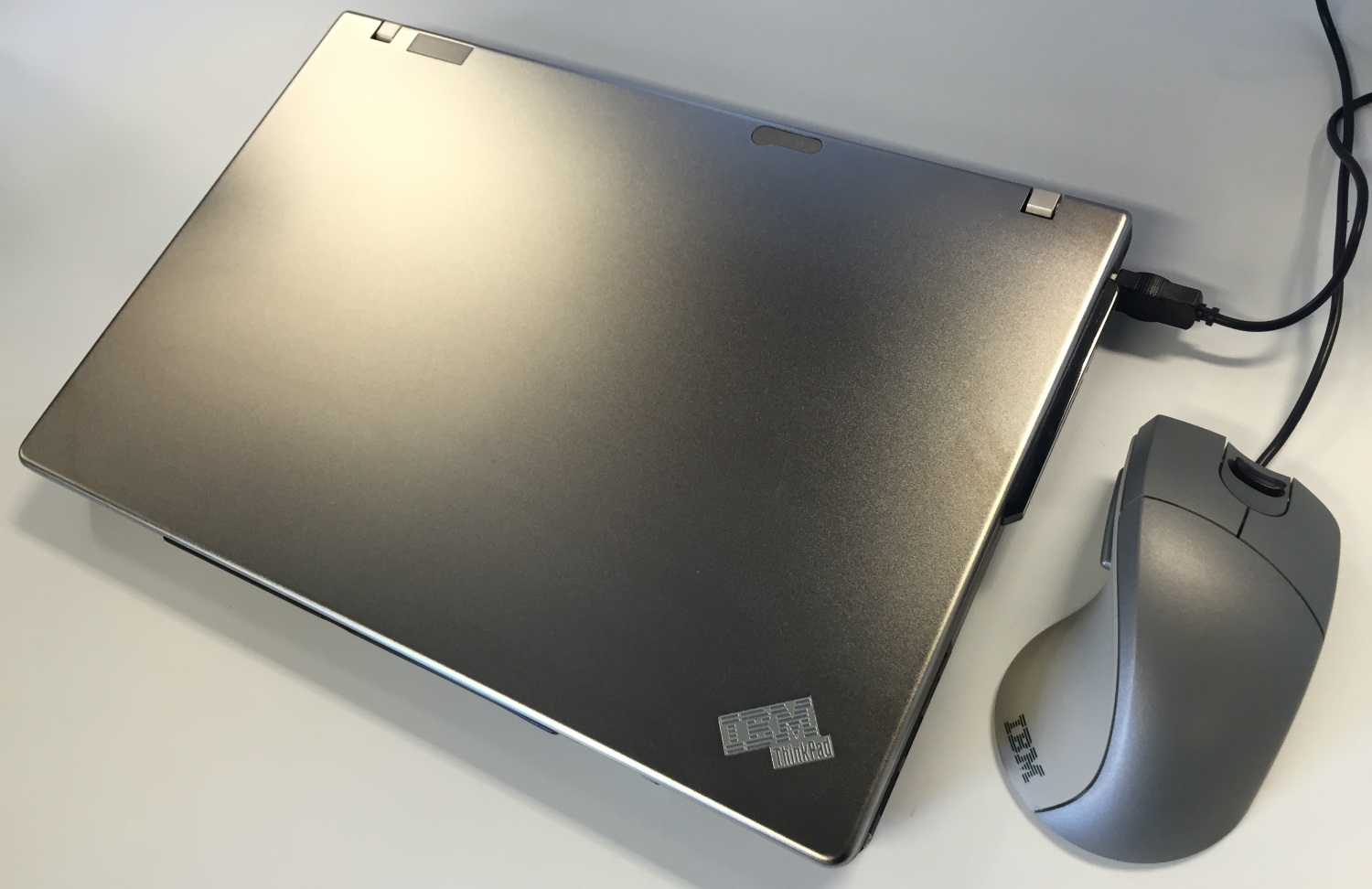
The ThinkPad Z61t accompanied by a silver ScrollPoint Pro

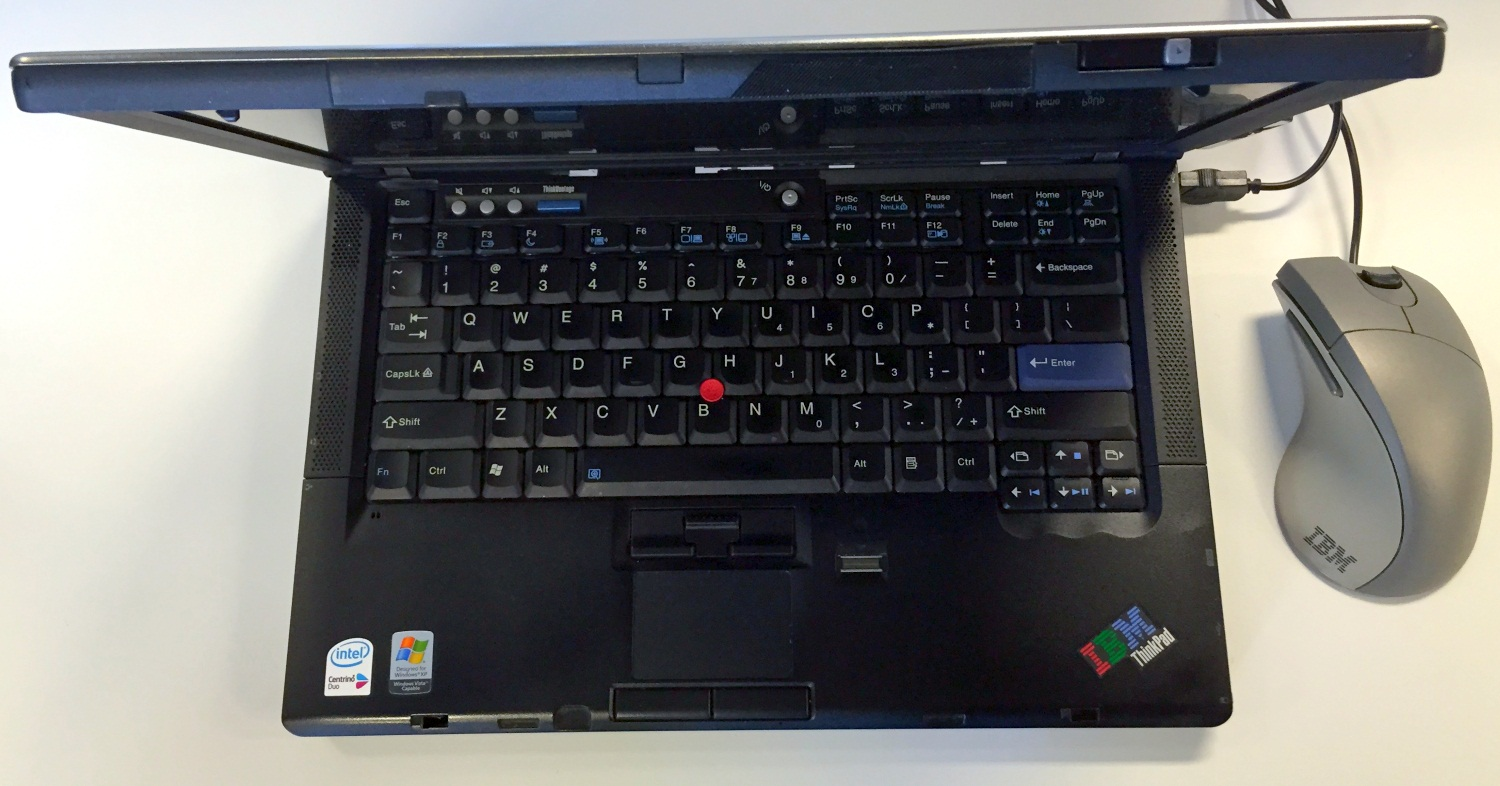
The ThinkPad Z61t opened showing the internal keyboard

=== ThinkPad Reserve Edition (2007) ===
The "15-year anniversary" ThinkPad model (based on a X60s laptop). This model was initially known inside of Lenovo as the "Scout". This was the name of the horse ridden by Tonto, the sidekick from the 1950s television series The Lone Ranger. Lenovo envisioned the Scout as a very high-end ThinkPad that would be analogous to a luxury car. Each unit was covered in fine leather embossed with its owners initials. Extensive market research was conducted on how consumers would perceive this form factor. It was determined that they appreciated that it emphasized warmth, nature, and human relations over technology. The Scout was soon renamed the ThinkPad Reserve Edition. It came bundled with premium services including a dedicated 24-hour technical support hotline that would be answered immediately. It was released in 2007 and sold for $5,000 in the United States.

=== SL series (2008–2010) ===
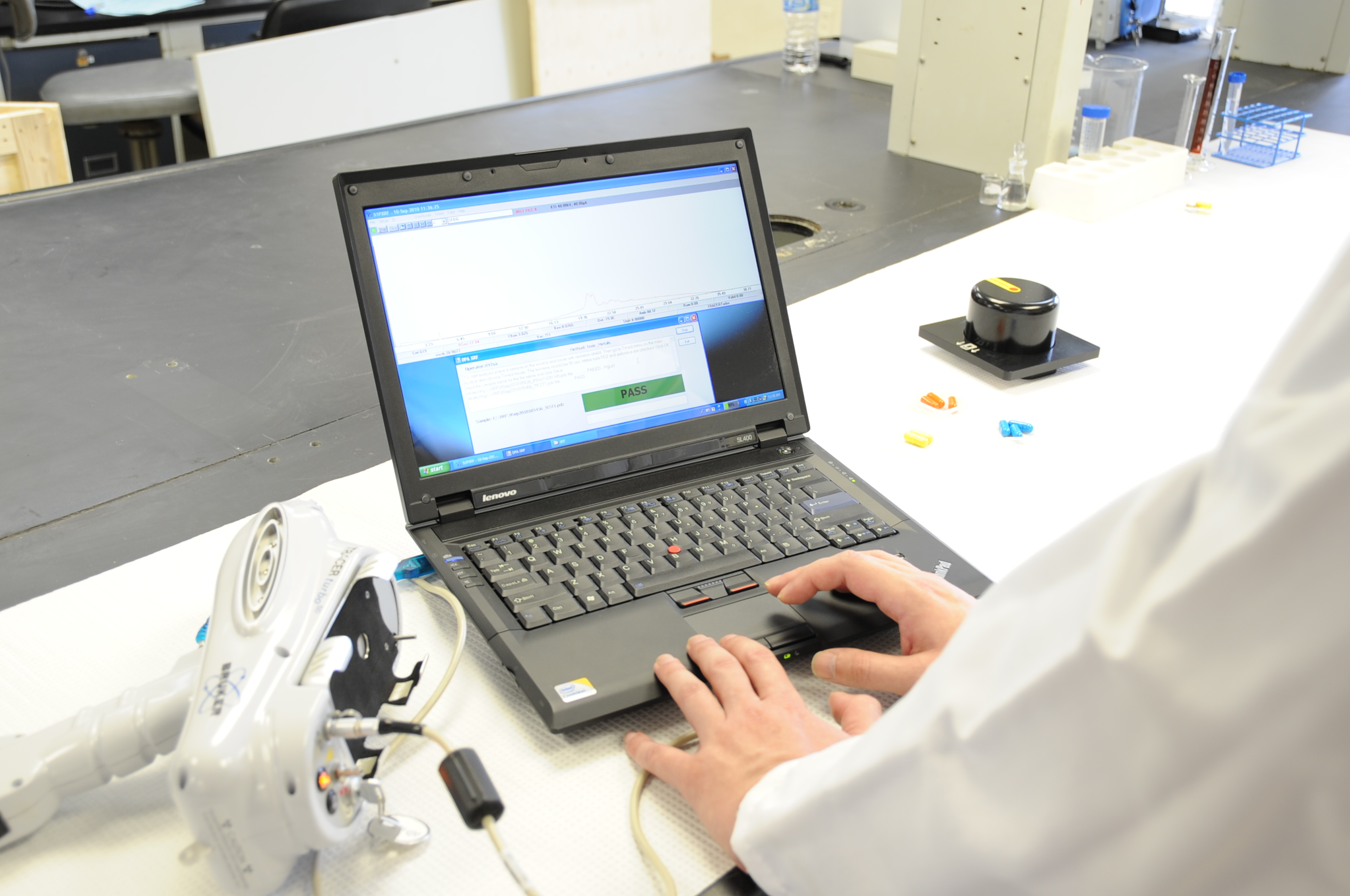
ThinkPad SL400

The SL series was launched in 2008 as a low-end ThinkPad targeted mainly geared toward small businesses. These lacked several traditional ThinkPad features, such as the ThinkLight, magnesium alloy roll cage, UltraBay, and lid latch, and use a 6-row keyboard with a different layout than the traditional 7-row ThinkPad keyboard; also, SL series models have IdeaPad-based firmware. Models offered included 13.3" (SL300), 14" (SL400 and SL410) and 15.6" (SL500 and SL510).

=== W series (2008–2015) ===
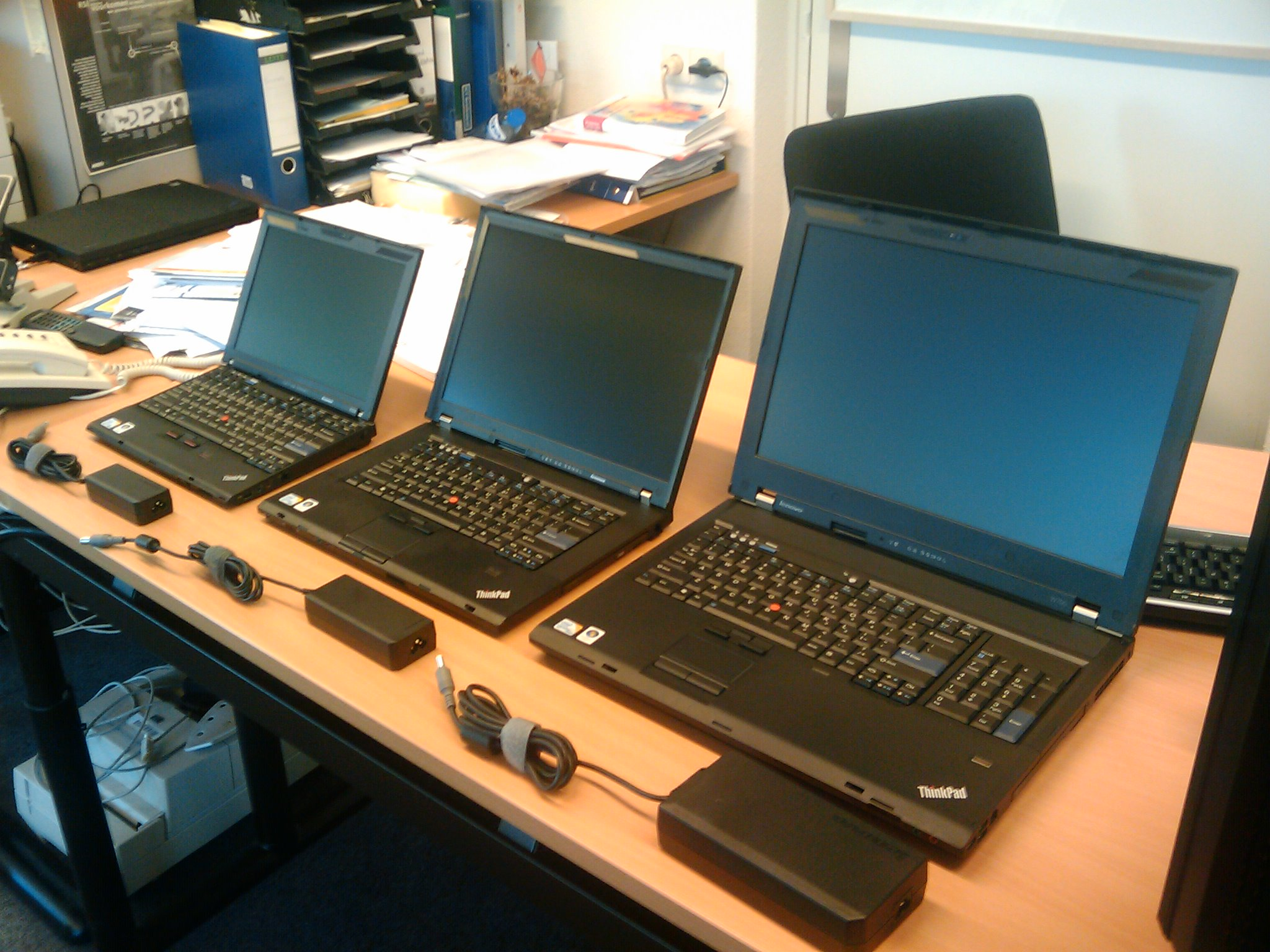
17.3" W700 compared to a 15.6" T500 and a compact 12.5" X200

The W series laptops were introduced by Lenovo as workstation-class laptops with their own letter designation, a descendant of prior ThinkPad T series models suffixed with 'p' (e.g. T61p), and are geared towards CAD users, photographers, power users, and others, who need a high-performance system for demanding tasks. The W series laptops were launched in 2008, at the same time as the Intel Centrino 2, marking an overhaul of Lenovo's product lineup. The first two W series laptops introduced were the W500 and the W700.

Previously available were the W7xx series (17" widescreen model), the W500 (15.4" 16:10 ratio model), the W510 (15.6" 16:9 ratio model), and W520 (15.6" 16:9 ratio model). The W700ds and the W701ds both had two displays: a 17" main LCD and a 10" slide-out secondary LCD. The W7xx series were also available with a Wacom digitizer built into the palm rest. These high-performance workstation models offered more high-end components, such as quad core CPUs and higher-end workstation graphics compared to the T series, and were the most powerful ThinkPad laptops available. Until the W540, they retained the ThinkLight, UltraBay, roll cage, and lid latch found on the T series. The W540 release marked the end of the lid latch, ThinkLight, and hot-swappable UltraBays found in earlier models.

The ThinkPad W series laptops from Lenovo are described by the manufacturer as being "mobile workstations", and suit that description by being physically on the larger side of the laptop spectrum, with screens ranging from 15" to 17" in size. Most W series laptops offer high-end quad-core Intel processors with an integrated GPU as well as an Nvidia Quadro discrete GPU, utilizing Nvidia Optimus to switch between the two GPUs as required. Notable exceptions are the W500, which has ATI FireGL integrated workstation-class graphics, and the W550s, which is an Ultrabook-specification laptop with only a dual-core processor. The W series laptops offer independent software vendor certifications from various vendors such as Adobe Systems and Autodesk for CAD and 3D modeling software.

The ThinkPad W series has been discontinued and replaced by the P series mobile workstations.

=== Edge series (2010) ===
The Edge series was released early in 2010 as small business and consumer-end machines. The design was a radical departure compared to the traditional black boxy ThinkPad design, with glossy surfaces (optional matte finish on later models), rounded corners, and silver trim. They were also offered in red, a first for the traditionally black ThinkPads. Like the SL, this series was targeted towards small businesses and consumers, and lack the roll cage, UltraBay, lid latch, and ThinkLight of traditional ThinkPads (though the 2011 E220s and E420s had ThinkLights). This also introduced an island-style keyboard with a significantly different layout.

Models included 13.3" (Edge 13), 14" (Edge 14), and 15.6" (Edge 15) sizes. An 11.6" (Edge 11) model was offered, but not available in the United States. The latest models of E series can be offered with Edge branding, but this naming is optional and uncommon.

=== S series (2012–2014) ===
The S Series is positioned as a mid-range ThinkPad offering, containing ultrabooks derived from the Edge Series. As of August 2013, the S Series includes S531 and S440 models; their cases are made of aluminum and magnesium alloy, available in silver and gunmetal colors.

==== ThinkPad Twist (2012) ====
The ThinkPad Twist (Edge S230u) is a laptop/tablet computer hybrid aimed at high-end users. The Twist gets its name from its screen's ability to twist in a manner that converts the device into a tablet. The Twist has a 12.5" screen and makes use of Intel's Core i7 processor and SSD technology in lieu of a hard drive.

In a review for Engadget Dana Wollman wrote, "Lately, we feel like all of our reviews of Windows 8 convertibles end the same way. The ThinkPad Twist has plenty going for it: a bright IPS display, a good port selection, an affordable price and an unrivaled typing experience. Like ThinkPads past, it also offers some useful software features for businesses lacking dedicated IT departments. All good things, but what's a road warrior to do when the battery barely lasts four hours? Something tells us the Twist will still appeal to Lenovo loyalists, folks who trust ThinkPad's build quality and wouldn't be caught dead using any other keyboard. If you're more brand-agnostic, though, there are other Windows 8 convertibles with comfortable keyboards – not to mention, sharper screens, faster performance and longer battery life."

=== ThinkPad Helix (2013–2015) ===
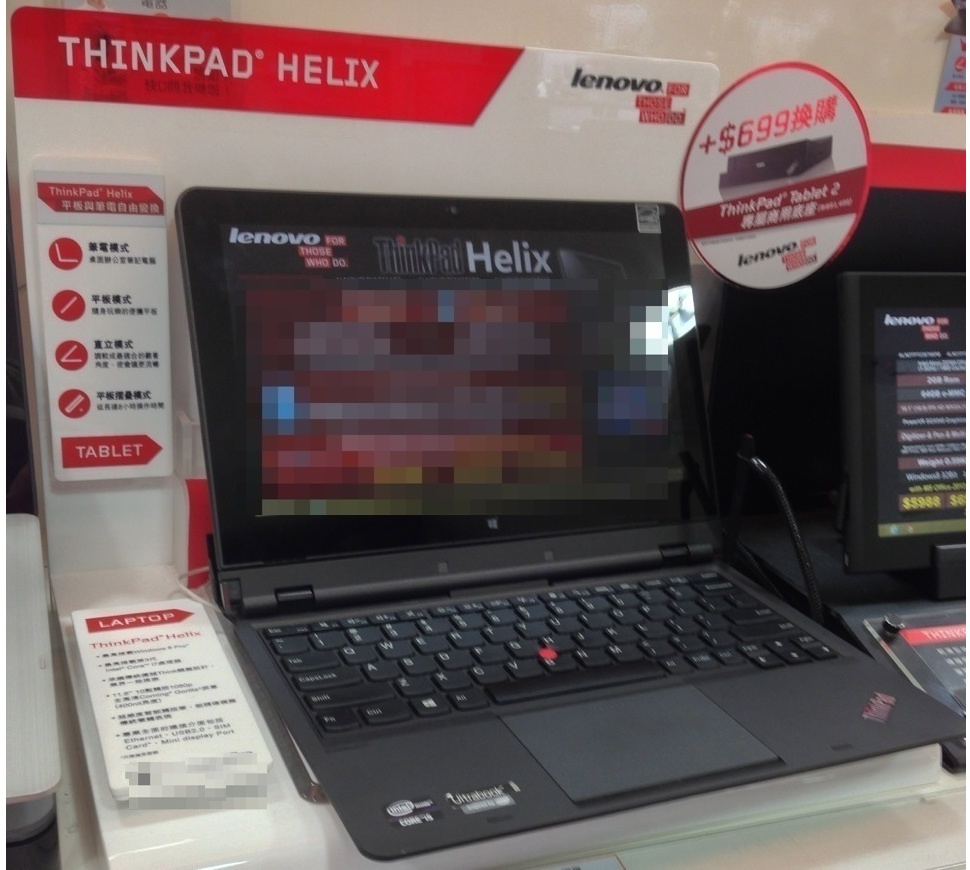
The ThinkPad Helix on display in Hong Kong

The Helix is a convertible laptop satisfying both tablet and conventional notebook users. It uses a "rip and flip" design that allows the user to detach the display and then replace it facing in a different direction. It sports an 11.6" Full HD (1920 × 1080) display, with support for Windows 8 multi-touch. As all essential processing hardware is contained in the display assembly and it has multitouch capability, the detached monitor can be used as a standalone tablet computer. The Helix's high-end hardware and build quality, including Gorilla Glass, stylus-based input, and Intel vPro hardware-based security features, are designed to appeal to business users.

In a review published in Forbes Jason Evangelho wrote, "The first laptop I owned was a ThinkPad T20, and the next one may very likely be the ThinkPad Helix which Lenovo unveiled at CES 2013. In a sea of touch-inspired Windows 8 hardware, it's the first ultrabook convertible with a form factor that gets everything right. The first batch of Windows 8 ultrabooks get high marks for their inspired designs, but aren't quite flexible enough to truly be BYOD (Bring Your Own Device) solutions. Lenovo's own IdeaPad Yoga came close, but the sensation of feeling the keyboard underneath your fingers when transformed into tablet mode was slightly jarring. Dell's XPS 12 solved that problem with its clever rotating hinge design, but I wanted the ability to remove the tablet display entirely from both of those products."

=== ThinkPad 11e (2014–2021) ===
The ThinkPad 11e was a low-cost laptop computer for schools and students with an 11-inch screen and without trackpoint. 11e Yoga is a convertible version of 11e.

=== ThinkPad 13 (2016–2018) ===
The ThinkPad 13 (also known as the Thinkpad S2 in mainland China) is a "budget" model with a 13-inch screen. Versions running Windows 10 and Google's ChromeOS were options. The most powerful configuration had a 6th generation Core i7 processor and a 512 GB SSD. Connectivity includes HDMI, USB 3.0, OneLink+, USB Type-C, etc. It weighs 1.0 kg (2.3 lb) and is 19.8 mm (0.78 in) thick. In 2017, a second generation Ultrabook model has been released with up to a 7th generation Core i7 processor and a FHD touchscreen available in certain countries. This lineup was merged into the L series in 2018, with the L380 being the successor to the 13 Gen 2.

=== 25th anniversary Retro ThinkPad (2017) ===
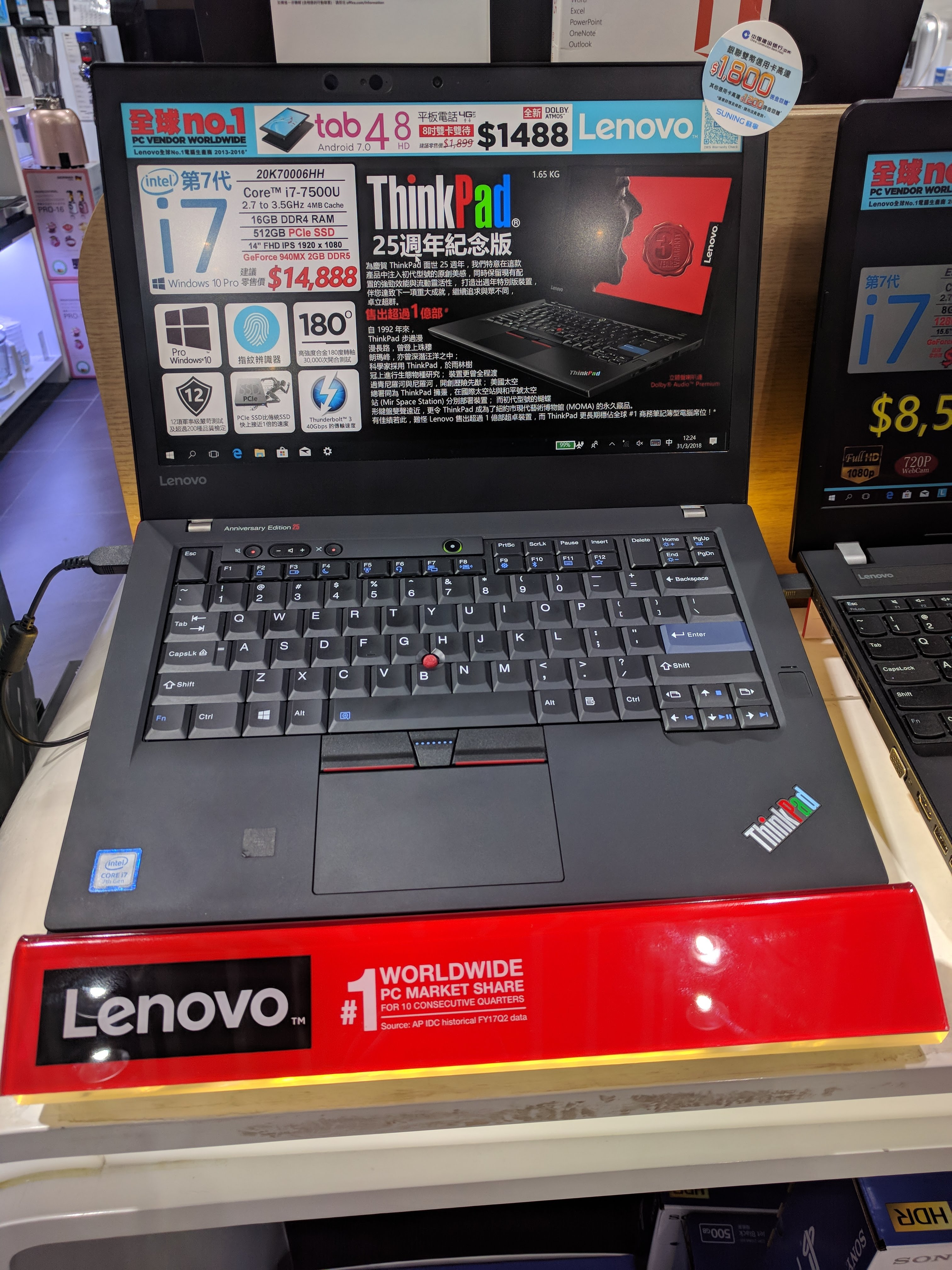
25th Anniversary Retro ThinkPad on display in Hong Kong

Lenovo released the 25th anniversary Retro ThinkPad 25 in October 2017. The model is based on the T470, the difference being it having the 7-Row "Classic" keyboard with the layout found on the −20 Series, and the logo received a splash of color reminiscent of the IBM era. The last ThinkPad models with the 7-row keyboard were introduced in 2011.

=== A series (2017–2018) ===
In September 2017, Lenovo announced two ThinkPad models featuring AMD's PRO chipset technology – the A275 and A475. This sees the revival of the A Series nameplate not seen since the early 2000s when ThinkPads were under IBM's ownership, however it is likely the "A" moniker emphasized that it uses AMD technology rather than comparative product segment (workstation class) of the previous line.

While this isn't the first time Lenovo had offered an AMD derived ThinkPad, it is the first to be released as an alternative premium offering to the established T series and X series ThinkPads, which use Intel processors instead.

A275 and A475
The A275 is a 12.5" ultraportable based on the Intel derived X270 model. Weighing in at 2.9 pounds (1.31 kg) this model features AMD Carrizo or Bristol Ridge APU's, AMD Radeon R7 graphics and AMD DASH (Desktop and mobile Architecture for System Hardware) for enterprise computing.

The A475 is a 14" mainstream portable computer based on the Intel derived T470 model. Weighing at 3.48 pounds (1.57 kg), like the A275 it features AMD Carrizo or Bristol Ridge APU's, AMD Radeon R7 graphics and AMD DASH (Desktop and mobile Architecture for System Hardware) for enterprise computing.

A285 and A485
The A285 is a 12.5" laptop which is an upgraded version of the A275. Weighing in at 2.78 lb (1.26 kg), this model utilizes an AMD Raven Ridge APU with integrated Vega graphics, specifically a Ryzen 5 PRO 2500U or Ryzen 7 PRO 2700. The laptop also contains a discrete Trusted Platform Module (dTPM) for data encryption and password protection, supporting TPM 2.0. Optional security features include a fingerprint scanner and smart card reader. The display's native resolution can be either 1366 × 768 or 1920 × 1080 depending on the configuration.

The A485 is a 14" laptop which is an upgraded version of the A475. Weighing 3.63 lb (1.65 kg), this model utilizes AMD's Raven Ridge APU's with integrated Vega graphics. This model can use multiple models of Raven Ridge APU's, unlike the A285. The laptop also contains a Discrete Trusted Platform Module (dTPM) for data encryption and password protection, supporting TPM 2.0. Optional security features include a fingerprint scanner and smart card reader. The display's native resolution can be either 1366 × 768 or 1920 × 1080 depending on the configuration.

== Accessories ==
Lenovo also makes a range of accessories meant to complement and enhance the experience of using a ThinkPad device. These include:

=== ThinkPad Stack (2015–2017) ===
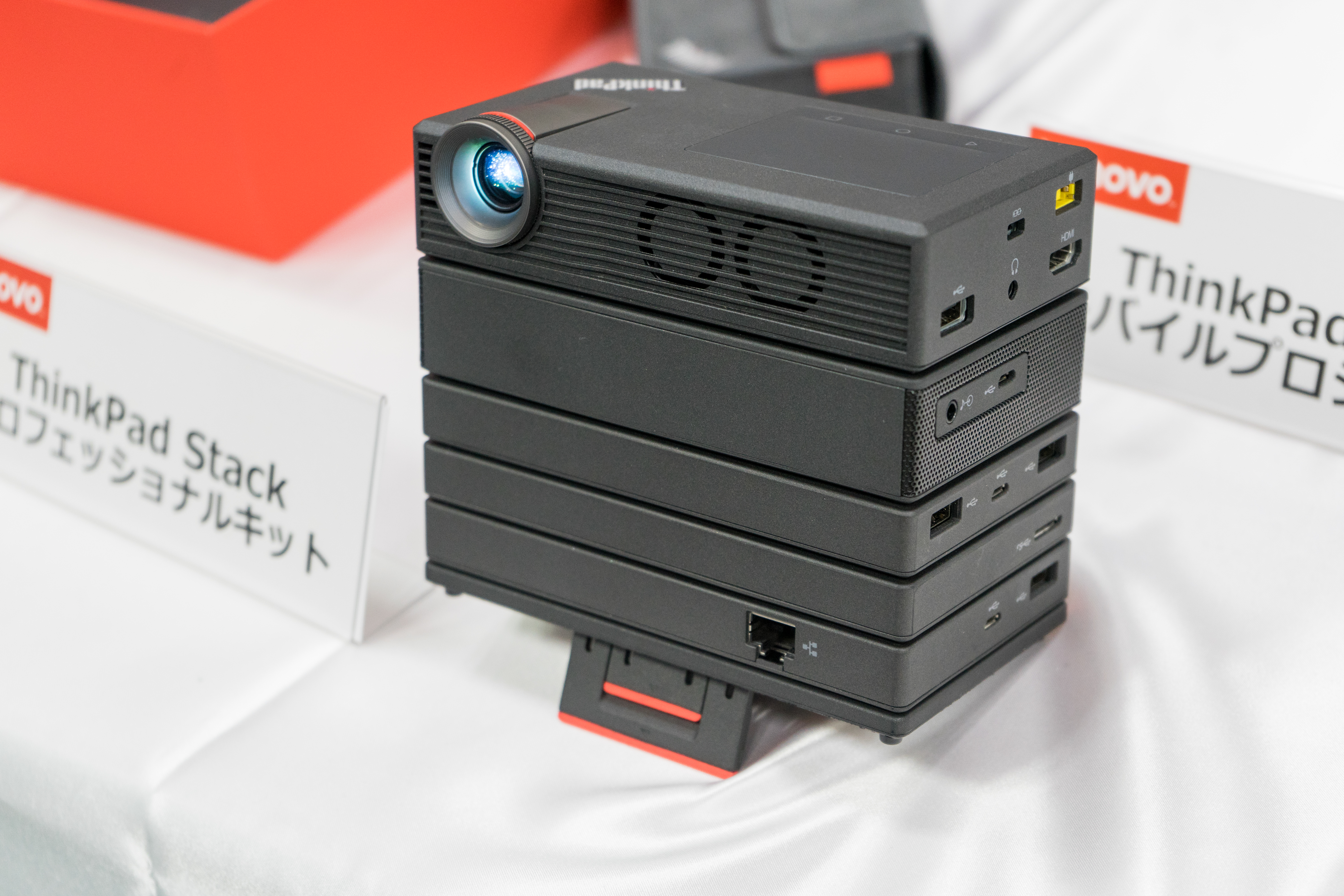
ThinkPad Stack

The ThinkPad Stack line of products includes accessories designed for portability and interoperability. This line includes external hard drives, a wireless router, a power bank, and a Bluetooth 4.0 speaker. Each Stack device includes rubber feet, magnets, and pogo-pin power connections that allow the use of a single cable. The combined weight of all the Stack devices is slightly less than a single kilogram. The Stack series was announced in January 2015 at the International CES. The Stack series of accessories was expanded at the 2016 International CES to include a 720p resolution projector with 150 lumens of brightness and a wireless charging station (However, the wireless charger was never released).

The Stack has a "blocky, black, and rectangular" look with the ThinkPad logo. It shares a common design language with ThinkPad laptop computers.

=== Docking stations (1993–current) ===
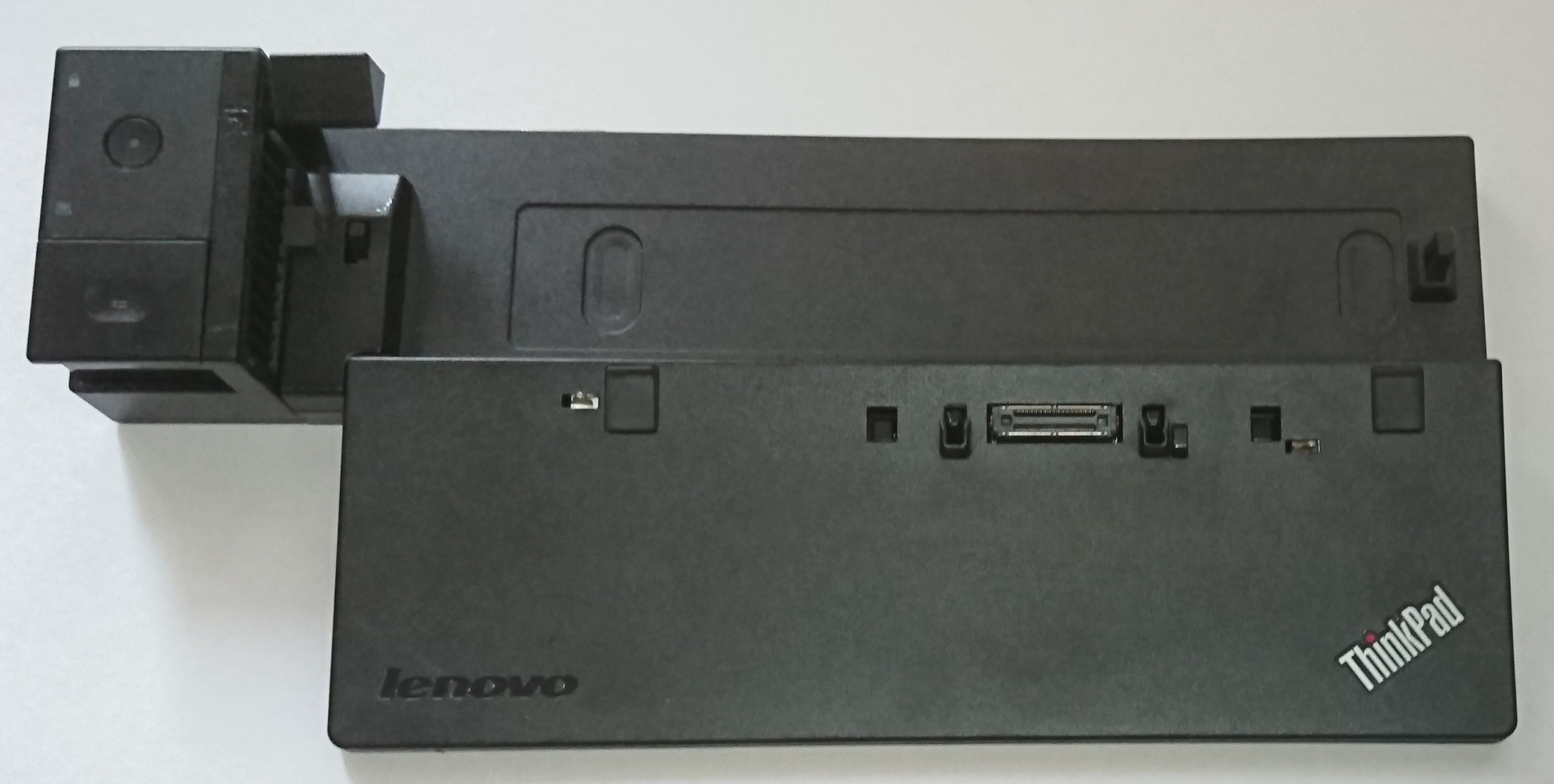
Ultra Docking Station for the T470, T460, T450, L440, L540, X240, T540, T440, T440s, and W540 laptops

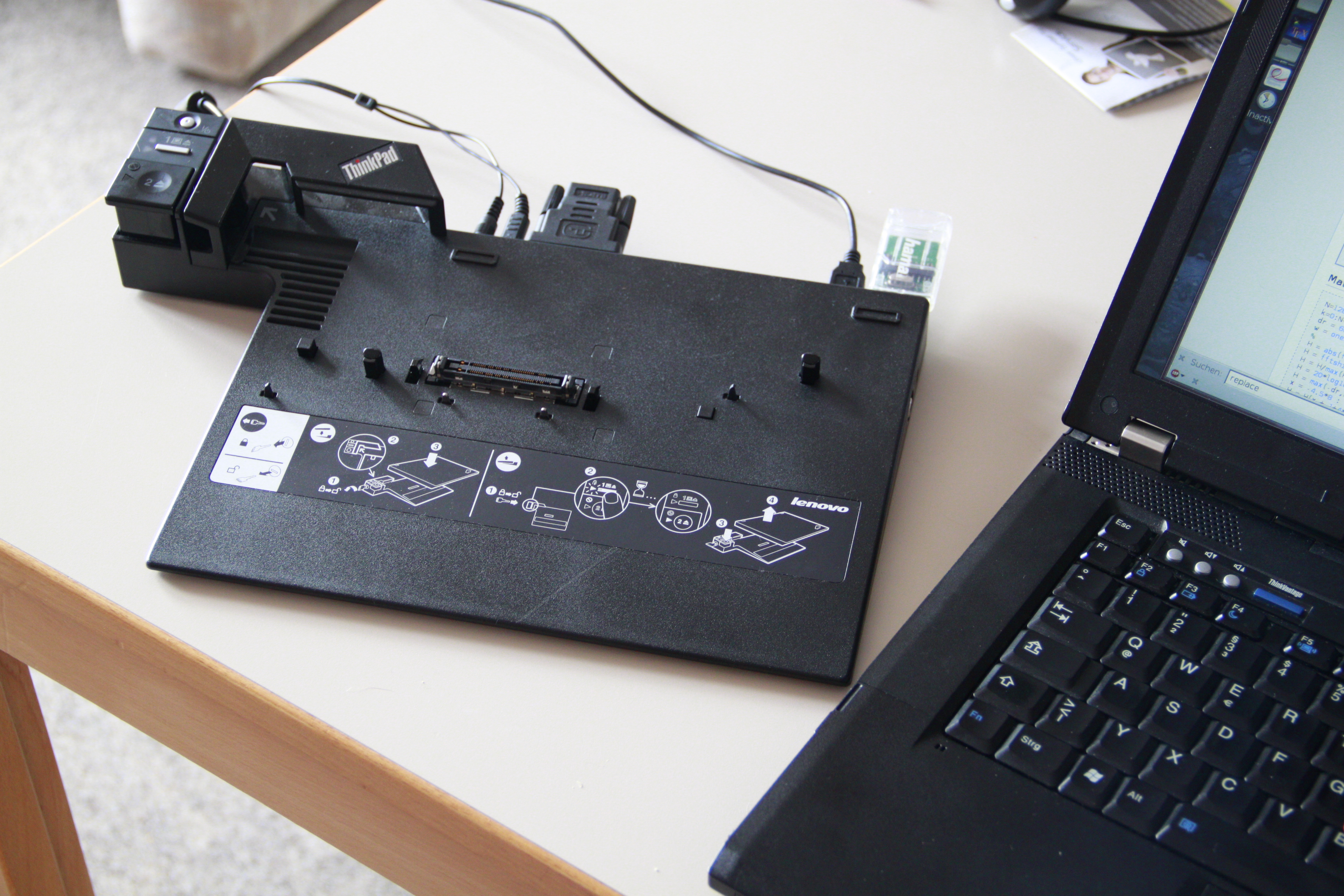
Docking station for the T60, T61 and T400/T500 laptops

The ThinkPad laptop line has a history of using docking stations to enhance functionality and connectivity. These stations provide additional ports, peripherals, and larger displays, transforming the laptop into a desktop-like setup. There are three types of ThinkPad docking stations: Port Replicators, which replicate the ports found on the laptop, Advanced Docking Stations, which offer more extensive functionality, built-in speakers, microphones, and card readers, and Desktop Docking Stations, which transform the ThinkPad into a desktop setup with a larger monitor, keyboard, and mouse.

Current docking stations (or docks) add much of the functional abilities of a desktop computer, including multiple display outputs, additional USB ports, and occasionally other features. This allows the ThinkPads to be connected and disconnected from various peripherals quickly and easily.

Old docks connected via a proprietary connector located on the underside of the laptops. Current docks connect via Thunderbolt or USB-C.

=== UltraBay (1995–2014) ===
The internal replaceable (hot-swappable) CD-drive bay that supports a list of optional components, such as a CD-/DVD/Blu-ray drives, hard drive caddies, additional batteries, or device cradles.

=== Slice batteries (2000–2012) ===
Some classic models (IBM and early Lenovo T and X series) can support an additional slice battery which mounts to the underside of the machine instead of the UltraBay additional battery.

=== UltraPort (2000–2002) ===
IBM UltraPort was a non-standard USB 1.1 port used by IBM on its range of ThinkPad laptop computers. It was designed in 1999 in response to the proliferation of many laptop computers from Sony, Fujitsu, and others that had built-in cameras, but a proprietary predecessor can be found on a ThinkPad 850, released in 1996.

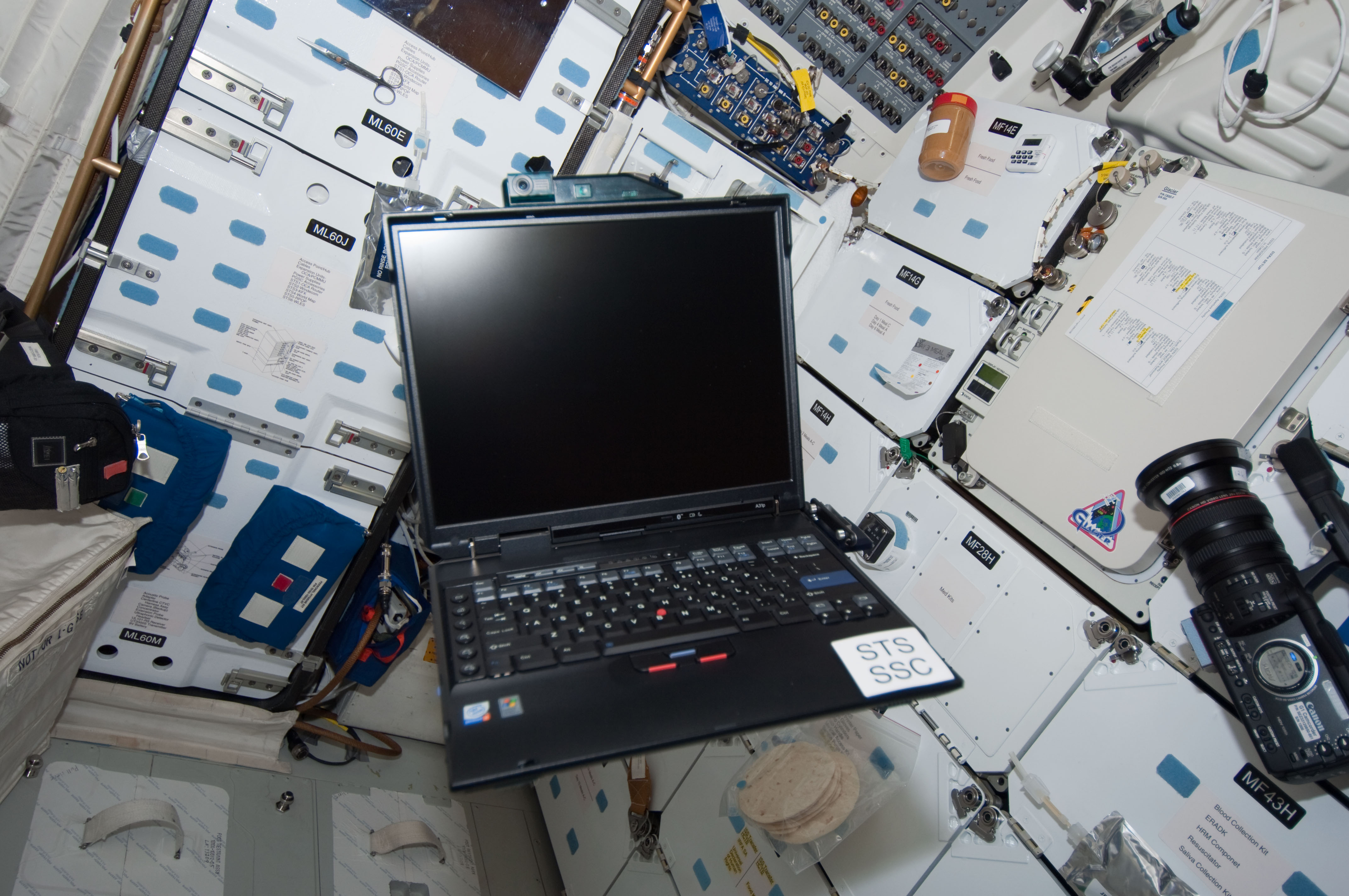
An IBM ThinkPad A-series with UltraPort web camera

Electronically, the UltraPort connector is identical to the standard USB port. Since it uses a proprietary mechanical connection, UltraPort devices cannot be plugged into a normal USB interface. However, UltraPort devices shipped with an adapter could be attached to a regular USB port.

Select ThinkPad models from 2000 to 2002 came with an UltraPort connector on the top edge of a laptop screen, and IBM sold a variety of laptop-relevant UltraPort devices, including webcams, speakers, and microphone arrays.

=== ThinkPad USB 3.0 Secure Hard Drive ===
An external USB 3.0/2.0 hard drive that was designed by Lenovo in 2009. It requires the input of a 4 digit PIN to access data and this can be set by the user. These drives are manufactured for Lenovo by Apricorn, Inc.

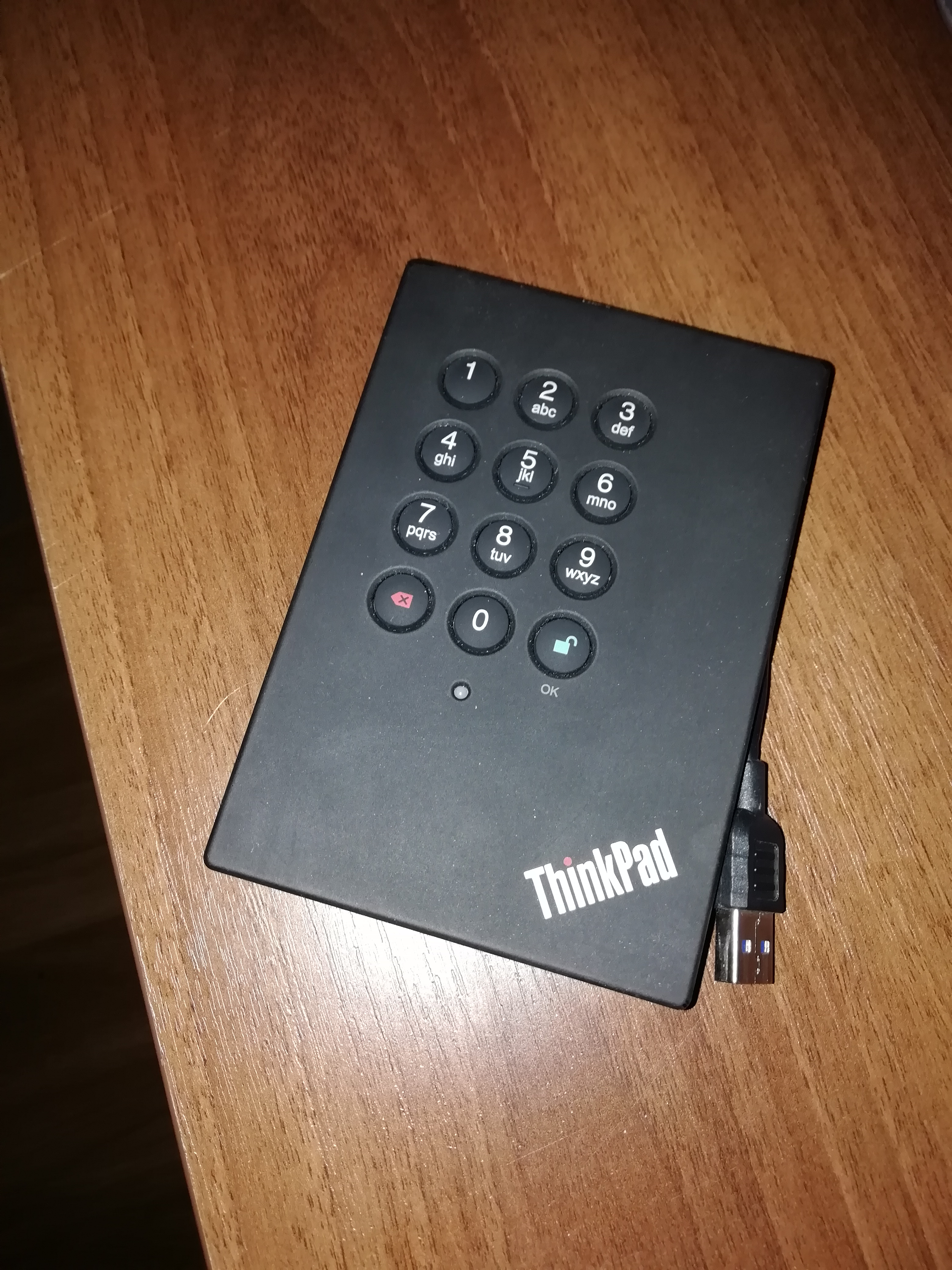
ThinkPad USB 3.0 Secure Hard Drive

=== ThinkPad keyboards (external) ===
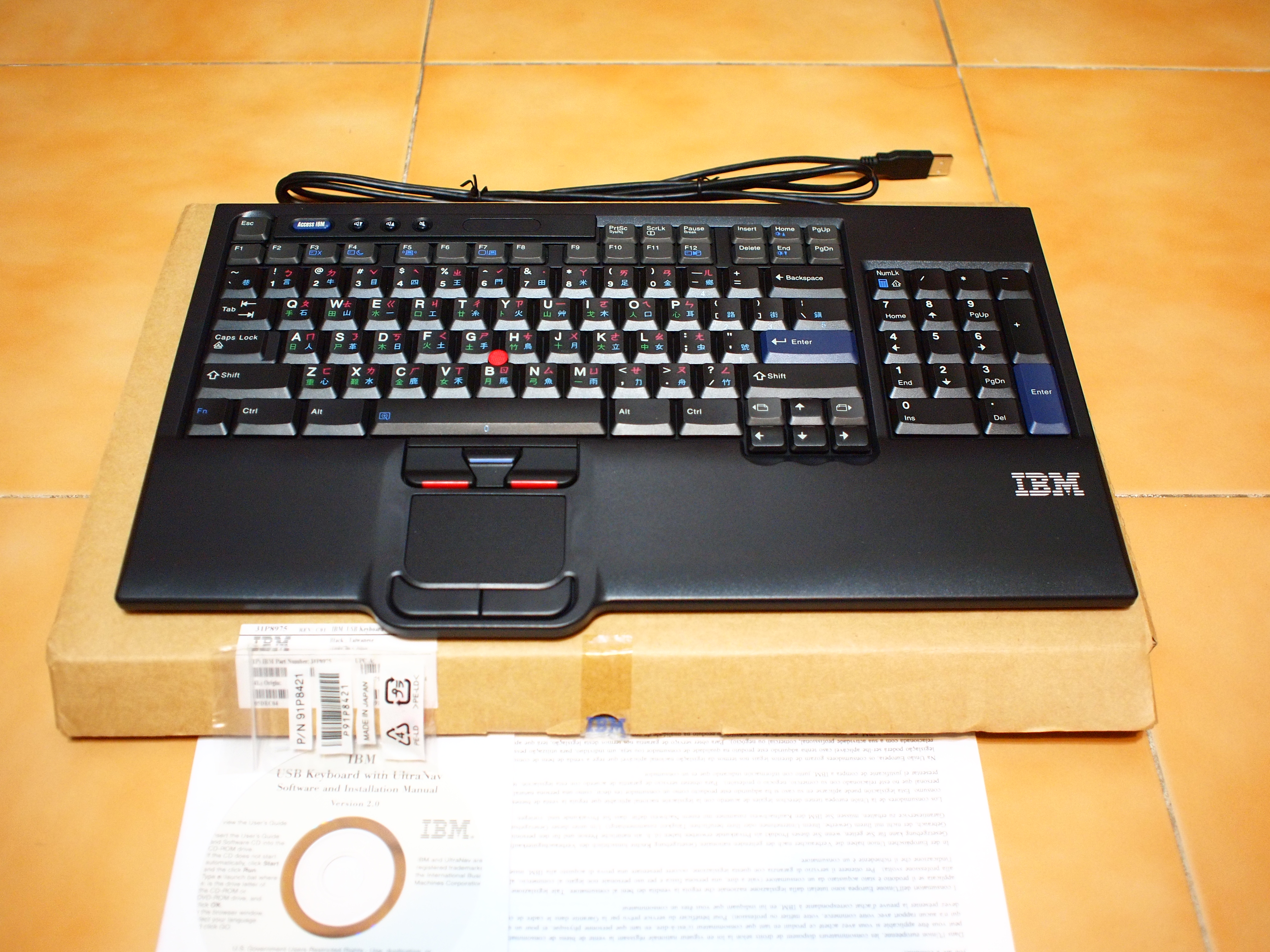
Classic 7-row UltraNav keyboard with touchpad and TrackPoint

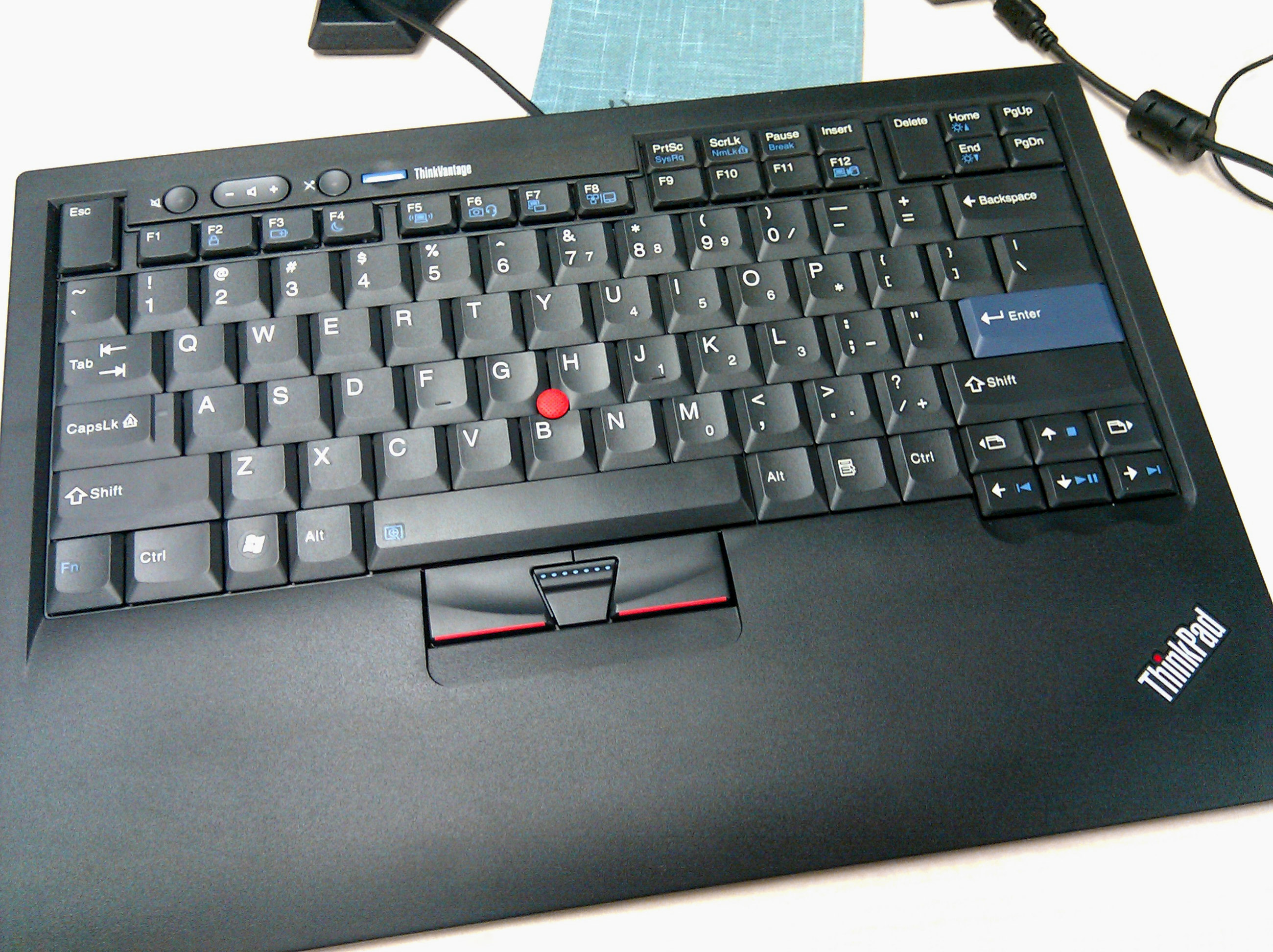
Classic 7-row TrackPoint Keyboard

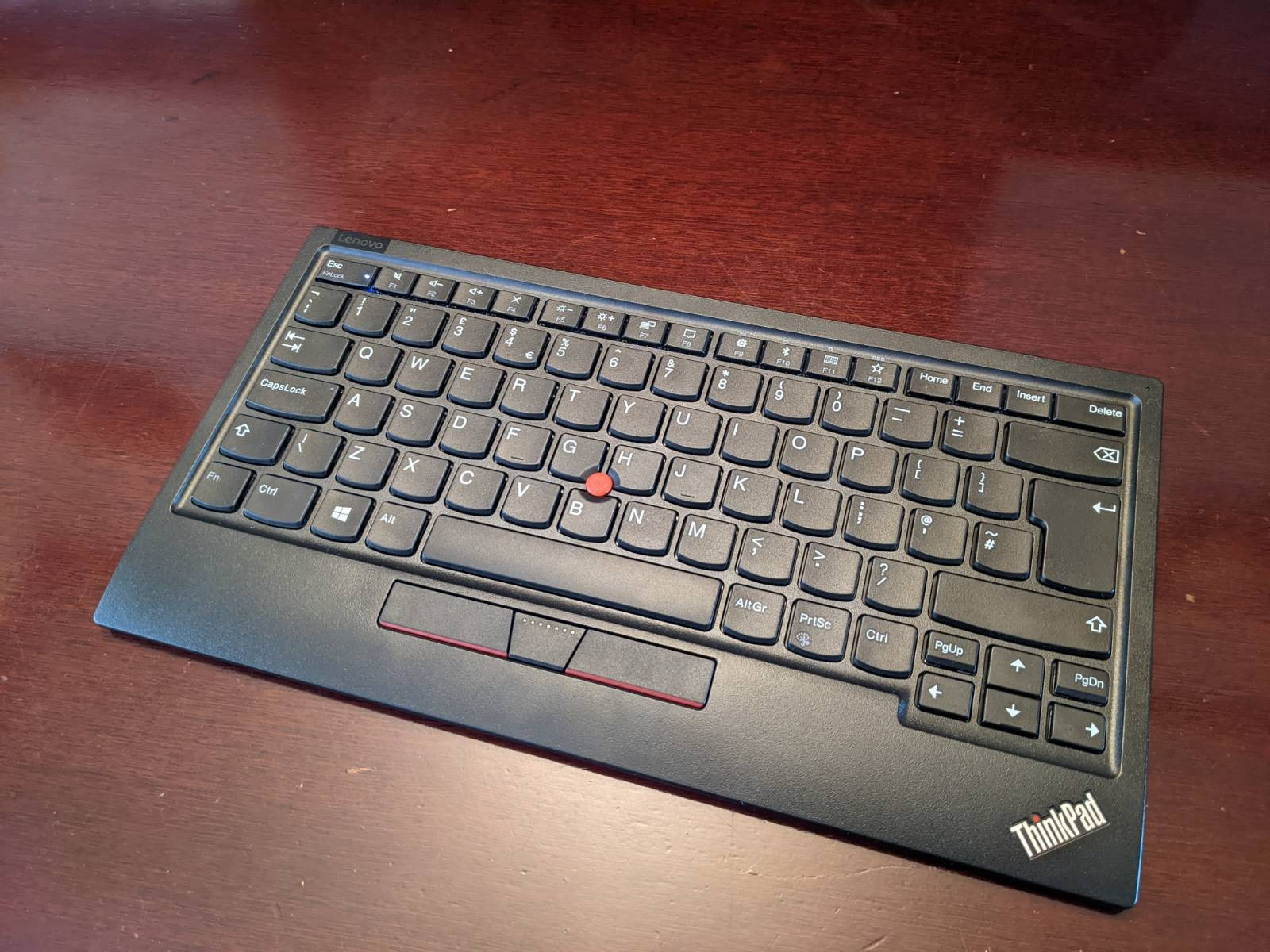
6-row TrackPoint Keyboard II

IBM/Lenovo made several USB/Bluetooth keyboards with integrated UltraNav's and TrackPoints. Notable models include

1. SK-8845
2. SK-8835
3. SK-8855
4. ThinkPad Compact USB Keyboard (current model)
5. ThinkPad Compact Bluetooth Keyboard (current model)
6. ThinkPad TrackPoint Keyboard II (current model)

=== ThinkPad Mouses ===
ThinkPad Mouses come in several different varieties ranging from Bluetooth ones through wired ones, to even ones with a trackpoint built-in and labelled as a scroll point.

=== ThinkPad stands ===
The ThinkPad Stands were a series of laptop stands designed for ThinkPad laptops, primarily sold in Asian markets. They offered various features to enhance user experience and ergonomics. Key features included adjustable height settings, cooling features, ergonomic design, and portability. These stands allowed users to find the most comfortable viewing angle, dissipate heat from the laptop, promote a healthy posture, and provide a convenient solution for improving laptop usage. They were particularly popular among ThinkPad users in Asian markets, particularly those who spent long hours working on their laptops. The ThinkPad Stands were a significant addition to the laptop market.

=== ThinkPlus charger ===
The ThinkPlus charger is a power adapter designed for Lenovo ThinkPad laptops, providing the necessary power to charge the battery and operate the device. Its key features include compatibility with specific ThinkPad models, varying power output (typically measured in watts), and the ability to operate with different input voltages. Built-in safety features protect the charger and laptop from overheating, overvoltage, and short circuits. ThinkPlus chargers are compact and lightweight, making them easy to carry around. There are three types of ThinkPlus chargers: AC Adapters, designed for wall outlets, car chargers for vehicles, and travel chargers, making them ideal for travel.

== Timeline ==
Timeline of the IBM Personal Computer

Asterisk (*) denotes a model released in Japan only

== See also ==
- ThinkBook
- IBM/Lenovo ThinkCentre and ThinkStation business desktops
- List of IBM products
- HP EliteBook and ProBook
- Dell Latitude and Precision
- Fujitsu Lifebook and Celsius
- Lenovo ThinkPad X220
- Lenovo ThinkPad W700
- Lenovo ThinkPad T410
