= DTI =

DTI may refer to:

== Science and technology ==
- Deep trench isolation; See Shallow trench isolation
- Dial test indicator
- Direct trader input, in the history of electronic data interchange
- Diffusion tensor imaging, a structural magnetic resonance imaging technique
- Direct thrombin inhibitor
- Diesel turbo injection, a brand name for common rail
- Direct tension indicator
- Deep tissue injury, see suspected deep tissue injury in List of medical abbreviations: S

== Organizations ==
- Defence Technology Institute, the Thai defence technology public organisation
- Department of Trade and Industry (disambiguation), a government department in several countries
- Detroit, Toledo and Ironton Railroad
- Diversified Technology, Inc.
- Directorate of Terrorist Identities, responsible for the Terrorist Identities Datamart Environment
- Display Technologies, Inc., a joint venture of IBM and Toshiba
- DT Infrastructure, Australian construction company

== Other uses ==
- Debt-to-income ratio, in mortgages
- Dress to Impress (video game), on Roblox
