= ThinkPad 300 =

Computer model by IBM

IBM Thinkpad 300

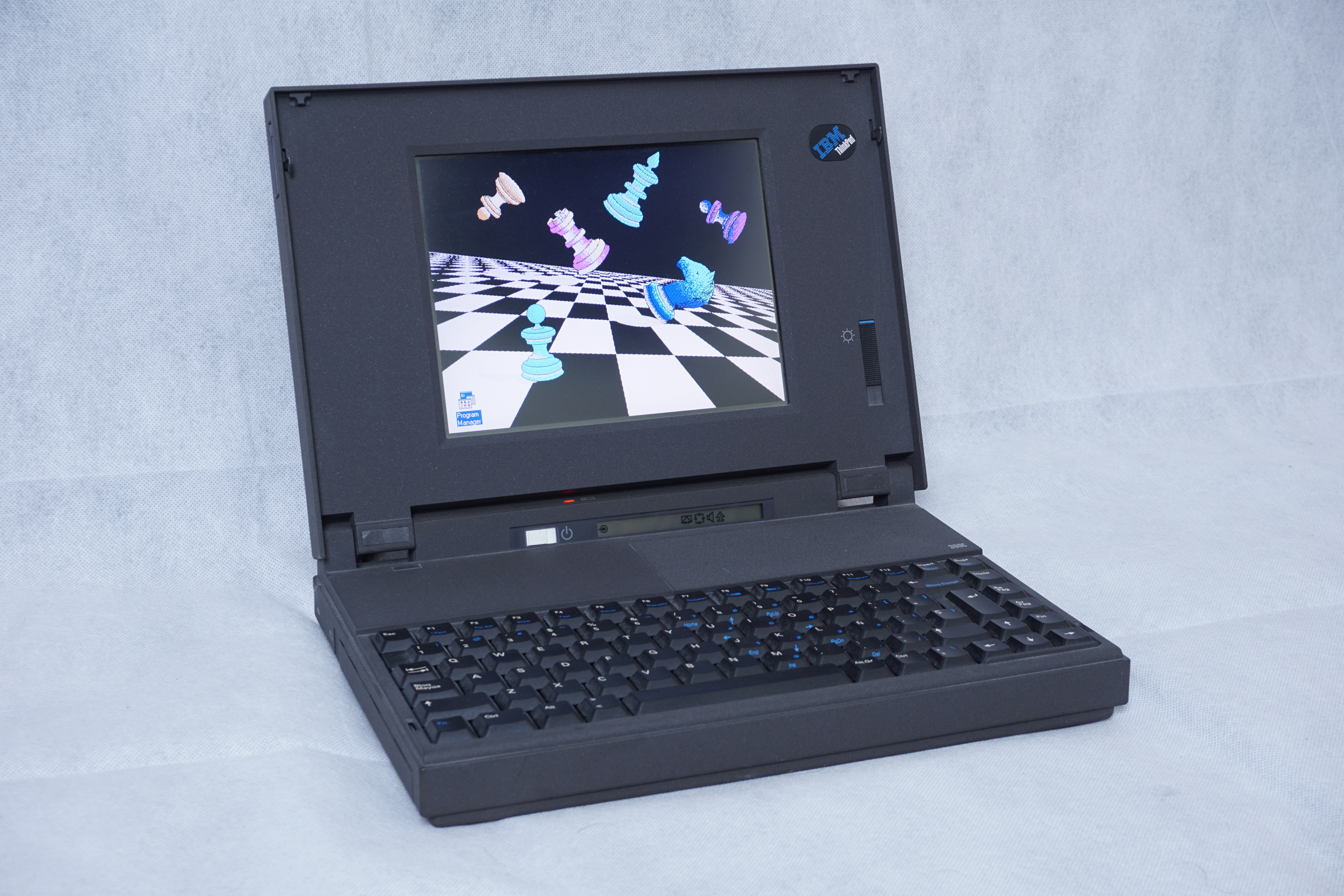
- An IBM ThinkPad 300C running the Windows 3.1 desktop
- Manufacturer: Zenith Data Systems IBM
- Type: Notebook computer
- Released: October 1992; 33 years ago
- Introductory price: Starting at US$2,375 (equivalent to $5,449 in 2025)
- Operating system: MS-DOS 5.0; OS/2 2.0; Windows 3.1x
- CPU: Intel 80386SL @ 25 MHz
- Memory: 4-12 MB

The IBM ThinkPad 300 is a notebook computer series that was created by Zenith Data Systems for IBM. It was released in North America in October 1992, alongside the ThinkPad 700 series. It was the second series for the ThinkPad line of notebook computers, and was a cost saving alternative to the 700. It was however known as one of IBM's failures, with most not working properly or being dead after leaving the production line. It was also grey instead of black, and was missing a TrackPoint, which made them unappealing to consumers. The ThinkPad 300 was received as decent, but did not sell well.

== Development ==
Contrary to earlier IBM computers, IBM sought for an OEM to develop the 300. Eventually, executive authorization was granted. Because of a pre-existing agreement with Zenith/BULL, IBM negotiated with them about the notebook that would become the 300.

The ThinkPad 300 was made by Zenith Data Systems, instead of IBM. It was launched on October 5, 1992 alongside the ThinkPad 700 series.

Although introduced at a price of $2,375, by February of 1993 the price dropped to $1,999 then even lower to $1,699 by May of 1993. This was due to poor sales of the ThinkPad 300.

== Specifications ==
The 300 was based on the 25 MHz Intel 386SL with 4 MB of memory, and had a nickel metal hydride battery that was claimed by IBM to last up to 10 hours. It also had the option of an 80 or 120 MB hard disk drive and it had a 9.5in 640x480 monochrome screen with 64 scales of grey. Other features it had was PC DOS 5.0 preinstalled, and for ports was a modem, serial, VGA, parallel, Ethernet, and port replicator. Alongside the hard drive, it had a built in 3 1/2 1.44 MB floppy disk drive.

As the 300 was meant to be low-end and cheaper, it was missing some features the 700 series had, such as the TrackPoint device.

Although the ThinkPad came with monochrome screens, they could later be upgraded to an active color TFT screen.

== Comparison ==
	300	300C
Display	9.5in 640x480 Monochrome STN	9.5in 640x480 Color TFT
Video Controller	WD90C24	
Audio Controller	None (PC Speaker only)	
Pointing Device	None (Serial mouse only)	
CPU	80386SL @ 25 MHz	
RAM	4-12 MB	
Disk	80 or 120 MB HDD	

== Reception ==
PC Mag regarded the ThinkPad 300 as a decent choice, thanks to the good screen and above average battery life backed by flexible power management.

Preceded by IBM PS/2 Note IBM PS/2 CL57SX	IBM ThinkPad 300	Succeeded by IBM ThinkPad 350
