= IBM PS/2 Note and PS/note =

Laptop by IBM

- Manufacturer: IBM
- Type: Notebook computer
- Released: 1992
- Discontinued: 1994
- CPU: Intel 386

The IBM PS/2 Note and PS/note are a series of notebooks from the PS/2 line by IBM. It was announced in March 1992, half a year prior to the release of the first ThinkPad, the IBM ThinkPad 700. The series was discontinued in 1994.

== Background ==
After the departure of Bob Lawten from IBM, the team at IBM had little development direction after the IBM PS/2 L40 SX. James Cannavino pushed for the new notebook series, which fell behind schedule. The N45 SL, N51 SX and N51 SLC were announced on the same day as the IBM PS/2 (color laptop) CL57 SX. During this time there was a distinction between notebooks and laptops, where the former are A4 sized and the latter are larger.

The notebooks were modeled after the PS/55 Note which was released by IBM in Japan in April 1991.

== Models ==
IBM PS/55 note, PS/2 note, and PS/note models
	1991	1992	1993	1994
PS/2 note	N33 SX	N51 SX; N51 SLC		
PS/note		182; E82; N82	425/425C	
PS/note		N45 SL		

=== PS/55 note ===
Simply branded as PS/55 note, the type 5523-S0x was the first Japanese notebook from the 55-series with a 12Mhz 80386 CPU, 2Mb RAM built in and a 9.5" 16-greyscale VGA LCD (640x480). It was only released in Japan. The two main planars inside consisted of two separate boards "APEX-MAIN" and "SUB-BOARD" leaving room inside for either a floppy drive or a hard drive - but not both. The keyboard has a 7-row layout only. It was not common for IBM to add codenames or words to their internal PCBs, suggesting some influence from outside IBM.

=== PS/55 note N23 SX ===
This was a second generation PS/55 note type 5523-S1x with N23 SX added to its case badge and also only released in Japan. This machine had a 16Mhz 80386 CPU and a redesigned motherboard consisting of just one planar. The additional space inside meant the machine could accommodate both an internal floppy disk drive and a hard drive. It also featured an external VGA output and display invert switch. The main planar inside has "EXCEL-MAIN" written on it.

=== PS/2 note N33 SX ===
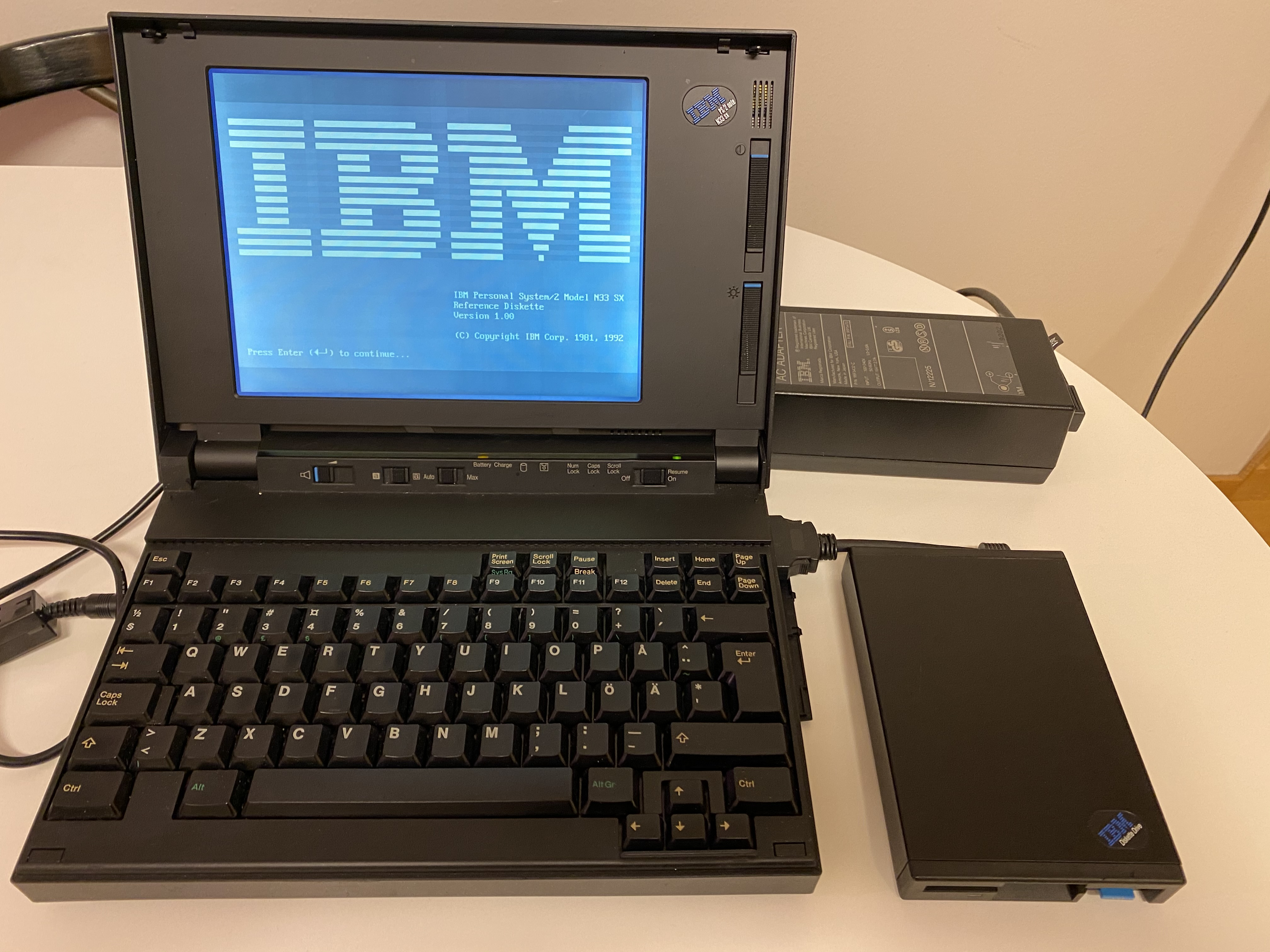
IBM PS/2 Note N33 SX with external floppy drive

The PS/2 Model N33 SX (also known as PS/2 note N33 SX) was the first Western-released notebook-sized computer from IBM which was announced in 1991. This model was based on the AT-bus and had between 2 or 6MB RAM. It has a 9.5" 16-greyscale VGA LCD (640x480), external 1.44MB floppy connector, expansion ports and a 40MB or 80MB HDD, and weighs 5.5 lb (2.5 kg). There were two versions with one based on the original Japanese 12Mhz PS/55 Note and the other based on the Japanese 16Mhz N23 SX. The main two changes is that neither had internal floppy drives and they both had a Western keyboard.

=== PS/ note C23 SX ===
A joint third generation PS/Note took the ISA-bus N23SX and added a 10.4" colour TFT panel from the CL57, but successfully miniaturised to fit within the smaller notebook lid. They were branded 'Thinkpad' on the colour IBM logo.

=== PS/2 note N51 SX ===
The joint third generation PS/2 Note N51 SX (or PS/2 Model N51 SX) was a low-end mainstream notebook with the new MCA bus, which contained a slower version of the typical 386SX found in other notebooks. The N51 SX was delayed for months.

=== PS/2 note N51 SLC ===
The PS/2 Note N51 SLC (or PS/2 Model N51 SLC) was based on IBM their 386SLC. This MCA-bus model has a PS/55 note sibling.

=== PS/ note N45 SL ===
Manufactured by Zenith, the PS/note N45 SL was priced at $2,045 and contains a 25 MHz 386SL. It had 2MB RAM and an 80 or 120MB HDD and was equipped with only 6-row keyboard without dedicated navigation block, the similar layout as a low-end ThinkPad 300 laptop.

PC Mag considered the display a disappointment, but noted its good design and performance.

It was manufactured by Zenith Data Systems.

=== PS/note T22 SX ===
The T22 SX is an unusual non-backlite greyscale tablet and detachable keyboard offshoot from the main note range. It sold in small numbers.

=== PS/note 182/E82/N82 ===
A side project with Lexmark, the PS/note 182 and PS/note E82 was equipped with 80386SL CPU, PS/note N82 was equipped with 80386SX and released in 1992. This line has a 7-row keyboard layout and similar to next-year PS/note 425 model case (but with gray case color and without TrackPoint). The case badge uniquely resembled the style of the PS/1.

=== Model 425/425C ===
The PS/note 425/425C are identical to the ThinkPad 350/350C.

== Accessories ==
- Communication cartridge
- Communication cartridge II
- External floppy disk drive
- External numpad

== Discontinuation ==
In March 1994, it was reported that IBM would consolidate the PS/note series into the ThinkPad 300 series. In May 1994, the ThinkPad 360 series was released.

== Timeline ==
Timeline of the IBM Personal Computer

Asterisk (*) denotes a model released in Japan only
