= Trade industry =

Trade industry may refer to:

- Trade, the exchange of goods
- Trade association
- Retail industry
- Activity related to providing trade (occupation)
- Department of Trade and Industry (disambiguation), a division of government
