= IBM PC Convertible =

1986 laptop computer by IBM

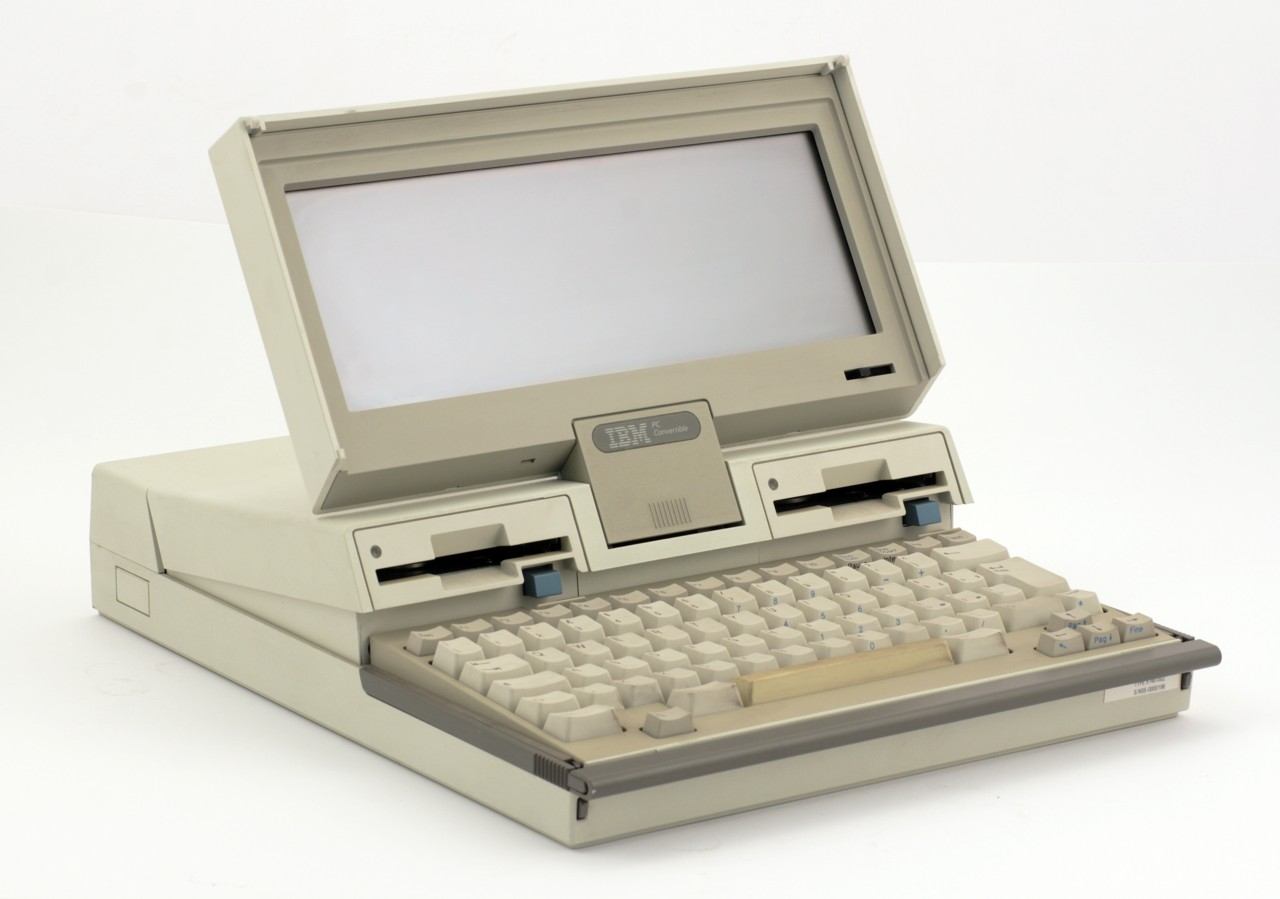
- IBM PC Convertible
- Released: April 2, 1986; 40 years ago
- Introductory price: US$2,000 (equivalent to $5,870 in 2025)
- Discontinued: August 7, 1989; 37 years ago
- Operating system: IBM PC DOS with custom icon-oriented shell interface
- CPU: Intel 8088 CPU @ 4.77 MHz
- Memory: 256 KB of RAM (expandable to 640 KB)
- Storage: Dual 720 KB 3.5-inch floppy drives
- Display: Monochrome CGA-compatible LCD
- Graphics: 80x25 (text), 640x200, and 320x200
- Power: Battery: 9.6v/2400mAh (NiCd); Power supply: 15 VDC, 2.7A.
- Weight: 13 pounds (5.8 kg)
- Predecessor: IBM Portable Personal Computer
- Successor: IBM PS/2 L40 SX (IBM PS/2 note)

The IBM PC Convertible (model 5140) is a laptop computer made by IBM, first sold in April 1986. The Convertible was IBM's first laptop-style computer, following the luggable IBM Portable, and introduced the 3½-inch floppy disk format to the IBM product line. Like modern laptops, it featured power management and the ability to run from batteries.

It was replaced in 1991 by the IBM PS/2 L40 SX, and in Japan by the IBM Personal System/55note, the predecessor to the ThinkPad.

== Predecessors ==
IBM had been working on a laptop for some time before the Convertible. In 1983, work was underway on a laptop similar to the Tandy Model 100, codenamed "Sweetpea", but it was rejected by Don Estridge for not being PC compatible. Another attempt in 1984 produced the "P-14" prototype machine, but it failed to pass IBM's human factors tests, especially after poor public reception of the display in the competing Data General-One.

== Description ==
The PC Convertible came in three models: PC Convertible, PC Convertible Model 2 and PC Convertible Model 3. The latter two were released in October 1987 and are primarily distinguished by their LCD panels. The original Convertible used a non-backlit panel which was considered difficult to read. The Model 2 lacked a backlight as well but upgraded to an improved supertwist panel, and the Model 3 included a backlight. The other hardware specifications are largely the same for all three models.

The CPU is an Intel 80C88, the CMOS version of the Intel 8088 CPU. The base configuration included 256 KB of RAM, expandable to 640 KB, dual 720 KB 3.5-inch floppy drives, and a monochrome, CGA-compatible LCD screen. It weighed just over 12 pounds and featured a built-in carrying handle, with a battery rated for 10 hours (4 hours in the backlit Model 3).

The first model was introduced at a price of $1,995, the Model 2 at $1,395 with 256K of RAM and $1,900 with 640K, and the Model 3 at $1,695 with 256K of RAM.

The LCD screen displayed 80 × 25 characters, but has a very wide aspect ratio, so text characters and graphics are compressed vertically, appearing half their normal height. The display is capable of 80 × 25 text and graphics modes of 640 × 200 and 320 × 200 pixels.

The PC Convertible has expansion capabilities through a proprietary ISA-based port on the rear of the machine. Extension modules, including a small printer and a video output module, were provided as plastic modules that snap into place. The machine can also take an internal modem, but has no room for an internal hard disk. The concept and the design of the body was made by German industrial designer Richard Sapper who also made black prototypes.

Pressing the power button on the computer does not turn it off, but puts the machine into "suspend" mode, which will hold the machine's state as long as battery power lasts, to save on boot time. The CMOS 80C88 CPU has a static core, which holds its state indefinitely by stopping the system clock oscillator, and can resume processing when the clock signal is restarted as long as it is kept powered. The system RAM in the Convertible is SRAM rather than DRAM, both for lower power consumption and less circuitry to fit into the cramped laptop case.

Pressing a lever between the two floppy drives just below the display detaches the entire screen from the unit. This feature allows the use of a full-size desktop monitor while at one's desk, an early forerunner of the "docking station" concept, and similar to Apple's PowerBook Duo.

== Reception ==
The industry expected the PC Convertible to first appear in public for a large IRS contract in 1986. Zenith Data Systems unexpectedly won the contract with the Zenith Z-171. By 1989 IBM was a laggard in the laptop market compared to leaders Toshiba, Zenith, and Grid Systems; InfoWorld described the PC Convertible as "a dismal failure" because of high price and inferior technology. The machine had difficulty in the marketplace and was seen as a poor value for money, since other laptops in the market had more built-in features, although it enjoyed some success with business users, who saw its battery life and portability as selling points.

Even after the release of the Model 3 in October 1987, which fixed some of the machine's issues, lack of built-in features remained a pain point. The parallel, serial and video ports all required adapters, while competing machines included these as integrated features. The Convertible was also heavy, not much faster than the Portable it replaced, and had a hard-to-read, oddly-shaped LCD screen. It also competed against faster portables based on the Intel 80286 that offered optional hard drives, from companies such as Compaq, and laptops from companies such as Toshiba and Zenith that were lighter and offered similar specifications, sometimes at half the price. The keyboard was also criticized for lacking several important keys.

== Timeline ==
Timeline of the IBM Personal Computer

Asterisk (*) denotes a model released in Japan only

== See also ==
- IBM PS/55note
- History of laptops
- Convertible (computer)
