= ThinkPad 310 =

Computer model by IBM

IBM Thinkpad 310

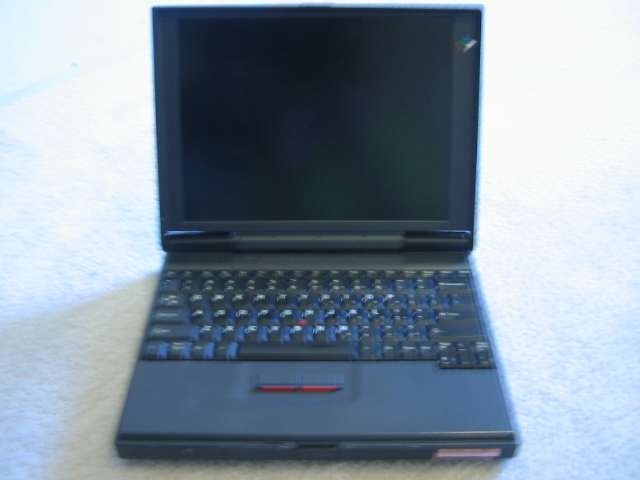
- IBM ThinkPad 310ED
- Manufacturer: IBM
- Type: Notebook Computer
- Released: June 1997; 29 years ago
- Introductory price: Starting at US$1,600 (equivalent to $3,209 in 2025)
- Operating system: Windows 95
- CPU: Pentium I @ 133 or 165 MHz
- Memory: 16-32 MB

IBM ThinkPad 310 was a notebook computer series introduced in 1997, manufactured by Acer for the IBM corporation as part of their ThinkPad laptop series. It was essentially a rebadged Acer Acernote Light 370pc and being released after the 345, 365 and 370C models, it has virtually no lineage to the other 3xx model range. It was succeeded by an IBM-manufactured ThinkPad 380 series.

== Features ==
All models shipped with Windows 95 OSR2 but were capable of running up to Windows XP, if they have a sufficient RAM upgrade, as well as several Linux variations. They could also run older operating systems such as Windows 3.1.

All models featured a Socket 7 Intel Pentium I or MMX processor running at 133 to 166 MHz, a CT-65550 video chip with 1 MB of video memory, and a Yamaha YMF715 audio controller. The standard memory size was 16 MB, with up to 32 MB max if upgraded.

The ThinkPad models ending with a D included a CD-ROM drive; the rest included a 1.44 MB floppy disk drive. Models with a CD-ROM drive had a proprietary external floppy disk drive port on the back.

== Models ==
- IBM ThinkPad 310 — The base model released only in Europe, it featured an Intel Pentium I running at 133 MHz, 16 MB of soldered EDO RAM, standard 1.08 GB hard drive, and a non-removable 1.44MB floppy disk drive. It also had an 11.3" 800x600 DSTN display with the additional option of an 11.3" 800x600 TFT display. Other features included: NiHM battery, Trackpoint, (2) Type II CardBus slots or (1) type III.
- IBM ThinkPad 310D — Released alongside the 310 but available worldwide, it had essentially the same specifications as the base 310 model, with the only difference of a CD-ROM drive over the 1.44 floppy disk drive. It also only had an 11.3" 800x600 DSTN display over the base 310's additional TFT display option.
- IBM ThinkPad 310E — Made available late 1997, the E had a few new features. It featured an Intel Pentium MMX 166 MHz processor, 16 MB of soldered EDO RAM, 1.6 or 2.1 GB hard drive size options, and a 1.44 MB floppy disk drive. It came with a larger 12.1" 800x600 DSTN display with the additional option of an 11.3" 800x600 TFT display. It also came with a NiHM battery which could last up to 2.8 hours on one charge. Other features included: Trackpoint, (2) Type II CardBus slots or (1) type III.
- IBM ThinkPad 310ED — The last model in the series also available late 1997, it was basically the same as the 310E, with the only difference of a CD-ROM drive and only offering a 12.1" 800x600 DSTN display option. The 310ED introduced the additional option to come standard with 32 MB of ram.

=== Comparison ===
Note - the "D" in the model number signifies the machine had the updated chassis with provision for fitment of a CD-ROM drive, or when using an adapter plate, an internal floppy disk drive. The models without the "D" didn't officially come with the updated chassis. For more detailed specifications and most model versions: https://psref.lenovo.com/syspool/Sys/PDF/withdrawnbook/twbook.pdf
| Model | Introduction Date | Withdrawal Date | Base Price | Display Options | | Resolution | CPU | Memory | Video Controller | Audio Controller | Hard Drive Options | | | Misc Info |
| Model | Introduction Date | Withdrawal Date | Base Price | DSTN | TFT | Resolution | CPU | Memory | Video Controller | Audio Controller | Hard Drive Options | | | Misc Info |
|---|---|---|---|---|---|---|---|---|---|---|---|---|---|---|
| 310 (EMEA) | Jun 1997 | Jan 1998 | ? | 11.3" Color | 11.3" Color | 640x480 800x600 | Pentium I - 133 MHz 66 MHz Bus 256 KB cache | 16-64 MB 60 ns EDO | CT65550 1 MB DRAM PCI 2.1 | Yamaha YMF715 | 1.08GB | 2.1GB | | 1.44 MB FDD NiHM Battery - 2.5 hr |
| 310D (EMEA) | Jun 1997 | Jan 1998 | ? | 12.1" Color | 12.1" Color | 640x480 800x600 | Pentium I - 133 MHz 66 MHz Bus 256 KB cache | 16-64 MB 60 ns EDO | CT65550 1 MB DRAM PCI 2.1 | Yamaha YMF715 | 1.08GB | 2.1GB | | Ext. 1.44 MB FDD 10x CD-ROM NiHM Battery - 2.5 hr |
| 310E (EMEA) | Nov 1997 | Jul 1998 | ? | 12.1" Color | 11.3" Color | 640x480 800x600 | Pentium I - 133 or 150 MHz MMX 66 MHz bus 256 KB cache | 16-64 MB 60 ns EDO | CT65550 1 MB DRAM PCI 2.1 | Yamaha YMF715 | 1.6GB | 2.1GB | 3.2GB | 1.44 MB FDD NiHM Battery - 3 hr |
| 310ED (EMEA) | Nov 1997 | Jul 1998 | ? | 12.1" Color | - | 640x480 800x600 | Pentium I - 133 or 150 MHz MMX 66 MHz bus 256 KB cache | 16-64 MB 60 ns EDO | CT65550 1 MB DRAM PCI 2.1 | Yamaha YMF715 | 1.6GB | 2.1GB | 3.2GB | Ext. 1.44 MB FDD 10x CD-ROM NiHM Battery - 3 hr |
| 310E (EMEA) (Spring 1998) | Mar 1998 | Sep 1998 | ? | 12.1" Color | 12.1" Color | 640x480 800x600 | Pentium I - 166 MHz MMX 66 MHz bus 256 KB cache | 16-64 MB 60 ns EDO | CT65550 1 MB DRAM PCI 2.1 | Yamaha YMF715 | 2.1GB | 3.2GB | | 1.44 MB FDD NiHM Battery - 3 hr |
| 310ED (EMEA) (Spring 1998) | Mar 1998 | Sep 1998 | ? | 12.1" Color | - | 640x480 800x600 | Pentium I - 166 MHz MMX 66 MHz bus 256 KB cache | 16-64 MB 60 ns EDO | CT65550 1 MB DRAM PCI 2.1 | Yamaha YMF715 | 2.1GB | 3.2GB | | Ext. 1.44 MB FDD 20-8x CD-ROM NiHM Battery - 3 hr |
| 310ED (Retail) | Nov 1997 | Sep 1998 | ? | 12.1" Color | - | 640x480 800x600 | Pentium I - 133 or 166 MHz MMX 66 MHz bus 256 KB cache | 16-64 MB 60 ns EDO | CT65550 1 MB DRAM PCI 2.1 | Yamaha YMF715 | 1.6GB | 2.1GB | 3.2GB | Ext. 1.44 MB FDD 10x or 20-8x CD-ROM NiHM Battery - 3 hr |
