= Diversified Technology =

Diversified Technology, Inc.

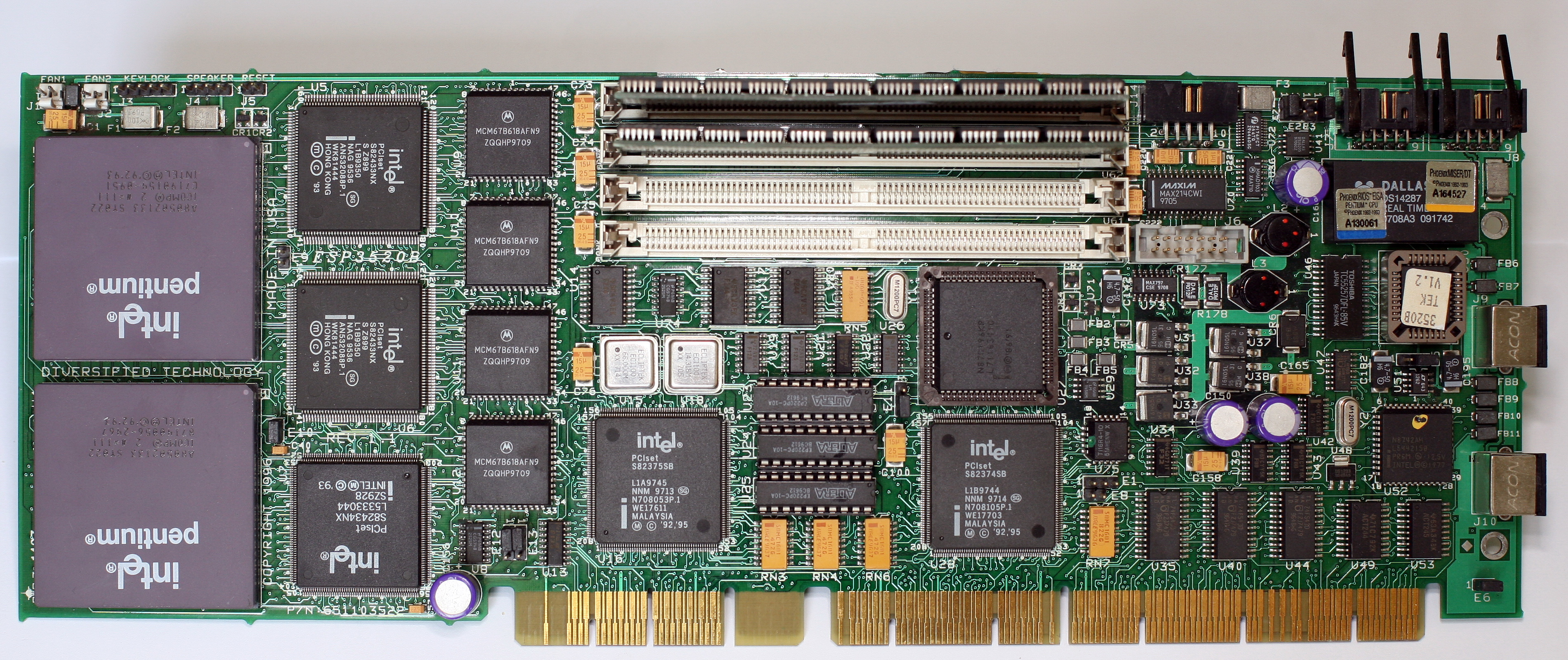
- A dual-Pentium (P54CS) single-board computer by Diversified Technology
- Company type: Private
- Industry: Computer
- Founded: 1971
- Headquarters: Ridgeland, Mississippi
- Website: diversifiedtechnology.com at the Wayback Machine (archived 2007-04-18)

Diversified Technology, Inc. was a computer hardware manufacturing company. Based in Ridgeland, Mississippi, the company, which was a subsidiary of Ergon, Inc., was formed in 1971. In 1987, Diversified Technology released the first IBM-compatible single-board computer for a passive ISA backplane. Diversified was also the first to introduce an ATCA- and InfiniBand-based blade network switch, introduced in Intel Xeon and AMD Opteron variants in 2005 and 2007 respectively.

Diversified Technology ceased operations in 2013.
