= ThinkPad 700 =

Laptop computer by IBM

Thinkpad 700
- Manufacturer: IBM
- Type: Notebook computer
- Released: October 5, 1992; 33 years ago
- Introductory price: 700: US$2,750 (equivalent to $6,300 in 2025); 700C: US$4,350 (equivalent to $10,000 in 2025); 700T: US$4,795 (equivalent to $11,000 in 2025)
- Operating system: PC DOS 5.0; PenPoint; IBM OS/2 2.0; Windows 3.1x
- CPU: Intel 80386SX @ 20 MHz (700T); IBM 486SLC @ 25 MHz (700/700C); IBM 486SLC2 @ 50 MHz (option for 700/700C)
- Memory: 4-16 MB
- Graphics: Western Digital WD90C26
- Weight: Up to 7.6 lb (3.4 kg)
- Successor: IBM ThinkPad 720
- Made in: United States: Research Triangle Park, North Carolina (RTP Plant); Japan: Fujisawa, Kanagawa (Fujisawa Plant); United Kingdom: Greenock, Scotland (Greenock Plant)

The IBM ThinkPad 700 (also named model 700 PS/2) is the first notebook computer for the ThinkPad brand that was released by IBM on October 5, 1992. Another series was released alongside it, the ThinkPad 300 series. The 300 series was meant to be a cheaper, lower performance model line over the 700. It was developed as a successor to the L40SX.

The ThinkPad 700 is the first laptop model ever with a pointing stick to control the cursor, under the IBM brand name of TrackPoint.

It was generally received positively by reviewers, although it had a high price and shorter battery life.

== History ==
External videos
- The ThinkPad That Started It All 700c (1992) on YouTube (75 seconds)

Because of design issues with the L40SX, the next iteration of IBM laptops were going to involve industrial designer Richard Sapper. Richard designed the ThinkPad 700, being inspired from a rectangular cigar box, and kept it simplistic.

Before the announcement of the 700 series, it has been speculated that the 700 and 700T would be manufactured by AST Research, Inc.

The first IBM ThinkPads, the 700 and 700C, were launched on October 5, 1992, alongside the 300 series.

The IBM 2521 (IBM 700T) was announced on April 17, 1992 and launched in July 1993. It was marketed as a data entry tablet for hospitals, health care providers, and field operation workers.

The ThinkPad 700C uses a color screen made by the joint venture Display Technologies, Inc. It was the largest active matrix display in a laptop when it was released.

President George H. W. Bush wanted to buy a ThinkPad 700C as a Christmas present for his wife Barbara Bush when it was released. It was sold out, so he called then IBM CEO John Akers. Akers reached out to the general manager of IBM's PC division, Jim Cannavino, who took the next ThinkPad from the assembly line and shipped it to the White House.

== Features and models ==
Both the 700 and 700C were based on the 25MHz IBM 486SLC processor with 4 MB of memory, and had a nickel–metal hydride battery that was claimed by IBM to last almost 4 hours. The 700 had the option of an 80 or 120 MB hard disk size, and a 9.5" 640 × 480 monochrome screen. The 700C had a standard 120 MB hard disk size, and 4, 8 or 16 MB memory options. It also had a 10.4" 640 × 480 active-matrix color screen. Both the 700 and 700C came with PC DOS 5.02 and Prodigy, an internet service. Other features both included were a modem, serial, VGA, and parallel ports, port replicator, docking station connector, and built in 3 1/2" 1.44 MB floppy disk drive.

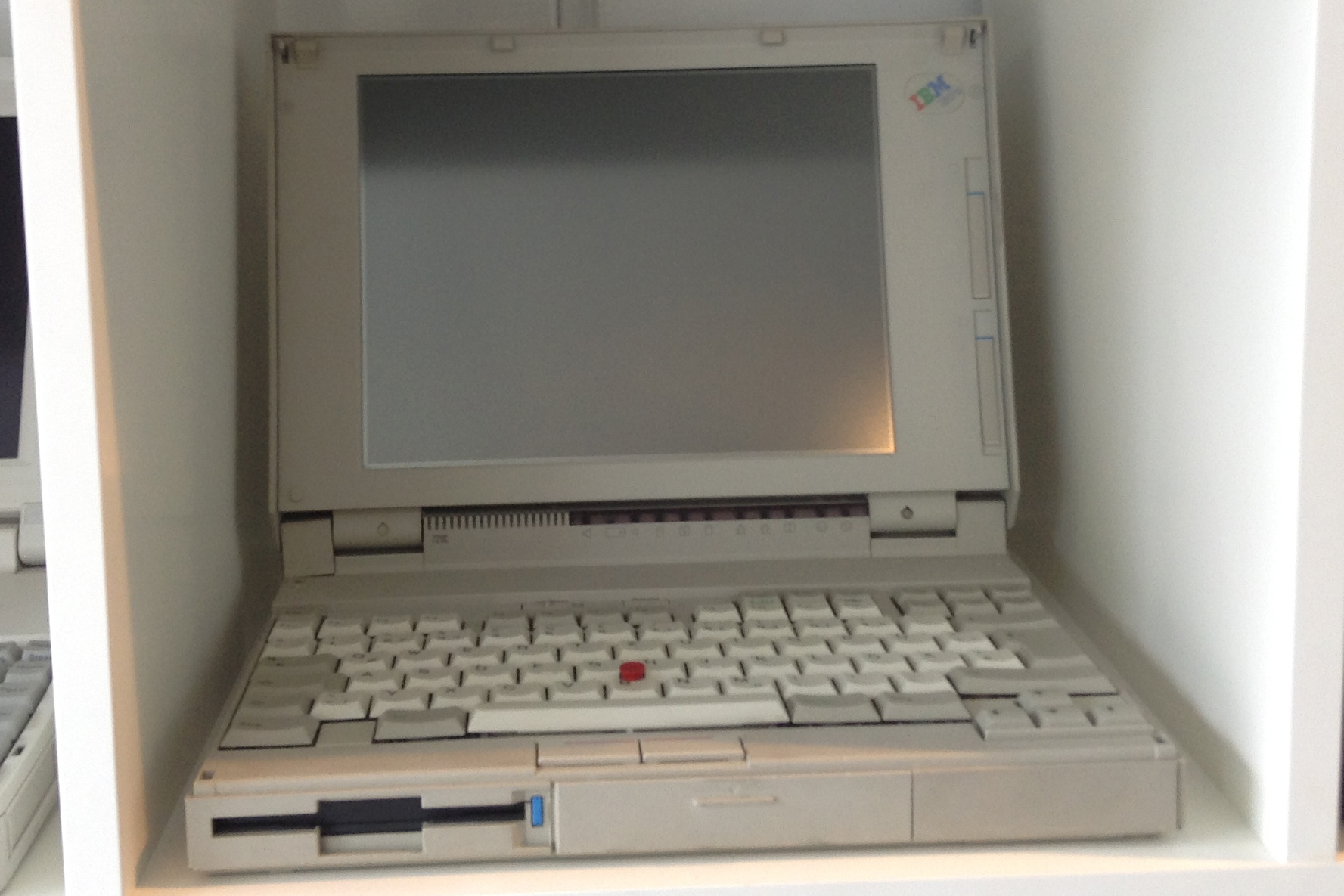
An IBM ThinkPad 720C in "IBM-Beige" color

Both the 700 and 700C came in a standard black color, but a less-known "IBM-Beige" color was available. Additionally, later on a 50MHz processor upgrade was offered by IBM for the 700 and 700C, giving it better performance.

The 700T was a portable pen-operated tablet that had a 20MHz Intel 386SX, 4 or 8 MB of memory, a 10 in 640 × 480 monochrome screen, and also very uncommon for its time, had a 20 MB solid state drive instead of a hard drive for storage. The 700T used an operating system created by Go Corporation known as PenPoint OS. Other features of the 700T had been a built-in 2.4 KB/s modem, a serial, parallel, external floppy drive, and keyboard connector.

The 700 was the base model, being considerably cheaper than the premium 700C at $2,750 vs $4,350 for the 700C. The 700T was renamed from IBM 2521 so that it was a name fit with the 700 and 700C.

	700 (Note: Even though the 700 and 700C notebooks are part of the ThinkPad series, they were labeled as 700 PS/2 and 700C PS/2.)	700C	700T
Display	9.5" 640x480 Monochrome STN	10.4" 640x480 Color TFT	10" 640x480 Monochrome STN
Storage	80 or 120 MB HDD	120 MB HDD	20 MB SSD
CPU	IBM 486SLC @ 25 MHz		Intel 80386SX @ 20 MHz
Memory (RAM)	4-16 MB		4-8 MB
Video Controller	WD90C26		
Audio Controller	None		
Operating System	PC DOS 5.0, PenPoint, IBM OS/2 2.0, Windows 3.1x		

== Reception ==
The 700 and 700C were given good reception, being called "the finest notebooks on the market" by PC Magazine which also complimented its design by saying "After years of undistinguished portables, IBM has finally got it right" and a review by BYTE Magazine said "The IBM ThinkPad 700C notebook wins the award for the most innovative design". PC Computing gave its annual "most valuable product" to the ThinkPad 700C, describing it as "a clear standout by its combination of speed, beauty, hard-nosed practicality, and, yes, grace".

The 700C was given an 8.0 rating in a review by InfoWorld, and many of the praise went to the 700C's active matrix color display which was said to have rich, bright colors and crisp text, and was bigger and better than competitors. The keyboard was also given good reviews, saying it is solid feeling and has quick responsiveness.

A 700C review from Computerworld noted that the implementation of the Advanced Power Management 1.0 specification by Microsoft resulted in a long battery life.

The only cons given about the 700 series by some reviews was the increased weight and size, along with the more expensive price tag and lower battery life.

== See also ==
- History of tablet computers § Early tablets

== Notes ==
Preceded by IBM PS/2 Note; IBM PS/2 CL57SX	IBM ThinkPad 700	Succeeded by ThinkPad 720
