= IBM PS/2 Model L40 SX =

1991 IBM laptop

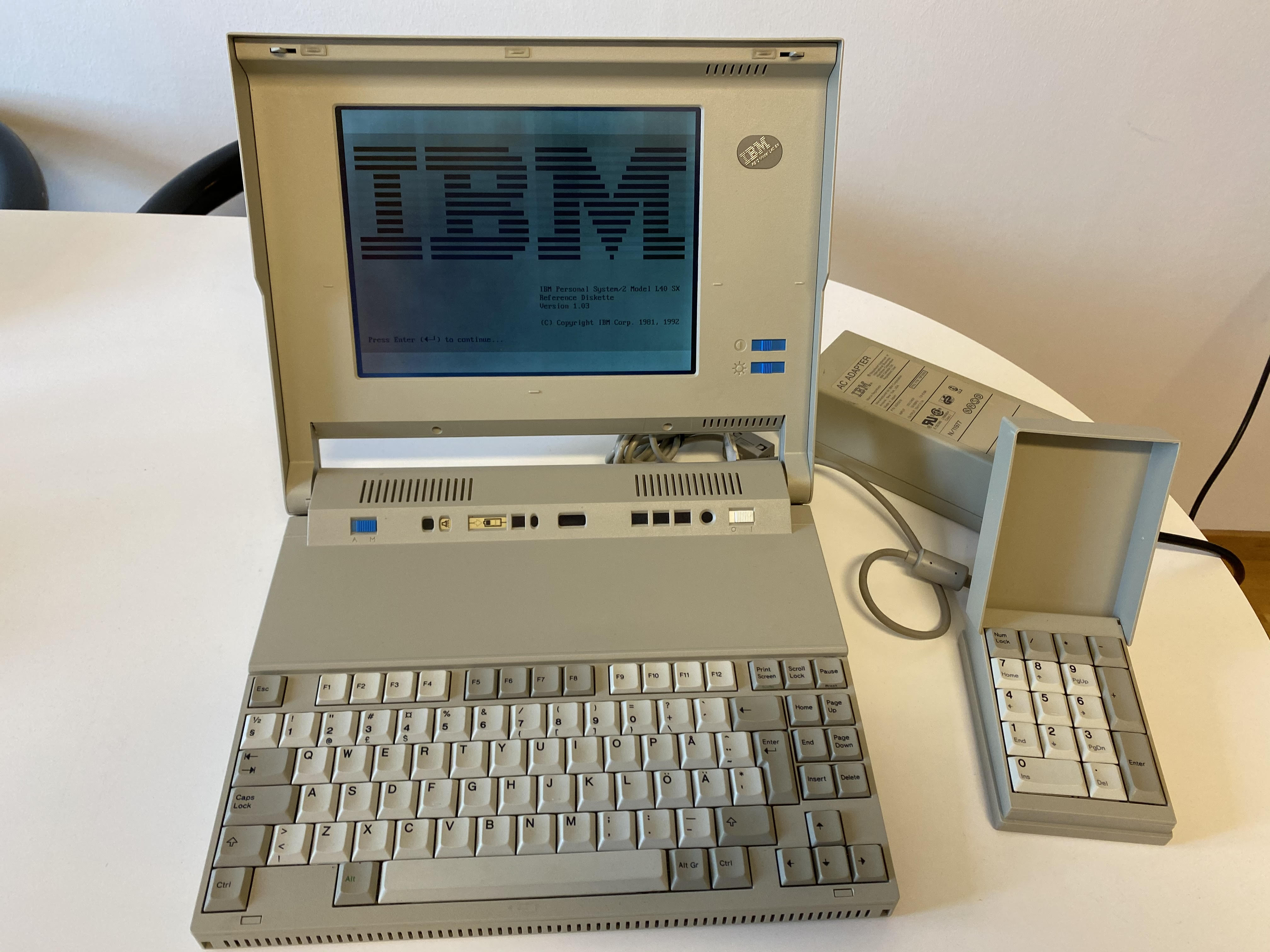
- Also known as: Type 8543
- Manufacturer: IBM
- Product family: IBM PS/2
- Type: Laptop
- Released: March 26, 1991; 35 years ago
- Introductory price: US$5,995 (equivalent to $13,750 in 2025)
- Discontinued: February 1993
- Units sold: 150,000+
- Operating system: DOS, Windows 3.0, OS/2
- CPU: Intel 80386SX @ 20 MHz (optional Intel 80387SX math co-processor)
- Memory: 2 to 18 MB (two expansion slots)
- Storage: 60 MB hard drive 3.5" 1.44 MB floppy drive
- Display: 10" monochrome STN LCD
- Graphics: VGA (640x480)
- Connectivity: parallel port, serial port
- Power: Battery: Ni-Cd
- Weight: 3.49 kg (7.7 lb)
- Predecessor: IBM PC Convertible
- Successor: IBM PS/2 CL57 SX

The IBM Personal System/2 Model L40 SX (stylized as PS/2 Model L40 SX) is a laptop made by IBM as part of the IBM PS/2 series. It was the successor to the IBM PC Convertible. The "SX" in the name refers to its CPU, the Intel 80386SX.

== Development ==
By 1989 IBM had been unsuccessful in the laptop computer market. InfoWorld wrote that the company's first laptop, the PC Convertible, was "a dismal failure" because of high price and inferior technology. After the more successful PS/2 P70 luggable, IBM stated that year its intention to release an Intel 80386-based laptop with "a battery that doesn't have to be recharged every half hour".

The L40 SX was designed and manufactured over the course of thirteen months between 1990 and 1991. By 1990, IBM were already late to the market of 386SX-powered laptops. Faced with releasing an obsolete product, should they have followed their normal two-year lead time, IBM hastened development of the L40 SX.

The L40 SX's case and keyboard assemblies took roughly five months to produce and involved novel methods to achieve this time frame. IBM hired their former subsidiary Lexmark of Lexington, Kentucky, and Leap Technologies of Otsego, Michigan, to achieve this production. Both companies used IBM's own Catia CAD–CAM system to design the models of the parts for the aforementioned assemblies. Lexmark were responsible for drafting these models, sending them electronically to Leap for revisions. Once revised, Leap used these models to machine the injection molds for each part. The two companies' electronic exchange of models was novel for the time and accelerated production by eliminating the need for mocking up and prototyping. It also posed a risk, however, as any design flaws realized after manufacturing would set production back up to a year and compel IBM to cancel the laptop. Because of this, both Leap and Lexmark used specialized software to predict how the parts would result from Leap's molds.

Before designing began, however, Leap and Lexmark had to source suitable plastic. They settled on a polycarbonate–ABS polyblend by Dow Chemical that was durable, colorable, and plateable. The latter quality was necessary for compliance with the FCC's regulations on electromagnetic interference. Integrated circuits, such as microprocessors, cause such interference; most companies at the time compensated by spraying a thick layer of metallic paint on their cases' interiors. Because the 386SX's power overrode such shielding, however, IBM turned to electroless plating—a method that was novel for laptops. This provided the case with stronger shielding and not much more weight but also considerable expense for IBM. Research on the method was also costly: as electroless plating had seldom been used on their polyblends, Dow had to perform rigorous laboratory tests. After designing ended and the molds were machined, Leap performed injection only on the molds for the case assembly parts, shipping the molds for the keyboard assembly parts to Lexmark. Leap performed ultrasonic welding on their parts where necessary and handed the responsibility of plating to a company in Michigan. Leap then sent the completed case assemblies to Lexmark.

Toshiba of Japan provided IBM with the L40 SX's liquid-crystal display, which was a 10-inch, sidelit, passive-matrix panel. Final assembly of these panels were performed in Raleigh, North Carolina. IBM considered using Toshiba's active-matrix LCD which provided a better response times, wider viewing angles, and no blotching, but these displays drew too much power. IBM also teamed with Western Digital of Irvine to design the L40 SX's motherboard. Western Digital provided assembly of the L40 SX's entire motherboard as well as their 7600LP series of video and hard disk drive controller chipsets, as well as the means for IBM to assemble the motherboard themselves further down the line.

Manufacture of the L40 SX was plagued with parts shortages, but IBM were able to produce roughly 4,000 pre-release units which were sold to select members of the public (including 880 members of Harvard Business School's Class of 1992). Hard disk drives were the latest shortage in April 1991, with IBM having to look at producing its own 2.5-inch 60 MB drives instead of waiting for Conner Peripherals.

The substantial price raise of the L40 SX in March 1991 drew criticism from potential buyers who had enthusiastically praised it at IBM's last press briefing. IBM justified this price raise by classifying the L40 SX as a desktop replacement. The L40 SX's larger-than-notebook dimensions was advantageous for IBM in both raising its technical capability, fitting its coveted full-sized keyboard, and meeting the expectations of buyers specifically looking for a desktop replacement machine. Potential buyers felt the L40 SX's exceptionally comfortable keyboard and low power consumption failed to justify its launch price, however. At the time of the company's announcement of their price raise for the L40 SX, IBM were evaluating demand for a low-priced notebook computer in the United States after releasing the PS/55 Note in Japan.

At the time, the L40 SX differed from most other laptops in operation by offering a suspend mode, a dynamic CPU clock cycle that slows down when the processor is idle, and the use of LCDs for status indicators, as opposed to LEDs. The latter two features lower the L40 SX's power draw. The back of the L40 SX sports one serial port, one parallel port, an external AT expansion port, a VGA port, and a PS/2 mouse port. IBM provided an optional modem that can receive fax transmissions.

== Specifications ==
- CPU: 20 MHz Intel 386SX
- Screen: Toshiba LRS1751-R1AE / LS035OLG 10" monochrome VGA (640x480)
- OS: DOS 3.3 or 4.0, Windows 3.0, OS/2 1.31
- Disk: 2.5" IDE hard drive
- Bus: ISA

== Optional peripherals ==
- Trackpoint (Trackball/Mouse convertible)
  - IBM PS/2 L40SX "Convertible" Pointing Device, YouTube video
- Quick Charger
- Car Battery Adapter
- Internal Data Fax Modem
- Deluxe Carrying Case

== Recall ==
The Wall Street Journal reported that IBM had received 15 complaints of a short circuit occurring between the circuitry and a conductive coating inside the case which, in some instances, has melted a small hole in the case. The short occurs when the laptop is run on batteries, and IBM reported it will install a fuse to stop overheating. They had to issue a recall for 150,000 machines.

== Successors ==
One year after the announcement of the L40 SX, on 24 March 1992, three notebooks and a laptop were announced by IBM: N51SX, N51SCL, N45SL as part of the IBM PS/2 Note series and the CL57SX. The CL57SX was the first laptop from IBM that featured a color TFT display.

Preceded by IBM PC Convertible	IBM PS/2 L40SX	Succeeded by IBM PS/2 CL57SX
