= ThinkPad 350 =

IBM Thinkpad 350

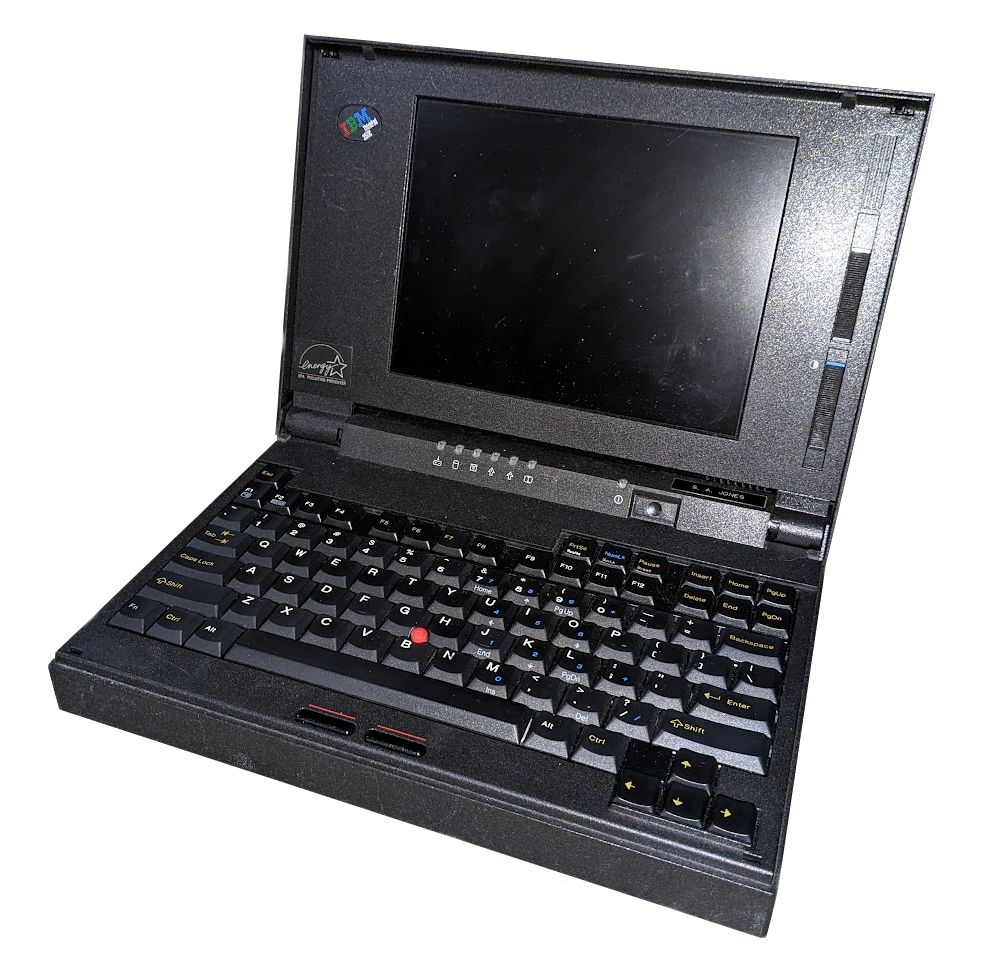
- An IBM ThinkPad 350 sitting open.
- Manufacturer: IBM
- Type: Notebook Computer
- Released: June 1993; 33 years ago
- Lifespan: 1993-1994
- Introductory price: Starting at US$2,099 (equivalent to $4,678 in 2025)
- Discontinued: September 1994
- Media: Floppy Disk
- Operating system: MS-DOS 5.0
- CPU: 80486SL @ 25 MHz
- Memory: 4-20 MB
- Storage: 125 - 250 MB internal hard drive
- Display: Types: 9.5in DSTN 640x480 Mono; 9.2in DSTN 640x480 Color
- Graphics: Chips & Tech. - 65530
- Input: Built-in Keyboard; TrackPoint; 1 x VGA port; 1 x Serial port; 1 x Parallel port; 1 x PS/2 port; 1 x RJ port
- Connectivity: Built-in modem; LAN Adaptor (via PCMCIA card)
- Weight: Up to 5.7lb
- Predecessor: IBM ThinkPad 300
- Successor: IBM ThinkPad 360
- Website: www.ibm.com

The IBM Thinkpad 350 series was a notebook computer series introduced in 1993 by IBM as part of their Thinkpad laptop series. It was the successor to the IBM ThinkPad 300. With only 2 models ever made in the series, it was succeeded in 1994 by the IBM Thinkpad 360 series.

== History ==
The 350 was announced in June 1993. The 125MB disk version started shipping in June 1993, the 250MB version started shipping in July.

The New York Times noted that IBM challenged Compaq with the development of the 350, who was the market leader in the lower priced notebook market.

== Features ==
The 350 series shipped with IBM PC DOS 5.02 as the included operating system.

Both models in the series came with an Intel 486SL running at 25 MHz, and a CT-65530 video controller with 1 MB of video memory. Both models also had a standard 4 MB of RAM that was on a proprietary IC DRAM Card. If a user wanted to upgrade the ram, the 350 ThinkPads supported an IC DRAM Card size up to 20 MB.

Both in the series came with a 125 or 250 MB standard hard drive, and a non-removable 1.44 MB floppy drive. Both models also had a battery life up to 9 hours.

In March 1994, IBM cut the prices by 12%.

The 350 is identical to the PS/Note 425 and the 350C is identical to the PS/Note 425C.

== Models ==
IBM ThinkPad 350 — The first model in the series, it introduced a Intel 486SL running at 25 MHz, a monochrome 9.5" STN display with 640x480 resolution, 4 MB of ram on an IC DRAM Card, a non-removable 3.5" 1.44 MB floppy drive and a 250 MB hard disk drive. The 350 weighed 5.2 lb in total, and started at $2,099. Other features included: Trackpoint II, Type II PCMIA slot.

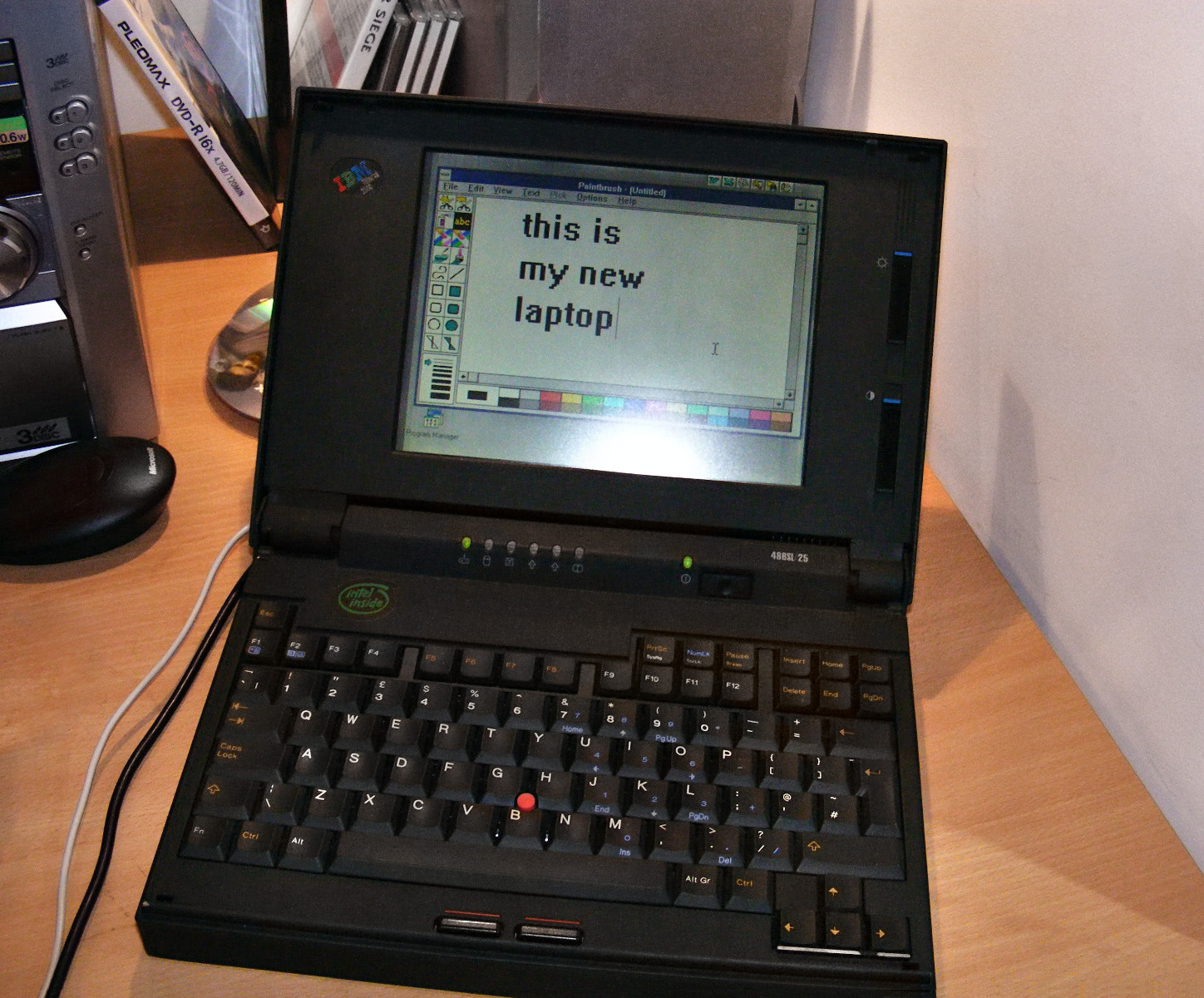
IBM ThinkPad 350C, also branded as PS/Note 425

IBM ThinkPad 350C — Basically the same as the first, and also the second and last in the series, it only had 1 notable change to a 9.2" STL LCD 640x480 256 color display. It also added the additional option of a 125 MB hard drive alongside the 250 MB option. It weighed 5.7 lbs, a .5 lb gain from the base 350 model. The 350C started at a price of $1,999 with the highest being $2,399.

=== Comparison ===
Model	350	350C
Intro/Disc Date	Jun 1993 / Sep 1994	
Display	VGA / 9.5in DSTN 640x480 64 Greyscale	VGA / 9.5in DSTN 640x480 256 Color
Video Controller	Chips & Tech. CT-65530	
Audio Controller	None	
Processor	Intel 80486SL - 25 MHz, 8 KB Cache	
Memory	4-20 MB, 80 ns, non-parity	
Hard Drive	125 MB, 15 ms	250 MB, 12 ms
Misc	1.44 MB FDD TrackPoint II NiMH Battery / 2.7 hours	1.44 MB FDD TrackPoint II NiMH Battery / 2 hours

== Reception ==
A review by the Los Angeles Times considered the ThinkPad 350 not an impressive machine due the fact it was bundling IBM DOS instead of MS-DOS or Microsoft Windows. A review of the 350C by InfoWorld noted the good screen and the relatively short battery life.

Preceded by IBM ThinkPad 300	IBM ThinkPad 350	Succeeded by IBM ThinkPad 360
