= IBM PS/55 Note =

Series of notebook computers released in Japan

- Manufacturer: IBM
- Product family: IBM PS/55
- Released: 1991; 35 years ago
- Introductory price: between $1,680 and $2,550
- Predecessor: IBM PC Convertible

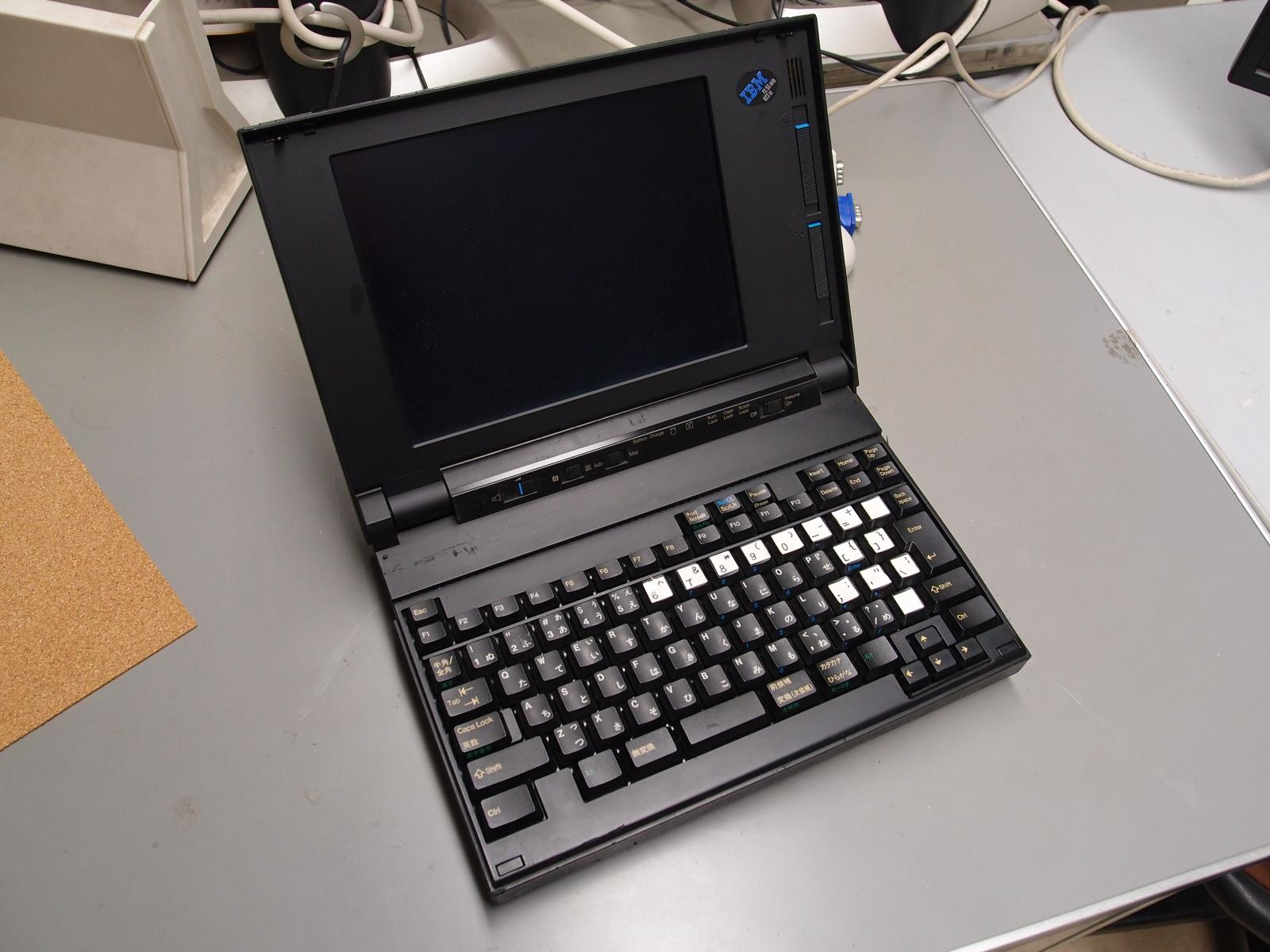
Model N23SX (5523-S)

The IBM Personal System/55 Note (stylized as PS/55 note) is a series of notebooks manufactured by the IBM subsidiary IBM Japan as part of the IBM Personal System/55 series.

Machine type 5523 were designated as 'notebook' computers distinct from type 5535 which were larger 'laptop' multistation computers.

The international IBM PS/2 Note series was based on the PS/55 Note series and used the ISA bus (with the final exception of the C52).

== History ==
IBM started selling the PS/55 Note series in Japan in April 1991.

Western Digital has supplied video and logic chips for the PS/55 Note.

The second generation notes had an N model number signifying 'Notebook'. The third and fourth generation notes changed to C for 'Colour' and M for 'Monochrome'.

== Models ==
The prices for the PS/55 Note varies between $1,680 and $2,550.

- Model 'note' (5523-S0x) was the first release with a 12Mhz 80386 CPU.
- Model N23/N33 SX (5523-SCx) (03/1991) was the second generation note with 16Mhz 80386 CPU.
- Models M23V and C23V (10/1992) joint-third-generation and first TFT option note, but without a Trackpoint.
- Model C52 (10/1992) was a fourth and final generation note identical to the ThinkPad 700C with MCA bus.
- Model T22sx (1992) was an offshoot machine with detachable tablet and keyboard machine.
- Model N27sx (02/1992) was not a notebook and forerunner of the PS/2 CL57SX model.

== Reception ==
The PS/55 Note was a rapid success in Japan.
