= ThinkPad 365 =

Notebook computer series by IBM

Thinkpad 365

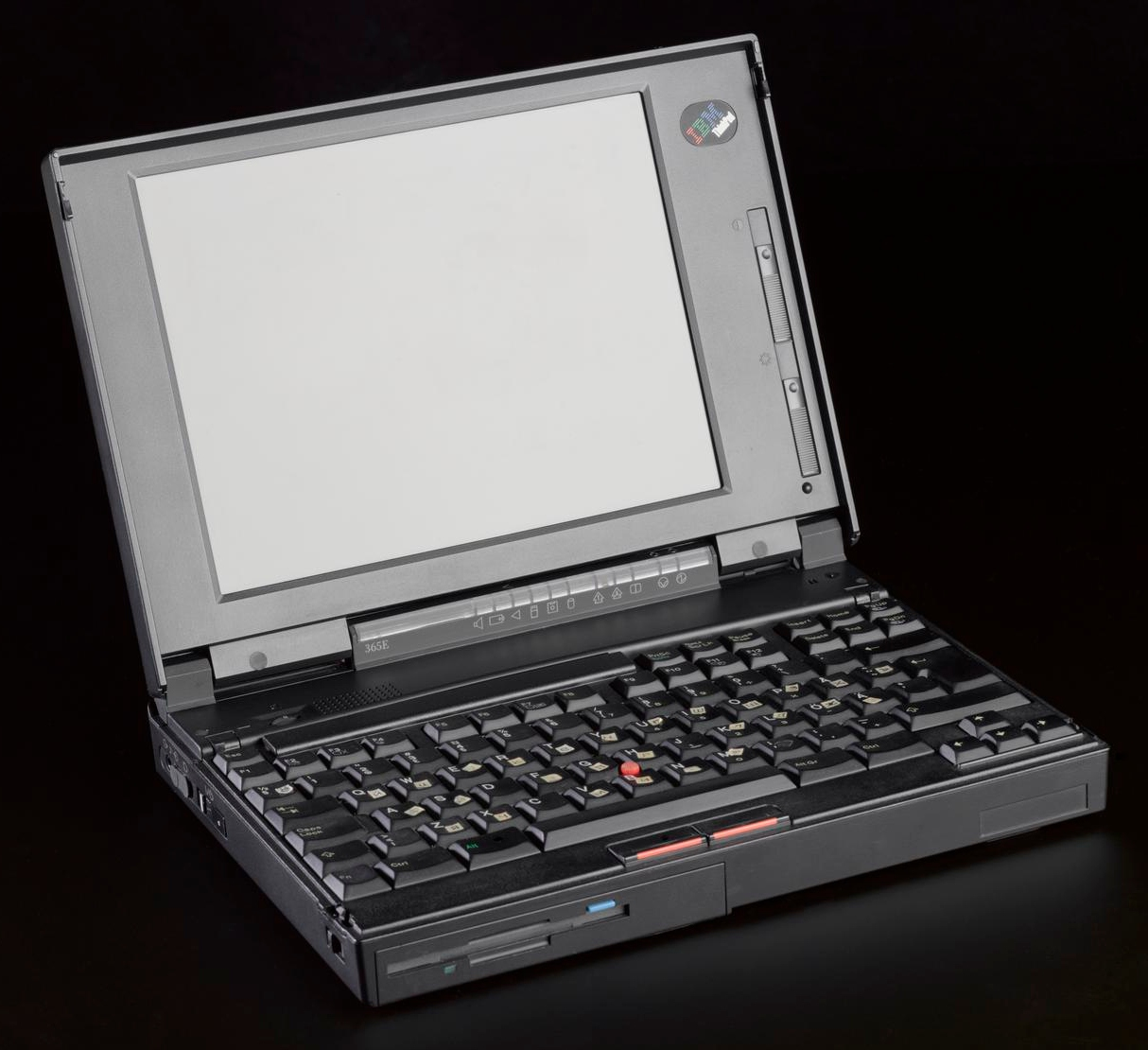
- IBM ThinkPad 365e
- Also known as: Clark (codename)
- Developer: IBM
- Manufacturer: ASE Group
- Type: Notebook computer
- Released: NA: November 7, 1995
- Lifespan: 1995-1997
- Introductory price: Starting at US$1,999 (equivalent to $4,224 in 2025)
- Discontinued: October 1997
- Media: Floppy Disk, CD
- Operating system: IBM DOS 7.0; OS/2 Warp 3.0; Windows 3.11; Windows 95
- CPU: C/CS/CD/CSD: Cyrix 486 @ 75 MHz; E/ED: Cx5x86 @ 100 MHz; X/XD: Pentium I @ 120–133 MHz
- Memory: C/CS/CD/CSD/E/ED: 8-24 MB FP Mode SO-DIMM; X/XD: 8-40 MB EDO SO-DIMM
- Storage: 340 MB - 1.35 GB internal hard drive
- Display: C/CS/CD/CSD/E/ED: 10.4" 640x480 DSTN or TFT; X/XD: 10.4" DSTN or TFT; 11.3" DSTN or TFT; 640x480 or 800x600
- Graphics: C/CS/CD/CSD/E/ED: Chips & Tech - 65545; X/XD: Trident-Cyber9320
- Input: Built-in Keyboard; TrackPoint; 1 x VGA port; 1 x Serial port; 1 x Parallel port; 1 x PS/2 port; 1 x 3.5 mm audio in, out, mic in; 1 x MIDI / Joystick port
- Connectivity: LAN Adapter (via PCMCIA card)
- Weight: Up to 6.5lb
- Predecessor: IBM ThinkPad 360
- Successor: IBM ThinkPad 380
- Made in: Taiwan
- Website: pc.ibm.com at the Wayback Machine (archived 1996-11-21)

The IBM ThinkPad 365 is a notebook computer series developed by IBM and manufactured by ASE Group. It was released in North America in November 1995, and was the successor of the ThinkPad 360 series. The series had eight models that were released before being discontinued, and was succeeded in 1997 by the ThinkPad 380 series.

== History ==
=== Introduction ===
Originally the price of the 365 series was expected to start at $2,300 earlier in 1996, but some changes were made to make the series more cost competitive in the market. IBM's main notebook competitor at the time was Toshiba, which offered notebooks such as the T1910 for $1,599. IBM earlier in the year had a 21% market share for portable computers while Toshiba had 27%. To make the 365 line cheaper, IBM partnered with Taiwanese manufacturer ASE Group to build the 365 series. Additionally IBM chose to go with a cheaper processor, choosing the Cyrix 486DX4 for the initial series offerings, as it was available for less than $100. It was originally believed earlier in the year that the series would use the Intel DX4, but this was not the case. However, Pentium P54C based systems would be made later, which would become the X/XD models. With the lower price and many configuration options available, IBM hoped to attract a wider audience.

On November 7, 1995, the 365 series was announced with the 365CS, C, CSD, and CD models. The base model 365CS had a $1,999 price tag and came with a 10.4" passive matrix (DSTN) display, 75 MHz DX4 processor, 8 MB of RAM, Sound-Blaster compatible audio, and a 540 MB hard disk drive. The 365C was the same as the CS except it had an active matrix (TFT) display, which offered better quality and it was available for $2,200. The 365CSD and CD offered a 2x speed CD-ROM drive and the CD had a TFT while the CSD had a DSTN display. The series was available from IBM directly, retailers, and stores.

IBM would also demonstrate the 365C/CD at the Fall Comdex show in November 1995 against many competitors. They had one of the largest exhibits at the event, showcasing other products such as the ThinkPad 760 line.

==== E/ED release ====
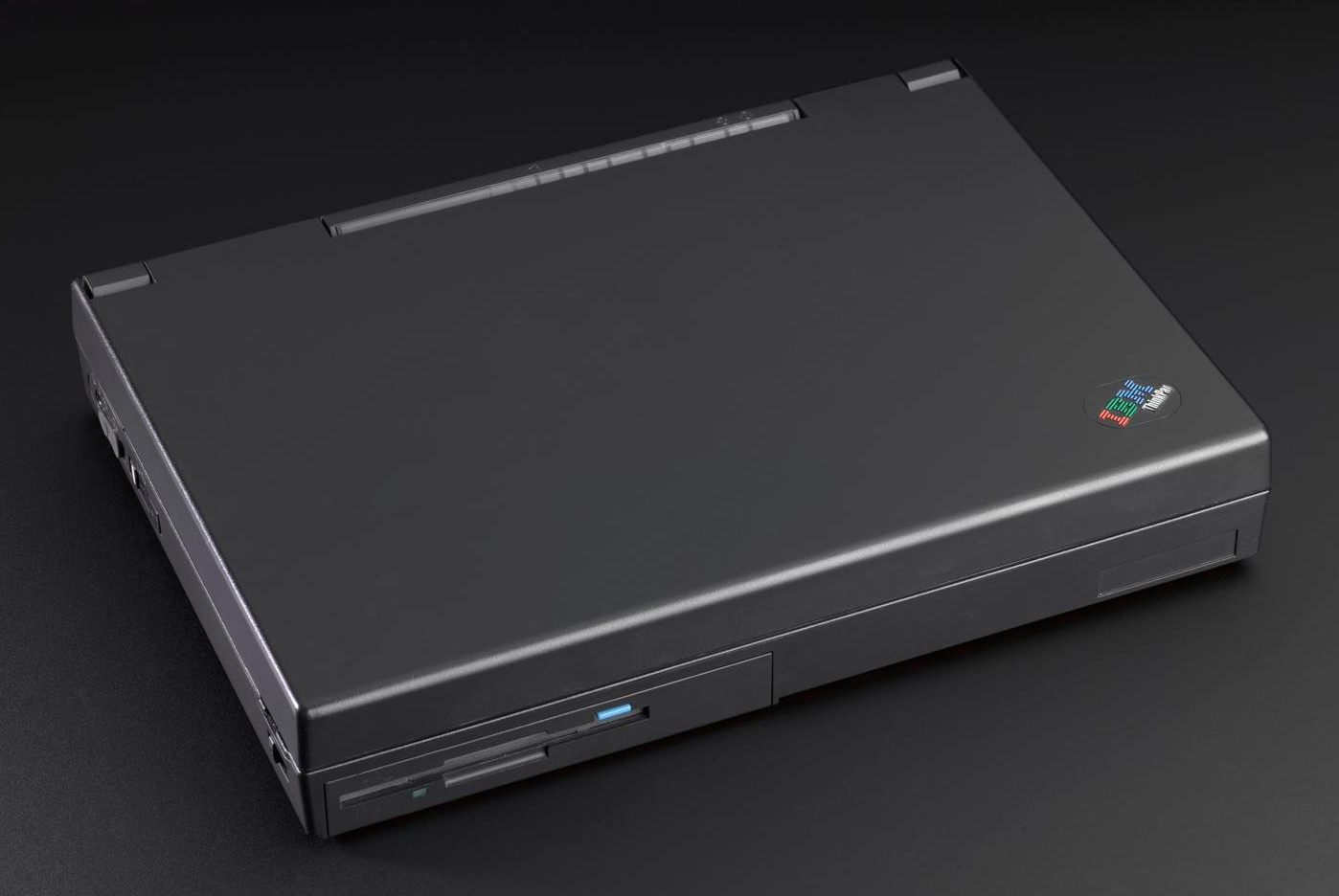
ThinkPad 365e, closed

In March 1996 the 365E/ED were announced. Both would be the same to the previous models but offer a 100 MHz Cyrix 5x86 processor and the ED would be equipped with a 4x speed CD-ROM drive. The release in the US was expected to be the following month in April, while the E/ED was already available in Europe and other countries. The E/ED were expected to be released May 10, 1996, and would be available for $1,999–2,499. After the release of the E/ED, the four original 486-based models were discontinued.

==== X/XD release ====
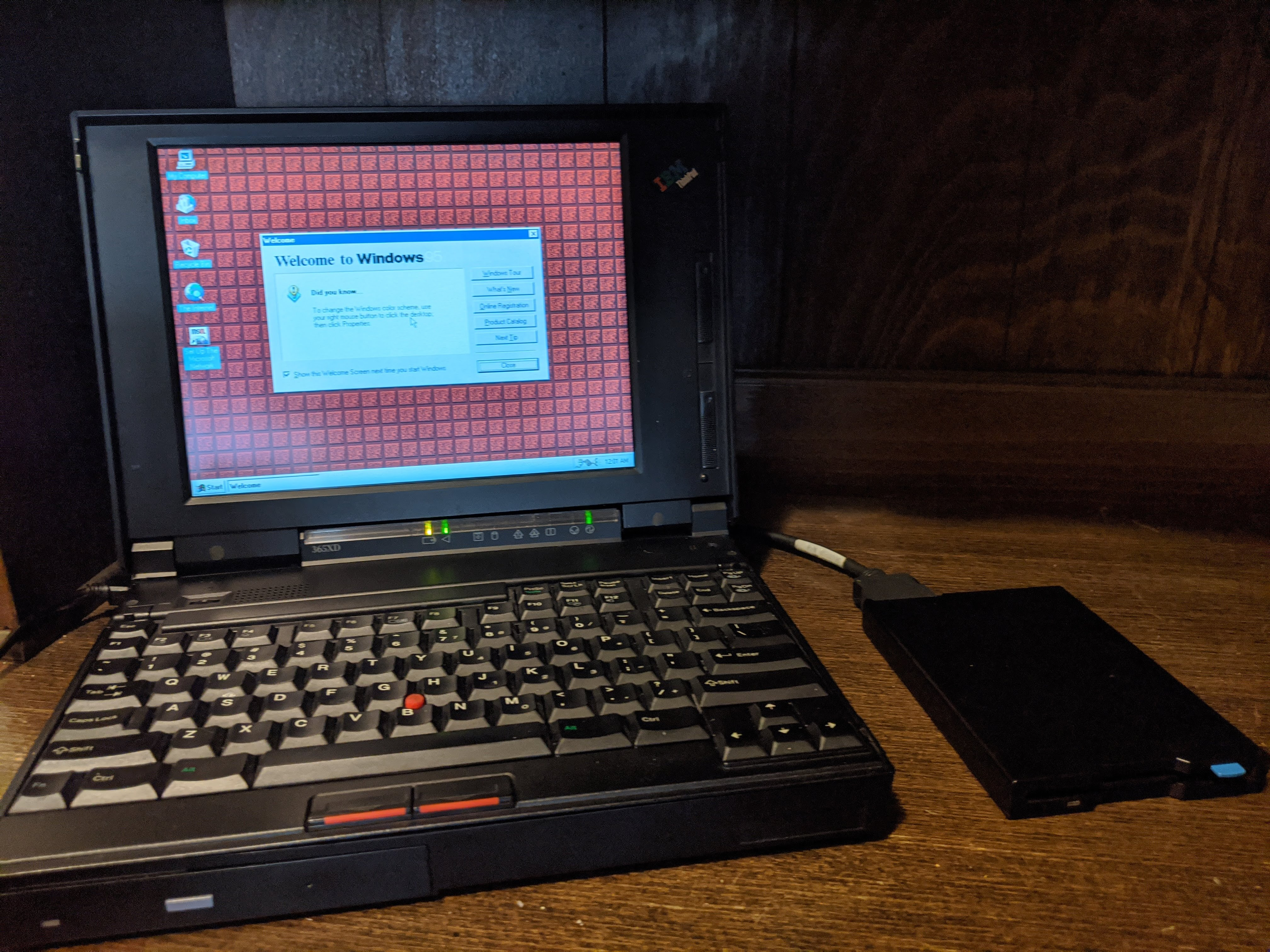
Thinkpad 365XD with an external floppy drive

Shortly after the E/ED announcement on April 23, 1996, IBM announced the X/XD models. Both would have a Pentium P54C 100 or 120 MHz processor, up to 1.08 GB hard disk drive, and EDO memory with a maximum capacity of 40 MB. The 365X would also be available with a bigger 11.3-inch DSTN display, and the 365XD would have a 4x CD-ROM drive. Availability was planned for May 31, 1996, with 11.3-inch DSTN models coming June 30, 1996. The 365X with a 10.4-inch TFT would cost $2,899 and the 365XD with a 10.4-inch DSTN would be $2,799 upon release.

=== Discontinuation ===
In February 1997, IBM started to reduce prices on 365 series ThinkPads due to the introduction of new 365 and 560 series notebooks that would be coming out the following month, and because Intel at this time cut OEM prices for their desktop and notebook processors.

Prices for the series dropped by up to $400, starting at $1,799 for a base model. A 365 model coming out next month with a 120 MHz Pentium I and 1 GB Hard Drive would cost less than $2,000.

In April 1997, IBM cut prices even more on their older ThinkPad models, including the 365 series. This was because of the introduction of new ThinkPad models, the 760XD and XL. A ThinkPad 365X with a 120 MHz Pentium I, 8 MB memory, 1 GB hard drive, and 10.4in TFT display cost $1,862 versus $4,734 for a 760EL with a 133 MHz Pentium I, 16 MB memory, 2.1 GB hard drive, and 12.1in TFT display.

=== Reception ===
Before the series was released in November 1995, Kimball Brown, an analyst from Dataquest research in San Jose, California, stated: "We expect it to be the major driver of growth in the notebook market in 1996 and beyond. The IBM ThinkPad brand has built an excellent reputation among high-end notebook users. Now, with the ThinkPad 365 line, IBM has an extremely credible offering that should be very popular among average business users."

In March 1996 a review by Computer Shopper of the 365CD stated "The screen is bright and sharp, and the system has built-in audio. Performance is not top-notch, but battery life is respectable. The ThinkPad 365 is well-designed and attractive." and praise was given for the easy accessibility of parts inside like previous models. In benchmark testing the 365CD scored a 16 on Winstone 96 and a 69 on CPUmark32, falling behind a Gateway Solo with 90 MHz Pentium which scored 25 and 163.

A June 1996 review by PC Computing Magazine editor Marty Jerome gave the 365CSD a 4 out of 5 star rating, meaning the product was perceived as "good". Praise was given to its low cost over competitors, but it was said to have "486 performance" and given negativity for having a non-removable 2x CD-ROM drive.

In November 1996 PC World ranked the 365E 2nd in their top 20 notebooks of the year. The keyboard was regarded as exceptional, battery life was "above-average", and the bundled Lotus SmartSuite 96 were pros given to it. The main negatives was the lack of wrist rest and sound, and the small capacity hard disk drive.

== Models and hardware ==
=== 365CS/C/CSD/CD ===
The original CS/C/CSD/CD all came with a Cyrix Cx486DX4 running at 75 MHz which had a integrated math co-processor and 8 KB of L1 cache. 8 MB of standard RAM was included, and was up-gradable to 24 MB maximum with a 72-pin SIMM. All models had a Chips & Technologies 65545 video controller, with the CS having 512 KB of DRAM and the other models having 1 MB. The CS/CSD had a 10.4" DSTN display that supported 256 colors, while the C/CD had a 10.4" TFT display that supported 262,144 colors, and both had 640x480 max resolution. A 340 MB or 540 MB hard disk drive was available depending on the model. The hard drive could also be easily upgraded, having a standard EIDE connector on the motherboard, rather than a proprietary connector the previous 360 series had. For the CS/C a 1.44 MB floppy disk drive was installed, and the CSD/CD had a 2x CD-ROM drive with an external floppy disk drive port.

For input a full-size ALPS switch keyboard with 8 function keys was standard along with a TrackPoint III pointing stick.

A wide range of ports/connectivity was available. All four models had two PCMCIA 2.1 slots, a port replicator connector, a serial, a parallel, VGA, and infrared port. Additionally the CSD/CD supported sound with a 3.5 mm in/out/microphone and midi port controlled by a ESS Technology ES1688 audio chip.

A lot of software was also available depending on the options selected. For the Operating System IBM DOS 7.0, Windows 3.11, Windows 95, or OS/2 Warp 3.0 could be preinstalled. Additional software that could be included was IBM PC Card Director 1.4, IBM ThinkPad Demo, Lotus suite, PRODIGY, Sofnet, Video for Windows, Puma TranXit, Compuserv, NetFinity, and various ThinkPad software like Diskette factory.

=== 365E/ED ===
The 365E/ED were slightly upgraded versions of the original four models with a Cyrix 5x86c 100 MHz processor with 16 KB of L1 cache. Other than this, the E/ED were the same to the previous models, with the ED only offering a 4x CD-ROM drive over the original 2X. The E also had no audio while the ED had the ES1688. Both had a 10.4-inch DSTN with 640×480 resolution. For the operating system Windows 95 was preinstalled along with NetFinity, CompuServ, Puma TranXit, and other utility software.

=== 365X/XD ===
The 365X/XD were released at the same time as the E/ED but had significant changes. The processor was switched to a Intel Pentium P54C running at a base speed of 100 MHz. RAM type was changed from fast page to EDO with a maximum size of 40 MB with a 144-pin SIMM. The bus was changed to PCI from VL, which offered more bandwidth. Hard drive size was increased from 540 MB up to 1.35 GB, and the BIOS was changed from a Phoenix BIOS to an IBM-made BIOS. The same 10.4-inch DSTN or TFT display was available or an 11.3-inch DSTN for the XD, and all supported 800x600 resolution with a Trident Cyber9320 video controller that has 1 MB of DRAM. Other than these changes, the X/XD were largely the same to the previous models.

Another version of the X/XD was released in the fall of 1996, with the only difference of a 120 to 133 MHz Pentium, a 11.3-inch TFT display option, and the XD had Windows 95 OSR2 as an additional operating system option.

If the user wanted to upgrade their hard drive past the maximum capacity option of 2.01 GB, the BIOS had a hard drive capacity limitation of 8.9 GB because of BIOS INT 13H.

=== Comparison ===
Model	Introduction date	Withdrawal date	Base price	Display options		Resolution options	CPU	Memory	Video controller	Audio controller	Hard drive Options				Misc info
Model	Introduction date	Withdrawal date	Base price	DSTN	TFT	Resolution options	CPU	Memory	Video controller	Audio controller	Hard drive Options				Misc info
365CS	Nov 1995	Jun 1996	$1,999	10.4"	-	640×480	486DX4 - 75 MHz 25 MHz bus 8 KB cache Coprocessor	8-24 MB 70 ns FP	CT65545 512 KB DRAM	None	340 MB		540 MB		1.44 MB FDD NiHM Battery - 3 hr
365C	Nov 1995	Jun 1996	$2,200	-	10.4"	640×480	486DX4 - 75 MHz 25 MHz bus 8 KB cache Coprocessor	8-24 MB 70 ns FP	CT65545 1 MB DRAM	None	340 MB		540 MB		1.44 MB FDD NiHM Battery - 3 hr
365CSD	Nov 1995	Jun 1996	$2,499	10.4"	-	640×480	486DX4 - 75 MHz 25 MHz bus 8 KB cache Coprocessor	8-24 MB 70 ns FP	CT65545 1 MB DRAM	ESS1688	540 MB				2X CD-ROM drive NiHM Battery - 2.5 hr
365CD	Nov 1995	Jun 1996	$3,199	-	10.4"	640×480	486DX4 - 75 MHz 25 MHz bus 8 KB cache Coprocessor	8-24 MB 70 ns FP	CT65545 1 MB DRAM	ESS1688	540 MB				2X CD-ROM drive NiHM Battery - 2.5 hr
365E	May 1996	Oct 1996	$1,799	10.4"	-	640×480	5x86c - 100 MHz 33 MHz bus 16 KB cache Coprocessor	8-24 MB 70 ns FP	CT65545 1 MB DRAM	None	540 MB				1.44 MB FDD NiHM Battery - 2.5 hr
365ED	May 1996	Oct 1996	$2,499	10.4"	-	640×480	5x86c - 100 MHz 33 MHz bus 16 KB cache Coprocessor	8-24 MB 70 ns FP	CT65545 1 MB DRAM	ESS1688	540 MB				4X CD-ROM drive NiHM Battery - 2.3 hr
365X	May 1996	Oct 1997	$2,499 (DS)	10.4" 11.3"	10.4"	640×480 800x600	Pentium I 100-133 MHz 60-66 MHz bus	8-40 MB 70 ns EDO	CYBER9320 1 MB DRAM	ESS1688	810 MB		1.08 GB		1.44 MB FDD NiHM Battery - 2.5 hr
365X	May 1996	Oct 1997	$2,899 (TFT)	10.4" 11.3"	10.4"	640×480 800x600	Pentium I 100-133 MHz 60-66 MHz bus	8-40 MB 70 ns EDO	CYBER9320 1 MB DRAM	ESS1688	810 MB		1.08 GB		1.44 MB FDD NiHM Battery - 2.5 hr
365XD	May 1996	Oct 1997	$2,799 (DS)	10.4" 11.3"	10.4" 11.3"	640×480 800x600	Pentium I 100-133 MHz 60-66 MHz bus	8-40 MB 70 ns EDO	CYBER9320 1 MB DRAM	ESS1688	810 MB	1.08 GB	1.35 GB	2.1 GB	4, 6, or 8X CD-ROM drive NiHM Battery - 2–2.5 hr
365XD	May 1996	Oct 1997	$3,699 (TFT)	10.4" 11.3"	10.4" 11.3"	640×480 800x600	Pentium I 100-133 MHz 60-66 MHz bus	8-40 MB 70 ns EDO	CYBER9320 1 MB DRAM	ESS1688	810 MB	1.08 GB	1.35 GB	2.1 GB	4, 6, or 8X CD-ROM drive NiHM Battery - 2–2.5 hr

== Trivia ==
- In July 1997, the Santa Cruz Sheriff's office purchased 29 IBM ThinkPad 365Xs to be used in patrol cars by officers. This was said to be more efficient by allowing more time for officers to deal with problems and reduce time hand-writing reports by up to two hours a day. The ThinkPads were purchased through a grant of over $59,000.

Preceded by IBM ThinkPad 360	IBM ThinkPad 365; 1995–1997	Succeeded by IBM ThinkPad 380
