= ThinkPad 360 =

Notebook computer series by IBM

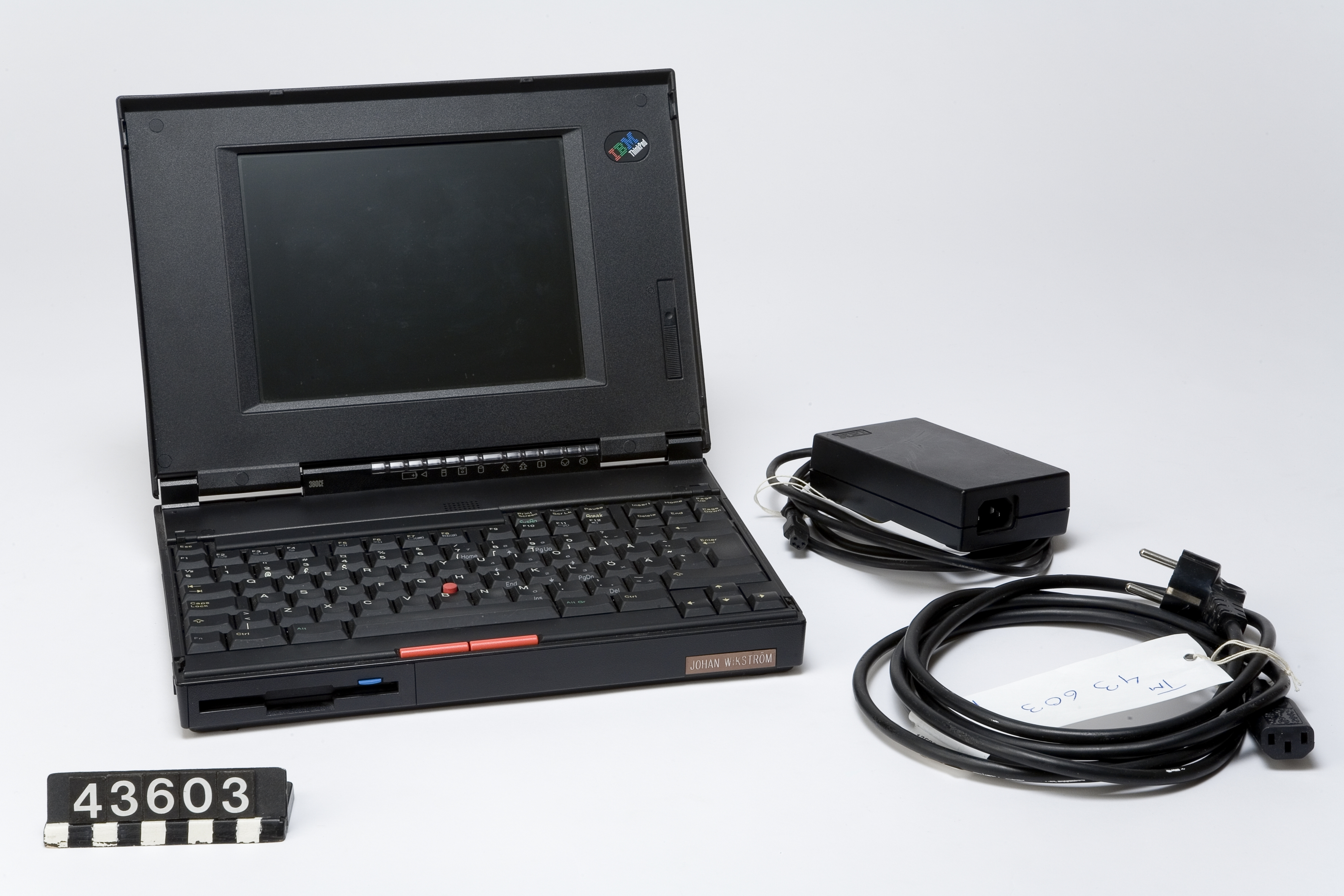
- IBM Thinkpad 360CE
- Manufacturer: IBM
- Type: Notebook Computer
- Released: May 1994; 32 years ago
- Introductory price: Starting at US$2,099 (equivalent to $4,559 in 2025)
- Discontinued: June 1996; 30 years ago
- Operating system: All: IBM PC DOS 6.21/6.3; Windows 3.1x; P/PE: PenDOS 2.2
- CPU: 360/C/CS/P: Intel 80486SX @ 33 MHz; CSE/CE/PE: Intel 80486DX2 @ 50 MHz
- Memory: 4–20 MB
- Display: 360: 9.5" DSTN 640x480 Mono; CS/P/CSE/PE: 9.5" DSTN 640x480 Color; C/CE: 8.4" TFT 640x480 Color

The IBM ThinkPad 360 series was a notebook computer series introduced in 1994 by IBM as part of their ThinkPad laptop series. It was succeeded in late 1995 by the IBM ThinkPad 365 series.

== History ==
On October 17, 1994, the ThinkPad 360 CE and CSE were released. Both had a Intel 486DX-2 50 MHz processor, 4 MB of memory, a 1.44 MB floppy disk drive, and a 250, 340, 540, or 810 MB hard disk drive with PC DOS 6.0/Windows 3.1 and various included software. Both units came with a Nickel-Metal Hydride (NiMH) battery pack that could last 2.9 hours in a CSE and 3.2 hours in a CE, while only taking 1.5 hours to charge. Both the CE and CSE were mainly the same in terms of specifications, with the only notable difference of a 9.5in 640x480 DSTN screen for the CSE and a 8.4in 640x480 TFT screen for the CE. It cost between $2,649 and $4,199 for a unit depending on the configuration.

Many of the models in the 360 series were discontinued by IBM on December 21, 1995. This included the CS, C, P, CSE, and CE.

== Features ==
Most models in the 360 series shipped with IBM PC DOS 6.3 and Windows 3.11 as the included operating system, while some such as the 360P and PE shipped with DOS 6.21 and PenDOS 2.2.

All models in the series featured an Intel 486SX or DX2 processor running at 33 to 50 MHz, and a WD90C24A2 or WD90C24 video controller with 1 MB of video memory. A standard of 4 MB RAM was installed, which was soldered onto the motherboard. The RAM could be upgraded to up to 20 MB in total if the user had a IC DRAM Card, which goes into a slot under the floppy disk drive.

The standard hard drive size was 170 or 340 MB, later adding the option to 540 MB. All models in the series had a 1.44 MB floppy disk drive in an ultrabay.

Two notable models in the series, the 360P and 360PE, featured a pen touch display, which could also fold back and down to close like a tablet.

== Models ==
IBM ThinkPad 360 — One of the first models in the series, it introduced a Intel 486SX processor running at 33 MHz. It had 4 MB of RAM, which could only be upgraded to a maximum of 20 MB with a IC DRAM Card. It featured a 9.5-inch monochrome screen, and could hold a battery charge up to 10 hours. Other features included: 170 or 340 MB hard drive options, a 3.5-inch 1.44 MB removable floppy drive, Trackpoint II pointing device; and 1 Type III, or 2 Type II, or 2 Type I PCMCIA slots.

IBM ThinkPad 360C — Released the same time as the 360, the 360C model was basically identical to the 360 but with a 8.5-inch TFT color screen, and a decrease to 5 hours of battery life. It had a 0.5lb increase in weight, and it cost over $4,399 if it came with 8 MB of RAM and a 170 MB hard disk.

IBM ThinkPad 360CS — Also released the same time as the 360C and 360 base model, the 360CS model was also identical to the 360C and 360, with only a few differences. It had a 9.5-inch DSTN screen, a slight increase in battery life from 7 to 8 hours, and a slight weight increase of 0.1lb.

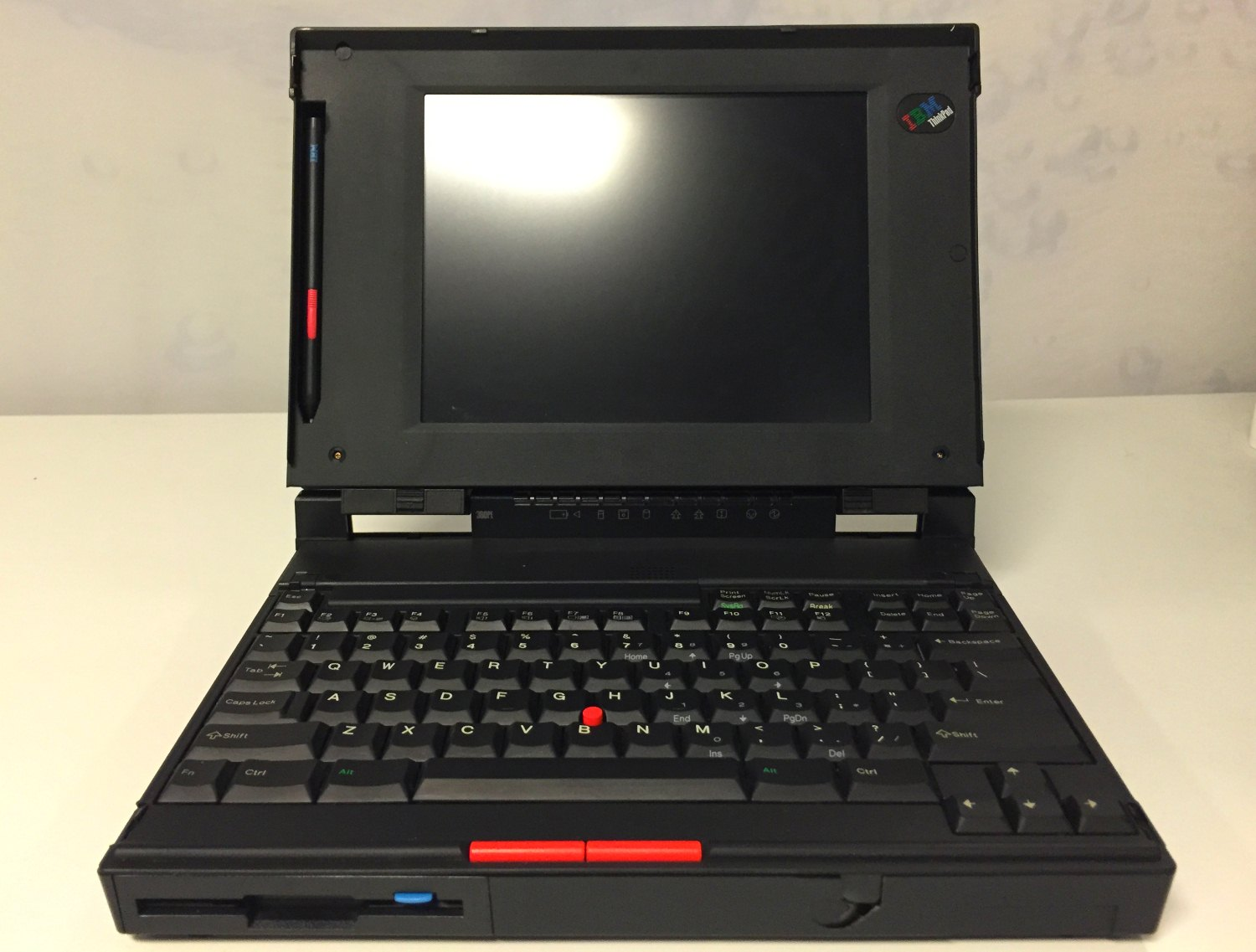
The 360PE, opened in its 'natural' mode

IBM ThinkPad 360P — The 360P model introduced at $3,399 was a unique model, as it featured a pen touch display. The pen was a pressure-sensitive input device (Stylus). It had a DSTN 9.5-inch 640×480 display. The machine ran DOS 6.21 with PenDOS 2.2 and had a battery life of about 5 hours. Other features included: Ultrabay with 1.44 MB floppy drive, Trackpoint II pointing device; and 1 Type III, or 2 Type II, or 2 Type I PCMCIA slots.

IBM ThinkPad 360PE — The 360PE model was almost identical to the 360P, having a small upgrade to a Intel 486 DX2 running at 50 MHz, a 17 MHz increase in speed. It also offered a slightly larger hard drive size option of 540 MB, and was the first and only model in the series to offer built-in audio with a CS4248 audio controller. The 360PE cost $300 more than the 360P at $3,699.

IBM ThinkPad 360CE — One of the final models, the 360CE was a slight upgrade from the earlier 360/C/CS models, offering a Intel 486 DX2 running at 50 MHz, a 8.4-inch 640×480 TFT display, and an additional 540 MB option for hard disk size. Other features included: Ultrabay with 1.44 MB floppy drive, Trackpoint II pointing device; and 1 Type III, or 2 Type II, or 2 Type I PCMCIA slots.

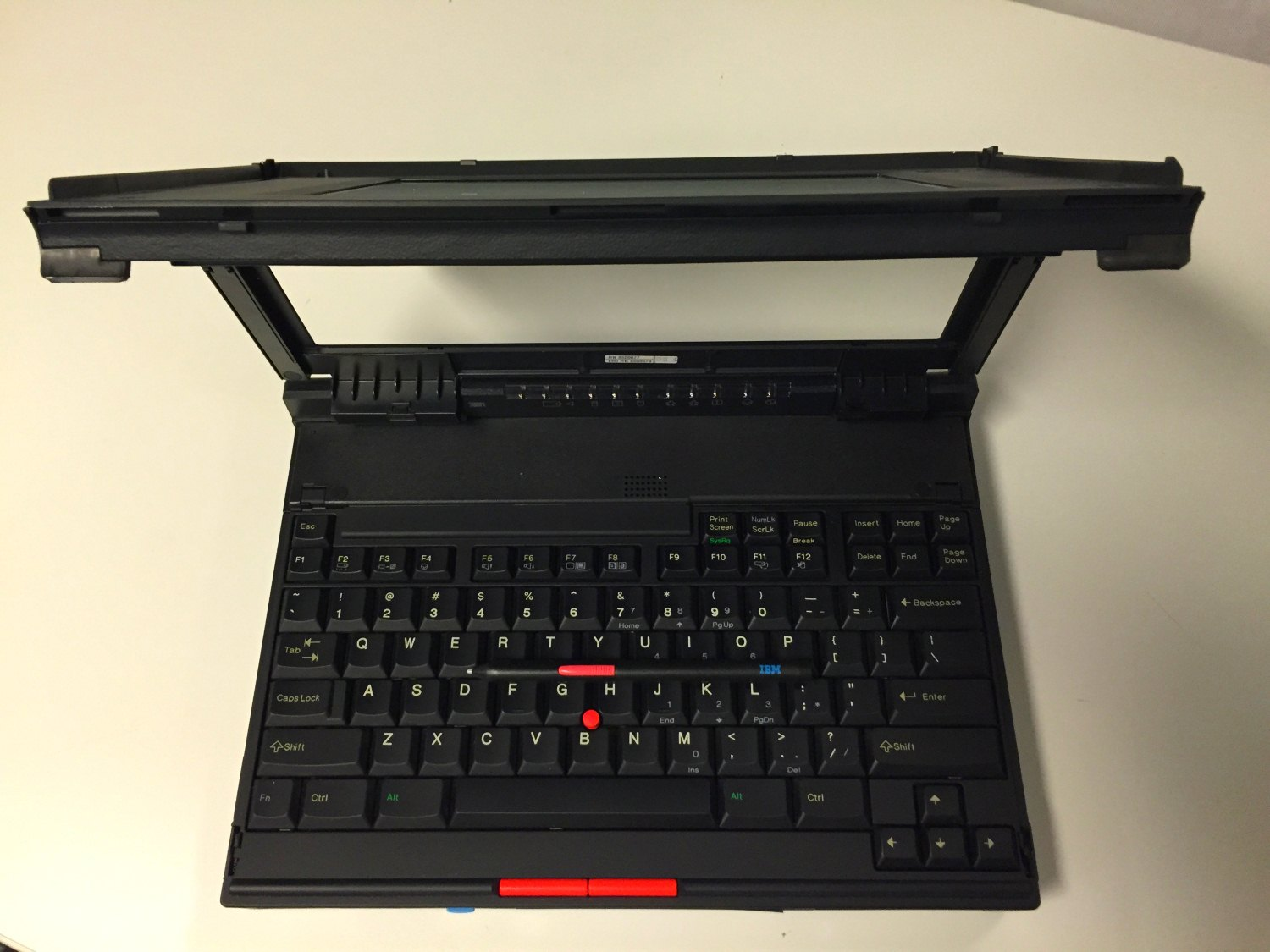
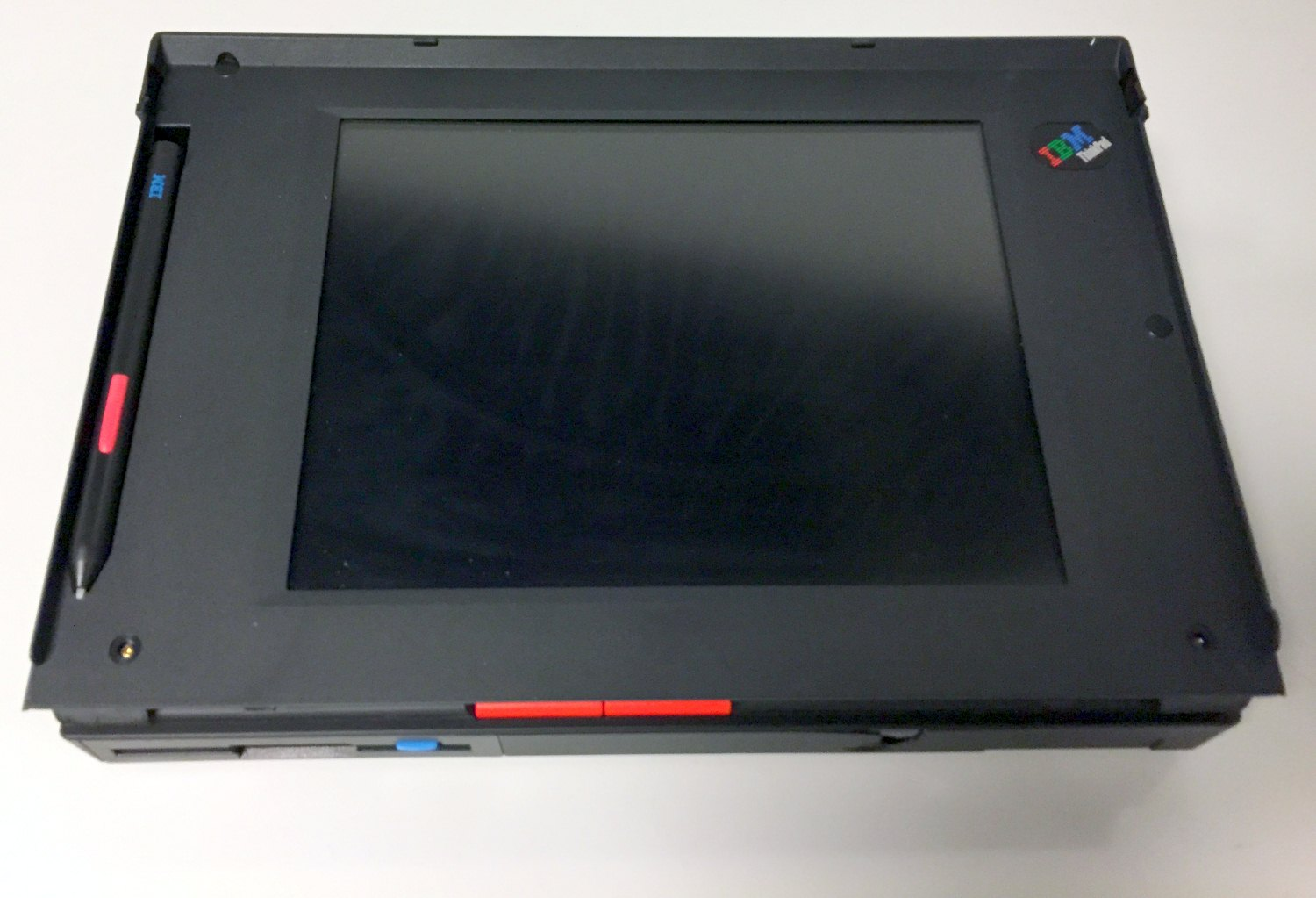
The 360PE in mid-fold showing how the monitor rotates over the unit; folded in its 'tablet' mode allowing the laptop to be held as a tablet would

IBM ThinkPad 360CSE — The last model of the series, the 360CSE was again another nearly identical model as the previous unit, only offering a 9.5-inch 640×480 DSTN display rather than the 360CE's TFT display.

== Comparison ==
Model	Introduction Date	Withdrawal Date	Base Price	Display Options		Resolution	CPU	Memory	Video Controller	Audio Controller	Hard Drive Options			Misc Info
Model	Introduction Date	Withdrawal Date	Base Price	DSTN	TFT	Resolution	CPU	Memory	Video Controller	Audio Controller	Hard Drive Options			Misc Info
360	May 1994	May 1995	$1,899	9.5" Mono	–	640x480	80486SX - 33 MHz 8 KB cache	4–20 MB 70 ns	WD90C24A2 1 MB DRAM	None	170 MB		340 MB	1.44 MB FDD NiHM Battery – 4.6 hr
360CS	May 1994	Dec 21 1995	$2,349	9.5" Color	–	640x480	80486SX - 33 MHz 8 KB cache	4–20 MB 70 ns	WD90C24A2 1 MB DRAM	None	170 MB		340 MB	1.44 MB FDD NiHM Battery – 3 hr
360C	Jun 1994	Dec 21 1995	$2,229	–	8.4" Color	640x480	80486SX - 33 MHz 8 KB cache	4–20 MB 70 ns	WD90C24A2 1 MB DRAM	None	170 MB		340 MB	1.44 MB FDD NiHM Battery - 3.5 hr
360P	Jun 1994	Dec 21 1995	$2,899	9.5" Color	–	640x480	80486SX - 33 MHz 8 KB cache	4–20 MB 70 ns	WD90C24A2 1 MB DRAM	None	170 MB		340 MB	1.44 MB FDD NiHM Battery - 3.3 hr Pen enabled display
360CSE	Oct 1994	Dec 21 1995	$2,399	9.5" Color	-	640x480	80486DX2 - 50 MHz 25 MHz bus 8 KB cache	4–20 MB 70 ns	WD90C24A/A2 1 MB DRAM	None	170 MB	340 MB	540 MB	1.44 MB FDD NiHM Battery – 2.9 hr
360CE	Oct 1994	Dec 21 1995	$2,799	-	8.4" Color	640x480	80486DX2 - 50 MHz 25 MHz bus 8 KB cache	4–20 MB 70 ns	WD90C24A/A2 1 MB DRAM	None	170 MB	340 MB	540 MB	1.44 MB FDD NiHM Battery - 3.2 hr
360PE	Apr 1995	Jun 1996	$3,699	9.5" Color	–	640x480	80486DX2 - 50 MHz 25 MHz bus 8 KB cache	4–20 MB 70 ns	WD90C24A/A2 1 MB DRAM	CS4248	340 MB	540 MB		1.44 MB FDD NiHM Battery – 2.5 hr Pen enabled display

Preceded by IBM ThinkPad 350	IBM ThinkPad 360; 1994–1996	Succeeded by IBM ThinkPad 365
