= Direct tension indicator =

Mechanical Load Cells

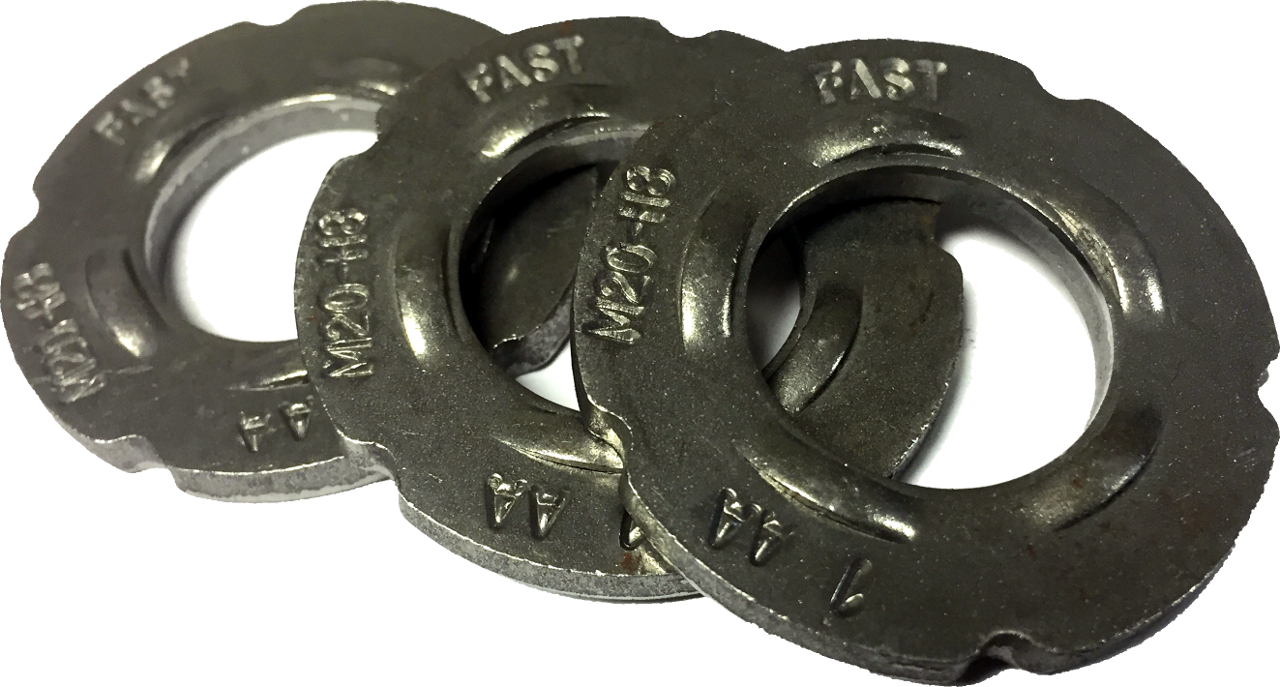
M20 DTI washers

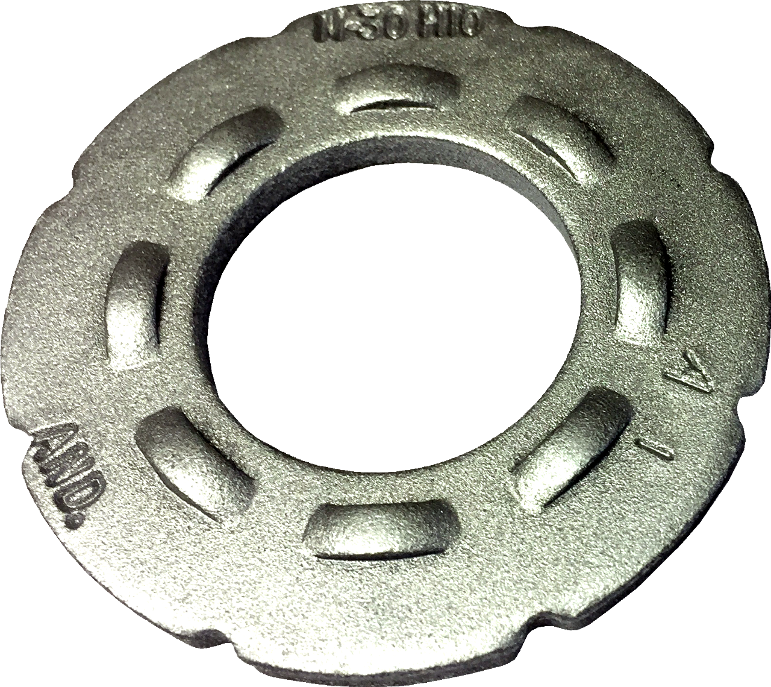
M30 DTI washer

Direct tension indicators, or DTIs, are single-use mechanical load cells used to indicate when the required tension has been achieved in structural fastener assemblies.

== History ==
The load-indicating washer was invented in England in 1962.

== Specification ==
The standard for DTIs in North America is the ASTM International series of standards and the specific designation for testing and manufacturing DTIs is ASTM F959: Standard Specification for Compressible-Washer Type Direct Tension Indicators for Use with Structural Fasteners. DTIs are generally installed in accordance with the Research Council on Structural Connections (RCSC) Specification for Structural Joints using High-Strength Bolts. The RCSC specification has been adopted, in its entirety, by the American Institute of Steel Construction (AISC) and appears as section 16 of that organization's Steel Construction Manual.

DTIs within the RCSC specification section 8.2.4 are described thus: "ASTM F959 direct tension indicators are recognized in this Specification as a bolt-tension-indicating device. Direct tension indicators are hardened washer shaped devices incorporating small arch-like protrusions on the bearing surface that are designed to deform in a controlled manner when subjected to compressive load."

Regarding the ASTM F959 manufacturing specification, the abstract from the ASTM website describe DTIs as "capable of indicating the achievement of a specified minimum bolt tension in a structural bolt and are intended for installation under either a bolt head or a hardened washer. Steel materials used in the manufacture of direct tension indicators shall be designed, processed, heat treated, and protectively coated as specified. The direct tension indicators shall conform to required chemical composition, compression load, and dimensional values."

Like other fastener components, DTIs are covered by the Fastener Quality Act of 1999 in section 3: Definitions (6), where a DTI is described as "a load-indicating washer, that is through-hardened".

== Functioning ==
DTIs are a function of induced tension. As a fastener assembly is tightened, the arch-like protrusions are compressed, and the change in distance between the base of the protrusions of the DTI washer and the protrusion apex correlates to a value of tensile force induced into the fastener. This distance can be verified by insertion of a tapered feeler gage between the protrusions to the bolt shank. The number of instances the bolt shank can be reached by the feeler gage is then compared to either the results of a pre-installation verification procedure or the manufacturer's instructions.

Applied Bolting Technology Products, LLC manufactures self-indicating DTIs, which are a subset of the standard DTIs described above. Squirter brand DTIs from Applied Bolting Technology Products, LLC contain a small amount of material in the cavity of each protrusion. Such DTIs are mechanically and metallurgically identical to the standard DTIs described above, except that as the protrusions of these self-indicating DTIs collapse upon tightening, the cavity material is expelled to the outer diameter of the device, giving a visual indication of protrusion compression, i.e. bolt tension. While not approved by the ASTM or specifically mentioned within the RCSC specification, such DTIs are allowable because the RCSC specification requires all structural DTIs to conform to the ASTM F959 standard, whose reference documentation includes the ASME B18.2.6 standard. Since ASME B18.2.6 section 5.1 permits the inclusion of features to facilitate silicone-emitting DTIs, Squirter DTIs from Applied Bolting Technology Products, LLC are permissible and can be installed and inspected per the RCSC specification.

== Uses ==
One of the more common uses of DTIs is in conjunction with EN 14399 pre-load bolt assemblies.
