= ThinkPad 380 =

Computer model by IBM

ThinkPad 380 series

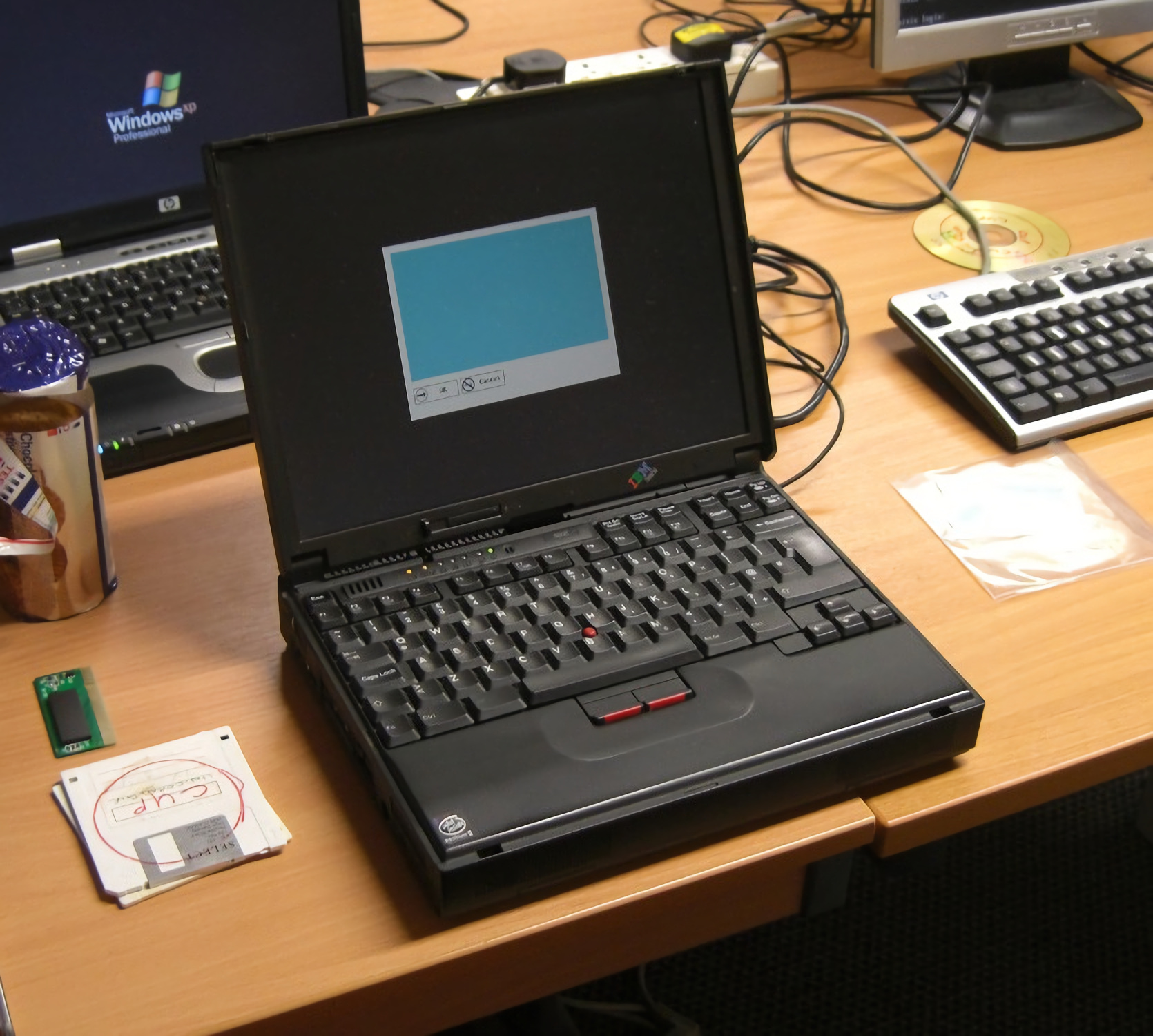
- An IBM ThinkPad 380Z
- Manufacturer: IBM
- Type: Notebook Computer
- Released: NA: May 13 1997
- Lifespan: 1997-1999
- Discontinued: June 1999
- Media: Floppy Disk, CD, DVD, USB
- Operating system: Windows 95; Windows 95 OSR2; Windows 98; NT 4.0
- CPU: P54CS @ 150 MHz; P55C @ 150-266 MHz; Pentium II @ 233-300 MHz
- Memory: 16-160 MB EDO
- Storage: 1.08 - 4 GB internal hard drive
- Display: Types: 12.1in TFT/HPA/FRSTN/DSTN; SVGA 640x480 or 800x600; 11.3in TFT; XGA 640x480, 800x600, or 1024x768
- Graphics: NeoMagic; NM2093; NM2160B; NM2200
- Sound: Crystal Semiconductors: CS4263; CS4263B; CS4237B
- Input: Built-in Keyboard; TrackPoint; 1 x VGA port; 1 x Serial port; 1 x USB 1.1 port (XD, Z); 1 x PS/2 port; 1 x 3.5mm audio in, out, mic in
- Connectivity: LAN Adapter (via PCMCIA card)
- Weight: Up to 7.2 lb (3.3 kg)
- Predecessor: IBM ThinkPad 365
- Successor: IBM ThinkPad 385
- Website: ibm.com

The IBM ThinkPad 380 was a notebook computer series released May 13, 1997 by IBM as part of their ThinkPad laptop series. Notable for incorporating a CD-ROM and a floppy drive, it was considered a mid-range laptop by IBM at the time, and sold well. The series was the successor to the IBM ThinkPad 365.

== Features ==
The 380 shipped with Windows 95, but they were capable of running Windows 3.11, Windows NT, OS/2 Warp, Windows 98, Windows Me, Red Hat Linux, as well as various other Linux distributions. Originally, there were two models; the base ThinkPad 380 and the ThinkPad 380D, which was equipped with a CD-ROM drive. The 380 came with an Intel Pentium processor running at 150 MHz with or without the optional MMX feature. With only 16 MB of base RAM included and a base hard drive only 1.08 GB in size, Windows 3.11 was a better operating system choice for the base model; however, with 32 MB installed it could run Windows 95 properly.

== Models and features ==
- IBM ThinkPad 380E — The 380E model introduced several additional features, along with more optional features available. Along with the 16 MB soldered onto the motherboard (a feature carried over from the original 380 model), a single slot accessible through an external cover on the bottom of the case could hold a memory card up to 64 MB in size, allowing a maximum of 80 MB to be installed. Other features included: an internal 56k modem option, and a choice between the base 150 MHz processor or a modestly improved 166 MHz processor, both of which now integrated MMX from Intel as a standard feature.
- IBM ThinkPad 380ED — The 380ED model was virtually identical to the 380E, but with the 166 MHz processor standard, a .3 lb (0.1 kg) increase in weight, an optional 2.5-hour battery along with the model standard two-hour version, and a gradual increase in hard drive size from 2.1 to 3.2 GB, and then to 5.1 GB (which became optional for the older models).
- IBM ThinkPad 380XD — The 380XD model introduced the 233 MHz Pentium II processor with MMX, and included 32 MB on the motherboard instead of 16 MB, increasing the memory limit to 96 MB (it unofficially supports up to 160 MB with the use of a 128 MB EDO 144-pin SODIMM). It introduced features such as a USB port, the ability for the customer to replace the hard drive (something that was usually only doable by the factory in the older models), hard drive options from the base 3.2 GB drive to 4 GB or 6.4 GB, the latter of which available only to the 380XD and 380Z (at least from the factory), and an optional 266 MHz processor upgrade.
- IBM ThinkPad 380Z — The 380Z was the last model of the 380 series to be produced. It introduced the optional 300 MHz Pentium II mobile processor into the line, and included advanced features such as a S.M.A.R.T. hard drive, a larger 13.3 in (340 mm) TFT LCD screen with a maximum resolution of 1024x768 (compared to the 12.1 in (310 mm), 800x600 maximum on the older models), ACPI support, the integration of higher-quality speakers with the addition of an internal sub-woofer, and its own port replicator that would only work with the 380Z.

All the models—apart from the base 380—could run versions of Windows up to and including Windows XP. For Windows XP to run smoothly, however, they would need to be configured with at least 64 MB of RAM and a 2.0 GB hard drive or larger.

== Reception ==
Clint Basinger from Lazy Game Reviews has published an unboxing and review of the ThinkPad 380ED in 2021.

Preceded by IBM ThinkPad 365	IBM ThinkPad 380	Succeeded by IBM ThinkPad 385
