= Ergon, Inc. =

American petrolrum products company

- Type: Private
- Industry: Petroleum
- Founded: 1954
- Headquarters: Flowood, Mississippi
- Key people: Kris Patrick (CEO), Tyler Bishop (CPP)
- Products: Petroleum Products and Services
- Number of employees: 4,200 (2024)
- Website: ergon.com

Ergon, Inc. is a privately owned company based in Flowood, Mississippi. The company, founded by Leslie Lampton in 1954 with two employees, was built to serve industries essential to global manufacturing and infrastructure. Today, Ergon supports customers and partners in more than 100 countries.

== Companies and subsidiaries ==
- Ergon Inc. consists of companies that operate under three segments, as represented below.

=== Energy & Specialty Solutions ===
- Ergon Refining, Inc. (ERI)
  - Ergon International, Inc.
  - Ergon Mexico
  - Ergon Latin America, Inc.
- Ergon – West Virginia, Inc.
- Process Oils, Inc.
  - MogOil GmbH
- Ergon Chemicals, LLC
  - Resinall Corp

=== Pavement & Coating Resources ===
- Ergon Asphalt & Emulsions, Inc. (EAE, Ergon A&E)
  - Ergon Asfaltos México HC, LLC (EAM)
  - Blueknight Energy Partners, L.P. and Subsidiaries (BKEP)
  - ErgonArmor, a Division of Ergon Asphalt & Emulsions
  - Paragon Technical Services, Inc.
  - Ergon Asphalt Holdings, LLC
    - Ergon Asphalt Partners, LP
  - Ergon Asphalt Holdings II, LLC
    - Associated Asphalt, Inc.
    - Associated Asphalt Partners, LLC
  - Bryan & Bryan Asphalt, LLC
    - Trinity Asphalt, Ltd.
- Crafco, Inc.

=== Integrated Services & Logistics ===
- Ergon Properties, Inc.
- Ergon Construction Group, Inc.
  - ISO Services
  - Alliant Construction
- Ergon Midstream, LLC
- Ergon Oil Purchasing, Inc. (EOP)
- Ergon Terminaling, Inc. (ETI)
  - Ergon Baton Rouge, Inc.
  - Ergon - St. James, Inc.
- Ergon Trucking, Inc.
- Magnolia Marine Transport Company (MMT)
- Ergon Marine & Industrial Supply, Inc.
  - Big Valley, LLC
- Tricor Refining, LLC (50%)
- Lampton-Love, Inc., and Subsidiaries

== Founder ==
Leslie B. Lampton, businessman, philanthropist and founder of Ergon, the energy-based company he established in 1954, died Tuesday, April 17, 2018, of natural causes at his home in Jackson, Mississippi. He was 92 years old.

After serving in the Navy during World War II, graduating from Ole Miss, and then serving again in the Navy during the Korean conflict, Lampton returned to his hometown of Jackson, Mississippi, with a plan to enter the oil business. With the support of his bride, the former Dorothy Lee Crum, Lampton embarked on a business career spanning 64 years that would see him at the helm of Ergon, a diversified empire that provides jobs to over 4,200 employees in Mississippi, 29 other states, and several other countries. While other businesses were moving to Texas during the oil boom years, Lampton made a commitment to remain in Mississippi, his home state.

He was a friend to many, but he was most comfortable talking with his employees, the persons he acknowledged as the success behind Ergon. He had a knack for hiring good people. He supported his employees in taking risks necessary for businesses to succeed, whether entering new markets or developing new products. He always reminded the employees that it was not all about profits. Lampton believed that you had to enjoy what you were doing in order to be successful in life.

He supported activities for the children of his employees. He also supported charitable organizations in the communities where Ergon has a presence.

Lampton preferred not to seek any recognition for his charitable donations, telling others who wanted to use his name that he was just doing what the Lord asked all of us to do. Lampton was a member of the Catholic Church, and his faith was the guiding influence in his life.
