= IBM PS/2 Model CL57 SX =

1992 IBM laptop

- Also known as: Type 8554
- Manufacturer: IBM and Toshiba
- Type: Laptop (notebook)
- Released: April 1992
- Introductory price: US$5,995 (equivalent to $13,750 in 2025)
- Operating system: MS-DOS, OS/2, Microsoft Windows
- CPU: 386SX @ 20 MHz (optional math co-processor)
- Memory: 2–16 MB RAM (2 sockets)
- Storage: 80 MB hard drive 3.5” 1.44 MB floppy drive
- Display: 10.4" color TFT LCD
- Graphics: VGA (640x480)
- Input: trackball
- Weight: 11 lb (5.0 kg)
- Predecessor: IBM PS/2 L40 SX

The IBM Personal System/2 Model CL57 SX (stylized as PS/2 Model CL57 SX) is the first notebook computer with a color TFT screen released by IBM in 1992. It was released a few months before the introduction of the ThinkPad series.

== Background ==
It was developed by a joint venture between IBM and Toshiba. The sibling model in a PS/55 line was a PS/55 N27sx laptop.

== Specifications ==
It is based on the Micro Channel Architecture. It contains a 386SX at 20MHz, between 2 and 16 MB RAM, a 10.4" color TFT, weighed 11 lb (5.0 kg) and has a trackball.

It can run IBM OS/2.

It was priced at US$5,995 (equivalent to $13,750 in 2025) and available from April 1992.

== Reception ==
It was not favorably received by the market.

Preceded by PS/2 L40 SX	PS/2 CL57 SX	Succeeded by ThinkPad 700
