= Department of Trade and Industry =

Department of Trade and Industry may refer to:

== Current ==
- Department of Trade and Industry (Isle of Man)
- Department of Trade and Industry (Philippines)
- Department of Trade, Industry and Competition (South Africa)

== Former ==
- Department of Trade and Industry (Australia), an Australian Government Department that existed between 1963 and 1972
- Department of Trade and Industry (United Kingdom), a UK department that existed between 1970 and 2007
