= Display Technologies, Inc. =

Joint venture between IBM Japan Ltd and Toshiba Corporation

- Industry: Display device manufacturing
- Fate: Dissolved
- Owner: IBM Japan Ltd.; Toshiba Corporation
- Website: dti-lcd.com at the Wayback Machine (archived February 2, 2001)

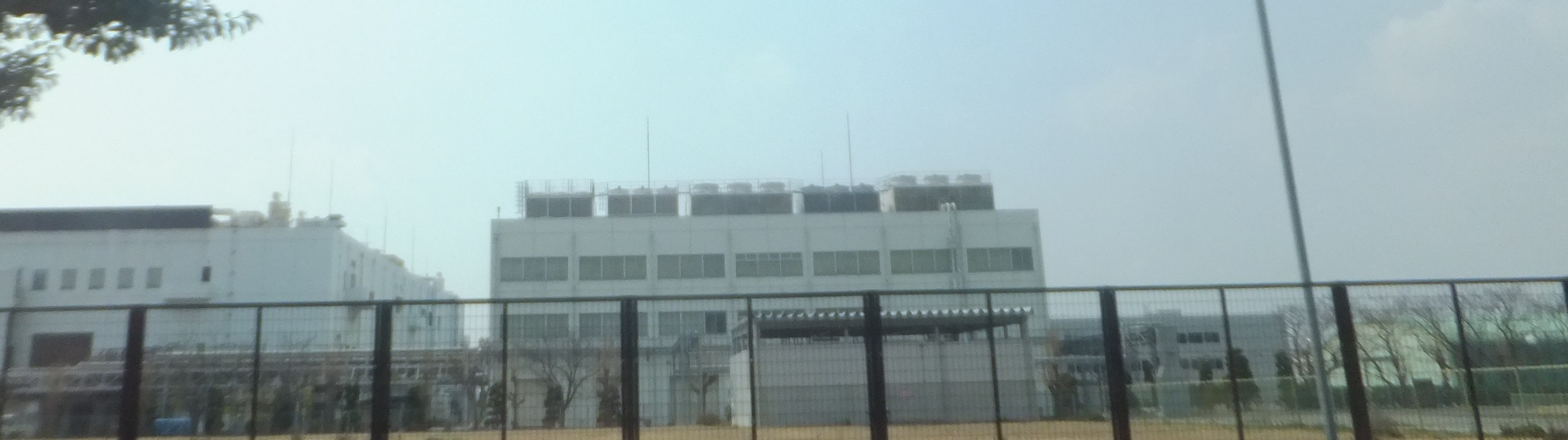
Toshiba factory in Himeji

Display Technologies, Inc. (DTI) was a joint venture between IBM Japan Ltd. and Toshiba Corporation for manufacturing LCD panels.

== Dissolution ==
The decision to end the joint venture was announced on May 16, 2001. The joint venture was replaced by a deal with Chi Mei Optoelectronics. Display Technologies would dissolve by late August 2002. Toshiba planned to expand their business into mid and small sided displays, while IBM would focus on large computer displays. In June 2001, IBM launched the T220.
