= ThinkPad 570 =

IBM Thinkpad 570
- Also known as: IBM ThinkPad i1157
- Manufacturer: IBM
- Type: Notebook Computer
- Released: NA: April 1999
- Lifespan: 1999-2001
- Discontinued: February 2001
- Media: Floppy Disk, CD, DVD
- Operating system: Windows 98; Windows 98 SE; NT 4.0; Windows 2000
- CPU: Pentium II @ 333 / 366 MHz; Pentium III @ 450 / 500 MHz; Celeron @ 500 MHz
- Memory: 64-320 MB SDRAM
- Storage: 4 - 12 GB internal hard drive
- Display: Types 12.1/13.3in TFT: SVGA - 800x600; XGA - 1024x768; External LCD
- Graphics: NeoMagic - NM2200
- Sound: Crystal Semiconductors CS4280/CS4297
- Input: Built-in Keyboard; TrackPoint; 1 x VGA port; 1 x Serial port; 1 x USB 1.1 port; 1 x 3.5mm audio in, out, mic in; 1 x RJ-11 port
- Connectivity: Built-In Modem; LAN Adapter (via PCMCIA card)
- Predecessor: IBM ThinkPad 560
- Website: pc.ibm.com at the Wayback Machine (archived 1999-08-28)

The IBM ThinkPad 570 is a notebook series from the ThinkPad line by IBM.

== Models ==
The ThinkPad 570 came in two models, the 570 and the 570e. They both were the final models in the ThinkPad 500 series. The 570E was also sold in Japan as the i Series 1157.

Model	Intro / Disc	Display	Video	Audio	Processor	Memory	Hard Drive	Chipset	Misc
570	Apr 1999 / Jul 2000	SVGA / 12.1in TFT 800x600 XGA / 13.3in TFT 1024x768	NeoMagic MagicMedia NM2200 2.5 MB SGRAM AGP 1x	Crystal Semi. CS4280/CS4297 16-bit	Pentium II - 300, 333 or 366 MHz 66 MHz bus 256 KB cache	64-192 MB 66 MHz SDRAM 144 pin	4.0 GB or 6.4 GB EIDE	Intel 440BX	External 1.44 MB FDD CD-ROM 24x-10x or DVD-ROM TrackPoint Li-Ion Battery / 3-3.5 hr
570E	Feb 2000 / Feb 2001	XGA / 13.3in TFT 1024x768	NeoMagic MagicMedia NM2200 2.5 MB SGRAM AGP 1x	Crystal Semi. CS4280/CS4297 16-bit	Pentium III - 450 or 500 MHz 100 MHz bus 256 KB cache	64-320 MB 100 MHz SDRAM 144 pin	6.0 GB or 12.0 GB EIDE	Intel 440BX	External 1.44 MB FDD CD-ROM 24x-10x or DVD-ROM 6x-2x TrackPoint Li-Ion Battery / 3 hr
i Series 1157	June 2000 / ?	XGA / 13.3in TFT 1024x768	NeoMagic MagicMedia NM2200 2.5 MB SGRAM AGP 1x	Crystal Semi. CS4280/CS4297 16-bit	Celeron - 500 MHz 100 MHz bus 128 KB cache	64 MB 100 MHz SDRAM 144 pin	12.0 GB	Intel 440BX	

Preceded by IBM ThinkPad 560	IBM ThinkPad 570	Succeeded by ThinkPad X series
