= Lenovo Skylight =

Linux portable computer

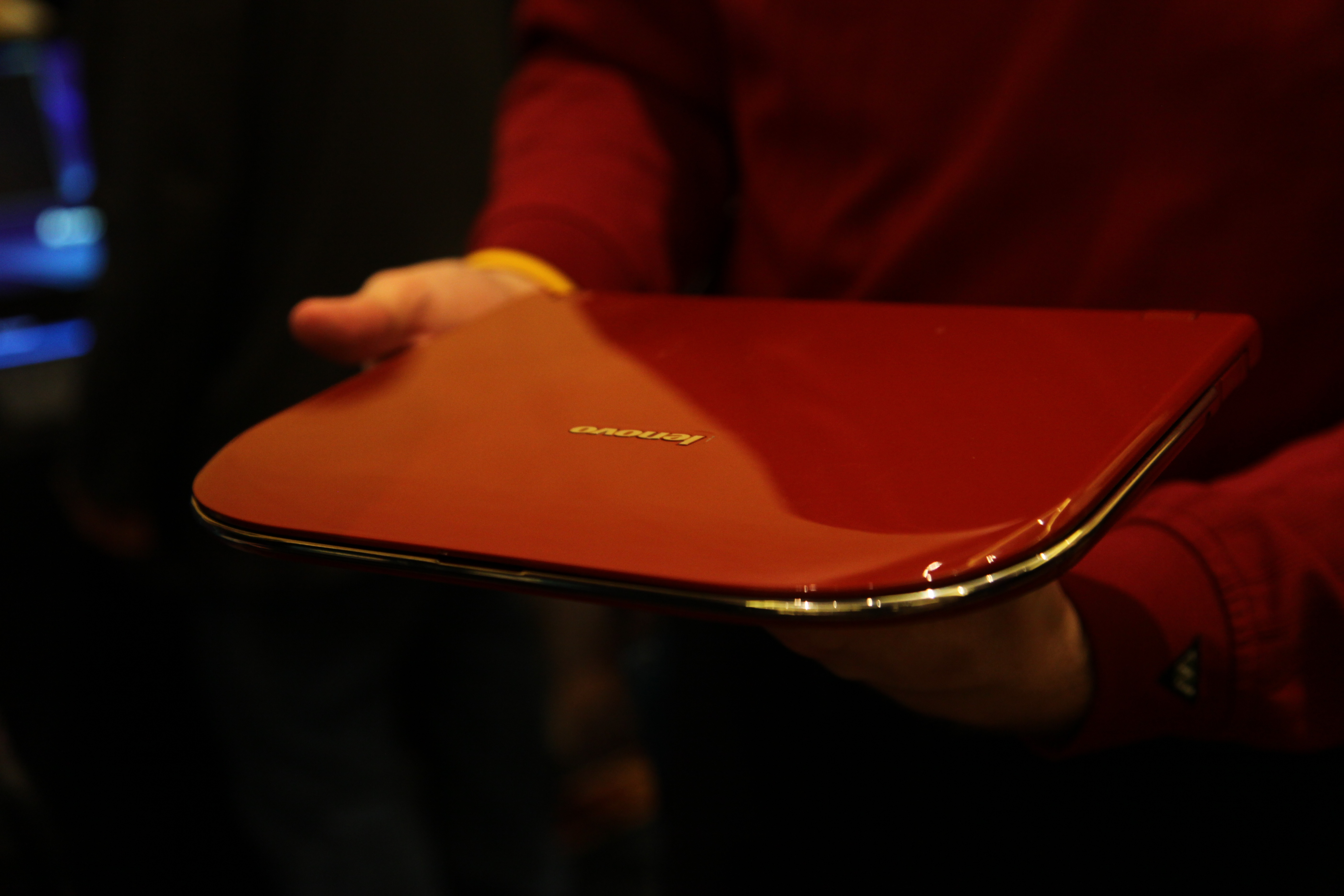
- Manufacturer: Lenovo
- Type: Smartbook
- Media: micro SDHC and SDHC card reader
- Operating system: Linux
- CPU: Qualcomm
- Memory: 512 MB
- Storage: 8 GB mini SD card, 8 GB flash, 4 GB USB stick
- Display: 10.1 in (260 mm) diagonal WXGA (1280 × 720) LCD
- Sound: internal microphone, mono speaker, stereo output
- Input: Keyboard, Touchpad
- Camera: 1.3 MP
- Connectivity: WLAN 802.11, 3G Quadband WCDMA + SIM card slot, 2×USB 2.0, mini HDMI, 3.5 mm stereo out
- Weight: 1.95 lb

Lenovo Skylight is a cancelled small portable computer concept with mobile data capabilities (sometimes called a smartbook) designed by Richard Sapper for Lenovo. The project was announced in January 2010, but was cancelled less than six months later.

== Design ==
Skylight was designed by Richard Sapper. After having a conversation with David Hill, Vice President of Lenovo Brand Management on November 12, 2008 Sapper agreed to create a design for the device despite the short turn around needed. Sapper had to deliver his completed design by December 18, 2008. This turnaround time was so short, Sapper began working on the design before Lenovo officially approved him as the designer. He was successful in delivering two complete models.

The USB stick that was included on Skylight was originally designed as a removable telephone headset to be used with the wireless connectivity built into the device.

== History ==
A Lenovo device was submitted to the FCC in October 2008, rumored to be the smartbook in question. Qualcomm was rumored to announce a smartbook at an analyst meeting on November 12, 2009. A Lenovo device concept was shown, and reported that it would be announced officially at the Consumer Electronics Show of January 2010. In early January 2010, it was announced that the Lenovo smartbook's name would be "Skylight" and more detailed specifications were made public.

Skylight was expected to be sold through AT&T carrier in the US for $499USD with no contract. Users would have purchased data plans to use the 3G connectivity while away from Wi-Fi. The planned release date was April 2010.

Some of the design differences from a traditional notebook included a semicircular shape, relatively larger touchpad, and Universal Serial Bus connector which extends out from the keyboard surface. Skylight used the Snapdragon technology from Qualcomm with a custom Linux operating system. The primary function was to search the internet, message and consume content through the custom, widget-style interface called "web gadgets".

On May 28, 2010, the product was cancelled by Lenovo. They stated in a press release that it was focusing on Android-based mobile devices.
