= David Hill (designer) =

American industrial designer (born 1957)

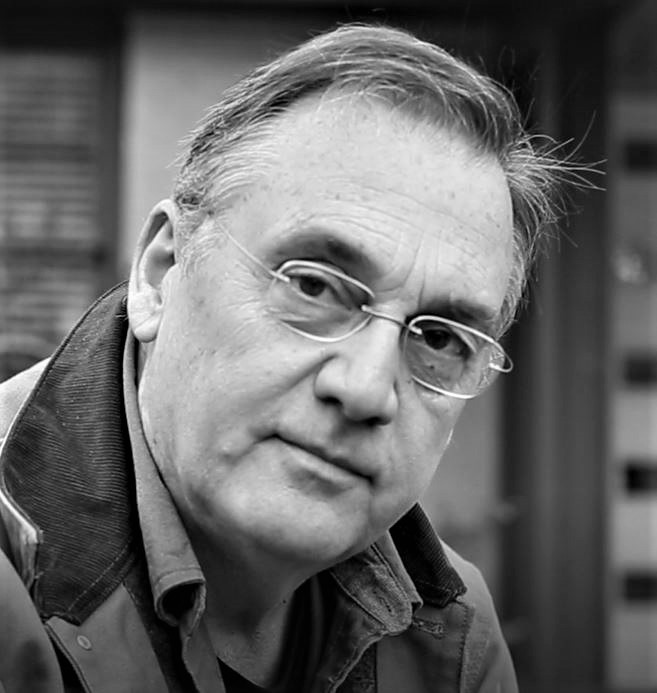
- Hill in 2018
- Born: May 15, 1957 (age 69); Wilmington, Delaware
- Occupation: Industrial Designer
- Notable work: Design of the ThinkPad
- Website: thinknextdesign.com

David Wayne Hill (born May 15, 1957) is an American industrial designer known for his work on the design of the ThinkPad. His design approach includes the "purposeful evolution" strategy which he conceived for managing the ThinkPad design identity. It served to maintain a consistent and recognizable impression even as features and technology changed. Hill was also an advocate for customer feedback to help guide improvements to designs. He worked as a designer at IBM from 1985 until the 2005 acquisition of their PC business by Lenovo, where he continued until 2017. Afterwards he founded a design consulting business. David holds over 60 issued design and utility patents. He is currently an advisor to the University of Kansas School of Architecture and Design, who named him a Distinguished Alumnus in 2018.

== Early life ==
David Hill grew up in Bartlesville, Oklahoma, where his father was a research chemist. From a young age, he built machines with cardboard, wooden blocks and Tinker Toys. As a teenager he developed a keen interest in motorcycles, which he continued to restore and race in his adult life. David attended Oklahoma State University (OSU) from 1975 to 1978 studying architecture in the School of Engineering. During his time at OSU, Hill attended a session with an industrial design professor. Hill approached the designer and asked how he could learn more and the professor recommended Kansas University's industrial design program. Hill took this advice and studied industrial design at Kansas University under Professor Downer Dykes in graduating with a Bachelor of Fine Arts in 1982. In 1981, he was awarded a scholarship to attend the International Design Conference in Aspen, Colorado where he first encountered Richard Sapper and was impressed by Sapper's grounded approach.David won a IDSA Student Merit Award in 1982 for promise in the field of industrial design. He has been an active, full member of the Industrial Designers Society of America ever since.

== Career ==
Hill worked for the design consulting firm Baugh-Deines Incorporated, Design Consultants based in Wichita from 1983 to 1985. Hill designed for several clients including Coleman, receiving a patent for a hand held light. He also worked on designs for trenching equipment, wristwatches and recreational boats.

=== 1985-2005: IBM ===
Hill started at IBM by taking the job from a classmate who was leaving IBM to return to school. He was drawn to IBM as design appeared to be part of the culture of the company.

Hill's career at IBM began in 1985 in the minicomputer division in Rochester, Minnesota, where he designed large machines. He later worked as a Senior Industrial Designer in the AS/400 Division. He also designed a computer display, an electronic clipboard for diagnostic work on mainframe computers. In 1989, Hill, designed the symbols for the following types of Local Area Network (LAN) connections: IEEE 802.5 (Token Ring), IEEE 802.4 (Token Bus) and IEEE 802.3 (Ethernet). The symbol for LAN is still used on personal computers across many hardware manufacturers. In May 1994, IBM would announce a redesign of the AS/400 in which Hill was responsible for the new design and bringing the color black to the product line-up. In 1995 he would become the Manager of Industrial Design for the AS/400 Division the same year he became Director of Personal Systems Group Design. In 1999 Hill would lead the redesign of the IBM Netfinity Servers with Roland Alo and Brian Leonard.

Hill was involved in the design of ThinkPad as the Director of Design for the Personal Systems Group and later the Director of Market Research and Worldwide Intelligence for the IBM Personal Systems Group, incorporating the concept of "purposeful evolution" to the design of ThinkPad to make gradual improvements rather than a complete redesign. He became the Director of PC design for IBM, including ThinkPad design in 1995.

At IBM, Hill collaborated with Richard Sapper, John Karidis, Tom Hardy, Tomoyuki Takahashi and Kazuhiko Yamazaki, the latter being an industrial designer at IBM Yamato. With Sapper he worked on the T560 Monitor, NetVista X40/X41, ThinkPad A30, and NetVista X41 Articulated Arm. Hill would also utilize the NetVista design for the iCruiser prototype. With Karidis he worked on several prototype computers including an "origami like notebook" that allowed the user to move the screen higher like a desktop computer. He jointly hold several patents for computer design with Karidis, Sapper, Takahashi and Yamazaki. These included laptop computers such as the ThinkPad 570 (Yamazaki, Takahashi, Sapper and Hill) and ThinkPad 240 (Yamazaki, Nariaki Mieki and Hill). Hill also contributed to the design of the ThinkPad 600 by introducing chamfered edges, which by removing material from the corners and edges of the laptop, assisting with the perception of a thinner, sleeker device. This design technique is still used on modern ThinkPads.

In 2001, David's work on the NetVistia X40, ThinkPad 570 was showcased in the exhibit "Workspheres: design and contemporary work styles" at the Museum of Modern Art.

Hill worked on several features like the ThinkLight that integrated an LED in the top of the display bezel to illuminate the keyboard on a laptop. He was also responsible for the creation of the middle mouse button on ThinkPad computers that allowed for scrolling in horizontal and vertical directions. He also led the development of the TrackPoint caps that would replace the "cat tongue" and "eraser head" models known as the "golf tee" (developed in collaboration with Tomoyuki Takahashi)and "soft dome". David was also in charge of the design of the i Series notebooks.

=== 2005-2017: Lenovo ===
When Lenovo acquired IBM's PC division in 2005, Hill became Lenovo's executive director for worldwide corporate identity and design forming a design headquarters in Raleigh, North Carolina. Hill also founded and wrote entries for Lenovo's first blog "Design Matters" from 2005 to 2017. This was done to help build bridges between the design and engineering teams within the company, and give customers a closer look at the design process. Hill also used poll results and comments as customer feedback from the blog entries.

Hill led the design of several products such as Project Kodachi in June 2006 which would become the ThinkPad X300. He originally wanted the X300 to feature a "butterfly" keyboard like the ThinkPad 701c, referred to as "Bento-Fly" but it was ultimately dropped during development. Hill imagined other design elements such as having the "i" in the ThinkPad logo have a red LED on the lid of the laptop. This feature was later introduced on the ThinkPad SL500 and included on most ThinkPads moving forward. In 2008, he was named one of the 25 most influential people in mobile technology by Laptop Magazine.

David would continue to collaborate with Richard Sapper on the ThinkPad X300, Lenovo Skylight and the design of the ThinkPad X1 Carbon and ThinkPad Reserve Edition with Tomoyuki Takahashi.

In 2009, David became Chief Design Officer and Vice President of Experience Design until June 30, 2017.

For the 20th anniversary of ThinkPad, David Hill created a book about ThinkPad design titled ThinkPad Design: Spirit & Essence for the exhibit that took place at the Museum of Modern Art in 2012. In 2015, he was part of the American management team celebrating the ThinkPad's 100 million sales mark.David through the "Design Matters" blog would launch the idea of creating a "retro ThinkPad" which would be released as the 25th anniversary edition ThinkPad called the T25. The book he created for the 20th anniversary was updated and included with the T25.
