= Butterfly keyboard =

Butterfly keyboard may refer to keyboards used on specific laptop computer models:

- IBM ThinkPad 701
- MacBook
- MacBook Pro
- MacBook Air
