= ThinkPad 701 =

Subnotebook computer with foldout keyboard

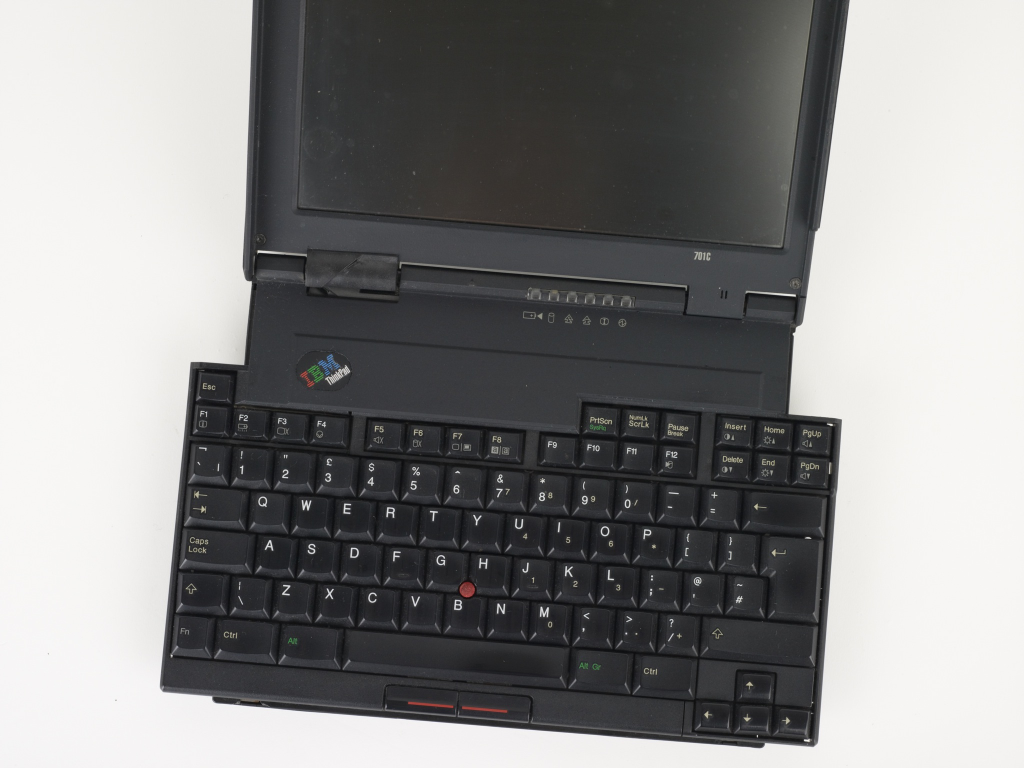
- Also known as: Butterfly
- Developer: Richard Sapper; John Karidis; Sam Lucente
- Manufacturer: IBM; Sharp Corporation (Note: For the LCD panel)
- Product family: ThinkPad
- Type: Subnotebook
- Released: March 6, 1995 (Note: 720MB disk versions were available from September 5, 1995.)
- Introductory price: $1,499 - $3,299
- Discontinued: December 21, 1995
- Operating system: Windows 3.11 (Note: 720MB models were delivered with OS/2 Warp 3.0 in dual-boot configuration.)
- CPU: i486 (DX2 or DX4) by Intel, 25–75 MHz
- Memory: 4–40 MB
- Storage: 360-720 MB
- Display: 640 x 480, DSTN or TFT LCD
- Graphics: Chips and Technologies CT-65545
- Sound: ESS 688, Yamaha OPL3
- Power: 30 Watts
- Dimensions: 9.7 × 7.9 × 1.7″
- Weight: 4.96 lb (2.25 kg)
- Predecessor: IBM ThinkPad 500
- Successor: IBM ThinkPad 760
- Made in: United States: Research Triangle Park, North Carolina (RTP Plant); Japan: Fujisawa, Kanagawa (Fujisawa Plant); United Kingdom: Greenock, Scotland (Greenock Plant)
- Website: pc.ibm.com at the Wayback Machine (archived December 19, 1996)

The IBM ThinkPad 701 is a subnotebook in the ThinkPad line by IBM. The 701 is colloquially known as the Butterfly due to its sliding keyboard, which was designed by John Karidis. It was developed from 1993 and sold from March 1995 until later that year and priced between $1,499 and $3,299. The 701 was the most sold laptop in 1995 and has received 27 design awards. It was based on either the DX2 or the DX4 version of the Intel i486, combined with the CT-65545 graphics chip. The 701Cs version used a DSTN display, while the 701C used a TFT LCD. It was pre-installed with Windows 3.11 and for the DX4 models also with OS/2 Warp 3.0. The 701 was discontinued because the keyboard design was no longer a necessity after screen sizes increased.

== Development ==
The 701 was a collaboration project between the manufacturing facility at the Research Triangle Park near Raleigh, North Carolina, United States and the development facility at Yamato, Kanagawa Prefecture, Japan. The concept of the keyboard was first developed as a photocopy of a keyboard in spring 1993. In the summer, a plexiglass prototype was developed. The decision to fund the notebook was made in the fall of 1993, with the introduction planned a year later. Because the process was delayed, it used the Intel 486 instead of the faster Pentium when it was released. The keyboard was designed by with John Karidis, Sam Lucente and Robert Tennant. Richard Sapper has been responsible for the overall ThinkPad design. Other contributors include Lawrence Stone, Michael King, Martin Tucker and Gerard McVicker.

The 701 was codenamed butterfly internally at IBM, and engineers also wanted to use this name as the official one. The IBM legal department did not allow the name of living creatures for products. It was part of the subnotebook series like the ThinkPad 500, but they did not want to attach the same name to this model due to bad sales of the previous 500 model. The 600 series was a reserved name, so they used the 700 series which was intended for the high-end models.

PCMag noted that the LCD manufacturing by Sharp Corporation was a departure from Display Technologies, Inc. for the 700 series.

== Release ==
IBM bought advertising space in major newspapers, in the lower corner or on the upper right side of a page. They only used an image of a butterfly without anything else. Days later, they added the IBM logo with a butterfly icon. A couple of days later, the text "Watch for the announcement" was added.

After the announcement, IBM received a legal threat about the usage of the name "butterfly" by someone known only as George, as it violated their company's trademark on a supercomputer product named Butterfly. IBM replied that they did not plan to use it as a brand name, and no legal action or further correspondence took place.

Initially, IBM failed to supply the demand for the 701.

Because of the high reward of the 701 design, model kits were developed so a souvenir version of the 701 could be made.

== Specifications ==
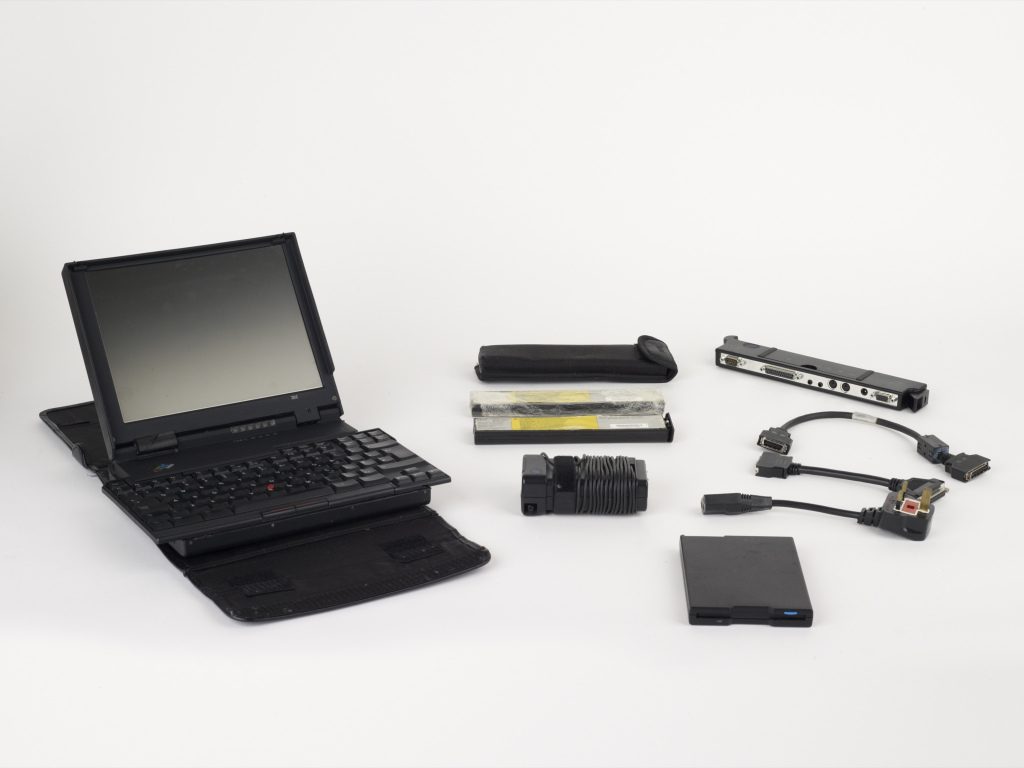
The IBM ThinkPad 701 with accessories

The subnotebook series was released in different variations, with either the Intel DX2 or Intel DX4, LCD with dual scan or TFT active matrix. They were sold with different disk sizes. They all contained the same graphics chips and preinstalled software, except for the DX4 versions which were dual booted with IBM OS/2. It was based on the AT bus and could be extended with a Dock II type. Pre-installed software included Lotus cc:Mail, Organizer, ScreenCam, PRODIGY, America Online, Video for Windows 1.1 Runtime and Audiofile TalkWorks. The operating system installed was IBM DOS 6.3, Windows 3.11, while DX4 machines included OS/2 Warp 3.0 in dual boot mode with selected BonusPack. The graphics processing unit (GPU) was a CT-65545, with 1MB DRAM by Chips and Technologies on VL-Bus 2.0. It supported an external SVGA display up to 1024x768 with 256 colors at 70 Hz.

Specifications
	701Cs					701C				
Display	VGA color 640x480, DSTN, 10.4", 65k colors, 20:1 contrast					VGA color, 640x480, TFT LCD, 65k colors, 100:1 contrast				
CPU	Intel DX2 50/25 MHz		Intel DX4 75/25 MHz			Intel DX2 50/25 MHz		Intel DX4 75/25 MHz		
HDD	360 MB	540 MB	360 MB	540 MB	720 MB	360 MB	540 MB	360 MB	540 MB	720 MB
Retail price	$2,499	$2,749	$1,499	$1,649	$1,799	$2,999	$3,299	$1,999	$2,149	$2,299

=== Keyboard ===
External videos
- Thinking Laterally ThinkPad 701c (1995) on YouTube (55 seconds)

Opening and closing a ThinkPad 701CS

The keyboard used in the 701 is officially known as the TrackWrite, but commonly known and code-named as the butterfly keyboard. The design allowed the 701 series to be both compact (when closed) and comfortable to use (when open), despite being just 24.6 cm (9.7 in) wide with a 26.4 cm (10.4 in) VGA LCD. The keyboard is split into two roughly right triangle pieces that slide as the laptop's lid is opened or closed. As the lid is opened both pieces slide out to the sides, followed by one piece sliding downward. The two halves mesh to form a keyboard 29.2 cm (11.5 in) wide which overhangs the sides of the laptop body. Conversely, as the lid is closed one piece slides back, then both slide inward until the keyboard can be covered by the lid. The movement of the keyboard is driven by a cam on the lid's hinge, so the motions of the keyboard parts are always synchronized with the movement of the lid.

== Reception ==
In a 1995 review of the 701C by InfoWorld the full-sized keyboard, large matrix screen and built-in multimedia features were positively noted. The nonstandard I/O ports were seen negatively. The ThinkPad 701 has received 27 design awards, including the "Good Design Award" from CES Innovation and "1995 Product of the year" in the subnotebook category from InfoWorld. Domus noted in a 2019 article that: "Even today, this portable PC amazes anyone who sees it open and close, and more than twenty years have gone by.". The 701C was the top selling laptop of 1995. Walt Mossberg considered it the most unusual and clever laptop he ever reviewed. The laptop is still popular with collectors, 26 years after its release.

According to John Karidis, the IBM ThinkPad 700 succeeded because of the large screen size and full-sized keyboard, while other companies cramped their keyboards and failed. Karidis observed that the limiting factor in the laptop size was the keyboard width and that the screen and keyboard surface were equal with different aspect ratios.

The laptop is being displayed in the design collection of the Museum of Modern Art in Manhattan, New York, Die Neue Sammlung in Munich, Germany and in the Computer History Museum. The ThinkPad 701 was briefly shown in 1995 James Bond film GoldenEye, Blood Diamond and Mission: Impossible.

== Discontinuation and later history ==
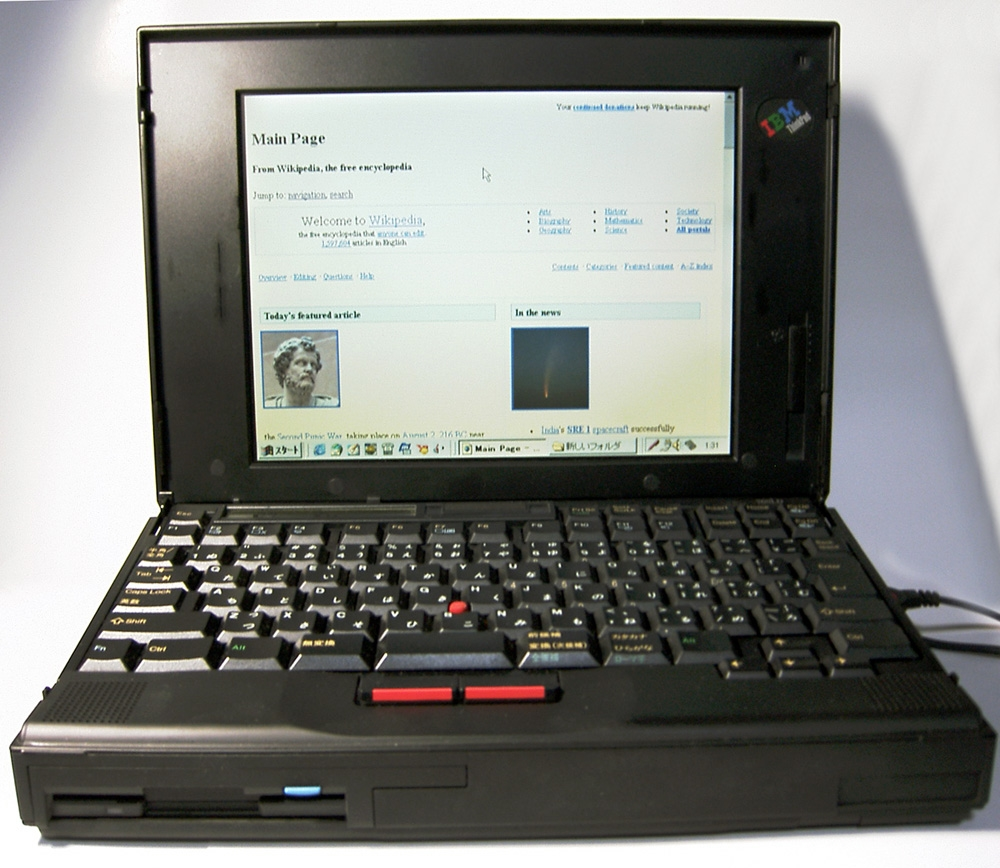
IBM ThinkPad 760LD

The 701 was withdrawn per December 21, 1995, which IBM announced a month before. This was due to newer laptop models containing larger screens, so the laptop could contain a full sized keyboard without a folding mechanism. Other companies were also moving to Pentium processors. The 701 series has been described as a product that had innovative features that were well received in the market, but the total package missed the competitive mark. A few months after the release of the 701, the ThinkPad 760 was released which is based on the original Intel Pentium processor.

For the 10th anniversary of ThinkPad in 2002, IBM Japan produced a 65% scale model kit of the 701. These were provided at corporate events or with a purchase of an IBM PC. In 2003, ZDNet reported that the IBM Design Center was experimenting with new laptop models that included a butterfly keyboard. David Hill, designer at IBM and Lenovo, stated that he tried to bring back the butterfly design, but was not able to do so. In 2021, Lenovo has filed a patent for a keyboard that is similar to the one used in the 701.

In 2014 it was reported by Hackaday that it was possible to desolder the original Intel DX4 and replace it with a faster Am5x86. In 2023, hacker Karl Buchka retrofitted the mainboard of the Framework Laptop into the 701. The keyboard is controlled using the QMK firmware on a Teensy.

== See also ==
- Ergonomic keyboard
- Samsung Sens 810, a laptop with a split ergonomic keyboard
- List of computer size categories
- List of IBM products

Preceded by IBM ThinkPad 500	IBM ThinkPad 701	Succeeded by IBM ThinkPad 760
