= Lucente =

Lucente is an Italian surname. Notable people with this surname include:

- Iluminado Lucente (1883–1960), Filipino writer
- Sam Lucente (born 1958), American designer
- Vito Lucente (born 1971), Italian DJ
