= Samsung Sens 810 =

Notebook computer by Samsung

Sens 810
- Developer: Samsung Electronics
- Manufacturer: Samsung Electronics
- Product family: Sens
- Type: Laptop (notebook)
- Released: July 1996; 30 years ago
- CPU: Intel Pentium at 100, 120, 133, or 150 MHz
- Memory: 8–40 MB RAM (EDO DRAM)
- Storage: 1.3–2.1 GB HDD
- Display: 11.3-inch color DSTN LCD; 12.1-inch color TFT LCD
- Weight: 9.6 pounds (4.4 kg)

The Sens 810 is a notebook computer released by Samsung Electronics in 1996 in the Sens line. It was the first notebook with a split ergonomic keyboard, with the opening angle able to be adjusted with a slider. It received mostly positive reviews from technology critics.

== Specifications ==
The Sens 810 measures 11.7 by 9.7 by 2.5 inches (29.7 by 24.6 by 6.4 cm) and weighs 9.6 pounds (4.4 kg) with the internal power supply and external power brick or 7.7 pounds (3.5 kg) without. The notebook initially came in three different configurations. The low-tier model came with a 100 MHz Pentium processor, 8 MB of RAM, a 11.3-inch color DSTN LCD, a 4×-speed removable internal CD-ROM drive, and a 1.3 GB HDD. The middle-tier model came with a 120 MHz Pentium, 16 MB of RAM, a 12.1-inch color TFT LCD, the same CD-ROM drive, and either a 1.3 GB or a 2.1 GB HDD. The high-tier model came with a 133 MHz Pentium and the same specifications as the middle-tier model but with the addition of an internal 28.8 kbps modem. This modem later came standard on all models. Samsung later offered a model with a 150 MHz Pentium. All models sport EDO DRAM, expandable to 40 MB.

All models feature PCI-based Intel chipsets, the 32-bit Cirrus Logic CL-GD7543 graphics chip, a Sound Blaster 16–compatible sound chip, stereo speakers, and a built-in microphone. The internal CD-ROM drive resides in a carrier that plugs into a bay on the machine. This bay can also accommodate a floppy disk drive, a second lithium-ion battery pack, or a TV tuner module, allowing the Sens 810 to receive analog television broadcasts. The Sens 810 is also capable of outputting NTSC or PAL video via composite; it was one of very few notebooks available at the time with this feature. The Sens 810 additionally has two PC Card slots accommodating either one Type III card or two Type II cards, as well as internal serial and parallel ports, a combination PS/2 mouse and keyboard port, a game port, and an IrDA port for wireless communication.

Unique to the Sens 810 is its split ergonomic keyboard, the first of any on a notebook computer. The opening angle is able to be adjusted with a slider, allowing the user to closely align the keyboard according to the natural alignment of their wrists. The design elicited comparisons to the Microsoft Natural Keyboard and the ThinkPad 701's TrackWrite keyboard (the so-called "butterfly keyboard"). The latter of which, while not ergonomic, was likewise split down the middle in order to facilitate a complex mechanism that allowed the keyboard to extend past the footprint of the ThinkPad's chassis. Samsung paired the keyboard of the Sens 810 with a GlidePoint touchpad, manufactured by Alps Electric.

All models in the Sens 810 shipped with Windows 95. It was reportedly incompatible with Windows NT 4.0.

== Development ==
Samsung Electronics designed the Sens 810 in the latter half of 1995. The Sens 810 was helmed by Scott Bower, vice president of sales and marketing for Samsung's computer systems division. Samsung poached Bower from IBM; he was one of the principals behind ThinkPad line. Rumors of its development circulated in the final week of that year, and it was first unveiled to the public in February 1996. Industry analysts considered Samsung behind the curve in the PC industry while the Sens 810 was being developed. It was ultimately released in July 1996 with a base price of $2,999 (equivalent to $6,156 in 2025).

== Reception ==
PC Magazine's Bruce Brown called the Sens 810 performant as a whole but found the build quality mediocre and the Cirrus Logic graphics chip subpar on account of its limited VRAM. Marty Jerome of sister publication PC/Computing called it a good value was impressed with its specifications but opined that "all these great pieces don't necessarily make a stunning whole", noting the notebook's heft and the relatively modest adjustability of the ergonomic keyboards as points against it. In a separate roundup of eleven notebooks, Jerome found that the Sens 810's had the best battery life at 6 hours and 48 minutes and ranked third in graphical performance. John D. Ruley of Windows Magazine called the TFT LCD of the higher-end Sens 810 "outstanding, among the best I've used on a portable". Like Marty, Ruley found the notebook heavy. Computer Shopper's Rick Broida, in a longform review, concluded that the Sens 810 "does many things right, but it's marred by its heavy travel weight, lackluster video performance, and poorly designed mouse buttons. If you can live with those shortcomings, you'll find the Samsung a marvelously comfortable notebook that's as easy on the eyes as it is on the hands. It's inches away from being our highest recommendation".

Julie Cohen of Electronic Engineering Times gave the notebook a negative review, writing that the notebook had "flimsy construction" with easily broken port doors and that its performance under Windows 95 was unstable with many instances of freezes and glitches with playing sound files. She also noted that the low-end model's 8 MB of RAM was "barely enough to run Windows 95 and the rest of the software included with the computer".
