= ThinkPad X300 =

Lenovo ThinkPad X300
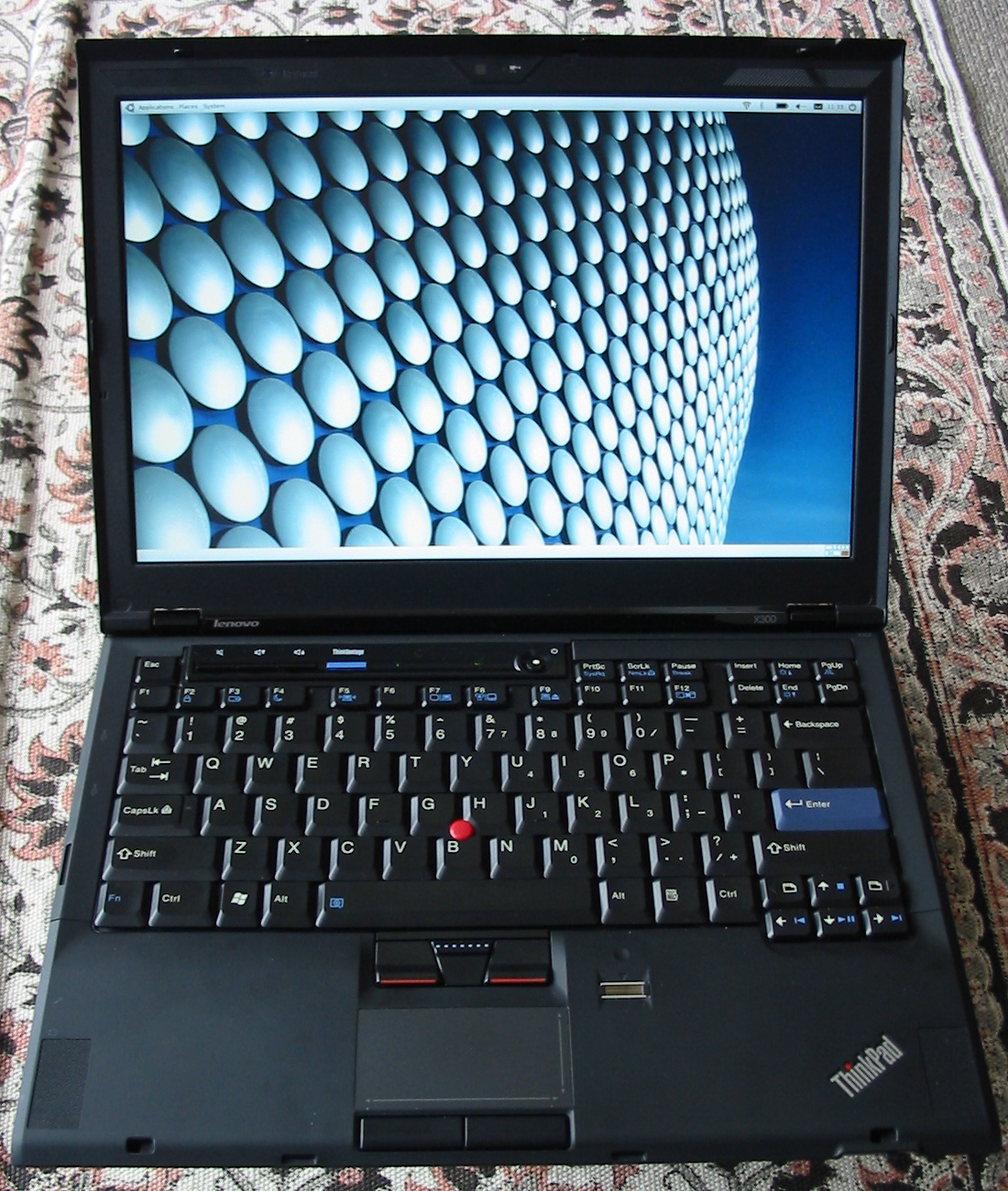
- Developer: Lenovo
- Manufacturer: Lenovo
- Product family: X Family
- Type: Portable Computer
- Released: 2008
- Operating system: Windows Vista
- CPU: Intel Core 2 Duo LV7100 (1.2GHz)
- Memory: 4GB PC2-5300 DDR2
- Storage: 64GB Solid State
- Removable storage: CD-RW/DVDRW
- Display: 13.3" WXGA+ TFT Display
- Graphics: Intel GS965 (Intel GMA X3100)
- Input: Three USB 2.0 ports External DB-15 monitor Audio ports External stereo speakers or headphone Microphone-in Built-in RJ-45 connectors for LAN connections
- Dimensions: Width: 318mm (12.5 in) Depth: 231mm (9.09 in) Height: 18.6-23.4mm (0.73 in to 0.92 in)
- Weight: Weight: Starting at 1.54 kg (3.4 lb)
- Successor: Lenovo ThinkPad X301

The Lenovo ThinkPad X300 is a discontinued laptop from the ThinkPad line that was manufactured by Lenovo.

== Development ==
During development, the laptop was codenamed Kodachi after the Japanese sword of the same name. The design of the X300 was led by David Hill.

== Specifications ==
All ThinkPad X300s were shipped with Windows Vista Installed and were fitted with an Intel Core 2 Duo Processor. The laptop had 3 USB ports.

== Reception ==
The laptop was generally well received. Notebookcheck noted that the X300 was the notebook that proved that Lenovo was a worthy successor to IBM. The X300 is the first ThinkPad without IBM branding. Reviewers noted that it was lightweight and able to maintain an optical drive, which allowed it to be compared favourably to other models like the X200. It was often compared to the Apple MacBook Air for being thin, light and using solid state storage. These comparisons led to the X300 being placed into an interoffice mailing envelope like the MacBook Air and led to the creation of a commercial showcasing this comparison. The X300 was noted for being an expensive device with base configurations starting at US$2,476.

The X300 was featured as the coverstory of the February 2008 issue of Business Week Magazine. It was also the primary subject in the book "The race for perfect: inside the quest to design the ultimate portable computer" by Steve Hamm.
