= IBM Leapfrog =

Tablet computer prototype

- Manufacturer: IBM
- Type: Tablet computer
- Website: Richardsapperdesign.com

The IBM Leapfrog is a tablet computer prototype by IBM. It was designed by Sam Lucente and Richard Sapper. It is part of the collection of the Museum of Modern Art. It won the Compasso d'Oro in 1994. When the tablet computer was announced, it was mistakenly described by design magazines as a product that could be bought.
