= Sam Lucente =

American industrial designer

- Born: 1958 (age 67–68)
- Education: University of Cincinnati
- Occupation: Industrial designer
- Notable work: IBM Leapfrog; IBM ThinkPad 701

Samuel "Sam" Lucente (born 1958) is an industrial designer.

== Education ==
Lucente studied at the University of Cincinnati.

== Career ==
He worked for IBM between 1981 and 1996. He was responsible for the design of computers, including the Leapfrog computer and the IBM ThinkPad 701, along with Richard Sapper. This work is part of the collection of the Museum of Modern Art in New York City. From 1996 until 1998 he worked at Netscape. From 2003 until 2010 he was the VP of design at Hewlett Packard. At HP, he proposed using a single logo on their products to save costs. He has been a witness in the Apple Inc. v. Samsung Electronics Co. lawsuit.
