= ThinkPad Anniversary Edition 25 =

Laptop model manufactured by Lenovo

Lenovo ThinkPad Anniversary Edition 25
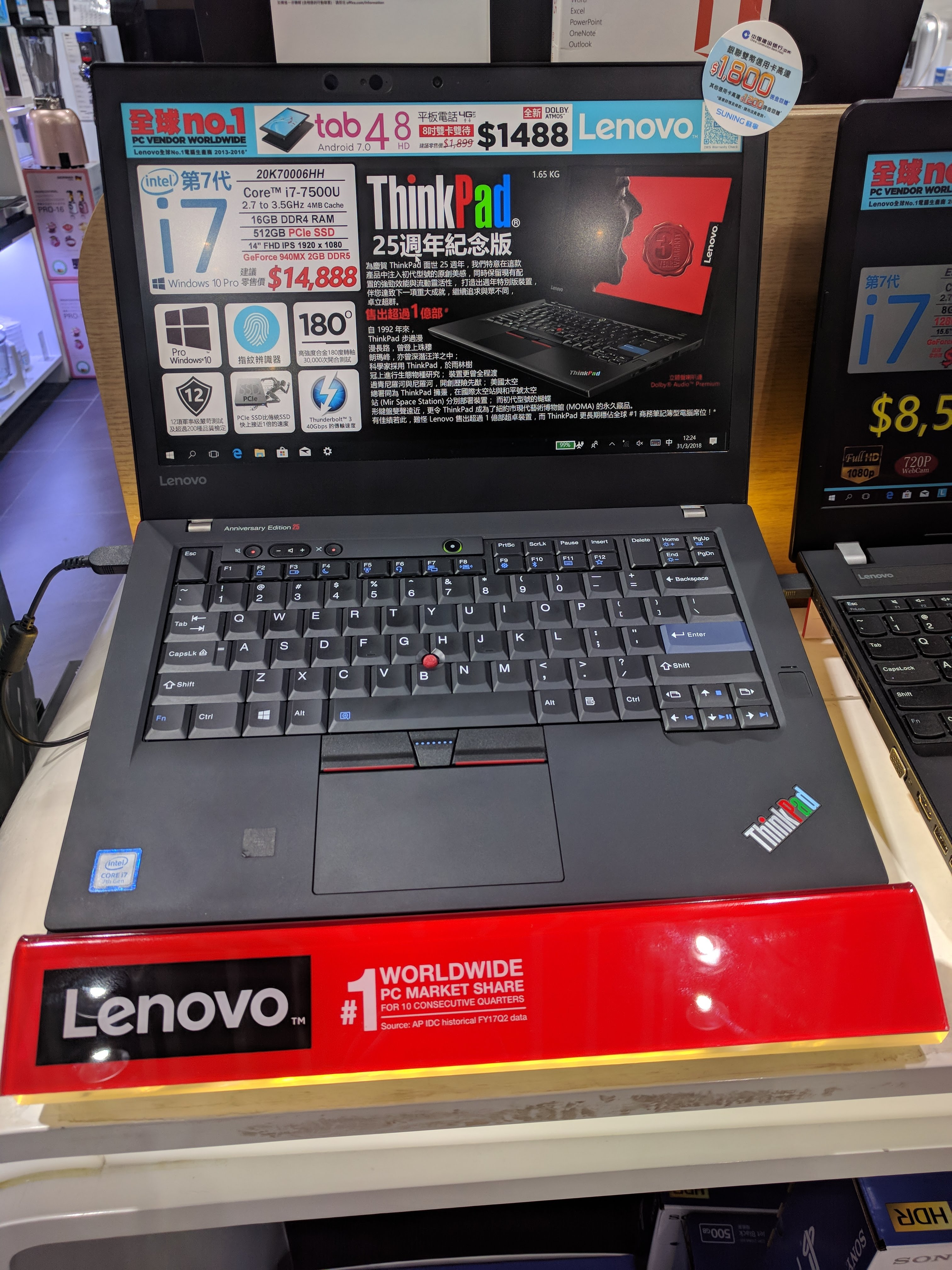
- Also known as: ThinkPad 25th anniversary edition
- Developer: Lenovo
- Manufacturer: Lenovo
- Type: Classic Business Laptop
- Released: 2017
- Introductory price: $1,899.00
- Operating system: Windows 10 Pro
- CPU: 7th Gen Intel Core i7-7500U (2.7Ghz, 4MB)
- Memory: 16 GB DDR4
- Storage: 512 GB PCIe SSD
- Display: 14" FHD antiglare (1920 x 1080) IPS multitouch
- Graphics: NVIDIA GeForce 940MX 2GB GDDR5
- Sound: Stereo speakers with Dolby Audio Premium
- Input: Match-on-Chip Touch fingerprint reader Windows Hello with facial recognition Classic ThinkPad Keyboard With Blue Enter Key; Special edition ThinkPad logo
- Camera: 720p HD IR Camera with dual array (noise cancelling) microphones
- Touchpad: Yes
- Connectivity: 3 x USB 3.0; 1 x USB-C with Intel Thunderbolt 3; 1 x 3.5 mm Combo Audio Jack; 1 x HDMI; 1 x RJ45 Gigabit Ethernet; Mechanical docking 4-in-1 Card Reader (SD, MMC, SDHC, SDXC); Smart Card Reader
- Power: 48 Whr up to 13.9 hours of battery life
- Dimensions: 336.6 mm x 232.5 mm x 19.95 mm 13.25" x 9.15" x .79"
- Weight: 3.48 lbs / 1.6 kg

The Lenovo ThinkPad Anniversary Edition 25 is a laptop manufactured by Lenovo for the 25th anniversary of the ThinkPad line. The laptop is also known as the ThinkPad 25.

== Development ==
The idea for what would become the ThinkPad 25th anniversary edition was first shared on Lenovo's "Design Matters" blog in June 2015 by David Hill showing renders of a "Retro ThinkPad." News outlets discussed these posts emphasizing that it was not yet guaranteed it would be built without a certain threshold of interest. Several subsequent posts on the blog asked readers to answer poll questions to gauge interest and features they wanted to see on this possible design. One of these surveys was around which keyboard should be included on the retro device with an overwhelming majority desiring the traditional 7-row keyboard over the newer 6-row keyboard. Users were divided on keyboard illumination being the ThinkLight or backlit keys. A 14.1" screen was ultimately preferred by respondents. There was little desire for an optical drive to be included and USB A 3.0 ports were the highest priority in I/O. The tri-colored ThinkPad logo that was ultimately included was not the first choice with customers preferring the modern all silver logo. The rubber dome TrackPoint cap was preferred by customers with all three (rough, golf tee and dome) being a close second. On June 21, 2017, the ThinkPad 25th anniversary edition was officially confirmed on the "Design Matters" blog. Leaked images showcased the hardware in September 2017 before it officially was made available for purchase in limited quantities on October 5, 2017.

== Hardware ==
This model was based on a ThinkPad T470 model and has a limited compatibility of case parts.

It came packaged with several extras such as additional TrackPoint caps and a special 25th anniversary edition of book ThinkPad Design: Spirit & Essence written by David Hill.

== Reception ==
The 25th anniversary edition was released in limited quantities in select countries. Only one configuration was made available for purchase. Reviews were overall favorable. Some reviewers recognized that not everything that customers wanted ended up in the final product such as the ThinkLight and the limitations of it being based on a T470 chassis. Reviewers noted that the machine primarily existed to celebrate the 25th anniversary of ThinkPad and was not the most powerful option available within the ThinkPad lineup, with the classic keyboard being a huge draw. Reviewers acknowledge the draw of the nostalgic design while recommending the standard T470 for regular business customers. The discrete graphics option had limited availability in the standard T470 model which led some reviewers to mistakenly state it was exclusive to the anniversary edition.
