= ThinkPad 560 =

Computer model by IBM

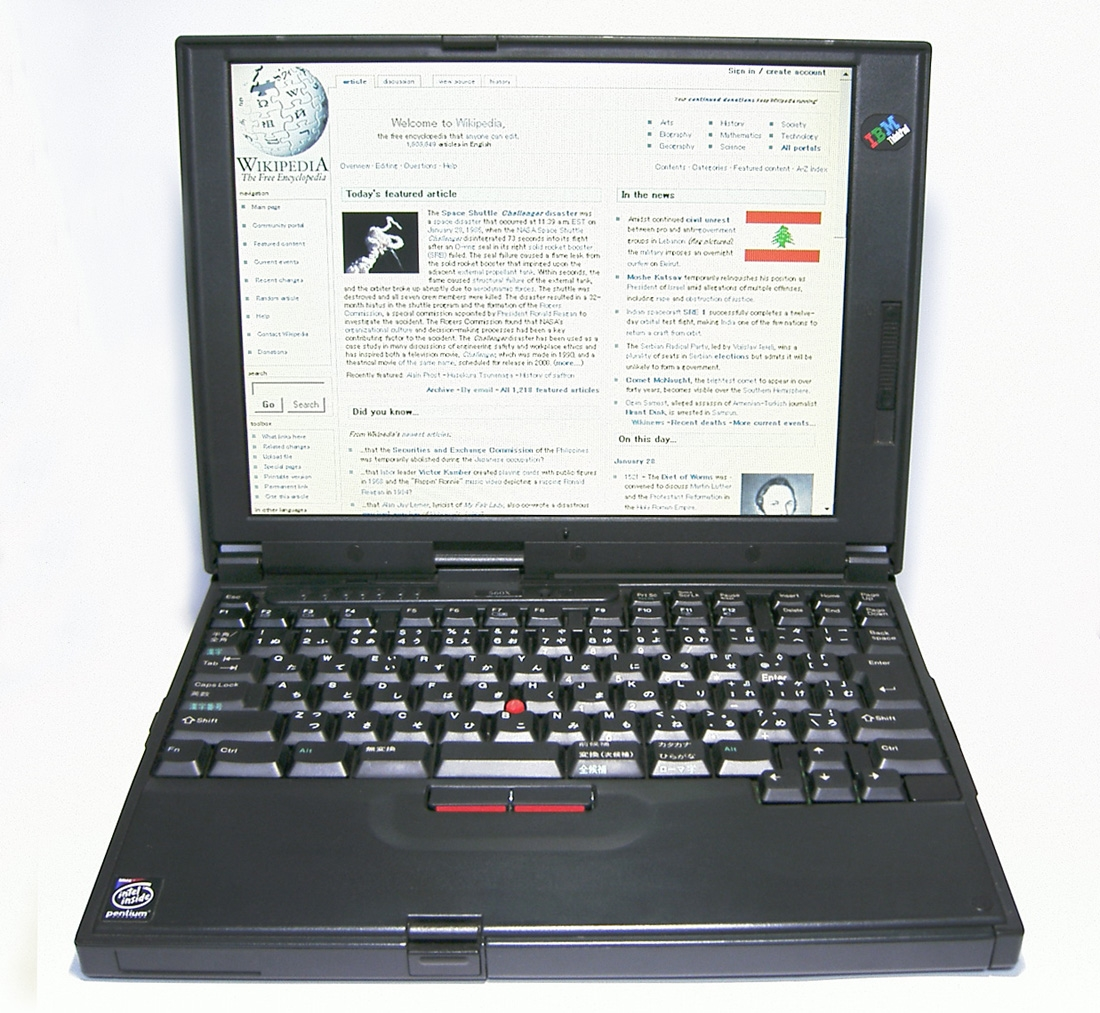
- Manufacturer: IBM
- Released: 1996
- Discontinued: 1999
- Website: pc.ibm.com at the Wayback Machine (archived 1996-11-21)

External videos
- Thin, No Compromise ThinkPad 560 (1997) on YouTube (46 seconds)

The IBM ThinkPad 560 is a notebook series from the ThinkPad line by IBM. It has been argued that the ThinkPad 560 was the first ultraportable notebook.

== Models ==
	560	560E	560X	560Z
CPU	Pentium 100, 120, 133MHz	Pentium 150, 166MHz	Pentium 200, 233MHz MMX	Pentium II Mobile 233, 300MHz
HDD	2.1 GB	2.1 GB	2.1-4.0 GB	4.0-6.4 GB
RAM	8 MB, max. 40 MB 60 ns, non-parity, 3.3 volt, 144-pin EDO	16 MB, max. 80 MB 70 ns, non-parity, 3.3 volt, 144-pin EDO	32 MB, max. 96 MB 60 ns, non-parity, 3.3 volt, 144-pin EDO	32 MB, max. 96 MB /64 MB, max. 128 MB 60 ns, non-parity, 3.3 volt, 144-pin EDO
Graphics	Trident Cyber9382, 1 MB RAM, PCI		NeoMagic MagicGraph128XD, 2 MB RAM, PCI	
Display	11.3" Dual Scan SVGA 256 colors /12.1" TFT SVGA 64k colors	11.3" Dual Scan SVGA 64k colors /12.1" TFT SVGA 64k colors	12.1" HPA SVGA 232k colors /12.1" TFT SVGA 262k colors	12.1" TFT SVGA 16 million colors
Audio 16Bit	ESS1688		CS4237B	
Dimensions	297 x 222 x 31 mm			
Weight	1.86 - 1.87 kg		1.9 kg	1.88 - 1.89 kg

== Reception ==
The laptop won the iF Product Design Award in 1997 for the product discipline. A review by ZDNet considered the ThinkPad 560X a good desktop replacement if it was combined with a port replicator.
