= ThinkPad 500 =

- Made in: United States

The IBM ThinkPad 500 is a subnotebook from the ThinkPad series released by IBM in 1993.

== History ==
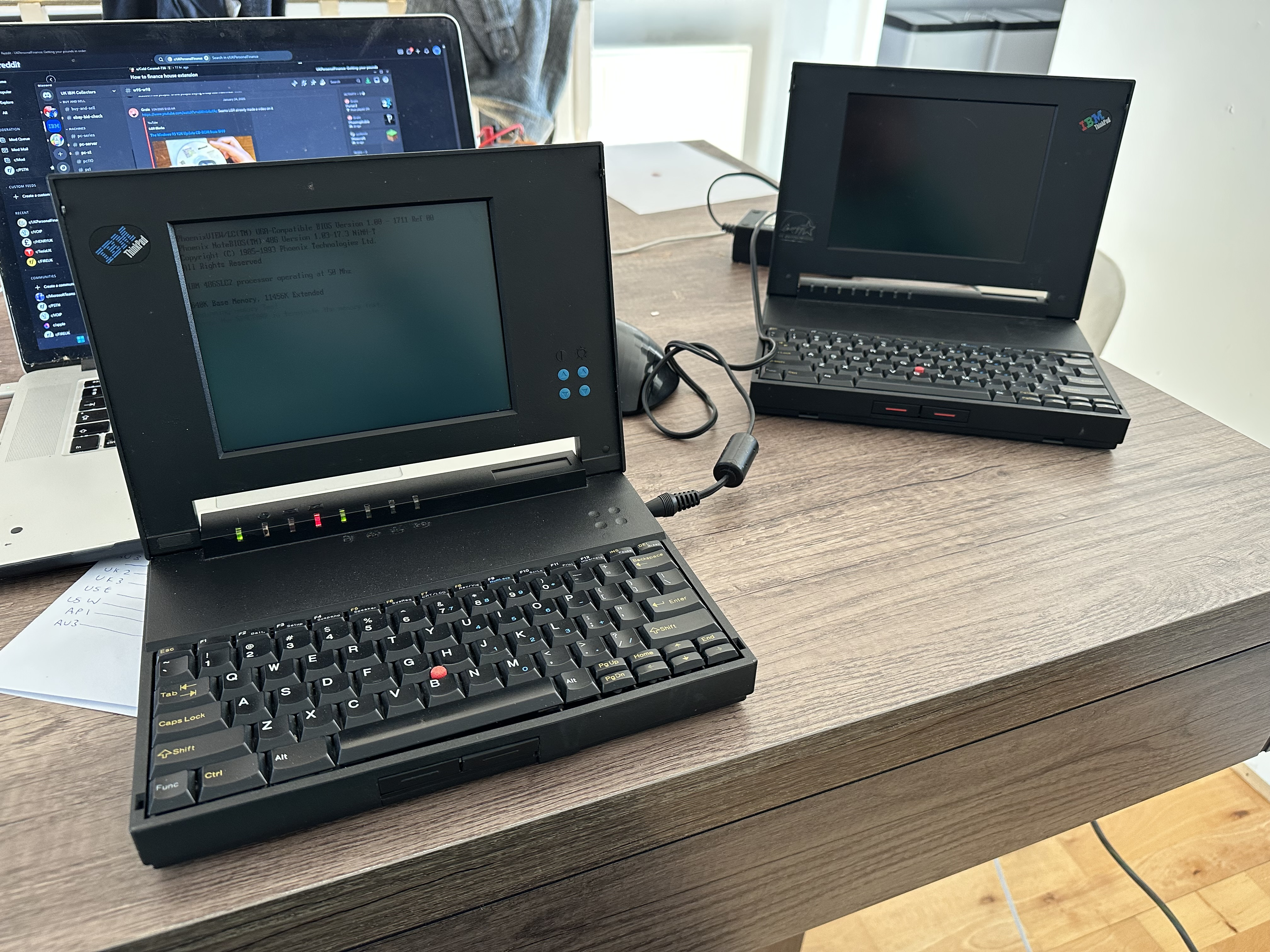
IBM Thinkpad 500 (left) and 510 (right).

The ThinkPad 500 (type 2603) was announced on 16 June 1993. It was the first subnotebook by IBM, made and registered with the FCC by their then-recent spin-off, Lexmark.

The next subnotebook by IBM was the IBM ThinkPad 701 series, which John Karidis influenced after using a 500 and feeling the keyboard experience could be improved by making it wider than the screen.

It was announced at the same time as the IBM ThinkPad 350. The New York Times noted that IBM challenged companies like Zeos, Dell, Zenith Data Systems and Hewlett-Packard who developed computers in the same class as the 500.

The ThinkPad 500 has a Lexbook counterpart called Lexmark SE10 (codename "Enchilada"). The main difference is that instead of using a TrackPoint, its keyboard has a mouse-key button.

The ThinkPad 500 was the earliest known IBM portable computer to use an IBM Model M6-1 buckling sleeve keyboard assembly, a minor revision of the original Model M6 and descendant of the IBM PS/2 Model L40 SX's Model M3. M6 and M6-1 were used on many early IBM (and all Lexmark) laptops and were even produced for other companies like AST, Apple and Tadpole.

== Specifications ==
- 50 MHz 486SLC2
- Cirrus Logic WD90C26 Video chipset
- 7.24" monochrome STN display with 256-shade graphics and a maximum resolution of 640x480
- 1 x PCMCIA Slot
- 1 x 3.5" external floppy drive
- 85 or 170mb Seagate Caviar hard drive
- 2.5 hour battery
- 12mb of RAM
- Windows 3.1 and IBM PC DOS 5.02
- PC Speaker for Sound
- VGA monitor out, parallel/serial ports
- Came with an external floppy drive included

== Reception ==
InfoWorld regarded the ThinkPad 500 as a bit too small for comfort.

PC World awarded the ThinkPad 500 the "Best Buy - #1 Value Mobile PC" in September 1994.

== Successor ==
In March 1994 the ThinkPad 510 was announced, which contains the 486 DLC by IBM and a 7.7" colour display.

The ThinkPad 510 looks very similar to the 500, but with notable differences in design being a colour "IBM" logo indicating the use of a colour LCD and that the 500's blue brightness and contrast buttons have been moved to 'hot keys' on the keyboard.

The 510 also has a single, multifunction port expander on the back to connect an additional module which provides peripheral connectivity, whereas the 500 simply has a Parallel, PS/2 and floppy-drive connector on the back.
