= John Karidis =

- Born: April 14, 1958; Pittsburgh, Pennsylvania
- Died: March 5, 2012 (aged 53)
- Occupation: Industrial designer
- Known for: Butterfly keyboard of the IBM ThinkPad 701

John Karidis (Born, Pittsburgh PA, April 14, 1958 - Died, New York, March 5, 2012) was a Greek-American mechanical engineer, inventor, and an Emeritus Distinguished Engineer at the IBM T.J. Watson Research Center. He graduated with BS, MS & PhD, (1976-1983) in Mechanical Engineering from Penn State University.

John Karidis was an inventor with 83 U.S. patents granted to date. His list of patents include various inventions on computer user interfaces, thermal solutions, printing devices, orthopedic devices, and computer memory systems.

Operation of the ThinkPad 701CS keyboard

John Karidis was best known for designing the butterfly keyboard of the IBM ThinkPad 701. The unusual patented design had two jigsaw puzzle like interlocking pieces which were tucked in the laptop when the display lid was closed. Then, the keyboard would fold out horizontally to make a wider keyboard when the display lid was opened. The "Butterfly" laptop attracted much attention and became an instant classic when it was first introduced in 1995. It is being displayed in the permanent collection of the Museum of Modern Art in Manhattan (MoMA), New York. It has also been used by James Bond in the film GoldenEye.

IBM did not continue the Butterfly keyboard after the ThinkPad 701 model. John Karidis told in a 2001 interview that "The butterfly keyboard was no longer necessary, because people moved to larger displays. Where the butterfly approach makes sense is where you want the largest keyboard possible in combination with an 8-inch or 10-inch display." However, 17 years after its introduction to market, there are still calls for bringing the Butterfly keyboard back to netbooks which suffer from small keyboards.

Another of John Karidis inventions was one of the world's fastest robotic probing systems, called the "Hummingbird minipositioner". This robot can probe and test 40-100 contacts per second on very fine geometry multi-chip modules. The design is used as an exemplar of engineering and robotic discipline in courses at Johns Hopkins University, the University of Michigan, and McGill University.

Another of John Karidis inventions was the "Start-Gap Wear Leveling" method and the highly cited paper which was awarded the 2021 NVMW Persistent Impact Prize in recognition of its contribution to wear-leveling techniques for persistent memories: "an elegant, efficient, and easily-implemented solution to the wear-leveling problem and has become the de-facto standard wear-leveling technique in low-latency non-volatile memory research."

Penn State University has established the Dr. John P. Karidis Department Head's Award for Research Achievement in Mechanical Engineering. The award recognizes mechanical engineering students who have made important contributions in advancing research in his or her selected areas of study.
