= German Design Council =

German foundation

- Rat für Formgebung
- Formation: Founded 1953
- Legal status: foundation
- Location: Frankfurt am Main, Germany
- Leader: Lutz Dietzold (CEO)
- Website: https://www.gdc.de

The German Design Council (German: Rat für Formgebung) is a non-profit organisation with the aim of representing the interests of German companies focussed on design. The foundation has more than 300 members today in industry, design, associations and institutions.

== History ==
The German Design Council was founded following harsh criticism of how German post-war products were presented at the New York export trade show in 1949. In accordance with a motion by the Social Democratic Party (SPD), the German Bundestag decided to create an independent council for design development. This council was founded in 1953 as the 'Rat für Formgebung', a nonprofit foundation with the explicit task of supporting German industry in developing design as an economic and cultural factor. Since then, the council has carried out its duties by organising exhibitions, competitions and conferences, producing publications and providing strategic consulting. The logo of the German Design Council was created in 1960 by the graphic designer Anton Stankowski (1906–1998). The German Design Council pursues a design approach focused on creating cultural and economic value. As formulated in the foundation resolution of the German Bundestag, the meeting of the foundation members functions as a platform for communication among everyone involved in the design process.

== Activities (selection) ==
- From 1969 to 2001: Gute Form (Good Design), presented on behalf of the German Federal Ministry for Economics
- From 2002 to 2012: Designpreis der Bundesrepublik Deutschland (German Design Award), presented on behalf of the German Federal Ministry for Economics
- Since 2012: German Design Awards
- Since 2013: Iconic Awards
- Since 2016: German Brand Awards
- Since 2009: German Brand and Design Congress
- Library
