= Richard Sapper =

German industrial designer (1932–2015)

- Born: 30 May 1932; Munich, Germany
- Died: 31 December 2015 (aged 83)
- Education: Ludwig-Maximilians-Universität München
- Occupation: Industrial designer
- Awards: Cross of Merit; Compasso d'Oro (11 awards); Lucky Strike Designer Award; Honorary Fellow of the Royal Society of Arts; Doctor of Fine Arts, North Carolina State University; Lifetime Achievement Award, German Design Council

Richard Sapper (30 May 1932 – 31 December 2015) was a German industrial designer who was based in Milan for much of his career. He is considered to be one of the most influential figures of post-war design. His products typically feature a combination of technical innovation, simplicity of form, and an element of wit and surprise.

Sapper received numerous awards and distinctions, including 11 Compasso d'Oro awards, the Raymond Loewy Foundation's Lucky Strike Designer Award, and the German Order of Merit. Examples of his work are in museums such as the Victoria and Albert and Design Museum in London, the Pompidou Center in Paris, the ADI Design Museum in Milan, and the Museum of Modern Art in New York – which has over 17 of his designs in its collection.

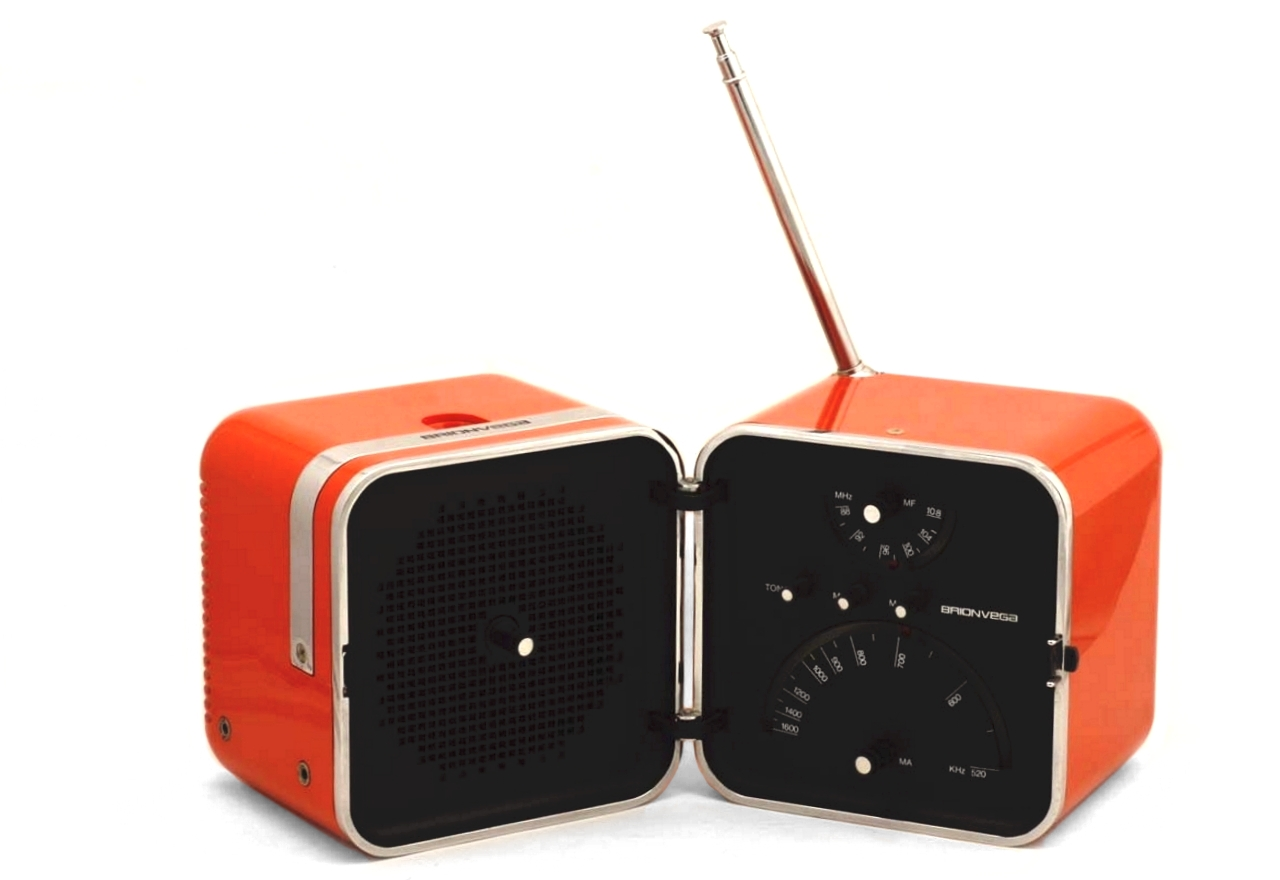
TS 502 radio designed for Brionvega (Museum of science and technology, Milan)

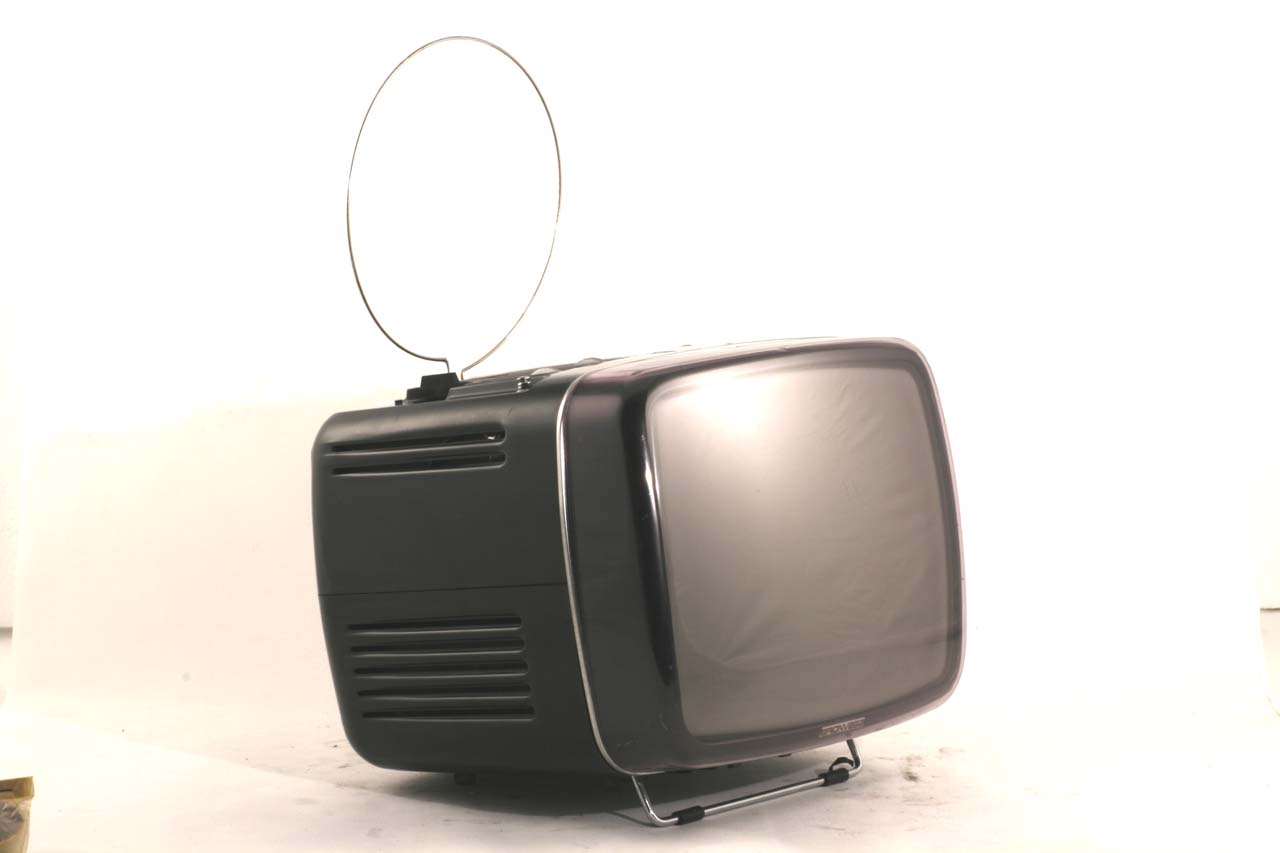
Doney television designed for Brionvega (Museum of science and technology, Milan)

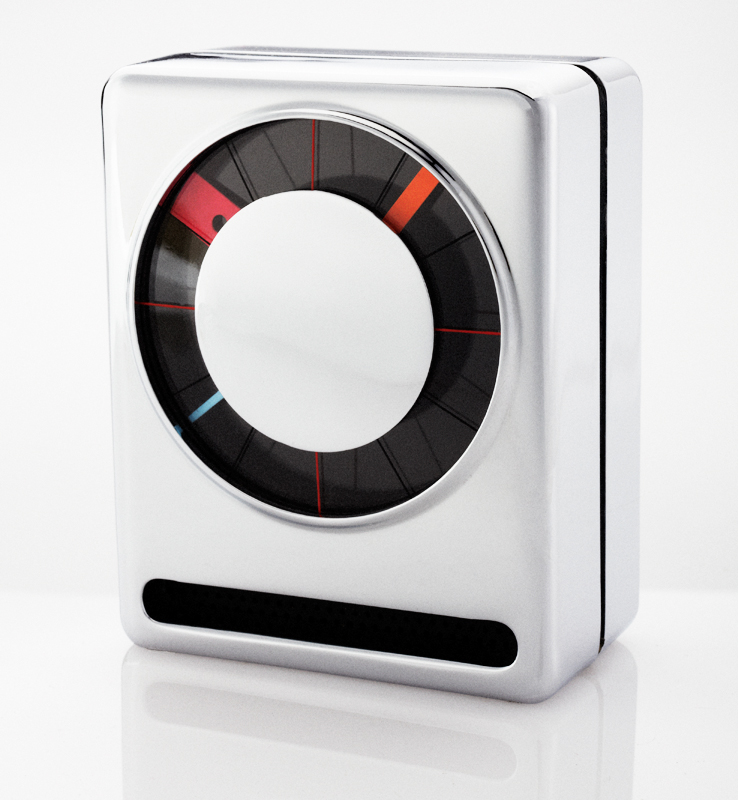
Sandwich Clock designed for Ritz-Italora

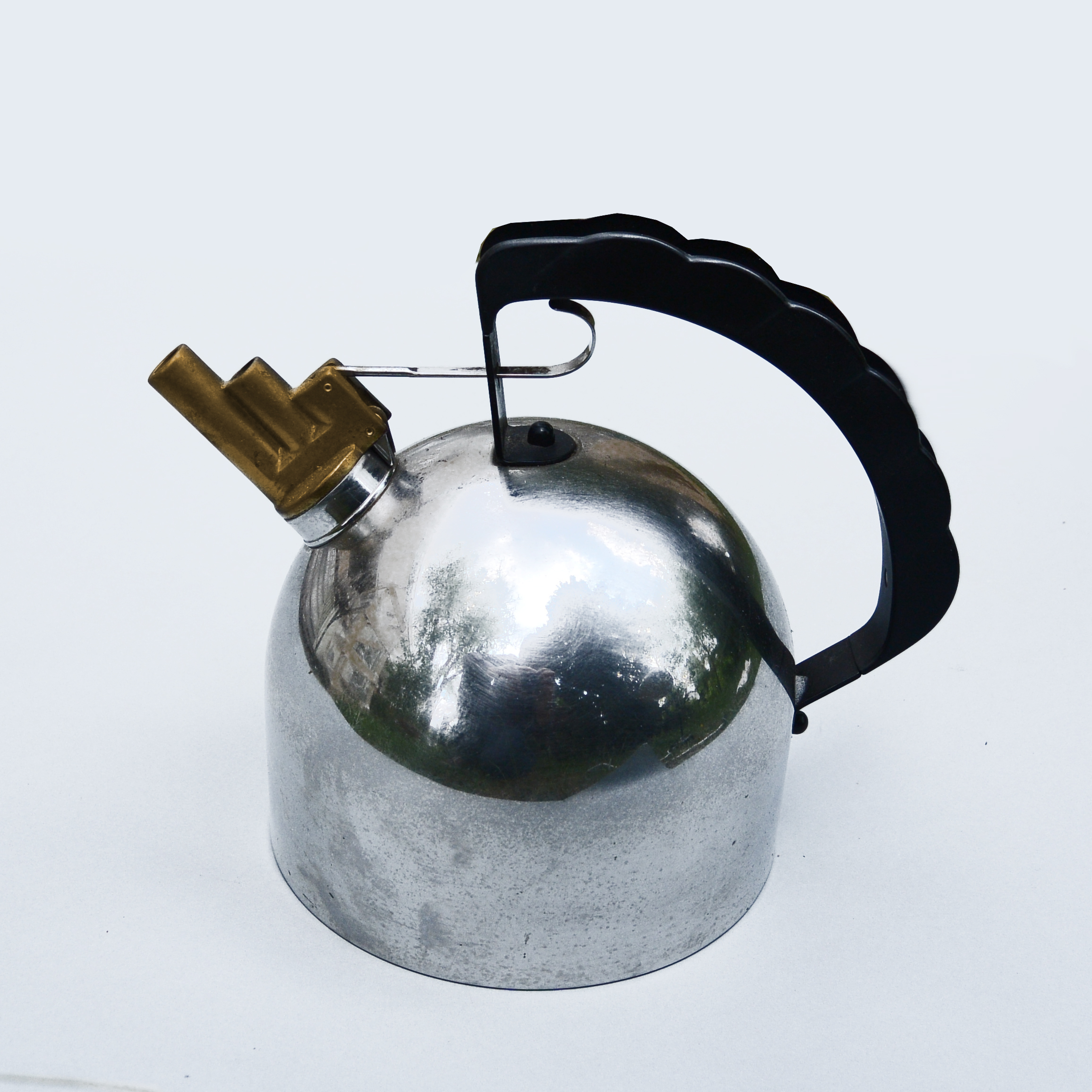
Bollitore kettle designed for Alessi

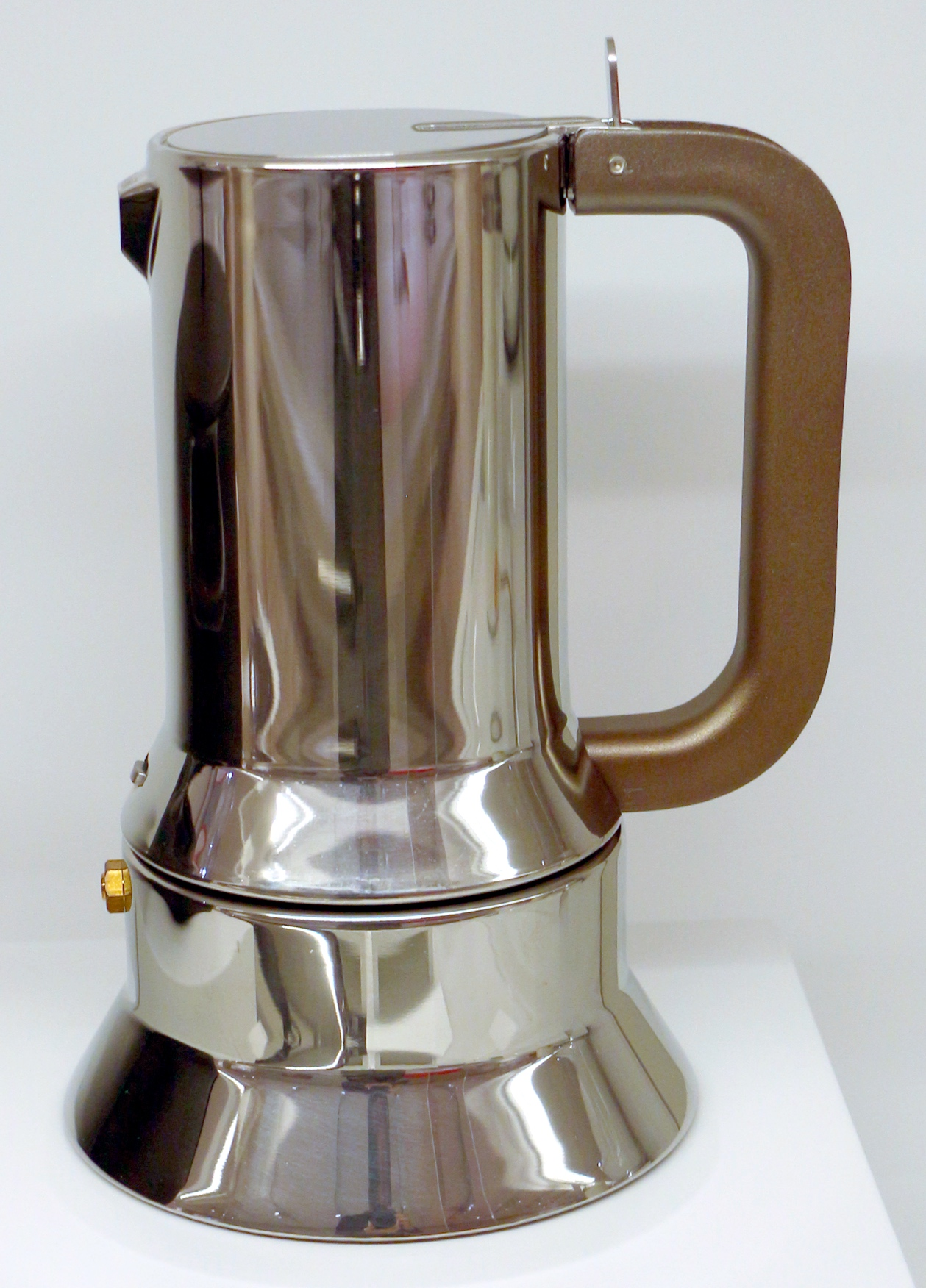
9090 coffee maker designed for Alessi

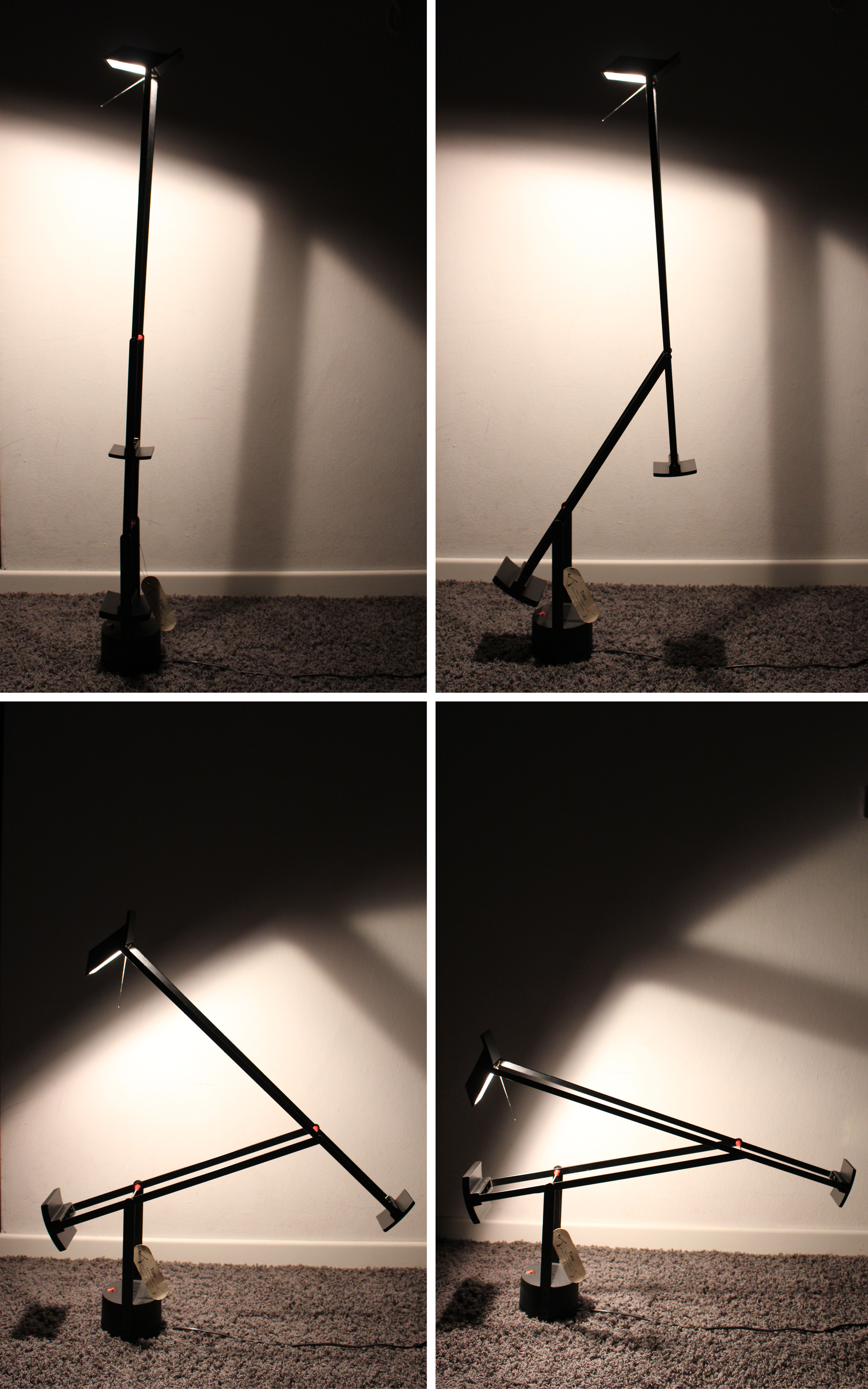
Tizio lamp designed for Artemide (showing articulation)

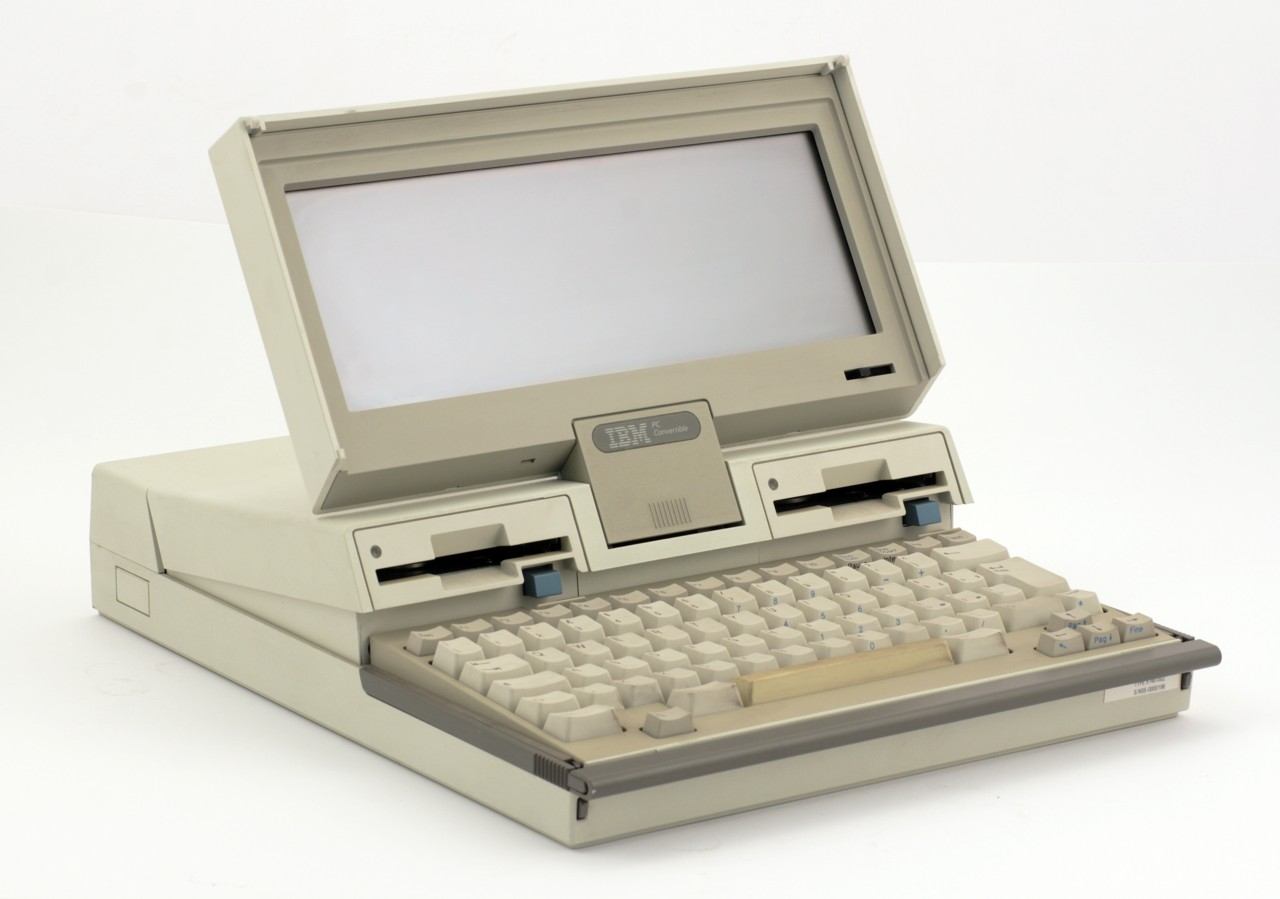
IBM 5140 portable computer (1987)

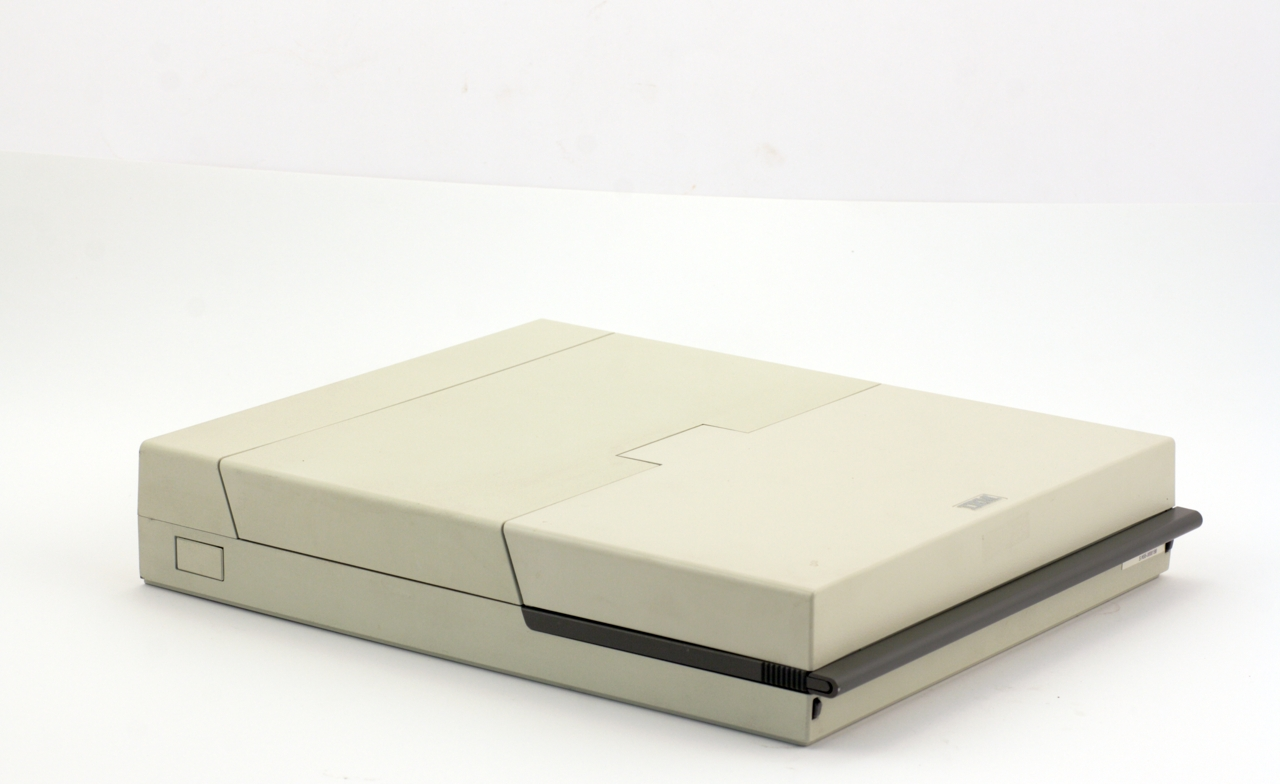
IBM 5140 portable computer (closed)

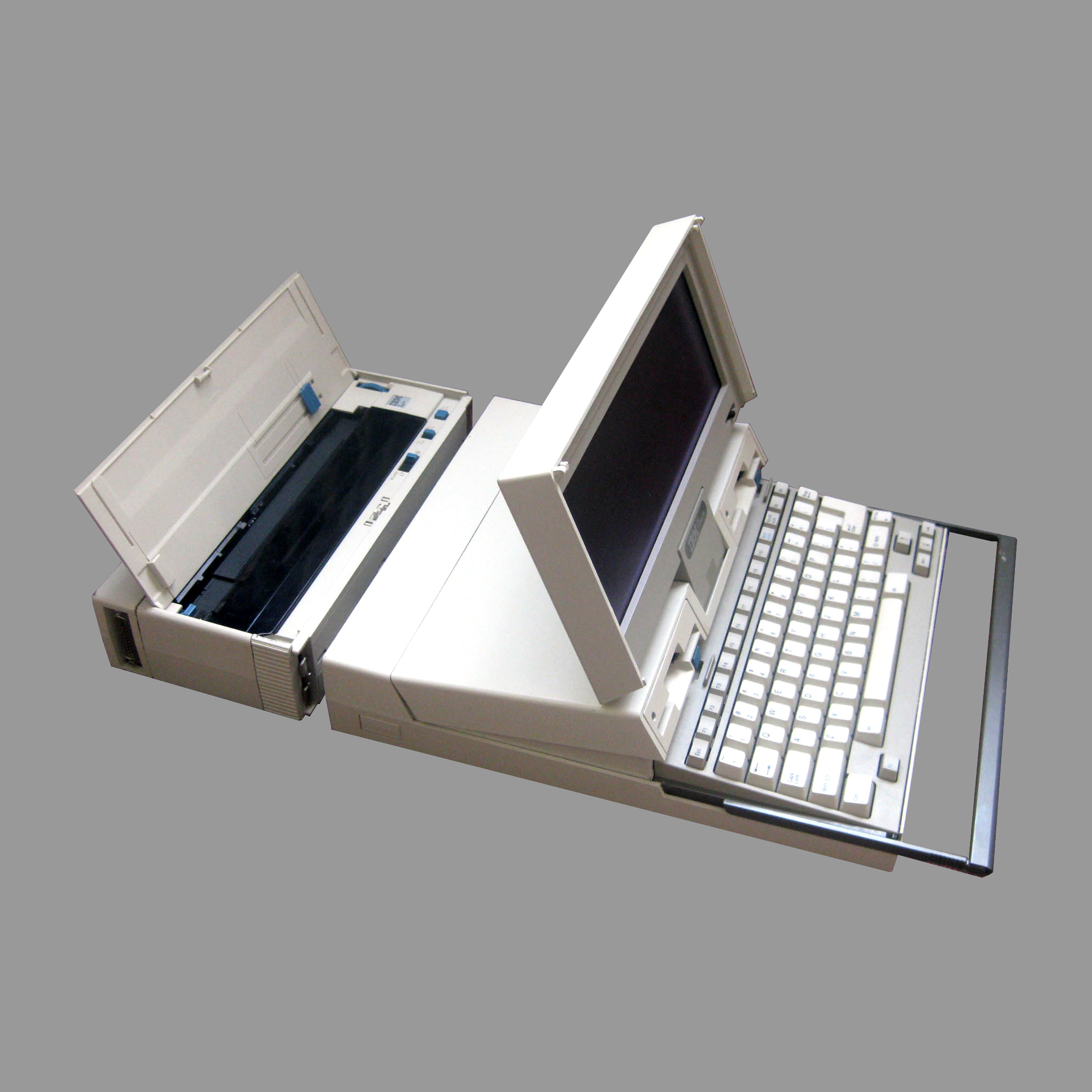
IBM 5140 portable computer (shown with printer)

== Life and career ==
He was born in Munich on 30 May 1932. He studied a number of subjects at the Ludwig-Maximilians-Universität München including philosophy, anatomy and engineering, before graduating with a business degree.

After beginning his career as a designer in the styling department at Mercedes-Benz in Stuttgart, Sapper relocated to Milan in 1958, where he initially joined the offices of architect Gio Ponti, and subsequently the design department of La Rinascente. In 1959, he partnered with Italian architect and designer Marco Zanuso, a collaboration that would last on and off for 18 years until 1977. The pair were hired in 1959 as consultants to Brionvega, an Italian company that manufactured well-designed electronics that competed with products from Japan and Germany. Together they designed a series of radios, televisions, and other consumer electronics that became enduring icons. Amongst their more well known designs were the rounded, compact and portable Doney 14 (1962), the first television to feature completely transistorized construction, and the radio TS 502 (1965), a rectangular box with hinges that upon opening reveals speakers and controls. Using the aesthetic of sculptural minimalism, they created the compact folding Grillo telephone for Siemens and Italtel in 1965. The Grillo was the first telephone featuring the flip-down mouthpiece, a precursor to the clamshell designs of later mobile phones. In 1964, Sapper and Zanuso designed the lightweight K1340 stacking children's chair for Kartell, the first chair produced entirely in plastic.

After starting his own studio in 1959, Sapper designed the Static table clock for Lorenz, for which he won his first Compasso d'Oro award in 1960. It is still in production today. In 1972 Sapper designed the Tizio lamp for Artemide, one of the first desk lamps to use a halogen bulb with low-voltage current conducting arms to eliminate the need for wires. The Tizio is one of the best-selling lamps ever produced, and also was a recipient of the Compasso d'Oro. It is in the design collection of numerous museums including the Metropolitain Museum and the Museum of Modern Art in New York, the Israel Museum in Jerusalem, and the Victoria and Albert Museum in London.

Sapper continued to create design classics including the Sapper Office Chair series for Knoll in 1979, a series of stop watches for Heuer in 1976 and the Nena folding chair for B&B Italia in 1984. In 1978, Alessi commissioned Sapper with the first product in a long series to come, the stove-top espresso maker 9090. It was followed, amongst other products, by the two-note whistling water kettle Bollitore in 1984, the Bandung teapot in 1990, the Coban espresso machine in 1997, the cheese grater Todo in 2006 and the Cintura di Orione cookware series in 1986 and 2009, conceived with the collaboration of chefs such as Roger Vergé, Pierre and Michel Troisgros, and Alain Chapel.

In 1980, Sapper was appointed principal industrial design consultant at IBM and began designing numerous portable computers, including the first ThinkPad 700C in 1992, which broke with the company's tradition of pearl-grey machines with a simple and elegant black rectangular box. This minimalistic box would reveal a surprise inside: a small red button amidst the keyboard which would serve to control the screen cursor. Sapper continued to oversee the ThinkPad brand as design consultant to Lenovo after it acquired the IBM PC Division in May 2005.

Throughout his career, Sapper devoted great attention to transportation issues. He worked with Fiat on experimental cars, especially on pneumatic bumper systems, and with Pirelli on the development of pneumatic structures. In 1972, he formed with architect Gae Aulenti a study group for the development of new urban transportation systems, a theme which he pursued further for an exhibition at the XVI Triennale in Milan in 1979 and which included the design of a bus for Fiat that enabled passengers to stow their bicycles in a rack. His research culminated with the design of the Zoombike (no longer in production), a lightweight bicycle designed with aircraft technology to achieve the required strength and speed acceleration, which can fold as quickly and simply as an umbrella and easily fit into a car trunk.

Sapper's clients included Alessi, Artemide, B&B Italia, Castelli, Heuer, IBM, Kartell, Knoll International, Lenovo, Lorenz, Magis, Molteni, Unifor, and Pirelli.

Sapper taught and lectured at Yale University, the Kunstakademie Stuttgart, Peking University, the Royal College of Art in London, the Domus Academy in Milan, the University of Buenos Aires, and the University of Applied Arts Vienna.

Sapper was made an Honorary Royal Designer for Industry by the Royal Society of Arts in the United Kingdom in 1988, and he was a Member of the Academy of Arts in Germany. The German Design Council awarded Sapper a lifetime achievement award for his design work in 2009, and he was bestowed an Honorary Doctorate (honoris causa) from the University of North Carolina in 2010. In 2012, Sapper received the Cross of Merit (German: Verdienstkreuz) of the Order of Merit from the President of the Federal Republic of Germany.

Sapper died on 31 December 2015 at the age of 83.

== Awards and honours ==
- 1960 Compasso d'Oro, Lorenz table clock
- 1962 Compasso d'Oro, Doney television (with Marco Zanuso)
- 1964 Compasso d'Oro, K 1340 Chair (with Marco Zanuso)
- 1966 Gold Medal, Ljubljana Biennale of Design, TS 502 radio (with Marco Zanuso)
- 1967 Compasso d'Oro, Grillo telephone (with Marco Zanuso)
- 1968 Gold Medal, Ljubljana Biennale of Design, Grillo telephone (with Marco Zanuso)
- 1973 Gold Medal, Ljubljana Biennale of Design, Rocket digital clock
- 1973 Honorable Mention, Ljubljana Biennale of Design, Black 201 television (with Marco Zanuso)
- 1979 Compasso d'Oro, 9090 Coffee maker
- 1987 Compasso d'Oro, From 9 to 5 office furniture system
- 1988 Appointed Honorary Royal Designer for Industry by the Royal Society of Arts, London
- 1991 Compasso d'Oro, Bridges 180/182 sectional system for fixed loader axle bridges
- 1992 Raymond Loewy Foundation Lucky Strike Award
- 1994 Compasso d'Oro, IBM Leapfrog computer
- 1998 Compasso d'Oro, Cobàn coffee machine
- 1998 Compasso d'Oro, Zoombike folding bicycle
- 2001 Elected to the Akademie der Künste, Berlin
- 2004 Compasso d'Oro (jury member)
- 2009 German Design Council lifetime achievement award
- 2010 Honorary Doctorate from the North Carolina State University
- 2012 Merit Cross of the Order of Merit, Germany
- 2014 Compasso d'Oro Career Award

== Personal life ==
He married Dorit Polz on January 16, 1963, in Stuttgart. They have 3 children (two girls and a boy), and three grandchildren.

== Publications ==
- Jonathan Olivares, Richard Sapper, Phaidon Press, New York, London 2016 ISBN 978-0714871202
- Michael Webb, Richard Sapper, Chronicle Books, San Francisco 2002
- Uta Brandes, Richard Sapper: Tools for Life, Steidl Verlag, Goettingen 1993
- Hans Höger, Tizio Light by Richard Sapper (Design Classics), Verlag form, Hamburg 1997
- Siegfried Gronert, The 9090 Cafetiere by Richard Sapper (Design Classics), Verlag form, Hamburg 1998
- Richard Sapper, Michael Horsham, The International Design Yearbook 1998, Laurence King, London 1998
