= ThinkPad X series =

Series of laptops by IBM and Lenovo

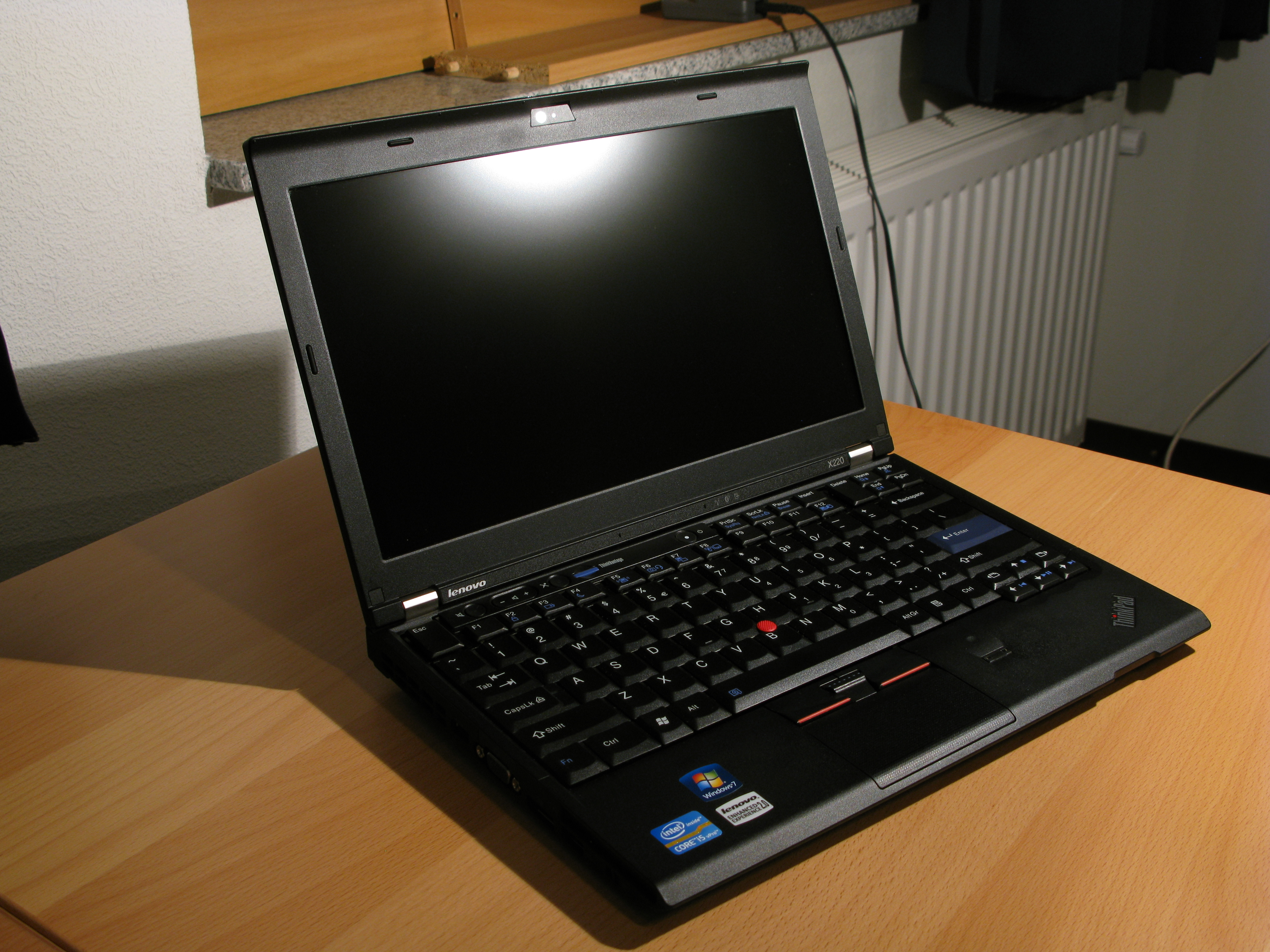
- ThinkPad X220
- Developer: IBM (2000–2004); LG/IBM (2000-2004, only for South Korea branding); Lenovo (2005–present)
- Type: Compact Laptop, Netbook (X1##e), Subnotebook (X2##), Ultrabook
- Released: September 2000
- Predecessor: ThinkPad 240; ThinkPad 500 series

The X series of laptops and convertible tablets are part of Lenovo's ThinkPad product line. The ThinkPad X series is traditionally the range best designed for mobile use, with ultraportable sizes and less power compared to the flagship ThinkPad T series. Formerly an IBM brand, Lenovo acquired the ThinkPad brand following its purchase of IBM's Personal Computing Division (PCD) in 2005.

IBM announced the ThinkPad X series (initially the X20) in September 2000 with the intention of providing "workers on the move with a better experience in extra-thin and extra-light mobile computing." The ThinkPad X series replaced both the 240 and 570 series during IBM's transition from numbered to letter series during the early 2000s. The first X Series laptops were "slimmer than a deck of cards" and "lighter than a half-gallon of milk", despite the presence of a 12.1-inch Thin-film transistor (TFT LCD) display. These design values—thin and light—continued to be integral to the ThinkPad X-series laptops' design and marketing, even after the purchase of IBM's Personal Computing Division by Lenovo. The last X-series ThinkPad released by IBM was the X41 tablet in 2004. Also, the first X-series ThinkPad released by Lenovo were the X60, X60s laptops and X60 tablet in 2005.

The ThinkPad X-series laptops from Lenovo were described by Trusted Reviews as "combining an ultraportable's weight and form factor with a durable design." The X-series laptop styles include traditional ultraportables, as well as convertible tablet designs. According to Lenovo, the ThinkPad X-series laptops include low power processors, offer long battery life, and several durability features such as a Roll Cage (Magnesium Frame around the Display), magnesium alloy covers, and a spill-resistant keyboard but currently lacks a replaceable battery and upgradable RAM slots.

Battery configuration

Main	M(x)	Main hot-swappable (max.cells)	Secondary	U	Ultrabay removable
Main	M(x)	Main hot-swappable (max.cells)	Secondary	u	Ultrabay unremovable
Main	M(x)	Main removable (max.cells)	Secondary	m(x)	internal (max.cells) "PowerBridge"
Main	m(x)	Main internal (max.cells)	Secondary	S	Slice battery

Laptop color codes

Processor

Socketed desktop processor
Socketed mobile processor
Soldered high power processor
Soldered standard power processor
Soldered low power processor
Soldered ultra low power processor

Weight

0.9 kg (2.0 lb)	Up to 0.91 kg
1.0 kg (2.2 lb)	0.92–1.0 kg
1.1 kg (2.4 lb)	1.01–1.1 kg
1.2 kg (2.6 lb)	1.11–1.2 kg
1.3 kg (2.9 lb)	1.21–1.3 kg
1.4 kg (3.1 lb)	1.31–1.4 kg
1.5 kg (3.3 lb)	1.41–1.5 kg
1.6 kg (3.5 lb)	1.51–1.6 kg
1.7 kg (3.7 lb)	1.61–1.7 kg
1.8 kg (4.0 lb)	1.71–1.81 kg
1.9 kg (4.2 lb)	1.81–1.91 kg
2.0 kg (4.4 lb)	1.91–2.03 kg
2.1 kg (4.6 lb)	2.04–2.14 kg
2.3 kg (5.1 lb)	2.15–2.4 kg
2.5 kg (5.5 lb)	2.41–2.75 kg
2.8 kg (6.2 lb)	2.76–3.05 kg
3.1 kg (6.8 lb)	3.06–3.42 kg
3.5 kg (7.7 lb)	3.43–3.99 kg
4.0 kg (8.8 lb)	4.0–4.99 kg
5.5 kg (12 lb)	5.0–6.49 kg
7.2 kg (16 lb)	6.5–7.99 kg
9.1 kg (20 lb)	8.0–9.99 kg
10.7 kg (24 lb)	10–11.99 kg
12.7 kg (28 lb)	12–14.49 kg
14.5 kg (32 lb)	14.5–17.99 kg
18.1 kg (40 lb)	18–20.99 kg
21.7 kg (48 lb)	21–23.99 kg
24 kg (53 lb)	24–28.99 kg
29.5 kg (65 lb)	29 kg and above

Screen resolution

4K or higher
1440p+ (WQHD, QXGA)
1080p+ (Full HD, UXGA)
Better than 768p (SXGA,SXGA+)
600p+ (SVGA, HD, XGA, HD+)
Up to 600p (VGA)

Graphics

Dual standard socket graphics option
Dual proprietary socket graphics option
Standard socket graphics option
Proprietary socket graphics option
Soldered performance graphics option
Soldered midrange graphics option
Soldered mainstream graphics option
Soldered entry graphics option
Integrated entry graphics
Integrated basic graphics

Laptop storage combinations (excluding WWAN slot)

Level	PCIe 4.0 x4	PCIe 3.0 x4	PCIe 3.0 x2	M.2 SATA	mSATA	1.8" SATA	2.5" SATA	1.8" IDE	2.5" IDE
	2019; Not yet (laptops)	2013	2013	2013	2009	2003	2003	1991	1988
	3						2		
	4								
	3						1		
	2						2		
	3					2			
	3								
	2						1		
	4								
	3					1			
	2					2			
	2								
	1						1		
	3								
	2					1			
	1								
	2								
	1					1			
			2				1		
							4		
		1							
			1				1		
							3		
			1						
				1			1		
					1		1		
						1	1		
							2		
									3
						1			
							1		
									2
								1	
									1

Laptop memory

Amount	LPDDR5X	LPDDR5	DDR5	LPDDR4X	LPDDR4	DDR4	LPDDR3	DDR4	DDR3L		DDR3		DDR2		DDR	SDR	EDO	FPM
Amount						dual channel		< dual channel	dual channel	< dual channel	dual channel	< dual channel	dual channel	< dual channel				
Amount	2022 (laptops)	2019 (laptops)	2020	2017	2014	2014	2012	2014	2010		2007		2003		1998	1993	1993	1987
max memory = 512 GB	N/A	N/A	512 GB	N/A	N/A	N/A	N/A	N/A	N/A	N/A	N/A	N/A	N/A	N/A	N/A	N/A	N/A	N/A
max memory = 256 GB	N/A		256 GB (4 slots)	N/A	N/A	N/A	N/A	N/A	N/A	N/A	N/A	N/A	N/A	N/A	N/A	N/A	N/A	N/A
max memory = 128 GB	128 GB		128 GB	N/A	N/A	128 GB (4 slots)	N/A	N/A	N/A	N/A	N/A	N/A	N/A	N/A	N/A	N/A	N/A	N/A
64 GB ≤ max memory < 128 GB		64 GB		N/A	N/A	64 GB	N/A	64 GB (2 slots)	64 GB (4 slots)	N/A	N/A	N/A	N/A	N/A	N/A	N/A	N/A	N/A
32 GB ≤ max memory < 64 GB				32 GB	32 GB	32 GB	N/A		32 GB	32 GB (2 slots)	32 GB (4 slots)	N/A	N/A	N/A	N/A	N/A	N/A	N/A
16 GB ≤ max memory < 32 GB						16 GB	16 GB		16 GB		16 GB	16 GB (2 slots)	16 GB (4 slots)	N/A	N/A	N/A	N/A	N/A
8 GB ≤ max memory < 16 GB						8 GB			8 GB		8 GB		8 GB	8 GB (2 slots)	8 GB (4 slots)	N/A	N/A	N/A
4 GB ≤ max memory < 8 GB						4 GB			4 GB		4 GB		4 GB		4 GB	4 GB (4 slots)	4 GB (4 slots)	N/A
2 GB ≤ max memory < 4 GB						2 GB (8 chips)			2 GB		2 GB		2 GB			2 GB	2 GB	N/A
1 GB ≤ max memory < 2 GB			1 GB (1 chip)	dual channel min	dual channel min	N/A		single channel min	1 GB		1 GB		1 GB					1 GB (4 slots)
512 MB ≤ max memory < 1 GB	N/A	N/A	N/A	single channel min	single channel min	N/A	dual channel min	half channel min	512 MB (8 chips)		512 MB (8 chips)		512 MB					512 MB
256 MB ≤ max memory < 512 MB	N/A	N/A	N/A	256 MB (1 chip)	256 MB (1 chip)	N/A	single channel min	256 MB (1 chip)	N/A	single channel min	N/A	single channel min	256 MB					
128 MB ≤ max memory < 256 MB	N/A	N/A	N/A	N/A	N/A	N/A	128 MB (1 chip)	N/A	N/A	half channel min	N/A	half channel min						
64 MB ≤ max memory < 128 MB	N/A	N/A	N/A	N/A	N/A	N/A	N/A	N/A	N/A	64 MB (1 chip)	N/A	64 MB (1 chip)						
max memory < 64 MB	N/A	N/A	N/A	N/A	N/A	N/A	N/A	N/A	N/A	N/A	N/A	N/A						

== IBM-branded models ==
IBM-branded ThinkPad X 2000–2004; Lenovo-branded ThinkPad X 2005-2008
Screen size	Type	4∶3 screens								
Screen size	Type	X2*/X3*/X4*							X6* (2006–2008)	
Screen size	Type	2000	2001		2002		2003-2004	2005	X6* (2006–2008)	
12.1" (4:3)	Standard	X20	X21	X22	X23	X24				
12.1" (4:3)	Standard					X30	X31	X32	X60	X61
12.1" (4:3)	Rotation convertible							X41; Tablet	X60; Tablet	X61; Tablet
12.1" (4:3)	Slim	X20	X21				X40	X41	X60s	X61s
Docking stations compatibility
Standard Dock (2631); Port Replicator		All					X31			
UltraBase X2 media slice			All			X24				
Dock II (2877); Port Replicator II; Mini-Dock (2878)							X31			
UltraBase media slice						X30, X31, X32				
X4 UltraBase							X40, X41			
X4 Dock							X40, X41, X41 Tablet			
X6 UltraBase									X60, X60s, X61, X61s	
X6 Tablet UltraBase									X60 Tablet, X61 Tablet	

=== 2000 ===
==== X20 ====
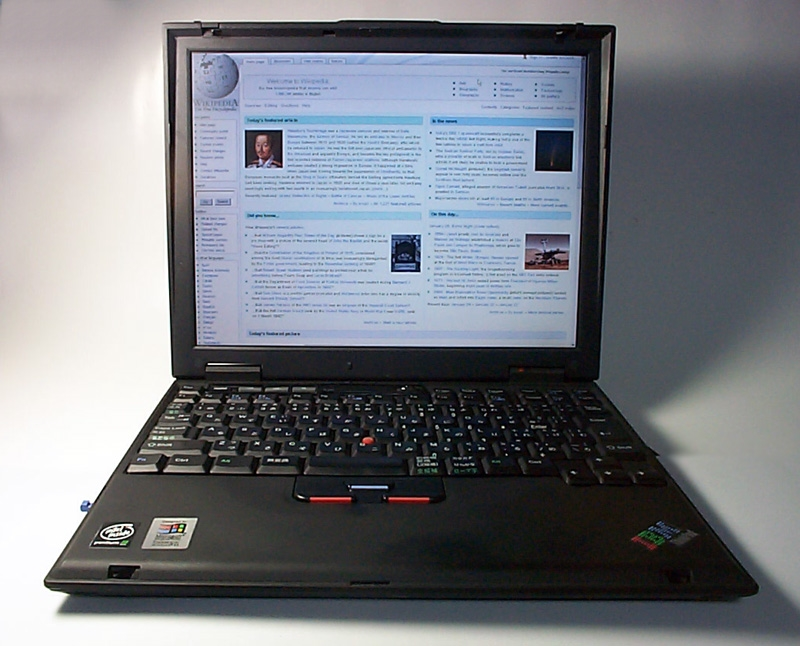
ThinkPad X20

The X20 was the first in IBM/Lenovo's long-standing X-series ultraportable line; the Celeron-based configurations had a thinner case.

- Processor: Intel Coppermine Mobile, Celeron (500 MHz), or Pentium III (600 MHz)
- Memory: 64–128 MiB, maximum of 320 MiB (1 slot, 64 MiB soldered) SDR
- Storage: IDE, 10 or 20 GB
- Display: 12.1 in (31 cm) SVGA (800 × 600) or XGA (1024 × 768) CCFL-backlit TN LCD
- Dimensions: 279 × 227 × 25–30 mm (or 24–28 mm with Celeron CPU)
- Mass/Weight: 1.6 kg (3.5 lb), or 1.43 kg (3.2 lb) (with standard battery, and Pentium III or Celeron CPU)

=== 2001 ===
==== X21 ====
Same specifications as the X20, except an optional 600 or 700 MHz processor and more onboard RAM could be ordered.

==== X22 ====
All new internal design, slim-version dropped, SVGA screen option dropped, Tualatin CPUs, faster (Mobility Radeon 7000 8 MiB) GPU, Communications Daughter Card/CDC slot, optional FireWire and/or WiFi on some models, 133 MHz FSB, maximum RAM increased to 640 MiB.

- Processor: Intel Pentium III Mobile (733 or 800 MHz)
- Memory: 128, 256, up to 640 MiB (1 slot, 128 MiB soldered) SDR; 8-chip 512 MiB or 4-chip 128 MiB modules only.
- Storage: IDE, 10 or 20 GB
- Display: 12.1 in (31 cm) XGA (1024 × 768) CCFL-backlit TN LCD
- Dimensions: 279 × 227 × 25–30 mm
- Mass/Weight: 1.56 kg (3.4 lb) (with standard battery)

=== 2002 ===
==== X23 ====
Same as the X22 but with faster processors (800 or 866 MHz), bigger hard drives up to 30 GB, Bluetooth, and the IBM Security Sub System on selected models.

==== X24 ====
Same as the X23 with even faster processors: 1.06 to 1.13 GHz.

==== X30 ====
Full-powered successor to the X2x line with a completely redesigned case. However, they shared much of the technology. 830MG chipset with Intel Extreme Graphics GPU. Maximum of 1 GiB RAM, thanks to two RAM slots. FireWire was now standard on all models. Up to 60 GB hard drives were available, and additional secondary "Extended Life Battery" could be purchased.

- Processor: Intel Pentium III-M (1.06 or 1.2 GHz)
- Memory: 128, 256, or 512 MiB DDR (up to 1024 MiB, 2 slots)
- Storage: IDE, 15, 20, 30, 40, 48 or 60 GB
- Display: 12.1 in (31 cm) XGA (1024 × 768) CCFL-backlit TN LCD
- Dimensions: 273 × 223 × 25–30 mm
- Mass/Weight: 1.64 kg (3.6 lb) (with standard battery)

=== 2003 ===
==== X31 ====
X30 updated to the Intel Centrino platform, Pentium M CPUs, faster RAM (DDR PC2100), better GPU (ATI Radeon 7000) and more VRAM (16 MiB), USB 2.0, 2nd USB port on the left side, Gigabit LAN introduced on some models, IBM Security Sub System on some models.

- Processor: Intel Pentium M (Banias), L2-Cache: 1 MiB, TDP: 22–24.5 W, 400 MT/s FSB
  - 1.3 GHz, 1.4 GHz, 1.5 GHz, 1.6 GHz, or 1.7 GHz
- Memory: 256–512 MiB DDR (up to 2048 MiB, 2 slots)
- Storage: IDE 2.5";
  - Models with 4200 RPM drives and capacities of 20, 30, 40, or 60 GB
  - Models with 5400 RPM drives and capacities of 40, 60, or 80 GB
- Display: 12.1 in (31 cm) XGA (1024 × 768) CCFL-backlit TN LCD
- Dimensions: 273 × 223 × 30.2 mm
- Mass/Weight: 1.64 kg (3.6 lb) (with standard battery)

=== 2004 ===
==== X40 ====
The X40 was announced by IBM in 2004. This is the first model in a new "Thin and Light" sub-line. Specifications:

- Processor: Intel Pentium M 1.0, 1.2, or 1.3 GHz (Banias) or 1.1, 1.2, 1.4, 1.5, or 1.6 GHz (Dothan)
- Memory: 256–1,536 MiB DDR (256 or 512 MiB (Note: Optional 512 MB only with 1.2 GHz Banias CPU or with 1.4/1.5/1.6 GHz Dothan CPU) soldered, 1 slot)
- Storage: IDE 1.8", 20 or 40 GB
- Display: 12.1 in (31 cm) XGA (1024 × 768) CCFL-backlit TN LCD
- Dimensions: 268 mm × 211 mm × 21–27 mm
- Mass/Weight: 1.23 kg (2.7 lb)

CNET rated the X40 as "very good" with an 8.5 out of 10.

==== X41, X41 Tablet ====
The X41 ultraportable notebook was announced by IBM in 2004, and the X41 tablet was announced by the company itself in 2004. The X41 tablet was convertible, with the capacity to function as a tablet PC and an ultraportable laptop.

==== X32 ====
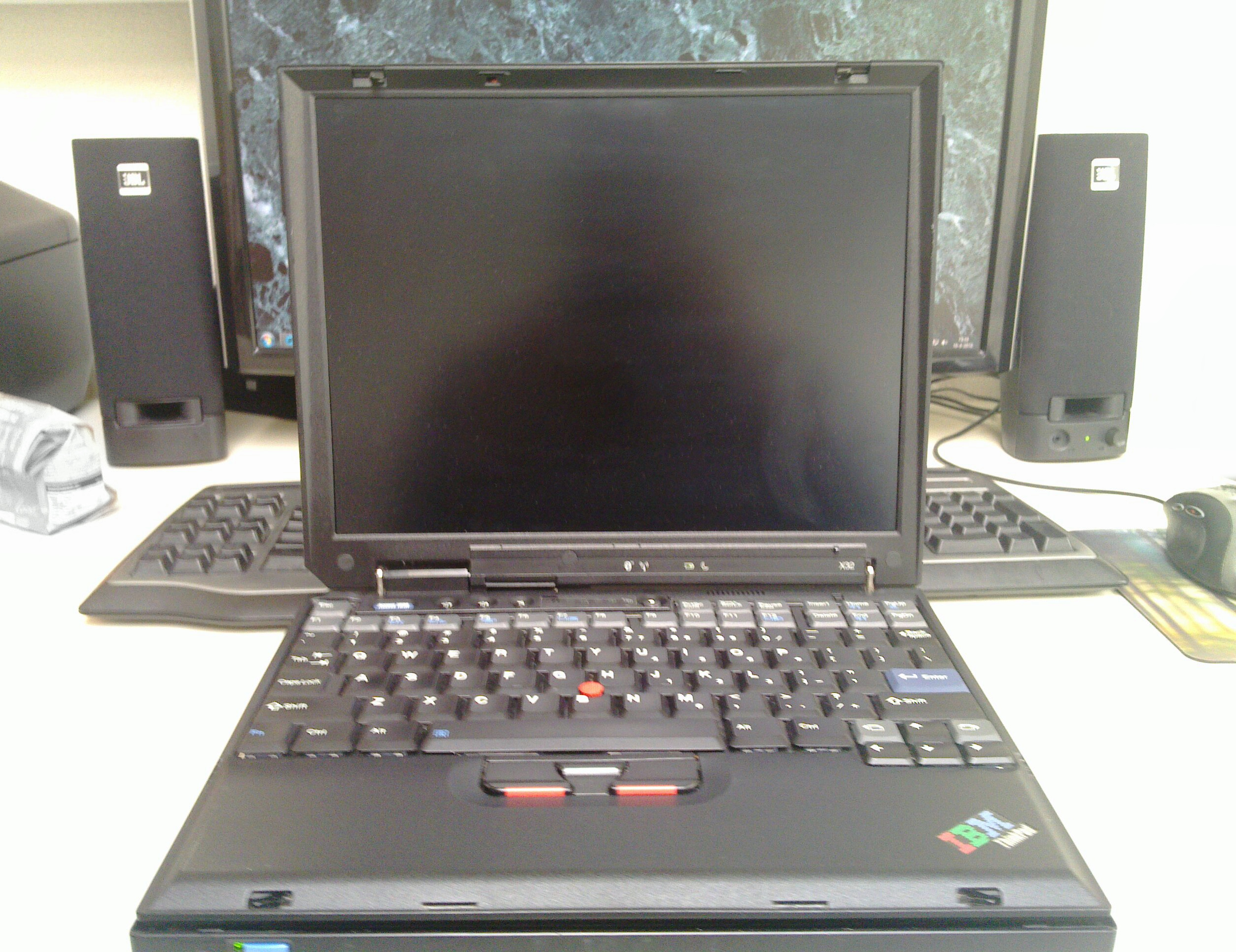
A modified ThinkPad X32 equipped with an X60 tablet IPS display, docked in an UltraBase X3

The X32 was introduced in 2004. The numbering system was irregular, as it was actually introduced after the X40, but using the older X3x chassis design. It was also more powerful than the X40 and X41 units, due to the use of faster full-voltage Dothan processors and standard 2.5-inch 5400/7200 RPM hard drives. It was a very short-lived model, discontinued within months of introduction. On this model, IBM included Gigabit LAN and the Security Sub System on all models. The X32 and X41 are two of the last IBM-designed ThinkPads before Lenovo took over. The X41 tablet was released by IBM (shortly after Lenovo acquiring the ThinkPad product line).

== Lenovo-branded models ==
Lenovo ThinkPad X (2005–2023) including X1 and parts of Yoga
Screens aspect ratio:		4∶3	16∶10			16∶9											16∶10		2∶1		16∶10		
Screen	Type	X61*	X*0*				X*2* (2011)	X*3* (2012)	X*4* (2013)	2014	X*5* (2015)	X*6* (2016)	X*7* (2017)	X*8* (2018)	X*9* (2019)	2020		2021		2022		2023	2024
Screen	Type	X61*	2008		2010		X*2* (2011)	X*3* (2012)	X*4* (2013)	2014	X*5* (2015)	X*6* (2016)	X*7* (2017)	X*8* (2018)	X*9* (2019)	2020		2021		2022		2023	2024
11.6"	Netbook					X100e	X120e	X130e	X140e	replaced by 11e													
11.6"	Netbook						X121e	X131e		replaced by 11e													
12.5"	Slim	X61s	X200s		X201s			X230s	X240s														
12.5"	Standard	X61	X200		X201		X220	X230	X240		X250	X260	X270	X280	replaced by X390								
12.5"	Standard (AMD)												A275	A285	replaced by X395								
12.5"	Low-cost				X201i		X220i	X230i															
12.5"	Rotation convertible	X61t	X200t		X201t		X220t	X230t	replaced by Helix														
12.5"	Rotation convertible				X201ti		X220ti	X230ti	replaced by Helix														
12.5"	Flipbook «2-in-1»	predecessor: ThinkPad Yoga										260 Yoga	replaced by 370 Yoga										
13.3"	Flipbook «2-in-1»												370 Yoga	X380 Yoga	X390 Yoga	X13 Yoga Gen1		X13 Yoga Gen2			X13 Yoga Gen3	X13 Yoga Gen4	X13 2-in-1 Gen5
13.3"	Standard														X390	X13 Gen1		X13 Gen2			X13 Gen3	X13 Gen4	X13 Gen5
13.3"	Standard (AMD)														X395	X13 Gen1					X13 Gen3	X13 Gen4	X13 Gen5
13.3"	Premium		X300	X301			X1	replaced by X1 Carbon															
X1 series
12.5"	Tablet											X1 Tablet Gen1	X1 Tablet Gen2	replaced by 13" line									
13.3"	Tablet													X1 Tablet Gen3						X1 Fold			
13.3"	Ultralight																X1 Nano Gen1				X1 Nano Gen2	X1 Nano Gen3	
13.5"	Flipbook «2-in-1»																		X1 Titanium Yoga Gen1				
14.1"	Flipbook «2-in-1»											X1 Yoga Gen1	X1 Yoga Gen2	X1 Yoga Gen3	X1 Yoga Gen4	X1 Yoga Gen5		X1 Yoga Gen6			X1 Yoga Gen7	X1 Yoga Gen8	X1 2-in- Gen9
14.1"	Premium ultrabook							X1 Carbon Gen1		X1 Carbon Gen2	X1 Carbon Gen3	X1 Carbon Gen4	X1 Carbon Gen5	X1 Carbon Gen6	X1 Carbon Gen7	X1 Carbon Gen8		X1 Carbon Gen9			X1 Carbon Gen10	X1 Carbon Gen11	X1 Carbon Gen12
15.6"	Premium ultrabook													X1 Extreme; Gen1	X1 Extreme; Gen2	X1 Extreme; Gen3	replaced by 16" line						
16"	Premium ultrabook																	X1 Extreme; Gen4			X1 Extreme; Gen5	replaced by P1	
Docking stations and port replicators compatibility (12" and X series laptops only)
X6 Ultrabase		X61/X61s																					
X6 Tablet UltraBase		X61 tablet																					
X200 Ultrabase			All 12"																				
Port Replicator Series 3							All 12"																
UltraBase; Series 3							All 12"																
Mini Dock series 3 Mini Dock Plus series 3							X220/X220i; X230/X230i (with some issues); X220t (after modification)																
Basic Dock; Pro Dock											X250, X260												
Ultra Dock									X240, X250, X260														
USB-C Dock													X270, X280; X1 Carbon, X1 Extreme										
Basic Dock (USB-C); Pro Dock (USB-C); Ultra Dock (USB-C)														X280; X1 Carbon; X1 Extreme									
X1 port replicators
OneLink Dock										X1 Carbon													

Battery configuration

Main	M(x)	Main hot-swappable (max.cells)	Secondary	U	Ultrabay removable
Main	M(x)	Main hot-swappable (max.cells)	Secondary	u	Ultrabay unremovable
Main	M(x)	Main removable (max.cells)	Secondary	m(x)	internal (max.cells) "PowerBridge"
Main	m(x)	Main internal (max.cells)	Secondary	S	Slice battery

Laptop color codes

Processor

Socketed desktop processor
Socketed mobile processor
Soldered high power processor
Soldered standard power processor
Soldered low power processor
Soldered ultra low power processor

Weight

0.9 kg (2.0 lb)	Up to 0.91 kg
1.0 kg (2.2 lb)	0.92–1.0 kg
1.1 kg (2.4 lb)	1.01–1.1 kg
1.2 kg (2.6 lb)	1.11–1.2 kg
1.3 kg (2.9 lb)	1.21–1.3 kg
1.4 kg (3.1 lb)	1.31–1.4 kg
1.5 kg (3.3 lb)	1.41–1.5 kg
1.6 kg (3.5 lb)	1.51–1.6 kg
1.7 kg (3.7 lb)	1.61–1.7 kg
1.8 kg (4.0 lb)	1.71–1.81 kg
1.9 kg (4.2 lb)	1.81–1.91 kg
2.0 kg (4.4 lb)	1.91–2.03 kg
2.1 kg (4.6 lb)	2.04–2.14 kg
2.3 kg (5.1 lb)	2.15–2.4 kg
2.5 kg (5.5 lb)	2.41–2.75 kg
2.8 kg (6.2 lb)	2.76–3.05 kg
3.1 kg (6.8 lb)	3.06–3.42 kg
3.5 kg (7.7 lb)	3.43–3.99 kg
4.0 kg (8.8 lb)	4.0–4.99 kg
5.5 kg (12 lb)	5.0–6.49 kg
7.2 kg (16 lb)	6.5–7.99 kg
9.1 kg (20 lb)	8.0–9.99 kg
10.7 kg (24 lb)	10–11.99 kg
12.7 kg (28 lb)	12–14.49 kg
14.5 kg (32 lb)	14.5–17.99 kg
18.1 kg (40 lb)	18–20.99 kg
21.7 kg (48 lb)	21–23.99 kg
24 kg (53 lb)	24–28.99 kg
29.5 kg (65 lb)	29 kg and above

Screen resolution

4K or higher
1440p+ (WQHD, QXGA)
1080p+ (Full HD, UXGA)
Better than 768p (SXGA,SXGA+)
600p+ (SVGA, HD, XGA, HD+)
Up to 600p (VGA)

Graphics

Dual standard socket graphics option
Dual proprietary socket graphics option
Standard socket graphics option
Proprietary socket graphics option
Soldered performance graphics option
Soldered midrange graphics option
Soldered mainstream graphics option
Soldered entry graphics option
Integrated entry graphics
Integrated basic graphics

Laptop storage combinations (excluding WWAN slot)

Level	PCIe 4.0 x4	PCIe 3.0 x4	PCIe 3.0 x2	M.2 SATA	mSATA	1.8" SATA	2.5" SATA	1.8" IDE	2.5" IDE
	2019; Not yet (laptops)	2013	2013	2013	2009	2003	2003	1991	1988
	3						2		
	4								
	3						1		
	2						2		
	3					2			
	3								
	2						1		
	4								
	3					1			
	2					2			
	2								
	1						1		
	3								
	2					1			
	1								
	2								
	1					1			
			2				1		
							4		
		1							
			1				1		
							3		
			1						
				1			1		
					1		1		
						1	1		
							2		
									3
						1			
							1		
									2
								1	
									1

Laptop memory

Amount	LPDDR5X	LPDDR5	DDR5	LPDDR4X	LPDDR4	DDR4	LPDDR3	DDR4	DDR3L		DDR3		DDR2		DDR	SDR	EDO	FPM
Amount						dual channel		< dual channel	dual channel	< dual channel	dual channel	< dual channel	dual channel	< dual channel				
Amount	2022 (laptops)	2019 (laptops)	2020	2017	2014	2014	2012	2014	2010		2007		2003		1998	1993	1993	1987
max memory = 512 GB	N/A	N/A	512 GB	N/A	N/A	N/A	N/A	N/A	N/A	N/A	N/A	N/A	N/A	N/A	N/A	N/A	N/A	N/A
max memory = 256 GB	N/A		256 GB (4 slots)	N/A	N/A	N/A	N/A	N/A	N/A	N/A	N/A	N/A	N/A	N/A	N/A	N/A	N/A	N/A
max memory = 128 GB	128 GB		128 GB	N/A	N/A	128 GB (4 slots)	N/A	N/A	N/A	N/A	N/A	N/A	N/A	N/A	N/A	N/A	N/A	N/A
64 GB ≤ max memory < 128 GB		64 GB		N/A	N/A	64 GB	N/A	64 GB (2 slots)	64 GB (4 slots)	N/A	N/A	N/A	N/A	N/A	N/A	N/A	N/A	N/A
32 GB ≤ max memory < 64 GB				32 GB	32 GB	32 GB	N/A		32 GB	32 GB (2 slots)	32 GB (4 slots)	N/A	N/A	N/A	N/A	N/A	N/A	N/A
16 GB ≤ max memory < 32 GB						16 GB	16 GB		16 GB		16 GB	16 GB (2 slots)	16 GB (4 slots)	N/A	N/A	N/A	N/A	N/A
8 GB ≤ max memory < 16 GB						8 GB			8 GB		8 GB		8 GB	8 GB (2 slots)	8 GB (4 slots)	N/A	N/A	N/A
4 GB ≤ max memory < 8 GB						4 GB			4 GB		4 GB		4 GB		4 GB	4 GB (4 slots)	4 GB (4 slots)	N/A
2 GB ≤ max memory < 4 GB						2 GB (8 chips)			2 GB		2 GB		2 GB			2 GB	2 GB	N/A
1 GB ≤ max memory < 2 GB			1 GB (1 chip)	dual channel min	dual channel min	N/A		single channel min	1 GB		1 GB		1 GB					1 GB (4 slots)
512 MB ≤ max memory < 1 GB	N/A	N/A	N/A	single channel min	single channel min	N/A	dual channel min	half channel min	512 MB (8 chips)		512 MB (8 chips)		512 MB					512 MB
256 MB ≤ max memory < 512 MB	N/A	N/A	N/A	256 MB (1 chip)	256 MB (1 chip)	N/A	single channel min	256 MB (1 chip)	N/A	single channel min	N/A	single channel min	256 MB					
128 MB ≤ max memory < 256 MB	N/A	N/A	N/A	N/A	N/A	N/A	128 MB (1 chip)	N/A	N/A	half channel min	N/A	half channel min						
64 MB ≤ max memory < 128 MB	N/A	N/A	N/A	N/A	N/A	N/A	N/A	N/A	N/A	64 MB (1 chip)	N/A	64 MB (1 chip)						
max memory < 64 MB	N/A	N/A	N/A	N/A	N/A	N/A	N/A	N/A	N/A	N/A	N/A	N/A						

=== 2005-2006 ===
The X-series laptops released in 2005 by Lenovo were the X60, X60s, and X60 Tablet.

==== X60 and X60s ====
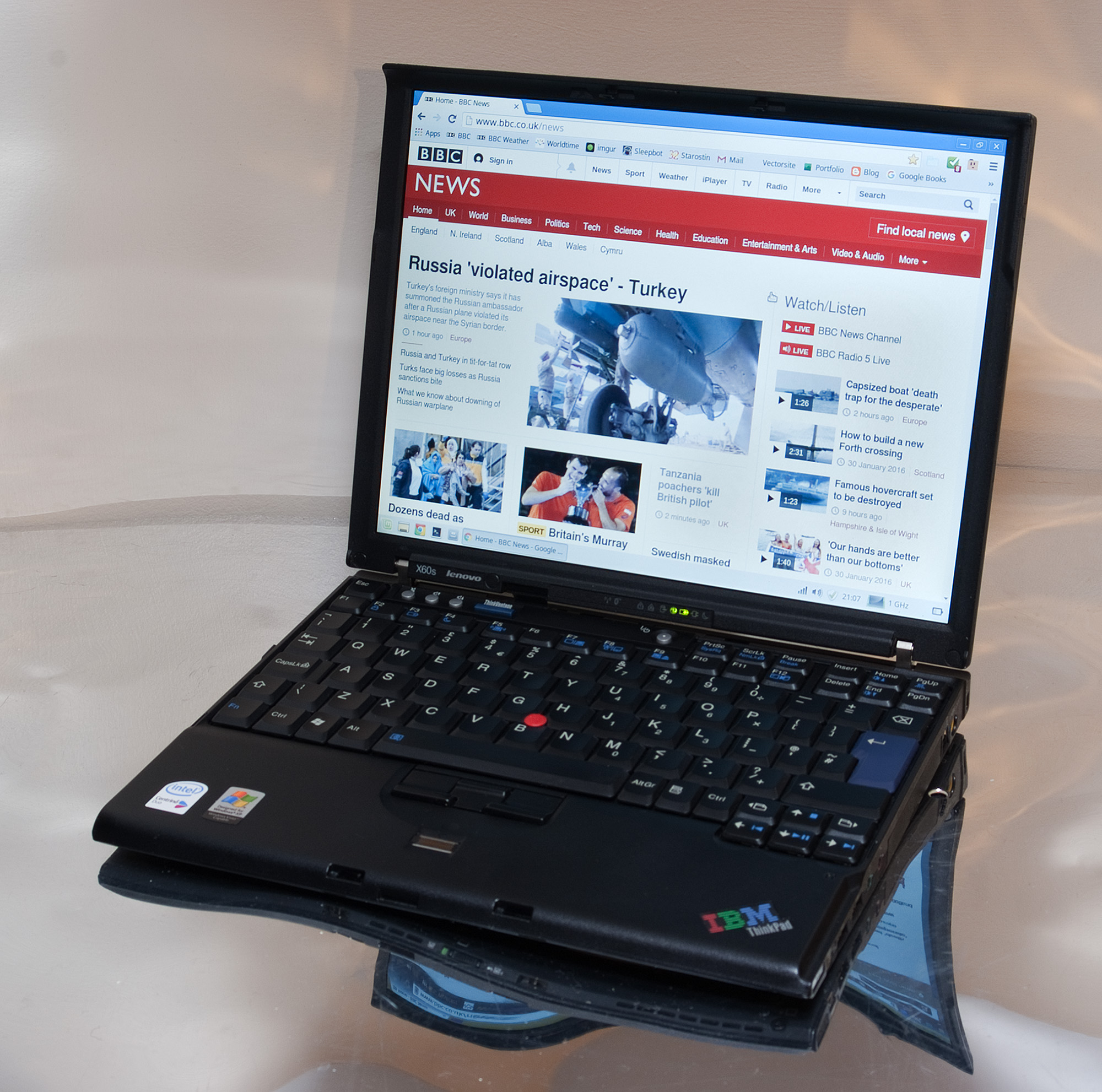
A Lenovo ThinkPad X60s

The X60 and X60s slimline differed primarily by their processors: the X60s had a soldered low voltage processor, while the X60 did not. This gave the X60s a lower active temperature and longer battery life in exchange for reduced performance. The X60s also had a smaller heatsink and a slightly thinner case with a different battery form factor, although it could use standard X60 batteries with a plastic adapter.

In its review of the ThinkPad X60/X60s, Notebook Review called the laptop, "Hands down the best performing ultraportable on the market", while raising issues about the design and the lack of an optical drive.

The two laptops were available in a variety of configurations. Later X60 models used 64-bit Core 2 Duo CPUs, and some X60s were available with a lightweight LCD panel. Typical specifications of the laptops are provided below:

- Processor:
  - Intel Core Solo T1300 (1.6 GHz), Core Duo T2300E, T2400, T2500 (1.66–2.0 GHz) or Core 2 Duo T5500, T5600, T7200 (1.66–2.0 GHz) – X60
  - Intel Core Duo L2300, L2400, L2500 (1.50–1.83 GHz), or Core 2 Duo L7400 (1.50 GHz) – X60s
- Chipset: Intel 945GM
- Memory: up to 3.2 GiB DDR2 (2 slots, fits 4 GiB, but chipset limit is 3.2 GiB)
- Graphics: Intel GMA 950
- Storage: 1 × 2.5" SATA 1.5 Gbit/s (80 GB 5400 RPM)
- Display: 12.1 in (31 cm) 1024 × 768 CCFL-backlit TN LCD
- Mass/Weight: starting at 1.43 kg (3.15 lb) (X60), or 1.38 kg (3.04 lb) (X60s)
- Operating System: Microsoft Windows XP Professional

==== X60 Tablet ====
The ThinkPad X60 Tablet was praised by reviewers. LAPTOP Magazine said the ThinkPad X60 Tablet "raises the bar for business-class convertibles". The most significant issue raised was the low capacity 4-cell battery, which provided a battery life of two hours.

=== 2007 ===
The X Series laptops released by Lenovo in 2007 were the X61, the X61s, and the X61 tablet.

==== X61 and X61s ====
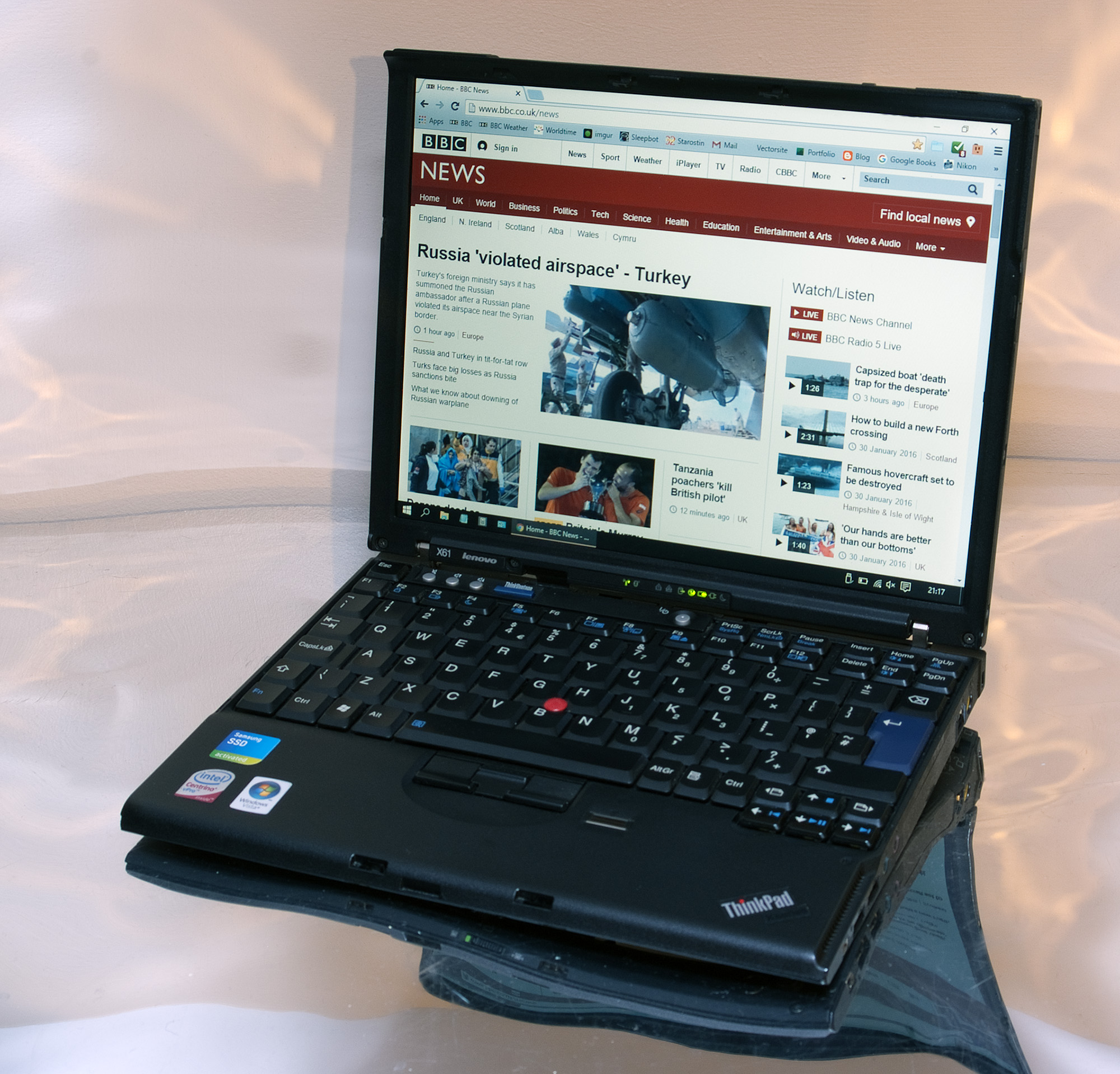
A Lenovo ThinkPad X61

The X61 received mixed user reviews on CNET, with some users reporting display problems and delivery delays, while others praised the laptop for performance and portability.

Reviewers, however, praised the ultraportable. Notebook Review called it an "extremely fast ultraportable". However, they criticized the display colors and viewing angles. They also pointed out that the palm rest was prone to heating up because of the wireless networking card underneath it.

The X61s was lauded for its excellent build quality, performance, and long battery life. The battery was an improvement over the X41. The model is one of the last to feature a 4∶3 aspect ratio display.

The specifications of the X61 are given below:
- Processor: Intel Core 2 Duo T7100 (1.8 GHz) to T9300 to (2.5 GHz)
- Chipset: Intel 965GM
- Memory: from 512 MiB to 4096 MiB DDR2 667 MT/s (2 slots, 8192 MiB is unofficially supported)
- Graphics: Intel X3100
- Display: 12.1 in (31 cm) 1024 × 768 (4∶3) CCFL-backlit TN LCD (Note: from many unspecified manufacturers (Samsung, BoeHydis, ChiMei, and lightweight X60s screen by Toshiba/Matsushita), and therefore different qualities; but unofficial replaceable by a X61 tablet 1400 × 1050 AFFS screen)
- Storage: 1 × SATA 1.5 Gbit/s (from 80–160 GB) (Note: any SATA HDD or SSD will work, and via a BIOS mod it supports SATA 3 Gbit/s)
- Mass/Weight: starting at 1.41 kg (3.1 lb)
The specifications of the most common models the X61s are given below:
- Processor: Intel Core 2 Duo L7500 1.6 GHz
- Chipset: Intel 965GM
- Memory: from 512 MiB to 4096 MiB DDR2 667 MHz (2 slots, 8192 MiB is unofficially supported)
- Graphics: Intel X3100
- Display: 12.1 in (31 cm) 1024 × 768 (4∶3) CCFL-backlit TN LCD
- Storage: 1 × SATA 1.5 Gbit/s (100 GB 7200 RPM)
- Operating System: Microsoft Windows Vista Business 32-bit

Some X60s models shipped with the Intel Core 2 Duo L7300 clocked at 1.40 GHz or the L7700 clocked at 1.80 GHz. As of 2018, it was still possible to purchase new batteries and spare parts for these laptops from a few online retailers.

==== X61 Tablet ====
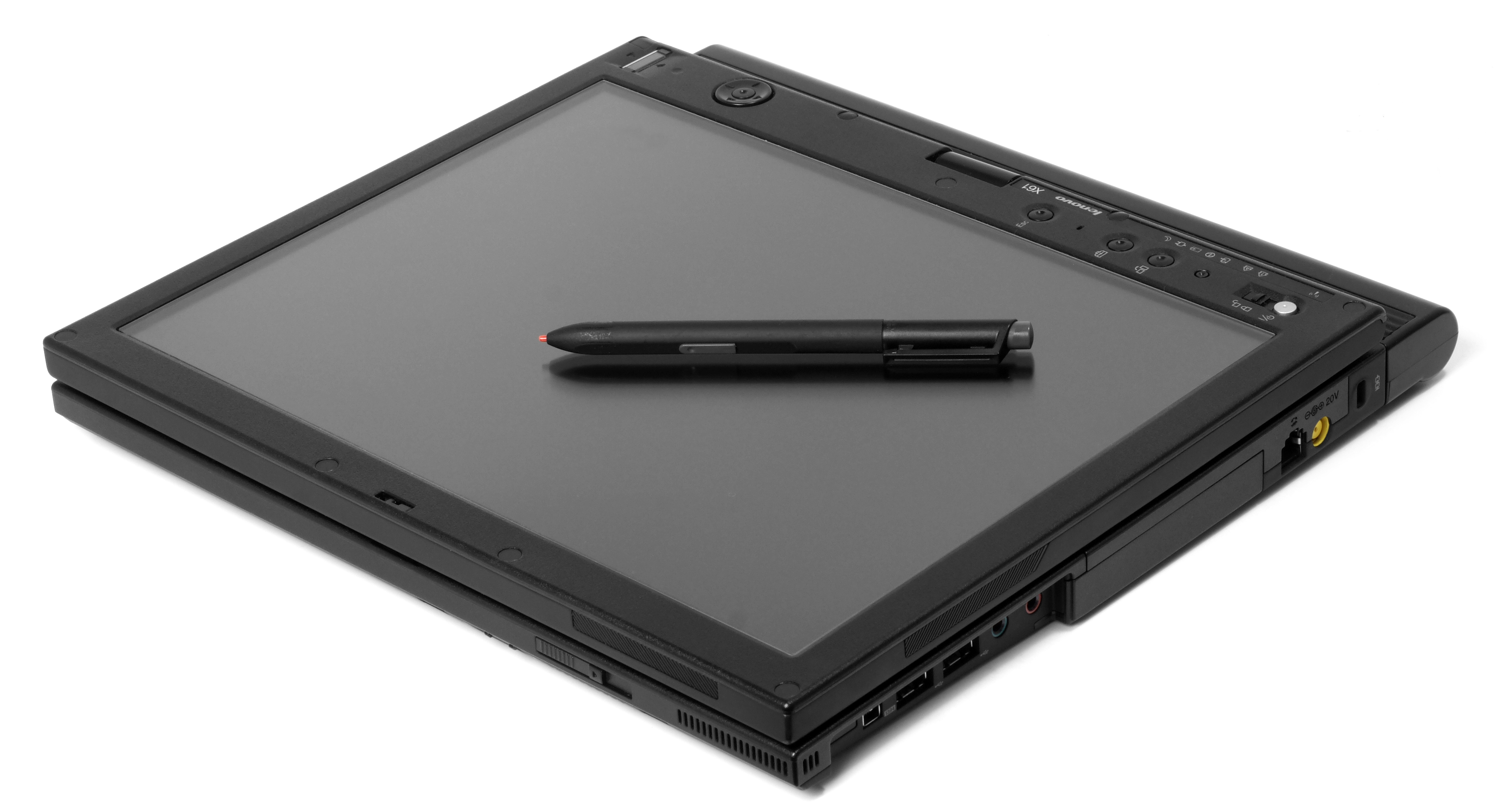
An X61 tablet, flipped to tablet mode

The ThinkPad X61 tablet also received positive reviews, with IT Reviews saying that "the build quality and engineering are second to none and this shines through with the tablet features which have been executed with something close to genius". However, the high price tag and relatively inadequate performance were criticized by the reviewer.

tabletPC Review acknowledged the sturdiness of the X61 tablet, the high battery life, and the quality of the pen. The features that met with disfavor were the lack of a widescreen, display brightness and colors, and the lack of an optical drive—although the reviewer admitted that the absence helps reduce weight.

=== 2008 ===
The laptops released in the X series in 2008 followed the new naming conventions established by Lenovo. The X Series laptops released by Lenovo in 2008 were X200, X200t and X300.

==== X200 and X200s ====
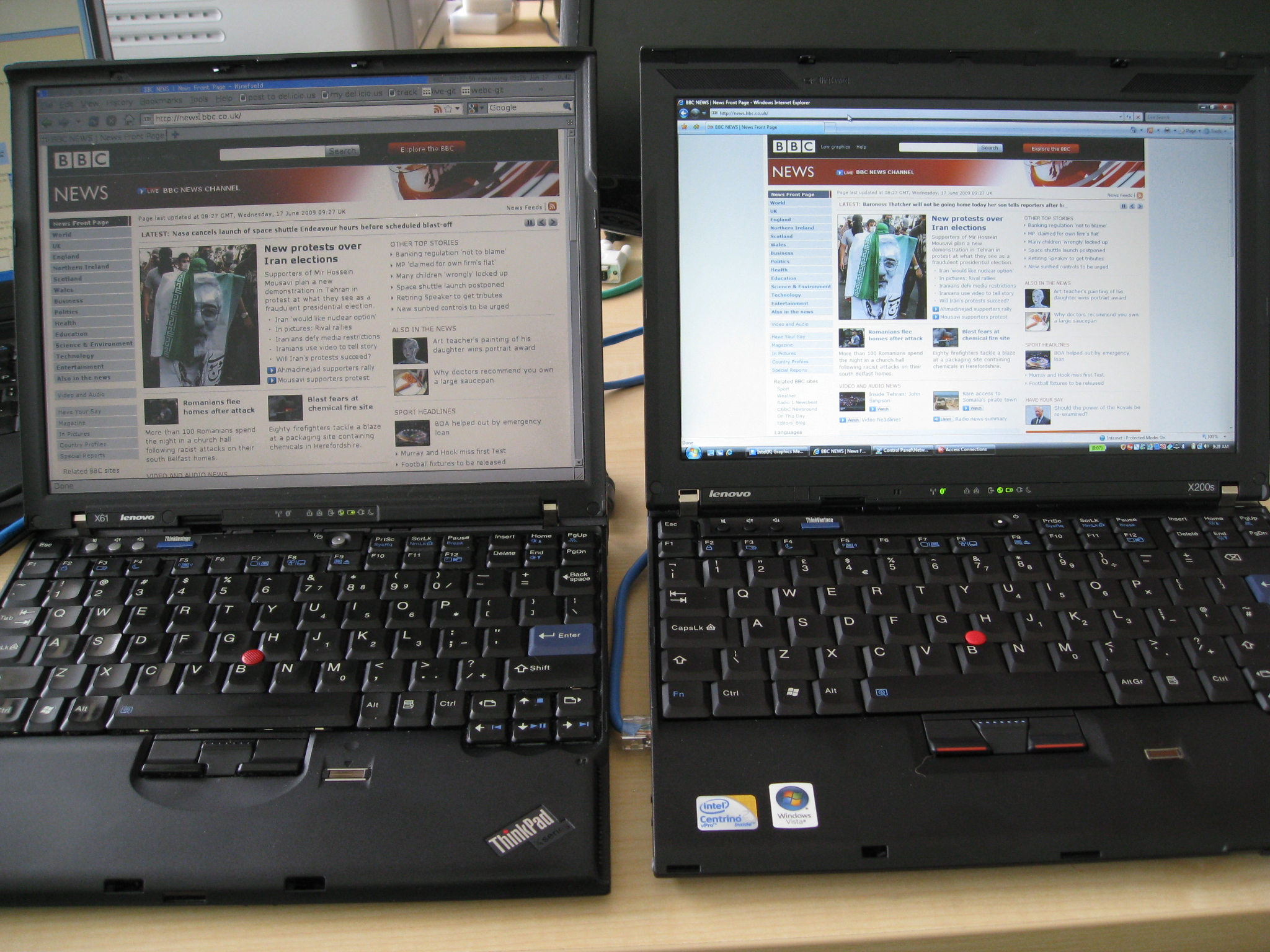
X61 and X200s

The ThinkPad X200 was released on 15 July 2008. It leveraged the new technology from the X300, including the options of a solid-state drive (SSD), an optional integrated camera, 12.1 in (31 cm) widescreen display, optional 3G mobile broadband card, a new 9-cell battery for extended running time up to 9.8 hours, weight as low as 1.34 kg (2.95 lb), and an Intel Core 2 Duo CPU up to 2.66 GHz.

Lenovo released X200s on 23 September 2008. It differed from the standard X200 in being lighter, having longer battery life, and running more quietly due to an "owl fan" design for cooling taken from the X300. The X200s was available with more than half a dozen different CPUs and three screen options; the top of the range was a WXGA+ LED-Backlit TN Panel.

The hardware specifications of the X200 are:
- Processor: Intel Montevina Platform, Core 2 Duo (Penryn) up to 35 W TDP T9600 (2.8 GHz), many MV 25 W CPUs are also available (P8400, P8600, P8700, etc.)
- Chipset: Intel GM45
- Memory: Up to 8192 MiB DDR3 (2 slots)
- Graphics: Intel GMA X4500MHD
- Display: (16∶10) 12.1 in (31 cm) 1280 × 800 CCFL-backlit TN LCD or 1280 × 800 LED-backlit TN LCD (Note: unofficially replaceable by 1440 × 900 (16∶10) CCFL-backlit IPS LCD)
- Battery: 4-, 6-, or 9-cell, up to 10 hours with a 9-cell battery
- Mass/Weight: 1.34 kg / 2.95 lb (with 4-cell), 1.47 kg / 3.24 lb (with 6-cell), 1.63 kg / 3.59 lb (with 9-cell battery)
X200s notable differences:
- Processor: Intel Montevina Platform, Core 2 Duo (Penryn) from ULV SU2300 (1.2 GHz) up to LV SL9600 (2.13 GHz)
- Chipset: Intel GS45
- Display: (16∶10) 12.1 in (31 cm) 1280 × 800 CCFL-backlit TN LCD, or 1280 × 800 LED-backlit TN LCD, or 1440 × 900 LED-backlit TN LCD
- Mass/Weight: 1.1 kg / 2.43 lb (with 4-cell), 1.23 kg / 2.71 lb (with 6-cell), 1.38 kg / 3.04 lb (with 9-cell battery)

Also optional lightweight carbon-reinforced lid;
Optional webcam.

The X200s features cooler components (made possible with the fan design modeled on owl-wings). However, both laptops did not have a touchpad (only the TrackPoint), no HDMI, DVI, or DisplayPort, and no built-in optical drive. The X200 series included tablet PC models, designated by the usage of the "t" suffix, primarily the X230t.

==== X200 Tablet ====
A Lenovo Thinkpad x200 tablet running LMDE 7.

Lenovo released X200 tablet on 9 September 2008. Like other tablet-designated models this added a convertible screen assembly containing a touch digitizer with pen and buttons on the screen front for operating the device without access to keyboard and buttons in converted mode.

==== X300 and X301 ====
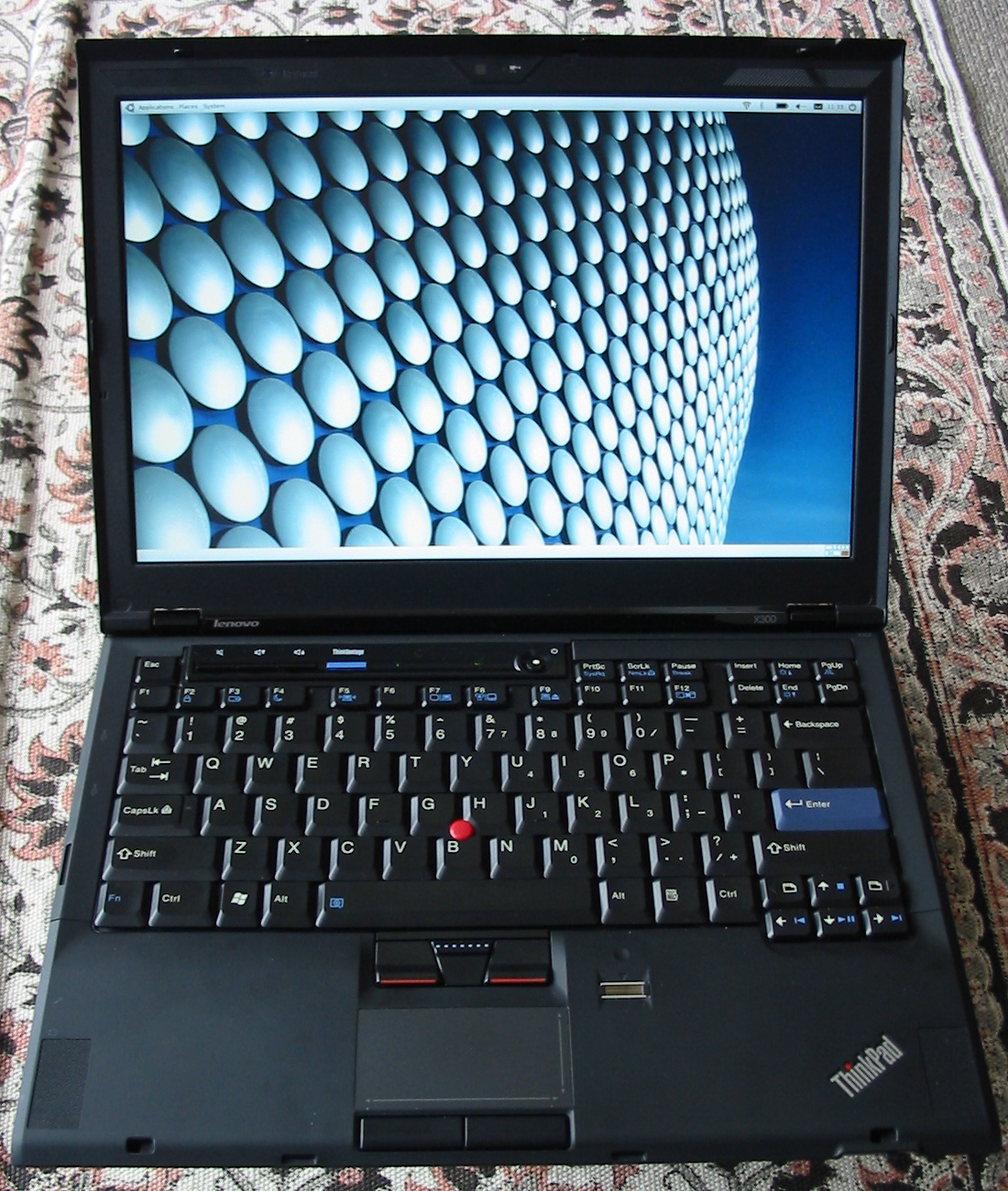
X300

Codenamed "Kodachi", the X300 was released on 26 February 2008. It is distinguished from other ultraportable laptops by its use of LED backlighting, removable battery, solid-state drive, and integrated DVD burner. The ThinkPad X300 used a small form factor Intel GS965 chipset (instead of the standard GM965 chipset), along with the Intel Core 2 Duo L7100 low-voltage CPU (with 12 W Thermal design power (TDP). Its successor, the ThinkPad X301 uses the Intel Centrino 2 mobile platform with GS45 chipset, and an ultra-low-voltage (ULV) CPU. It also integrates GPS, WWAN, and a webcam in the top lid. The thickest part of the laptop is 23 mm (0.92 in), while the thinnest part is 19 mm (0.73 in).

The X300's original internal codename was "Razor", after the then-popular Motorola Razr flip phone. Lenovo noticed that three technologies were converging that would make it possible to build a very thin, light, and fast ThinkPad. The first was solid-state storage, which would replace mechanical hard drives. The second was light-emitting diode (LED) backlighting for flat-panel displays which would improve battery life and image quality. The third was ultrathin optical drives just 7 mm thick, compared to 9.5 mm and 12.7 mm used by previous ThinkPads. The Razor concept was eventually merged with the Bento-Fly project and renamed Kodachi.

The price at the time of the review by Notebook Review was extremely high, and indicated to be out of range for all but corporate users. LAPTOP Magazine awarded the X300 laptop a score of 4.5 stars, among the highest for a ThinkPad X-series laptop.

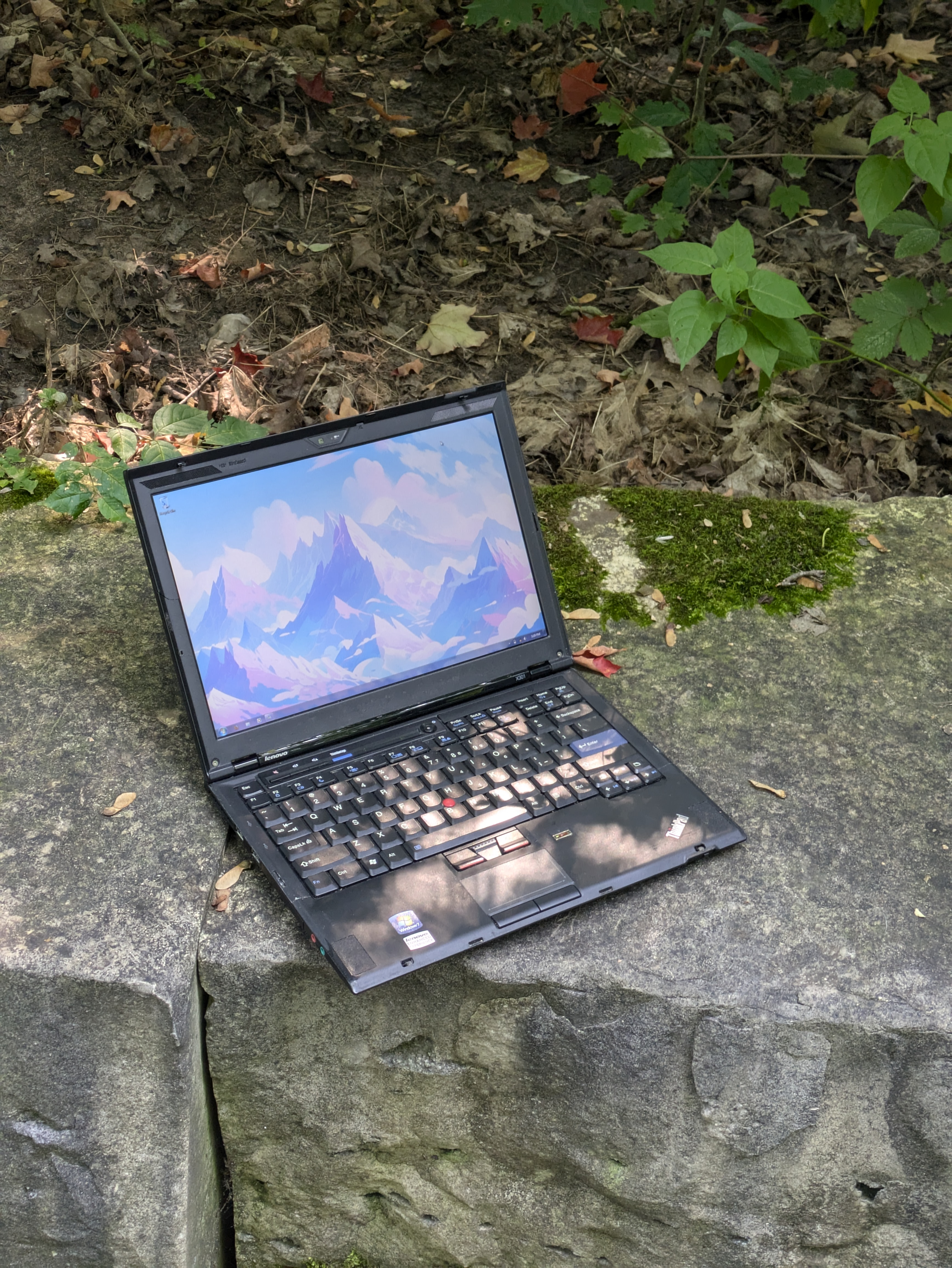
X301

The hardware specifications of the X300 are:
- Processor: 1.2 GHz Intel Core 2 Duo L7100
- Memory: Up to 8192 MiB DDR2 (2 slots)
- Graphics: Intel GMA X3100
- Display: 13.3 in (34 cm) 1440 × 900 (16∶10) LED-backlit TN LCD
- Storage: 1 × SATA 3 Gbit/s (80–250 GB HDD or 64 GiB SSD) (1.8")
- Optical Drive: Ultra-thin DVD Burner (Ultrabay, replaceable by second HDD or additional battery)
- Dimensions: 310 mm × 230 mm × 19 mm–23 mm (12.20 in × 9.06 in × 0.75 in–0.91 in)
- Mass/Weight: starting at 1.33 kg (2.93 lb)
- Operating System: Windows XP Professional
X301 differences:
- Processor: Intel Core 2 Duo U9400 (1.4 GHz) or U9600 (1.6 GHz) (Note: U9600 overclockable with simple hardware modification up to 2.13 GHz.)
- Memory: Up to 8192 MiB DDR3 (2 slots)
- Graphics: Intel GMA X4500MHD
- Storage: 1 × SATA 3 Gbit/s 64 GiB SSD (1.8") only available.

Also additional DisplayPort added.

This laptop was less than an inch thick, making it the thinnest ThinkPad available at the time. The X300 laptop offered a quick boot with SSD. It also offered a built-in optical drive, uncommon in thin and light notebooks. However, the laptop did not include an SD card reader, had no expansion dock capability, and no ExpressCard or PC Card slot.

Model	Release (EU)	Dimensions (mm / in)	Weight ^{(min)}	CPU	Chipset	Memory ^{(max)}	Graphics	Storage	Networking	Audio	Screen	Battery	Other	Operating System
12.1"
X200	2008	295 × 210 × 21–35; 11.61 × 8.27 × 0.83–1.38	1.35 kg (3.0 lb)	Intel Core 2 Duo Penryn; P8400, P8600, P8700... T9600	Intel GM45	8 GiB DDR3 — 1066 MHz (2 slots)	Intel GMA 4500MHD	One 2.5" SATA Drive	Gigabit Ethernet; Wi-Fi Mini PCIe Card; Optional BT 2.1 Module; Optional WWAN Mini PCIe Card (exclusive)		16:10 aspect ratio 1280×800 TN	M(4/6/9)	One white ThinkLight	Windows Vista Business (32/64-bit) Windows XP via Downgrade Rights
X200s	2008	295 × 210 × 21–29; 11.61 × 8.27 × 0.83–1.14	1.1 kg (2.4 lb)	Intel Penryn; Celeron SU2300 (1x 1.2 GHz) or Core 2 Duo up to SL9600 (2x 2.13 GHz)	Intel GM45	8 GiB DDR3 — 1066 MHz (2 slots)	Intel GMA 4500MHD	One 2.5" SATA Drive; Turbo Memory Half Mini PCIe Card (exclusive option)	Gigabit Ethernet; Wi-Fi Mini PCIe Card; Optional BT 2.1 Module; Optional WWAN		style="background: #FFD; color:black; vertical-align: middle; text-align: center; " class="partial table-partial"| 16:10 aspect ratio 1280×800 TN; 1440×900 TN	M(4/6/9)	One white ThinkLight	Windows XP Professional Windows Vista Business (32-bit) Windows 7 Professional (64-bit)
X200 Tablet	2008	295 × 228 × 26.5–33; 11.61 × 8.98 × 1.04–1.30	1.6 kg (3.5 lb)	Intel Core 2 Duo	Intel GM45	8 GiB DDR3 — 1066 MHz (2 slots)	Intel GMA 4500MHD	One 2.5" SATA Drive	Gigabit Ethernet; Wi-Fi Mini PCIe Card; Optional BT 2.1 Module; Optional WWAN		16:10 aspect ratio 1280×800 IPS Touch	M(4/8)		Windows Vista Ultimate (32-bit) Windows Vista Business (32/64-bit) Windows XP Tablet PC 2005 Windows 7 Professional (32/64-bit)
13.3"
X300	2008	318 × 231 × 18.6–23.4; 12.52 × 9.09 × 0.73–0.92	1.43 kg (3.2 lb)	Intel Core Duo SL7100	Intel GS965	8 GiB DDR2 — 667 MHz (2 slots)	Intel GMA X3100	One UltraBay; One 1.8" SATA Drive	Gigabit Ethernet; Wi-Fi Mini PCIe Card; BT 2.0 Module; Optional WWAN Mini PCIe Card (exclusive); Optional UWB Half Mini PCIe Card (exclusive)		style="background: #FFD; color:black; vertical-align: middle; text-align: center; " class="partial table-partial"| 16:10 aspect ratio 1440×900 TN	M(3/6); U	One white ThinkLight	
X301	2008	318 × 231 × 18.6–23.4; 12.52 × 9.09 × 0.73–0.92	1.43 kg (3.2 lb)	Intel Core 2 Duo SU9400 or SU9600	Intel GS45	8 GiB DDR3 — 1066 MHz (2 slots)	Intel GMA 4500MHD	One UltraBay; One 1.8" SATA Drive; Turbo Memory Half Mini PCIe Card (exclusive option)	Gigabit Ethernet; Wi-Fi Mini PCIe Card; BT 2.0 or 2.1 Module; Optional WWAN Mini PCIe Card (exclusive)		style="background: #FFD; color:black; vertical-align: middle; text-align: center; " class="partial table-partial"| 16:10 aspect ratio 1440×900 TN	M(3/6); U	One white ThinkLight	

=== 2010 ===
The X-series laptops released in 2010 from Lenovo were the X100e, X201, X201s, and X201 tablet.

==== X100e and Mini 10 ====
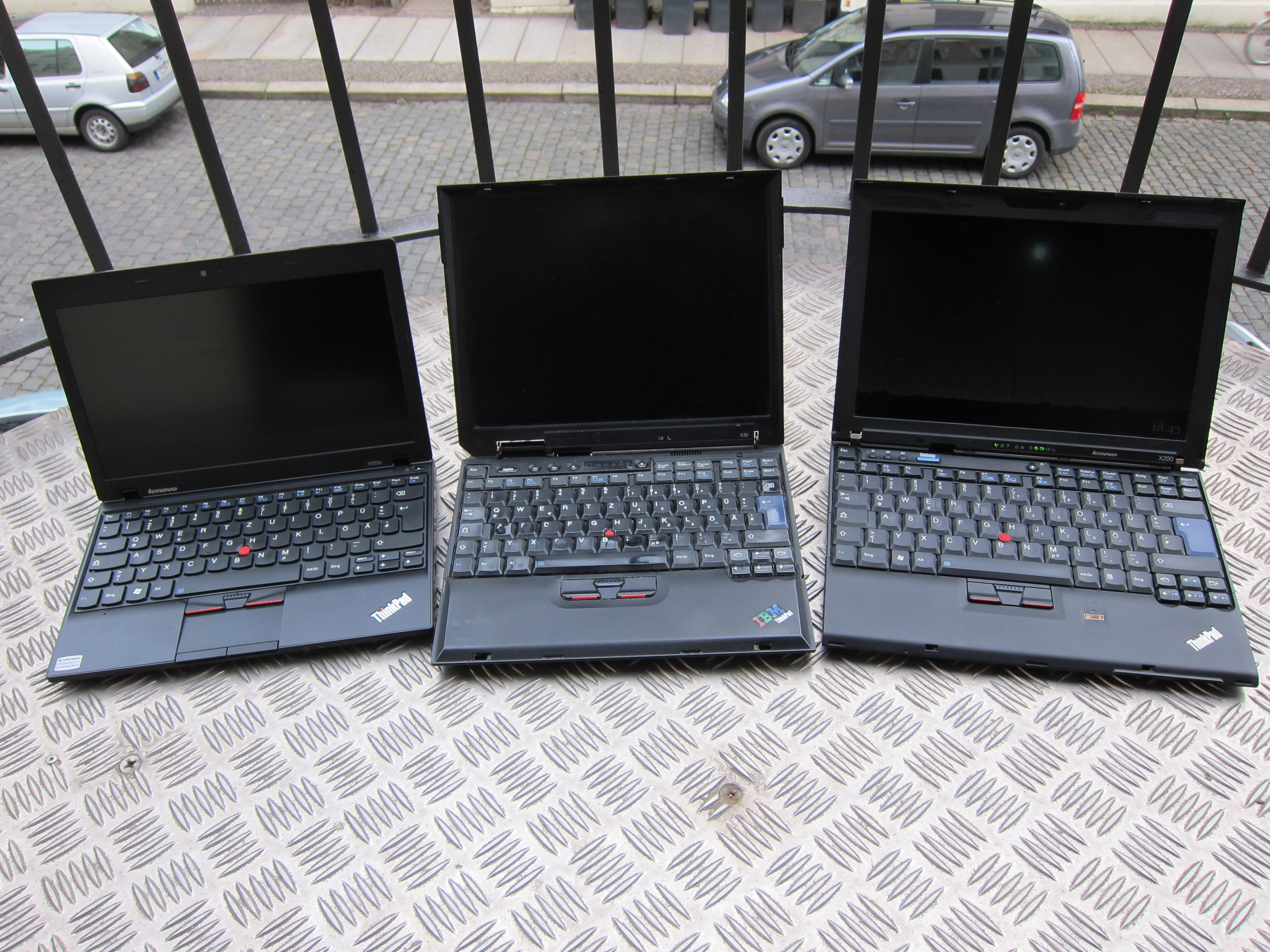
Thinkpad X100e (left) compared to X30 and X200 models

The ThinkPad X100e was released in 2010, with Engadget calling the laptop "the perfect solution between a netbook and a larger 13- or 14-inch ULV ultraportable". Available in two colors (heatwave red and the traditional ThinkPad matte black) the design was compared to that of the Edge series which deviated from traditional ThinkPad design. The X100e, however, despite the choice of colors, retained the "angular edges and boxy build" which "scream traditional ThinkPad design".

The specifications of the X100e laptop are given below:

- Processor: 1.6 GHz AMD Athlon Neo Single-Core MV-40 / 1.6 GHz Dual-Core AMD Athlon Neo X2
- Memory: Up to 4 GiB 667 MT/s DDR2 (2 slots) with 2 GiB fitted as standard
- Graphics: ATI Radeon 3200
- Display: 11.6 in (29 cm) 1366 × 768 (16∶9) LED-backlit TN LCD
- Storage: 1 × SATA 3 Gbit/s (250 GB 5400 RPM)
- 0.3 Mpx webcam, 4-in-1 card reader
- Battery: 6-cell
- Dimensions: 280 mm × 210 mm × 15 mm–30 mm (11.02 in × 8.27 in × 0.59 in–1.18 in)
- Mass/Weight: 1.5 kg (3.3 lb) with a 6-cell battery
- Operating System: Microsoft Windows 7 Professional 32-bit

A modified and re-branded low-cost version of the Lenovo X100e, named the Mini 10 was issued to all Year 9 students in Australia at the start of 2010. They featured an Intel Atom N450 (1.66 GHz) processor, 160 GB HDD, 2 GiB RAM, a 10-inch 1280×720 Screen (fitted in an 11.6-inch frame), 0.3MP Webcam and Windows 7 Enterprise, although they had a COA for Windows XP Home Edition on the bottom.

==== X201, X201i and X201s ====
The main 12-inch line-up only received an internal hardware update and a new palmrest with a touchpad.

The specifications of the X201 are given below:
- Processor: Intel Core i5-540M (2.53 GHz, 3 MB Cache) or i5-520M (2.40 GHz)
- Memory: 4 GiB DDR3 1066 MT/s (2 slots), upgradable to 8 GiB
- Graphics: Intel GMA HD (integrated)
- Display: 12.1 in (31 cm) (1280 × 800 (16∶10) LED-backlit TN LCD
- Storage: 1 × SATA 3 Gbit/s (320 GB 7200 RPM)
- Battery: 4-, 6-, or 9-cell
- Dimensions: 290 mm × 230 mm × 20 mm–36 mm (11.42 in × 9.06 in × 0.79 in–1.42 in)
- Mass/Weight: 1.60 kg (3.52 lb)
- Operating System: Windows 7 Professional (32-bit or 64-bit)
The specifications of the X201s are given below:
- Processor: Intel Core i7-640LM (2.13 GHz)
- Memory: 4 GiB DDR3 1066 MT/s (2 slots), upgradable to 8 GiB
- Graphics: Intel GMA HD (integrated)
- Display: 12.1 in (31 cm) 1440 × 900 (16∶10) LED-backlit TN LCD
- Storage: 1 × SATA 3 Gbit/s (200 GB 5400 RPM)
- Battery: 4-, 6-, or 9-cell
- No webcam or WWAN module
- Dimensions: 290 mm × 210 mm × 20 mm–36 mm (11.42 in × 8.27 in × 0.79 in–1.42 in)
- Mass/Weight: 1.26 kg (2.77 lb)
- Operating System: Windows 7 Professional (64-bit)

The X201i model is a version of the regular X201 with a Core i3 CPU.

==== X201 Tablet ====
The X201 tablet, released in 2010, was criticized by Engadget for its lack of durability, protruding battery, and 33 mm (1.3 in) thick body, while praised for its performance. Notebook Review had similar views about the X201 tablet in terms of both performance and battery life while indicating the display was superior to that of the X201 or X201s.

Model	Release (EU)	Dimensions (mm / in)	Weight ^{(min)}	CPU	Chipset	Memory ^{(max)}	Graphics	Storage	Networking	Audio	Screen	Battery	Other	Operating System
10.1"
X100e (Intel) / Mini 10	2010		1.33 kg (2.9 lb)	Intel Atom N450	Intel; NM10	2 GB DDR2 — 667 MHz (1 slot)	Intel GMA 3150	One 2.5" SATA Drive	Gigabit Ethernet; Wi-Fi Mini PCIe Card; BT 2.1 Module		1280×720	M(6)		Windows XP Home
11.6"														
X100e (AMD)	2010	282 × 209 × 16–30; 11.10 × 8.23 × 0.63–1.18	1.47 kg (3.2 lb)	AMD Athlon Neo	AMD M780G	8 GB DDR2 — 667 MHz (2 slots)	ATI Mobility Radeon HD	One 2.5" SATA Drive	Gigabit Ethernet; Wi-Fi Mini PCIe Card; BT 2.1 Module; Optional WWAN Mini PCIe Card (exclusive)		1366×768	M(6)		Windows 7 Home Premium or Professional (32-bit)
12.1"
X201	2010	295 × 210 × 20.7–35.3; 11.61 × 8.27 × 0.81–1.39	1.31 kg (2.9 lb)	Intel 1st Gen Core i5	Intel QM57	8 GB DDR3 — 1066 MHz (2 slots)	Intel HD Graphics	One 2.5" SATA Drive	Gigabit Ethernet; Wi-Fi Mini PCIe Card; Optional BT 2.1 Module; Optional WWAN Mini PCIe Card (exclusive)		rowspan="2" style="background:#FFB; color:black;vertical-align:middle;text-align:center; " class="table-partial"|16:10 aspect ratio 1280×800	M(4/6/9)	One white ThinkLight	
X201i	2010	295 × 210 × 20.7–35.3; 11.61 × 8.27 × 0.81–1.39	1.31 kg (2.9 lb)	Intel 1st Gen Core i3	Intel QM57	8 GB DDR3 — 1066 MHz (2 slots)	Intel HD Graphics	One 2.5" SATA Drive	Gigabit Ethernet; Wi-Fi Mini PCIe Card; Optional BT 2.1 Module; Optional WWAN Mini PCIe Card (exclusive)			M(4/6/9)	One white ThinkLight	
X201s	2010	295 × 210 × 20.7–28.7; 11.61 × 8.27 × 0.81–1.13	1.1 kg (2.4 lb)	Intel 1st Gen Core	Intel QM57	8 GB DDR3 — 1066 MHz (2 slots)	Intel HD Graphics	One 2.5" SATA Drive	Gigabit Ethernet; Wi-Fi Mini PCIe Card; Optional BT 2.1 Module		style="background: #FFD; color:black; vertical-align: middle; text-align: center; " class="partial table-partial"| 16:10 aspect ratio 1440×900	M(4/6/9)	One white ThinkLight	
X201 Tablet	2010	295 × 228 × 26.5–33.3; 11.61 × 8.98 × 1.04–1.31	1.62 kg (3.6 lb)	Intel 1st Gen Core	Intel QM57	8 GB DDR3 — 1066 MHz (2 slots)	Intel HD Graphics	One 2.5" SATA Drive	Gigabit Ethernet; Wi-Fi Mini PCIe Card; Optional BT 2.1 Module; Optional WWAN Mini PCIe Card (exclusive)		16:10 aspect ratio 1280×800 Pen	M(4/8)		

=== 2011 ===
==== X120e, X121e ====
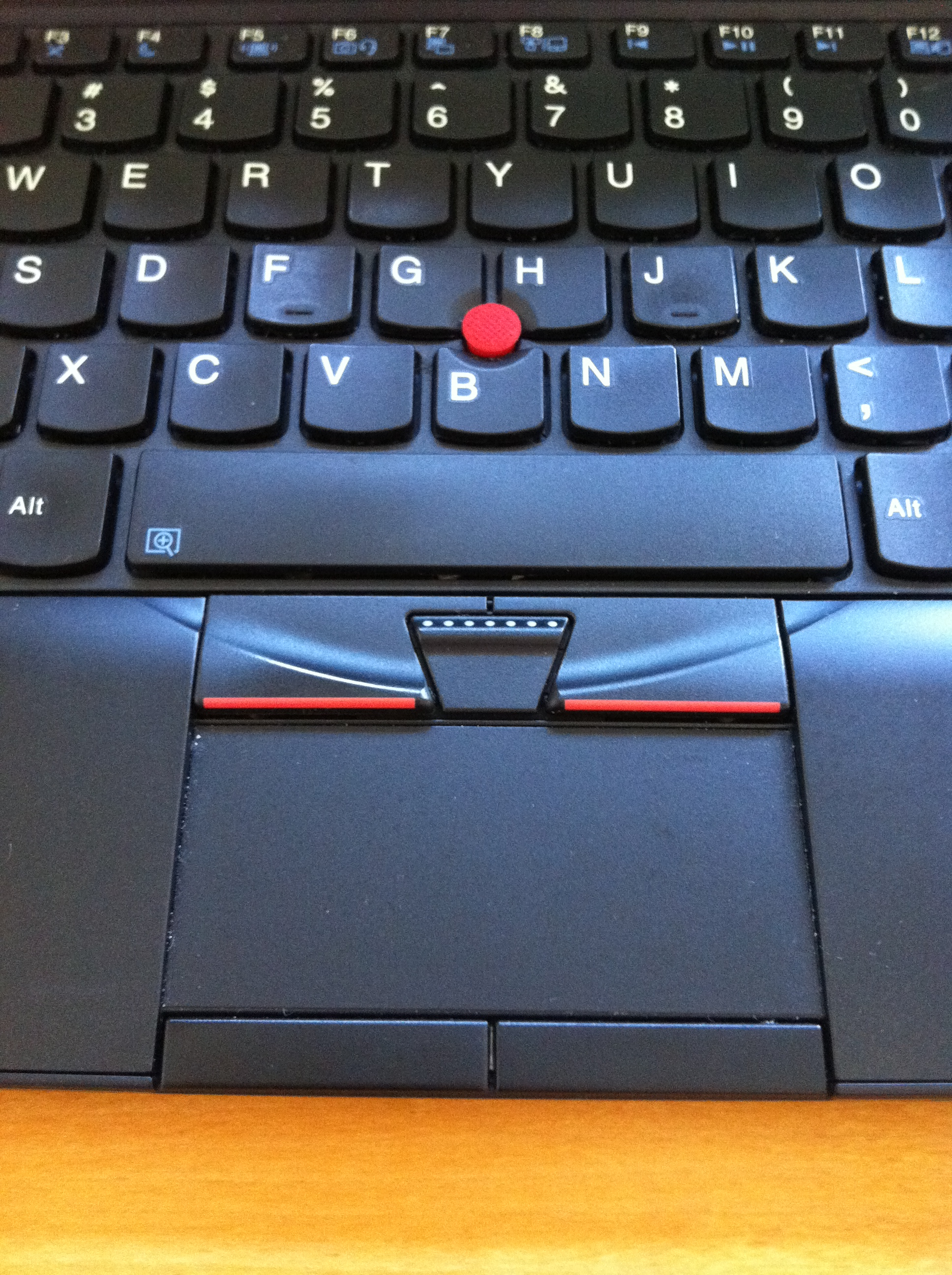
Keyboard and Trackpoint of the X120e

The ThinkPad X120e was released in March 2011. The laptop won Best Affordable Business Ultraportable at CES 2011. The laptop's specifications are given below.

- Battery: 7.5 hours
- Mass/Weight: Starting at 1.33 kg (2.93 lb) with a 3-cell battery.

==== X220 ====
The ThinkPad X220 was released in April 2011 with a new thinner, latchless case, a 16:9 screen and USB 3.0. LAPTOP Magazine received the X220 positively. It was praised for its battery life, performance, low weight, display, keyboard, and significantly improved temperature control. However, the web camera did not receive favor—while images were crisp and clear, colors were reported to be muted.

Engadget said the "all-too-familiar ThinkPad can deceive you with its boring business looks, but it's arguably one of the best laptops we've ever tested". Notebook Review was of the same opinion, stating that the "ThinkPad X220 is quite simply the best 12-inch business notebook we've reviewed so far."

The laptop's specifications are given below:

- Processor: Intel Sandy Bridge, up to a Core i7-2640M
  - Core i3-2310M (2.1 GHz, 3 MB L3 cache)
  - Core i5-2410M (2.3 GHz, 3 MB L3 cache)
  - Core i5-2430M (2.4 GHz, 3 MB L3 cache)
  - Core i5-2520M (2.5 GHz, 3 MB L3 cache)
  - Core i5-2540M (2.6 GHz, 3 MB L3 cache)
  - Core i7-2620M (2.7 GHz, 4 MB L3 cache)
  - Core i7-2640M (2.8 GHz, 4 MB L3 cache)
- Memory: Up to 8 GiB DDR3 1333 MT/s (unofficially up to 16 GiB and 1866 MT/s)
- Graphics: Intel HD Graphics 3000 (12 EUs)
- Display: 12.5 in (32 cm) 1366 × 768 (16∶9) LED-backlit TN or IPS LCD. The X220 was the first non-tablet X series to have an IPS screen option from the factory.
- Storage: 1 × SATA III 6 Gbit/s, 1 × mSATA II 3 Gbit/s
- Battery: Up to 9 hours with a 6-cell battery and up to 15 hours with a 9-cell battery. This battery life can be increased to 23 hours with a 9-cell battery and an external battery pack.
- Mass/Weight: 1.54 kg (3.40 lbs) including the 6-cell battery.
- Dimensions: 305 mm × 206.5 mm × 19 mm–34.6 mm (12.01 in × 8.13 in × 0.75 in–1.36 in)

The X220i uses the same motherboard and chipset as the standard X220 but has a less powerful Intel Core i3 processor, compared to the i5 and i7 options available for the X220. As another cost-reducing measure, the X220i was not offered with an IPS display option.

==== X220 Tablet ====
The X220 Tablet was also released in April 2011. It offered the same specifications as the X220 laptop in terms of processor, graphics, and RAM. The battery life on the X220 tablet was up to nine hours with a 6-cell battery and up to 18 hours with an external battery pack and a 6-cell battery. The starting weight of the tablet was 3.88 lbs.

==== X1 (original) ====
An addition to the lightweight X series, weighing between 1.36 kg to 1.72 kg depending on configuration. It was the thinnest ThinkPad laptop to date at 16.5 (front) and 21.5 mm (rear). The screen is a 13.3-inch (340 mm) LED-backlit HD infinity panel with 1366 × 768 (WXGA) resolution. The base configuration uses an Intel Sandy Bridge 2.5 GHz Core i5-2520M (up to 3.20 GHz) with 4 GiB of RAM (up to 8 GiB), SATA SSD or hard drive, Intel Integrated HD Graphics, USB 3.0, backlit keyboard, 802.11 b/g/n WiFi and an average of eight hours of battery life. The battery is internal and not removable, and there is no optical drive.

The ThinkPad X1 laptop was released by Lenovo in May 2011. Notebook Review offered a positive opinion of the ThinkPad X1, saying that it was, "A powerful notebook that combines the durability and features of a business-class ThinkPad with the style of a consumer laptop." A 13.3-inch X1 ThinkPad was announced to be available in the UK on June 7, 2011.

The specifications of the ThinkPad X1 laptop are given below:

- Processor: Up to Intel Core i7-2620M (2× 2.70 GHz, 4 MiB L3)
- Memory: Up to 8 GiB DDR3 1333 MT/s (1 slot)
- Graphics: Intel HD Graphics 3000 (12 EUs)
- Storage: 1 × SATA III 6 Gbit/s (320 GB 7200 RPM HDD, or an SSD, ranging from 128 GiB to 160 GB)
- Battery: Up to 5.2 hours. This could be extended further to 10 hours with a slice battery.
- Mass/Weight: Starting at 1.69 kg (3.73 lb)
- Dimensions: 340 mm × 230 mm × 17 mm–21 mm (13.39 in × 9.06 in × 0.67 in–0.83 in)

Model	Release (EU)	Dimensions (mm / in)	Weight ^{(min)}	CPU	Chipset	Memory ^{(max)}	Graphics	Storage	Networking	Audio	Screen	Battery	Other	Operating System
11.6"
X120e (Intel)	Mar 2011	282 × 189–210 × 15.6–29.5; 11.10 × 7.44–8.27 × 0.61–1.16	1.33–1.5 kg (2.9–3.3 lb)	AMD Zacate Fusion E-240 or E-350	AMD A50M FCH	16 GB DDR3L — 1333 MHz (2 slots)	AMD Radeon HD 6310M	One 2.5" SATA Drive	Gigabit Ethernet; Wi-Fi Half Mini PCIe Card; Optional BT 3.0 Module; Optional WWAN Mini PCIe Card (exclusive)		1366×768	M(6)		Windows 7 Home Premium (32/64-bit) Windows 7 Professional (64-bit)
X121e (Intel)	Aug 2011	289.6 × 208 × 23.5; 11.40 × 8.19 × 0.93	1.4 kg (3.1 lb)	Intel 2nd Gen Core i3	Intel HM65	16 GB DDR3 — 1333 MHz (2 slots)	Intel HD Graphics 3000	One 2.5" SATA 7mm Drive	Gigabit Ethernet; Wi-Fi Half Mini PCIe Card; BT 3.0 Module; Optional WWAN Half Mini PCIe Card (exclusive)		1366×768	M(6)		
X121e (AMD)	Aug 2011	289.6 × 208 × 23.5; 11.40 × 8.19 × 0.93	1.4 kg (3.1 lb)	AMD C-50, E-300, E-350, or E-450	AMD A50M FCH	16 GB DDR3L — 1333 MHz (2 slots)	AMD Radeon HD 6310M or 6320M	One 2.5" SATA 7mm Drive	Gigabit Ethernet; Wi-Fi Half Mini PCIe Card; BT 3.0 Module; Optional WWAN Half Mini PCIe Card (exclusive)		1366×768	M(6)		
12.5"
X220	Apr 2011	305 × 206.5 × 19.0–26.6; 12.01 × 8.13 × 0.75–1.05	1.35 kg (3.0 lb)	2nd Gen Intel Core	Intel QM67	16 GB DDR3 — 1333 MHz (2 slots)	Intel HD Graphics 3000	One 2.5" SATA 7mm Drive	Gigabit Ethernet; Wi-Fi Half Mini PCIe Card; Optional BT 3.0 Module; Optional WWAN Mini PCIe Card (exclusive)		1366×768	M(9); S		
X220i	Apr 2011	305 × 206.5 × 19.0–26.6; 12.01 × 8.13 × 0.75–1.05	1.35 kg (3.0 lb)	2nd Gen Intel Core i3	Intel QM67	16 GB DDR3 — 1333 MHz (2 slots)	Intel HD Graphics 3000	One 2.5" SATA 7mm Drive	Gigabit Ethernet; Wi-Fi Half Mini PCIe Card; Optional BT 3.0 Module; Optional WWAN Mini PCIe Card (exclusive)		1366×768	M(9); S		
X220 Tablet	May 2011	305 × 228.7 × 27–31.3; 12.01 × 9.00 × 1.06–1.23	1.66 kg (3.7 lb)	2nd Gen Intel Core	Intel QM67	16 GB DDR3 — 1333 MHz (2 slots)	Intel HD Graphics 3000	One 2.5" SATA 7mm Drive	Gigabit Ethernet; Wi-Fi Half Mini PCIe Card; BT 3.0 Module; Optional WWAN		1366×768	M(6); S		
X220i Tablet	May 2011	305 × 228.7 × 27–31.3; 12.01 × 9.00 × 1.06–1.23	1.66 kg (3.7 lb)	2nd Gen Intel Core i3	Intel QM67	16 GB DDR3 — 1333 MHz (2 slots)	Intel HD Graphics 3000	One 2.5" SATA 7mm Drive	Gigabit Ethernet; Wi-Fi Half Mini PCIe Card; BT 3.0 Module; Optional WWAN		1366×768	M(6); S		
13.3"														
X1	June 2011	337 × 231.1 × 16.5–21.3; 13.27 × 9.10 × 0.65–0.84	1.69 kg (3.7 lb)	2nd Gen Intel Core	Intel QM67	8 GB DDR3 1333 MHz (1 slot)	Intel HD Graphics 3000	One 2.5" SATA 7mm Drive	Gigabit Ethernet; Wi-Fi Half Mini PCIe Card; BT 3.0 Module; Optional WWAN		1366×768	m S		Windows 7 Professional (32/64-bit) Windows 7 Home Premium (64-bit)

=== 2012 ===
The ThinkPad X-series laptops released in 2012 by Lenovo were the X1 Carbon, X131e, X230 and X230t (tablet).

In the T, W, and L series the models ThinkPad T430, T430s, T530, W530, L430 and L530 were also released.

The Ins, or Insert key, was removed as an individual key, and instead changed as a function of the End key. To use the Insert key's functionality, one would now need to use the key combo Fn-End, completely eradicating the ability to use Ctrl-Ins - Shift-Ins as an alternative way to use copy and paste.

==== X130e, X131e ====
The X131e is a laptop designed for the education market and comes in three versions: ChromeOS, Windows and DOS. It has a durable case fitted with rubber bumpers and thickened plastic case components to improve its durability. The display is an 11.6 in (29 cm) panel with a 1366 × 768 resolution and an anti-glare coating. It can be customized with various colors, school logos, and asset tagging. The X131e comes in several processor versions: Intel's Celeron/Core i3 and AMD's E1/E2. All models are basically the same as the X130e, with some including SIM card slots for cellular network access and some including Wireless WAN (WWAN) cards.

A special edition laptop was provided for Australian Year 9 students as part of the Digital Education Revolution (DER) program in 2012.

Hardware specifications:

- Processor: Intel Celeron 867 (1.2 GHz dual-core)
- Memory: 4 GiB DDR3
- Storage: 320 GB SATA HDD, with additional SD-card slot
- Display: 11.6 in (29 cm) 1366 × 768 (16∶9) LED-backlit TN LCD
- Integrated 0.3 Mpx camera
- Integrated Wi-Fi and Bluetooth
- Mass/Weight: 1.78 kg (3.9 lb) with 6-cell battery

==== X230 ====
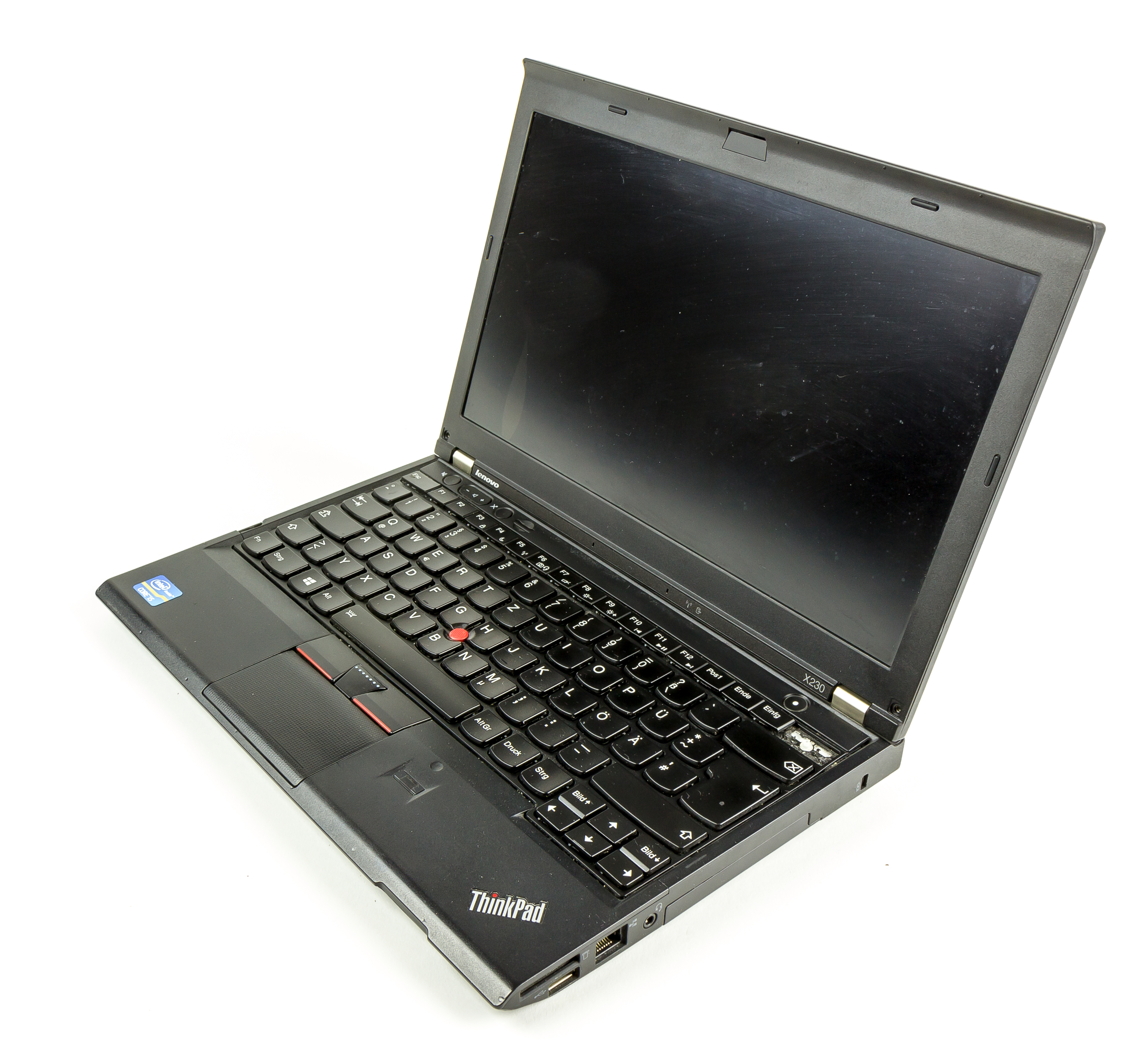
X230 model

The ThinkPad X230 and x230i models were, announced on 15 May 2012, replaced the earlier X220. The X230 and x230i use the same chassis but introduced a new chiclet-style, 6-row keyboard replacing the classic 7-row keyboard style, Ivy Bridge processor. The new keyboard design became a controversial topic in the ThinkPad community along with the locked-down BIOS that discouraged third-party components including batteries or WLAN cards. The Ivy Bridge processors brought performance improvements compared to the X220, and the integrated Intel HD Graphics 4000 is more than capable of delivering a good gaming experience in 4X or classic RTS games. As of 2024, this is one of the last models of the X-Series able to run Libreboot, a Free Software BIOS replacement.

The maximum amount of installable memory is 16 Gib on both the x230 and x230i models in two memory slots, allowing for dual-channel RAM. Just like the X220, it is possible to use an mSATA SSD within the second Mini PCI Express slot instead of a WWAN card.

Specifications:

- Processor: Intel 3rd Generation Core i5/i7 (Ivy Bridge) CPU:
  - Core i7-3520M (2.9 GHz dual-core, 4 MB L3 cache)
  - Core i5-3360M (2.8 GHz dual-core, 3 MB L3 cache)
  - Core i5-3320M (2.6 GHz dual-core, 3 MB L3 cache)
  - Core i5-3210M (2.5 GHz dual-core, 3 MB L3 cache)
- Memory: Up to 16 GiB DDR3 (1600 MT/s, 2 socketed DIMMs)
- Graphics: Intel HD Graphics 4000 (16 EUs)
- Display: 12.5 in (32 cm) 1366 × 768 (16∶9) LED-backlit TN or IPS LCD
- Storage: 1 × SATA III 6 Gbit/s (320 or 500 GB HDD, or 128 or 180 GiB SSD), 1 × mSATA III 6 Gbit/s socket (a WWAN card may be installed instead)
- 720p HD webcam (04f2:b2eb Chicony Electronics Co., Ltd) or 3×3 Antenna Grid

The X230i is just an i3-equipped version of the regular X230 without Bluetooth.

===== X230s =====
The X230s is a China market only model. More akin to later X240 instead of the X230, it gained many of the design cues later found on the X240 and were equipped with Intel 3rd Gen ULV CPUs, a thinner and lighter design while on an Ultrabook, and Power Bridge, which adds a secondary internal battery and allows hot swapping the main external battery without shutting the system down.

==== X230 Tablet ====
The ThinkPad X230 Tablet was announced on 15 May 2012 and replaced the earlier X220 Tablet. The ThinkPad X230t is not compatible with previous series 3 docking stations (4337 and 4338) and is only compatible with the UltraBase series 3 "slice base". The X230t has a touchscreen with stylus support whereas the X230 has no touchscreen. The X230T also has a full size display port whereas the X230 has a mini display port.

==== X1 Carbon 1st Gen ====
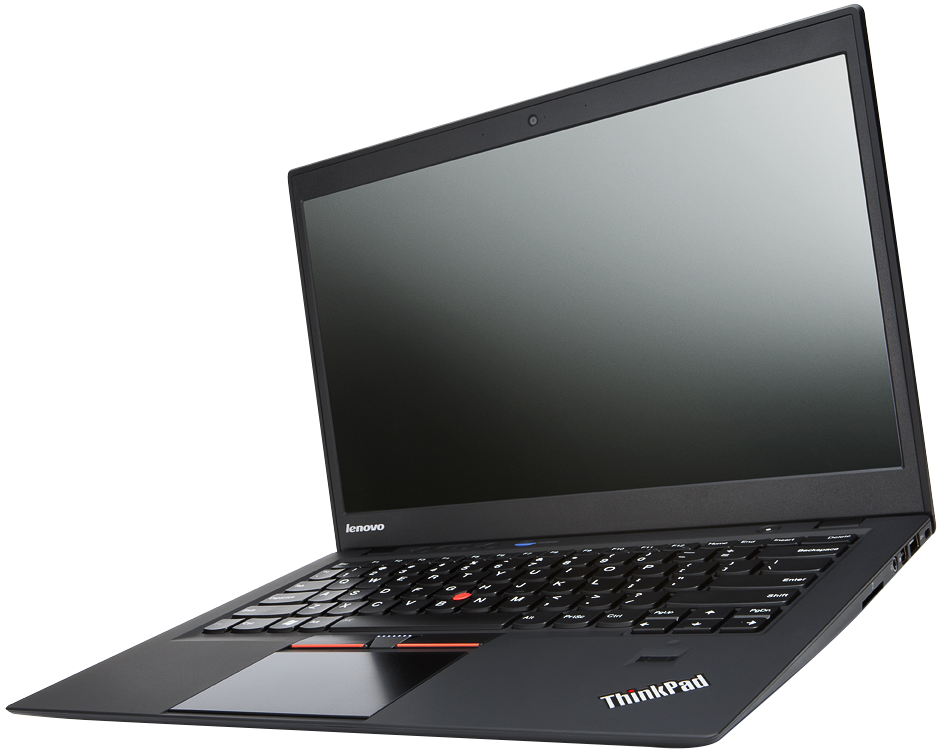
X1 Carbon 1st Gen

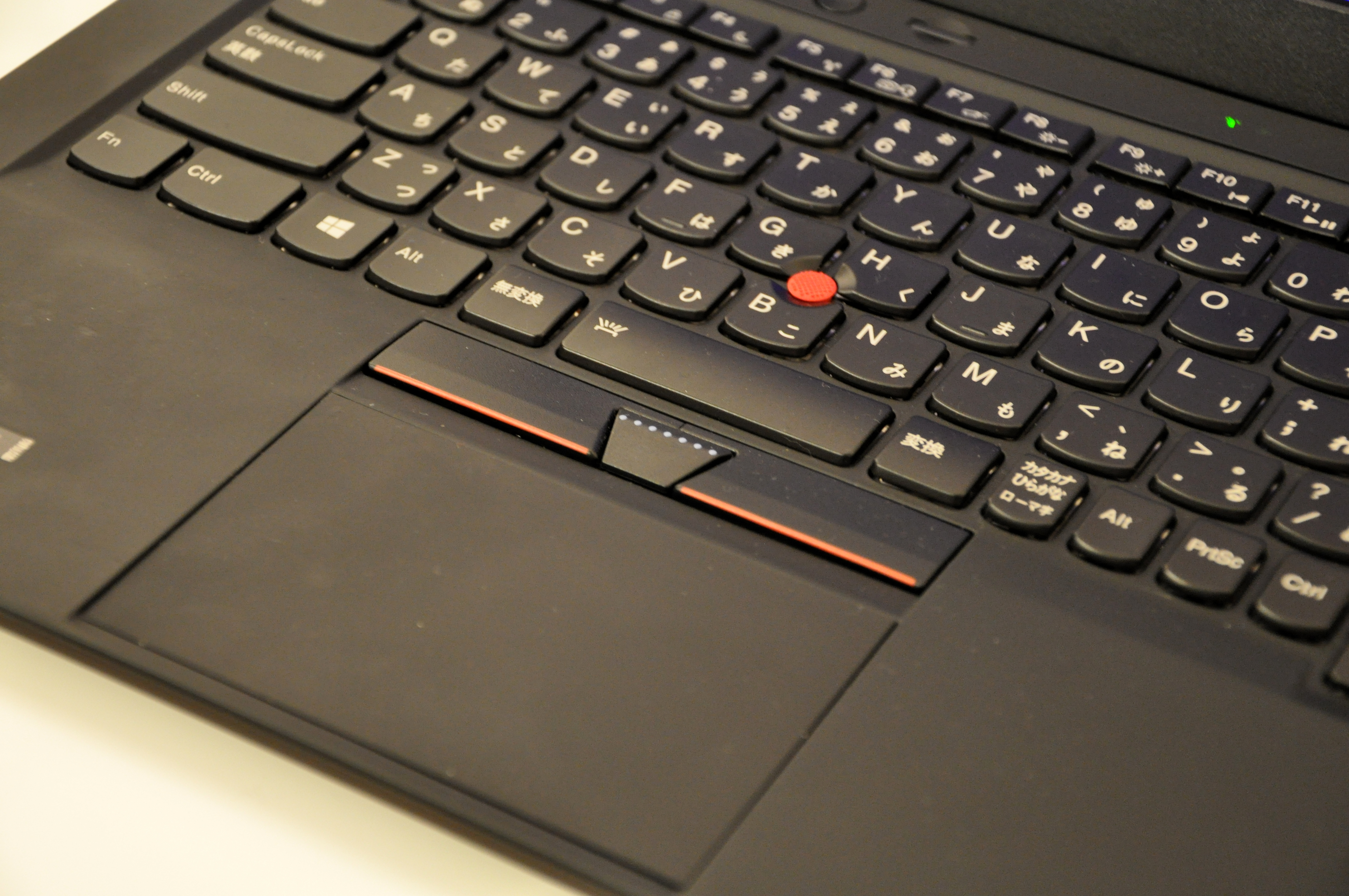
The ThinkPad X1 Carbon's keyboard (Japanese), track point, and touchpad

In early August 2012, Lenovo released the first generation of ThinkPad X1 Carbon announced on 15 May 2012. The X1 Carbon weighs 1.35 kg (3.0 lb), has a battery life of roughly eight hours, and has a start-up time of less than 20 seconds. The X1 Carbon was first released in China because of the popularity of ThinkPads in that market.

The first X1 Carbon featured only an M.2 SSD instead of a 2.5" hard drive bay. The base model has 4 GiB of memory, an Intel Core i5-3317U processor, and a 128 GiB SSD. The most expensive model has an Intel Core i7 processor and a 256 GiB SSD. The X1 Carbon requires a dongle to connect an Ethernet cable, and some models include a 3G cellular modem.

The first-generation X1 Carbon has a 14 in (36 cm) TN-panel LCD with a resolution of 1600 × 900 (16∶9 aspect ratio). The X1 Carbon weighs 1.36 kg (3.0 lb) and measures 331 mm × 226 mm × 19 mm (13.03 in × 8.9 in × 0.74 in). The X1 Carbon's case is made of light carbon fiber and has a matte black finish. The Carbon is also marketed "as the thinnest 14" ultrabook.

In a review published for CNET, Dan Ackerman wrote, "At first glance, the ThinkPad X1 Carbon looks a lot like other ThinkPads, but in the hand it stands out as very light and portable. The excellent keyboard shows up other ultrabooks, and the rugged build quality is reassuring. With a slightly boosted battery and maybe a lower starting price, this could be a serious contender for my all-around favorite thin laptop."

Peter Bright wrote a disparaging review for Ars Technica. He found the new X1 Carbon with the "Adaptive Keyboard" to be near perfect but unusable because the keyboard was so non-standard when compared with that of a desktop or the older ThinkPad T410s and Lenovo Helix keyboards. As a touch typist, he despaired at the removal of the function keys, and the layout. He cited the repositioning of the ⇪ Caps Lock key, replacing it with Home/End, and the positioning of the ← Backspace and Delete keys.

In November 2012, Lenovo announced a touch-screen variant called the ThinkPad X1 Carbon Touch designed for use with Windows 8. Its display makes use of multi-touch technology that can detect simultaneous inputs from up to ten fingers. On the performance of the X1 Carbon Touch's SSD, Engadget states, "The machine boots into the Start screen in 11 seconds, which is pretty typical for a Windows 8 machine with specs like these. We also found that the solid-state drive delivers equally strong read and write speeds (551 MB/s and 518 MB/s, respectively), which we noticed the last time we tested an Ultrabook with an Intel SSD."

Model	Release (EU)	Dimensions (mm / in)	Weight ^{(min)}	CPU	Chipset	Memory ^{(max)}	Graphics	Storage	Networking	Audio	Screen	Battery	Other	Operating System
11.6"
X130e (Intel)	2012	293.4 × 216 × 24.8; 11.55 × 8.50 × 0.98	1.78 kg (3.9 lb)	Intel Celeron 867; Intel Core i3-2367M	Intel HM65	16 GB DDR3L — 1333 MHz (2 slots)	Intel HD Graphics 3000	One 2.5" SATA Drive	Gigabit Ethernet; Wi-Fi Half Mini PCIe Card; Optional BT 3.0 Module; Optional WWAN Mini PCIe Card (exclusive)		rowspan="2" style="background:#FFB; color:black;vertical-align:middle;text-align:center; " class="table-partial"|1366×768	M(6)		
X130e (AMD)	2012	293.4 × 216 × 24.8; 11.55 × 8.50 × 0.98	1.78 kg (3.9 lb)	AMD E-300 or E-450	AMD A50M FCH	16 GB DDR3L — 1333 MHz (2 slots)	AMD Radeon 6310 or 6320	One 2.5" SATA Drive	Gigabit Ethernet; Wi-Fi Half Mini PCIe Card; Optional BT 3.0 Module; Optional WWAN Mini PCIe Card (exclusive)			M(6)		
12.5"
X230	May 2012	305 × 206.5 × 19.0–26.6; 12.01 × 8.13 × 0.75–1.05	1.34 kg (3.0 lb)	3rd Gen Intel Core	Intel QM77	16 GB DDR3 — 1600 MHz (2 slots)	Intel HD Graphics 4000	One 2.5" SATA 7mm Drive	Gigabit Ethernet; Wi-Fi Half Mini PCIe Card; Optional BT 4.0 Module; Optional WWAN Mini PCIe Card (exclusive)		rowspan="2" style="background:#FFB; color:black;vertical-align:middle;text-align:center; " class="table-partial"|1366×768	M(4/6/9); 28.8Wh / 62.4Wh / 93.6Wh; S		
X230i	May 2012	305 × 206.5 × 19.0–26.6; 12.01 × 8.13 × 0.75–1.05	1.34 kg (3.0 lb)	3rd Gen Intel Core i3	Intel QM77	16 GB DDR3 — 1600 MHz (2 slots)	Intel HD Graphics 4000	One 2.5" SATA 7mm Drive	Gigabit Ethernet; Wi-Fi Half Mini PCIe Card; Optional BT 4.0 Module; Optional WWAN Mini PCIe Card (exclusive)			M(4/6/9); 28.8Wh / 62.4Wh / 93.6Wh; S		
X230 Tablet	May 2012	305 × 228.7 × 27–31.3; 12.01 × 9.00 × 1.06–1.23	1.66 kg (3.7 lb)	3rd Gen Intel Core	Intel QM77	16 GB DDR3 — 1600 MHz (2 slots)	Intel HD Graphics 4000	One 2.5" SATA 7mm Drive	Gigabit Ethernet; Wi-Fi Half Mini PCIe Card; Optional BT 4.0 Module; Optional WWAN Mini PCIe Card (exclusive)		rowspan="2" style="background:#FFB; color:black;vertical-align:middle;text-align:center; " class="table-partial"|1366×768	M(3/6); 30Wh / 66Wh; S(6/6+); 64Wh / ? Wh		
X230i Tablet	May 2012	305 × 228.7 × 27–31.3; 12.01 × 9.00 × 1.06–1.23	1.66 kg (3.7 lb)	3rd Gen Intel Core i3	Intel QM77	16 GB DDR3 — 1600 MHz (2 slots)	Intel HD Graphics 4000	One 2.5" SATA 7mm Drive	Gigabit Ethernet; Wi-Fi Half Mini PCIe Card; Optional BT 4.0 Module; Optional WWAN Mini PCIe Card (exclusive)			M(3/6); 30Wh / 66Wh; S(6/6+); 64Wh / ? Wh		

=== 2013 ===
The ThinkPad X Series laptops released in 2013 by Lenovo were the X131e Chromebook, X240 and ThinkPad Helix (Convertible tablet).

==== X131e Chromebook ====
The Chromebook version of the X131e was released in early 2013. It also has less powerful internals due to it running ChromeOS.

==== X240 and X240s ====
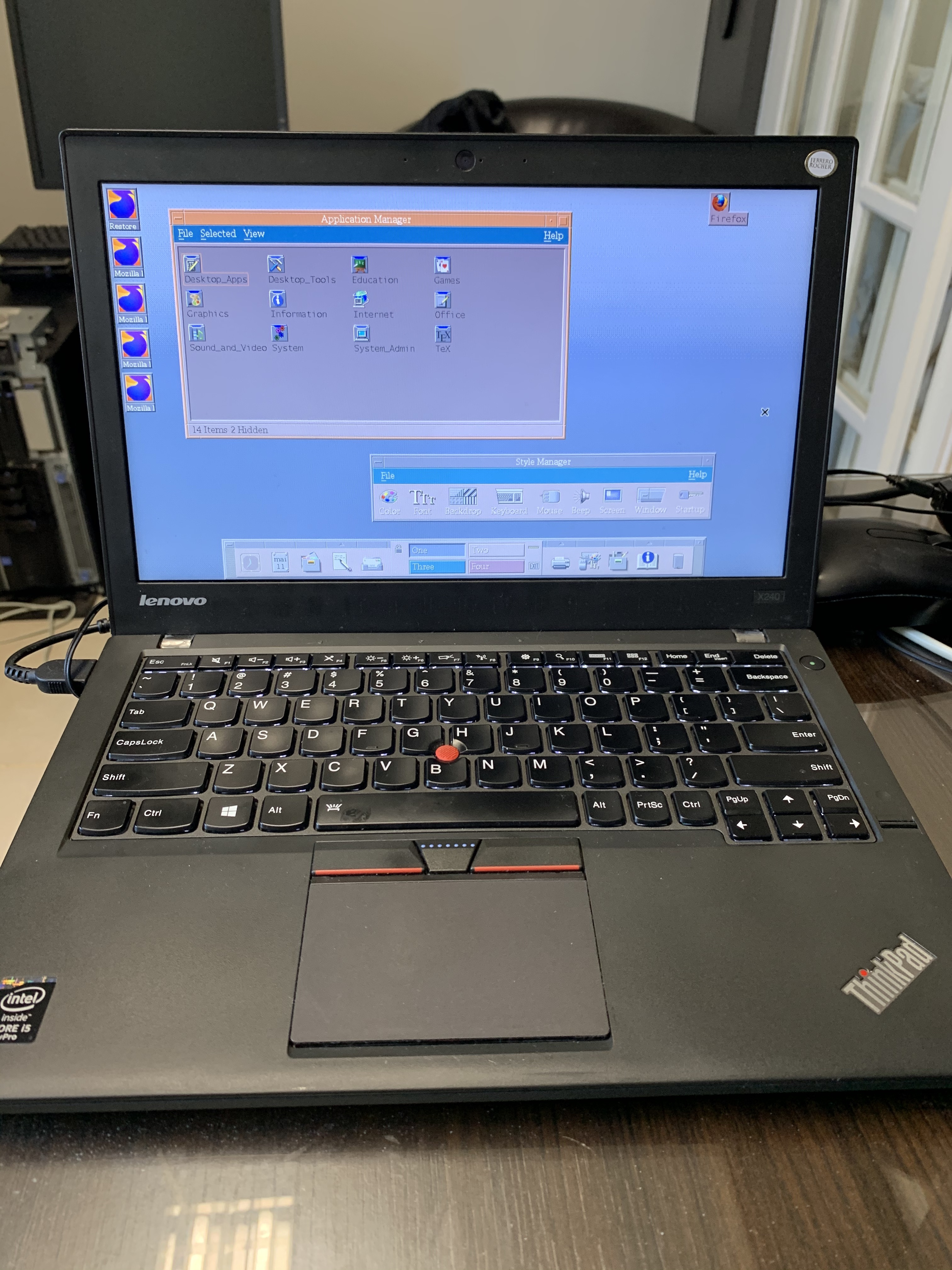
X240 (with X250 touchpad)

The ThinkPad X240 replaced the earlier X230 and X230s. Compared to the X230, the X240 changed from the higher-power Intel Core CPUs labelled as "mobile class", to the lower-power CPUs labelled "ultrabook class". Depending on the CPU model, the change resulted in a 10%–20% reduction in CPU performance compared to the older, but higher power Ivy Bridge generation CPUs. This was the first X-series laptop to forgo the classic TrackPoint buttons in favor of a touchpad that can also be pushed. The X240 reduced the maximum physical memory to 8 GiB, with only one memory slot, making dual-channel unavailable (compared to 16 GiB dual-channel in two memory slots on the X230), lost the dedicated insert key and volume control keys. The X240 uses the rectangular "slim tip" power plug. X240 has two double batteries. And also the touchpads on the X240 range were emphasized on YouTube channels like Laptop Retrospective as feeling like paper and that's why the X250 touchpads were commonly fitted on X240 models for improved clicking and satisfaction of a good touchpad.

The X240s is a slimmed down and lighter, Asian-market-only version of the X240 with the docking port missing and Power Bridge hot-swappable battery replaced with two internal batteries rated at 23.5 Wh each, which by extension removes the option to install larger 6-cell batteries in place of the default 3-cell.

==== Helix ====
The ThinkPad Helix was released as an option for corporate IT buyers who were looking for the power of a high-end Ultrabook and the mobility of a tablet. The ThinkPad Helix featured a tablet powered by Ivy Bridge components, a docking keyboard, and a Wacom digitizer stylus.

Model	Release (US)	Dimensions (mm / in)	Weight ^{(min)}	CPU	Chipset	Memory ^{(max)}	Graphics	Storage	Networking	Audio	Screen	Battery	Other	Operating System
11.6"
X131e (Intel)	Feb 2013	293.4 × 216 × 32.3; 11.55 × 8.50 × 1.27	1.78 kg (3.9 lb)	Intel Celeron or 3rd Gen Core i3 i3-2367M i3-3227U	Intel HM77	16(M)/32(U) GB DDR3L — 1333(M)/1600(U) MHz (2 slots)	Intel HD Graphics 3000 or 4000	One 2.5" SATA 7mm Drive	Gigabit Ethernet; Wi-Fi + BT Half Mini PCIe Card; Optional WWAN		Anti-glare: 1366×768 TN 200 nits	M(6); 62.4Wh		
X131e (AMD)	Feb 2013	293.4 × 216 × 32.3; 11.55 × 8.50 × 1.27	1.78 kg (3.9 lb)	AMD; E1-1200; E2-1800	AMD A68M FCH	32 GB DDR3L — 1600 MHz (2 slots)	AMD Radeon HD 7310 or 7340	One 2.5" SATA 7mm Drive	Gigabit Ethernet; Wi-Fi + BT Half Mini PCIe Card; Optional WWAN		Anti-glare: 1366×768 TN 200 nits	M(6); 62.4Wh		
12.5"
X240	Oct 2013	305.5 × 208.5 × 19.9; 12.03 × 8.21 × 0.78	1.31 kg (2.9 lb)	4th Gen Intel Core		16 GB DDR3L — 1600 MHz (1 slot)	Intel HD Graphics 4400	One 2.5" SATA; One M.2 SATA (conflicting)	Gigabit Ethernet; Wi-Fi + BT M.2 Card; Optional WWAN M.2		Anti-glare: 1366×768 TN 200 nits 1366×768 IPS 300 nits 1920×1080 IPS 400 nits 1920×1080 IPS Touch	M(3/6/6); 23/48/72Wh m(3); 23Wh		
X240s	Aug 2013	305.5 × 208.5 × 17.7; 12.03 × 8.21 × 0.70		4th Gen Intel Core		16 GB DDR3L — 1600 MHz (1 slot)	Intel HD Graphics 4400	One M.2 SATA	No Onboard Ethernet; Wi-Fi + BT M.2 Card		Anti-glare: 1366×768 TN 200 nits 1366×768 IPS 300 nits 1920×1080 IPS 400 nits 1920×1080 IPS Touch	m(3); 23.5Wh m(3); 23.5Wh		

=== 2014 ===
==== X140e ====
The X140e is the last ThinkPad with a classic round power plug.

Model	Release (US)	Dimensions (mm / in)	Weight ^{(min)}	CPU	Chipset	Memory ^{(max)}	Graphics	Storage	Networking	Audio	Screen	Battery	Other	Operating System
11.6"
X140e	Dec 2014	293.4 × 216 × 35; 11.55 × 8.50 × 1.38	1.78 kg (3.9 lb)	AMD; E1-2500; A4-5000		32 GB DDR3L — 1600 MHz (2 slots)	AMD Radeon HD 8240 or 8330	One 2.5" SATA 7mm Drive	Gigabit Ethernet; Wi-Fi + BT	HD Audio and Realtek ALC3202 with stereo speakers within Dolby Advanced Audio, monaural digital microphone and combo audio/mic jack	Anti-glare: 1366×768 TN 200 nits	M(6); 62.4Wh		Windows 7 Professional 64 preinstalled through downgrade rights in Windows 8 / 8.1 Pro 64-bit

=== 2015 ===
There were 2 Lenovo X-series laptops released in 2015, at CES.

==== X250 ====
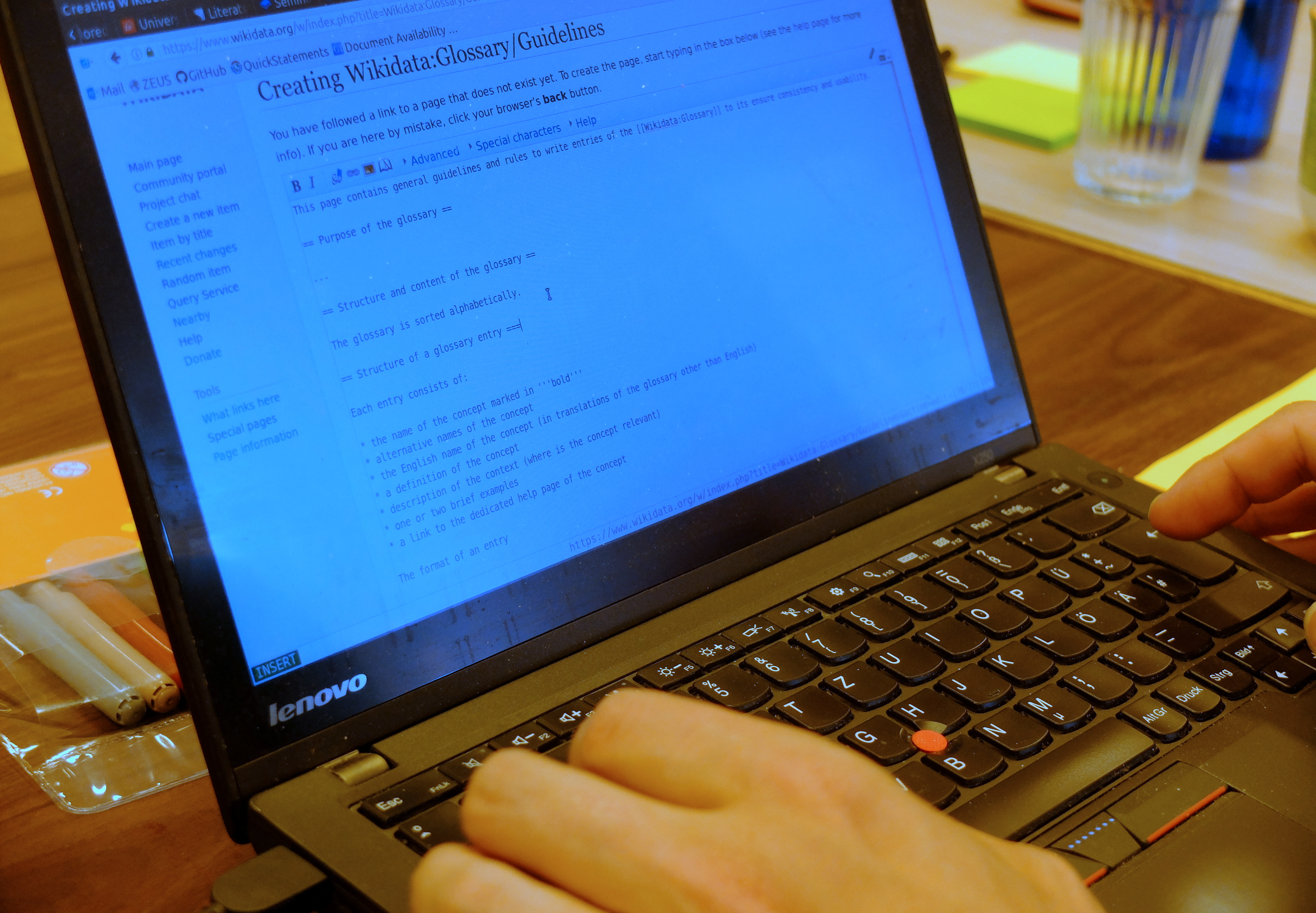
X250 Touch

The ThinkPad X250 laptop was released in 2015 by Lenovo during the CES congress. The ThinkPad X250 came with Broadwell i3, i5, or i7 processors and was the replacement for the X240 and X240s. The X250 saw a return of separate TrackPoint buttons. The X250 uses the rectangular power plug. A touch screen was available for this model in a 12.5 inch screen; either TN HD or Full HD IPS. It weighs 1.31 kg (2.9 lbs) & supports up to 16GB of RAM, up from the X240.

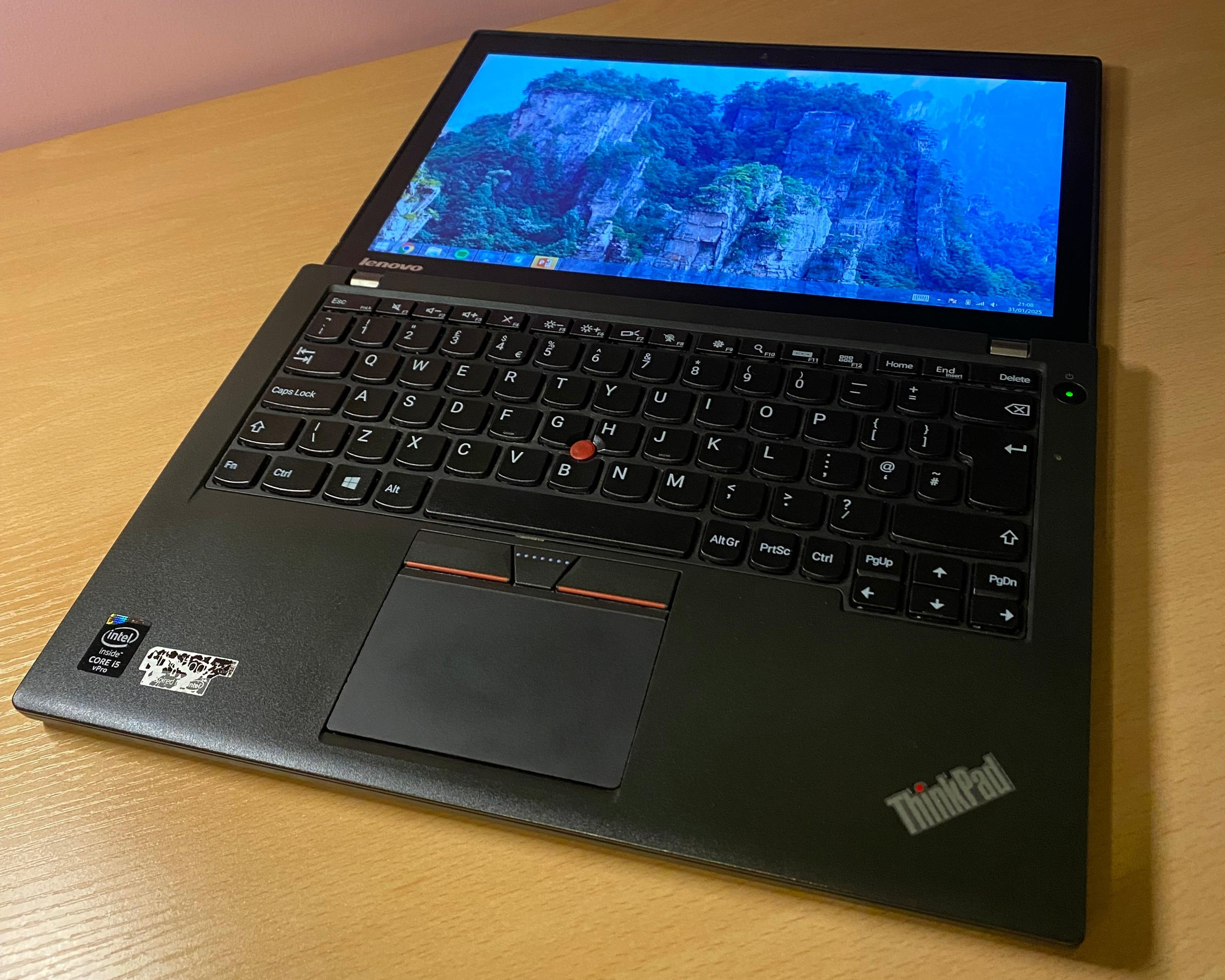
Lenovo X250 Touch at 180°

It was received well, with Notebookcheck giving a score of 85/100 but some criticised its large borders, lack of USB-C and a price starting at around £600.

Specifications:

- CPU Options - Intel 5th Gen Broadwell i3/i5/i7:
  - Intel Core i7-5600U (2.6 GHz base, 3.2 GHz boost, 4MB cache)
  - Intel Core i7-5500U (2.4 GHz base, 3.0 GHz boost, 4MB cache)
  - Intel Core i5-5300U (2.3 GHz base, 2.9 GHz boost, 3MB cache)
  - Intel Core i5-5200U (2.2 GHz base, 2.7 GHz boost, 3MB cache)
  - Intel Core i3-5010U (2.1 GHz base, no turbo boost, 3MB cache)
  - Intel Core i3-5005U (2.0 GHz base, no turbo boost, 3MB cache)
  - Intel Celeron 3755U (1.7 GHz base, no turbo boost, 2MB cache)
  - Intel Celeron 3205U (1.5 GHz base, no turbo boost, 2MB cache)
- Graphics - Integrated:
  - Integrated Intel HD Graphics 5500 (for i7/i5/i3s)
  - Integrated Intel HD Graphics (for Celeron CPUs)
- RAM - DDR3L-1600:
  - 4GB (soldered or single SO-DIMM)
  - 8GB
  - 16GB (1 SO-DIMM slot, upgradeable)
- Storage - 2.5inch SATA SSD/HDD:
  - 320GB / 500GB / 1TB HDD (5400RPM or 7200RPM)
  - 128GB / 256GB / 512GB SATA SSD M.2 Slot (on some models)
    - Some models include an M.2 2242 SSD (128GB or 256GB)
- Display - 12.5inch with optional touchscreen:
  - HD (1366×768) TN, 200 nits
  - HD (1366×768) IPS, 300 nits
  - FHD (1920×1080) IPS, 300 nits
- Battery:
  - Internal 3-cell (23.2Wh) battery (non-removable)
  - Removable 3-cell (23.2Wh) or 6-cell (48Wh or 72Wh) battery
  - Maximum Battery Life: Up to 20 hours (with extended 6-cell battery)
  - Charger: 45W or 65W Lenovo Slim Tip power adapter
- Ports:
  - USB:
    - 2 × USB 3.0 ports (one always-on)
  - Video/Audio:
    - Mini DisplayPort 1.2
    - VGA
    - 3.5mm combo headphone/microphone jack
  - Networking:
    - Ethernet
    - Optional WWAN
    - Intel Dual Band Wi-Fi (802.11ac or 802.11n)
    - Bluetooth 4.0
  - Also Included:
    - SD Card Reader
    - Smart Card Reader (optional)
    - Docking Station Connector
- Dimensions/Weight:
  - Weight: ~1.3 kg (2.9 lbs) with standard battery
  - Dimensions: 305.5 x 208.5 x 20.3mm (12 x 8.2 x 0.8 inches)

X1 Carbon 3rd Gen

The 3rd-generation ThinkPad X1 Carbon was released by Lenovo in early 2015 as part of the X1 Carbon line-up and was the successor to the 2nd generation. It featured Intel Broadwell i5 and i7 processors. This model retained the carbon fiber chassis, weighing around 1.31 kg (2.9 lbs), and offered a 14-inch display in either TN FHD (1920×1080) or IPS WQHD (2560×1440), the IPS having a touchscreen option. Generation 3 brought back the physical function keys instead of the adaptive touch bar.

The X1 Carbon (3rd Gen) was generally well-received for its lightweight design, solid build, and improved battery life. However, some reviewers criticised the limited port selection without Ethernet or USB-C, soldered RAM up to 8GB, and high starting price, at around £1,200.

Model	Release (US)	Dimensions (mm / in)	Weight ^{(min)}	CPU	Chipset	Memory ^{(max)}	Graphics	Storage	Networking	Audio	Screen	Battery	Other	Operating System
12.5"
X250	2015	305.5 × 208.5 × 20.3; 12.03 × 8.21 × 0.80	1.31 kg (2.9 lb)	4th or 5th Gen Intel Core		16 GB DDR3L — 1600 MHz (1 slot)	Intel HD Graphics 4400 or 5500 (5th Gen)	One 2.5" SATA; One M.2 SATA (conflicting)	Gigabit Ethernet; Wi-Fi + BT M.2 Card; Optional WWAN M.2 SATA Card		style="background-color: var(--background-color-base, #fff); color:var(--color-base, #202122); vertical-align: middle; text-align: center; " class="table-no" | Anti-glare: 1366×768 TN; 1366×768 IPS; 1920×1080 IPS; 1920×1080 IPS Touch	M(3/6/6); 23/48/72Wh m(3); 23Wh		

=== 2016 ===
==== X260 ====
The ThinkPad X260 laptop was released in 2016 by Lenovo during the CES congress and replaced the earlier ThinkPad X250. The ThinkPad X260 adopts the Skylake processors, adds an additional USB 3.0 port, but USB-C is missing. and replaces the VGA port with an HDMI port in addition to the existing Mini DisplayPort port. Lenovo claims the X260 can achieve battery life of 21.5 hours from a full charge.

Model	Release (US)	Dimensions (mm / in)	Weight ^{(min)}	CPU	Chipset	Memory ^{(max)}	Graphics	Storage	Networking	Audio	Screen	Battery	Other	Operating System
12.5"														
X260	2016	305.5 × 208.5 × 20.3; 12.03 × 8.21 × 0.80	1.34 kg (3.0 lb)	6th Gen Intel Core		32 GB DDR4 — 2133 MHz (1 slot)	Intel HD Graphics 520	One 2.5" SATA or One M.2 x2	Gigabit Ethernet; Wi-Fi + BT M.2 Card; Optional WWAN M.2 card (?)		style="background-color: var(--background-color-base, #fff); color:var(--color-base, #202122); vertical-align: middle; text-align: center; " class="table-no" | Anti-glare: 1366×768 TN; 1366×768 IPS; 1920×1080 IPS	M(3/6/6); 23/48/72Wh m(3); 23Wh		

=== 2017 ===
==== X270 ====
The 12.5 in (32 cm) ThinkPad X270 was announced in December 2016 with TN and IPS displays available in HD and FHD as well as a FHD touch screen option. Lenovo claims the X270 can achieve more than 20 hours of battery life from a full charge. It includes one USB-C port supporting USB 3.1 Gen 1 speed (5 Gbit/s) and PD (charging via USB-C), HDMI, two USB Type-A 3.0 ports, one of which is "always on", allowing users to charge items plugged in while the laptop is off or asleep.

==== A275 ====
The A275 is a version of the X270 with an AMD processor and some other differences.

Model	Release (US)	Dimensions (mm / in)	Weight ^{(min)}	CPU	Chipset	Memory ^{(max)}	Graphics	Storage	Networking	Audio	Screen	Battery	Other	Operating System
12.5"
X270	2017	305.5 × 208.5 × 20.3; 12.03 × 8.21 × 0.80	1.27 kg (2.8 lb)	6th or 7th Gen Intel Core		32 GB DDR4 — 2133 MHz (1 slot)	Intel HD Graphics 520 or 620 (7th Gen)	One 2.5" SATA 7mm or One M.2 x2	Gigabit Ethernet; Wi-Fi + BT M.2 Card; Optional WWAN		style="background-color: var(--background-color-base, #fff); color:var(--color-base, #202122); vertical-align: middle; text-align: center; " class="table-no" | Anti-glare: 1366×768 TN; 1366×768 IPS; 1920×1080 IPS; 1920×1080 IPS Touch (on-cell)	M(3/6/6); 23/48/72Wh m(3); 23Wh		
A275	2017	305.5 × 208.5 × 20.3; 12.03 × 8.21 × 0.80	1.27 kg (2.8 lb)	AMD Carrizo or Bristol Ridge		32 GB DDR4 — 1866 MHz (1 slot)	AMD Radeon R5 or R7 Graphics	One 2.5" SATA 7mm or One M.2 x2	Gigabit Ethernet; Wi-Fi + BT M.2 Card; Optional WWAN		style="background-color: var(--background-color-base, #fff); color:var(--color-base, #202122); vertical-align: middle; text-align: center; " class="table-no" | Anti-glare: 1366×768 TN; 1920×1080 IPS; 1920×1080 IPS Touch (on-cell)	M(3/6/6); 23/48/72Wh m(3); 23Wh		

=== 2018 ===
==== X280 ====
Lenovo ThinkPad X280 is the first in the X line to feature charging and docking to USB-C Thunderbolt.

Unlike previous models in the series, this has soldered RAM, a non-removable battery, and no built-in RJ45 Ethernet port (although one is available via an extension cable). Some users have contended that this eliminates several of the central appeals of the X2* series, and that it effectively represents a replication of Lenovo's existing lines rather than a true continuation of the series.

==== A285 ====
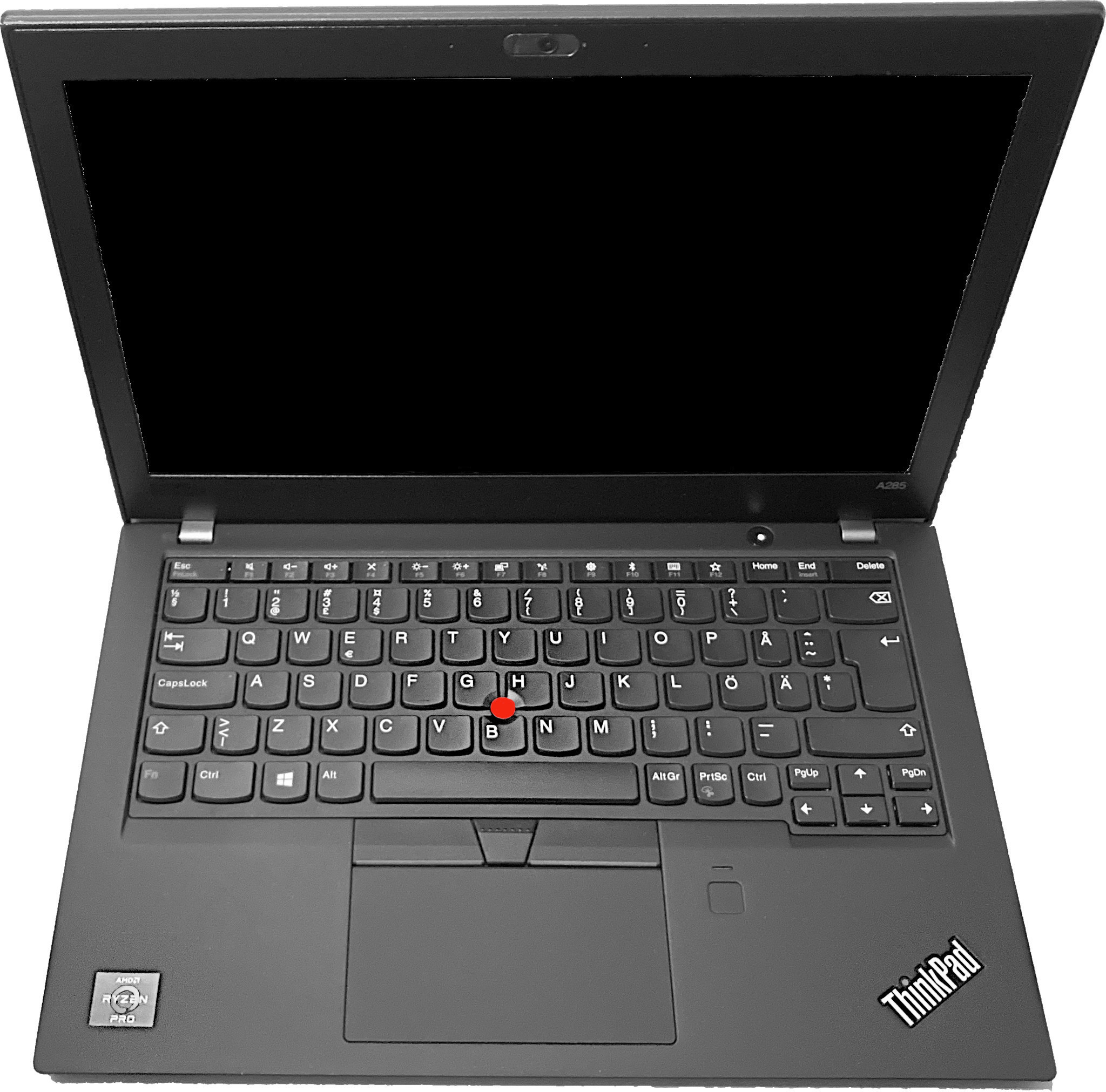
Lenovo Thinkpad A285 notebook

The A285 is a version of the X280 with an AMD processor. While the ports selection and connectivity look identical, A285 lacks X280's Thunderbolt 3 support.

==== X380 Yoga ====
Model	Release (US)	Dimensions (mm / in)	Weight ^{(min)}	CPU	Chipset	Memory ^{(max)}	Graphics	Storage	Networking	Audio	Screen	Battery	Other	Operating System
12.5"
X280	2018	307.7 × 209.8 × 17.4–17.8; 12.11 × 8.26 × 0.69–0.70	1.13 kg (2.5 lb)	7th or 8th Gen Intel Core		4/8/16 GB DDR4 — 2133 or 2400 (8th Gen) MHz (soldered)	Intel HD Graphics 620 (7th Gen) or Intel UHD Graphics 620 (8th Gen)	One M.2 x4	Mini Gigabit Ethernet; Wi-Fi + BT M.2 Card; Optional WWAN M.2 Card (?)		Anti-glare: 1366×768 TN; 1920×1080 IPS; 1920×1080 IPS Touch (on-cell)	m 48Wh	ThinkShutter; One TB3 x2 Soldered charging port	
A285	2018	307.7 × 209.8 × 17.4–17.8; 12.11 × 8.26 × 0.69–0.70	1.13 kg (2.5 lb)	1st Gen AMD Ryzen Mobile		8/16 GB DDR4 — 2400 MHz (soldered)	AMD Radeon Vega 6, 8 or 10	One M.2 x4	Mini Gigabit Ethernet; Wi-Fi + BT M.2 Card; Optional WWAN M.2 Card (?)		Anti-glare: 1366×768 TN; 1920×1080 IPS; 1920×1080 IPS Touch (on-cell)	m 48Wh	ThinkShutter	
13.3"
X380 Yoga	2018	313.5 × 222.2 × 18.2; 12.34 × 8.75 × 0.72	1.43 kg (3.2 lb)	7th or 8th Gen Intel Core		8/16 GB DDR4 — 2400 MHz (soldered)	Intel HD Graphics 620 (7th Gen) or Intel UHD Graphics 620 (8th Gen)	One M.2 x4	Mini Gigabit Ethernet; Wi-Fi + BT M.2 Card; Optional WWAN M.2 Card (?)		Anti-glare, anti-smudge: 1920×1080 IPS Touch	m 51Wh	One TB3 x2	

=== 2019 ===
==== X390 ====
Update of X280 with a same case but with a 13 in (33 cm) screen.

==== X395 ====
Same as the X390, but it has an AMD processor.

==== X390 Yoga ====
A smaller 13.3" derivative of the X1 Yoga

Model	Release (US)	Dimensions (mm / in)	Weight ^{(min)}	CPU	Chipset	Memory ^{(max)}	Graphics	Storage	Networking	Audio	Screen	Battery	Other	Operating System
13.3"
X390	2019	311.9 × 217.2 × 16.9; 12.28 × 8.55 × 0.67	1.22 kg (2.7 lb)	8th or 10th Gen Intel Core		4/8/16/32 GB DDR4 — 2400 MHz (soldered)	Intel UHD Graphics	One M.2 x4	Mini Gigabit Ethernet Intel Wireless-AC 9560 Wi-Fi or Wi-Fi 6 AX200 + BT 5.0 (soldered); Optional WWAN M.2 Card (?)		style="background-color: var(--background-color-base, #fff); color:var(--color-base, #202122); vertical-align: middle; text-align: center; " class="table-no" | Anti-glare: 1366×768 TN; 1920×1080 IPS; 1920×1080 IPS PrivacyGuard; 1920×1080 IPS Touch (on-cell)	m 48Wh	ThinkShutter; One TB3 x2 Soldered charging port	Windows 10 Pro
X395	2019	311.9 × 217.2 × 16.9; 12.28 × 8.55 × 0.67	1.28 kg (2.8 lb)	2nd Gen AMD Ryzen Mobile		8/16 GB DDR4 — 2400 MHz (soldered)	AMD Radeon Vega 6, 8, or 10	One M.2 x4	Mini Gigabit Ethernet; Wi-Fi + BT M.2 Card; Optional WWAN M.2 Card (?)		Anti-glare: 1366×768 TN; 1920×1080 IPS; 1920×1080 IPS PrivacyGuard; 1920×1080 IPS Touch (on-cell)	m 48Wh	ThinkShutter; Soldered charging port	Windows 10 Pro
X390 Yoga	2019	310.4 × 219 × 15.95; 12.22 × 8.62 × 0.63	1.29 kg (2.8 lb)	8th Gen Intel Core		8/16 GB DDR4 — 2400 MHz (soldered)	Intel UHD Graphics	One M.2 x4	Mini Gigabit Ethernet Intel Wireless-AC 9560 Wi-Fi or Wi-Fi 6 AX200 + BT 5.0 (soldered); Optional WWAN M.2 Card (?)		style="background-color: var(--background-color-base, #fff); color:var(--color-base, #202122); vertical-align: middle; text-align: center; " class="table-no" | Anti-glare, anti-smudge: 1920×1080 IPS Touch	m 50Wh	ThinkShutter; One TB3 x2	Windows 10 Pro

=== 2020 ===
==== X13 Yoga Gen 1 ====
- X13 Yoga (1st Gen)

Model	Release (US)	Dimensions (mm / in)	Weight ^{(min)}	CPU	Chipset	Memory ^{(max)}	Graphics	Storage	Networking	Audio	Screen	Battery	Other	Operating System
13.3"														
X13 Gen 1 (Intel)	Aug 2020	312 × 217.2 × 16.9; 12.28 × 8.55 × 0.67	1.22 kg (2.7 lb)	10th Gen Intel Core		8/16/32 GB DDR4 — 2666 MHz (soldered)	Intel UHD Graphics	One M.2 x4	Mini Gigabit Ethernet Intel Wi-Fi 6 AX201 + BT 5.0 (soldered); Optional WWAN M.2 Card (?)		Anti-glare: 1366 × 768 TN 1920 × 1080 IPS 1920 × 1080 IPS PrivacyGuard 1920 × 1080 IPS Touch (on-cell)	m 48Wh	ThinkShutter; One TB3 x?	Windows 10 Pro
X13 Gen 1 (AMD)	Aug 2020	312 × 217.2 × 16.9; 12.28 × 8.55 × 0.67	1.28 kg (2.8 lb)	4th Gen AMD Ryzen Mobile		8/16/32 GB DDR4 — 2666 MHz (soldered)	AMD Radeon 7 nm Vega 6 or 7	One M.2 x4	Mini Gigabit Ethernet; Wi-Fi + BT M.2 Card; Optional WWAN M.2 Card (?)		Anti-glare: 1366 × 768 TN 1920 × 1080 IPS 1920 × 1080 IPS PrivacyGuard 1920 × 1080 IPS Touch (on-cell)	m 48Wh	ThinkShutter	Windows 10 Pro
X13 Yoga Gen 1	Feb 2020	310.4 × 219 × 15.95; 12.22 × 8.62 × 0.63	1.25 kg (2.8 lb)	10th Gen Intel Core		8/16 GB DDR4 — 2666 MHz (soldered)	Intel UHD Graphics	One M.2 x4	Mini Gigabit Ethernet Intel Wi-Fi 6 AX201 + BT 5.0 (soldered); Optional WWAN M.2 Card (?)		Anti-glare, anti-smudge: 1920 × 1080 IPS Touch 1920 × 1080 IPS Touch PrivacyGuard 3840 × 2160 OLED Touch	m 50Wh	ThinkShutter; One TB3 x?	Windows 10 Pro

=== 2021 ===
The X13 gen 2 replaced the X13 predecessor with a magnesium/carbon case. The predecessor has a sturdy plastic case.

==== X12 Detachable Gen 1 ====
Released in 2021 at CES, the tablet is a new redesign that succeeds the Thinkpad X1 Tablet Gen 3. It has a 12.3 inch 3:2 FHD+ screen with a resolution of 1920x1280 pixels (187.61 ppi) at a peak brightness of 400 nits. The tablet came with the option of 11th Generation i3/i5/i7 processors with the option for Intel vPro. Storage was configurable up to a 1TB NVME SSD. The RAM was able to be configured up to 16GB. The tablet dimensions with the folio keyboard is 283.3 x 208.1 x 14.5 mm (11.15 x 8.19 x 0.57 inches) at a weight of 1,100 g (2.42 lbs). Lenovo claimed the device can last up to 10.36 Hours on a single charge. The tablet is capable of charging via USB-C up to 65w using the included charger.

The X12 model followed a similar format to the Microsoft Surface Pro line of detachable 2-in-1 laptops. The tablet also came with the pen and folio keyboard included with the laptop, unlike the Surface Pro series.

The Thinkpad X12 Detachable Gen 1 is designed to come apart for servicing. The WWAN card, (Note: Lenovo does not list SSDs as being compatible with this slot, however an NGFF M.2 SATA SSD does physically fit into the slot. There does not seem to be enough information at the time of writing (March 2025) to determine if such a modification is possible as with older models.) 2242 Single-Sided NVMe SSD, (Note: The listed maximum SSD capacity as 1TB, however 2TB or larger SSDs can be installed. Physical limitations only allow for single-sided SSDs to be installed into the slot due to the drive being mounted upside down as well as part of the backside of the drive being directly underneath part of the cooling system.) and Battery can be replaced. Similar to other X series machines, the RAM is soldered to the motherboard. Similarly, the Wifi and Bluetooth Module is soldered to the motherboard and cannot be replaced.

The tablet is criticized for the lack of ports. There are only two USB C ports on the machine, along with a headphone jack, Kensington lock slot, and internal micro SD/micro sim slot. All ports are located on the left side of the device, with the exception of the Kensington lock slot on the right side. The top USB C port is a full function Thunderbolt 4 port and the lower port is a full function USB 3.2 port. These ports can limit those who utilize devices that are not directly compatible with USB C, which would require a USB hub or related device to adapt the ports on the tablet to a different form factor. In addition, the inclusion of only two ports limits the device to being only connected to two devices at a time, a single port if the device is being charged. Limiting the use of the device further without using a USB hub or similar device.

Model	Release (US)	Dimensions (mm / in)	Weight ^{(min)}	CPU	Memory ^{(max)}	Graphics	Storage	Networking	Audio	Screen	Battery	Other	Operating System
12.3"
Thinkpad X12 Detachable Gen 1	Jan 2021	283.3 × 208.1 × 14.5; 11.15 × 8.19 × 0.57	1.1 kg (2.4 lb)	Intel 11th Gen i3-1110G4 i5-1130G7 i5-1140G7 i7-1160G7 i7-1180G7	4GB; LPDDR4x-3733 MHz (Single Channel); Soldered 8/16 GB; LPDDR4x-4266 MHz (Dual Channel); Soldered	Intel UHD Graphics (i3) Intel Iris Xe Graphics (i5-i7)	128GB; 256GB; 512GB; 1TB (Single NVME 2242 SSD)	No Onboard Ethernet Wifi 6 (AX201) + BT 5.1 (soldered) Optional WWAN Slot; Fibocom L850-GL, 4G LTE CAT9		Anti-Reflection/Anti Smudge: 1920x1280 IPS 400 nits Multi-Touch	m 42Wh	Optional NFC; Fingerprint Sensor One TB4 + One Type-C 10Gbps; Full Function	Windows 10 Pro

==== X13 Yoga Gen 2 ====
Model	Release (US)	Dimensions (mm / in)	Weight ^{(min)}	CPU	Chipset	Memory ^{(max)}	Graphics	Storage	Networking	Audio	Screen	Battery	Other	Operating System
13.3"
X13 Gen 2 (Intel)	Feb 2021	305.8 × 217.89 × 18.06; 12.04 × 8.58 × 0.71	1.21–1.38 kg (2.7–3.0 lb)	11th Gen Intel Core		8/16/32 GB LPDDR4 — 4266 MHz (soldered)	Intel UHD; Intel Iris Xe	One M.2 x4	Mini Gigabit Ethernet Intel Wi-Fi 6 AX200/AX201/AX210 + BT 5.1 (soldered); Optional WWAN M.2 Card (?)		Anti-glare: 1920 × 1200 IPS 1920 × 1200 IPS PrivacyGuard 1920 × 1200 IPS Touch (on-cell) 2560 × 1600 IPS Low power	m 41Wh; 54.7Wh	Two TB4	Windows 10 Pro
X13 Gen 2 (AMD)	Feb 2021	305.8 × 217.89 × 18.06; 12.04 × 8.58 × 0.71	1.21–1.38 kg (2.7–3.0 lb)	5th Gen AMD Ryzen Mobile		8/16/32 GB LPDDR4 — 4266 MHz (soldered)	AMD Radeon	One M.2 x4	Mini Gigabit Ethernet; Wi-Fi + BT 5.1; Optional WWAN M.2 Card (?)		Anti-glare: 1920 × 1200 IPS 1920 × 1200 IPS PrivacyGuard 1920 × 1200 IPS Touch (on-cell) 2560 × 1600 IPS Low power	m 41Wh; 54.7Wh	Two USB-C 3.2	Windows 10 Pro
X13 Yoga Gen 2	Feb 2021	305 × 213.9 × 15.39; 12.01 × 8.42 × 0.61	1.2 kg (2.6 lb)	11th Gen Intel Core		8/16/32 GB LPDDR4 — 4266 MHz (soldered)	Intel Iris Xe	One M.2 x4	No Ethernet Intel Wi-Fi 6 AX201 + BT 5.1 (soldered); Optional WWAN M.2 Card (?)		Anti-glare or anti-smudge: 1920 × 1200 IPS Touch 1920 × 1200 IPS Touch PrivacyGuard 2560 × 1600 IPS Touch	m 52.8Wh	Two TB4	Windows 10 Pro

=== 2022 ===
==== X13 Yoga Gen 3 ====
Model	Release (US)	Dimensions (mm / in)	Weight ^{(min)}	CPU	Chipset	Memory ^{(max)}	Graphics	Storage	Networking	Audio	Screen	Battery	Other	Operating System
13.3"
X13 Gen 3 (Intel)	Jun 2022	305.8 × 217.89 × 18.25; 12.04 × 8.58 × 0.72	1.20–1.32 kg (2.6–2.9 lb)	12th Gen Intel Core U or P series		8/16/32 GB LPDDR5 — 4800 MHz (soldered)	Intel UHD or Intel Iris Xe	One M.2 x4	No Onboard Ethernet Intel Wi-Fi 6 AX211 + BT 5.1 (soldered); Optional WWAN M.2 Card (?)		Anti-glare: 1920 × 1200 IPS 1920 × 1200 IPS PrivacyGuard 1920 × 1200 IPS Touch (on-cell) 2560 × 1600 IPS Low power	m 41Wh; 54.7Wh	Two TB4	Windows 11 Pro
X13 Gen 3 (AMD)	Jun 2022	305.8 × 217.89 × 18.25; 12.04 × 8.58 × 0.72	1.19–1.38 kg (2.6–3.0 lb)	5th Gen AMD Ryzen Mobile		8/16/32 GB LPDDR5 - 6400 MHz (soldered)	AMD Radeon 660M/680M	One M.2 x4	No Onboard Ethernet; AMD Wi-Fi 6E RZ616 + BT 5.1; Optional WWAN M.2 Card (?)		Anti-glare: 1920 × 1200 IPS 1920 × 1200 IPS PrivacyGuard 1920 × 1200 IPS Touch (on-cell) 2560 × 1600 IPS Low power	m 41Wh; 54.7Wh	One USB4; One USB-C 3.2	Windows 11 Pro
X13 Yoga Gen 3	Jun 2022	305 × 214.15 × 15.9; 12.01 × 8.43 × 0.63	1.19 kg (2.6 lb)	12th Gen Intel Core		8/16/32 GB LPDDR4 — 4266 MHz (soldered)	Intel Iris Xe	One M.2 x4	No Onboard Ethernet; Intel Wi-Fi 6 AX211 + BT 5.1 (soldered); Optional WWAN M.2 Card (?)		Anti-glare or anti-smudge: 1920 × 1200 IPS Touch 1920 × 1200 IPS Touch PrivacyGuard 2560 × 1600 IPS Touch	m 52.8Wh	Two TB4	Windows 11 Pro

=== 2023 ===
==== X13 Yoga Gen 4 ====
Model	Release (US)	Dimensions (mm / in)	Weight ^{(min)}	CPU	Chipset	Memory ^{(max)}	Graphics	Storage	Networking	Audio	Screen	Battery	Other	Operating System
13.3"
X13 Gen 4 (Intel)	May 2023	301.7 × 214.8 × 15.95; 11.88 × 8.46 × 0.63	1.09–1.25 kg (2.4–2.8 lb)	13th Gen Intel Core; U or P series		8/16/32 GB LPDDR5 — 4800 MHz (soldered)	Intel Iris Xe	One M.2 x4	No Onboard Ethernet Intel Wi-Fi 6 AX211 + BT 5.1 (soldered); Optional WWAN M.2 Card (?)		Anti-glare: 1920 × 1200 IPS 300 nits 1920 × 1200 IPS Low power 400 nits 1920 × 1200 IPS Touch 300 nits 2880 × 1800 OLED 400 nits	m 41Wh; 54.7Wh	Two TB4	Windows 11 Pro
X13 Gen 4 (AMD)	2023	301.7 × 214.8 × 15.95; 11.88 × 8.46 × 0.63	1.19–1.27 kg (2.6–2.8 lb)	6th Gen AMD Ryzen Mobile; Ryzen 5 Pro; Ryzen 7 Pro		16/32 GB LPDDR5x 6400 MHz (soldered)	AMD Radeon 740M / 780M	One M.2 x4	No Onboard Ethernet MT Wi-Fi 6E RZ616; QC Wi-Fi 6E NFA725A + BT 5.1(soldered) Optional WWAN M.2 Card		Anti-glare: 1920 × 1200 IPS 300 nits 1920 × 1200 IPS Low power 400 nits 1920 × 1200 IPS Touch 300 nits	m 41Wh; 54.7Wh	Two USB4	Windows 11 Pro
X13 Yoga Gen 4	May 2023	301.7 × 214.6 × 16.4; 11.88 × 8.45 × 0.65	1.21 kg (2.7 lb)	13th Gen Intel Core; U or P series		8/16/32 GB LPDDR5 — 4800 MHz (soldered)	Intel Iris Xe	One M.2 x4	No Onboard Ethernet; Intel Wi-Fi 6 AX211 + BT 5.1 (soldered); Optional WWAN M.2 Card (?)		Anti-reflection, anti-smudge: 1920 × 1200 IPS Touch; Anti-glare: 1920 × 1200 IPS Touch 1920 × 1200 IPS Touch Low power	m 41Wh; 54.7Wh	Two TB4	Windows 11 Pro

=== 2024 ===
==== X12 Detachable Gen 2 ====
Announced at CES 2024, The tablet was refreshed from the Thinkpad X12 Detachable Gen 1 with newer Intel Core Ultra CPUs, an option to be configured with up to 32 GB of RAM, and the addition of Wifi 6E. The form factor remains unchanged from the previous version, including the screen and battery. Both machines share the same maintenance instructions. Accessories that were built for the Gen 1 are compatible with the Gen 2, including aftermarket case, folio keyboard, pens and screen protectors.

The internals of the machine are largely identical to the first generation, so upgradeable WWAN card, Single-Sided 2242 SSD, and battery replacement is possible. The RAM and Wifi/Bluetooth card is soldered to the motherboard.

Due to the unchanged external design, critics panned the device for similar reasons to the Gen 1, Including the short battery life. In addition, the omission of a high refesh rate display, mediocre speakers, and performance that seems lacking. Making the device less appealing to those who are interested in a similar design to the Surface Pro.

Model	Release (US)	Dimensions (mm / in)	Weight ^{(min)}	CPU	Memory ^{(max)}	Graphics	Storage	Networking	Audio	Screen	Battery	Other	Operating System
12.3"
Thinkpad; X12; Detachable; Gen 2	November 2024	283.3 × 208.1 × 14.5; 11.15 × 8.19 × 0.57	1.1 kg (2.4 lb)	Intel Core Ultra; 5 134U; 7 164U NPU 11 TOPS	16 GB; 32 GB; LPDDR5x-7500 MHz; Soldered (6400Mhz due to platform limitations)	Intel Graphics	256GB; 512GB; 1TB (Single NVME 2242 SSD)	No Onboard Ethernet Wi-Fi 6E (AX211) + BT 5.3 (soldered) Optional WWAN Slot; Quectel EM160R-GL, 4G LTE CAT16	Realtek ALC3306-CG with stereo speakers by Dolby Audio and dual-microphone array with Dolby Voice	Anti-Reflection/Anti Smudge: 1920x1280 IPS 400 nits Multi-Touch	m 42Wh	Optional NFC; Fingerprint Sensor One TB4 + One Type-C 10Gbps; Full Function	Windows 11 Pro

==== X13 Gen 5 (Intel) ====
Model	Release (US)	Dimensions (mm / in)	Weight ^{(min)}	CPU	Memory ^{(max)}	Graphics	Storage	Networking	Audio	Screen	Battery	Other	Operating System
13.3"
Thinkpad X13; Gen 5	May 2024	301.7 × 214.8 × 15.95; 11.88 × 8.46 × 0.63	1.12–1.17 kg (2.5–2.6 lb)	Intel Core Ultra; 5 125H; 5 125U; 5 135U; 7 155H; 7 155U; 7 165U NPU 11 TOPS	16 GB; 32 GB; 64 GB; LPDDR5x-7500 MHz; Soldered (6400Mhz due to platform limitations)	Intel Graphics (U-Series) Intel Arc Graphics (H-Series)	256GB; 512GB; 1TB; 2TB (Single NVME 2280 SSD)	No Onboard Ethernet Wi-Fi 6E (AX211) + BT 5.3 (soldered) Wi-Fi 7 (BE200) + BT 5.4 (soldered) Optional WWAN Slot; Quectel EM061K-GL, 4G LTE CAT6; Fibocom FM350-GL, 5G Sub-6 GHz	Realtek ALC3287 & HD Audio with Stereo speakers, within Dolby Audio Premium and Dual-microphone array, 360° far-field with Dolby Voice	Anti-Glare: 1920x1200 IPS 300 nits No Touch Anti-Glare: 1920x1200 IPS 300 nits Multi-Touch Anti-Glare: 1920x1200 IPS 400 nits No Touch	m 41Wh; 54.7Wh	Optional NFC; Fingerprint Sensor Two TB4 + Two USB-A 5Gbps + One HDMI 2.1	Windows 11 Pro

==== X13 2-in-1 Gen 5 (Intel) ====
Model	Release (US)	Dimensions (mm / in)	Weight ^{(min)}	CPU	Memory ^{(max)}	Graphics	Storage	Networking	Audio	Screen	Battery	Other	Operating System
13.3"
Thinkpad X13; 2-in-1 Gen 5	May 2024	301.7 × 214.6 × 16.4; 11.88 × 8.45 × 0.65	1.22–1.26 kg (2.7–2.8 lb)	Intel Core Ultra; 5 125U; 5 135U; 7 155U; 7 165U NPU 11 TOPS	16 GB; 32 GB; 64 GB; LPDDR5x-7500 MHz; Soldered (6400Mhz due to platform limitations)	Intel Graphics	256GB; 512GB; 1TB; 2TB (Single NVME 2280 SSD)	No Onboard Ethernet Wi-Fi 6E (AX211) + BT 5.3 (soldered) Wi-Fi 7 (BE200) + BT 5.4 (soldered) Optional WWAN Slot; Quectel EM061K-GL, 4G LTE CAT6; Quectel EM160R-GL, 4G LTE CAT16	Realtek ALC3287 & HD Audio with Stereo speakers, within Dolby Audio Premium and Dual-microphone array, 360° far-field with Dolby Voice	Anti-Glare: 1920x1200 IPS 300 nits Multi-Touch Anti-Reflection/Anti Smudge: 1920x1200 IPS 300 nits Multi-Touch Anti-Glare: 1920x1200 IPS 400 nits Multi-Touch	m 41Wh; 54.7Wh	Optional NFC; Fingerprint Sensor Two TB4 + Two USB-A 5Gbps + One HDMI 2.1	Windows 11 Pro

=== 2025 ===
==== X9 14 Gen 1 (Intel) ====
Announced at CES, This laptop is a new category for Lenovo. Notable design differences include the removal of the red trackpoint, larger trackpad, Ai Features, and redesigned chassis.

Model	Release (US)	Dimensions (mm / in)	Weight ^{(min)}	CPU	Memory ^{(max)}	Graphics	Storage	Networking	Audio	Screen	Battery	Other	Operating System
13.3"
Thinkpad X9 14 Gen 1	March 2025	311.8 × 212.3 × 6.7–17.8; 12.28 × 8.36 × 0.26–0.70	1.21–1.27 kg (2.7–2.8 lb)	Intel Core Ultra; 5 226V; 5 228V; 5 238V; 7 258V; 7 268V NPU 48 TOPS	16 GB; 32 GB; LPDDR5x-8533 MHz; Soldered	Intel Arc Graphics 130V (Core Ultra 5) Intel Arc Graphics 140V (Core Ultra 7)	256GB; 512GB; 1TB; 2TB (Single NVME 2242 SSD)	No Onboard Ethernet No Optional WWAN Wi-Fi 7 (BE201) + BT 5.4 (soldered)	Cirrus Logic CS42L43 & HD Audio with stereo speakers within Dolby Atmos and dual-microphone array	Anti-Glare: 1920x1200 OLED 400 nits Non-Touch; 60Hz Anti-Reflection/Anti Smudge: 2880x1800 OLED 500 nits Multi-Touch; 30Hz-120Hz VRR	m 55Wh	Optional; Fingerprint Sensor No NFC No Trackpoint Two TB4 + One HDMI 2.1	Windows 11 Pro

==== X9 15 Gen 1(Intel) ====
Announced at CES, This laptop is a new category for Lenovo. Notable design differences include the removal of the red trackpoint, larger trackpad, Ai Features, and redesigned chassis.

Model	Release (US)	Dimensions (mm / in)	Weight ^{(min)}	CPU	Memory ^{(max)}	Graphics	Storage	Networking	Audio	Screen	Battery	Other	Operating System
13.3"
Thinkpad X9 15 Gen 1	March 2025	339.55 × 228.5 × 12.9; 13.37 × 9.00 × 0.51	1.4 kg (3.1 lb)	Intel Core Ultra; 5 226V; 5 228V; 5 238V; 7 258V; 7 268V NPU 48 TOPS	16 GB; 32 GB; LPDDR5x-8533 MHz; Soldered	Intel Arc Graphics 130V (Core Ultra 5) Intel Arc Graphics 140V (Core Ultra 7)	256GB; 512GB; 1TB; 2TB (Single NVME 2242 SSD)	No Onboard Ethernet; No Optional WWAN; Wi-Fi 7 (BE201) + BT 5.4 (soldered)	Cirrus Logic CS42L43 & HD Audio with stereo speakers within Dolby Atmos and dual-microphone array with smart noise-cancelling	Anti-Reflection/ Anti-Fingerprint: 2880x1800 OLED 500 nits Multi-Touch; 30Hz-120Hz VRR Anti-Reflection/ Anti-Fingerprint: 2880x1800 OLED 500 nits Non-Touch; 30Hz-120Hz VRR	m 80Wh	Optional; Fingerprint Sensor No NFC No Trackpoint Two TB4 + One USB-A 10Gbps + One HDMI 2.1	Windows 11 Pro; Windows 11 Home; Ubuntu Linux; Linux

== See also ==
- ThinkPad Yoga Series
- ThinkPad X1 Series
