= ThinkPad X1 series =

Series of laptops by Lenovo

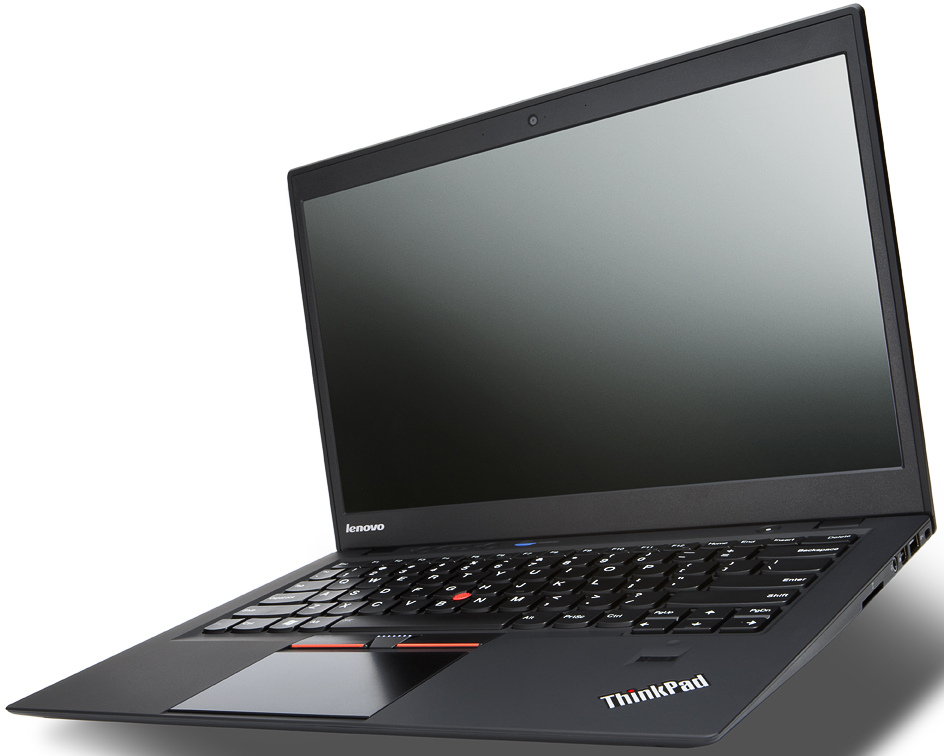
- ThinkPad X1 Carbon Gen 1 (2012)
- Developer: Lenovo
- Product family: ThinkPad
- Type: Ultrabook, flipbook, or tablet computer
- Released: June 2011; 15 years ago
- Lifespan: 2011–present
- CPU: Intel Core
- Graphics: Intel Graphics
- Related: ThinkPad X series

The ThinkPad X1 series is a line of high-end ThinkPad laptop and tablet computers produced by Lenovo. It is a sub-series of the ThinkPad X series designed to be extra premium with material that make them lighter and portable, having been originally classed as Ultrabooks. While the ThinkPad T series is the flagship ThinkPad line, the ThinkPad X1 series's X1 Carbon specifically has been cited as a flagship model since its introduction in 2012.

The current model list contains four product lines:

- X1 Carbon – mainstream premium 14-inch model
- X1 Yoga/2-in-1 – the convertible 14-inch version
- X1 Fold – the first foldable personal computer

Former product lines include:

- X1 Extreme – 15.6-inch (later 16-inch) advanced ultra-light premium laptop; the same model with a Quadro GPU known as ThinkPad P1
- X1 Titanium Yoga – a convertible 13.5-inch version with titanium body
- X1 Nano – a 13.3-inch version – the lightest ThinkPad model

== Launch ==
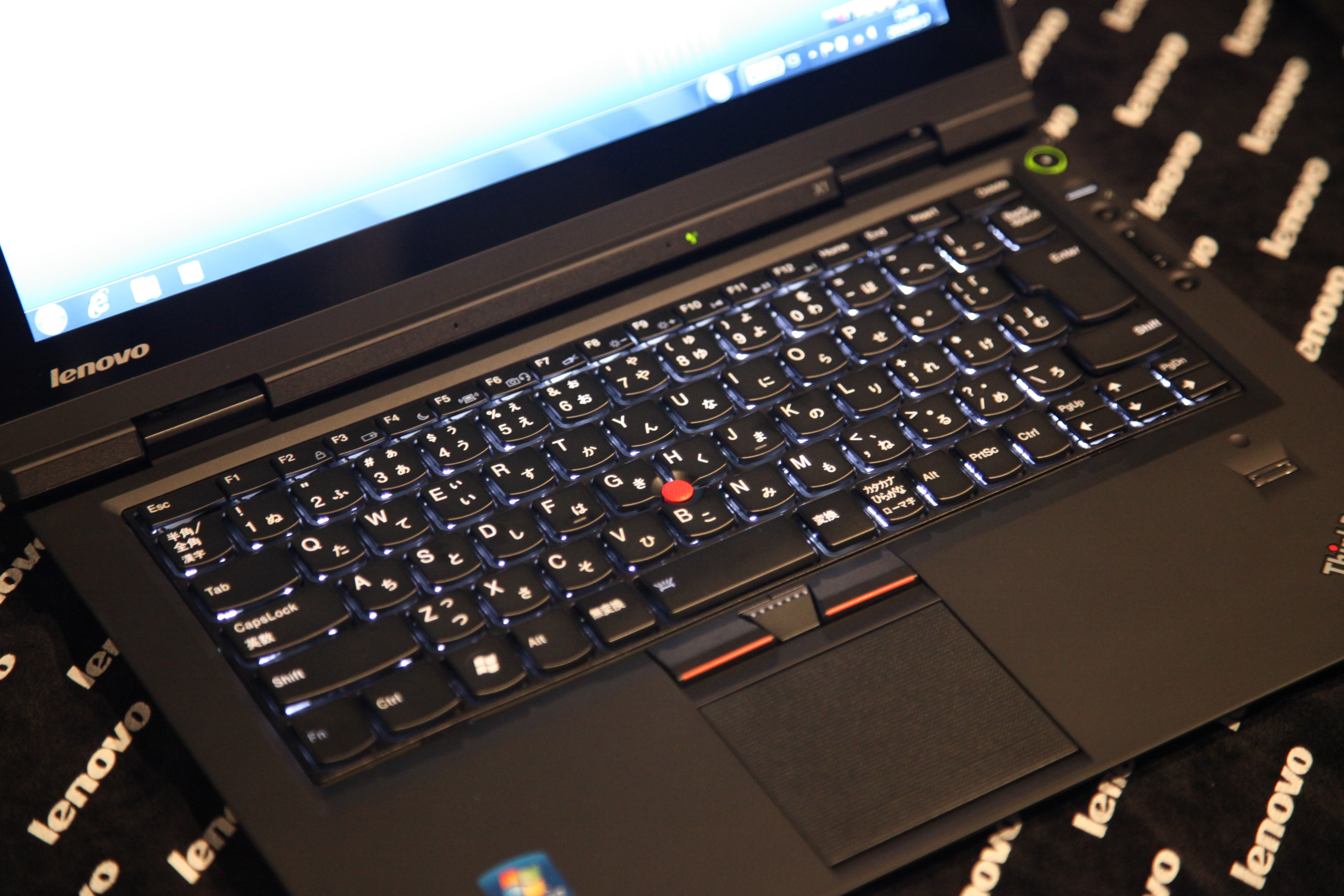
Early X1 model layout

The first laptop with X1 branding was the ThinkPad X1 – the 15-inch sub-compact model, the thinnest and fastest charging business laptop at the time of release in 2011. In contrast with previous 13-inch X series model (X301), it has only one RAM slot and only one storage slot.

In early August 2012, Lenovo released the ThinkPad X1 Carbon as the 14-inch successor to the original ThinkPad X1. The X1 Carbon was first released in China due to the popularity of ThinkPads in that market. In November 2012, Lenovo announced a touch-screen variant called the ThinkPad X1 Carbon Touch designed for use with Windows 8. Its display makes use of multi-touch technology that can detect simultaneous inputs from up to ten fingers. On the performance of the X1 Carbon Touch's SSD, Engadget states, "The machine boots into the [s]tart screen in 11 seconds, which is pretty typical for a Windows 8 machine with specs like these. We also found that the solid-state drive delivers equally strong read and write speeds (551 MB/s and 518 MB/s, respectively), which we noticed the last time we tested an Ultrabook with an Intel SSD. "

== Models ==
ThinkPad X1 series
Type	12.5"	13.3"			14"		15.6"	16"	
Type	Tablet	Tablet / Foldable	Premium ultrabook	Flipbook «2-in-1»		Premium ultrabook	Performance ultrabook		Foldable
2011			X1 original (Note: X1 type codes: 1286, 129#) (Note: Compatible with ThinkPad Basic USB 3.0 Dock) (Note: Compatible with ThinkPad USB 3.0 Pro Dock) (Note: Compatible with ThinkPad USB 3.0 Ultra Dock)						
2012			replaced by X1 Carbon			X1 Carbon; Gen 1 (Note: X1 Carbon type codes: Gen 1: 34##; Gen 2: 20A#; Gen 3: 20Bx; Gen 4: 20Fx; Gen 5: 20Hx (Kaby Lake) or 20K# (Skylake); Gen 6: 20Kx; Gen 7: 20Qx, 20R#; Gen 8: 20U9, 20UA; Gen 9: 20Xx)			
2013			replaced by X1 Carbon			X1 Carbon; Gen 1			
2014			replaced by X1 Carbon			X1 Carbon; Gen 2 (Note: Compatible with ThinkPad OneLink Dock)			
2015			replaced by X1 Carbon			X1 Carbon; Gen 3			
2016	X1 Tablet; Gen 1 (Note: Compatible with ThinkPad USB-C Dock) (Note: X1 Tablet type codes: Gen 1: 20Gx; Gen 2: 20Jx; Gen 3: 20Kx)		replaced by X1 Carbon		X1 Yoga; Gen 1 (Note: X1 Yoga type codes: Gen 1: 20Fx; Gen 2: 20Jx; Gen 3: 20Lx; Gen 4: 20Qx, 20Sx; Gen 5: 20Ux)	X1 Carbon; Gen 4			
2017	X1 Tablet; Gen 2		replaced by X1 Carbon		X1 Yoga; Gen 2	X1 Carbon; Gen 5 (Note: Compatible with ThinkPad Thunderbolt 3 Dock) (Note: Compatible with ThinkPad Hybrid USB-C with USB-A Dock) (Note: Compatible with ThinkPad Thunderbolt 3 Dock Gen 2) (Note: Compatible with ThinkPad Thunderbolt 3 Workstation Dock Gen 2)			
2018	replaced by 13" line	X1 Tablet; Gen 3	replaced by X1 Carbon		X1 Yoga; Gen 3	X1 Carbon; Gen 6	X1 Extreme; Gen 1 (Note: X1 Extreme type codes: Gen 1: 20Mx; Gen 2: 20Qx; Gen 3: 20Tx; Gen 4: 20Y#)		
2019	replaced by 13" line	replaced by X12 Detachable	replaced by X1 Carbon		X1 Yoga; Gen 4	X1 Carbon; Gen 7	X1 Extreme; Gen 2		
2020	replaced by 13" line	X1 Fold; Gen 1 (Note: X1 Fold type codes: Gen 1: 20Rx)	X1 Nano; Gen 1		X1 Yoga; Gen 5	X1 Carbon; Gen 8	X1 Extreme; Gen 3		
2021	replaced by 13" line	replaced by 16" line	X1 Nano; Gen 1	X1 Ti Yoga (Note: X1 Titanium Yoga type codes: Gen 1: 20Qx); Gen 1	X1 Yoga; Gen 6	X1 Carbon; Gen 9	replaced by 16" line	X1 Extreme; Gen 4	
2022	replaced by 13" line	replaced by 16" line	X1 Nano; Gen 2		X1 Yoga; Gen 7	X1 Carbon; Gen 10	replaced by 16" line	X1 Extreme; Gen 5	X1 Fold 16; Gen 1
2023	replaced by 13" line	replaced by 16" line	X1 Nano; Gen 3		X1 Yoga; Gen 8	X1 Carbon; Gen 11	replaced by 16" line	replaced by P1	X1 Fold 16; Gen 1
2024	replaced by 13" line	replaced by 16" line	replaced by X13 Gen 5		X1 2-in-1 Gen 9	X1 Carbon; Gen 12	replaced by 16" line	replaced by P1	X1 Fold 16; Gen 1
2025	replaced by 13" line	replaced by 16" line	replaced by X13 Gen 5		X1 2-in-1 Gen 10	X1 Carbon; Gen 13	replaced by 16" line	replaced by P1	
2026	replaced by 13" line	replaced by 16" line	replaced by X13 Gen 5		X1 2-in-1 Gen 11	X1 Carbon; Gen 14	replaced by 16" line	replaced by P1	
Notes

Battery configuration

Main	M(x)	Main hot-swappable (max.cells)	Secondary	U	Ultrabay removable
Main	M(x)	Main hot-swappable (max.cells)	Secondary	u	Ultrabay unremovable
Main	M(x)	Main removable (max.cells)	Secondary	m(x)	internal (max.cells) "PowerBridge"
Main	m(x)	Main internal (max.cells)	Secondary	S	Slice battery

Laptop color codes

Processor

Socketed desktop processor
Socketed mobile processor
Soldered high power processor
Soldered standard power processor
Soldered low power processor
Soldered ultra low power processor

Weight

0.9 kg (2.0 lb)	Up to 0.91 kg
1.0 kg (2.2 lb)	0.92–1.0 kg
1.1 kg (2.4 lb)	1.01–1.1 kg
1.2 kg (2.6 lb)	1.11–1.2 kg
1.3 kg (2.9 lb)	1.21–1.3 kg
1.4 kg (3.1 lb)	1.31–1.4 kg
1.5 kg (3.3 lb)	1.41–1.5 kg
1.6 kg (3.5 lb)	1.51–1.6 kg
1.7 kg (3.7 lb)	1.61–1.7 kg
1.8 kg (4.0 lb)	1.71–1.81 kg
1.9 kg (4.2 lb)	1.81–1.91 kg
2.0 kg (4.4 lb)	1.91–2.03 kg
2.1 kg (4.6 lb)	2.04–2.14 kg
2.3 kg (5.1 lb)	2.15–2.4 kg
2.5 kg (5.5 lb)	2.41–2.75 kg
2.8 kg (6.2 lb)	2.76–3.05 kg
3.1 kg (6.8 lb)	3.06–3.42 kg
3.5 kg (7.7 lb)	3.43–3.99 kg
4.0 kg (8.8 lb)	4.0–4.99 kg
5.5 kg (12 lb)	5.0–6.49 kg
7.2 kg (16 lb)	6.5–7.99 kg
9.1 kg (20 lb)	8.0–9.99 kg
10.7 kg (24 lb)	10–11.99 kg
12.7 kg (28 lb)	12–14.49 kg
14.5 kg (32 lb)	14.5–17.99 kg
18.1 kg (40 lb)	18–20.99 kg
21.7 kg (48 lb)	21–23.99 kg
24 kg (53 lb)	24–28.99 kg
29.5 kg (65 lb)	29 kg and above

Screen resolution

4K or higher
1440p+ (WQHD, QXGA)
1080p+ (Full HD, UXGA)
Better than 768p (SXGA,SXGA+)
600p+ (SVGA, HD, XGA, HD+)
Up to 600p (VGA)

Graphics

Dual standard socket graphics option
Dual proprietary socket graphics option
Standard socket graphics option
Proprietary socket graphics option
Soldered performance graphics option
Soldered midrange graphics option
Soldered mainstream graphics option
Soldered entry graphics option
Integrated entry graphics
Integrated basic graphics

Laptop storage combinations (excluding WWAN slot)

Level	PCIe 4.0 x4	PCIe 3.0 x4	PCIe 3.0 x2	M.2 SATA	mSATA	1.8" SATA	2.5" SATA	1.8" IDE	2.5" IDE
	2019; Not yet (laptops)	2013	2013	2013	2009	2003	2003	1991	1988
	3						2		
	4								
	3						1		
	2						2		
	3					2			
	3								
	2						1		
	4								
	3					1			
	2					2			
	2								
	1						1		
	3								
	2					1			
	1								
	2								
	1					1			
			2				1		
							4		
		1							
			1				1		
							3		
			1						
				1			1		
					1		1		
						1	1		
							2		
									3
						1			
							1		
									2
								1	
									1

Laptop memory

Amount	LPDDR5X	LPDDR5	DDR5	LPDDR4X	LPDDR4	DDR4	LPDDR3	DDR4	DDR3L		DDR3		DDR2		DDR	SDR	EDO	FPM
Amount						dual channel		< dual channel	dual channel	< dual channel	dual channel	< dual channel	dual channel	< dual channel				
Amount	2022 (laptops)	2019 (laptops)	2020	2017	2014	2014	2012	2014	2010		2007		2003		1998	1993	1993	1987
max memory = 512 GB	N/A	N/A	512 GB	N/A	N/A	N/A	N/A	N/A	N/A	N/A	N/A	N/A	N/A	N/A	N/A	N/A	N/A	N/A
max memory = 256 GB	N/A		256 GB (4 slots)	N/A	N/A	N/A	N/A	N/A	N/A	N/A	N/A	N/A	N/A	N/A	N/A	N/A	N/A	N/A
max memory = 128 GB	128 GB		128 GB	N/A	N/A	128 GB (4 slots)	N/A	N/A	N/A	N/A	N/A	N/A	N/A	N/A	N/A	N/A	N/A	N/A
64 GB ≤ max memory < 128 GB		64 GB		N/A	N/A	64 GB	N/A	64 GB (2 slots)	64 GB (4 slots)	N/A	N/A	N/A	N/A	N/A	N/A	N/A	N/A	N/A
32 GB ≤ max memory < 64 GB				32 GB	32 GB	32 GB	N/A		32 GB	32 GB (2 slots)	32 GB (4 slots)	N/A	N/A	N/A	N/A	N/A	N/A	N/A
16 GB ≤ max memory < 32 GB						16 GB	16 GB		16 GB		16 GB	16 GB (2 slots)	16 GB (4 slots)	N/A	N/A	N/A	N/A	N/A
8 GB ≤ max memory < 16 GB						8 GB			8 GB		8 GB		8 GB	8 GB (2 slots)	8 GB (4 slots)	N/A	N/A	N/A
4 GB ≤ max memory < 8 GB						4 GB			4 GB		4 GB		4 GB		4 GB	4 GB (4 slots)	4 GB (4 slots)	N/A
2 GB ≤ max memory < 4 GB						2 GB (8 chips)			2 GB		2 GB		2 GB			2 GB	2 GB	N/A
1 GB ≤ max memory < 2 GB			1 GB (1 chip)	dual channel min	dual channel min	N/A		single channel min	1 GB		1 GB		1 GB					1 GB (4 slots)
512 MB ≤ max memory < 1 GB	N/A	N/A	N/A	single channel min	single channel min	N/A	dual channel min	half channel min	512 MB (8 chips)		512 MB (8 chips)		512 MB					512 MB
256 MB ≤ max memory < 512 MB	N/A	N/A	N/A	256 MB (1 chip)	256 MB (1 chip)	N/A	single channel min	256 MB (1 chip)	N/A	single channel min	N/A	single channel min	256 MB					
128 MB ≤ max memory < 256 MB	N/A	N/A	N/A	N/A	N/A	N/A	128 MB (1 chip)	N/A	N/A	half channel min	N/A	half channel min						
64 MB ≤ max memory < 128 MB	N/A	N/A	N/A	N/A	N/A	N/A	N/A	N/A	N/A	64 MB (1 chip)	N/A	64 MB (1 chip)						
max memory < 64 MB	N/A	N/A	N/A	N/A	N/A	N/A	N/A	N/A	N/A	N/A	N/A	N/A						

=== 2011 ===
==== X1 (original) ====
An addition to the lightweight X series, weighing between 1.36 kg to 1.72 kg depending on configuration. It was the thinnest ThinkPad laptop to date at 16.5 (front) and 21.5 mm (rear). The screen is a 13.3-inch (340 mm) LED-backlit HD infinity panel with 1366 × 768 (WXGA) resolution. Base configuration uses an Intel Sandy Bridge 2.5 GHz Core i5-2520M (up to 3.20 GHz) with 4 GiB of RAM (up to 8 GiB), SATA SSD or hard drive, Intel Integrated HD Graphics, USB 3.0, backlit keyboard, 802.11 b/g/n WiFi and an average of eight hours of battery life. The battery is internal and not removable, and there is no optical drive.

The ThinkPad X1 laptop was released by Lenovo in May 2011. Notebook Review offered a positive opinion of the ThinkPad X1, saying that it was, "A powerful notebook that combines the durability and features of a business-class ThinkPad with the style of a consumer laptop." A 13.3-inch X1 ThinkPad was announced to be available in the UK on June 7, 2011.

The specifications of the ThinkPad X1 laptop are given below:

- Processor: Up to Intel Core i7-2640M (2× 2.80 GHz, 4 MB L3)
- Memory: Up to 8 GiB DDR3 1333 MT/s (1 slot)
- Graphics: Intel HD Graphics 3000
- Storage: 1 × SATA 6 Gbit/s (320 GB 7200 RPM HDD, or an SSD, ranging from 128 GiB to 160 GiB)
- Battery: Up to 5.2 hours. This could be extended further to 10 hours with a slice battery.

Model	Release (EU)	Dimensions	Weight ^{(min)}	CPU	Chipset	Memory ^{(max)}	Graphics	Storage	Networking	Audio	Screen	Battery	Other	Operating System
13.3"
X1	2011	340 × 230 × 17 – 21 mm	1.69 kg (3.7 lb)	2nd Gen Intel Core; Up to i7-2640M (2C/4T)	Intel; QM67	8 GiB DDR3 1333 MHz (1 slot)	Intel HD; 3000	One 2.5"; SATA 7 mm Drive	Gigabit Ethernet; Wi-Fi Half Mini PCIe Card; BT 3.0 Module; Optional WWAN	1366×768	m			

=== 2012 ===
==== X1 Carbon (1st Gen) ====
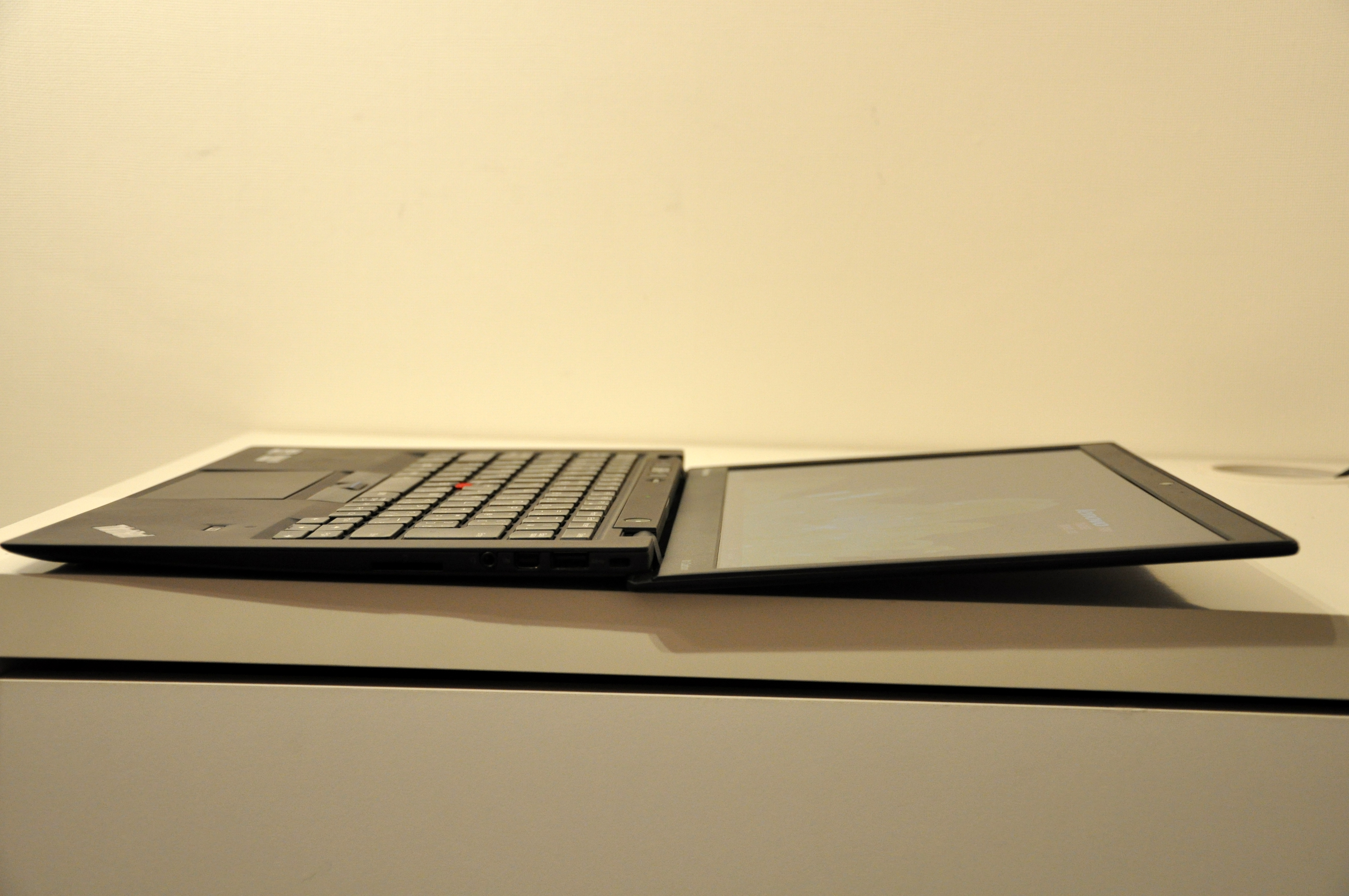
ThinkPad X1 Carbon in fully open position

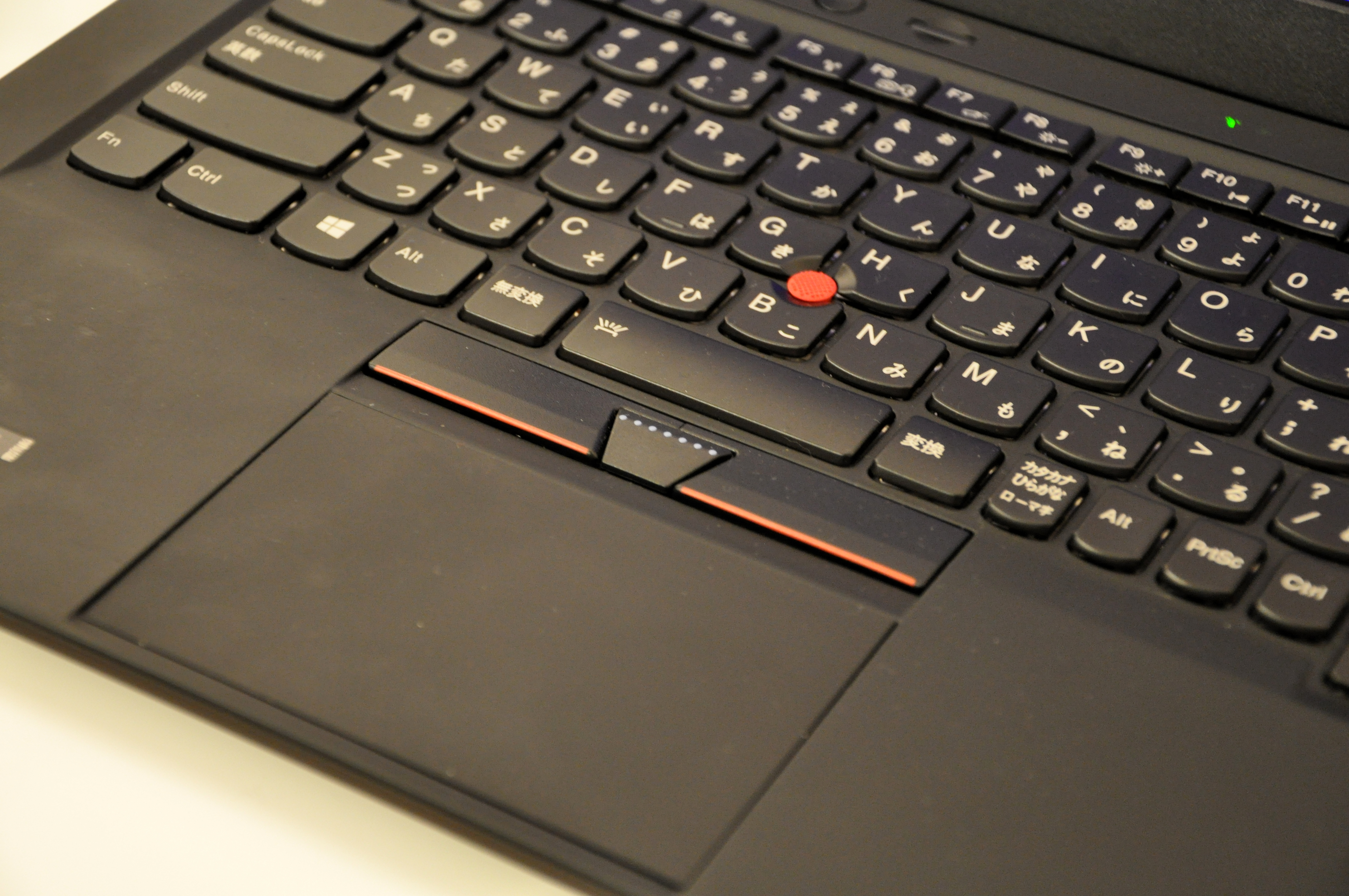
The ThinkPad X1 Carbon's Japanese keyboard, trackpoint, and touchpad

The X1 Carbon features a solid-state drive (SSD) instead of a hard drive. The base model has 4 GiB of memory, an Intel Core i5-3317U processor, and a 128 GiB SSD. The most expensive model has an Intel Core i7 processor and a 256 GiB SSD. The X1 Carbon requires the use of a dongle to access wired Ethernet and some models include 3G or 4G cellular modems.

The base model X1 Carbon has a 14-inch (360 mm) TN screen with a resolution of 1600 by 900 pixels. The X1 Carbon weighs 1.35 kilograms (3.0 lb) and measures 12.8 inches (330 mm) by 8.94 inches (227 mm) by 0.68 inches (17 mm) (at its thickest). The X1 Carbon's roll cage is made of light-weight carbon-fiber and has a matte black finish.

In November 2012, Lenovo announced a touch-screen variant called the ThinkPad X1 Carbon Touch designed for use with Windows 8. Its display makes use of multi-touch technology that can detect simultaneous inputs from up to ten fingers.

In a review published for CNET, Dan Ackerman wrote, "At first glance, the ThinkPad X1 Carbon looks a lot like other ThinkPads, but in the hand it stands out as very light and portable. The excellent keyboard shows up other ultrabooks, and the rugged build quality is reassuring. With a slightly boosted battery and maybe a lower starting price, this could be a serious contender for my all-around favorite thin laptop."

In another review for CNET, Nicholas Aaron Khoo wrote, "For this geek, there are many things to like about this 14-inch (1600x900 HD+) Ultrabook when it comes to usability when traveling on economy class. These include the backlit and spill-resistant keyboard, side-positioned ports, nice viewing angles, TrackPoint (which not everyone likes), nicely implemented touchpad and biometric login. Unlike it's [sic] poorer cousin, the Lenovo IdeaPad U410, it is able to go into hibernate mode without having the user jump through hoops to enable it."

On the X1 Carbon Touch's SSD performance Engadget states, "The machine boots into the [s]tart screen in 11 seconds, which is pretty typical for a Windows 8 machine with specs like these. We also found that the solid-state drive delivers equally strong read and write speeds (551 MB/s and 518 MB/s, respectively), which we noticed the last time we tested an Ultrabook with an Intel SSD."

==== 2012 Touch ====
In a review for Engadget, Dana Wollman wrote, "Starting with ergonomics, this has one of the best keyboard / touchpad combinations we've seen on a laptop, and that's not even counting that signature red pointing stick. We're also enamored with the design: aside from being well-made, the X1 Carbon Touch is also notably thin and light [at 1.55kg] for a 14-inch machine, especially one with a touchscreen. The display is hardly our favorite, what with the narrow viewing angles, but at least the 1,600 × 900 resolution is nice and crisp."

In its review of the X1 Carbon Touch, Wired wrote, "Lenovo also hasn't forgotten about the things that users actually care about. Audio is impressive and Dolby-certified. The keyboard is backlit and fully usable, and the glass touchpad was rock solid on this go-round with the Carbon." In its final verdict Wired stated that an "Excellent combination of performance, portability, and durability" and "the best keyboard going" make the Touch 'Wired."

Model	Release (US)	Dimensions	Weight ^{(min)}	CPU	Chipset	Memory ^{(max)}	Graphics	Storage	Networking	Audio	Screen	Battery	Other	Operating System
14"														
X1 Carbon (1st Gen) (3443, 3444, 3446, 3448, 3460, 3462, 3463)	2012	331 × 226 × 18.8 mm	1.36 kg (3.0 lb)	3rd Gen Intel Core: i5-3317U / i5-3337U / i5-3427U i7-3667U	Intel; QS77	4/8 GiB DDR3L 1333 MHz (soldered)	Intel; HD 4000	One SATA (proprietary 26-pin connector)	Mini Gigabit Ethernet; Wi-Fi + BT M.2 Card; Optional WWAN M.2 Card	HD Audio & Realtek ALC3202	Anti-glare: 1366 × 768 TFT	m	Soldered charging port	Windows 7 Professional
X1 Carbon (1st Gen) (3443, 3444, 3446, 3448, 3460, 3462, 3463)	2012	331 × 226 × 18.8 mm	1.36 kg (3.0 lb)	3rd Gen Intel Core: i5-3317U / i5-3337U / i5-3427U i7-3667U	Intel; QS77	4/8 GiB DDR3L 1333 MHz (soldered)	Intel; HD 4000	One SATA (proprietary 26-pin connector)	Mini Gigabit Ethernet; Wi-Fi + BT M.2 Card; Optional WWAN M.2 Card	HD Audio & Realtek ALC3202	Anti-glare: 1600 × 900 TFT	m	Soldered charging port	
X1 Carbon (1st Gen) (3443, 3444, 3446, 3448, 3460, 3462, 3463)	2012	331 × 226 × 20.8 mm	1.54 kg (3.4 lb)	3rd Gen Intel Core: i5-3317U / i5-3337U / i5-3427U i7-3667U	Intel; QS77	4/8 GiB DDR3L 1333 MHz (soldered)	Intel; HD 4000	One SATA (proprietary 26-pin connector)	Mini Gigabit Ethernet; Wi-Fi + BT M.2 Card; Optional WWAN M.2 Card	HD Audio & Realtek ALC3202	Anti-glare: 1600 × 900 TFT Touch	m	Soldered charging port	

=== 2014 ===
==== X1 Carbon (2nd Gen) ====
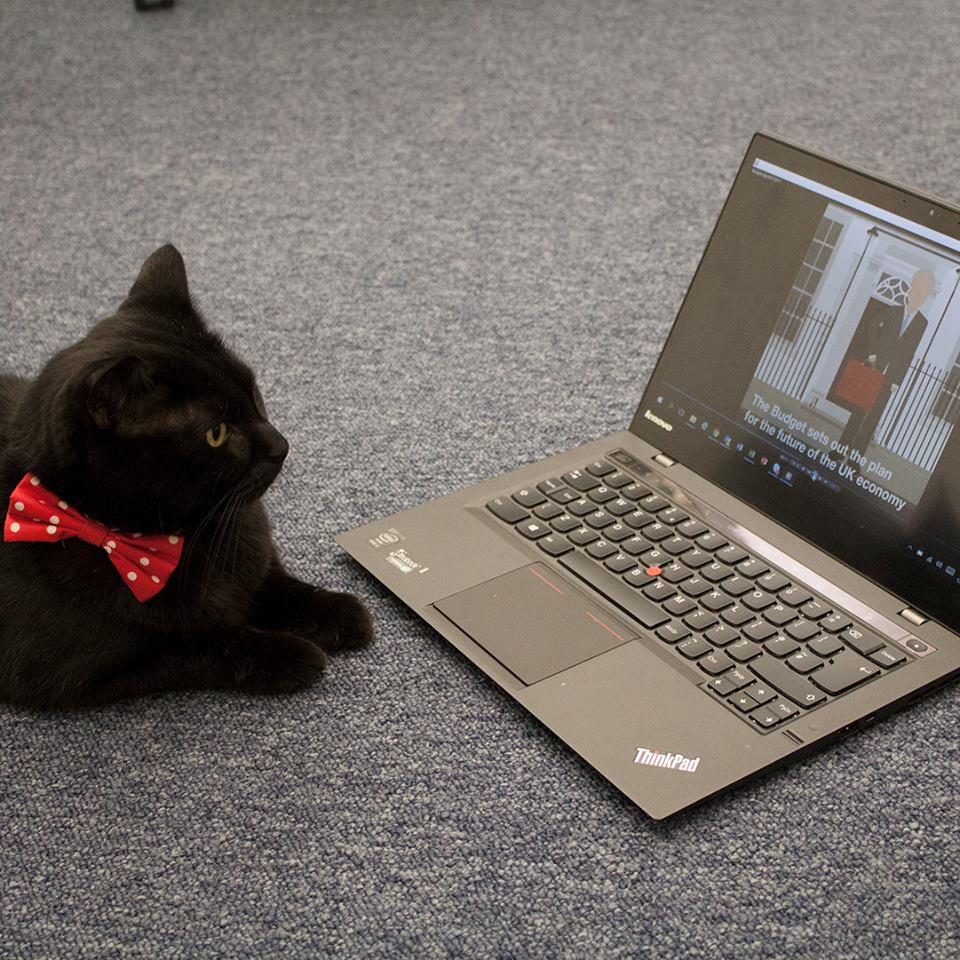
2nd Gen X1 Carbon (right)

The 2014 X1 Carbon features a 4th generation Intel processor and an "Adaptive Keyboard" touch bar where the function keys are normally located. The Home and End keys replaced the Caps Lock key, requiring the user to double-press the Shift key to activate Caps Lock. The Delete key was also repositioned to the right of the Backspace key instead of above it.

Peter Bright wrote a disparaging review for Ars Technica. He found the X1 Carbon with the Lenovo named "Adaptive Keyboard" to be near perfect but unusable because the keyboard was so non-standard when compared with that of a desktop, the older ThinkPad T410s and Lenovo Helix keyboards. As a touch typist, he despairs at the removal of the function keys, and the repositioning of Caps Lock, replacing it with Home End, and, that pretty much each little-finger key has moved.

Model	Release (US)	Dimensions	Weight ^{(min)}	CPU	Chipset	Memory ^{(max)}	Graphics	Storage	Networking	Audio	Screen	Battery	Other	Operating System
14"
X1 Carbon (2nd Gen) (20A7, 20A8)	2014	331 × 226.8 × 18.16 mm	1.34 kg (3.0 lb)	4th Gen Intel Core: i5-4200U / i5-4210U / i5-4300U i7-4600U		4/8 GiB DDR3L 1600 MHz (soldered)	Intel HD Graphics 4400	One M.2 SATA	Mini Gigabit Ethernet; Wi-Fi + BT M.2 Card; Optional WWAN M.2 Card	HD Audio & Realtek ALC3232 and Dolby Home Theater v4 with Digital Dual Array microphone certified for Microsoft Lync	Anti-glare: 1600 × 900	m	Soldered charging port	
X1 Carbon (2nd Gen) (20A7, 20A8)	2014	331 × 226.5 × 17.72 mm	1.28 kg (2.8 lb)	4th Gen Intel Core: i5-4200U / i5-4210U / i5-4300U i7-4600U		4/8 GiB DDR3L 1600 MHz (soldered)	Intel HD Graphics 4400	One M.2 SATA	Mini Gigabit Ethernet; Wi-Fi + BT M.2 Card; Optional WWAN M.2 Card	HD Audio & Realtek ALC3232 and Dolby Home Theater v4 with Digital Dual Array microphone certified for Microsoft Lync	Anti-glare: 2560 × 1440 IPS	m	Soldered charging port	
X1 Carbon (2nd Gen) (20A7, 20A8)	2014	331 × 227.1 × 18.46 mm	1.43 kg (3.2 lb)	4th Gen Intel Core: i5-4200U / i5-4210U / i5-4300U i7-4600U		4/8 GiB DDR3L 1600 MHz (soldered)	Intel HD Graphics 4400	One M.2 SATA	Mini Gigabit Ethernet; Wi-Fi + BT M.2 Card; Optional WWAN M.2 Card	HD Audio & Realtek ALC3232 and Dolby Home Theater v4 with Digital Dual Array microphone certified for Microsoft Lync	Anti-glare: 2560 × 1440 IPS Touch	m	Soldered charging port	

=== 2015 ===
==== X1 Carbon (3rd Gen) ====
The 2015 X1 Carbon features a 5th generation Intel Core processor. Lenovo reverted to the traditional Function row from the innovative but confusing Adaptive Function Row, and resumed using dedicated mouse buttons under the TrackPoint. A fingerprint reader is to the right of the keyboard and can be used to log into Windows.

In a review for Laptop Magazine, Mark Spoonauer wrote, "The ThinkPad X1 Carbon is easily one of the best business ultraportables available. While on the pricey side, the $1,754 configuration I reviewed delivers everything I want in a laptop: long battery life, a comfortable typing experience and strong overall performance. The X1 Carbon's design doesn't wow, but it's light and feels like it can stand up to abuse. However, the lack of an SD card slot is annoying, and I wish the 14-inch display were as bright as it is sharp

Model	Release (US)	Dimensions	Weight ^{(min)}	CPU	Chipset	Memory ^{(max)}	Graphics	Storage	Networking	Audio	Screen	Battery	Other	Operating System
14"
X1 Carbon (3rd Gen) (20BS, 20BT)	January 2015	331 × 226.8 × 18.16 mm	1.359 kg (3.00 lb)	5th Gen Intel Core: i5-5200U / i5-5300U i7-5500U / i7-5600U		4/8/16 GiB DDR3L 1600 MHz (soldered)	Intel HD 5500	One M.2 PCIe x4 or SATA	Mini Gigabit Ethernet; Wi-Fi + BT M.2 Card; Optional WWAN M.2 Card	HD Audio & Realtek ALC3232 and Dolby Home Theater v4 with Digital Dual Array microphone certified for Microsoft Lync	Anti-glare: 1920 × 1080	m	Soldered charging port	
X1 Carbon (3rd Gen) (20BS, 20BT)	January 2015	331 × 226.5 × 17.72 mm	1.305 kg (2.88 lb)	5th Gen Intel Core: i5-5200U / i5-5300U i7-5500U / i7-5600U		4/8/16 GiB DDR3L 1600 MHz (soldered)	Intel HD 5500	One M.2 PCIe x4 or SATA	Mini Gigabit Ethernet; Wi-Fi + BT M.2 Card; Optional WWAN M.2 Card	HD Audio & Realtek ALC3232 and Dolby Home Theater v4 with Digital Dual Array microphone certified for Microsoft Lync	Anti-glare: 2560 × 1440 IPS	m	Soldered charging port	
X1 Carbon (3rd Gen) (20BS, 20BT)	January 2015	331 × 227.1 × 18.46 mm	1.44 kg (3.2 lb)	5th Gen Intel Core: i5-5200U / i5-5300U i7-5500U / i7-5600U		4/8/16 GiB DDR3L 1600 MHz (soldered)	Intel HD 5500	One M.2 PCIe x4 or SATA	Mini Gigabit Ethernet; Wi-Fi + BT M.2 Card; Optional WWAN M.2 Card	HD Audio & Realtek ALC3232 and Dolby Home Theater v4 with Digital Dual Array microphone certified for Microsoft Lync	Anti-glare: 2560 × 1440 IPS Touch	m	Soldered charging port	

=== 2016 ===
==== X1 Carbon (4th Gen) ====
In January 2016 at the Consumer Electronics Show (CES), Lenovo presented their fourth generation X1 Carbon.

==== X1 Yoga ====
The first generation of the X1 Yoga was released in 2016, featuring a 14 in (36 cm) touchscreen with a 360-degree hinge. Unlike many other laptops in the X1 series, it features a stylus and a dedicated slot for it. Like many others in the X1 series, the X1 Yoga features a built-in fingerprint sensor, multiple USB ports, an HDMI port, and support for up to Intel i7 processors.

Model	Release (US)	Dimensions	Weight ^{(min)}	CPU	Chipset	Memory ^{(max)}	Graphics	Storage	Networking	Audio	Screen	Battery	Other	Operating System
14"
X1 Carbon (4th Gen)	2016		1.17 kg (2.6 lb)	6th Gen Intel Core		4/8/16 GiB LPDDR3 1866 MHz (soldered)	Intel HD 520	One M.2 x4	OneLink+ Gigabit Ethernet; Wi-Fi + BT M.2 Card; Optional WWAN M.2 Card (?)		Anti-glare: 1920 × 1080 IPS; 2560 × 1440 IPS	m	Soldered charging port + 3x USB 3.0 Type A ports + HDMI + Mini-Displayport + MicroSD Card Reader; OneLink	
X1 Yoga	2016		1.36 kg (3.0 lb)	6th Gen Intel Core		8/16 GiB LPDDR3 — 1866 MHz (soldered)	Intel HD 520	One M.2 x4	OneLink+ Gigabit Ethernet; Wi-Fi + BT M.2 Card; Optional WWAN M.2 Card (?)		Glare: 2560×1440 OLED Touch Anti-glare: 1920×1080 IPS Touch; 2560×1440 IPS Touch	m		

==== X1 Tablet (1st Gen) ====
The X1 Tablet was Lenovo's first attempt at integrating a 2-in-1 Surface-like device into the X series. Following in the footsteps of the Thinkpad Helix, this new device was meant to appeal to those who want a thin and light laptop on the go. Featuring a 12" 3:2 FHD+ display with a resolution of 2160x1440 pixels (216.33 PPI) at a peak brightness of 360 nits. The tablet came with the option to configure the processor with the 6th gen core M series, an ultra low power version of the existing Core i Series. Storage could be configured up to 1TB on an NVME SSD. RAM was configurable up to 16GB. The tablet itself without the keyboard is 291.5 mm × 209.5 mm × 8.75 mm (11.48" × 8.25" × 0.34"). The tablet weighs 767 grams (1.69 Ibs) by itself, but could weigh as much as 1,310 grams (2.89 Ibs) with the addition of the keyboard and the productivity module. Lenovo claims ~10 hours of battery life.

The computer came with a pen and the type cover in the box. When this tablet was released, there were external modules that could be attached using the bottom of the device. By default, there was a blanking plate that covers the module connectors. Once removed, you can connect docking accessories to the device. There were three models from Lenovo that could be connected.

The first was a productivity module that added an extra USB 3.0 Type A port, HDMI port, and a 24Wh battery that could extend your battery life by about ~5 hours according to Lenovo.

The second module was a projector module that contained a pico projector, HDMI, and a 10Wh battery for the module itself.

The third module that was released was a 3D camera attachment. However, this was more built for specialized 3D mapping tasks.

Model	Release (US)	Dimensions (mm / in)	Weight ^{(min)}	CPU	Chipset	Memory ^{(max)}	Graphics	Storage	Networking	Audio	Screen	Battery	Other	Operating System
12"
X1 Tablet 1st Gen	2016	291.5 × 209.5 × 8.75; 11.48 × 8.25 × 0.34	0.767–1.31 kg (1.69–2.89 lb)	6th Gen Intel Core M m3-6Y30 m5-6Y54 m5-6Y57 m7-6Y75		4/8/16 GB LPDDR3; 1866 MHz (Soldered); Dual Channel	Intel HD Graphics 515	One M.2 SATA (128GB) or One M.2 NVME (256GB/512GB/1TB)	(No onboard Ethernet) Wi-Fi 5 (AC 8260) + BT 4.2; M.2 slot Optional WWAN slot Sierra Wireless EM7455 Qualcomm 4G-LTE	Realtek ALC3268 with stereo speakers, three microphones and combo audio/microphone jack	style="background-color: var(--background-color-base, #fff); color:var(--color-base, #202122); vertical-align: middle; text-align: center; " class="table-no" | Anti-Glare/Anti-Fingerprint: 2160x1440 IPS; 360 nits Multi-Touch	m(1); 37Wh	OneLink+ One USB-A 3.0 + One USB-C Full Function + One Mini-Displayport + One MicroSD Card Reader	Windows 10 Home; Windows 10 Pro

=== 2017 ===
==== X1 Carbon (5th Gen) ====
In January 2017 at the Consumer Electronics Show (CES), Lenovo presented their fifth generation X1 Carbon, 1.14 kg weight, which delivers up to 15.5 hours of battery life starting at $1,329. A silver version was also introduced.

This is the first generation of X1 Carbon to include USB-C ports.

===== Recall =====
The ThinkPad X1 Carbon 5th Generation laptops built before 2017-11-01 were recalled after reports that a screw left in the laptop during manufacturing could damage one of the lithium batteries causing one of the cells to short out, leading to rapid overheating and failure. 83,500 of the laptops had been sold in the US and Canada before the recall.

==== X1 Yoga (2nd Gen) ====
Changes from previous X1 Yoga includes the use of 7th generation Intel Core i ('Kaby Lake') processors, addition of Thunderbolt 3 ports, USB-C connector for power adapter, 'wave' style keyboard featuring matte finish on the keyboard.

==== X1 Tablet (2nd Gen) ====
The X1 Tablet 2nd Gen was a refresh of the first Gen. With newer 7th gen core i/m series processors, updated integrated graphics and refreshed internal Wifi/Bluetooth module. Externally, the device fits dimensionally with accessories made for the first gen, including Onelink+ modules, keyboards, screen protectors, and cases.

Model	Release (US)	Dimensions	Weight ^{(min)}	CPU	Chipset	Memory ^{(max)}	Graphics	Storage	Networking	Audio	Screen	Battery	Other	Operating System
12"
X1 Tablet 2nd Gen	2017	291.5 × 209.5 × 8.75; 11.48 × 8.25 × 0.34	0.767–1.31 kg (1.69–2.89 lb)	7th Gen Intel Core M/i Series m3-7Y30 i5-7Y54 i5-7Y57 i7-7Y75		4/8/16 GB LPDDR3; 1866 MHz (Soldered); Dual Channel	Intel HD Graphics 615	One M.2 SATA (128GB); One M.2 NVME (256GB/512GB/1TB)	(No onboard Ethernet) Wi-Fi 5 (AC 8265) + BT 4.2; M.2 slot Optional WWAN slot Qualcomm SnapdragonX7 LTE-A 4G-LTE (Sierra Wireless EM7455)	Realtek ALC3268 with stereo speakers, three microphones and combo audio/microphone jack	style="background-color: var(--background-color-base, #fff); color:var(--color-base, #202122); vertical-align: middle; text-align: center; " class="table-no" | Anti-Glare/Anti-Fingerprint: 2160x1440 IPS; 360 nits Multi-Touch	m(1); 37Wh	OneLink+ Optional Fingerprint Reader One USB-A 3.0 + One USB-C Full Function + One Mini-Displayport + One MicroSD Card Reader	Windows 10 Home; Windows 10 Pro
14"
X1 Carbon (5th Gen)	2017		1.13 kg (2.5 lb)	6th or 7th Gen Intel Core		8/16 GiB LPDDR3 1866 MHz (soldered)	Intel HD 520 (6th Gen CPUs); Intel HD 620 (7th Gen CPUs)	One M.2 x4	Mini Gigabit Ethernet; Wi-Fi + BT M.2 Card; Optional WWAN		Anti-glare: 1920 × 1080 IPS; 2560 × 1440 IPS	m	Two TB3 x4	Windows 10 Pro
X1 Yoga (2nd Gen)	2017		1.36 kg (3.0 lb)	7th Gen Intel Core		8/16 GiB LPDDR3 — 1866 MHz (soldered)	Intel HD 620	One M.2 x4	Mini Gigabit Ethernet; Wi-Fi + BT M.2 Card; Optional WWAN		Glare, anti-smudge: 1920×1080 IPS Touch; 2560×1440 IPS Touch; 2560×1440 OLED Touch	m	Two TB3 x4 Soldered charging port	Windows 10 Pro

=== 2018 ===
==== X1 Carbon (6th Gen) ====
In January 2018 at the Consumer Electronics Show (CES), Lenovo presented their sixth generation X1 Carbon, weighing 1.13 kg (2.5 lb). This is the first X1 Carbon model to have a quad-core processor. It features an 8th generation Intel Core i5 or i7 processor, along with up to 16 GiB of RAM and up to 1 TiB of storage. X1 branding is also now present on the cover. The ThinkPad logo has changed to black instead of the previous silver branding.

==== X1 Yoga (3rd Gen) ====
The design is derived from 6th generation ThinkPad X1 Carbon, with the ThinkShutter privacy camera included by default (except for models with an IR camera), 15W 8th generation Core i5/i7 quad core processors and a built-in stylus. OLED screens are no longer an option.

==== X1 Tablet (3rd Gen) ====
The X1 Tablet 3rd gen went through a major redesign from the first two generations. The design changes include no compatibilty with OneLink+ modules, a larger screen, consolidation of ports, a tented rear kickstand, and a design more centered around Surface Devices at the time. This design served as the basis for the successor in the x12 Detachable Series.

The Screen was changed to a larger 13 inch 3.2 IPS Multi-Touch display with a resolution of 3000x2000 pixels (277.35 PPI) rated at 400 nits. The processors were upgraded to the 8th generation Intel Core i series, unlike previous generation which used the ultra low powered core M series CPUs. The RAM was configurable up to 16GB of soldered memory. The Storage could be configured up to a 1TB NVMe SSD. The device, with folio keyboard is 304.1 mm × 226 mm × 14.4 mm (11.97" × 8.9" × 0.57"). The Device, with folio keyboard, weighs 1.27 kg (2.8 lb). Lenovo claims a battery life of 9.5hrs on a single charge.

==== X1 Extreme (1st Gen) ====
The first 15.6-inch ThinkPad X-series laptop. Also, in contrast to the regular 14-inch ThinkPad X series models, the X1 Extreme has user-upgradable RAM and the full-power HQ-series mobile Intel CPUs.

X1 Extreme laptop have a sibling model in a ThinkPad P series line, known as a ThinkPad P1.

Model	Release (US)	Dimensions	Weight ^{(min)}	CPU	Chipset	Memory ^{(max)}	Graphics	Storage	Networking	Audio	Screen	Battery	Other	Operating System
13.3"
X1 Tablet 3rd Gen	2018	304.1 × 226 × 14.4; 11.97 × 8.90 × 0.57	0.89–1.27 kg (2.0–2.8 lb)	8th Gen Intel Core Series i5-8250u i5-8350u i7-8550u i7-8650u		8/16 GB LPDDR3; 2133 MHz (Soldered); Dual Channel	Intel UHD Graphics 620	One M.2 SATA (128GB/256GB); One M.2 NVME (256GB/512GB/1TB)	(No onboard Ethernet) Wi-Fi 5 (AC 8265) + BT 4.2; M.2 slot Optional WWAN slot Sierra Wireless EM7430 4G LTE-A; Sierra Wireless EM7455 4G LTE-A	Stereo speakers and dual-microphone array	style="background-color: var(--background-color-base, #fff); color:var(--color-base, #202122); vertical-align: middle; text-align: center; " class="table-no" | Anti-reflection/Anti-Smudge: 3000x2000 IPS; 400 nits Multi-Touch	m(1); 42Wh	ThinkShutter; Optional Fingerprint Reader NFC; Two TB3	Windows 10 Home; Windows 10 Home Single Language; Windows 10 IoT Enterprise; Windows 10 Pro
14"
X1 Yoga 3rd Gen	2018	333 × 229 × 17.05; 13.11 × 9.02 × 0.67	1.4 kg (3.1 lb)	7th/8th Gen Intel Core Series i5-7300u i5-8250u i5-8350u i7-8550u i7-8650u		8/16 GB LPDDR3; 1866 MHz (7th Gen) 8/16 GB LPDDR3; 2133 MHz(8th Gen) (Soldered); Dual Channel	Intel HD Graphics 620 or Intel UHD Graphics 620	One M.2 SATA (128GB/256GB); One M.2 NVME (256GB/512GB/1TB)	Intel I219-LM (Ethernet Extension Connector) Wi-Fi 5 (AC 8265) + BT 4.2 Wi-Fi 5 (AC 9260) + BT 5.0 M.2 slot Optional WWAN slot (Intel XMM 7360); Fibocom L850-GL	HD Audio, Realtek ALC3286 with stereo speakers powered by Dolby Audio Premium, 360° noise-cancelling Dual Array Far Field and headphone / microphone combo jack	style="background-color: var(--background-color-base, #fff); color:var(--color-base, #202122); vertical-align: middle; text-align: center; " class="table-no" | Anti-reflection: 1920x1280 WVA; 300 nits Non-Touch Anti-reflection: 2560x1440 WVA; 300 nits Non-Touch Anti-reflection/Anti-Smudge: 2560x1440 WVA; 500 nits Multi-Touch	m(1); 54Wh	ThinkShutter; Optional Fingerprint Reader; NFC; Two TB3; Two USB A 5Gbps; One HDMI 1.4; MicroSD card reader	Windows 10 Pro
15.6"
X1 Extreme (1st Gen)	2018		1.7 kg (3.7 lb)	8th Gen Intel Core	Intel CM246	64 GiB DDR4 — 2666 MHz (2 slots)	Intel UHD 630 Optional + NVIDIA GTX 1050 Ti Max-Q 4 GB	Two M.2 x4	Mini Gigabit Ethernet; Wi-Fi + BT M.2 Card		Anti-glare: 1920 × 1080 IPS; 3840 × 2160 IPS; 3840 × 2160 IPS Touch	m	ThinkShutter; Two TB3 x4	Windows 10 Pro

=== 2019 ===
==== X1 Carbon (7th Gen) ====
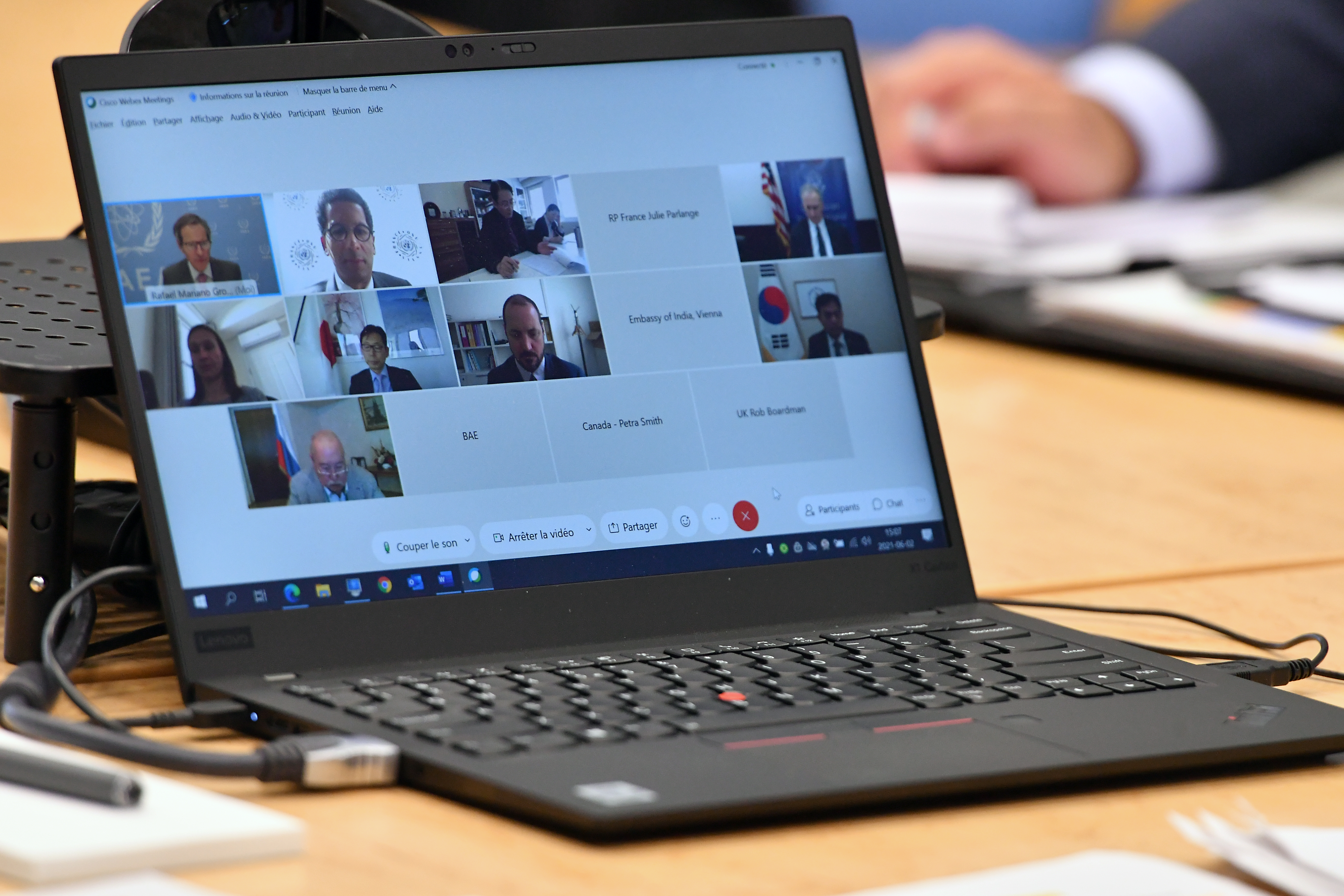
ThinkPad X1 Carbon Gen 7

In January 2019 at the Consumer Electronics Show (CES), Lenovo announced their seventh generation X1 Carbon, weighing 1.08 kilograms (2.4 lb). It came with the 8th generation Whiskey Lake Core i5 or i7 processors, up to 16 GiB of RAM, optional 4K display featuring Dolby Vision HDR, and a thinner chassis than the last generation. It also supports a new optional carbon fiber weave top cover.

==== X1 Yoga (4th Gen) ====
The design is derived from 7th generation ThinkPad X1 Carbon. This is notably the first ThinkPad with aluminum chassis. 15W 8th/10th generation Core i5/i7 quad core processors and a built-in stylus.

==== X1 Extreme (2nd Gen) ====
The updated version of first generation; the first non-Yoga ThinkPad laptop with an OLED screen option.

The sibling model is a ThinkPad P1 Gen 2.

Model	Release (US)	Dimensions	Weight ^{(min)}	CPU	Chipset	Memory ^{(max)}	Graphics	Storage	Networking	Audio	Screen	Battery	Other	Operating System
14"
X1 Carbon (7th Gen)	2019	323 × 217 × 15 mm	1.09 kg (2.4 lb)	8th or 10th Gen Intel Core		8/16 GiB LPDDR3 2133 MHz (soldered)	Intel UHD Graphics	One M.2 x4	Mini Gigabit Ethernet Intel Wireless-AC 9560 Wi-Fi + BT 5.0 (soldered); Optional WWAN M.2 x? Card (?)		Glare: 3840 × 2160 IPS Dolby Vision Anti-glare: 1920 × 1080 IPS; 1920 × 1080 IPS PrivacyGuard; 2560 × 1440 IPS Anti-reflection, anti-smudge: 1920 × 1080 Touch	m	ThinkShutter; Two TB3 x4	
X1 Yoga (4th Gen)	2019		1.36 kg (3.0 lb)	8th or 10th Gen Intel Core		8/16 GiB LPDDR3 — 2133 MHz (soldered)	Intel UHD Graphics	One M.2 x4	Mini Gigabit Ethernet Intel Wireless-AC 9560 Wi-Fi + BT 5.0 (soldered); Optional WWAN M.2 Card (?)		Anti-glare, anti-smudge: 1920×1080 IPS Touch; 1920×1080 IPS PrivacyGuard Touch; 2560×1440 IPS Touch; 3840×2160 IPS Touch	m	ThinkShutter; Two TB3 x4	
15.6"
X1 Extreme (2nd Gen)	2019	361.8 × 245.7 × 18.4 mm	1.7 kg (3.7 lb)	9th Gen Intel Core	Intel CM246	64 GiB DDR4 — 2666 MHz (2 slots)	Intel UHD 630 Optional + NVIDIA GTX 1650 Max-Q 4 GB	Two M.2 x4	Mini Gigabit Ethernet; Wi-Fi + BT M.2 Card		Anti-glare: 1920 × 1080 IPS; 1920 × 1080 IPS HDR; 3840 × 2160 IPS; 3840 × 2160 OLED Touch	m	ThinkShutter; Two TB3 x4	

=== 2020 ===
==== X1 Carbon Gen 8 ====
In January 2020 at the Consumer Electronics Show (CES), Lenovo announced their eighth generation X1 Carbon. It comes with 10th generation Intel Comet Lake processors, optional PrivacyGuard display, and WiFi 6 support. The Fedora Linux distribution is also offered pre-installed on the laptop.

==== X1 Yoga Gen 5 ====
The design is derived from 8th generation ThinkPad X1 Carbon. 10th generation Core i5/i7 quad core processors and a built-in stylus.

==== X1 Extreme Gen 3 ====
The update of 15 inch line; the last X1 ThinkPad line with non-reduced 1.8 mm key travel.

==== X1 Nano ====
Lenovo unveiled the first X1 Nano in September 2020. X1 Nano was the lightest ThinkPad ever at the time at just 1.99 pounds (907 g) and also Lenovo's first ThinkPad based on Intel Evo platform, powered by 11th Gen Intel Core processors. The machine has a 13-inch 16:10 screen with four speakers with Dolby Atmos and four 360-degree microphones.

==== X1 Fold ====
X1 Fold with 13.3 inch display.

Model	Release (US)	Dimensions	Weight ^{(min)}	CPU	Chipset	Memory ^{(max)}	Graphics	Storage	Networking	Audio	Screen	Battery	Other	Operating System
14"
X1 Carbon Gen 8	Jan 2020	323 mm × 217 mm × 15 mm (12.72 in × 8.54 in × 0.61 in)	1.09 kg (2.4 lb)	10th Gen Intel Core		8/16 GiB LPDDR3 2133 MHz (soldered)	Intel UHD Graphics	One M.2 x4	Mini Gigabit Ethernet Intel Wi-Fi 6 AX201 + BT 5.0 (soldered); Optional WWAN M.2 x? Card (?)		Anti-glare: 1920 × 1080 IPS; 1920 × 1080 IPS Touch; 1920 × 1080 IPS Touch PrivacyGuard; 2560 × 1440 IPS; Glossy: 3840 × 2160 IPS Dolby Vision DisplayHDR	m	ThinkShutter; Two TB3 x4	
X1 Yoga Gen 5	Jan 2020		1.36 kg (3.0 lb)	10th Gen Intel Core		8/16 GiB LPDDR3 — 2133 MHz (soldered)	Intel UHD Graphics	One M.2 x4	Mini Gigabit Ethernet Intel Wi-Fi 6 AX201 + BT 5.0 (soldered); Optional WWAN M.2 Card (?)		Anti-glare, anti-smudge: Anti-glare: 1920 × 1080 IPS Touch; 1920 × 1080 IPS Touch PrivacyGuard; 2560 × 1440 IPS Touch; Glossy: 3840 × 2160 IPS Touch Dolby Vision DisplayHDR	m	ThinkShutter; Two TB3 x4	
16"
X1 Extreme Gen 3	July 2020	362 mm × 246 mm × 19 mm (14.24 in × 9.67 in × 0.74 in)	1.7 kg (3.7 lb)	10th Gen Intel Core		64 GiB DDR4 — 2933 MHz (2 slots)	Intel UHD Graphics Optional + NVIDIA GTX 1650 Ti Max-Q 4 GB	Two M.2 x4	No onboard Ethernet Intel Wi-Fi 6 AX201 + BT 5.1 (soldered); Optional WWAN M.2 Card (?)		Anti-Glare: 1920 × 1080 IPS 300 nits 1920 × 1080 IPS 500 nits 3840 × 2160 IPS Anti-reflection, anti-smudge: 3840 × 2160 IPS Touch	m	Two TB3	
13.3"
X1 Nano Gen 1	Sep 2020	Non-touch: 292.8 × 207.7 × 13.87–16.7mm Touch: 292.9 × 207.8 × 14.27–17.2mm	0.907 kg (2.00 lb)	11th Gen Intel Core		8/16 GiB LPDDR4x 4267 MHz (soldered)	Intel Iris Xe	One M.2 x4	Intel Wi-Fi 6 AX201 + BT 5.1 (soldered); Optional: WWAN LTE 5G / LTE 4G CAT9		Touch: 13.0" 2160x1350 IPS, glossy with Dolby Vision Non-touch: 13.0" 2160 × 1350 IPS, anti-glare with Dolby Vision	m	ThinkShutter; Two TB4	
X1 Fold (Gen 1)	2020	158 mm × 236 mm × 28 mm (6.22 in × 9.28 in × 1.09 in)	0.999 kg (2.20 lb)	Core i5-L16G7		8 GiB LPDDR4 4266 MHz (soldered)	Intel UHD Graphics	One M.2 2242 x4	No onboard Ethernet Intel Wi-Fi 6 AX200 + BT 5.1 (soldered); Optional WWAN M.2 Snapdragon X55 5G Card (?)		Anti-Fingerprint: 4028 × 1536 Folding OLED Touch	m	Two USB-C 3.2	

=== 2021 ===
==== X1 Titanium Yoga Gen 1 ====
In 2021, Lenovo released the X1 Titanium Yoga, a 13.5-inch laptop with an 11th Gen Intel Core i5 or i7 processor and integrated Intel Iris Xe graphics.

==== X1 Carbon Gen 9 ====
In January 2021 at the Consumer Electronics Show (CES), Lenovo announced their ninth generation X1 Carbon. It comes with a 16:10 aspect ratio display, wider touchpad, and a larger battery.

==== X1 Extreme Gen 4 ====
Model	Release (US)	Dimensions	Weight ^{(min)}	CPU	Chipset	Memory ^{(max)}	Graphics	Storage	Networking	Audio	Screen	Battery	Other	Operating System
13.5"
X1 Titanium Yoga (Gen 1)	Jan 2021	297 mm × 233 mm × 11 mm (11.71 in × 9.16 in × 0.45 in)	1.15 kg (2.5 lb)	11th Gen Intel Core		8/16 GB LPDDR4 4266 MHz (soldered)	Intel Iris Xe	One M.2 x4	No onboard Ethernet; Intel Wi-Fi 6 AX201 + BT 5.1 (soldered) Optional WWAN M.2 x? Card (?)		Anti-reflection, anti-smudge: 2256 × 1504 IPS Touch	m	Two TB4/USB4 x4	Windows 11 Pro; Windows 11 Home; Windows 11 Home Single Language; Windows 11 DG Windows 10 Pro 64; Windows 10 Pro 64; Windows 10 Home 64; Windows 10 Home 64 Single Language; Linux; Ubuntu Linux
14"
X1 Carbon (Gen 9)	Jan 2021	315 mm × 221 mm × 15 mm (12.4 in × 8.72 in × 0.59 in)	1.1133 kg (2.454 lb)	11th Gen Intel Core		8/16/32 GB LPDDR4 4266 MHz (soldered)	Intel Iris Xe	One M.2 x4	No onboard Ethernet Intel Wi-Fi 6 AX201 + BT 5.1 (soldered); Intel Wi-Fi 6E AX211 + BT 5.1 (soldered); Optional WWAN M.2 x? Card (?)		Anti-Glare: 1920 × 1200 IPS; 1920 × 1200 IPS Touch; 1920 × 1200 IPS Touch Privacy Guard Glossy: 3840 × 2400 IPS	m	Two TB4/USB4 x4	Windows 11 Pro; Windows 11 Home; Windows 11 Home Single Language; Windows 11 DG Windows 10 Pro 64; Windows 10 Pro 64; Windows 10 Home 64; Windows 10 Home 64 Single Language; Linux; Ubuntu Linux
X1 Yoga (Gen 6)	Jan 2021	314 mm × 222 mm × 15 mm (12.38 in × 8.75 in × 0.61 in)	1.399 kg (3.08 lb)	11th Gen Intel Core		8/16/32 GB LPDDR4 4266 MHz (soldered)	Intel Iris Xe	One M.2 x4	No onboard Ethernet Intel Wi-Fi 6 AX201 + BT 5.1 (soldered); Intel Wi-Fi 6E AX211 + BT 5.1 (soldered); Optional WWAN M.2 x? Card (?)		Anti-glare: 1920 × 1200 IPS Touch; 1920 × 1200 IPS Touch Privacy Guard Anti-reflection, anti-smudge: 1920 × 1200 IPS Touch; 3840 × 2400 OLED Touch DisplayHDR 400	m	Two TB4/USB4 x4	
16"
X1 Extreme (Gen 4)	June 2021	359 mm × 254 mm × 18 mm (14.15 in × 9.99 in × 0.72 in)	1.81 kg (4.0 lb)	11th Gen Intel Core		64 GB DDR4 — 3200 MHz (2 slots)	Intel Iris Xe Optional; Nvidia; RTX 3050 Ti 4GB; RTX 3060 6GB; RTX 3070 8GB; RTX 3080 16GB	Two M.2 x4 RTX 3050 Ti One M.2 x4 RTX 3060; RTX 3070; RTX 3080	No onboard Ethernet Intel Wi-Fi 6E AX210 + BT 5.1 (soldered); Optional WWAN M.2 x? Card (?)		Anti-Glare: 2560 × 1600 IPS; 3840 × 2400 IPS Anti-reflection, anti-smudge: 3840 × 2400 IPS Touch	m	Two TB4/USB4 x4	

=== 2022 ===
==== X1 Carbon Gen 10 ====
A tenth generation was announced by Lenovo in January 2022. Beginning with the tenth generation, Lenovo used synaptic drivers that resolved the click-delay reported on earlier generations (7th-9th) which used Microsoft Precision drivers.

==== X1 Extreme Gen 5 ====
A 5th generation became available in June 2022

==== X1 Fold 16 Gen 1 ====
Lenovo introduced the new ThinkPad X1 Fold 16 laptop, and it began shipping in November.

==== X1 Nano Gen 2 ====
Model	Release (US)	Dimensions	Weight ^{(min)}	CPU	Chipset	Memory ^{(max)}	Graphics	Storage	Networking	Audio	Screen	Battery	Other	Operating System
14"
X1 Carbon (Gen 10)	Mar 2022	316 mm × 223 mm × 15 mm (12.43 in × 8.76 in × 0.59 in)	1.12 kg (2.5 lb)	12th Gen Intel Core U or P series		8/16/32 GB LPDDR5 5200 MHz (soldered)	Intel Iris Xe	One M.2 x4	No onboard Ethernet Intel Wi-Fi 6 AX201 + BT 5.1 (soldered); Intel Wi-Fi 6E AX211 + BT 5.1 (soldered); Optional WWAN M.2 x? Card (?)		Anti-Glare: 1920 × 1200 IPS; 1920 × 1200 IPS Touch; 1920 × 1200 IPS Touch Privacy Guard; 2240 × 1400 IPS Low Blue Light Anti-glare, anti-reflection, anti-smudge: 2880 × 1800 OLED DisplayHDR 3840 × 2400 IPS Film Touch; Glossy: 3840 × 2400 IPS	m	Two TB4/USB4 x4	
X1 Yoga (Gen 7)	Mar 2022	314 mm × 222 mm × 15 mm (12.38 in × 8.75 in × 0.61 in)	1.38 kg (3.0 lb)	12th Gen Intel Core U or P series		8/16/32 GB LPDDR5 5200 MHz (soldered)	Intel Iris Xe	One M.2 x4	No onboard Ethernet Intel Wi-Fi 6 AX201 + BT 5.1 (soldered); Intel Wi-Fi 6E AX211 + BT 5.1 (soldered); Optional WWAN M.2 x? Card (?)		Anti-glare: 1920 × 1200 IPS Touch; 1920 × 1200 IPS Touch Privacy Guard Anti-reflection, anti-smudge: 1920 × 1200 IPS Touch; 3840 × 2400 OLED Touch DisplayHDR 400	m	Two TB4/USB4 x4	
16"
X1 Extreme (Gen 5)	June 2022	359 mm × 254 mm × 18 mm (14.15 in × 9.99 in × 0.7 in)	1.88 kg (4.1 lb)	12th Gen Intel Core		64 GiB DDR5 — 4800 MHz (2 slots)	Intel Iris Xe Optional; Nvidia; RTX 3050 Ti 4GB; RTX 3060 6GB; RTX 3070 Ti 8GB; RTX 3080 Ti 16GB	Two M.2 x4 RTX 3050 Ti One M.2 x4 RTX 3060; RTX 3070 Ti; RTX 3080 Ti	No onboard Ethernet; Intel Wi-Fi 6E AX211 + BT 5.1 (soldered) Optional WWAN M.2 x? Card (?)		Anti-Glare: 1920 × 1200 IPS; 2560 × 1600 IPS; 3840 × 2400 IPS Anti-reflection, anti-smudge: 3840 × 2400 IPS Touch	m	Two TB4/USB4 x4	
X1 Fold 16 (Gen 1)	Nov 2022	176 mm × 276 mm × 18 mm (6.94 in × 10.87 in × 0.69 in)	1.26 kg (2.8 lb)	12th Gen Intel Core		8/16/32 GB LPDDR5 5200 MHz (soldered)	Intel Iris Xe	One M.2 x4	No onboard Ethernet Intel Wi-Fi 6E AX211 + BT 5.1 (soldered); Optional WWAN M.2 x? Card (?)		Anti-smudge: 2560 × 2024 Folding OLED Touch 16.3" when open and 12" when folded	m	Two TB4/USB4 x4	
13.3"
X1 Nano (Gen 2)	Jan 2022	Non-touch: 293 mm × 208 mm × 14 mm (11.54 in × 8.19 in × 0.57 in) Touch: 293 mm × 208 mm × 15 mm (11.55 in × 8.19 in × 0.58 in)	0.967 kg (2.13 lb)	12th Gen Intel Core P series		16/32 GB LPDDR5x 5200 MHz (soldered)	Intel Iris Xe	One M.2 x4	No onboard Ethernet Intel Wi-Fi 6E AX211 + BT 5.1 (soldered); Optional WWAN M.2 Card (?)		Anti-glare: 2160 × 1350 IPS Anti-glare, Anti-reflection, anti-smudge: 2160 × 1350 IPS Touch	m	Two TB4/USB4 x4	

=== 2023 ===
==== X1 Carbon Gen 11 ====
An eleventh generation was announced by Lenovo in December 2022. It uses recycled materials for the first time: up to 97 percent post-consumer plastic in some components, 90 percent recycled magnesium, and 55 percent recycled aluminium. This generation uses use Intel's 13th generation of Core mobile processors.

According to Lenovo UK site 32GB build is currently available with Core i5-1345U and Core i7-1365U "Select an i5-1345U/i7-1365U Processor for more memory options"

64 GB build is only be available with Core i7-1370P.

==== X1 Yoga Gen 8 ====
This announcement also included new versions of the X1 Yoga (14 inch).

==== X1 Nano Gen 3 ====
This announcement also included new versions of the X1 Nano (13 inch).

Model	Release (US)	Dimensions	Weight ^{(min)}	CPU	Chipset	Memory ^{(max)}	Graphics	Storage	Networking	Audio	Screen	Battery	Other	Operating System
14"
X1 Carbon (Gen 11)	Dec 2022	316 mm × 223 mm × 15 mm (12.43 in × 8.76 in × 0.59 in)	1.12 kg (2.5 lb)	13th Gen Intel Core; U or P series		16 GB LPDDR5 6400 MHz (soldered) 32 GB LPDDR5 6000 MHz (soldered) 64 GB LPDDR5 6000 MHz (soldered) with i7-1370P	Intel Iris Xe	One M.2 x4	No onboard Ethernet Intel Wi-Fi 6E AX211 + BT 5.1 (soldered); Optional WWAN M.2 x? Card (?)		Anti-Glare: 1920 × 1200 IPS; 1920 × 1200 IPS Touch; 1920 × 1200 IPS Touch Privacy Guard; 2240 × 1400 IPS Low Blue Light Anti-glare, anti-reflection, anti-smudge: 2880 × 1800 OLED DisplayHDR	m	Two TB4/USB4 x4	
X1 Yoga (Gen 8)	Apr 2023	314 mm × 222 mm × 15 mm (12.38 in × 8.75 in × 0.61 in)	1.38 kg (3.0 lb)	13th Gen Intel Core; U or P series		16 GB LPDDR5 6400 MHz (soldered) 32 GB LPDDR5 6000 MHz (soldered) 64 GB LPDDR5 6000 MHz (soldered) with i7-1370P	Intel Iris Xe	One M.2 x4	No onboard Ethernet Intel Wi-Fi 6E AX211 + BT 5.1 (soldered); Optional WWAN M.2 x? Card (?)		Anti-glare: 1920 × 1200 IPS Touch; 1920 × 1200 IPS Touch Privacy Guard Anti-reflection, anti-smudge: 1920 × 1200 IPS Touch; 3840 × 2400 OLED Touch DisplayHDR 400	m	Two TB4/USB4 x4	
13"
X1 Nano (Gen 3)	May 2023	Non-touch: 293 mm × 208 mm × 14 mm (11.54 in × 8.19 in × 0.57 in) Touch: 293 mm × 208 mm × 15 mm (11.55 in × 8.19 in × 0.58 in)	0.967 kg (2.13 lb)	13th Gen Intel Core; P series		16 GB LPDDR5x 6400 MHz (soldered)	Intel Iris Xe	One M.2 x4	No onboard Ethernet Intel Wi-Fi 6E AX211 + BT 5.1 (soldered); Optional WWAN M.2 Card (?)		Anti-glare: 2160 × 1350 IPS Anti-glare, Anti-reflection, anti-smudge: 2160 × 1350 IPS Touch	m	Two TB4/USB4 x4	

=== 2024 ===
==== X1 Carbon Gen 12 ====
A twelfth generation X1 Carbon was announced by Lenovo in December 2023. It is the world's first laptop to feature Intel's Core Ultra processors.

It is also the first X1 Carbon to feature a haptic touchpad option, which is supplied by Sensel. Sensel also supplied the haptic touchpads for the ThinkPad X1 Titanium Yoga (2021), ThinkPad X1 Fold 16 Gen 1 (2022), ThinkPad Z13 Gen 2 and Z16 Gen 2 (2023), and ThinkPad X1 2-in-1 Gen 9 (2024).

Model	Release (US)	Dimensions (mm / in)	Weight ^{(min)}	CPU	Memory ^{(max)}	Graphics	Storage	Networking	Audio	Screen	Battery	Other	Operating System
14"
Thinkpad X1 Carbon; Gen 12	March 2024	312.8 × 214.75 × 14.96; 12.31 × 8.45 × 0.59	1.08–1.09 kg (2.4–2.4 lb)	Intel Core Ultra; 5 125H; 5 125U; 5 135U; 7 155H; 7 155U; 7 165H; 7 165U NPU 11 TOPS	16 GB; 32 GB; 64 GB; LPDDR5x-7500 MHz; Soldered (6400Mhz due to platform limitations)	Intel Graphics (U-Series) Intel Arc Graphics (H-Series)	256GB; 512GB; 1TB; 2TB (Single NVME 2280 SSD)	No Onboard Ethernet; Wi-Fi 6E (AX211) + BT 5.3 (soldered); Wi-Fi 7 (BE200) + BT 5.4 (soldered); Optional WWAN Slot; Quectel EM160R-GL, 4G LTE CAT16; Quectel RM520N-GL, 5G Sub-6 GHz	High Definition (HD) Audio & Realtek ALC3306 with stereo speakers within Dolby Atmos and dual-microphone array, far-field with Dolby Voice	Anti-Glare: 1920x1200 IPS 400 nits No Touch; 60hz Anti-Glare: 1920x1200 IPS 400 nits Multi-Touch; 60hz Anti-Glare: 1920x1200 IPS 500 nits No Touch; 60hz Privacy Guard Anti-Reflection/Anti-Smudge: 2880x1800 OLED 400 nits No Touch; 120hz Anti-Reflection/Anti-Smudge: 2880x1800 OLED 400 nits Add-on Film Touch; 120hz	m 57Wh	Haptic Touchpad Optional NFC; Fingerprint Sensor Two TB4 + Two USB-A 5Gbps + One HDMI 2.1	Windows 11 Pro; Windows 11 Home; Windows 11 Home Single Language; Windows 11 DG Windows 10 Pro; Fedora Linux; Ubuntu Linux; Linux

==== X1 2-in-1 Gen 9 ====
A new iteration of the "Yoga" X1 version got renamed as 2-in-1 to avoid confusion with separate Lenovo Yoga line laptops. Sharing most of the technology with the X1 Carbon Gen 12.

Model	Release (US)	Dimensions (mm / in)	Weight ^{(min)}	CPU	Memory ^{(max)}	Graphics	Storage	Networking	Audio	Screen	Battery	Other	Operating System
14"
Thinkpad X1 2-in-1 Gen 9	May 2024	312.8 × 217.65 × 15.49; 12.31 × 8.57 × 0.61	1.35 kg (3.0 lb)	Intel Core Ultra; 5 125U; 5 135U; 7 155U; 7 165U NPU 11 TOPS	16 GB; 32 GB; 64 GB; LPDDR5x-7500 MHz; Soldered (6400Mhz due to platform limitations)	Intel Graphics (U-Series)	256GB; 512GB; 1TB; 2TB (Single NVME 2280 SSD)	No Onboard Ethernet Wi-Fi 6E (AX211) + BT 5.3 (soldered) Wi-Fi 7 (BE200) + BT 5.4 (soldered) Optional WWAN Slot; Quectel EM160R-GL, 4G LTE CAT16; Quectel RM520N-GL, 5G Sub-6 GHz	High Definition (HD) Audio & Realtek ALC3306 with stereo speakers within Dolby Atmos and Dual-microphone array, far-field with Dolby Voice	Anti-Reflection/Anti-Smudge: 1920x1200 IPS 400 nits Multi-Touch; 60hz Anti-Reflection/Anti-Smudge: 1920x1200 IPS 500 nits Multi Touch; 60hz Privacy Guard Anti-Reflection/Anti-Smudge: 2880x1800 OLED 400 nits Multi-Touch; 120hz	m 57Wh	Haptic Touchpad Optional NFC; Fingerprint Sensor Two TB4 + Two USB-A 5Gbps + One HDMI 2.1	Windows 11 Pro; Windows 11 Home; Windows 11 Home Single Language; Windows 11 DG Windows 10 Pro; Ubuntu Linux; Linux

==== X1 Carbon Gen 13 Aura Edition ====
Lenovo added the Microsoft Copilot button to the keyboard to promote and integrate Microsoft's AI assistant. The second hardware-button activates the Lenovo Aura Experience which helps sharing content between devices and more.

There is no 64 GB RAM option due to limitations of the Lunar Lake architecture.

Model	Release (US)	Dimensions (mm / in)	Weight ^{(min)}	CPU	Memory ^{(max)}	Graphics	Storage	Networking	Audio	Screen	Battery	Other	Operating System
14"
ThinkPad X1 Carbon; Gen 13	November 2024	312.8 × 214.75 × 8.08–14.77; 12.31 × 8.45 × 0.32–0.58	0.998–1.12 kg (2.20–2.47 lb)	Intel Core Ultra; 5 226V; 7 256V; 7 258V; 7 266V; 7 268V NPU 48 TOPS	16 GB; 32 GB; LPDDR5x-8533 MHz; Soldered	Intel Arc Graphics 130V (Core Ultra 5) Intel Arc Graphics 140V (Core Ultra 7)	256GB; 512GB; 1TB; 2TB (Single NVME 2280 SSD)	No Onboard Ethernet Wi-Fi 7 (BE201) + BT 5.4 (soldered) Optional WWAN Slot; Quectel RM520N-GL, 5G Sub-6 GHz	High Definition (HD) Audio & Realtek ALC3306 (U or H series), ALC713 (V series) with stereo speakers within Dolby Atmos and dual-microphone array, 360° far-field with Dolby Voice	Anti-Glare: 1920x1200 IPS 500 nits Multi-Touch 60 Hz; Anti-Glare/Anti- Reflection/Anti-Smudge: 2880x1800 OLED 400 nits Non-Touch 120 Hz; Anti-Glare/Anti- Reflection/Anti-Smudge: 2880x1800 OLED 500 nits Non-Touch 120 Hz VRR	m 57Wh	Haptic Touchpad Optional NFC; Fingerprint Sensor Two TB4 + Two USB-A 5Gbps + One HDMI 2.1	Windows 11 Home/Pro/Home Single Language; Fedora Linux; Ubuntu Linux; Linux

=== 2026 ===
Model	Release (US)	Dimensions	Weight ^{(min)}	CPU	Memory ^{(max)}	Graphics	Storage	Networking	Audio	Screen	Battery	Other	Operating System
14"
ThinkPad X1 Carbon Gen 14	May 2026	Non-touch: 312 mm × 216 mm × 17 mm (12.30 in × 8.49 in × 0.66 in) Touch: 312 mm × 216 mm × 18 mm (12.30 in × 8.49 in × 0.69 in)	0.977 kg (2.15 lb)	Intel Core Ultra; X7 368H; 5 325; 5 335; 7 355; 7 356H; 7 366H; X7 358H; NPU 48 TOPS	16 GB; 24 GB; 32 GB; 64 GB; LPDDR5X-7467; LPDDR5X-8533; LPDDR5X-9600; Soldered	Intel Arc Graphics B390	256GB / 512GB / 1TB PCIe Gen4V; 512GB / 1TB /2TB PCIe Gen5P (Single NVMe 2280 SSD)	No Onboard Ethernet Wi-Fi 7 (BE211) + BT 5.4 (soldered) Optional WWAN Slot; Snapdragon X12, 4G LTE CAT6; Snapdragon X61, 5G Sub-6 GHz	Stereo speakers within Dolby Atmos and dual-microphone array, 360° far-field	Anti-Glare: 1920x1200 IPS 500 nits In-cell Touch 60 Hz; Anti-Glare: 1920x1200 IPS PrivacyGuard 500 nits On-cell Touch 60 Hz; Anti-Glare: 2880x1800 OLED 500 nits Non-Touch 120 Hz VRR; Anti-Glare/Anti-Reflection/Anti-Smudge: 2880x1800 OLED 500 nits Non-Touch 120 Hz VRR; Anti-Glare/Anti-Reflection/Anti-Smudge: 2880x1800 OLED 500 nits Add-on film touch 120 Hz VRR	m 58Wh	Haptic Touchpad Optional NFC Fingerprint Sensor Two TB4 + Two USB-A 5Gbps + One HDMI 2.1	Windows 11 Home/Pro; Fedora Linux; Ubuntu Linux; Linux

== See also ==
- ThinkPad X Series
- ThinkPad Yoga Series
