= ThinkPad Yoga =

2-in-1 convertible business tablet by Lenovo

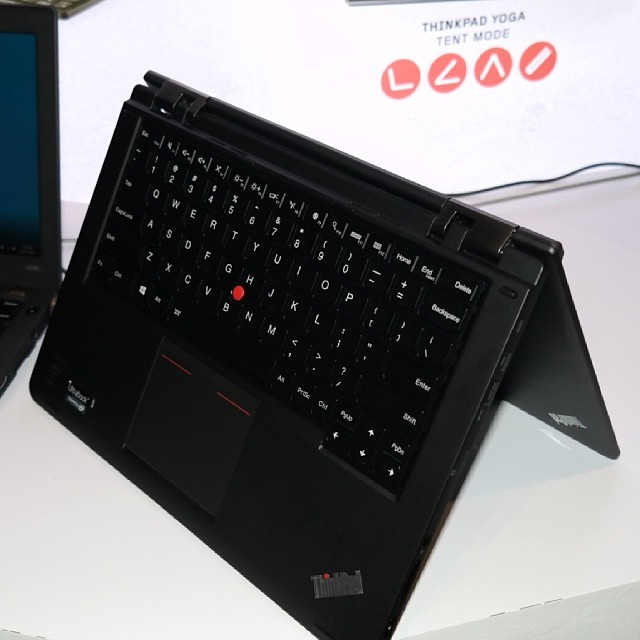
- ThinkPad Yoga in tent mode
- Developer: Lenovo
- Product family: ThinkPad
- Type: 2-in-1 PC Ultrabook
- Released: November 2013
- Operating system: Windows, ChromeOS
- CPU: Intel
- Marketing target: Business
- Predecessor: Thinkpad X230 Tablet
- Website: shop.lenovo.com/us/en/laptops/thinkpad/yoga-series/

The ThinkPad Yoga is a 2-in-1 convertible business-oriented tablet from Lenovo unveiled in September at the 2013 IFA in Berlin, Germany. It was released in the United States in November 2013.

== Design and performance ==
The ThinkPad Yoga series laptops have a "backlit" keyboard that flattens when flipped into tablet mode. This is accomplished with a platform surrounding the keys which rises until level with the keyboard buttons, a locking mechanism that prevents key presses, and feet that pop out to prevent the keyboard from directly resting on flat surfaces. Lenovo implemented this design in response to complaints about its earlier IdeaPad Yoga 13 and 11 models being awkward to use in tablet mode. A reinforced hinge was required to implement this design. Other than its convertible form factor, the first ThinkPad Yoga is a rather standard ThinkPad device with a black magnesium-reinforced chassis, island keyboard, a red TrackPoint, and a large buttonless touchpad (but touchpad have been upgraded to a mechanical 3-button version for a next generations of Yoga line).

== Models ==
Lenovo ThinkPad Yoga
Size	11.6"	12"	13"	13.5"	14"		
Type	Flipbook «2-in-1»						
Type	Affordable	Mainstream				Premium	Mobile workstation
2013		Yoga (Yoga 12)					
2014	11e Yoga	Yoga (Yoga 12)					Yoga 14
2015	11e Yoga	Yoga 260					Yoga 14
2016	11e Yoga; Gen 2	Yoga 260			460 Yoga	X1 Yoga; Gen 1	P40 Yoga
2017	11e Yoga; Gen 3		Yoga 370		replaced by X1 Yoga	X1 Yoga; Gen 2	
2018	11e Yoga; Gen 4		L380 Yoga		replaced by X1 Yoga	X1 Yoga; Gen 3	
2018	11e Yoga; Gen 4		X380 Yoga		replaced by X1 Yoga	X1 Yoga; Gen 3	
2019	11e Yoga; Gen 5		L390 Yoga		replaced by X1 Yoga	X1 Yoga; Gen 4	
2019	11e Yoga; Gen 5		X390 Yoga		replaced by X1 Yoga	X1 Yoga; Gen 4	
2020	11e Yoga; Gen 6		L13 Yoga		replaced by X1 Yoga	X1 Yoga; Gen 5	
2020	11e Yoga; Gen 6		X13 Yoga		replaced by X1 Yoga	X1 Yoga; Gen 5	
2021			L13 Yoga; Gen 2	X1 Titanium Yoga; Gen 1	replaced by X1 Yoga	X1 Yoga; Gen 6	
2021			X13 Yoga; Gen 2	X1 Titanium Yoga; Gen 1	replaced by X1 Yoga	X1 Yoga; Gen 6	
2021			C13 Yoga	X1 Titanium Yoga; Gen 1	replaced by X1 Yoga	X1 Yoga; Gen 6	

Battery configuration

Main	M(x)	Main hot-swappable (max.cells)	Secondary	U	Ultrabay removable
Main	M(x)	Main hot-swappable (max.cells)	Secondary	u	Ultrabay unremovable
Main	M(x)	Main removable (max.cells)	Secondary	m(x)	internal (max.cells) "PowerBridge"
Main	m(x)	Main internal (max.cells)	Secondary	S	Slice battery

Laptop color codes

Processor

Socketed desktop processor
Socketed mobile processor
Soldered high power processor
Soldered standard power processor
Soldered low power processor
Soldered ultra low power processor

Weight

0.9 kg (2.0 lb)	Up to 0.91 kg
1.0 kg (2.2 lb)	0.92–1.0 kg
1.1 kg (2.4 lb)	1.01–1.1 kg
1.2 kg (2.6 lb)	1.11–1.2 kg
1.3 kg (2.9 lb)	1.21–1.3 kg
1.4 kg (3.1 lb)	1.31–1.4 kg
1.5 kg (3.3 lb)	1.41–1.5 kg
1.6 kg (3.5 lb)	1.51–1.6 kg
1.7 kg (3.7 lb)	1.61–1.7 kg
1.8 kg (4.0 lb)	1.71–1.81 kg
1.9 kg (4.2 lb)	1.81–1.91 kg
2.0 kg (4.4 lb)	1.91–2.03 kg
2.1 kg (4.6 lb)	2.04–2.14 kg
2.3 kg (5.1 lb)	2.15–2.4 kg
2.5 kg (5.5 lb)	2.41–2.75 kg
2.8 kg (6.2 lb)	2.76–3.05 kg
3.1 kg (6.8 lb)	3.06–3.42 kg
3.5 kg (7.7 lb)	3.43–3.99 kg
4.0 kg (8.8 lb)	4.0–4.99 kg
5.5 kg (12 lb)	5.0–6.49 kg
7.2 kg (16 lb)	6.5–7.99 kg
9.1 kg (20 lb)	8.0–9.99 kg
10.7 kg (24 lb)	10–11.99 kg
12.7 kg (28 lb)	12–14.49 kg
14.5 kg (32 lb)	14.5–17.99 kg
18.1 kg (40 lb)	18–20.99 kg
21.7 kg (48 lb)	21–23.99 kg
24 kg (53 lb)	24–28.99 kg
29.5 kg (65 lb)	29 kg and above

Screen resolution

4K or higher
1440p+ (WQHD, QXGA)
1080p+ (Full HD, UXGA)
Better than 768p (SXGA,SXGA+)
600p+ (SVGA, HD, XGA, HD+)
Up to 600p (VGA)

Graphics

Dual standard socket graphics option
Dual proprietary socket graphics option
Standard socket graphics option
Proprietary socket graphics option
Soldered performance graphics option
Soldered midrange graphics option
Soldered mainstream graphics option
Soldered entry graphics option
Integrated entry graphics
Integrated basic graphics

Laptop storage combinations (excluding WWAN slot)

Level	PCIe 4.0 x4	PCIe 3.0 x4	PCIe 3.0 x2	M.2 SATA	mSATA	1.8" SATA	2.5" SATA	1.8" IDE	2.5" IDE
	2019; Not yet (laptops)	2013	2013	2013	2009	2003	2003	1991	1988
	3						2		
	4								
	3						1		
	2						2		
	3					2			
	3								
	2						1		
	4								
	3					1			
	2					2			
	2								
	1						1		
	3								
	2					1			
	1								
	2								
	1					1			
			2				1		
							4		
		1							
			1				1		
							3		
			1						
				1			1		
					1		1		
						1	1		
							2		
									3
						1			
							1		
									2
								1	
									1

Laptop memory

Amount	LPDDR5X	LPDDR5	DDR5	LPDDR4X	LPDDR4	DDR4	LPDDR3	DDR4	DDR3L		DDR3		DDR2		DDR	SDR	EDO	FPM
Amount						dual channel		< dual channel	dual channel	< dual channel	dual channel	< dual channel	dual channel	< dual channel				
Amount	2022 (laptops)	2019 (laptops)	2020	2017	2014	2014	2012	2014	2010		2007		2003		1998	1993	1993	1987
max memory = 512 GB	N/A	N/A	512 GB	N/A	N/A	N/A	N/A	N/A	N/A	N/A	N/A	N/A	N/A	N/A	N/A	N/A	N/A	N/A
max memory = 256 GB	N/A		256 GB (4 slots)	N/A	N/A	N/A	N/A	N/A	N/A	N/A	N/A	N/A	N/A	N/A	N/A	N/A	N/A	N/A
max memory = 128 GB	128 GB		128 GB	N/A	N/A	128 GB (4 slots)	N/A	N/A	N/A	N/A	N/A	N/A	N/A	N/A	N/A	N/A	N/A	N/A
64 GB ≤ max memory < 128 GB		64 GB		N/A	N/A	64 GB	N/A	64 GB (2 slots)	64 GB (4 slots)	N/A	N/A	N/A	N/A	N/A	N/A	N/A	N/A	N/A
32 GB ≤ max memory < 64 GB				32 GB	32 GB	32 GB	N/A		32 GB	32 GB (2 slots)	32 GB (4 slots)	N/A	N/A	N/A	N/A	N/A	N/A	N/A
16 GB ≤ max memory < 32 GB						16 GB	16 GB		16 GB		16 GB	16 GB (2 slots)	16 GB (4 slots)	N/A	N/A	N/A	N/A	N/A
8 GB ≤ max memory < 16 GB						8 GB			8 GB		8 GB		8 GB	8 GB (2 slots)	8 GB (4 slots)	N/A	N/A	N/A
4 GB ≤ max memory < 8 GB						4 GB			4 GB		4 GB		4 GB		4 GB	4 GB (4 slots)	4 GB (4 slots)	N/A
2 GB ≤ max memory < 4 GB						2 GB (8 chips)			2 GB		2 GB		2 GB			2 GB	2 GB	N/A
1 GB ≤ max memory < 2 GB			1 GB (1 chip)	dual channel min	dual channel min	N/A		single channel min	1 GB		1 GB		1 GB					1 GB (4 slots)
512 MB ≤ max memory < 1 GB	N/A	N/A	N/A	single channel min	single channel min	N/A	dual channel min	half channel min	512 MB (8 chips)		512 MB (8 chips)		512 MB					512 MB
256 MB ≤ max memory < 512 MB	N/A	N/A	N/A	256 MB (1 chip)	256 MB (1 chip)	N/A	single channel min	256 MB (1 chip)	N/A	single channel min	N/A	single channel min	256 MB					
128 MB ≤ max memory < 256 MB	N/A	N/A	N/A	N/A	N/A	N/A	128 MB (1 chip)	N/A	N/A	half channel min	N/A	half channel min						
64 MB ≤ max memory < 128 MB	N/A	N/A	N/A	N/A	N/A	N/A	N/A	N/A	N/A	64 MB (1 chip)	N/A	64 MB (1 chip)						
max memory < 64 MB	N/A	N/A	N/A	N/A	N/A	N/A	N/A	N/A	N/A	N/A	N/A	N/A						

=== 2013 ===
==== Thinkpad Yoga (S1 Yoga 12) ====
The first ThinkPad Yoga has a 12.5-inch IPS touchscreen with 1080p resolution. The screen was designed for use with an optional pen-style digitizer. It is powered by Haswell processors from Intel. Buyers are able to choose standard 2.5" hard drives or SSD, and additional M.2 SSD, but have a non-replaceable battery and soldered RAM.

Model	Release (US)	Dimensions	Weight ^{(min)}	CPU	Chipset	Memory ^{(max)}	Graphics	Storage	Networking	Audio	Screen	Battery	Other	Operating System
12.5"
Yoga 12	2013		1.58 kg (3.5 lb)	5th Gen Intel Core		4/8 GB — DDR3L 1600 MHz (soldered)	Intel HD 5500	One 2.5" SATA Drive; One M.2 SATA	Wi-Fi + BT M.2 Card		Glare, anti-smudge: 1366×768 IPS Touch; 1920×1080 IPS Touch Anti-glare, anti-smudge: 1920×1080 IPS Touch	m		Windows 7 Professional (64-bit, via downgrade rights) Windows 8.1 Core or Pro

=== 2014 ===
==== 11e Yoga (Windows version) ====
Lenovo ThinkPad Yoga 11e (Windows Version)
- Type: 2-in-1 PC
- Media: 1 x SATA (500 GB HDD)
- Operating system: Windows 8.1, Windows 10
- CPU: Intel Celeron N2940 (2MB Cache, Up To 2.25GHz) or Core M-5Y10c
- Memory: 8GB max DDR3L 1600 MHz
- Display: 11.6 in (29 cm), 1366×768 (HD) LED IPS with touchscreen
- Graphics: Intel HD
- Sound: Dolby Advanced Audio v2
- Input: Keyboard, touchpad
- Camera: 720p HD webcam
- Connectivity: USB 3.0 input, USB 2.0, HDMI 1.4, SD card reader, RJ-45 and a headphone/microphone port.
- Dimensions: W×H×D 11.8 in (30 cm) × 7.9 in (20 cm) × 0.827 in (2.10 cm)
- Weight: 3.3 lb (1.5 kg)

The Windows version has the same specs as the Chromebook, but comes with a 320GB hard drive for storage and also accepts SSDs. The memory can be upgraded up to 8GB. Unlike the Chromebook variant, the components of this version can be upgraded.

The 11e fully supports the openSUSE flavor of the Linux operating system.

==== 11e Yoga Chromebook ====
The ThinkPad 11e is a Chromebook that has a matte black chassis with reinforced hinges and corners, a sturdy lid, and a rubber bumper protecting its display in order to help it survive accidental dropping, spills, and general rough handling. It uses a quad-core Intel Celeron CPU, has 4 GB of RAM which can not be upgraded, an 11.6 inch screen, and 16GB of eMMC flash storage. Reviewers claim it is somewhat heavier than a typical Chromebook with a weight of 3.1 pounds. This is likely because of its ruggedized and reinforced chassis.

It uses typical ThinkPad-style keyboard with customized ChromeOS keys. It does not have Trackpoint but only a touchpad. The screen is matte with and anti-glare coating and has a resolution of 1366×768 pixels. A 720p webcam is mounted above the screen. It has media card reader, a USB 2.0 port, a USB 3.0 port, and HDMI 1.4 port and a headphone jack. Connectivity is provided by 802.11ac Wi-Fi and Bluetooth 4.0.

==== S3 Yoga 14 ====
The Yoga 14 model reportedly "strikes the middle ground between bulky workstations and flexible hybrids." The laptop's metal hinge makes it sturdy, flexible and durable but has a below-average battery life. Like other models, the display can bend a full 360 degrees and the keyboard can be folded in half to use as a stand. According to a review for Business News Daily, "The ThinkPad Yoga 14 is a balancing act of diverse features. Thankfully, Lenovo pulled them all together into a satisfying work machine. The notebook features a high-quality build and an excellent keyboard and trackpad — all must-have features for serious productivity. And extras like the TrackPoint pointing stick are great for legacy ThinkPad users who prefer those options."

==== S5 Yoga 15 ====
Model	Release (US)	Dimensions	Weight ^{(min)}	CPU	Chipset	Memory ^{(max)}	Graphics	Storage	Networking	Audio	Screen	Battery	Other	Operating System
11.6"
11e Yoga	2014		1.59 kg (3.5 lb)	Intel Celeron		8 GB — DDR3L 1600 MHz (1 slot)	Intel HD Graphics	One 2.5" SATA 7mm Drive	Gigabit Ethernet; Wi-Fi + BT M.2 Card	style="background:#FFB; color:black;vertical-align:middle;text-align:center; " class="table-partial"|1366×768 IPS Touch	m	NO TrackPoint		Windows 8.1 Core or Pro (64-bit)
11e Yoga Chromebook	2014		1.4 kg (3.1 lb)	Intel Celeron		2/4 GB — DDR3L 1600 MHz (soldered)	Intel HD Graphics	16 GB eMMC (soldered)	Wi-Fi + BT M.2 Card	style="background:#FFB; color:black;vertical-align:middle;text-align:center; " class="table-partial"|Anti-glare: 1366×768	m	NO TrackPoint		ChromeOS
14"
Yoga 14	2014		1.9 kg (4.2 lb)	5th Gen Intel Core		16 GB DDR3L 1600 MHz (1 slot)	Intel HD 5500 + Nvidia Geforce 840M or 940M (2GB DDR3)	One 2.5" SATA Drive	Wi-Fi + BT M.2 Card	style="background-color: var(--background-color-base, #fff); color:var(--color-base, #202122); vertical-align: middle; text-align: center; " class="table-no" | Anti-glare: 1920×1080 IPS Touch	m			Windows 7 Professional (64-bit, via downgrade rights) Windows 8.1 Core or Pro
15.6"
Yoga 15	2014		2.3 kg (5.1 lb)	5th Gen Intel Core		32 GB DDR3L 1600 MHz (2 slots)	Intel HD 5500 + Nvidia Geforce 840M (2GB DDR3)	One 2.5" SATA Drive	Wi-Fi + BT M.2 Card; Optional WWAN M.2 SATA Card	style="background-color: var(--background-color-base, #fff); color:var(--color-base, #202122); vertical-align: middle; text-align: center; " class="table-no" | Glare: 1920×1080 IPS Touch Anti-glare: 1920×1080 IPS Touch	m			Windows 7 Professional (64-bit, via downgrade rights) Windows 8.1 Core or Pro

=== 2015 ===
==== Yoga 260 ====
The Yoga 260 uses a lightweight carbon-fiber hybrid material on its lid and magnesium-plastic blend on its lower portion. Lenovo claims the Yoga 260 has been subject to extensive testing of its ability to survive extreme temperatures, vibrations, altitudes, and shocks. Its keyboard is spill resistant. It includes a 12.5-inch display of resolution 1366×768 or 1920×1080. An active stylus, the ThinkPad Pen Pro, is included for drawing and text entry; it can be used with Lenovo's WRITEit hand-writing recognition application. A large fingerprint reader is included for logging into a user account.

The design of Yoga 260 is in the same generation as the ThinkPad X260, which features 6th generation Intel Core i processors, same display resolution choices, same supported operating systems.

==== Yoga 460 and P40 Yoga ====
Yoga 460 is a base model with only integrated graphics.

The ThinkPad P40 Yoga, like other Yoga branded products, is a convertible device with "laptop, stand, tent, and tablet" modes. The P40 Yoga includes a touchscreen display with resolution of 1920×1080 or 2560×1440, designed in cooperation with Wacom, using that company's Active ES technology which can sense 2,048 different pressure levels. The screen works with a stylus called the ThinkPad Pen Pro that has various pen tips designed to give varied forms of tactile feedback. The P40 uses Intel Core i7 CPUs, can accommodate up to 16 gigabytes of RAM, has SSDs up to 512 gigabytes in size, and uses an Nvidia Quadro M500M GPU.

Model	Release (US)	Dimensions	Weight ^{(min)}	CPU	Chipset	Memory ^{(max)}	Graphics	Storage	Networking	Audio	Screen	Battery	Other	Operating System
11.6"
11e Yoga (2nd Gen)	2015		1.59 kg (3.5 lb)	Intel Core m		4/8 GB — DDR3L 1600 MHz (soldered)	Intel HD Graphics	One 2.5" SATA 7mm Drive	Gigabit Ethernet; Wi-Fi + BT M.2 Card	style="background:#FFB; color:black;vertical-align:middle;text-align:center; " class="table-partial"|1366×768 IPS Touch	m	NO TrackPoint		Windows 8.1 or Windows 10
12.5"
Yoga 260	2015	17.8 x 309.9 x 220	1.32 kg (2.9 lb)	6th Gen Intel Core		8 GB — DDR4 2133 MHz (soldered, WWAN) or 32 GB — DDR4 2133 MHz (1 slot, NO WWAN)	Intel HD Graphics 520	One M.2 x4	OneLink+ Gigabit Ethernet; Wi-Fi + BT M.2 Card; Optional WWAN M.2 Card (exclusive)	style="background-color: var(--background-color-base, #fff); color:var(--color-base, #202122); vertical-align: middle; text-align: center; " class="table-no" | Anti-glare: 1366×768 IPS Touch; 1920×1080 IPS Touch	m			Windows 8.1 or Windows 10
14"
Yoga 460	2015	19.9 × 338 × 236	1.8 kg (4.0 lb)	6th Gen Intel Core		16 GB DDR3L 1600 MHz (1 slot)	Intel HD 520	One 2.5" SATA Drive	OneLink+ Gigabit Ethernet; Wi-Fi + BT M.2 Card; Optional WWAN M.2 SATA Card		Glare: 1920×1080 IPS Touch; 2560×1440 IPS Touch Anti-glare: 1920×1080 IPS Touch	m (3) (53 Whr)		Windows 10
P40 Yoga	2015	19.9 × 338 × 236	1.83 kg (4.0 lb)	6th Gen Intel Core i7-6500U (2C4T 2.5 GHz / 3.1GHz Turbo) i7-6600U (2C4T 2.6GHz / 3.4GHz Turbo)		16 GB DDR3L 1600 MHz (1 slot)	Intel HD 520 + Nvidia Quadro M500M (2GB DDR3)	One 2.5" SATA Drive	OneLink+ Gigabit Ethernet; Wi-Fi + BT M.2 Card; Optional WWAN M.2 SATA Card		Glare: 2560×1440 IPS Touch Anti-glare: 1920×1080 IPS Touch	m (3) (53 Whr)		Windows 7 Professional (64-bit, via downgrade rights) Windows 10

=== 2016 ===
==== X1 Yoga ====
The ThinkPad X1 Yoga is a revamp of the ThinkPad X1 Carbon that includes the multi-mode flexibility of the Yoga line and a 14-inch display with optional OLED technology. The display has a resolution of 2560×1440 pixels. It weighs about 1.3 kg (2.8 pounds).

Model	Release (US)	Dimensions	Weight ^{(min)}	CPU	Chipset	Memory ^{(max)}	Graphics	Storage	Networking	Audio	Screen	Battery	Other	Operating System
11.6"
11e Yoga (3rd Gen)	2016		1.59 kg (3.5 lb)	Celeron, Pentium, or 6th Gen Intel Core i3		16 GB — DDR3L 1600 MHz (1 slot)	Intel HD Graphics (Celeron) or HD Graphics 510 or 520	One M.2 SATA	Gigabit Ethernet; Wi-Fi + BT M.2 Card	style="background:#FFB; color:black;vertical-align:middle;text-align:center; " class="table-partial"|Glare: 1366×768 IPS Touch	m	NO TrackPoint		
11e Yoga Chromebook (3rd Gen)	2016		1.5 kg (3.3 lb)	Intel Celeron		2/4 GB — LPDDR3 1600 MHz (soldered)	Intel HD Graphics	16 GB eMMC (soldered)	Wi-Fi + BT M.2 Card	style="background:#FFB; color:black;vertical-align:middle;text-align:center; " class="table-partial"|Glare: 1366×768 IPS Touch	m	NO TrackPoint		
14"
X1 Yoga	2016		1.36 kg (3.0 lb)	6th Gen Intel Core		8/16 GB LPDDR3 — 1866 MHz (soldered)	Intel HD Graphics 520	One M.2 x4	OneLink+ Gigabit Ethernet; Wi-Fi + BT M.2 Card; Optional WWAN M.2 Card (?)		Glare: 2560×1440 OLED Touch Anti-glare: 1920×1080 IPS Touch; 2560×1440 IPS Touch	m		

=== 2017 ===
==== Yoga 370 ====
A 13.3 inch replacement for the Yoga 260, with 7th generation Intel Core processors.

==== X1 Yoga (2nd Gen) ====
Changes from previous X1 Yoga includes the use of 7th generation Intel Core i ('Kaby Lake') processors, addition of Thunderbolt 3 ports, USB-C connector for power adapter, 'wave' style keyboard featuring matte finish on the keyboard.

Model	Release (US)	Dimensions	Weight ^{(min)}	CPU	Chipset	Memory ^{(max)}	Graphics	Storage	Networking	Audio	Screen	Battery	Other	Operating System
11.6"
11e Yoga (4th Gen)	2017		1.59 kg (3.5 lb)	Celeron, or 7th Gen Intel Core i3 or i5		8 GB — DDR3L 1866 MHz (Celeron) or 32 GB DDR4 2133 MHz (1 slot)	Intel HD Graphics 500 (Celeron) or HD Graphics 620	One M.2 SATA	Gigabit Ethernet; Wi-Fi + BT M.2 Card	style="background:#FFB; color:black;vertical-align:middle;text-align:center; " class="table-partial"|Anti-glare: 1366×768 IPS Touch	m	NO TrackPoint		
11e Yoga Chromebook (4th Gen)	2017		1.45 kg (3.2 lb)	Intel Celeron		4 GB — LPDDR4 3200 MHz (soldered)	Intel HD Graphics 500	32 GB eMMC (soldered)	Wi-Fi + BT M.2 Card	style="background:#FFB; color:black;vertical-align:middle;text-align:center; " class="table-partial"|Anti-glare: 1366×768 Touch	m	NO TrackPoint		
13.3"
Yoga 370	2017		1.37 kg (3.0 lb)	7th Gen Intel Core		8 GB — DDR4 2133 MHz (soldered, WWAN) or 32 GB — DDR4 2133 MHz (1 slot, NO WWAN)	Intel HD Graphics 620	One M.2 x4	Mini Gigabit Ethernet; Wi-Fi + BT M.2 Card; Optional WWAN	style="background-color: var(--background-color-base, #fff); color:var(--color-base, #202122); vertical-align: middle; text-align: center; " class="table-no" | Anti-reflective (glossy, ploarized), anti-smudge: 1920×1080 IPS Touch	m	One TB3 x2		
14"
X1 Yoga (2nd Gen)	2017		1.36 kg (3.0 lb)	7th Gen Intel Core i7 vPro		8/16 GB LPDDR3 — 1866 MHz (soldered) 2133 MHz	Intel HD Graphics 620	One M.2 x4	Mini Gigabit Ethernet; Wi-Fi + BT M.2 Card; Optional WWAN		Anti-reflective (glossy, ploarized), anti-smudge: 1920×1080 IPS Touch; 2560×1440 IPS Touch Glare, anti-smudge: 2560×1440 OLED OCTA Touch	m	Two TB3 x4 Soldered charging port	

=== 2018 ===
Two Thinkpad Yoga 11e (5th Gen)

==== 11e Yoga (5th Gen) ====
The ThinkPad 11e Yoga is a predecessor to the 4th Gen ThinkPad Yoga 11e. The 5th gen is more robust with rubberized bumpers, reinforced ports and hinges and can be dropped up to 90 cm (35") mainly used in schools or classrooms

The 11e Yoga had an optional ThinkPad Pen Pro that went into the bottom left of the device; if the pen wasn't bought as an optional, it would get a blank plug that went where the Pen Pro slot went.

Model	Release (US)	Dimensions	Weight ^{(min)}	CPU	Chipset	Memory ^{(max)}	Graphics	Storage	Networking	Audio	Screen	Battery	Other	Operating System	Notes
11.6"															
Yoga 11e (5th Gen)	2018		1.54 kg (3.4 Ib)	Intel Pentium Silver N5030 Intel Celeron N4120		4/8 GB DDR4 2400MHz (soldered)	Integrated Intel UHD Graphics 605 Intel UHD Graphics 600	One M.2 SSD	Gigabit Ethernet + Wi-Fi + BT M.2 Card	Dolby Audio	1366 x 768 IPS touch	m (42 Whr)	Optional Pen	Windows 10 Windows 10 education Windows 11 Home	Supported ThinkPad Pen Pro
11e (5th Gen)	2018		1.54 kg (3.4 Ib)	Intel Pentium Silver N5030 Intel Celeron N4120		4/8 GB DDR4 2400MHz (soldered)	Integrated Intel UHD Graphics 605 Intel UHD Graphics 600	One M.2 SSD 64GB eMMC	Gigabit Ethernet + Wi-Fi + BT M.2 Card	Dolby Audio	1366 x 768 IPS touch 1366 x 768 TN (No Touch)	m (42 Whr)		Windows 10 Ubuntu Linux (Upgradeable to Windows 11)	No 360/Tent Optional

==== L380 Yoga ====
More affordable version of the X380 Yoga, with replaceable RAM, but lacking Thunderbolt.

==== X380 Yoga ====
A smaller 13.3" derivative of the X1 Yoga.

Feature	L380 Yoga	X380 Yoga
Positioning	More affordable version of the X380 Yoga	High-end, smaller derivative of X1 Yoga
Display Size	13.3"	13.3"
RAM	Replaceable/Upgradeable	Soldered (non-replaceable)
Thunderbolt Support	No Thunderbolt port	Includes Thunderbolt port
Portability	Slightly bulkier (assumed for L-series)	More compact and lightweight
Build Quality	Standard (cost-effective materials)	Premium (aluminum/carbon fiber)
Target Audience	Budget-conscious users, students	Business professionals, premium users
Price Range	More affordable	Higher price point

=== Additional Notes ===
- The L380 Yoga is designed to be a more budget-friendly option, sacrificing some premium features like Thunderbolt and possibly build quality to achieve a lower price point.
- The X380 Yoga is positioned as a premium device, offering a more compact design, better materials, and additional features like Thunderbolt for professionals who need high performance and portability.
- Both devices are part of Lenovo's Yoga lineup, which emphasizes 2-in-1 convertible designs with touchscreens and stylus support.

==== X1 Yoga (3rd Gen) ====
The design is derived from 6th generation ThinkPad X1 Carbon, with the ThinkShutter privacy camera included by default (except for models with a IR camera), 15W 8th generation Core i5/i7 quad core processors and a built-in stylus. OLED screens are no longer an option.

Model	Release (US)	Dimensions	Weight ^{(min)}	CPU	Chipset	Memory ^{(max)}	Graphics	Storage	Networking	Audio	Screen	Battery	Other	Operating System
11.6"
11e Yoga (5th Gen)	2018		1.54 kg (3.4 lb)	7th Gen Intel Core m, i5 Y, Celeron, or Pentium Silver		4/8 GB — LPDDR3 1866 MHz or DDR4 2400 MHz (soldered)	Intel HD Graphics 615, or UHD Graphics 600 or 605	eMMC (soldered) or One M.2 x2	Gigabit Ethernet; Wi-Fi + BT M.2 Card	style="background:#FFB; color:black;vertical-align:middle;text-align:center; " class="table-partial"|Glare: 1366×768 IPS Touch	m	NO TrackPoint		
13.3"
L380 Yoga	2018		1.56 kg (3.4 lb)	7th or 8th Gen Intel Core		64 GB DDR4 — 2133 (7th Gen) or 2400 MHz (2 slots)	Intel HD Graphics 620 (7th Gen) or Intel UHD Graphics 620 (8th Gen)	One M.2 x4	Mini Gigabit Ethernet; Wi-Fi + BT M.2 Card	style="background-color: var(--background-color-base, #fff); color:var(--color-base, #202122); vertical-align: middle; text-align: center; " class="table-no" | Anti-glare: 1920×1080 IPS; 1920×1080 IPS Touch	m	Soldered charging port		
X380 Yoga	2018		1.43 kg (3.2 lb)	7th or 8th Gen Intel Core		8/16 GB DDR4 — 2400 MHz (soldered)	Intel HD Graphics 620 (7th Gen) or Intel UHD Graphics 620 (8th Gen)	One M.2 x4	Mini Gigabit Ethernet; Wi-Fi + BT M.2 Card; Optional WWAN M.2 Card (?)	style="background-color: var(--background-color-base, #fff); color:var(--color-base, #202122); vertical-align: middle; text-align: center; " class="table-no" | Anti-reflective (glossy, ploarized), anti-smudge: 1920×1080 IPS Touch	m	One TB3 x2		
14"
X1 Yoga (3rd Gen)	2018		1.4 kg (3.1 lb)	7th or 8th Gen Intel Core		8/16 GB LPDDR3 — 2133 MHz (soldered)	Intel HD Graphics 620 (6th Gen) or Intel UHD Graphics 620 (7th Gen)	One M.2 x4	Mini Gigabit Ethernet; Wi-Fi + BT M.2 Card; Optional WWAN		Anti-reflective (glossy, ploarized): 1920×1080 IPS Touch; 2560×1440 IPS Touch	m	ThinkShutter; Two TB3 x4	

=== 2019 ===
==== L390 Yoga ====
More affordable version of the X390 Yoga with replaceable RAM, but lacking thunderbolt.

==== X390 Yoga ====
A smaller 13.3" derivative of the X1 Yoga.

==== X1 Yoga (4th Gen) ====
The design is derived from 7th generation ThinkPad X1 Carbon. This is notably the first ThinkPad with aluminum chassis. 15W 8th/10th generation Core i5/i7 quad core processors and a built-in stylus.

Model	Release (US)	Dimensions	Weight ^{(min)}	CPU	Chipset	Memory ^{(max)}	Graphics	Storage	Networking	Audio	Screen	Battery	Other	Operating System
13.3"
L390 Yoga	2019		1.56 kg (3.4 lb)	8th Gen Intel Core		64 GB DDR4 — 2400 MHz (2 slots)	Intel UHD Graphics	One M.2 x4	Mini Gigabit Ethernet; Wi-Fi + BT M.2 Card	style="background-color: var(--background-color-base, #fff); color:var(--color-base, #202122); vertical-align: middle; text-align: center; " class="table-no" | Anti-glare: 1920×1080 IPS Touch	m			
X390 Yoga	2019		1.29 kg (2.8 lb)	8th Gen Intel Core		8/16 GB DDR4 — 2400 MHz (soldered)	Intel UHD Graphics	One M.2 x4	Mini Gigabit Ethernet Intel Wireless-AC 9560 Wi-Fi or Wi-Fi 6 AX200 + BT 5.0 (soldered); Optional WWAN M.2 Card (?)	style="background-color: var(--background-color-base, #fff); color:var(--color-base, #202122); vertical-align: middle; text-align: center; " class="table-no" | Anti-reflective (glossy, ploarized), anti-smudge: 1920×1080 IPS Touch	m	ThinkShutter; One TB3 x2		
14"
X1 Yoga (4th Gen)	2019		1.36 kg (3.0 lb)	8th or 10th Gen Intel Core		8/16 GB LPDDR3 — 2133 MHz (soldered)	Intel UHD Graphics	One M.2 x4	Mini Gigabit Ethernet Intel Wireless-AC 9560 Wi-Fi + BT 5.0 (soldered); Optional WWAN M.2 Card (?)		Anti-reflective (glossy, ploarized), anti-smudge: 1920×1080 IPS Touch; 1920×1080 IPS PrivacyGuard Touch; 2560×1440 IPS Touch; 3840×2160 IPS Touch	m	ThinkShutter; Two TB3 x4	

=== 2020 ===
==== L13 Yoga (1st Gen) ====
Released on the 27 August 2019, the more affordable version of the X13 Yoga, but lacking thunderbolt. Successor of the L390 which breaks the naming scheme. It no longer has replaceable RAM.

==== X13 Yoga (1st Gen) ====
Released on the 24 February 2020, the smaller 13.3" derivative of the X1 Yoga. Successor of the X390 which breaks the naming scheme.

==== X1 Yoga (5th Gen) ====
The design is derived from 8th generation ThinkPad X1 Carbon. 10th generation Core i5/i7 quad core processors and a built-in stylus.

Model	Release (US)	Dimensions	Weight ^{(min)}	CPU	Chipset	Memory ^{(max)}	Graphics	Storage	Networking	Screen	Battery	Other
11.6"
11e Yoga (6th Gen)	2020	19.9 x 293 x 207	1.41 kg (3.1 lb)	8th Gen Intel Core m or i5 Y		4/8 GB LPDDR3 — 1866 or 2133 MHz (soldered)	Intel HD Graphics 615	One M.2 x2	Wi-Fi + BT M.2 Card	Glare: 1366×768 IPS Touch	m	NO TrackPoint
13.3"
L13 Yoga	2019		1.43 kg (3.2 lb)	10th Gen Intel Core		4/8/16 GB DDR4 — 2666 MHz (soldered)	Intel UHD Graphics	One M.2 x4	Mini Gigabit Ethernet; Wi-Fi + BT M.2 Card	Anti-glare: 1920×1080 IPS Touch	m	ThinkShutter
X13 Yoga	2020		1.25 kg (2.8 lb)	10th Gen Intel Core		8/16 GB DDR4 — 2666 MHz (soldered)	Intel UHD Graphics	One M.2 x4	Mini Gigabit Ethernet Intel Wi-Fi 6 AX201 + BT 5.0 (soldered); Optional WWAN M.2 Card (?)	Anti-reflective (glossy, ploarized), anti-smudge: 1920×1080 WVA Touch; 1920×1080 WVA Low Power Touch; 1920×1080 WVA PrivacyGuard Touch; 3840×2160 OLED Touch	m	ThinkShutter; One TB3 x?
14"
X1 Yoga (5th Gen)	2020		1.36 kg (3.0 lb)	10th Gen Intel Core		8/16 GB LPDDR3 — 2133 MHz (soldered)	Intel UHD Graphics	One M.2 x4	Mini Gigabit Ethernet Intel Wi-Fi 6 AX201 + BT 5.0 (soldered); Optional WWAN M.2 Card (?)	Anti-reflective (glossy, ploarized), anti-smudge: 1920×1080 IPS Touch; 1920×1080 IPS PrivacyGuard Touch; 2560×1440 IPS Touch; 3840×2160 IPS Touch	m	ThinkShutter; Two TB3 x4

=== 2021 ===
==== X1 Yoga Gen 6 ====
Model	Release (US)	Dimensions	Weight ^{(min)}	CPU	Chipset	Memory ^{(max)}	Graphics	Storage	Networking	Audio	Screen	Battery	Other	Operating System
14"
X1 Yoga (6th Gen)	2021	314.4 x 223 x 14.99 mm (12.38 x 8.78 x 0.59 inches)	1.399 kg (3.08 lb)	11th Gen Intel Core		8/16/32 GB LPDDR4x — 4266 MHz (soldered)	Intel Iris Xe	One M.2 2280 x4	Wi-Fi 6 AX201 11AX + BT 5.2 (soldered); Optional WWAN M.2 Card (?)	High Definition (HD) Audio & Realtek ALC3306 with stereo speakers between woofers andtweeters with Dolby Atmos and quad-microphone array, 360° far-field with Dolby Voice	Anti-reflective (glossy, ploarized), anti-smudge: 1920×1200 IPS Touch; 1920×1200 IPS MultiTouch 100%sRGB; 3840×2160 IPS MultiTouch DCI-P3 HDR	57Wh	ThinkShutter; Two TB4 x4; Two USB 3.2 Type-A	

=== 2022 ===
Model	Release (US)	Dimensions	Weight ^{(min)}	CPU	Chipset	Memory ^{(max)}	Graphics	Storage	Networking	Audio	Screen	Battery	Other	Operating System

=== 2023 ===
Model	Release (US)	Dimensions	Weight ^{(min)}	CPU	Chipset	Memory ^{(max)}	Graphics	Storage	Networking	Audio	Screen	Battery	Other	Operating System

=== 2024 ===
Model	Release (US)	Dimensions	Weight ^{(min)}	CPU	Chipset	Memory ^{(max)}	Graphics	Storage	Networking	Audio	Screen	Battery	Other	Operating System

=== 2025 ===
Model	Release (US)	Dimensions	Weight ^{(min)}	CPU	Chipset	Memory ^{(max)}	Graphics	Storage	Networking	Audio	Screen	Battery	Other	Operating System

== Reviews ==
Dan Ackerman of CNET wrote, "In our brief hands-on time with the ThinkPad Yoga, while it's made of tough, light magnesium alloy, it didn't feel as slick and coffee shop ready as the IdeaPad version (and it lacks the extremely high-res screen of the Yoga 2), but the hidden keyboard think [sic] is so fascinating, you'll find yourself folding the lid back and forth over and over again just to watch it in action."

Brittany Hillen of Slashgear wrote, "The ThinkPad Yoga is a hybrid machine with a lot to offer users as both a laptop and as a tablet, though in slate mode it is thicker than what you'd get with a traditional tablet. There is nothing ill to speak of regarding the ThinkPad Yoga -- everything about it is solid, with the exception perhaps being a lower quality stylus than what an artist would need. The construction feels solid and durable in the hands, the keyboard is comfortable for typing in long duration stints, and the hardware is capable for a variety of tasks."

James Kendrick of ZDNET wrote, "The ThinkPad Yoga is a great work laptop that can be pressed into tablet duty when desired. Its heavy-duty ThinkPad construction will stand up to the rigors of a road warrior. The battery life is reasonable and the beautiful screen works well in both laptop and tablet modes."

The ThinkPad Yoga X1, (the first metal ThinkPad) has been given excellent reviews, with some review sites giving the new model a score of 4.5/5 stars.

== See also ==
- Ideapad Yoga
- ThinkPad X series
- ThinkPad L series
