= Intel Evo =

Laptops

Intel Evo powered by Core

Intel Evo, officially the Intel Evo Edition (For Intel Core Ultra or newer) and Intel Evo Platform, is a brand category of certified laptop computers, consisting of a number of guidelines to ensure good quality for consumers. Laptops with Intel processors can be certified under the Intel Evo badge if they pass the guidelines which include thin hardware designs, long-lasting battery life, fast charging, speedy wake up from sleep, and more.

The program originally started as Project Athena announced in 2019. Rather than using typical benchmarking, Athena aimed to focus on "Key Experience Indicators", or the use experience in real-world use. It was renamed to the more friendly name Intel Evo and launched in September 2020 (alongside Tiger Lake) with updated guidelines.

Evo has replaced Intel's earlier Ultrabook designation for thin premium performance laptops. The Evo certification consists of both Microsoft Windows and ChromeOS based devices (the latter of which includes "Chromebooks"). Many PC manufacturers have joined Intel's program, including Lenovo, HP, Dell and Asus.

== Adoption and Impact ==
Since its launch, Intel Evo has seen wide adoption across the premium laptop segment. Major manufacturers such as Lenovo, Dell, HP, Asus, Acer, and Samsung have released multiple Evo-certified models across their ultrabook and business-oriented product lines.

The platform has been positioned as a way to guarantee a consistent level of performance and user experience in thin and light devices. As a result, Evo-certified laptops are often marketed as ideal choices for mobile professionals, students, and content creators.

== Generational Updates ==
Each new generation of Intel Core processors brings updated Evo specifications. For example, with the launch of 12th Gen Alder Lake chips, Intel introduced Evo designs with hybrid architecture, improved multi-threading performance, and support for new connectivity standards such as Wi-Fi 6E.

As of 2024, the Evo platform continues to evolve in tandem with Intel's processor roadmap, incorporating newer AI capabilities, higher efficiency cores, and increasingly stringent power efficiency metrics.

== See also ==
- Centrino
- Viiv
- Ultrabook
- vPro
- Copilot+ PC

Preceded by Ultrabook	Intel Evo; 2020–present
