= Ultrabook =

High-end, lightweight laptop

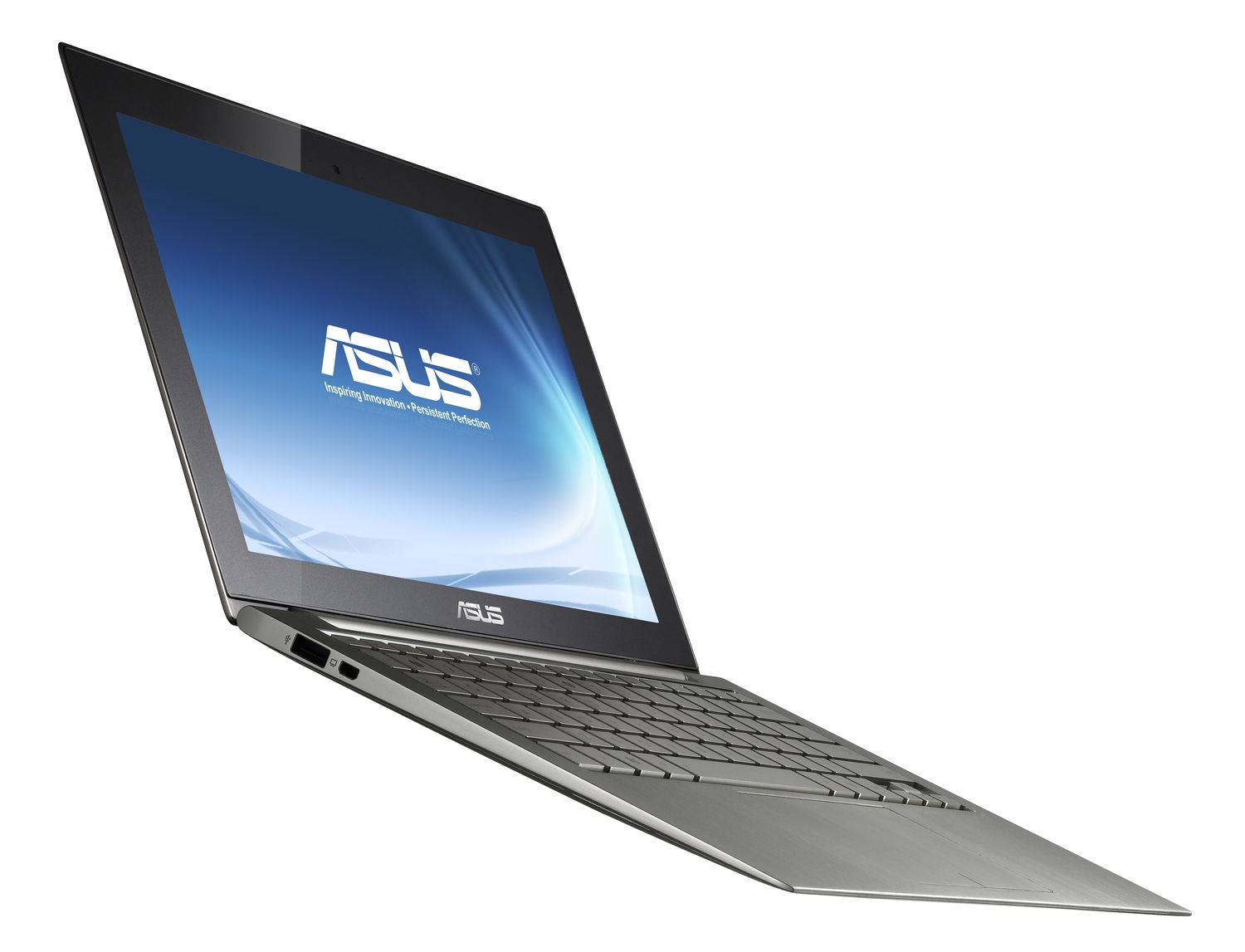
- Asus Zenbook UX21, an ultra thin laptop marketed as an Ultrabook
- Developer: Intel Corporation
- Type: Laptop platform
- Released: 2011
- Predecessor: Intel Centrino (2003-2010); Intel Common Building Block
- Successor: Intel Evo

Ultrabook is a class of premium consumer-grade notebook computers. The term was originated by and is trademarked by Intel, replacing the earlier Centrino mobile platform. Introduced in 2011, they were originally marketed as featuring ultra thin form factor and light weight design without compromising battery life or performance, running on Intel Core processors.

When newly introduced, Ultrabooks were generally small enough compared to average laptop models to qualify as subnotebooks. As ultrabook features became more mainstream in the mid-late 2010s, explicitly branding laptop models as "ultrabooks" became much less frequent. As of 2021, while Intel maintains the Ultrabook trademark, it is rarely used for new models and has been superseded in Intel's own marketing by the Intel Evo branding.

== History ==
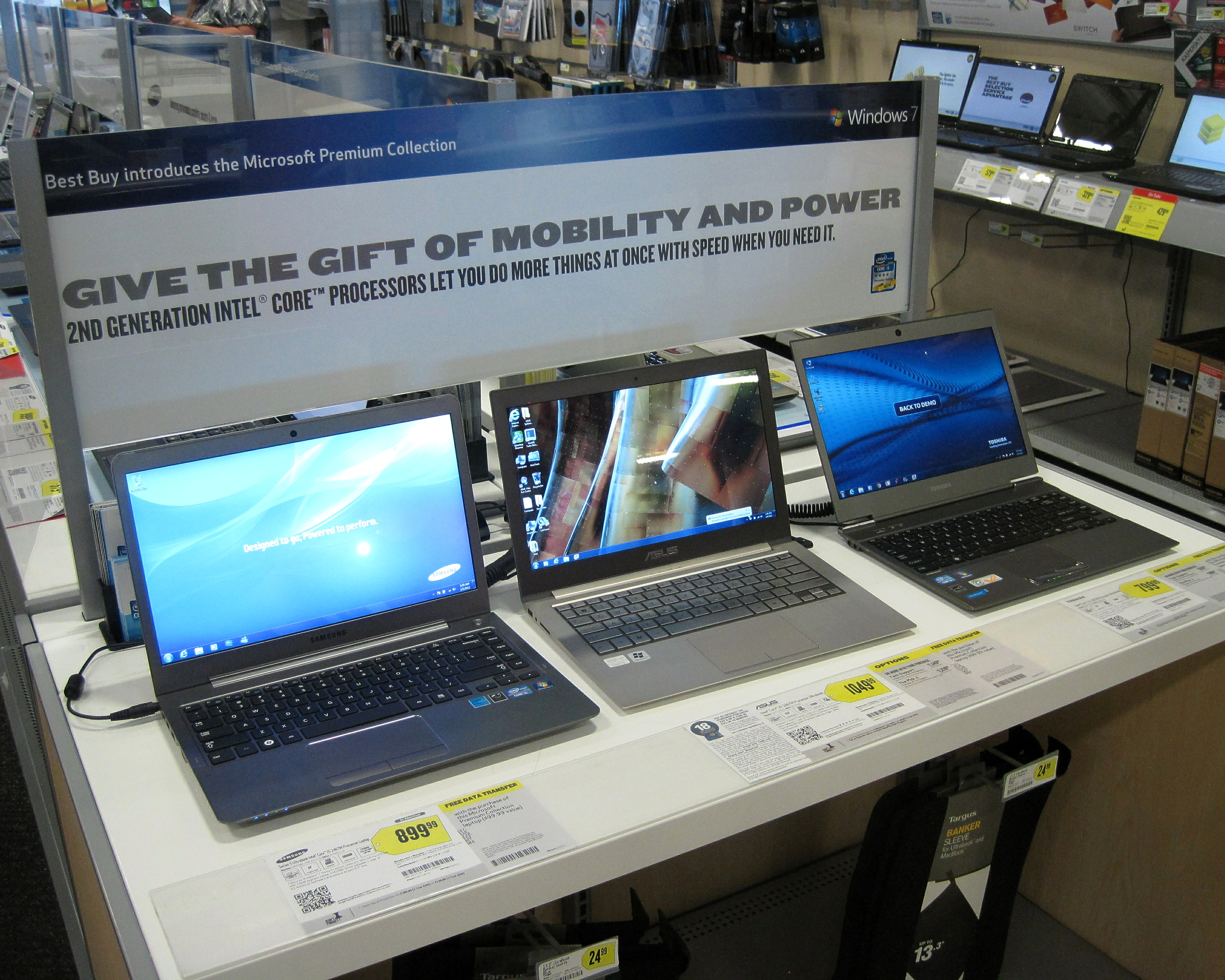
Three first-generation Ultrabooks on display in 2012. From left to right: Samsung Series 5 Notebook, Asus Zenbook UX21E, Toshiba Portégé Z830.

In 2011, Intel Capital press officer Jordan Balk Schaer announced a new fund to support startups working on technologies in line with the company's concept for next generation notebooks. The company set aside a $300 million fund to be spent over the next three to four years in areas related to Ultrabooks. Intel announced the Ultrabook concept at Computex in 2011. The Ultrabook would be a thin (less than 0.8 inches thick) notebook that utilized Intel processors, and would emphasize portability and a longer battery life than other laptops By this marketing initiative and the associated $300 million fund, Intel hoped to influence the slumping PC market against rising competition from smartphones and tablet computers, which are typically powered by competing ARM-based processors. Ultrabooks competed against other subnotebooks, including Apple’s MacBook Air, which has similar form specifications and was powered until 2020 by Intel CPUs, but was not advertised under the Ultrabook brand.

At the Intel Developer Forum in 2011, four Taiwan ODMs showed prototype Ultrabooks that used Intel's Ivy Bridge chips. Intel plans to reduce power consumption of its chips for Ultrabooks, like Ivy Bridge processors, which will feature 17 W default thermal design power.

At a presentation at the Consumer Electronics Show, an Intel manager stated that market analysis revealed that screen size motivated some of the reluctance to switch to 13" Ultrabooks. As a result, Intel planned to ensure, through cooperation with manufacturers, a 14 or 15-inch screen on 50% of the 75 Ultrabook models that would likely come to market in 2012.

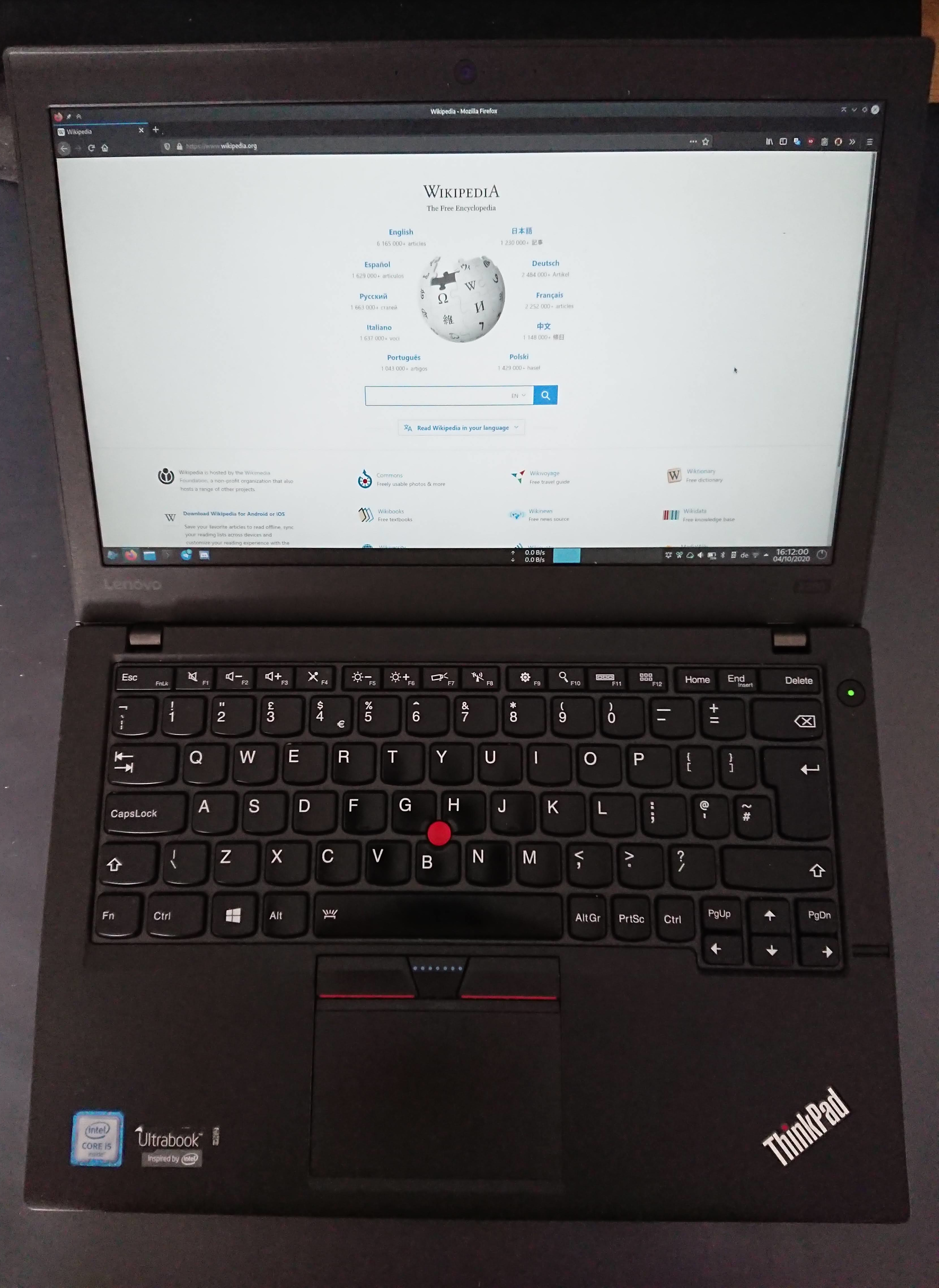
Lenovo ThinkPad X260, released in 2016, with Ultrabook branding

IHS iSuppli had originally forecast that 22 million Ultrabooks would be shipped by the end of 2012, and 61 million would be shipped in 2013. By October 2012, IHS had revised its projections down significantly, to 10 million units sold in 2012 and 44 million for 2013. Most Ultrabooks were too expensive for wide adoption. In addition Intel's constant changing of Ultrabook specifications caused confusion among consumers; and this was compounded by OEMs that released slim/"sleek" or "Sleekbook" laptops (e.g. Hewlett-Packard Pavilion TouchSmart 15z-b000 Sleekbook, Samsung Ativ Book 9 Lite) that are cheaper AMD-powered variants of their more expensive Intel-equipped Ultrabooks. Overall there was a shift in the market away from PCs as a whole (including Ultrabooks) and towards smartphones and tablet computers as the personal computing devices of choice.

Intel banked on the release of Windows 8 as well as new form factors, such as "convertible" laptops with touchscreens and tablets with keyboard docks ("detachable"), and features (accelerometers and gyroscopes for touchscreens, hand-gesture recognition) to build demand for Ultrabooks. With the third generation Ultrabook specification, introduced in June 2013 alongside its new Haswell processor architecture, Intel also added the requirement for all future Ultrabooks to include touchscreens. The requirement, grounded in user experience research, was intended to prevent "game-playing" and market confusion from OEMs, who had offered low-end products with touchscreens but not Ultrabooks.

== Specifications ==
Intel required that OEMs meet certain specifications to market a laptop as an Ultrabook. These requirements changed with each release of Intel's Centrino mobile platform.

Ultrabook specifications
Platform	Huron River	Chief River	Shark Bay
Release date	October 2011	June 2012	June 2013
Processor	Sandy Bridge microarchitecture Intel Core models CULV (17 W TDP)	Ivy Bridge microarchitecture Intel Core models CULV (17 W TDP)	Haswell microarchitecture SiP (11.5 or 15 W TDP)
Height (maximum)	18 mm for 13.3" and smaller displays 21 mm for 14.0" and larger displays	18 mm for 13.3" and smaller displays 21 mm for 14.0" and larger displays 23 mm for convertible tablets	20 mm for 13.3" and smaller displays 23 mm for 14.0" and larger displays
Battery life (minimum)	5 hours	5 hours	6 hours HD video playback 9 hours Windows 8 idle
Resume from hibernation (maximum)	7 seconds	7 seconds	3 seconds
Storage	no requirements	80 MB/s transfer rate (minimum)	80 MB/s transfer rate (minimum)
I/O	no requirements	USB 3.0 or Thunderbolt	Intel Wireless Display touchscreen voice command sensors/context aware (convertibles only)
Software and firmware	Intel Management Engine 7.1 (or higher); Intel Anti-Theft Technology; Intel Identity Protection Technology	Intel Management Engine 8.0 (or higher); Intel Anti-Theft Technology; Intel Identity Protection Technology	Anti-virus, anti-malware Intel Anti-Theft Technology; Intel Identity Protection Technology

== List of models ==
Preceded by Centrino	Ultrabook; 2011–2020	Succeeded by Intel Evo
