= List of IOMMU-supporting hardware =

This article contains a list of virtualization-capable IOMMU-supporting hardware.

== Intel based ==
List of Intel and Intel-based hardware that supports VT-d (Intel Virtualization Technology for Directed I/O).

=== CPUs ===
==== Server ====
The vast majority of Intel server chips of the Xeon E3, Xeon E5, and Xeon E7 product lines support VT-d.

The first—and least powerful—Xeon to support VT-d was the E5502 launched Q1'09 with two cores at 1.86 GHz on a 45 nm process. Many or most Xeons subsequent to this support VT-d.

See Advanced Search: feature=VT-d and segment=server for the full list.

==== Desktop ====
CPU	Microarch- itecture	Cores/ threads	Clock speed (base/turbo)	Cache	Litho- graphy	Max. TDP	Integrated Graphics	Max. memory size	EPT	Works on		
CPU	Microarch- itecture	Cores/ threads	Clock speed (base/turbo)	Cache	Litho- graphy	Max. TDP	Integrated Graphics	Max. memory size	EPT	QEMU-KVM	Xen	VMware ESXi
Core2 Quad Q9400 (Note: No longer supported. Not supported by Windows 11. No SSE4.2. No AVX at all. No AMX. No XDNA. UHD Blu-ray playback not supported.)	Yorkfield	4 / 4	2.66 GHz	6 MB L2	45 nm	95 W	No (Note: Lacks hardware video codec.)	Unknown	No	Unknown	Unknown	Unknown
Core2 Quad CPU Q9650	Yorkfield	4 / 4	3.0 GHz	12 MB L2	45 nm	95 W	No	Unknown	No	Unknown	Unknown	Unknown
Core2 Duo E8500	Penryn	2 / 2	3.17 GHz	6 MB	45 nm	65 W	No	16 GB	No	Unknown	Unknown	Unknown
Core i7 860 (Note: No longer supported. Not supported by Windows 11. No AVX at all. No AMX. No XDNA. UHD Blu-ray playback not supported.)	Nehalem	4 / 8	2.80 / 3.46 GHz	8 MB	45 nm	95 W	No	16 GB	Yes	1.0.1	Unknown	Unknown
Core i7 870	Nehalem	4 / 8	2.93 / 3.60 GHz	8 MB	45 nm	95 W	No	16 GB	Yes	Unknown	Unknown	Unknown
Core i7 920 XM	Nehalem	4 / 8	2.66 / 2.93 GHz	8 MB	45 nm	130 W	No	24 GB	Yes	1.0.1	Unknown	Unknown
Core i7 920	Nehalem	4 / 8	2.67 GHz	8 MB	45 nm	130 W	No	24 GB	Yes	1.0.1	Unknown	Unknown
Core i3 2115C (Note: No longer supported. Not supported by Windows 11. No AVX2. No AVX-512. No AMX. No XDNA. UHD Blu-ray playback not supported.)	Sandy Bridge	2 / 4	2 GHz	3 MB	32 nm	25 W	No	32 GB	Yes	Unknown	Unknown	Unknown
Core i5 2400	Sandy Bridge	4 / 4	3.1 / 3.4 GHz	6 MB	32 nm	95 W	HD Graphics 2000 (Note: Lacks MPEG-1, H.262 and VC-1 hardware encoders, and JPEG, H.263, H.265, H.266, AVS1, AVS+, AVS2, AVS3, VP8, VP9 and AV1 hardware codecs.) (Note: Lacks HDCP 2.3.)	32 GB	Yes	1.0.1	Unknown	5
Core i5 2400S	Sandy Bridge	4 / 4	2.5 / 3.3 GHz	6 MB	32 nm	65 W	HD Graphics 2000}	32 GB	Yes	Unknown	Unknown	Unknown
Core i5 2500	Sandy Bridge	4 / 4	3.3 / 3.7 GHz	6 MB	32 nm	95 W	HD Graphics 2000	32 GB	Yes	Unknown	Unknown	5.5
Core i5 2500S	Sandy Bridge	4 / 4	2.7 / 3.7 GHz	6 MB	32 nm	65 W	HD Graphics 2000	32 GB	Yes	Unknown	Unknown	Unknown
Core i5 2500T	Sandy Bridge	4 / 4	2.3 / 3.3 GHz	6 MB	32 nm	45 W	HD Graphics 2000	32 GB	Yes	Unknown	Unknown	Unknown
Core i7 2600	Sandy Bridge	4 / 8	3.4 / 3.8 GHz	8 MB	32 nm	95 W	HD Graphics 2000	32 GB	Yes	1.0.1	Unknown	4.1 5
Core i7 2600S	Sandy Bridge	4 / 8	2.8 / 3.8 GHz	8 MB	32 nm	65 W	HD Graphics 2000	32 GB	Yes	Unknown	Unknown	Unknown
Core i5 3470	Ivy Bridge	4 / 4	3.2 / 3.6 GHz	6 MB	22 nm	77 W	HD Graphics 2500 (Note: Lacks MPEG-1 and VC-1 hardware encoders and JPEG, H.263, H.265, H.266, AVS1, AVS+, AVS2, AVS3, VP8, VP9 and AV1 hardware codecs.)	32 GB	Yes	Unknown	Unknown	Unknown
Core i5 3470S	Ivy Bridge	4 / 4	2.9 / 3.6 GHz	6 MB	22 nm	65 W	HD Graphics 2500	32 GB	Yes	Unknown	Unknown	Unknown
Core i5 3470T	Ivy Bridge	2 / 4	2.9 / 3.6 GHz	6 MB	22 nm	35 W	HD Graphics 2500	32 GB	Yes	Unknown	Unknown	Unknown
Core i5 3475S	Ivy Bridge	4 / 4	2.9 / 3.6 GHz	6 MB	22 nm	65 W	HD Graphics 4000	32 GB	Yes	Unknown	Unknown	Unknown
Core i5 3550	Ivy Bridge	4 / 4	3.3 / 3.7 GHz	6 MB	22 nm	77 W	HD Graphics 2500	32 GB	Yes	Unknown	Unknown	Unknown
Core i5 3550S	Ivy Bridge	4 / 4	3 / 3.7 GHz	6 MB	22 nm	65 W	HD Graphics 2500	32 GB	Yes	Unknown	Unknown	Unknown
Core i5 3570	Ivy Bridge	4 / 4	3.4 / 3.8 GHz	6 MB	22 nm	77 W	HD Graphics 2500	32 GB	Yes	Unknown	Unknown	Unknown
Core i5 3570S	Ivy Bridge	4 / 4	3.1 / 3.8 GHz	6 MB	22 nm	65 W	HD Graphics 2500	32 GB	Yes	Unknown	Unknown	Unknown
Core i5 3570T	Ivy Bridge	4 / 4	2.3 / 3.3 GHz	6 MB	22 nm	45 W	HD Graphics 2500	32 GB	Yes	Unknown	Unknown	Unknown
Core i7 3770	Ivy Bridge	4 / 8	3.4 / 3.9 GHz	8 MB	22 nm	77 W	HD Graphics 4000	32 GB	Yes	2.5.0	Unknown	6.5
Core i7 3770S	Ivy Bridge	4 / 8	3.1 / 3.9 GHz	8 MB	22 nm	65 W	HD Graphics 4000	32 GB	Yes	Yes	Unknown	5.1
Core i7 3770T	Ivy Bridge	4 / 8	2.5 / 3.7 GHz	8 MB	22 nm	45 W	HD Graphics 4000	32 GB	Yes	Unknown	Unknown	Unknown
Core i7 3820	Sandy Bridge	4 / 8	3.6 / 3.8 GHz	10 MB	32 nm	130 W	No	64 GB	Yes	1.0.1	Unknown	Unknown
Core i7 3930K	Sandy Bridge	6 / 12	3.2 / 3.8 GHz	12 MB	32 nm	130 W	No	64 GB	Yes	Unknown	4.1.2 and 4.3*	Unknown
Core i7 3960X	Sandy Bridge	6 / 12	3.3 / 3.9 GHz	15 MB	32 nm	130 W	No	64 GB	Yes	Unknown	Unknown	Unknown
Core i5 4460 (Note: No longer supported. Not supported by Windows 11. No AVX-512. No AMX. No XDNA. UHD Blu-ray playback not supported.)	Haswell	4 / 4	3.2 / 3.4 GHz	6 MB	22 nm	84 W	HD Graphics 4600 (Note: Lacks MPEG-1, VC-1 and H.265 hardware encoders, and H.263, H.266, AVS1, AVS+, AVS2, AVS3, VP8, VP9 and AV1 hardware codecs.)	32 GB	Yes	Unknown	Unknown	Unknown
Core i5 4570	Haswell	4 / 4	3.2 / 3.6 GHz	6 MB	22 nm	84 W	HD Graphics 4600	32 GB	Yes	Yes	Unknown	5.5
Core i5 4590	Haswell	4 / 4	3.3 / 3.7 GHz	6 MB	22 nm	84 W	HD Graphics 4600	32 GB	Yes	Yes	Unknown	Unknown
Core i5 4670	Haswell	4 / 4	3.4 / 3.8 GHz	6 MB	22 nm	84 W	HD Graphics 4600	32 GB	Yes	Unknown	Unknown	Unknown
Core i5 4690	Devil's Canyon	4 / 4	3.5 / 3.9 GHz	6 MB	22 nm	88 W	HD Graphics 4600	32 GB	Yes	Unknown	Unknown	Unknown
Core i5 4690K	Devil's Canyon	4 / 4	3.5 / 3.9 GHz	6 MB	22 nm	88 W	HD Graphics 4600	32 GB	Yes	Yes	Unknown	Unknown
Core i5 4690S	Devil's Canyon	4 / 4	3.2 / 3.9 GHz	6 MB	22 nm	65 W	HD Graphics 4600	32 GB	Yes	Unknown	Unknown	Unknown
Core i7 4765T	Haswell	4 / 8	3.4 / 3.9 GHz	8 MB	22 nm	84 W	HD Graphics 4600	32 GB	Yes	Unknown	Unknown	Unknown
Core i7 4770	Haswell	4 / 8	3.4 / 3.9 GHz	8 MB	22 nm	84 W	HD Graphics 4600	32 GB	Yes	2.5.1	Unknown	5.5
Core i7 4770R	Haswell	4 / 8	3.2 / 3.9 GHz	6 MB	22 nm	65 W	Iris Pro Graphics 5200	32 GB	Yes	Unknown	Unknown	Unknown
Core i7 4770S	Haswell	4 / 8	3.1 / 3.9 GHz	8 MB	22 nm	65 W	HD Graphics 4600	32 GB	Yes	Unknown	Unknown	Unknown
Core i7 4770T	Haswell	4 / 8	2.5 / 3.7 GHz	8 MB	22 nm	45 W	HD Graphics 4600	32 GB	Yes	Unknown	Unknown	Unknown
Core i7 4771	Haswell	4 / 8	3.5 / 3.9 GHz	8 MB	22 nm	84 W	HD Graphics 4600	32 GB	Yes	Unknown	Unknown	Unknown
Core i7 4790	Devil's Canyon	4 / 8	3,6 / 4.0 GHz	8 MB	22 nm	84 W	HD Graphics 4600	32 GB	Yes	2.1.0	4.2.4	Unknown
Core i7 4790S	Devil's Canyon	4 / 8	3.2 / 4.0 GHz	8 MB	22 nm	65 W	HD Graphics 4600	32 GB	Yes	Unknown	Unknown	Unknown
Core i7 4790K	Devil's Canyon	4 / 8	4.0 / 4.4 GHz	8 MB	22 nm	88 W	HD Graphics 4600	32 GB	Yes	Yes	Yes	Yes
Core i7 4820K	Ivy Bridge-E	4 / 8	3.7 / 3.9 GHz	10 MB	22 nm	130 W	No	64 GB	Yes	2.11.1	Unknown	Unknown
Core i7 4960X	Ivy Bridge	6 / 12	4.0 GHz	15 MB	22 nm	130 W	No	64 GB	Unknown	Unknown	Unknown	Unknown
Core i5 5200U	Broadwell	2 / 4	2.2 / 2.7 GHz	3 MB	14 nm	15 W	HD Graphics 5500 (Note: Lacks MPEG-1, VC-1, H.265, VP8 and VP9 hardware encoders, and H.263, H.266, AVS1, AVS+, AVS2, AVS3, and AV1 hardware codecs.)	16 GB	Yes	Unknown	Unknown	Unknown
Core i7 5500U	Broadwell	2 / 4	2.4 / 3.0 GHz	16 MB	14 nm	7.5 W	HD Graphics 5500	16 GB	Yes	2.1.0	4.2.4	4.4.0
Core i7 5820K	Haswell	6 / 12	3.3 / 3.6 GHz	15 MB	22 nm	140 W	No	64 GB	Yes	2.5.0	Unknown	Unknown
Core i7 5930K	Haswell	6 / 12	3.5 / 3.7 GHz	15 MB	22 nm	140 W	No	64 GB	Yes	Unknown	Unknown	Unknown
Core i7 5960X	Haswell	8 / 16	3.0 / 3.5 GHz	20 MB	22 nm	140 W	No	64 GB	Yes	Unknown	Unknown	Unknown
Core i5 6500T (Note: Not supported by Windows 11. Legacy support for the iGPU. No AVX-512. No AMX. No XDNA. UHD Blu-ray playback not supported.)	Skylake	4 / 4	2.5 / 3.1 GHz	6 MB	14 nm	35 W	HD Graphics 530 (Note: Lacks MPEG-1, VC-1 and VP9 hardware encoders, and H.263, H.266, AVS1, AVS+, AVS2, AVS3, and AV1 hardware codecs.)	64 GB	Yes	Yes	Unknown	Unknown
Core i5 6600K	Skylake	4 / 4	3.5 / 3.9 GHz	6 MB	14 nm	91 W	HD Graphics 530	64 GB	Yes	Unknown	Unknown	Unknown
Core i7 6700K	Skylake	4 / 8	4.0 / 4.2 GHz	8 MB	14 nm	91 W	HD Graphics 530	64 GB	Yes	Unknown	Unknown	Unknown
Core i7 6800K	Broadwell-E	6 / 12	3.4 / 3.8 GHz	15 MB	14 nm	140 W	No	128 GB	Yes	Yes	Unknown	Unknown
Core i3 7100U (Note: Not supported by Windows 11. Legacy support for the iGPU. No AVX-512. No AMX. No XDNA.)	Kaby Lake	2 / 4	2.4 GHz	3 MB	14 nm	15 W	HD Graphics 620 (Note: Lacks MPEG-1 and VC-1 hardware encoders and H.263, H.266, AVS1, AVS+, AVS2, AVS3, and AV1 hardware codecs.)	32 GB	Yes	Unknown	Unknown	Unknown
Core i5 7600K	Kaby Lake	4 / 4	3.8 / 4.2 GHz	6 MB	14 nm	91 W	HD Graphics 630	64 GB	Yes	Unknown	Unknown	Unknown
Core i7 7700K	Kaby Lake	4 / 8	4.2 / 4.5 GHz	8 MB	14 nm	91 W	HD Graphics 630	64 GB	Yes	Unknown	Unknown	Unknown
Core i3 8100 (Note: Legacy support for the iGPU. No AVX-512. No AMX. No XDNA.)	Coffee Lake	4 / 4	3.6 / 3.6 GHz	6 MB	14 nm	65 W	UHD Graphics 630	64 GB	Yes	Yes	Unknown	Unknown
Core i7 8700K	Coffee Lake	6 / 12	3.7 / 4.7 GHz	12 MB	14 nm	95 W	UHD Graphics 630	64 GB	Yes	2.10.1-1	Unknown	Unknown
Core i7 8750H	Coffee Lake	6 / 12	2.2 / 4.1 GHz	9 MB	14 nm	45 W	UHD Graphics 630	64 GB	Yes	Yes	No	Yes
Core i7 8086K	Coffee Lake	6 / 12	4.0 / 5.0 GHz	12 MB	14 nm	95 W	UHD Graphics 630	128 GB	Yes	Unknown	Unknown	Unknown
Core i7 8700	Coffee Lake	6 / 12	3.2 / 4.6 GHz	12 MB	14 nm	65 W	UHD Graphics 630	64 GB	Yes	Unknown	Unknown	Unknown
Core i3 9100	Coffee Lake	4 / 4	3.6 / 4.2 GHz	6 MB	14 nm	65 W	UHD Graphics 630	64 GB	Yes	Unknown	Unknown	Unknown
Core i7 9750H	Coffee Lake	6 / 12	2.6 / 4.5 GHz	12 MB	14 nm	45 W	UHD Graphics 630	64 GB	Yes	Unknown	Yes	Unknown
Core i7 9850HK ES (QQLT)	Coffee Lake	6 / 12	2.4 / 4.1 GHz	12 MB	14 nm	45 W	UHD Graphics 630	64 GB	Yes	Yes	Yes	Yes
CPU	Microarch- itecture	Cores/ threads	Clock speed (base/turbo)	Cache	Litho- graphy	Max. TDP	Integrated graphics	Max. memory size	EPT	Works on		
CPU	Microarch- itecture	Cores/ threads	Clock speed (base/turbo)	Cache	Litho- graphy	Max. TDP	Integrated graphics	Max. memory size	EPT	QEMU-KVM	Xen	VMware ESXi

- VT-d on i7 3930K and i7 3960X only works on C2 stepping.

=== Motherboards ===
==== Intel ====
Board	Chipset	Memory			NIC	SATA Ports	PCI	PCIe					Works on		
Board	Chipset	Max. (GB)	Slots	Type	NIC	SATA Ports	PCI	mini	×1	×4	×8	×16	QEMU-KVM	Xen	VMware ESXi
DX58SO (Note: Not supported by Windows 11.)	X58	16	4	DDR3	1× Gigabit	6×2.0	2	No	2×2.0	1×2.0	No	2×2.0	1.0.1	Unknown	Unknown
DQ67SW	Q67	32	4	DDR3	1× Gigabit	2×3.0 2×2.0	2	No	1×2.0	1×2.0	No	1×2.0	1.0.1	Unknown	5
Board	Chipset	Memory			NIC	SATA Ports	PCI	PCIe					Works on		
Board	Chipset	Max. (GB)	Slots	Type	NIC	SATA Ports	PCI	mini	×1	×4	×8	×16	QEMU-KVM	Xen	VMware ESXi

==== Gigabyte ====
Board	Chipset	Memory			NIC	SATA Ports	PCI	PCIe					Works on		
Board	Chipset	Max. (GB)	Slots	Type	NIC	SATA Ports	PCI	mini	×1	×4	×8	×16	QEMU-KVM	Xen	VMware ESXi
P55M-UD4 (Note: Not supported by Windows 11.)	P55	16	4	DDR3	1× Gigabit	8×2.0	1	No	No	1	1	1	1.2.5	Unknown	Unknown
Z77P-D3	Z77	32	4	DDR3	1× Gigabit	2×3.0	2	Yes	1	1	No	1	2.5.0	Unknown	Unknown
Z87X-HD3	Z87	32	4	DDR3	1× Gigabit	6×3.0	2	Unknown	3	No	1	1	1.2.5	Unknown	Unknown
Z97-UD5H	Z97	32	4	DDR3	2× Gigabit	8×3.0	2	No	2	1	1	1	2.4.0	Unknown	Unknown
Z97X-UD3H-CF	Z97	32	4	DDR3	1x Gigabit	7x3.0	1		2	1	1 (ACS patch needed if used)	1	5.0.0.7	Unknown	Unknown
Z490M	Z490	128	4	DDR4	1x Gigabit	6x3.0	0	0	1	1	0	1	4.2.1	Unknown	Unknown
Board	Chipset	Memory			NIC	SATA Ports	PCI	PCIe					Works on		
Board	Chipset	Max. (GB)	Slots	Type	NIC	SATA Ports	PCI	mini	×1	×4	×8	×16	QEMU-KVM	Xen	VMware ESXi

==== ASRock ====
Board	Chipset	Memory			NIC	SATA Ports	PCI	PCIe					Works on		
Board	Chipset	Max. (GB)	Slots	Type	NIC	SATA Ports	PCI	mini	×1	×4	×8	×16	QEMU-KVM	Xen	VMware ESXi
Z68 Extreme4 (Note: Not supported by Windows 11.)	Z68	32	4	DDR3	1× Gigabit	4×3.0 4×2.0	2	No	2×2.0	1×2.0	1×2.0	1×2.0	Unknown	Unknown	4.1
Z68 Professional Gen3	Z68	32	4	DDR3	2× Gigabit	4×3.0 4×2.0	2	No	2×2.0	1×3.0	1×3.0	1×3.0	Unknown	Unknown	4.1
H77M	H77	16	2	DDR3	1× Gigabit	2×3.0 4×2.0	2	No	No	1×2.0	No	1×3.0	Yes	Unknown	Unknown
Z77 Pro3	Z77	32	4	DDR3	1× Gigabit	2×3.0 4×2.0	2	No	1×2.0	1×2.0	No	1×3.0	Unknown	Unknown	5
Z77 Extreme6	Z77	32	4	DDR3	1× Gigabit	4×3.0 4×2.0	2	1×2.0	1×2.0	1×2.0	1×3.0	1×3.0	1.0.1	Unknown	5
B85M Pro4	B85	32	4	DDR3	1× Gigabit	4×3.0 4×2.0	2	No	No	No	No	2×3.0	Yes	Unknown	Unknown
Z87 Extreme6	Z87	32	4	DDR3	2× Gigabit	10×3.0	2	1×2.0	1×2.0	No	No	3×3.0	2.0.1	4.2.4	Unknown
Z97 Extreme4	Z97	32	4	DDR3	1× Gigabit	8×3.0	0	Unknown	3×2.0	No	No	3×3.0	Yes	Unknown	Unknown
z170 extreme4	Z170	64	4	DDR4	1× Gigabit	6×3.0	0	No	3×2.0	1×3.0	1×3.0	1×3.0	Yes	Unknown	Unknown
Z370M-ITX/ac	Z370	32	2	DDR4	2× Gigabit	6×3.0	0	No	No	No	No	1×3.0	2.10.1-1	Unknown	Unknown
Board	Chipset	Memory			NIC	SATA Ports	PCI	PCIe					Works on		
Board	Chipset	Max. (GB)	Slots	Type	NIC	SATA Ports	PCI	mini	×1	×4	×8	×16	QEMU-KVM	Xen	VMware ESXi

==== Asus ====
Board	Chipset	Memory			NIC	SATA Ports	PCI	PCIe					Works on		
Board	Chipset	Max. (GB)	Slots	Type	NIC	SATA Ports	PCI	mini	×1	×4	×8	×16	QEMU-KVM	Xen	VMware ESXi
Z8NA-D6 (Note: Not supported by Windows 11.)	5500 (X58)	24/48	6	DDR3	2x Gigabit	6x2.0	1	No	No	No	2x2.0 (x4 Link)	1x2.0	Yes	Unknown	Unknown
P6T6 WS Revolution	X58	24/48 (1)	6	DDR3	2× Gigabit	6×2.0	0	Unknown	No	No	No	6×2.0	No	No	Unknown
P8H77-V	H77	32	4	DDR3	1× Gigabit	2×3.0 4x2.0	0	No	2			2×3.0/2.0 *link for more info	Yes	Unknown	Unknown
P8Z77-V LK	Z77	32	4	DDR3	1× Gigabit	2×3.0 4x2.0	2	No	2×2.0	1x2.0	1x3.0/2.0	1x2.0/2.0	Yes	Unknown	Unknown
B85M-G	B85	32	4	DDR3	1× Gigabit	4×3.0 2x2.0	0	No	2x2.0	No	No	1x3.0/2.0	Yes	Unknown	Unknown
Gryphon z97	Z97	32	4	DDR3	1 x Gigabit	2x3.0 1x2.0	4	No		1		2×3.0/2.0	Yes	Unknown	Unknown
Sabertooth Z97 Mark1	Z97	32	4	DDR3	2× Gigabit	8×3.0	0	No	3			2×3.0/2.0 *link for more info	ACS override patch required	Unknown	Unknown
Maximus VII Ranger	Z97	32	4	DDR3	1× Gigabit	6×3.0	0	1x2 2.0 M.2 shared PCH	3x2.0 2x shared PCH	1x2.0 shared PCH	1×3.0/2.0 shared CPU	1×3.0/2.0 shared CPU	Yes	Unknown	Unknown
Board	Chipset	Memory			NIC	SATA<uvubr />Ports	PCI	PCIe					Works on		
Board	Chipset	Max. (GB)	Slots	Type	NIC	SATA<uvubr />Ports	PCI	mini	×1	×4	×8	×16	QEMU-KVM	Xen	VMware ESXi

(1) 48 GB with CPU as xeon x5680 and 8GB DIMMs

==== MSI ====
Board	Chipset	Memory			NIC	SATA Ports	PCI	PCIe					Works on		
Board	Chipset	Max. (GB)	Slots	Type	NIC	SATA Ports	PCI	mini	×1	×4	×8	×16	QEMU-KVM	Xen	VMware ESXi
Z68A-GD80 (B3) (Note: Not supported by Windows 11.)	Z68	32	4	DDR3	2× Gigabit	4×3.0 4×2.0	2	No	2×2.0	1×2.0	No	1×2.0	Unknown	Unknown	4.1
X99A XPOWER GAMING TITANIUM	X99A	128	8	DDR4	1× Gigabit	10×3.0	No	No	1×2.0	No	No	5×3.0	Yes	Unknown	Unknown
B150M PRO-VD (MS-7996)	B150	32	2	DDR4	1× Gigabit	6×3.0	No	No	2×3.0	No	No	1×3.0	Yes	Unknown	Unknown
Z170A SLI PLUS	Z170	64	4	DDR4	1× Gigabit	6×3.0	No	No	3×3.0	No	No	3×3.0	Yes	Unknown	Unknown
X299 Pro	X299	256	8	DDR4	1xGigabit 1x2.5Gigabit	6x3.0	4	No			2x3.0	2x3.0	Yes	Unknown	Unknown
Board	Chipset	Memory			NIC	SATA Ports	PCI	PCIe					Works on		
Board	Chipset	Max. (GB)	Slots	Type	NIC	SATA Ports	PCI	mini	×1	×4	×8	×16	QEMU-KVM	Xen	VMware ESXi

=== Chipset ===
- Intel Z490 (Note: VT-d is inherently supported on these chipsets, but may not be enabled by individual OEMs. Always read the motherboard manual and check for BIOS updates.)
- Intel Z370
- Intel Z170
- Intel X99
- Intel X79
- Intel Q170
- Intel Q150
- Intel Q87
- Intel Q77
- Intel Q67
- Intel Q45
- Intel P55
- Intel Q35, X38, X48 Q45
- Intel HM87, QM87, HM86, C222, X99, C612, C226

== AMD based ==
List of AMD and AMD-based hardware that supports IOMMU. AMD's implementation of IOMMU is also known as AMD-Vi. Please note that just because a motherboard uses a chipset that supports IOMMU does not mean it is able to and the bios must have an ACPI IVRS table to enable the use of it. At least one Asus board is known to have faulty BIOSes with corrupt ACPI IVRS tables; for such cases, under Linux, it is possible to specify custom mappings to override the faulty and/or missing BIOS-provided ones through the use of the ivrs_ioapic and ivrs_hpet kernel parameters.

=== CPUs ===
List of AMD-Vi and AMD-RVI capable AMD CPUs. All Ryzen processors so far (1xxx-7xxx) support it.

Codename	CPUID Family	CPU/APU Brand Name
Trinity	15h	AMD A-Series Series of Products (2nd Generation)
Zambezi	15h	AMD FX Series of Products
Llano	12h	AMD A-Series Series of Products
Sargas	10h	AMD Athlon II Series of Products
Champlain	10h	AMD Athlon II Dual-Core Mobile Series of Products
Geneva	0Fh	AMD Athlon II Neo Series of Products
Geneva	0Fh	AMD Athlon II Neo Dual-Core Mobile Series of Products
Geneva	0Fh	AMD Athlon II Neo Mobile Series of Products
Regor	10h	AMD Athlon II X2 Series of Products
Rana	10h	AMD Athlon II X3 Series of Products
Propus	10h	AMD Athlon II X4 Series of Products
Propus	10h	AMD Athlon II XLT Series of Products
Kuma	10h	AMD Athlon X2 Series of Products
Ontario	14h	AMD C-Series Series of Products
Zacate	14h	AMD E-Series Series of Products
Zacate	14h	AMD G-Series Series of Products
Zacate	14h	AMD G-Series Series of Products
Zacate	14h	AMD Phenom II Dual-Core Mobile Series of Products
Zacate	14h	AMD Phenom II Quad-Core Mobile Series of Products
Zacate	14h	AMD Phenom II Triple-Core Mobile Series of Products
Callisto	10h	AMD Phenom II X2 Series of Products
Heka	10h	AMD Phenom II X3 Series of Products
Deneb	10h	AMD Phenom II X4 Series of Products
Zosma	10h	AMD Phenom II X4 Series of Products
Thuban	10h	AMD Phenom II X6 Series of Products
Thuban	10h	AMD Phenom II XLT Series of Products
Toliman	10h	AMD Phenom X3 Series of Products
Agena	10h	AMD Phenom X4 Series of Products
Sargas	10h	AMD Sempron Series of Products
Caspian	10h	AMD Sempron Mobile Series of Products
Regor	10h	AMD Sempron X2 Series of Products
Istanbul	10h	AMD Six-Core Opteron Series of Products
Barcelona	10h	AMD Third Generation Opteron Series of Products
Budapest	10h	AMD Third Generation Opteron Series of Products
Shanghai	10h	AMD Third Generation Opteron Series of Products
Suzuka	10h	AMD Third Generation Opteron Series of Products
Caspian	10h	AMD Turion II Dual-Core Mobile Series of Products
Geneva	10h	AMD Turion II Neo Series of Products
Geneva	10h	AMD Turion II Neo Dual-Core Mobile Series of Products
Champlain	10h	AMD V Series for Notebook PCs Series of Products
Geneva	10h	AMD V Series for Notebook PCs Series of Products

==== Desktop ====
CPU	Microarchitecture	Cores/threads	Clock (base/max.)	Cache L2 / L3	Lithography	TDP	IGP	Max. memory size	RVI	Works on		
CPU	Microarchitecture	Cores/threads	Clock (base/max.)	Cache L2 / L3	Lithography	TDP	IGP	Max. memory size	RVI	QEMU-KVM	Xen	VMware ESXi
AMD Phenom II X6 1055T (Note: Not supported by Windows 11. No SSE4.x. No AVX at all. No AMX. No XDNA. UHD Blu-ray playback not supported.)	AMD K10	6 / 6	2.8 / 3.3 GHz	3 / 6 MB	45 nm	125 W	No (Note: Lacks hardware video codec.)	64 GB	Yes	Yes	Unknown	Unknown
AMD Phenom II X6 1090T	AMD K10	6 / 6	3.2 / 3.6 GHz	3 / 6 MB	45 nm	125 W	No	64 GB	Yes	Yes	Unknown	Unknown
AMD FX (Note: Not supported by Windows 11. No AVX2. No AVX-512. No AMX. No XDNA. UHD Blu-ray playback not supported.)	Bulldozer	8 / 8			32 nm	220 W	No	64 GB	Yes	Yes	Yes	Unknown
AMD A Series (Note: Not supported by Windows 11. iGPU no longer supported. No AVX-512. No AMX. No XDNA. UHD Blu-ray playback not supported.)	Piledriver						Yes (Note: Lacks JPEG, MPEG-1, and H.265 hardware encoders, and AVS1, AVS+, AVS2, AVS3, VP8, VP9, AV1, and H.266 hardware codecs.) (Note: Lacks HDCP 2.2 and higher.)		Yes	Yes	Yes	6.0, 6.5
AMD Ryzen 7 2700x (Note: No AVX-512. No AMX. No XDNA. UHD Blu-ray playback not supported.)	Zen+	8 / 16	3.7 / 4.3 GHz	16 MB	12 nm	105 W	No	128 GB	Yes	Yes	Unknown	Yes
AMD Ryzen 9 3900x	Zen 2	12/24	3.8/4.5 GHz	6/64 MB	7 nm	105 W	No	128 GB	Yes	Yes	Unknown	Unknown
AMD Ryzen 5 5600x	Zen 3	6/12	3.7/4.6 GHz	3/32 MB	7 nm	65 W	No	128 GB	Yes	Yes	Unknown	Unknown

==== Server ====
- AMD Opteron (3000, 4000 and 6000 series at least)
- AMD EPYC Series of Products

=== Motherboards ===
Board		Chipset	Memory			LAN	SATA Ports	eSATA Ports	PCI	PCIe					Works on		
Manuf.	Model	Chipset	Max. (GB)	Slots	Type	LAN	SATA Ports	eSATA Ports	PCI	mini	×1	×4	×8	×16	QEMU-KVM	Xen	VMware ESXi
MSI	AM1I (Note: Not supported by Windows 11.)	AM1	16	2	DDR3	1× Gigabit	2×3.0	No	No	Yes	No	No	No	1×2.0@×4	Unknown	Unknown	No
Asus	E35M1-I DELUXE	A50 (Hudson M1)	8	2	DDR3	1× Gigabit	5×3.0	1×3.0	No	Yes	No	No	No	1×2.0@×4	Unknown	Unknown	No
Asus	F2A55-M	AMD A55 FCH (Hudson D2)	64	4	DDR3	1× Gigabit	6×2.0	No	1	No	1×2.0	No	No	2×2.0	Unknown	Unknown	Yes5.1
Asrock	FM2A75M-DGS	A75(Hudson D3)	32	2	DDR3	1× Gigabit	6×3.0	No	1	No	1×2.0	No	No	1×2.0	Unknown	Unknown	Yes 5.1
Asrock	FM2A75 Pro4-M	A75(Hudson D3)	64	4	DDR3	1× Gigabit	5×3.0	1×3.0	1	No	1×2.0	No	No	2×2.0	Unknown	Unknown	Unknown
Asrock	FM2A85 Extreme4-M	A85X (Hudson D4)	32	4	DDR3	1× Gigabit	7×3.0	1×3.0	1	No	1	No	No	2×2.0	Unknown	Unknown	No
Asrock	FM2A85X Extreme6	A85X (Hudson D4)	64	4	DDR3	1× Gigabit	7×3.0	1×3.0	2	No	2×2.0	No	No	3×2.0	Unknown	Unknown	Yes 5.1
Asus	F2A85-V PRO	A85X (Hudson D4)	64	4	DDR3	1× Gigabit	7×3.0	1×3.0	3	No	2×2.0	1×2.0	2×2.0	1×2.0	Unknown	Unknown	Yes5.1
Asus	F2A85-V	A85X (Hudson D4)	64	4	DDR3	1× Gigabit	7×3.0	1×3.0	2	No	2×2.0	1×2.0	No	1×2.0	Unknown	Unknown	Unknown
Gigabyte	F2A88XM-DS2	A88X	32	2	DDR3	1× Gigabit	4×3.0	Unknown	1	No	1			1	Unknown	Unknown	6.0. 6.5
Gigabyte	GA-F2A88XM-D3HP	A88X	64	4	DDR3	1× Gigabit	8×3.0	No	1	No	1×2.0	No	No	1×2.0, 1×3.0	Yes	Unknown 6.0, 6.5	Unknown
Asrock	Fatal1ty FM2A88X+ Killer	A88X (Bolton D4)	64	4	DDR3	1x Gigabit	8×3.0	No	3	No	1×2.0	No	No	2×2.0	Yes	Unknown	Unknown
Asrock	FM2A88X Extreme6+	A88X (Bolton D4)	64	4	DDR3	1× Gigabit	8×3.0	1×3.0	2	No	2×2.0	No	No	3×2.0	Unknown	No (Note: Incomplete or flawed BIOS APIC and/or IVRS tables)	Unknown
Asrock	FM2A88M Extreme4+	A88X (Bolton D4)	64	4	DDR3	1× Gigabit	7×3.0	No	1	No	1×2.0	No	No	1×3.0+1×2.0@×4	Unknown	Unknown	Unknown
Asus	A88X-PRO	AMD A88X (Bolton D4)	64	4	DDR3	1× Gigabit	6×2.0	2×2.0	2	No	2×2.0	No	No	3(1@×16 or 2@×8) +1@×4	Yes	Unknown	Unknown
Asus	Crosshair IV Formula	890FX	16	4	DDR3	1× Gigabit	6×3.0	1×3.0	2	No	No	1×2.0	No	3×2.0	Yes	No	Unknown
Asus	M5A97 R2.0	970	32	4	DDR3	1× Gigabit	6×3.0	No	2	No	2×2.0	No	No	2×2.0(1@×4)	Yes	Unknown	Unknown
Asus	M5A97 LE R2.0	970	32	4	DDR3	1× Gigabit	6×3.0	No	2	No	2×2.0	No	No	2×2.0(1@×4)	Yes	Unknown	Unknown
MSI	970A-G46	970	32	4	DDR3	1× Gigabit	6×3.0	No	2	No	2	No	No	2×2.0@8	Unknown	4.4.1	Unknown
Gigabyte	GA-970A-UD3	970	32	4	DDR3	1× Gigabit	6×3.0	No	2	No	3×2.0	1×2.0	No	1×2.0	Yes	Unknown	Yes v5.x
Asrock	970 Extreme3	970	64	4	DDR3	1× Gigabit	5×6.0	1×3.0	2	No	2×2.0	No	No	1×2.0, 1×2.0 @ 4×	Yes	Unknown	Yes 5.0
Asrock	970A-G/3.1	970	64	4	DDR3	1× Gigabit	6×3.0	No	1	No	2×2.0	No	No	1×2.0, 1×2.0 @ 4×	Unknown	Unknown	Unknown
Asus	M5A99X EVO R2.0	990X	32	4	DDR3	1× Gigabit	6×3.0	2×3.0	1	No	2×2.0	1×2.0	1×2.0	1×2.0	Unknown	Unknown	5.1, 5.5; no network card
Asus	Crosshair V Formula Z	990FX	32	4	DDR3	1× Gigabit	8×3.0	2×3.0	1	No	2×2.0	1×2.0	2×2.0	2×2.0	Need IVRS override (Note: ivrs_ioapic[9]=00:14.0 ivrs_ioapic[10]=00:00.1)	Yes	5.5
Asus	SABERTOOTH 990FX	990FX	32	4	DDR3	1× Gigabit	8×3.0	2×3.0	1	No	1×2.0	1×2.0	2×2.0	1×2.0	Yes	Need IVRS override (Note: ivrs_ioapic[9]=00:14.0 ivrs_ioapic[10]=00:00.1)	Yes
Asus	SABERTOOTH 990FX R2.0	990FX	32	4	DDR3	1× Gigabit	8×3.0	2×3.0	1	No	1×2.0	1×2.0	2×2.0	4×2.0	Unknown	Yes	5.1, 5.5; no network card
Gigabyte	GA-990FXA-UD7	990FX	32	4	DDR3	1× Gigabit	8×3.0	2×3.0	1	No	No	2×2.0	2×2.0	2×2.0	Yes	Unknown	Unknown
Gigabyte	GA-990FXA-UD5	990FX	32	4	DDR3	1× Gigabit	8×3.0	2×3.0	1	No	1×2.0	2×2.0	1×2.0	2×2.0	0.12.1	4.1.3	Unknown
Gigabyte	GA-990FXA-UD3	990FX	32	4	DDR3	1× Gigabit	6×3.0	2×3.0	1	No	1×2.0	2×2.0	No	2×2.0	Yes	Yes	Yes 5
Asus	KGPE-D16	SR5690	256	16	DDR3	2× Gigabit	6×2.0	No	1	No	No	1×2.0	1×2.0	3×2.0	Unknown	Unknown	Yes
Gigabyte	GA-AX370-Gaming 5	X370	64	4	DDR4	2× Gigabit	8×3.0	No	No	No	3×2.0	1 (x16 slot)	1×3.0 (x16 slot)	1×3.0	Yes (F6G =< BIOS <= F22 required)	Unknown	Unknown
MSI	X399 Gaming Pro Carbon AC	X399	128	8	DDR4	1x Gigabit	8x3.0	No	No	No	2x3.0	2x3.0(M.2 Slots)	2x3.0@X8	2x3.0@X16	Yes, with latest BIOS and QEMU version.	Unknown	Unknown
Gigabyte	X470-Aorus-Ultra-Gaming	X470	64	4	DDR4	1x Gigabit	6x3.0	No	No	No	1x3.0 (x16 slot)	1x3.0(x16 slot)	1x3.0	Yes bios F3 in use, F6 broke AMD raid, newer versions not tested	Unknown	Unknown	Unknown
ASRock	X470 Master SLI	X470	64	4	DDR4	1× Gigabit	6×3.0	No	No	No	4×2.0	No	No	2×3.0 @×8	Yes	Unknown	Unknown
Gigabyte	Aorus X570S Pro AX (rev 1.1)	X570	128	4	DDR4	2.5Gb	6x3.0	No	No	No	No	No	No	3x4.0	Yes	Unknown	Unknown
Manuf.	Model	Chipset	Max. (GB)	Slots	Type	LAN	SATA Ports	eSATA Ports	PCI	mini	×1	×4	×8	×16	QEMU-KVM	Xen	VMware ESXi
Board		Chipset	Memory			LAN	SATA Ports	eSATA Ports	PCI	PCIe					Works on		

=== Chipset ===
- AMD X570
- AMD X470
- AMD X370
- AMD X300
- AMD B350
- AMD 890FX
- AMD 9-series
- AMD A55, A75, A85, A88X
- SR5650/SR5670/SR5690

== Tested graphics card ==
List of GPUs tested on some VirtualMachine with IOMMU.

- qemu-kvm can't assign VGA and other PCI device at same time, due to SeaBIOS limitations (fixed on git).

=== AMD ===
Note: Newer AMD cards no longer have FLR bug as of 2021. This bug required a host reboot when GPU is in undefined state. https://github.com/gnif/vendor-reset

Card	Memory			PCIx		OpenGL	DirectX	Vulkan	OpenCL	GFLOPs		TBP (W)		Works on		
Card	Size (MB)	Width (bit)	Type	Version	Lanes	OpenGL	DirectX	Vulkan	OpenCL	Single	Double	Idle	Max.	QEMU-KVM	Xen	VMware ESXi
Radeon HD 5450 (Note: No longer supported.) (Note: Lacks hardware video encoders, and JPEG, MPEG-1, H.262, H.263, H.265, H.266, AVS1, AVS+, AVS2, AVS3, VP8, VP9 and AV1 hardware decoders.) (Note: Lacks HDCP 2.2 and higher.)	512	64	GDDR3	2.1	×16	4.4 (Note: 4.5 with beta driver.)	11 (11_0) SM 5.0	No	1.2	104	No	6.5	171	Yes	Yes	5.1
Radeon HD 5770	1024	128	GDDR5	2.1	×16	4.4	11 (11_0) SM 5.0	No	1.2	1360	No	18	108	1.0.1	Yes	Unknown
Radeon HD 5850	1024 - 2048	128	GDDR5	2.1	×16	4.4	11 (11_0) SM 5.0	No	1.2	2088	417.6	27	151	1.0.1	Yes	Unknown
Radeon HD 6870 (Note: Lacks hardware video encoders, and JPEG, H.265, H.266, AVS1, AVS+, AVS2, AVS3, VP8, VP9 and AV1 hardware decoders.)	1024 - 2048	256	GDDR5	2.1	×16	4.4	11 (11_0) SM 5.0	No	1.2	2016	413	19	151	1.0.1	Yes	Unknown
Radeon HD 6950	1024 - 2048	256	GDDR5	2.1	×16	4.4	11 (11_0) SM 5.0	No	1.2	2253	563	20	200	1.0.1	Yes	Unknown
Radeon HD 7750 (Note: Lacks MPEG-1, H.262, H.263, and VC-1 hardware encoders, and JPEG, H.265, H.266, AVS1, AVS+, AVS2, AVS3, VP8, VP9 and AV1 hardware codecs.)	1024	128	GDDR5	3.0	×16	4.6	12 (11_1) SM 6.5	1.2	2.1	921	57		55	Yes	Unknown	Unknown
Radeon HD 7970 - R9 280X	3072	384	GDDR5	3.0	×16	4.6	12 (11_1) SM 6.5	1.2	2.1	3789	947	15	230	Unknown	Yes	5.0
Radeon R7 260X	1024 - 2048	128	GDDR5	3.0	×16	4.6	12 (12_0) SM 6.5	1.2	2.1	1971	123		115	Yes	Unknown	Unknown
Radeon R7 360	2048	128	GDDR5	3.0	x16	4.6	12 (12_0) SM 6.5	1.2	2.1	1613	100.8		100	2.5.0	Unknown	Unknown
Radeon R7 370	2048 - 4096	256	GDDR5	3.0	x16	4.6	12 (12_0) SM 6.5	1.2	2.1	1997	124.8		110	2.5.0	Unknown	Unknown
Radeon R9 290	4096	512	GDDR5	3.0	×16	4.6	12 (12_0) SM 6.5	1.2	2.1	4848	606		250	Yes	4.4.1 w/ patch	Unknown
Radeon R9 Nano (Note: Lacks JPEG, MPEG-1, H.262, H.263, H.265 and VC-1 hardware encoders, and AVS1, AVS+, AVS2, AVS3, VP8, VP9, AV1, and H.266 hardware codecs.)	4096	4096	HBM	3.0	×16	4.6	12 (12_0) SM 6.5	1.2	2.1	8192	512		175	Yes	Unknown	Unknown
Radeon RX 460 (Note: Lacks JPEG, MPEG-1, H.262, H.263, and VC-1 hardware encoders, and AVS1, AVS+, AVS2, AVS3, VP8, VP9, AV1, and H.266 hardware codecs.) (Note: Lacks HDCP 2.3.)	4096	128	GDDR5	3.0	×16	4.6	12 (12_0) SM 6.7	1.3	2.1	1953	122		75	Yes	Unknown	Unknown
Radeon RX 480	8192	256	GDDR5	3.0	×16	4.6	12 (12_0) SM 6.7	1.3	2.1	5161	323		150	Yes	Yes	6.0
Radeon RX 560	4096	128	GDDR5	3.0	×16	4.6	12 (12_0) SM 6.7	1.3	2.1					Yes	Unknown	Unknown
Radeon RX 570	4096	256	GDDR5	3.0	×16	4.6	12 (12_0) SM 6.7	1.3	2.1	4784	299		150	Yes	Unknown	Unknown
Radeon RX 580	8192	256	GDDR5	3.0	x16	4.6	12 (12_0) SM 6.7	1.3	2.1	5792	362		185	5.0.0.7	Unknown	Unknown
Radeon VII	16384	4096	HBM2	3.0	x16	4.6	12 (12_1) SM 6.7	1.3	2.1	13800	3500		300	Yes	Unknown	Unknown
Radeon RX 6800 XT (Note: Lacks JPEG, MPEG-1, H.262, H.263, VC-1, and AV1 hardware encoders, and AVS1, AVS+, AVS2, AVS3, VP8, and H.266 hardware codecs.)	16384	256	GDDR6	4.0	x16	4.6	12 (12_2) SM 6.7	1.3	2.1	16819	1051		300	Yes	Unknown	Unknown
Card	Memory			PCIe		OpenGL	DirectX	Vulkan	OpenCL	GFLOPs		TBP (W)		Works on		
Card	Size (MB)	Width (bit)	Type	Version	Lanes	OpenGL	DirectX	Vulkan	OpenCL	Single	Double	Idle	Max.	QEMU-KVM	Xen	VMware ESXi

=== Nvidia ===
Note: Blackwell GPUs might suffer from the reset bug leading to a kernel soft-lock and might require a workaround

Card	Memory			PCIe		OpenGL	DirectX	Vulkan	OpenCL	GFLOPs		TBP (W) max.	Works on		
Card	Size (MB)	Width (bit)	Type	Version	Lanes	OpenGL	DirectX	Vulkan	OpenCL	Single	Double	TBP (W) max.	QEMU-KVM	Xen	VMware ESXi
GeForce GTX 460 (Note: No longer supported.) (Note: Lacks hardware video encoders, and JPEG, H.263, H.265, H.266, AVS1, AVS+, AVS2, AVS3, VP8, VP9 and AV1 hardware decoders.) (Note: Lacks HDCP 2.2 and higher.)	768-2048	192-256	GDDR5	2.0	×16	4.6	12 (11_0) SM 5.1	No	1.1	907.2	75.6	160	Yes	4.1	Unknown
Quadro 2000	1024	128	GDDR5	2.0	×16	4.6	12 (11_0) SM 5.1	No	1.1	480	40	62	Yes	4.1 and 4.3	Unknown
GeForce GT 740 (Note: Security updates for Kepler until September 2024.) (Note: Lacks MPEG-1, H.262, and VC-1 hardware encoders, and JPEG, H.263, H.265, H.266, AVS1, AVS+, AVS2, AVS3, VP8, VP9 and AV1 hardware codecs.)	2048	128	GDDR5	3.0	×16	4.6	12 (11_0) SM 6.5	1.2	3.0 (Note: In OpenCL 3.0, OpenCL 1.2 functionality has become a mandatory baseline, while all OpenCL 2.x and OpenCL 3.0 features were made optional.)	762	31.8	64	2.5.0	Unknown	Unknown
GeForce GTX 970 (Note: Lacks MPEG-1, H.262, VC-1, and VP8 hardware encoders, and JPEG, H.263, H.266, AVS1, AVS+, AVS2, AVS3, VP9 and AV1 hardware codecs.)	4096	256	GDDR5	2.0	×16	4.6	12 (12_1) SM 6.7	1.3	3.0	3494	109	145	Yes	Unknown	Unknown
GeForce GTX 980 Ti	6144	384	GDDR5	3.0	x16	4.6	12 (12_1) SM 6.7	1.3	3.0	5630	176	250	Yes	Unknown	Unknown
GeForce GTX 1050 (Note: Lacks MPEG-1, H.262, VC-1, and VP9 hardware encoders, and JPEG, H.263, H.266, AVS1, AVS+, AVS2, AVS3, VP8, and AV1 hardware codecs.) (Note: Lacks HDCP 2.3.)	2048	128	GDDR5	3.0	×16	4.6	12 (12_1) SM 6.7	1.3	3.0	1862	54	75	Yes	Unknown	Unknown
GeForce GTX 1060	6144	192	GDDR5	3.0	x16	4.6	12 (12_1) SM 6.7	1.3	3.0	3855	120	120	5.0.0.7	Unknown	Unknown
GeForce GTX 1070 (Note: Lacks MPEG-1, H.262, VC-1, VP8, and VP9 hardware encoders, and JPEG, H.263, H.266, AVS1, AVS+, AVS2, AVS3, and AV1 hardware codecs.)	8192	256	GDDR5	3.0	x16	4.6	12 (12_1) SM 6.7	1.3	3.0	5783	181	150	Yes	Unknown	Unknown
Quadro RTX 4000	8192	256	GDDR6	3.0	x16	4.6	12 (12_2) SM 6.7	1.3	3.0	7119	222.5	160	Yes	Unknown	Unknown
GeForce RTX 3060 (Note: Lacks MPEG-1, H.262, VC-1, VP8, VP9, and AV1 hardware encoders, and JPEG, H.263, H.266, AVS1, AVS+, AVS2, and AVS3 hardware codecs.)	12228	192	GDDR6	4.0	x16	4.6	12 (12_2) SM 6.7	1.3	3.0	9462	148	170	Yes	Unknown	Unknown
Card	Memory			PCIe		OpenGL	DirectX	Vulkan	OpenCL	GFLOPs		TBP (W) max.	Works on		
Card	Size (MB)	Width (bit)	Type	Version	Lanes	OpenGL	DirectX	Vulkan	OpenCL	Single	Double	TBP (W) max.	QEMU-KVM	Xen	VMware ESXi
