= Graphics address remapping table =

I/O memory management unit for graphics

The graphics address remapping table (GART), also known as the graphics aperture remapping table, or graphics translation table (GTT), is an I/O memory management unit (IOMMU) used by Accelerated Graphics Port (AGP) and PCI Express (PCIe) graphics cards. The GART allows the graphics card direct memory access (DMA) to the host system memory, through which buffers of textures, polygon meshes and other data are loaded. AMD later reused the same mechanism for I/O virtualization with other peripherals including disk controllers and network adapters.

A GART is used as a means of data exchange between the main memory and video memory through which buffers (i.e. paging/swapping) of textures, polygon meshes and other data are loaded, but can also be used to expand the amount of video memory available for systems with only integrated or shared graphics (i.e. no discrete or inbuilt graphics processor), such as Intel HD Graphics processors. However, this type of memory (expansion) remapping has a caveat that affects the entire system: specifically, any GART, pre-allocated memory becomes pooled and cannot be utilised for any other purposes but graphics memory and display rendering.

Since PCI Express, the GART is extended to the GTT (Graphics Translation Table), which acts as a buffer or cache between system memory and graphics card, and in PCI Express, the GTT buffer size is changeable by the GPU driver.

== Operating system support ==
=== Windows ===
Support for AGP GART was added since Windows 95 OSR2. Later, support for GTT was added since Windows XP SP2 and Windows Vista.

=== Linux ===
Jeff Hartmann served as the primary maintainer of the Linux kernel's agpgart driver, which began as part of Brian Paul's Utah GLX accelerated Mesa 3D driver project. The developers primarily targeted Linux 2.4.x kernels, but made patches available against older 2.2.x kernels. Dave Jones heavily reworked agpgart for the Linux 2.6.x kernels, along with more contributions from Jeff Hartmann.

=== FreeBSD ===
In FreeBSD, the agpgart driver appeared in its 4.1 release.

=== Solaris ===
AGPgart support was introduced into Solaris Express Developer Edition as of its 7/05 release.

== See also ==
- Direct Rendering Manager
- Desktop Window Manager
- Framebuffer
