= Ivy Bridge (microarchitecture) =

CPU microarchitecture by Intel

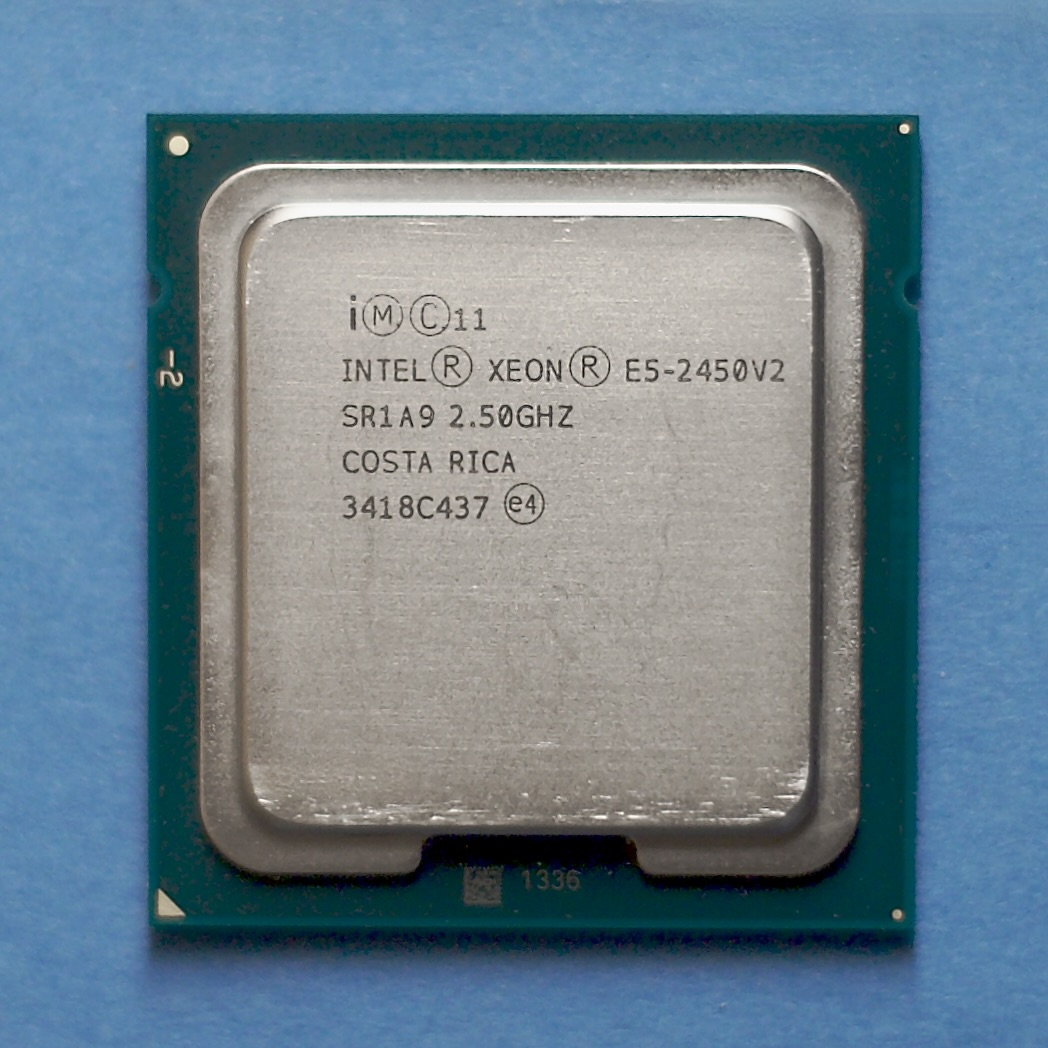
- Xeon E5-2450 v2, a server-oriented Ivy Bridge CPU

General information
- Launched: April 29, 2012; 14 years ago
- Discontinued: June 5, 2015; 11 years ago
- Marketed by: Intel
- Designed by: Intel
- Common manufacturer: Intel
- CPUID code: 0306A9h
- Product code: Desktop 80637 (LGA1155) 80633 (LGA2011); Mobile 80638; Server Xeon E5 80634 (LGA1356) 80635 (LGA2011); Xeon E7 80636 (LGA2011)

Performance
- Max. CPU clock rate: 1.4 to 4.1 GHz
- DMI speeds: 4 GT/s

Physical specifications
- Transistors: 634 million to 2.104 billion
- Cores: 2–4 (mainstream, mobile); 1-4 (embedded); 2–15 (Xeon)
- GPUs: None; HD Graphics 2500; HD Graphics 4000; HD Graphics P4000
- Sockets: Desktop & Workstation; LGA 1155; LGA 2011; Server; LGA 2011; LGA 2011-1; LGA 1356; Mobile; Socket G2; BGA 1023; BGA 1224; BGA 1284

Cache
- L1 cache: 64 KB per core (32 KB instructions + 32 KB data)
- L2 cache: 256 KB per core
- L3 cache: 2 to 37.5 MB shared

Architecture and classification
- Technology node: Intel 22 nm FinFET
- Instruction set: x86-16, IA-32, x86-64
- Extensions: MMX, SSE, SSE2, SSE3, SSSE3, SSE4.1, SSE4.2, AVX, F16C; AES-NI, CLMUL, RDRAND, TXT; VT-x, VT-d

Products, models, variants
- Models: Ivy Bridge-DT (desktop); Ivy Bridge-M (mobile); Ivy Bridge-EN (server, entry); Ivy Bridge-EP (server, efficient performance); Ivy Bridge-EX (server, expandable); Gladden (embedded)
- Brand names: Celeron; Pentium; Core; Xeon

History
- Predecessors: Westmere (tick, 32 nm); Sandy Bridge (tock)
- Successors: Haswell (tock); Broadwell (tick, 14 nm)

Support status
- Unsupported

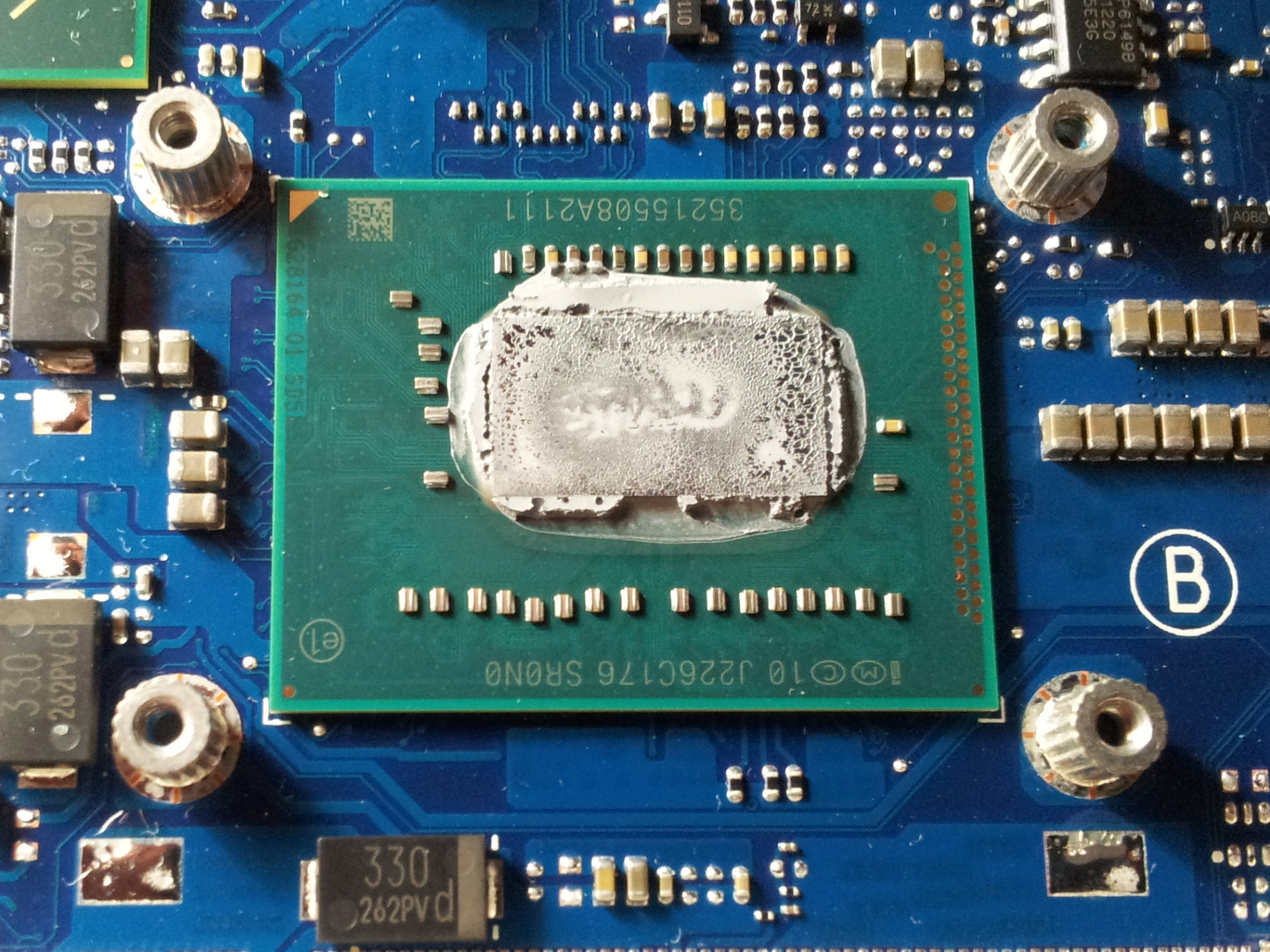
An uncovered Intel Core i5-3210M (BGA soldered) inside of a laptop, an Ivy Bridge CPU

Ivy Bridge is a 2012 CPU microarchitecture developed by Intel, and is used for third generation Core and Xeon v2-branded processors. As a 22 nm die shrink of its 32 nm predecessor, Sandy Bridge, it is the first Intel product to feature FinFET transistors. Ivy Bridge is the tick in the company's tick–tock model. Ivy Bridge is manufactured mainly as multi-core processors, with number of cores ranging from 1 to up to 15.

Ivy Bridge processors are backward compatible with the Sandy Bridge platform, but may require a firmware (BIOS) update depending on motherboard vendor. In 2011, Intel released the 7-series Panther Point chipsets with integrated USB 3.0 and SATA 3.0 to complement Ivy Bridge.

Volume production of Ivy Bridge chips began in the third quarter of 2011. Quad-core and dual-core-mobile models launched on April 29, 2012 and May 31, 2012 respectively. Core i3 desktop processors, as well as the first 22 nm Pentium, were announced and available the first week of September 2012.

Ivy Bridge is the last Intel platform on which Windows older than Windows 7 and Windows Server older than Windows Server 2008 R2 are officially supported by Microsoft. It is also the earliest Intel microarchitecture to officially support Windows 10 64-bit (NT 10.0).

== Overview ==
The Ivy Bridge CPU microarchitecture is a shrink from Sandy Bridge and remains largely unchanged. Like its predecessor, Sandy Bridge, Ivy Bridge was also primarily developed by Intel's Israel branch, located in Haifa, Israel. Notable improvements include:

- A new 22 nm Tri-gate transistor ("3-D") technology offers as much as a 50% reduction to power consumption at the same performance level as compared to 2-D planar transistors on Intel's 32 nm process.
- A new pseudorandom number generator and the RDRAND instruction, codenamed Bull Mountain.

== Features ==
Changes over Sandy Bridge include:

=== CPU ===
- F16C (16-bit floating-point conversion instructions) extension
- RDRAND instruction (Intel Secure Key)
- Max CPU multiplier of 63 (versus 57 for Sandy Bridge)
- Configurable TDP (cTDP) for mobile processors
- A 14- to 19-stage instruction pipeline, depending on the micro-operation cache hit or miss
- Supervisor Mode Execution Prevention
- CPUID Faulting support

Translation lookaside buffer sizes
Cache		Page Size		
Name	Level	4 KB	2 MB	1 GB
DTLB	1st	64	32	4
ITLB	1st	128	8 / logical core	none
STLB	2nd	512	none	none

=== GPU ===
- The built-in GPU has 6 or 16 execution units (EUs), compared to Sandy Bridge's 6 or 12.
- Intel HD Graphics with DirectX 11, OpenGL 4.0, and OpenCL 1.2 support on Windows. On Linux, OpenGL 4.2 is supported since Mesa 17.1.
- Support for up to three displays (with some limitations: with chipset of 7-series and using two of them with DisplayPort or eDP)
- Multiple 4K displays video playback
- Intel Quick Sync Video version 2

=== IO ===
- RAM support up to 2800 MT/s in 200 MHz increments
- DDR3L for mobile CPUs
- PCI Express 3.0 support (omitted on Core i3, Pentium, and ultra-low-voltage [ULV] processors)

=== Benchmark comparisons ===
Compared to its predecessor, Sandy Bridge:

- 3% to 6% increase in instructions per clock
- 25% to 68% increase in integrated GPU performance

=== Thermal performance issues ===
Ivy Bridge's temperatures are reportedly 10 °C higher compared to Sandy Bridge when a CPU is overclocked, even at default voltage setting. Impress PC Watch, a Japanese website, performed experiments that confirmed earlier speculations that this is because Intel used a poor quality (and perhaps lower cost) thermal interface material (thermal paste, or "TIM") between the chip and the heat spreader, instead of the fluxless solder of previous generations. The mobile Ivy Bridge processors are not affected by this issue because they do not use a heat spreader between the chip and cooling system. Socket 2011 Ivy Bridge processors continue to use the solder.

Enthusiast reports describe the TIM used by Intel as low-quality, and not up to par for a "premium" CPU, with some speculation that this is by design to encourage sales of prior processors. Further analyses caution that the processor can be damaged or void its warranty if home users attempt to remedy the matter. The TIM has much lower thermal conductivity, causing heat to trap on the die. Experiments with replacing this TIM with a higher-quality one or other heat removal methods showed a substantial temperature drop, and improvements to the increased voltages and overclocking sustainable by Ivy Bridge chips.

Intel claims that the smaller die of Ivy Bridge and the related increase in thermal density is expected to result in higher temperatures when the CPU is overclocked; Intel also stated that this is as expected and will likely not improve in future revisions.

=== Models and steppings ===
All Ivy Bridge processors with one, two, or four cores report the same CPUID model 0x000306A9, and are built in four different configurations differing in the number of cores, L3 cache and GPU execution units.

Die code name	CPUID	Stepping	Die size	Die dimensions	Transistors	Cores	GPU EUs	L3 cache	Sockets
Ivy Bridge-M-2	0x000306A9	P0	94 mm^{2}	7.656 × 12.223 mm	≈634 million (Note: Transistor counts for M-2, H-2 and HM-4 were determined by a comparison of transistor counts in Sandy Bridge and HE-4. Performing a comparative analysis gave counts of 108 million transistors per core, 67 million transistors per 1 MB of L3 cache, 88 million transistors for the memory controller and other chip features, and roughly 21 million transistors for each execution unit inside the Intel HD 4000. All this is an attempt to determine the transistor count mathematically, and is not backed by any sources. Thus, these transistor counts may be inaccurate.)	2	6	3 MB	LGA 1155, Socket G2, BGA-1224, BGA-1023, BGA-1284
Ivy Bridge-H-2	0x000306A9	L1	118 mm^{2}	8.141 × 14.505 mm	≈830 million	2	16	4 MB	LGA 1155, Socket G2, BGA-1224, BGA-1023, BGA-1284
Ivy Bridge-HM-4	0x000306A9	N0	133 mm^{2}	7.656 × 17.349 mm	≈1008 million	4	6	6 MB	LGA 1155, Socket G2, BGA-1224, BGA-1023, BGA-1284
Ivy Bridge-HE-4	0x000306A9	E1	160 mm^{2}	8.141 × 19.361 mm	≈1400 million	4	16	8 MB	LGA 1155, Socket G2, BGA-1224, BGA-1023, BGA-1284

== Ivy Bridge–based Xeon processors ==
Intel Ivy Bridge–based Xeon microprocessors (also known as Ivy Bridge-E) is the follow-up to Sandy Bridge-E, using the same CPU core as the Ivy Bridge processor, but in LGA 2011, LGA 1356 and LGA 2011-1 packages for workstations and servers.

Additional high-end server processors based on the Ivy Bridge architecture, code named Ivytown, were announced September 10, 2013 at the Intel Developer Forum, after the usual one year interval between consumer and server product releases.

The Ivy Bridge-EP processor line announced in September 2013 has up to 12 cores and 30 MB third level cache, with rumors of Ivy Bridge-EX up to 15 cores and an increased third level cache of up to 37.5 MB, although an early leaked lineup of Ivy Bridge-E included processors with a maximum of 6 cores.

Both Core-i7 and Xeon versions are produced: the Xeon versions marketed as Xeon E5-1400 v2 act as drop-in replacements for the existing Sandy Bridge-EN based Xeon E5, Xeon E5-2600 V2 versions act as drop-in replacements for the existing Sandy Bridge-EP based Xeon E5, while Core-i7 versions designated i7-4820K, i7-4930K and i7-4960X were released on September 10, 2013, remaining compatible with the X79 and LGA 2011 hardware.

For the intermediate LGA 1356 socket, Intel launched the Xeon E5-2400 v2 (codenamed Ivy Bridge-EN) series in January 2014. These have up to 10 cores.

A new Ivy Bridge-EX line marketed as Xeon E7 v2 had no corresponding predecessor using the Sandy Bridge microarchitecture but instead followed the older Westmere-EX processors.

== List of Ivy Bridge processors ==
Processors featuring Intel's HD 4000 graphics (or HD P4000 for Xeon) are set in bold. Other processors feature HD 2500 graphics or HD Graphics unless indicated by N/A.

=== Desktop processors ===
List of announced desktop processors, as follows:

Processor branding and model		Cores (threads)	CPU clock rate		GPU clock rate		L3 cache	TDP	Release date	Release price (USD)	Motherboard		
Processor branding and model		Cores (threads)	Normal	Turbo	Normal	Turbo	L3 cache	TDP	Release date	Release price (USD)	Socket	Interface	Memory
Core i7 Extreme	4960X	6 (12)	3.6 GHz	4.0 GHz	—N/a		15 MB	130 W	2013-09-10	$999	LGA; 2011	DMI 2.0; PCIe 3.0^{[a]}	Up to quad channel DDR3-1866
Core i7	4930K	6 (12)	3.4 GHz	3.9 GHz	—N/a		12 MB	130 W	2013-09-10	$583	LGA; 2011	DMI 2.0; PCIe 3.0^{[a]}	Up to quad channel DDR3-1866
Core i7	4820K	4 (8)	3.7 GHz	3.9 GHz	—N/a		10 MB	130 W	2013-09-10	$323	LGA; 2011	DMI 2.0; PCIe 3.0^{[a]}	Up to quad channel DDR3-1866
Core i7	**3770K**	4 (8)	3.5 GHz	3.9 GHz	650 MHz	1150 MHz	8 MB	77 W	2012-04-23	$332	LGA; 1155	DMI 2.0; PCIe 3.0^{[a]}	Up to dual channel DDR3-1600
Core i7	**3770**	4 (8)	3.4 GHz	3.9 GHz	650 MHz	1150 MHz	8 MB	77 W	2012-04-23	$294	LGA; 1155	DMI 2.0; PCIe 3.0^{[a]}	Up to dual channel DDR3-1600
Core i7	**3770S**	4 (8)	3.1 GHz	3.9 GHz	650 MHz	1150 MHz	8 MB	65 W	2012-04-23	$294	LGA; 1155	DMI 2.0; PCIe 3.0^{[a]}	Up to dual channel DDR3-1600
Core i7	**3770T**	4 (8)	2.5 GHz	3.7 GHz	650 MHz	1150 MHz	8 MB	45 W	2012-04-23	$294	LGA; 1155	DMI 2.0; PCIe 3.0^{[a]}	Up to dual channel DDR3-1600
Core i5	**3570K**	4 (4)	3.4 GHz	3.8 GHz	650 MHz	1150 MHz	6 MB	77 W	2012-04-23	$225	LGA; 1155	DMI 2.0; PCIe 3.0^{[a]}	Up to dual channel DDR3-1600
Core i5	3570	4 (4)	3.4 GHz	3.8 GHz	650 MHz	1150 MHz	6 MB	77 W	2012-05-31	$205	LGA; 1155	DMI 2.0; PCIe 3.0^{[a]}	Up to dual channel DDR3-1600
Core i5	3570S	4 (4)	3.1 GHz	3.8 GHz	650 MHz	1150 MHz	6 MB	65 W	2012-05-31	$205	LGA; 1155	DMI 2.0; PCIe 3.0^{[a]}	Up to dual channel DDR3-1600
Core i5	3570T	4 (4)	2.3 GHz	3.3 GHz	650 MHz	1150 MHz	6 MB	45 W	2012-05-31	$205	LGA; 1155	DMI 2.0; PCIe 3.0^{[a]}	Up to dual channel DDR3-1600
Core i5	3550	4 (4)	3.3 GHz	3.7 GHz	650 MHz	1150 MHz	6 MB	77 W	2012-04-23	$205	LGA; 1155	DMI 2.0; PCIe 3.0^{[a]}	Up to dual channel DDR3-1600
Core i5	3550S	4 (4)	3.0 GHz	3.7 GHz	650 MHz	1150 MHz	6 MB	65 W	2012-04-23	$205	LGA; 1155	DMI 2.0; PCIe 3.0^{[a]}	Up to dual channel DDR3-1600
Core i5	**3475S**	4 (4)	2.9 GHz	3.6 GHz	650 MHz	1050 MHz	6 MB	65 W	2012-05-31	$201	LGA; 1155	DMI 2.0; PCIe 3.0^{[a]}	Up to dual channel DDR3-1600
Core i5	3470	4 (4)	3.2 GHz	3.6 GHz	650 MHz	1050 MHz	6 MB	77 W	2012-05-31	$184	LGA; 1155	DMI 2.0; PCIe 3.0^{[a]}	Up to dual channel DDR3-1600
Core i5	3470S	4 (4)	2.9 GHz	3.6 GHz	650 MHz	1050 MHz	6 MB	65 W	2012-05-31	$184	LGA; 1155	DMI 2.0; PCIe 3.0^{[a]}	Up to dual channel DDR3-1600
Core i5	3470T	2 (4)	2.9 GHz	3.6 GHz	650 MHz	1050 MHz	3 MB	35 W	2012-05-31	$184	LGA; 1155	DMI 2.0; PCIe 3.0^{[a]}	Up to dual channel DDR3-1600
Core i5	3450	4 (4)	3.1 GHz	3.5 GHz	650 MHz	1050 MHz	6 MB	77 W	2012-04-23	$184	LGA; 1155	DMI 2.0; PCIe 3.0^{[a]}	Up to dual channel DDR3-1600
Core i5	3450S	4 (4)	2.8 GHz	3.5 GHz	650 MHz	1050 MHz	6 MB	65 W	2012-04-23	$184	LGA; 1155	DMI 2.0; PCIe 3.0^{[a]}	Up to dual channel DDR3-1600
Core i5	3350P	4 (4)	3.1 GHz	3.3 GHz	—N/a		6 MB	69 W	2012-09-03	$177	LGA; 1155	DMI 2.0; PCIe 3.0^{[a]}	Up to dual channel DDR3-1600
Core i5	3340	4 (4)	3.1 GHz	3.3 GHz	650 MHz	1050 MHz	6 MB	77 W	2013-09-01	$182	LGA; 1155	DMI 2.0; PCIe 3.0^{[a]}	Up to dual channel DDR3-1600
Core i5	3340S	4 (4)	2.8 GHz	3.3 GHz	650 MHz	1050 MHz	6 MB	65 W	2013-09-01	$182	LGA; 1155	DMI 2.0; PCIe 3.0^{[a]}	Up to dual channel DDR3-1600
Core i5	**3335S**	4 (4)	2.7 GHz	3.2 GHz	650 MHz	1050 MHz	6 MB	65 W	2012-09-03	$194	LGA; 1155	DMI 2.0; PCIe 3.0^{[a]}	Up to dual channel DDR3-1600
Core i5	3330S	4 (4)	2.7 GHz	3.2 GHz	650 MHz	1050 MHz	6 MB	65 W	2012-09-03	$177	LGA; 1155	DMI 2.0; PCIe 3.0^{[a]}	Up to dual channel DDR3-1600
Core i5	3330	4 (4)	3.0 GHz	3.2 GHz	650 MHz	1050 MHz	6 MB	77 W	2012-09-03	$182	LGA; 1155	DMI 2.0; PCIe 3.0^{[a]}	Up to dual channel DDR3-1600
Core i3	3250	2 (4)	3.5 GHz	—N/a	650 MHz	1050 MHz	3 MB	55 W	2013-06-09	$138	LGA; 1155	DMI 2.0; PCIe 2.0	Up to dual channel DDR3-1600
Core i3	**3245**	2 (4)	3.4 GHz	—N/a	650 MHz	1050 MHz	3 MB	55 W	2013-06-09	$134	LGA; 1155	DMI 2.0; PCIe 2.0	Up to dual channel DDR3-1600
Core i3	3240	2 (4)	3.4 GHz	—N/a	650 MHz	1050 MHz	3 MB	55 W	2012-09-03	$138	LGA; 1155	DMI 2.0; PCIe 2.0	Up to dual channel DDR3-1600
Core i3	**3225**	2 (4)	3.3 GHz	—N/a	650 MHz	1050 MHz	3 MB	55 W	2012-09-03	$134	LGA; 1155	DMI 2.0; PCIe 2.0	Up to dual channel DDR3-1600
Core i3	3220	2 (4)	3.3 GHz	—N/a	650 MHz	1050 MHz	3 MB	55 W	2012-09-03	$117	LGA; 1155	DMI 2.0; PCIe 2.0	Up to dual channel DDR3-1600
Core i3	3210	2 (4)	3.2 GHz	—N/a	650 MHz	1050 MHz	3 MB	55 W	2013-01-20	$117	LGA; 1155	DMI 2.0; PCIe 2.0	Up to dual channel DDR3-1600
Core i3	3250T	2 (4)	3.0 GHz	—N/a	650 MHz	1050 MHz	3 MB	35 W	2013-06-09	$138	LGA; 1155	DMI 2.0; PCIe 2.0	Up to dual channel DDR3-1600
Core i3	3240T	2 (4)	2.9 GHz	—N/a	650 MHz	1050 MHz	3 MB	35 W	2012-09-03	$138	LGA; 1155	DMI 2.0; PCIe 2.0	Up to dual channel DDR3-1600
Core i3	3220T	2 (4)	2.8 GHz	—N/a	650 MHz	1050 MHz	3 MB	35 W	2012-09-03	$117	LGA; 1155	DMI 2.0; PCIe 2.0	Up to dual channel DDR3-1600
Pentium	G2140	2 (2)	3.3 GHz	—N/a	650 MHz	1050 MHz	3 MB	55 W	2013-06-09	$86	LGA; 1155	DMI 2.0; PCIe 2.0	Up to dual channel DDR3-1600
Pentium	G2130	2 (2)	3.2 GHz	—N/a	650 MHz	1050 MHz	3 MB	55 W	2013-01-20	$86	LGA; 1155	DMI 2.0; PCIe 2.0	Up to dual channel DDR3-1600
Pentium	G2120	2 (2)	3.1 GHz	—N/a	650 MHz	1050 MHz	3 MB	55 W	2012-09-03	$86	LGA; 1155	DMI 2.0; PCIe 2.0	Up to dual channel DDR3-1600
Pentium	G2120T	2 (2)	2.7 GHz	—N/a	650 MHz	1050 MHz	3 MB	35 W	2013-06-09	$75	LGA; 1155	DMI 2.0; PCIe 2.0	Up to dual channel DDR3-1600
Pentium	G2100T	2 (2)	2.6 GHz	—N/a	650 MHz	1050 MHz	3 MB	35 W	2012-09-03	$75	LGA; 1155	DMI 2.0; PCIe 2.0	Up to dual channel DDR3-1600
Pentium	G2030	2 (2)	3.0 GHz	—N/a	650 MHz	1050 MHz	3 MB	55 W	2013-06-09	$64	LGA; 1155	DMI 2.0; PCIe 2.0	Dual channel DDR3-1333
Pentium	G2020	2 (2)	2.9 GHz	—N/a	650 MHz	1050 MHz	3 MB	55 W	2013-01-20	$64	LGA; 1155	DMI 2.0; PCIe 2.0	Dual channel DDR3-1333
Pentium	G2010	2 (2)	2.8 GHz	—N/a	650 MHz	1050 MHz	3 MB	55 W	2013-01-20	$64	LGA; 1155	DMI 2.0; PCIe 2.0	Dual channel DDR3-1333
Pentium	G2030T	2 (2)	2.6 GHz	—N/a	650 MHz	1050 MHz	3 MB	35 W	2013-06-09	$64	LGA; 1155	DMI 2.0; PCIe 2.0	Dual channel DDR3-1333
Pentium	G2020T	2 (2)	2.5 GHz	—N/a	650 MHz	1050 MHz	3 MB	35 W	2013-01-20	$64	LGA; 1155	DMI 2.0; PCIe 2.0	Dual channel DDR3-1333
Celeron	G1630	2 (2)	2.8 GHz	—N/a	650 MHz	1050 MHz	2 MB	55 W	2013-09-01	$52	LGA; 1155	DMI 2.0; PCIe 2.0	Dual channel DDR3-1333
Celeron	G1620	2 (2)	2.7 GHz	—N/a	650 MHz	1050 MHz	2 MB	55 W	2013-01-20	$52	LGA; 1155	DMI 2.0; PCIe 2.0	Dual channel DDR3-1333
Celeron	G1610	2 (2)	2.6 GHz	—N/a	650 MHz	1050 MHz	2 MB	55 W	2013-01-20	$42	LGA; 1155	DMI 2.0; PCIe 2.0	Dual channel DDR3-1333
Celeron	G1620T	2 (2)	2.4 GHz	—N/a	650 MHz	1050 MHz	2 MB	35 W	2013-09-01	$42	LGA; 1155	DMI 2.0; PCIe 2.0	Dual channel DDR3-1333
Celeron	G1610T	2 (2)	2.3 GHz	—N/a	650 MHz	1050 MHz	2 MB	35 W	2013-01-20	$42	LGA; 1155	DMI 2.0; PCIe 2.0	Dual channel DDR3-1333

1. Requires a compatible motherboard with 7 series chipsets.

Suffixes to denote:

- K – Unlocked (adjustable CPU multiplier up to 63 times)
- S – Performance-optimized lifestyle (low power with 65 W TDP)
- T – Power-optimized lifestyle (ultra-low power consumption with 35–45 W TDP)
- P – No on-die video chipset
- X – Extreme performance (adjustable CPU ratio with no ratio limit)

=== Server processors ===
Processor branding and model		Cores (threads)	CPU clock rate		GPU clock rate		L3 cache	TDP	Release date	Price (USD)	Motherboard		
Processor branding and model		Cores (threads)	Normal	Turbo	Normal	Turbo	L3 cache	TDP	Release date	Price (USD)	Socket	Interface	Memory
Xeon E7	8893v2	6 (12)	3.4 GHz	3.7 GHz	—N/a		37.5 MB	155 W	2014-02-18	$6841	LGA; 2011-1	3× QPI; DMI 2.0; PCIe 3.0	Up to quad channel DDR3-1600
Xeon E7	8891v2	10 (20)	3.2 GHz	3.7 GHz	—N/a		37.5 MB	155 W	2014-02-18	$6841	LGA; 2011-1	3× QPI; DMI 2.0; PCIe 3.0	Up to quad channel DDR3-1600
Xeon E7	8895v2	15 (30)	2.8 GHz	3.6 GHz	—N/a		37.5 MB	155 W	2014-02-18	OEM (Oracle)	LGA; 2011-1	3× QPI; DMI 2.0; PCIe 3.0	Up to quad channel DDR3-1600
Xeon E7	8890v2	15 (30)	2.8 GHz	3.4 GHz	—N/a		37.5 MB	155 W	2014-02-18	$6841	LGA; 2011-1	3× QPI; DMI 2.0; PCIe 3.0	Up to quad channel DDR3-1600
Xeon E7	4890v2	15 (30)	2.8 GHz	3.4 GHz	—N/a		37.5 MB	155 W	2014-02-18	$6619	LGA; 2011-1	3× QPI; DMI 2.0; PCIe 3.0	Up to quad channel DDR3-1600
Xeon E7	2890v2	15 (30)	2.8 GHz	3.4 GHz	—N/a		37.5 MB	155 W	2014-02-18	$6451	LGA; 2011-1	3× QPI; DMI 2.0; PCIe 3.0	Up to quad channel DDR3-1600
Xeon E7	8880Lv2	15 (30)	2.2 GHz	2.8 GHz	—N/a		37.5 MB	105 W	2014-02-18	$5729	LGA; 2011-1	3× QPI; DMI 2.0; PCIe 3.0	Up to quad channel DDR3-1600
Xeon E7	8880v2	15 (30)	2.5 GHz	3.1 GHz	—N/a		37.5 MB	130 W	2014-02-18	$5729	LGA; 2011-1	3× QPI; DMI 2.0; PCIe 3.0	Up to quad channel DDR3-1600
Xeon E7	4880v2	15 (30)	2.5 GHz	3.1 GHz	—N/a		37.5 MB	130 W	2014-02-18	$5506	LGA; 2011-1	3× QPI; DMI 2.0; PCIe 3.0	Up to quad channel DDR3-1600
Xeon E7	2880v2	15 (30)	2.5 GHz	3.1 GHz	—N/a		37.5 MB	130 W	2014-02-18	$5339	LGA; 2011-1	3× QPI; DMI 2.0; PCIe 3.0	Up to quad channel DDR3-1600
Xeon E7	8870v2	15 (30)	2.3 GHz	2.9 GHz	—N/a		30 MB	130 W	2014-02-18	$4616	LGA; 2011-1	3× QPI; DMI 2.0; PCIe 3.0	Up to quad channel DDR3-1600
Xeon E7	4870v2	15 (30)	2.3 GHz	2.9 GHz	—N/a		30 MB	130 W	2014-02-18	$4394	LGA; 2011-1	3× QPI; DMI 2.0; PCIe 3.0	Up to quad channel DDR3-1600
Xeon E7	2870v2	15 (30)	2.3 GHz	2.9 GHz	—N/a		30 MB	130 W	2014-02-18	$4227	LGA; 2011-1	3× QPI; DMI 2.0; PCIe 3.0	Up to quad channel DDR3-1600
Xeon E7	8857v2	12 (12)	3.0 GHz	3.6 GHz	—N/a		30 MB	130 W	2014-02-18	$3838	LGA; 2011-1	3× QPI; DMI 2.0; PCIe 3.0	Up to quad channel DDR3-1600
Xeon E7	4860v2	12 (24)	2.6 GHz	3.2 GHz	—N/a		30 MB	130 W	2014-02-18	$3838	LGA; 2011-1	3× QPI; DMI 2.0; PCIe 3.0	Up to quad channel DDR3-1600
Xeon E7	8850v2	12 (24)	2.3 GHz	2.8 GHz	—N/a		24 MB	105 W	2014-02-18	$3059	LGA; 2011-1	3× QPI; DMI 2.0; PCIe 3.0	Up to quad channel DDR3-1600
Xeon E7	4850v2	12 (24)	2.3 GHz	2.8 GHz	—N/a		24 MB	105 W	2014-02-18	$2837	LGA; 2011-1	3× QPI; DMI 2.0; PCIe 3.0	Up to quad channel DDR3-1600
Xeon E7	2850v2	12 (24)	2.3 GHz	2.8 GHz	—N/a		24 MB	105 W	2014-02-18	$2558	LGA; 2011-1	3× QPI; DMI 2.0; PCIe 3.0	Up to quad channel DDR3-1600
Xeon E7	4830v2	10 (20)	2.2 GHz	2.7 GHz	—N/a		20 MB	105 W	2014-02-18	$2059	LGA; 2011-1	3× QPI; DMI 2.0; PCIe 3.0	Up to quad channel DDR3-1600
Xeon E7	4820v2	8 (16)	2.0 GHz	2.5 GHz	—N/a		16 MB	105 W	2014-02-18	$1446	LGA; 2011-1	3× QPI; DMI 2.0; PCIe 3.0	Up to quad channel DDR3-1600
Xeon E7	4809v2	6 (12)	1.9 GHz	—N/a	—N/a		12 MB	105 W	2014-02-18	$1223	LGA; 2011-1	3× QPI; DMI 2.0; PCIe 3.0	Up to quad channel DDR3-1333
Xeon E5	4657Lv2	12 (24)	2.4 GHz	3.2 GHz	—N/a		30 MB	115 W	2014-03-03	$4394	LGA; 2011	2× QPI; DMI 2.0; PCIe 3.0	Up to quad channel DDR3-1866
Xeon E5	4650v2	10 (20)	2.4 GHz	3.2 GHz	—N/a		25 MB	95 W	2014-03-03	$3616	LGA; 2011	2× QPI; DMI 2.0; PCIe 3.0	Up to quad channel DDR3-1866
Xeon E5	4640v2	10 (20)	2.2 GHz	2.7 GHz	—N/a		20 MB	95 W	2014-03-03	$2725	LGA; 2011	2× QPI; DMI 2.0; PCIe 3.0	Up to quad channel DDR3-1866
Xeon E5	4624Lv2	10 (20)	1.9 GHz	2.5 GHz	—N/a		25 MB	70 W	2014-03-03	$2405	LGA; 2011	2× QPI; DMI 2.0; PCIe 3.0	Up to quad channel DDR3-1866
Xeon E5	4627v2	8 (8)	3.3 GHz	3.6 GHz	—N/a		16 MB	130 W	2014-03-03	$2108	LGA; 2011	2× QPI; DMI 2.0; PCIe 3.0	Up to quad channel DDR3-1866
Xeon E5	4620v2	8 (16)	2.6 GHz	3.0 GHz	—N/a		20 MB	95 W	2014-03-03	$1611	LGA; 2011	2× QPI; DMI 2.0; PCIe 3.0	Up to quad channel DDR3-1600
Xeon E5	4610v2	8 (16)	2.3 GHz	2.7 GHz	—N/a		16 MB	95 W	2014-03-03	$1219	LGA; 2011	2× QPI; DMI 2.0; PCIe 3.0	Up to quad channel DDR3-1600
Xeon E5	4607v2	6 (12)	2.6 GHz	—N/a	—N/a		15 MB	95 W	2014-03-03	$885	LGA; 2011	2× QPI; DMI 2.0; PCIe 3.0	Up to quad channel DDR3-1333
Xeon E5	4603v2	4 (8)	2.2 GHz	—N/a	—N/a		10 MB	95 W	2014-03-03	$551	LGA; 2011	2× QPI; DMI 2.0; PCIe 3.0	Up to quad channel DDR3-1333
Xeon E5	2697v2	12 (24)	2.7 GHz	3.5 GHz	—N/a		30 MB	130 W	2013-09-10	$2614	LGA; 2011	2× QPI; DMI 2.0; PCIe 3.0	Up to quad channel DDR3-1866
Xeon E5	2696v2	12 (24)	2.5 GHz	3.3 GHz	—N/a		30 MB	120 W	2013-09-10	OEM	LGA; 2011	2× QPI; DMI 2.0; PCIe 3.0	Up to quad channel DDR3-1866
Xeon E5	2695v2	12 (24)	2.4 GHz	3.2 GHz	—N/a		30 MB	115 W	2013-09-10	$2336	LGA; 2011	2× QPI; DMI 2.0; PCIe 3.0	Up to quad channel DDR3-1866
Xeon E5	2692v2	12 (24)	2.2 GHz	3.0 GHz	—N/a		30 MB	115 W	June 2013	OEM (Tianhe-2)	LGA; 2011	2× QPI; DMI 2.0; PCIe 3.0	Up to quad channel DDR3-1866
Xeon E5	2651v2	12 (24)	1.8 GHz	2.2 GHz	—N/a		30 MB	105 W	2013-09-10		LGA; 2011	2× QPI; DMI 2.0; PCIe 3.0	Up to quad channel DDR3-1866
Xeon E5	2690v2	10 (20)	3.0 GHz	3.6 GHz	—N/a		25 MB	130 W	2013-09-10	$2057	LGA; 2011	2× QPI; DMI 2.0; PCIe 3.0	Up to quad channel DDR3-1866
Xeon E5	2680v2	10 (20)	2.8 GHz	3.6 GHz	—N/a		25 MB	115 W	2013-09-10	$1723	LGA; 2011	2× QPI; DMI 2.0; PCIe 3.0	Up to quad channel DDR3-1866
Xeon E5	2670v2	10 (20)	2.5 GHz	3.3 GHz	—N/a		25 MB	115 W	2013-09-10	$1552	LGA; 2011	2× QPI; DMI 2.0; PCIe 3.0	Up to quad channel DDR3-1866
Xeon E5	2660v2	10 (20)	2.2 GHz	3.0 GHz	—N/a		25 MB	95 W	2013-09-10	$1389	LGA; 2011	2× QPI; DMI 2.0; PCIe 3.0	Up to quad channel DDR3-1866
Xeon E5	2658v2	10 (20)	2.4 GHz	3.0 GHz	—N/a		25 MB	95 W	2013-09-10	$1750	LGA; 2011	2× QPI; DMI 2.0; PCIe 3.0	Up to quad channel DDR3-1866
Xeon E5	2650Lv2	10 (20)	1.7 GHz	2.1 GHz	—N/a		25 MB	70 W	2013-09-10	$1219	LGA; 2011	2× QPI; DMI 2.0; PCIe 3.0	Up to quad channel DDR3-1600
Xeon E5	2648Lv2	10 (20)	1.9 GHz	2.5 GHz	—N/a		25 MB	70 W	2013-09-10	$1479	LGA; 2011	2× QPI; DMI 2.0; PCIe 3.0	Up to quad channel DDR3-1866
Xeon E5	2687Wv2	8 (16)	3.4 GHz	4.0 GHz	—N/a		25 MB	150 W	2013-09-10	$2108	LGA; 2011	2× QPI; DMI 2.0; PCIe 3.0	Up to quad channel DDR3-1866
Xeon E5	2667v2	8 (16)	3.3 GHz	4.0 GHz	—N/a		25 MB	130 W	2013-09-10	$2057	LGA; 2011	2× QPI; DMI 2.0; PCIe 3.0	Up to quad channel DDR3-1866
Xeon E5	2650v2	8 (16)	2.6 GHz	3.4 GHz	—N/a		20 MB	95 W	2013-09-10	$1166	LGA; 2011	2× QPI; DMI 2.0; PCIe 3.0	Up to quad channel DDR3-1866
Xeon E5	2640v2	8 (16)	2.0 GHz	2.5 GHz	—N/a		20 MB	95 W	2013-09-10	$885	LGA; 2011	2× QPI; DMI 2.0; PCIe 3.0	Up to quad channel DDR3-1600
Xeon E5	2628Lv2	8 (16)	1.9 GHz	2.4 GHz	—N/a		20 MB	70 W	2013-09-10	$1216	LGA; 2011	2× QPI; DMI 2.0; PCIe 3.0	Up to quad channel DDR3-1600
Xeon E5	2643v2	6 (12)	3.5 GHz	3.8 GHz	—N/a		25 MB	130 W	2013-09-10	$1552	LGA; 2011	2× QPI; DMI 2.0; PCIe 3.0	Up to quad channel DDR3-1866
Xeon E5	2630v2	6 (12)	2.6 GHz	3.1 GHz	—N/a		15 MB	80 W	2013-09-10	$612	LGA; 2011	2× QPI; DMI 2.0; PCIe 3.0	Up to quad channel DDR3-1600
Xeon E5	2630Lv2	6 (12)	2.4 GHz	2.8 GHz	—N/a		15 MB	60 W	2013-09-10	$612	LGA; 2011	2× QPI; DMI 2.0; PCIe 3.0	Up to quad channel DDR3-1600
Xeon E5	2620v2	6 (12)	2.1 GHz	2.6 GHz	—N/a		15 MB	80 W	2013-09-10	$406	LGA; 2011	2× QPI; DMI 2.0; PCIe 3.0	Up to quad channel DDR3-1600
Xeon E5	2618Lv2	6 (12)	2.0 GHz	—N/a	—N/a		15 MB	50 W	2013-09-10	$520	LGA; 2011	2× QPI; DMI 2.0; PCIe 3.0	Up to quad channel DDR3-1333
Xeon E5	2637v2	4 (8)	3.5 GHz	3.8 GHz	—N/a		15 MB	130 W	2013-09-10	$996	LGA; 2011	2× QPI; DMI 2.0; PCIe 3.0	Up to quad channel DDR3-1866
Xeon E5	2609v2	4 (4)	2.5 GHz	—N/a	—N/a		10 MB	80 W	2013-09-10	$294	LGA; 2011	2× QPI; DMI 2.0; PCIe 3.0	Up to quad channel DDR3-1333
Xeon E5	2603v2	4 (4)	1.8 GHz	—N/a	—N/a		10 MB	80 W	2013-09-10	$202	LGA; 2011	2× QPI; DMI 2.0; PCIe 3.0	Up to quad channel DDR3-1333
Xeon E5	2470v2	10 (20)	2.4 GHz	3.2 GHz	—N/a		25 MB	95 W	2014-01-09	$1440	LGA; 1356	1× QPI; DMI 2.0; PCIe 3.0	Up to triple channel DDR3-1600
Xeon E5	2448Lv2	10 (20)	1.8 GHz	2.4 GHz	—N/a		25 MB	70 W	2014-01-09	$1424	LGA; 1356	1× QPI; DMI 2.0; PCIe 3.0	Up to triple channel DDR3-1600
Xeon E5	2450Lv2	10 (20)	1.7 GHz	2.1 GHz	—N/a		25 MB	60 W	2014-01-09	$1219	LGA; 1356	1× QPI; DMI 2.0; PCIe 3.0	Up to triple channel DDR3-1600
Xeon E5	2450v2	8 (16)	2.5 GHz	3.3 GHz	—N/a		20 MB	95 W	2014-01-09	$1107	LGA; 1356	1× QPI; DMI 2.0; PCIe 3.0	Up to triple channel DDR3-1600
Xeon E5	2440v2	8 (16)	1.9 GHz	2.4 GHz	—N/a		20 MB	95 W	2014-01-09	$832	LGA; 1356	1× QPI; DMI 2.0; PCIe 3.0	Up to triple channel DDR3-1600
Xeon E5	2428Lv2	8 (16)	1.8 GHz	2.3 GHz	—N/a		20 MB	60 W	2014-01-09	$1013	LGA; 1356	1× QPI; DMI 2.0; PCIe 3.0	Up to triple channel DDR3-1600
Xeon E5	2430v2	6 (12)	2.5 GHz	3.0 GHz	—N/a		15 MB	80 W	2014-01-09	$551	LGA; 1356	1× QPI; DMI 2.0; PCIe 3.0	Up to triple channel DDR3-1600
Xeon E5	2420v2	6 (12)	2.2 GHz	2.7 GHz	—N/a		15 MB	80 W	2014-01-09	$406	LGA; 1356	1× QPI; DMI 2.0; PCIe 3.0	Up to triple channel DDR3-1600
Xeon E5	2430Lv2	6 (12)	2.4 GHz	2.8 GHz	—N/a		15 MB	60 W	2014-01-09	$612	LGA; 1356	1× QPI; DMI 2.0; PCIe 3.0	Up to triple channel DDR3-1600
Xeon E5	2418Lv2	6 (12)	2.0 GHz	—N/a	—N/a		15 MB	50 W	2014-01-09	$607	LGA; 1356	1× QPI; DMI 2.0; PCIe 3.0	Up to triple channel DDR3-1333
Xeon E5	2407v2	4 (4)	2.4 GHz	—N/a	—N/a		10 MB	80 W	2014-01-09	$250	LGA; 1356	1× QPI; DMI 2.0; PCIe 3.0	Up to triple channel DDR3-1333
Xeon E5	2403v2	4 (4)	1.8 GHz	—N/a	—N/a		10 MB	80 W	2014-01-09	$192	LGA; 1356	1× QPI; DMI 2.0; PCIe 3.0	Up to triple channel DDR3-1333
Xeon E5	1680v2	8 (16)	3.0 GHz	3.9 GHz	—N/a		25 MB	130 W	2013-09-10	$1723	LGA; 2011	0× QPI; DMI 2.0; PCIe 3.0	Up to quad channel DDR3-1866
Xeon E5	1660v2	6 (12)	3.7 GHz	4.0 GHz	—N/a		15 MB	130 W	2013-09-10	$1080	LGA; 2011	0× QPI; DMI 2.0; PCIe 3.0	Up to quad channel DDR3-1866
Xeon E5	1650v2	6 (12)	3.5 GHz	3.9 GHz	—N/a		12 MB	130 W	2013-09-10	$583	LGA; 2011	0× QPI; DMI 2.0; PCIe 3.0	Up to quad channel DDR3-1866
Xeon E5	1620v2	4 (8)	3.7 GHz	3.9 GHz	—N/a		10 MB	130 W	2013-09-10	$294	LGA; 2011	0× QPI; DMI 2.0; PCIe 3.0	Up to quad channel DDR3-1866
Xeon E5	1607v2	4 (4)	3.0 GHz	—N/a	—N/a		10 MB	130 W	2013-09-10	$244	LGA; 2011	0× QPI; DMI 2.0; PCIe 3.0	Up to quad channel DDR3-1600
Xeon E5	1428Lv2	6 (12)	2.2 GHz	2.7 GHz	—N/a		15 MB	60 W	2014-01-09	$494	LGA; 1356	0× QPI; DMI 2.0; PCIe 3.0	Up to triple channel DDR3-1600
Xeon E5	1410v2	4 (8)	2.8 GHz	3.2 GHz	—N/a		10 MB	80 W	2014-01-09	OEM	LGA; 1356	0× QPI; DMI 2.0; PCIe 3.0	Up to triple channel DDR3-1600
Pentium	1403v2	2 (2)	2.6 GHz	—N/a	—N/a		6 MB	80 W	2014-01-09	OEM	LGA; 1356	0× QPI; DMI 2.0; PCIe 3.0	Up to triple channel DDR3-1600
Pentium	1405v2	2 (2)	1.4 GHz	—N/a	—N/a		6 MB	40 W	2014-01-09	$156	LGA; 1356	0× QPI; DMI 2.0; PCIe 3.0	Up to triple channel DDR3-1600
Xeon E3	1290v2	4 (8)	3.7 GHz	4.1 GHz	—N/a		8 MB	87 W	2012-05-14	$885	LGA; 1155	DMI 2.0; PCIe 3.0	Up to dual channel DDR3-1600
Xeon E3	1280v2	4 (8)	3.6 GHz	4.0 GHz	—N/a		8 MB	69 W	2012-05-14	$623	LGA; 1155	DMI 2.0; PCIe 3.0	Up to dual channel DDR3-1600
Xeon E3	**1275v2**	4 (8)	3.5 GHz	3.9 GHz	650 MHz	1.25 GHz	8 MB	77 W	2012-05-14	$350	LGA; 1155	DMI 2.0; PCIe 3.0	Up to dual channel DDR3-1600
Xeon E3	1270v2	4 (8)	3.5 GHz	3.9 GHz	—N/a		8 MB	69 W	2012-05-14	$339	LGA; 1155	DMI 2.0; PCIe 3.0	Up to dual channel DDR3-1600
Xeon E3	1265Lv2	4 (8)	2.5 GHz	3.5 GHz	650 MHz	1.15 GHz	8 MB	45 W	2012-05-14	$305	LGA; 1155	DMI 2.0; PCIe 3.0	Up to dual channel DDR3-1600
Xeon E3	**1245v2**	4 (8)	3.4 GHz	3.8 GHz	650 MHz	1.25 GHz	8 MB	77 W	2012-05-14	$273	LGA; 1155	DMI 2.0; PCIe 3.0	Up to dual channel DDR3-1600
Xeon E3	1240v2	4 (8)	3.4 GHz	3.8 GHz	—N/a		8 MB	69 W	2012-05-14	$261	LGA; 1155	DMI 2.0; PCIe 3.0	Up to dual channel DDR3-1600
Xeon E3	1230v2	4 (8)	3.3 GHz	3.7 GHz	—N/a		8 MB	69 W	2012-05-14	$230	LGA; 1155	DMI 2.0; PCIe 3.0	Up to dual channel DDR3-1600
Xeon E3	**1225v2**	4 (4)	3.2 GHz	3.6 GHz	650 MHz	1.25 GHz	8 MB	77 W	2012-05-14	$224	LGA; 1155	DMI 2.0; PCIe 3.0	Up to dual channel DDR3-1600
Xeon E3	1220v2	4 (4)	3.1 GHz	3.5 GHz	—N/a		8 MB	69 W	2012-05-14	$203	LGA; 1155	DMI 2.0; PCIe 3.0	Up to dual channel DDR3-1600
Xeon E3	1220Lv2	2 (4)	2.3 GHz	3.5 GHz	—N/a		3 MB	17 W	2012-05-14	$189	LGA; 1155	DMI 2.0; PCIe 3.0	Up to dual channel DDR3-1600
Xeon E3	1135Cv2	4 (8)	3.0 GHz	—N/a	—N/a		8 MB	55 W	2013-09-10	OEM	BGA; 1284	DMI 2.0; PCIe 3.0	Up to dual channel DDR3-1600
Xeon E3	1125Cv2	4 (8)	2.5 GHz	—N/a	—N/a		8 MB	40 W	2013-09-10	$448	BGA; 1284	DMI 2.0; PCIe 3.0	Up to dual channel DDR3-1600
Xeon E3	1105Cv2	4 (8)	1.8 GHz	—N/a	—N/a		8 MB	25 W	2013-09-10	$320	BGA; 1284	DMI 2.0; PCIe 3.0	Up to dual channel DDR3-1600

Suffixes to denote:

- L – Low power
- C – Embedded applications
- W – Optimized for workstations

=== Mobile processors ===
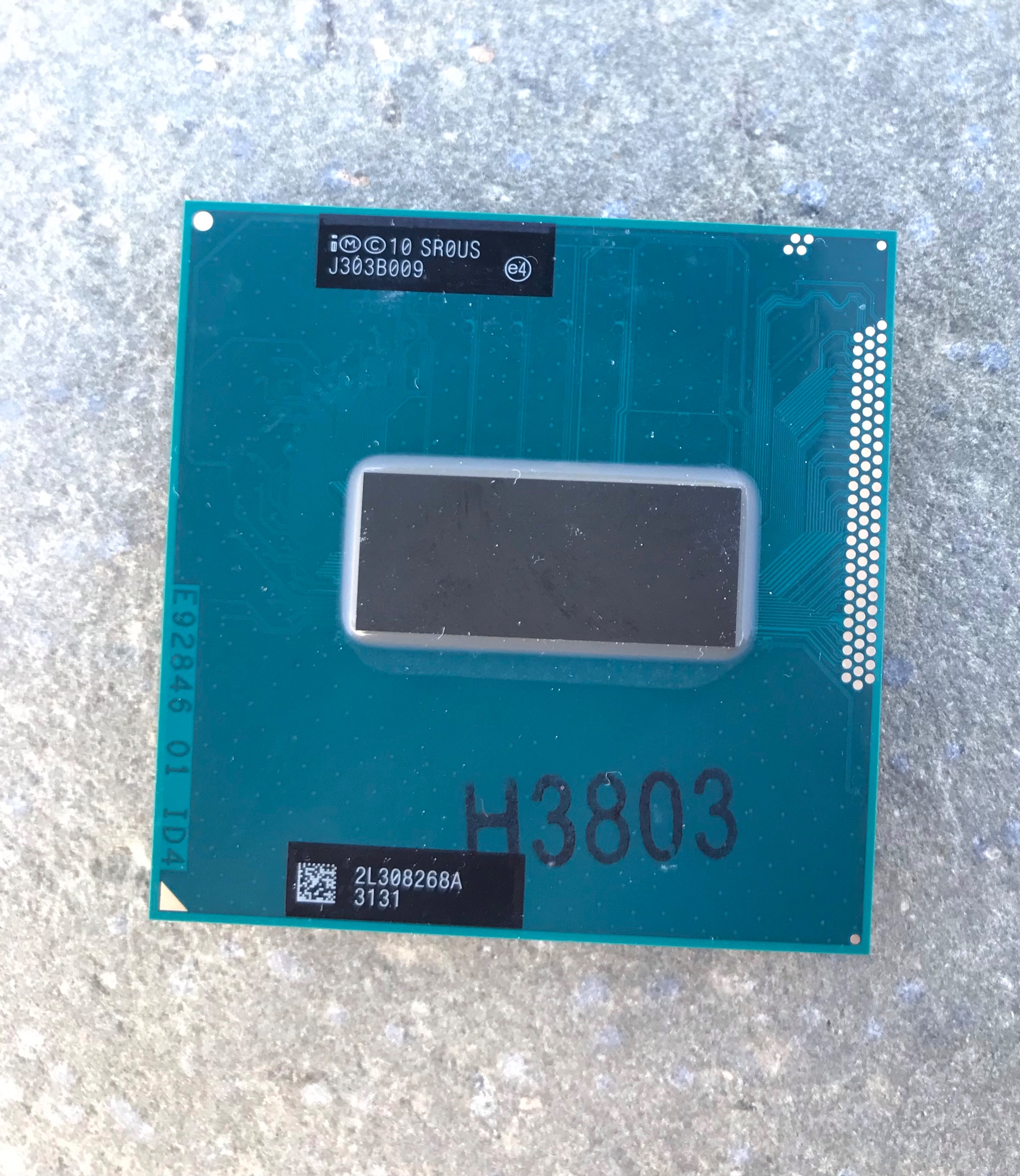
i7-3940XM

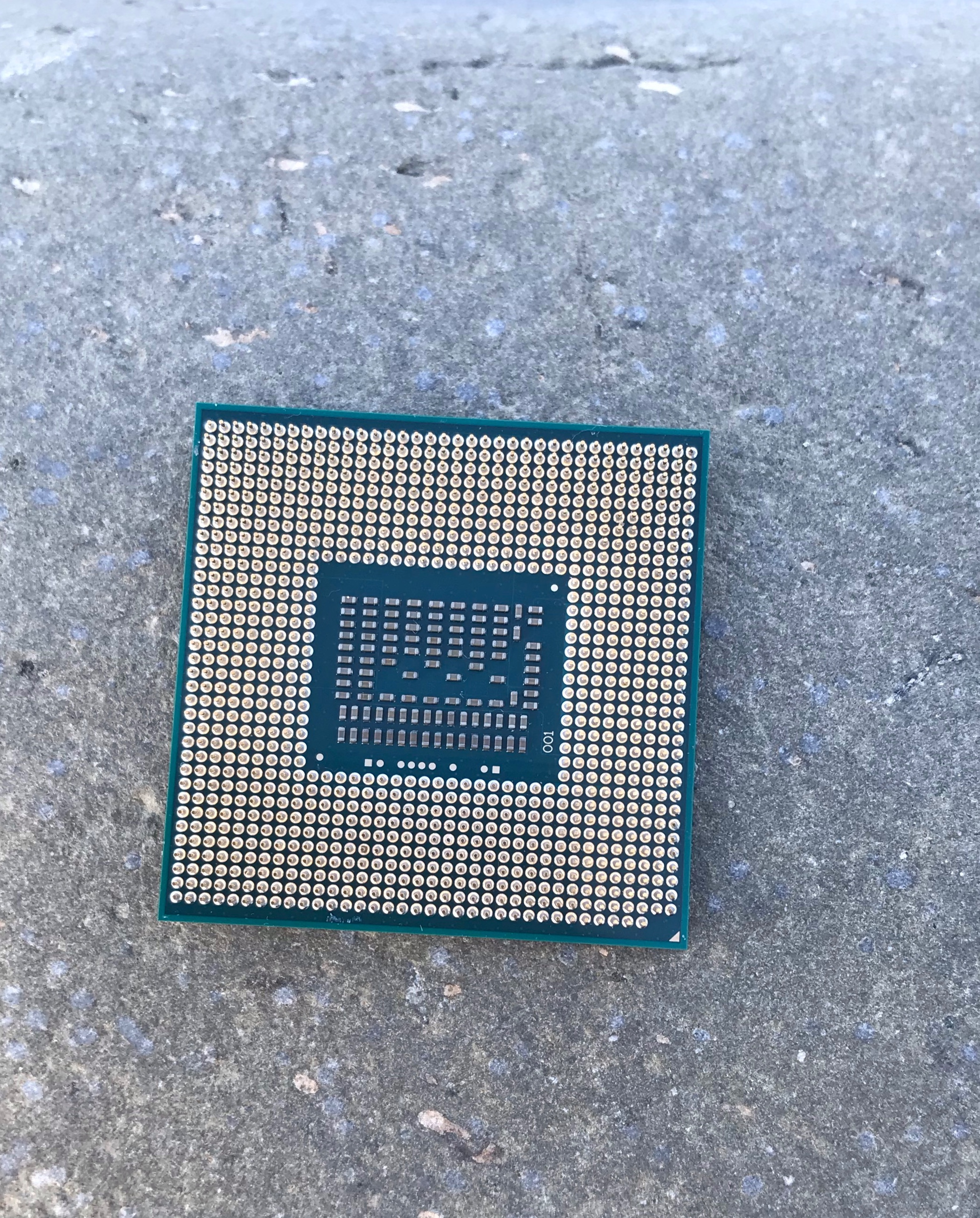
i7-3940XM

Processor branding and model		Cores (threads)	Programmable TDP				CPU Turbo	GPU clock rate		L3 cache	Release date	Price (USD)
Processor branding and model		Cores (threads)	SDP	cTDP down	Nominal TDP	cTDP up	1-core	Normal	Turbo	L3 cache	Release date	Price (USD)
Core i7 Extreme	**3940XM**	4 (8)	—N/a	45 W / ? GHz	55 W / 3.0 GHz	65 W / ? GHz	3.9 GHz	650 MHz	1350 MHz	8 MB	2012-09-30	$1096
Core i7 Extreme	**3920XM**	4 (8)	—N/a	45 W / ? GHz	55 W / 2.9 GHz	65 W / ? GHz	3.8 GHz	650 MHz	1300 MHz	8 MB	2012-04-23	$1096
Core i7	**3840QM**	4 (8)	—N/a	—N/a	45 W / 2.8 GHz	—N/a	3.8 GHz	650 MHz	1300 MHz	8 MB	2012-09-30	$568
Core i7	**3820QM**	4 (8)	—N/a	—N/a	45 W / 2.7 GHz	—N/a	3.7 GHz	650 MHz	1250 MHz	8 MB	2012-04-23	$568
Core i7	**3740QM**	4 (8)	—N/a	—N/a	45 W / 2.7 GHz	—N/a	3.7 GHz	650 MHz	1300 MHz	6 MB	2012-09-30	$378
Core i7	**3720QM**	4 (8)	—N/a	—N/a	45 W / 2.6 GHz	—N/a	3.6 GHz	650 MHz	1250 MHz	6 MB	2012-04-23	$378
Core i7	**3635QM**	4 (8)	—N/a	—N/a	45 W / 2.4 GHz	—N/a	3.4 GHz	650 MHz	1200 MHz	6 MB	2012-09-30	—N/a
Core i7	**3632QM**	4 (8)	—N/a	—N/a	35 W / 2.2 GHz	—N/a	3.2 GHz	650 MHz	1150 MHz	6 MB	2012-09-30	$378
Core i7	**3630QM**	4 (8)	—N/a	—N/a	45 W / 2.4 GHz	—N/a	3.4 GHz	650 MHz	1150 MHz	6 MB	2012-09-30	$378
Core i7	**3615QM**	4 (8)	—N/a	—N/a	45 W / 2.3 GHz	—N/a	3.3 GHz	650 MHz	1200 MHz	6 MB	2012-04-23	$378
Core i7	**3612QM**	4 (8)	—N/a	—N/a	35 W / 2.1 GHz	—N/a	3.1 GHz	650 MHz	1100 MHz	6 MB	2012-04-23	$378
Core i7	**3610QM**	4 (8)	—N/a	—N/a	45 W / 2.3 GHz	—N/a	3.3 GHz	650 MHz	1100 MHz	6 MB	2012-04-23	$378
Core i7	**3689Y**	2 (4)	7 W / ? GHz	10 W / ? GHz	13 W / 1.5 GHz	—N/a	2.6 GHz	350 MHz	850 MHz	4 MB	2013-01-07	$362
Core i7	**3687U**	2 (4)	—N/a	14 W / ? GHz	17 W / 2.1 GHz	25 W / 3.1 GHz	3.3 GHz	350 MHz	1200 MHz	4 MB	2013-01-20	$346
Core i7	**3667U**	2 (4)	—N/a	14 W / ? GHz	17 W / 2.0 GHz	25 W / 3.0 GHz	3.2 GHz	350 MHz	1150 MHz	4 MB	2012-06-03	$346
Core i7	**3537U**	2 (4)	—N/a	14 W / ? GHz	17 W / 2.0 GHz	25 W / 2.9 GHz	3.1 GHz	350 MHz	1200 MHz	4 MB	2013-01-20	$346
Core i7	**3555LE**	2 (4)	—N/a	—N/a	25 W / 2.5 GHz	—N/a	3.2 GHz	550 MHz	1000 MHz	4 MB	2012-06-03	$360
Core i7	**3540M**	2 (4)	—N/a	—N/a	35 W / 3.0 GHz	—N/a	3.7 GHz	650 MHz	1300 MHz	4 MB	2013-01-20	$346
Core i7	**3525M**	2 (4)	—N/a	—N/a	35 W / 2.9 GHz	—N/a	3.6 GHz	650 MHz	1350 MHz	4 MB	Q3 2012	
Core i7	**3520M**	2 (4)	—N/a	—N/a	35 W / 2.9 GHz	—N/a	3.6 GHz	650 MHz	1250 MHz	4 MB	2012-06-03	$346
Core i7	**3517U**	2 (4)	—N/a	14 W / ? GHz	17 W / 1.9 GHz	25 W / 2.8 GHz	3.0 GHz	350 MHz	1150 MHz	4 MB	2012-06-03	$346
Core i7	**3517UE**	2 (4)	—N/a	14 W / ? GHz	17 W / 1.7 GHz	25 W / 2.6 GHz	2.8 GHz	350 MHz	1000 MHz	4 MB	2012-06-03	$330
Core i5	**3610ME**	2 (4)	—N/a	—N/a	35 W / 2.7 GHz	—N/a	3.3 GHz	650 MHz	950 MHz	3 MB	2012-06-03	$276
Core i5	**3439Y**	2 (4)	7 W / ? GHz	10 W / ? GHz	13 W / 1.5 GHz	—N/a	2.3 GHz	350 MHz	850 MHz	3 MB	2013-01-07	$250
Core i5	**3437U**	2 (4)	—N/a	14 W / ? GHz	17 W / 1.9 GHz	25 W / 2.4 GHz	2.9 GHz	650 MHz	1200 MHz	3 MB	2013-01-20	$225
Core i5	**3427U**	2 (4)	—N/a	14 W / ? GHz	17 W / 1.8 GHz	25 W / 2.3 GHz	2.8 GHz	350 MHz	1150 MHz	3 MB	2012-06-03	$225
Core i5	**3380M**	2 (4)	—N/a	—N/a	35 W / 2.9 GHz	—N/a	3.6 GHz	650 MHz	1250 MHz	3 MB	2013-01-20	$266
Core i5	**3365M**	2 (4)	—N/a	—N/a	35 W / 2.8 GHz	—N/a	3.5 GHz	650 MHz	1350 MHz	3 MB	Q3 2012	
Core i5	**3360M**	2 (4)	—N/a	—N/a	35 W / 2.8 GHz	—N/a	3.5 GHz	650 MHz	1200 MHz	3 MB	2012-06-03	$266
Core i5	**3340M**	2 (4)	—N/a	—N/a	35 W / 2.7 GHz	—N/a	3.4 GHz	650 MHz	1250 MHz	3 MB	2013-01-20	$225
Core i5	**3339Y**	2 (4)	7 W / ? GHz	10 W / ? GHz	13 W / 1.5 GHz	—N/a	2.0 GHz	350 MHz	850 MHz	3 MB	2013-01-07	$250
Core i5	**3337U**	2 (4)	—N/a	14 W / ? GHz	17 W / 1.8 GHz	—N/a	2.7 GHz	350 MHz	1100 MHz	3 MB	2013-01-20	$225
Core i5	**3320M**	2 (4)	—N/a	—N/a	35 W / 2.6 GHz	—N/a	3.3 GHz	650 MHz	1200 MHz	3 MB	2012-06-03	$225
Core i5	**3317U**	2 (4)	—N/a	14 W / ? GHz	17 W / 1.7 GHz	—N/a	2.6 GHz	350 MHz	1050 MHz	3 MB	2012-06-03	$225
Core i5	**3230M**	2 (4)	—N/a	—N/a	35 W / 2.6 GHz	—N/a	3.2 GHz	650 MHz	1100 MHz	3 MB	2013-01-20	$225
Core i5	**3210M**	2 (4)	—N/a	—N/a	35 W / 2.5 GHz	—N/a	3.1 GHz	650 MHz	1100 MHz	3 MB	2012-06-03	$225
Core i3	**3229Y**	2 (4)	7 W / ? GHz	10 W / ? GHz	13 W / 1.4 GHz	—N/a	—N/a	350 MHz	850 MHz	3 MB	2013-01-07	$250
Core i3	**3227U**	2 (4)	—N/a	14 W / ? GHz	17 W / 1.9 GHz	—N/a	—N/a	350 MHz	1100 MHz	3 MB	2013-01-20	$225
Core i3	**3217U**	2 (4)	—N/a	14 W / ? GHz	17 W / 1.8 GHz	—N/a	—N/a	350 MHz	1050 MHz	3 MB	2012-06-24	$225
Core i3	**3217UE**	2 (4)	—N/a	14 W / ? GHz	17 W / 1.6 GHz	—N/a	—N/a	350 MHz	900 MHz	3 MB	July 2013	$261
Core i3	**3130M**	2 (4)	—N/a	—N/a	35 W / 2.6 GHz	—N/a	—N/a	650 MHz	1100 MHz	3 MB	2013-01-20	$225
Core i3	**3120M**	2 (4)	—N/a	—N/a	35 W / 2.5 GHz	—N/a	—N/a	650 MHz	1100 MHz	3 MB	2012-09-30	$225
Core i3	**3120ME**	2 (4)	—N/a	—N/a	35 W / 2.4 GHz	—N/a	—N/a	650 MHz	900 MHz	3 MB	July 2013	$225
Core i3	**3110M**	2 (4)	—N/a	—N/a	35 W / 2.4 GHz	—N/a	—N/a	650 MHz	1000 MHz	3 MB	2012-06-24	$225
Core i3	3115C	2 (4)	—N/a	—N/a	25 W / 2.5 GHz	—N/a	—N/a	—N/a		4 MB	2013-09-10	$241
Pentium	B925C	2 (4)	—N/a	—N/a	15 W / 2.0 GHz	—N/a	—N/a	—N/a		4 MB	2013-09-10	OEM
Pentium	A1018	2 (2)	—N/a	—N/a	35 W / 2.1 GHz	—N/a	—N/a	650 MHz	1000 MHz	1 MB	June 2013	$86 (India)
Pentium	2030M	2 (2)	—N/a	—N/a	35 W / 2.5 GHz	—N/a	—N/a	650 MHz	1100 MHz	2 MB	2013-01-20	$134
Pentium	2020M	2 (2)	—N/a	—N/a	35 W / 2.4 GHz	—N/a	—N/a	650 MHz	1100 MHz	2 MB	2012-09-30	$134
Pentium	2127U	2 (2)	—N/a	—N/a	17 W / 1.9 GHz	—N/a	—N/a	350 MHz	1100 MHz	2 MB	2013-06-09	$134
Pentium	2117U	2 (2)	—N/a	—N/a	17 W / 1.8 GHz	—N/a	—N/a	350 MHz	1000 MHz	2 MB	2012-09-30	$134
Pentium	2129Y	2 (2)	7 W	—N/a	10 W / 1.1 GHz	—N/a	—N/a	350 MHz	850 MHz	2 MB	2013-01-07	$150
Celeron	1019Y	2 (2)	7 W	—N/a	10 W / 1.0 GHz	—N/a	—N/a	350 MHz	800 MHz	2 MB	April 2013	$153
Celeron	1020E	2 (2)	—N/a	—N/a	35 W / 2.2 GHz	—N/a	—N/a	650 MHz	1000 MHz	2 MB	2013-01-20	$86
Celeron	1020M	2 (2)	—N/a	—N/a	35 W / 2.1 GHz	—N/a	—N/a	650 MHz	1000 MHz	2 MB	2013-01-20	$86
Celeron	1005M	2 (2)	—N/a	—N/a	35 W / 1.9 GHz	—N/a	—N/a	650 MHz	1000 MHz	2 MB	2013-06-09	$86
Celeron	1000M	2 (2)	—N/a	—N/a	35 W / 1.8 GHz	—N/a	—N/a	650 MHz	1000 MHz	2 MB	2013-01-20	$86
Celeron	1037U	2 (2)	—N/a	—N/a	17 W / 1.8 GHz	—N/a	—N/a	350 MHz	1000 MHz	2 MB	2013-01-20	$86
Celeron	1017U	2 (2)	—N/a	—N/a	17 W / 1.6 GHz	—N/a	—N/a	350 MHz	1000 MHz	2 MB	2013-06-09	$86
Celeron	1007U	2 (2)	—N/a	—N/a	17 W / 1.5 GHz	—N/a	—N/a	350 MHz	1000 MHz	2 MB	2013-01-20	$86
Celeron	1047UE	2 (2)	—N/a	—N/a	17 W / 1.4 GHz	—N/a	—N/a	350 MHz	900 MHz	2 MB	2013-01-20	$134
Celeron	927UE	1 (1)	—N/a	—N/a	17 W / 1.5 GHz	—N/a	—N/a	350 MHz	900 MHz	1 MB	2013-01-20	$107

Suffixes to denote:

- Y – Fanless Ultrabook: Dual-core extreme ultra-low power (TDP 13 W, SDP 7 W)
- U – Fanned Ultrabook: Dual-core ultra-low power (TDP 17 W)
- C – Communications
- M – Dual-core
- QM – Quad-core
- XM – Quad-core extreme performance (adjustable CPU ratio with no ratio limit)
- ME – Dual-core embedded

== Roadmap ==
Intel demonstrated the Haswell architecture in September 2011, which began release in 2013 as the successor to Sandy Bridge and Ivy Bridge.

== Fixes ==
Microsoft has released a microcode update for selected Sandy Bridge and Ivy Bridge CPUs for Windows 7 and up that addresses stability issues. The update, however, negatively impacts Intel G3258 and 4010U CPU models.

== See also ==
- List of Intel CPU microarchitectures

== Notes ==
Atom (ULV)		Node name	Pentium/Core						
Microarch.	Step	Node name	Microarch.	Step					
		600 nm	P6	Pentium Pro (133 MHz)					
		500 nm	P6	Pentium Pro (150 MHz)					
		350 nm	P6	Pentium Pro (166–200 MHz)					
		350 nm	P6	Klamath					
		250 nm	P6	Deschutes					
		250 nm	P6	Katmai	NetBurst				
		180 nm	P6	Coppermine	Willamette				
		130 nm	P6	Tualatin	Northwood				
		130 nm	Pentium M (P6)	Banias	Northwood		NetBurst(HT)		NetBurst(×2)
		90 nm	Pentium M (P6)	Dothan	Prescott	⇨	Prescott‑2M	⇨	Smithfield
		90 nm	Pentium M (P6)	Dothan	~~Tejas~~	→	⇩	→	~~Cedarmill (Tejas)~~
		65 nm	Pentium M (P6)	Yonah	~~Nehalem (NetBurst)~~		Cedar Mill	⇨	Presler
		65 nm	Core	Merom	4 cores on mainstream desktop, DDR3 introduced				
Bonnell	Bonnell	45 nm	Core	Penryn					
Bonnell	Bonnell	45 nm	Nehalem	Nehalem	HT reintroduced, integrated MC, PCH; L3-cache introduced, 256 KB L2-cache/core				
Bonnell	Saltwell	32 nm	Nehalem	Westmere	Introduced GPU on same package and AES-NI				
Bonnell	Saltwell	32 nm	Sandy Bridge	Sandy Bridge	On-die ring bus, no more non-UEFI motherboards				
Silvermont	Silvermont	22 nm	Sandy Bridge	Ivy Bridge					
Silvermont	Silvermont	22 nm	Haswell	Haswell	Fully integrated voltage regulator				
Silvermont	Airmont	14 nm	Haswell	Broadwell					
Silvermont	Airmont	14 nm	Skylake	Skylake	DDR4 introduced on mainstream desktop				
Goldmont		14 nm	Skylake	Kaby Lake					
Goldmont		14 nm	Skylake	Coffee Lake	6 cores on mainstream desktop				
Goldmont		14 nm	Skylake	Amber Lake	Mobile-only				
Goldmont Plus		14 nm	Skylake	Whiskey Lake	Mobile-only				
Goldmont Plus		14 nm	Skylake	Coffee Lake Refresh	8 cores on mainstream desktop				
Goldmont Plus		14 nm	Skylake	Comet Lake	10 cores on mainstream desktop				
Goldmont Plus		14 nm	Sunny Cove	Cypress Cove (Rocket Lake)	Backported Sunny Cove microarchitecture for 14 nm				
Tremont		10 nm	Skylake	Palm Cove (Cannon Lake)	Mobile-only				
Tremont		10 nm	Sunny Cove	Sunny Cove (Ice Lake)	512 KB L2-cache/core				
Tremont		10 nm	Sunny Cove	Willow Cove (Tiger Lake)	X^{e} graphics engine				
Gracemont		Intel 7 (10 nm ESF)	Golden Cove	Golden Cove (Alder Lake)	Hybrid, DDR5, PCIe 5.0				
Gracemont		Intel 7 (10 nm ESF)	Golden Cove	Raptor Cove (Raptor Lake)					
Crestmont		Intel 4	Redwood Cove	Meteor Lake	Mobile-only; NPU, chiplet architecture				
Crestmont		Intel 3	Redwood Cove	Arrow Lake-U					
Skymont		TSMC N3B	Lion Cove	Lunar Lake	Low power mobile only (9–30 W)				
Skymont		TSMC N3B	Lion Cove	Arrow Lake					
Darkmont		Intel 18A	Cougar Cove	Panther Lake					
Arctic Wolf		Intel 18A and/or TSMC N2P	Coyote Cove	Nova Lake					
