= HP EliteBook =

Line of high-end laptops from Hewlett-Packard

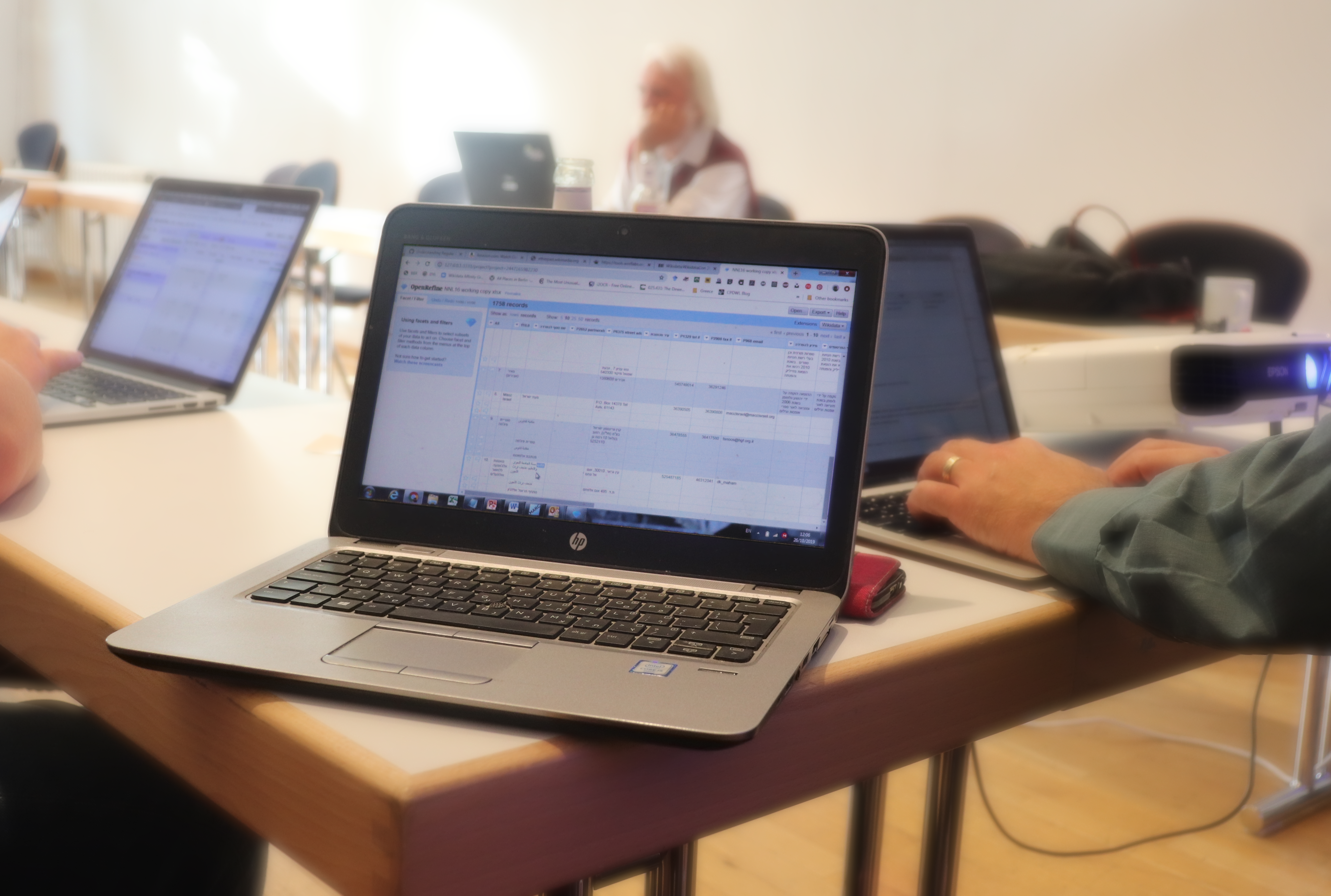
- HP Elitebook 820 G4
- Developer: Hewlett-Packard (2008–2015); HP Inc. (2015–present)
- Manufacturer: Hewlett-Packard (2008–2015); HP Inc. (2015–present)
- Type: Laptop, Mobile workstation
- Released: August 11, 2008; 18 years ago
- Operating system: Windows
- CPU: AMD, Intel
- Display: Up to 17.3"
- Graphics: AMD, Nvidia, Intel
- Platform: Elite
- Marketing target: Business
- Predecessor: HP Compaq p and w series
- Related: HP ProBook, HP ZBook

HP EliteBook is a line of business-oriented high-end laptop computers originally produced by Hewlett-Packard and later by its successor, HP Inc., marketed as a high-end line positioned above the ProBook series. The line was introduced in August 2008 as a replacement to the HP Compaq line of business laptops, and initially included mobile workstations until September 2013, when they were rebranded as HP ZBook. The EliteBook mainly competes against laptop computers such as Acer's TravelMate, Asus's ExpertBook, Dell's Latitude, Lenovo's ThinkPad and Toshiba's Portégé.

== Features ==
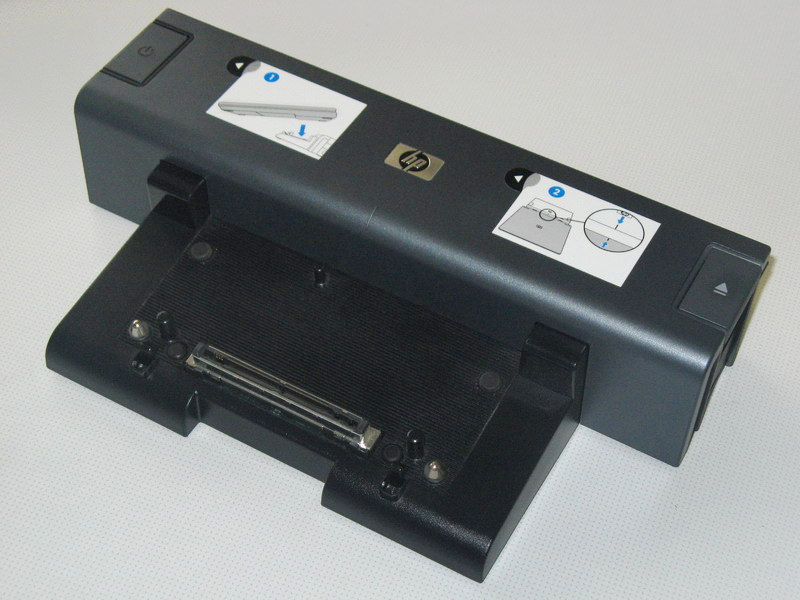
2012's ProBook/EliteBook docking station

The HP EliteBook line is engineered to meet military MIL-STD-810 standards for reliability and performance under extreme conditions, namely for temperature, altitude, humidity, dust, shock and vibration. The notebooks feature a magnesium alloy chassis, anodized aluminum lid and palm rests, spill-resistant keyboards, active hard-drive protection and dual pointing devices (touchpad and pointing stick). Earlier EliteBook models featured the HP Night Light keyboard light, while in subsequent generations HP has added a backlit keyboard option to some 15" and 17" workstation models. Select models have SSD storage options.

== History ==
Announcements:

- 2008: August 11: 8530p, 8530w and 8730w; August 18: 2530p and 2730p; September 8: 6930p announced
- 2010: January 6: 8440p, 8440w, 8540p and 8540w; March 1: 2540p and 2740p; March 24: 8740w announced
- 2011: February 23: 8460p and 8560p; April 12: 8460w, 8560w and 8760w; May 9: 2560p and 2760p announced
- 2012: May 9: 2170p, 2570p, 8470p and 8570p, 8470w, 8570w and 8770w, Folio 9470m announced
- 2013: October 1: 820^{G1}, 840^{G1} and 850^{G1}; December 10: Folio 1040^{G1} announced
- 2014: June 4: 725^{G2}, 745^{G2} and 755^{G2}; December 2: 720, 740, 750, 820^{G2}, 840^{G2}, 850^{G2} and Folio 1020 announced
- 2015: September 29: 725^{G3}, 745^{G3} and 755^{G3} announced
- 2016: January 5: 820^{G3}, Folio^{G1}, 840^{G3}, 1040^{G3} and 850^{G3} announced.
- 2020: January 5: HP Elite Dragonfly^{G2}; May 26: EliteBook 830^{G7}, x360 830^{G7}, 840^{G7}, 850^{G7}, 835^{G7}, 845^{G7}, 855^{G7}, x360 1030^{G7} and x360 1040^{G7} announced. December 7: EliteBook 830^{G8}, x360 830^{G8}, 840^{G8}, 850^{G8}

Release history of EliteBook laptops 2008–2018
Screen	Type	**30 2008	**40 2010	**60 2011	**70 2012	2013		2014		2015		2016	2017		2018	
Screen	Type	intel	intel	intel	intel	intel	AMD	intel	AMD	intel	AMD	intel	intel	AMD	intel	AMD
17.3"	Mobile workstation	8730w	8740w	8760w	8770w	replaced by ZBook 17 G1										
15.4"; 15.6"	Mobile workstation	8530w	8540w	8560w	8570w	replaced by ZBook 15 G1										
15.4"; 15.6"	Ultraportable (ultrabook)														1050^{G1}	
15.4"; 15.6"	Mainstream	8530p	8540p	8560p	8570p	850^{G1}		850^{G2}		850^{G3}		850^{G4}			850^{G5}	
15.4"; 15.6"	Mainstream					750^{G1}	755^{G1}	750^{G2}	755^{G2}	750^{G3}	755^{G3}			755^{G4}		755^{G5}
14"	Ultraportable (ultrabook)				Folio 9470m	Folio; 9480m	replaced by Folio 1040 G1									
14"	Ultraportable (ultrabook)					Folio 1040^{G1}		Folio 1040^{G2}				Folio 1040^{G3}	Folio 1040^{G4}			
14"	Ultraportable (ultrabook)							1040^{G1}		1040^{G2}		1040^{G3}	1040^{G4}			
14"	2-in-1 flipbook														x360 1040^{G5}	
14"	Mobile workstation		8440w	8460w	8470w	replaced by ZBook 14u G1										
14"	Mainstream	6930p	8440p	8460p	8470p	840^{G1}		840^{G2}		840^{G3}		840^{G4}			840^{G5} 840r^{G4}	
14"	Mainstream					740^{G1}	745^{G1}	740^{G2}	745^{G2}		745^{G3}			745^{G4}		745^{G5}
13.3"	2-in-1 flipbook												x360 1030^{G2}		x360 1030^{G3}	
13.3"	2-in-1 tablet														Elite x2 1013^{G3}	
13.3"	Ultraportable (ultrabook)											1030^{G1}				
13.3"	Mainstream														830^{G5}	
13.3"	Mainstream															735^{G5}
12.1" 12.5"	Ultraportable (ultrabook)	2530p	2540p	2560p	2570p	820^{G1}		820^{G2}		820^{G3}		820^{G4}				
12.1" 12.5"	Ultraportable (ultrabook)							1020^{G1}		Folio 1020^{G1}		Folio^{G1}				
12.1" 12.5"	Ultraportable (ultrabook)					720^{G1}	725^{G1}	720^{G2}	725^{G2}		725^{G3}			725^{G4}		
12.1" 12.5"	2-in-1 flipbook												x360 1020^{G2}			
12.1" 12.5"	2-in-1 tablet									HP Elite 1011 x2		Elite x2 1012^{G1}	Elite x2 1012^{G2}			
11.6"	2-in-1 convertible	2730p	2740p	2760p	Revolve 810^{G1}	Revolve^{G2}				Revolve 810^{G3}						
11.6"	Ultraportable (ultrabook)				2170p											

== Models ==
Laptop color codes

Processor

Socketed desktop processor
Socketed mobile processor
Soldered high power processor
Soldered standard power processor
Soldered low power processor
Soldered ultra low power processor

Weight

0.9 kg (2.0 lb)	Up to 0.91 kg
1.0 kg (2.2 lb)	0.92–1.0 kg
1.1 kg (2.4 lb)	1.01–1.1 kg
1.2 kg (2.6 lb)	1.11–1.2 kg
1.3 kg (2.9 lb)	1.21–1.3 kg
1.4 kg (3.1 lb)	1.31–1.4 kg
1.5 kg (3.3 lb)	1.41–1.5 kg
1.6 kg (3.5 lb)	1.51–1.6 kg
1.7 kg (3.7 lb)	1.61–1.7 kg
1.8 kg (4.0 lb)	1.71–1.81 kg
1.9 kg (4.2 lb)	1.81–1.91 kg
2.0 kg (4.4 lb)	1.91–2.03 kg
2.1 kg (4.6 lb)	2.04–2.14 kg
2.3 kg (5.1 lb)	2.15–2.4 kg
2.5 kg (5.5 lb)	2.41–2.75 kg
2.8 kg (6.2 lb)	2.76–3.05 kg
3.1 kg (6.8 lb)	3.06–3.42 kg
3.5 kg (7.7 lb)	3.43–3.99 kg
4.0 kg (8.8 lb)	4.0–4.99 kg
5.5 kg (12 lb)	5.0–6.49 kg
7.2 kg (16 lb)	6.5–7.99 kg
9.1 kg (20 lb)	8.0–9.99 kg
10.7 kg (24 lb)	10–11.99 kg
12.7 kg (28 lb)	12–14.49 kg
14.5 kg (32 lb)	14.5–17.99 kg
18.1 kg (40 lb)	18–20.99 kg
21.7 kg (48 lb)	21–23.99 kg
24 kg (53 lb)	24–28.99 kg
29.5 kg (65 lb)	29 kg and above

Screen resolution

4K or higher
1440p+ (WQHD, QXGA)
1080p+ (Full HD, UXGA)
Better than 768p (SXGA,SXGA+)
600p+ (SVGA, HD, XGA, HD+)
Up to 600p (VGA)

Graphics

Dual standard socket graphics option
Dual proprietary socket graphics option
Standard socket graphics option
Proprietary socket graphics option
Soldered performance graphics option
Soldered midrange graphics option
Soldered mainstream graphics option
Soldered entry graphics option
Integrated entry graphics
Integrated basic graphics

Laptop storage combinations (excluding WWAN slot)

Level	PCIe 4.0 x4	PCIe 3.0 x4	PCIe 3.0 x2	M.2 SATA	mSATA	1.8" SATA	2.5" SATA	1.8" IDE	2.5" IDE
	2019; Not yet (laptops)	2013	2013	2013	2009	2003	2003	1991	1988
	3						2		
	4								
	3						1		
	2						2		
	3					2			
	3								
	2						1		
	4								
	3					1			
	2					2			
	2								
	1						1		
	3								
	2					1			
	1								
	2								
	1					1			
			2				1		
							4		
		1							
			1				1		
							3		
			1						
				1			1		
					1		1		
						1	1		
							2		
									3
						1			
							1		
									2
								1	
									1

Laptop memory

Amount	LPDDR5X	LPDDR5	DDR5	LPDDR4X	LPDDR4	DDR4	LPDDR3	DDR4	DDR3L		DDR3		DDR2		DDR	SDR	EDO	FPM
Amount						dual channel		< dual channel	dual channel	< dual channel	dual channel	< dual channel	dual channel	< dual channel				
Amount	2022 (laptops)	2019 (laptops)	2020	2017	2014	2014	2012	2014	2010		2007		2003		1998	1993	1993	1987
max memory = 512 GB	N/A	N/A	512 GB	N/A	N/A	N/A	N/A	N/A	N/A	N/A	N/A	N/A	N/A	N/A	N/A	N/A	N/A	N/A
max memory = 256 GB	N/A		256 GB (4 slots)	N/A	N/A	N/A	N/A	N/A	N/A	N/A	N/A	N/A	N/A	N/A	N/A	N/A	N/A	N/A
max memory = 128 GB	128 GB		128 GB	N/A	N/A	128 GB (4 slots)	N/A	N/A	N/A	N/A	N/A	N/A	N/A	N/A	N/A	N/A	N/A	N/A
64 GB ≤ max memory < 128 GB		64 GB		N/A	N/A	64 GB	N/A	64 GB (2 slots)	64 GB (4 slots)	N/A	N/A	N/A	N/A	N/A	N/A	N/A	N/A	N/A
32 GB ≤ max memory < 64 GB				32 GB	32 GB	32 GB	N/A		32 GB	32 GB (2 slots)	32 GB (4 slots)	N/A	N/A	N/A	N/A	N/A	N/A	N/A
16 GB ≤ max memory < 32 GB						16 GB	16 GB		16 GB		16 GB	16 GB (2 slots)	16 GB (4 slots)	N/A	N/A	N/A	N/A	N/A
8 GB ≤ max memory < 16 GB						8 GB			8 GB		8 GB		8 GB	8 GB (2 slots)	8 GB (4 slots)	N/A	N/A	N/A
4 GB ≤ max memory < 8 GB						4 GB			4 GB		4 GB		4 GB		4 GB	4 GB (4 slots)	4 GB (4 slots)	N/A
2 GB ≤ max memory < 4 GB						2 GB (8 chips)			2 GB		2 GB		2 GB			2 GB	2 GB	N/A
1 GB ≤ max memory < 2 GB			1 GB (1 chip)	dual channel min	dual channel min	N/A		single channel min	1 GB		1 GB		1 GB					1 GB (4 slots)
512 MB ≤ max memory < 1 GB	N/A	N/A	N/A	single channel min	single channel min	N/A	dual channel min	half channel min	512 MB (8 chips)		512 MB (8 chips)		512 MB					512 MB
256 MB ≤ max memory < 512 MB	N/A	N/A	N/A	256 MB (1 chip)	256 MB (1 chip)	N/A	single channel min	256 MB (1 chip)	N/A	single channel min	N/A	single channel min	256 MB					
128 MB ≤ max memory < 256 MB	N/A	N/A	N/A	N/A	N/A	N/A	128 MB (1 chip)	N/A	N/A	half channel min	N/A	half channel min						
64 MB ≤ max memory < 128 MB	N/A	N/A	N/A	N/A	N/A	N/A	N/A	N/A	N/A	64 MB (1 chip)	N/A	64 MB (1 chip)						
max memory < 64 MB	N/A	N/A	N/A	N/A	N/A	N/A	N/A	N/A	N/A	N/A	N/A	N/A						

The Core 2-based EliteBook series was the xx30 series. Before that, HP Compaq p- and w-class (professional and workstation, respectively) notebooks were not branded as EliteBooks, nor did they have the EliteBooks' distinctive anodized aluminum styling.

=== Zeroth generation ===
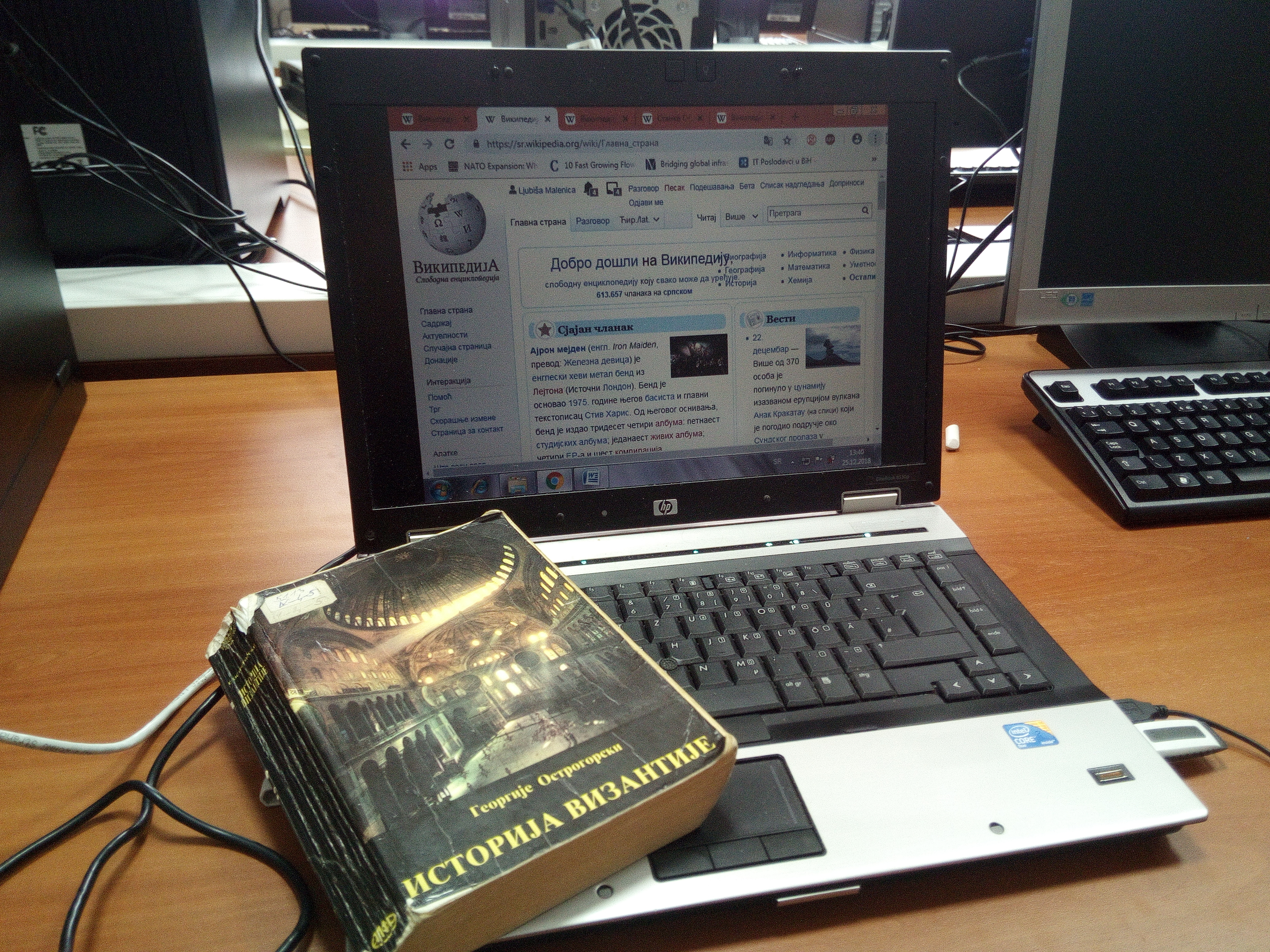
EliteBook 8530p

The xx30 generation comprised the following notebooks:

- 2530p: 12.1" professional ultraportable
- 2730p: 12.1" professional tablet PC
- 6930p: 14.1" professional laptop
- 8530p: 15.4" professional laptop
- 8530w: 15.4" mobile workstation
- 8730w: 17.0" mobile workstation

All models used Core 2 CPUs and 16:10 aspect ratio displays. The 6930p model was notable for being claimed by HP to be the first notebook to break the 24-hour battery life barrier.

Zeroth generation specifications
Model	Platform	Dimensions	Weight ^{(min)}	CPU	Chipset	Graphics	Memory (max)	Storage	Wireless	Audio	Screen	Battery	Operating system
2530p	Penryn	25.2 × 282.3 × 214.3 mm	1.45 kg (3.2 lb)	up to Intel Core 2 Duo SL9600 (2 x 2.13 GHz)	Mobile Intel GS45 Express	Intel GMA 4500MHD	8 GB DDR2-800 (2 slots)	80/120 GB 5400 RPM 1.8" SATA HDD; 120 GB 5400 RPM 2.5" SATA HDD, or 160 GB 7200 RPM 2.5" SATA HDD (with HP 3D DriveGuard); 80 GB SSD	up to Intel WiFi Link 5100 (802.11a/b/g/n, 300 Mbit/s)	High Definition Audio with integrated speaker, stereo headphone/line out, stereo microphone in, and dual-microphone array	16:10 aspect ratio 12.1" LED, WXGA (1280x800)		Windows Vista Business; Windows Vista Home Basic; Windows Vista Business with downgrade to Windows XP Professional; Windows Vista Enterprise
2730p	Penryn	28.2 × 290 × 212 mm	1.7 kg (3.7 lb)	up to Intel Core 2 Duo SL9600 (2 x 2.13 GHz)	Mobile Intel GS45 Express	Intel GMA 4500MHD	8 GB DDR2-800 (2 slots)		up to Intel WiFi Link 5100 (802.11a/b/g/n, 300 Mbit/s)		16:10 aspect ratio 12.1" LED, WXGA (1280x800), with digitizer		Windows Vista Business; Windows Vista Business with downgrade to Windows XP Tablet Edition; Windows Vista Enterprise
6930p	Penryn	31.3 × 331.0 × 243.0 mm	2.1 kg (4.6 lb)	up to Intel Core 2 Duo T9900 (3.06 GHz)	Intel GM45; Intel PM45	Intel GMA 4500MHD or ATI Mobility Radeon HD 3450	8 GB DDR2-800 (2 slots)		up to Intel WiFi Link 5300 (802.11a/b/g/n, 450 Mbit/s)		16:10 aspect ratio 14.1" CCFL-backlit, up to WXGA+ (1440x900); 14.1" LED, WXGA (1280x800)		
8530p	Penryn	28.2 × 355 × 263.5 mm	2.86 kg (6.3 lb)	up to Intel Core 2 Duo T9800 (2.93 GHz)	Intel PM45	ATI Mobility Radeon HD 3650	8 GB DDR2-800 (2 slots)		up to Intel WiFi Link 5300 (802.11a/b/g/n, 450 Mbit/s)		16:10 aspect ratio 15.4" CCFL-backlit, up to WUXGA (1920x1200)		
8530w	Penryn	28.2 × 255 × 263.5 mm	2.86 kg (6.3 lb)	up to Intel Core 2 Extreme QX9300 (2.53 GHz)	Intel PM45	MXM: NVIDIA Quadro FX 770M; ATI Mobility FireGL V5700	8 GB DDR2-800 (2 slots)		up to Intel WiFi Link 5300 (802.11a/b/g/n, 450 Mbit/s)		16:10 aspect ratio 15.4" CCFL-backlit, up to WUXGA (1920x1200)		
8730w	Penryn	32 × 393 × 282 mm	3.4 kg (7.5 lb)	up to Intel Core 2 Extreme QX9300 (2.53 GHz)	Intel PM45	MXM: NVIDIA Quadro; FX 3700M/ FX 2700M; ATI Mobility FireGL V5725	8 GB DDR2-800 (2 slots)		up to Intel WiFi Link 5300 (802.11a/b/g/n, 450 Mbit/s)		16:10 aspect ratio 17.0" CCFL-backlit, up to WUXGA (1920x1200); 17.0" CCFL-backlit DreamColor IPS, WUXGA (1920x1200)		

=== First generation ===
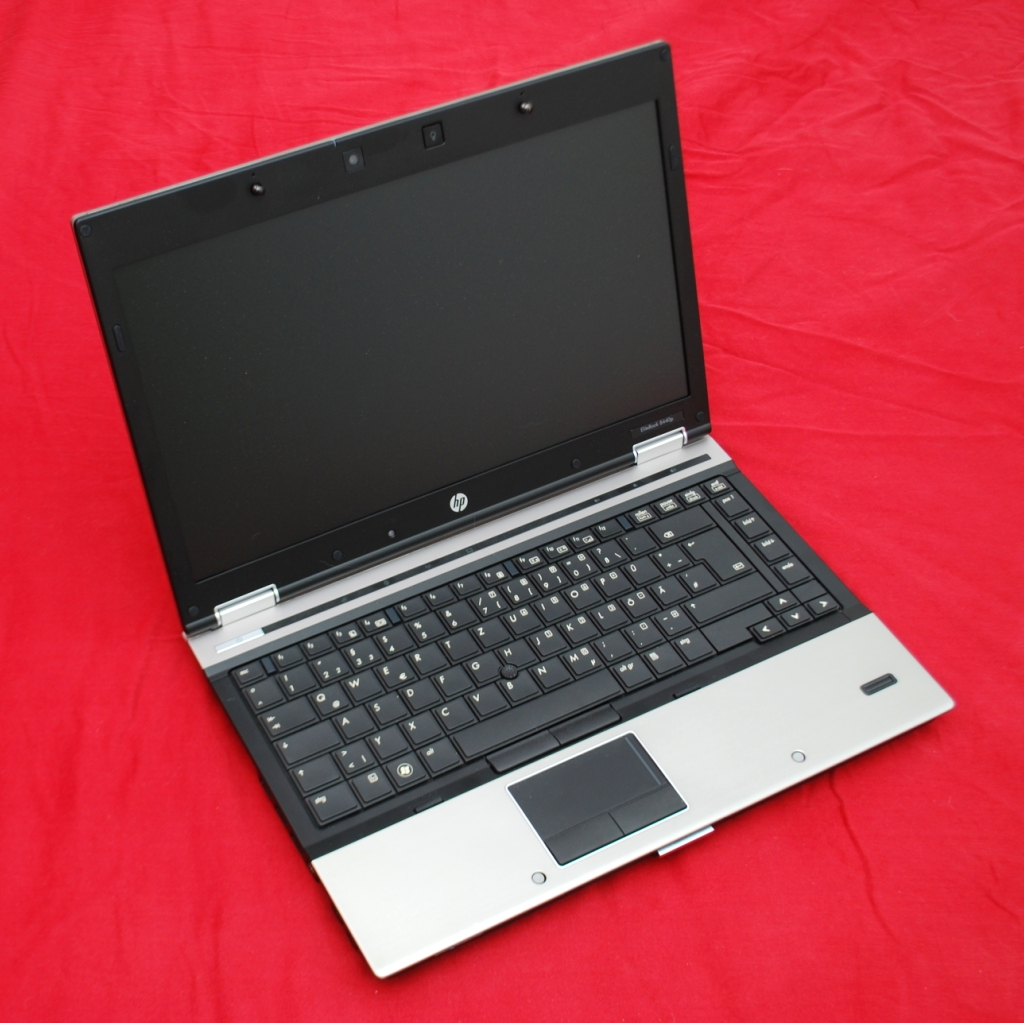
EliteBook 8440p

The xx40 series comprised the following models:

- 2540p: 12.1" professional ultraportable
- 2740p: 12.1" professional tablet PC
- 8440p: 14.0" professional laptop
- 8440w: 14.0" mobile workstation
- 8540p: 15.6" professional laptop
- 8540w: 15.6" mobile workstation
- 8740w: 17.0" mobile workstation

The xx40 series brought several changes and new features, including upgrading to the new Intel Core i5 and Core i7 processors and DDR3 SDRAM, new semi-chiclet keyboard and for the 14.0" and 15.6" models the switch from 16:10 to 16:9 displays. HP also added DisplayPort and USB 3.0 ports. Appearance-wise, the workstation models were changed to a darker "gunmetal" finish while the non-workstation models retained the brighter "silver" finish.

Models with quad-core CPUs supported up to 32 GB of RAM. Workstation models could be configured with ISV-certified professional graphics cards such as the ATI Mobility FirePro M7820 or the Nvidia Quadro FX 5000M that at the time of release it was the most powerful workstation-class graphics card on the market.

First generation (2008–2009) specifications
Model	Platform	Dimensions	Weight ^{(min)}	CPU	Chipset	Graphics	Memory (max)	Storage	Wireless	Audio	Screen	Battery	Operating system
2540p	Nehalem	28 × 282.2 × 213.4 mm	1.53 kg (3.4 lb)	up to Intel Core i7-660LM (2 x 2.26 GHz)	Intel QM57	Intel HD Graphics with dynamic frequency	8 GB DDR3-1333 (1 slot)	160 GB SATA SSD	up to Intel Advanced-N 6200 (802.11a/b/g/n, 300 Mbit/s)	High Definition Audio (HP Premier Sound) with integrated speakers and dual-microphone array	16:10 aspect ratio 12.1" LED, WXGA (1280x800)	HP 9-cell 93 WHr Li-Ion Primary Battery; HP 6-cell 62 WHr Li-Ion Primary Battery; HP Long Life 6-cell 55 WHr Li-Ion Primary Battery	Windows Vista/7
2740p	Nehalem	31.7 × 290 × 212 mm (1.25 x 11.42 x 8.35 in)	1.72 kg (3.8 lb)	up to Intel Core i7-640M (2 x 2.80 GHz)	Intel QM57	Intel HD Graphics with dynamic frequency	8 GB DDR3-1333 (2 slots)	160/250 GB 5400 RPM Smart SATA II HD, 320 GB 5400 RPM HDD or 80/160 GB SSD	up to Intel Advanced-N 6200 (802.11a/b/g/n, 300 Mbit/s)		16:10 aspect ratio 12.1" LED, WXGA (1280x800) with digitizer and optional multi-touch		
8440p	Nehalem	31.3 × 335.6 × 236.2 mm	2.12 kg (4.7 lb)	up to Intel Core i7-740QM (4 x 1.73 GHz)	Intel QM57	Intel GMA HD; Option + Nvidia NVS 3100M	16 GB (Note: 16 GB only with quad-core CPU, dual-core i5 can support only 8 GB) DDR3-1333 (2 slots)		up to Intel Ultimate-N 6300 (802.11a/b/g/n, 450 Mbit/s)		14.0" LED, up to HD+ (1600x900)		
8440w	Nehalem	31.3 × 335.6 × 236.2 mm	2.24 kg (4.9 lb)	up to Intel Core i7-840QM (4 x 1.86 GHz)	Intel QM57	Intel GMA HD + NVIDIA Quadro FX 380M	16 GB DDR3-1333 (2 slots)		up to Intel Ultimate-N 6300 (802.11a/b/g/n, 450 Mbit/s)		14.0" LED, up to HD+ (1600x900)		
8540p	Nehalem	32.4 × 373.5 × 251.5 mm	2.89 kg (6.4 lb)	up to Intel Core i7-840QM (4 x 1.86 GHz)	Intel QM57	Intel GMA HD + MXM; Nvidia NVS 5100M	16 GB DDR3-1333 (2 slots)		up to Intel Ultimate-N 6300 (802.11a/b/g/n, 450 Mbit/s)		15.6" LED, up to FHD (1920x1080)		
8540w	Nehalem	32.4 × 373.5 × 251.5 mm	2.89 kg (6.4 lb)	up to Intel Core i7-840QM (4 x 1.86 GHz)	Intel QM57	Intel GMA HD + MXM; NVIDIA Quadro; FX 1800M/ FX 880M; ATI FirePro M5800	32 GB DDR3-1333 (4 slots)		up to Intel Ultimate-N 6300 (802.11a/b/g/n, 450 Mbit/s)		15.6" LED, up to FHD (1920x1080); 15.6" LED DreamColor IPS, FHD (1920x1080)		
8740w	Nehalem	36.5 × 397.5 × 285.5 mm	3.57 kg (7.9 lb)	up to Intel Core i7-920XM (4 x 2.00 GHz)	Intel QM57	Intel GMA HD + MXM; NVIDIA Quadro; 5000M/ 3800M/ 2800M; ATI FirePro M7820	32 GB DDR3-1333 (4 slots)		up to Intel Ultimate-N 6300 (802.11a/b/g/n, 450 Mbit/s)		16:10 aspect ratio 17.0" LED, up to WUXGA (1920x1200); 17.0" LED DreamColor IPS, WUXGA (1920x1200)		

=== Second generation ===
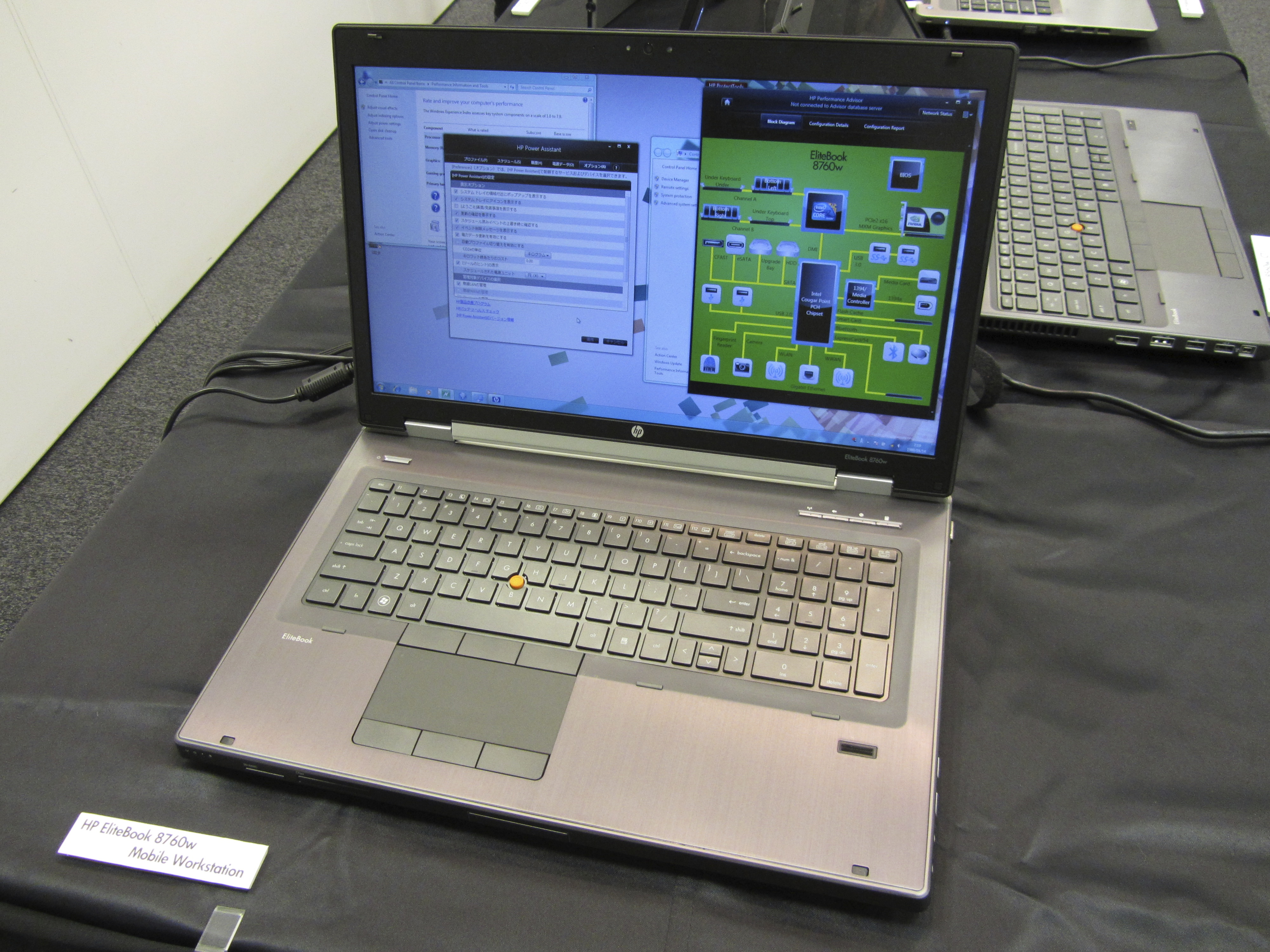
EliteBook 8760w workstation

The xx60 series, announced on February 23, 2011, comprised the following models:

- 2560p: 12.5" professional ultraportable
- 2760p: 12.1" professional tablet PC
- 8460p: 14.0" professional laptop
- 8460w: 14.0" mobile workstation
- 8560p: 15.6" professional laptop
- 8560w: 15.6" mobile workstation
- 8760w: 17.3" mobile workstation

The xx60 series featured second-generation Intel Core i series processors, a choice of Sandy Bridge integrated or AMD Radeon HD 6470M discrete graphics, and chiclet-style keyboards. All models except the 2760p used 16:9 displays. Mobile workstation models featured Nvidia Quadro or AMD FirePro graphics. The notebooks were also completely redesigned, with a more boxy shape and less plastic used on the surfaces, as well as a larger glass touchpad. The multiple access panels on the bottom of the notebooks were replaced with a single panel enabling access to all of the internal components.

The 8460p model was claimed to have battery life in excess of 32 hours using an external ultra-capacity battery.

Second generation (2010) specifications
Model	Platform	Dimensions	Weight ^{(min)}	CPU	Chipset	Graphics	Memory (max)	Storage	Wireless	Audio	Screen	Battery	Operating system
2560p	Sandy Bridge	27.4 × 305.2 × 209 mm	1.67 kg (3.7 lb)	up to Intel Core i7-2620M (2 x 2.7 GHz)	Intel QM67	Intel HD Graphics 3000	16 GB DDR3-1333 (2 slots)		up to Intel Ultimate-N 6300 (802.11a/b/g/n, 450 Mbit/s)	SRS Premium Sound with integrated stereo speakers and dual-microphone array	12.5" LED, HD (1366×768)	9-cell (100 WHr) Li-Ion; 6-cell (62 WHr) Li-Ion; 3-cell (31 WHr) Li-Ion; HP Long Life 6-cell (55 WHr) Li-Io	Windows 7 Professional
2760p	Sandy Bridge	32.3 × 290 × 212 mm	1.8 kg (4.0 lb)	up to Intel Core i7-2620M (2 x 2.7 GHz)	Intel QM67	Intel HD Graphics 3000	16 GB DDR3-1333 (2 slots)		up to Intel Advanced-N 6205 (802.11a/b/g/n, 300 Mbit/s)		16:10 aspect ratio 12.1" LED, WXGA (1280x800) with digitizer and multitouch		
8460p	Sandy Bridge	31.8 × 338 × 231.3 mm	2.07 kg (4.6 lb)	up to Intel Core i7-2720QM (2 x 2.2 GHz)	Intel QM67	Intel HD Graphics 3000; Option + AMD Radeon HD 6470M	16 GB DDR3-1333 (2 slots)		up to Intel Ultimate-N 6300 (802.11a/b/g/n, 450 Mbit/s)		14.0" LED, up to HD+ (1600x900)		
8460w	Sandy Bridge	31.8 × 338 × 231.3 mm	2.22 kg (4.9 lb)	up to Intel Core i7-2820QM (2 x 2.3 GHz)	Intel QM67	Intel HD 3000 + AMD FirePro M3900	16 GB DDR3-1333 (2 slots)		up to Intel Ultimate-N 6300 (802.11a/b/g/n, 450 Mbit/s)		14.0" LED, up to HD+ (1600x900)		
8560p	Sandy Bridge	34.1 × 374 × 250.5 mm	2.73 kg (6.0 lb)	up to Intel Core i7-2860QM (2 x 2.5 GHz)	Intel QM67	Intel HD 3000; Option + AMD Radeon HD 6470M	16 GB DDR3-1333 (2 slots)		up to Intel Ultimate-N 6300 (802.11a/b/g/n, 450 Mbit/s)		15.6" LED, up to FHD (1920x1080)		
8560w	Sandy Bridge	34.5 × 382 × 257.5 mm	3.0 kg (6.6 lb)	up to Intel Core i7-2820QM (2 x 2.3 GHz)	Intel QM67	Intel + MXM; NVIDIA Quadro; 2000M/ 1000M; AMD FirePro M5950	32 GB DDR3-1333 (2 or 4 slots)		up to Intel Ultimate-N 6300 (802.11a/b/g/n, 450 Mbit/s)		15.6" LED, up to FHD (1920x1080); 15.6" LED DreamColor IPS, FHD (1920x1080)		
8760w	Sandy Bridge	37.4 × 416.5 × 272.7 mm	3.47 kg (7.7 lb)	up to Intel Core i7-2920XM (4 x 2.5 GHz)	Intel QM67	Intel + MXM; NVIDIA Quadro; 5010M/ 4000M/ 3000M; AMD FirePro M5950	32 GB DDR3-1333 (4 slots)		up to Intel Ultimate-N 6300 (802.11a/b/g/n, 450 Mbit/s)		17.3" LED, up to FHD (1920x1080); 17.3" LED DreamColor IPS, FHD (1920x1080)		

=== Third generation ===
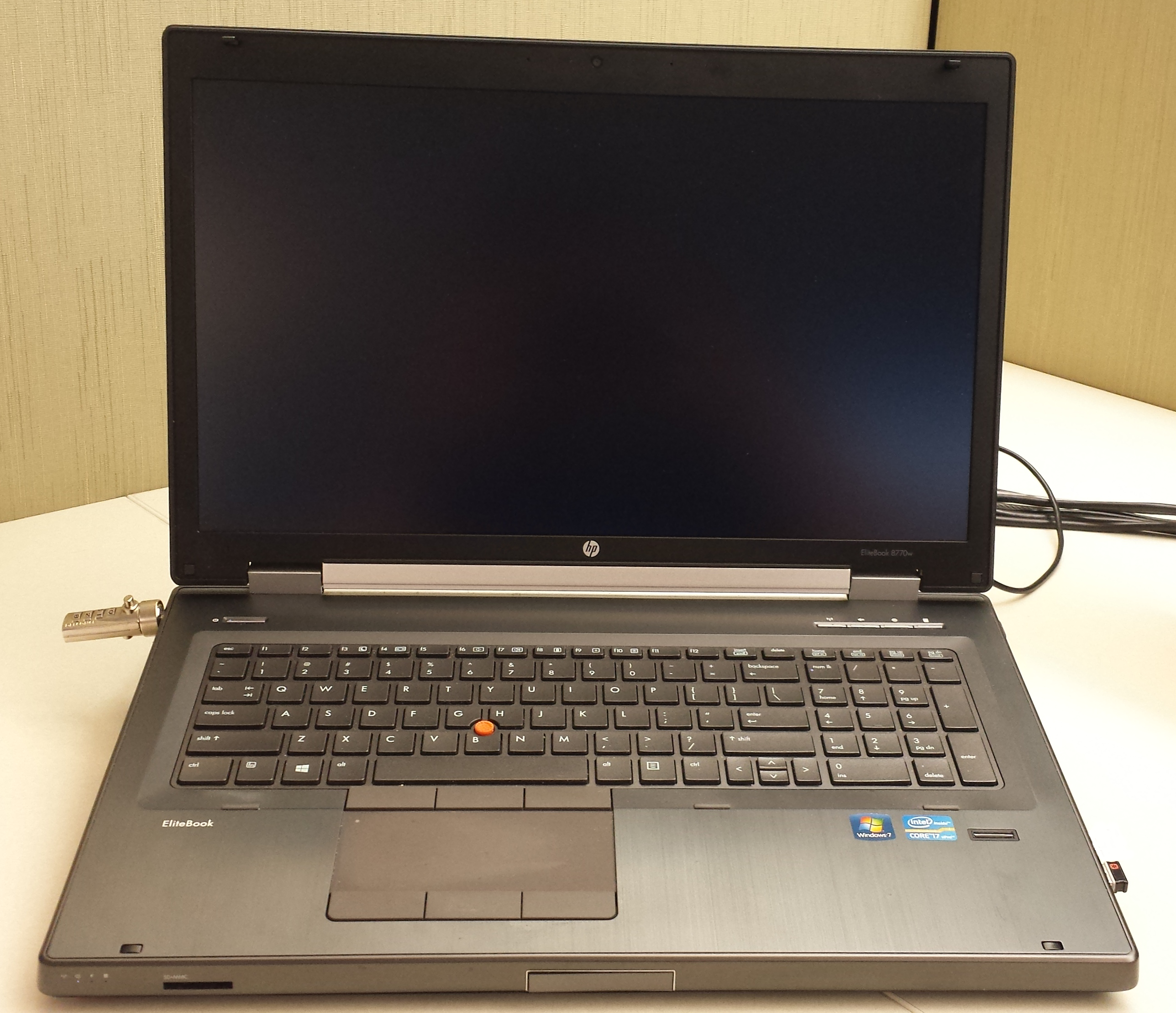
An Elitebook 8770w, mounted in a dock

The Third generation, announced on May 9, 2012, comprised the following models:

- Revolve 810: 11.6" professional tablet PC
- 2170p: 11.6" professional ultraportable
- 2570p: 12.5" professional laptop
- 8470p: 14.0" professional laptop
- 8470w: 14.0" mobile workstation
- Folio 9470m: 14.0" ultrabook
- 8570p: 15.6" professional laptop
- 8570w: 15.6" mobile workstation
- 8770w: 17.3" mobile workstation

The xx70 series was largely an incremental update to the previous xx60 series, updated with Intel Ivy Bridge processors and new integrated and discrete graphics processors. New additions to the EliteBook family included the 11.6" 2170p and the 14.0" Folio 9470m ultrabook.

ElitePad 900 G1 was introduced to this generation in October 2012.

Third generation (2011) specifications
Model	Platform	Dimensions	Weight ^{(min)}	CPU	Chipset	Graphics	Memory (max)	Storage	Wireless	Audio	Screen	Battery	Operating system
Revolve 810	Ivy Bridge	22.2 × 285 × 212 mm	1.4 kg (3.1 lb)	up to Intel Core i7-3687U (2 x 2.1 GHz)	Intel QM77	Intel HD Graphics 4000	12 GB DDR3L-1600 (4 GB soldered, 1 slot)	256 GB mSATA SSD	up to Intel Advanced-N 6205 (802.11a/b/g/n, 300 Mbit/s)	DTS Studio Sound with integrated stereo speakers and microphone (dual-microphone array), headphone/microphone combo jack and buttons for volume up and down	11.6" LED, HD (1366×768) with digitizer and multi-touch	44 WHr	Windows 7 Professional
2170p	Ivy Bridge	26.5 × 292 × 192 mm	1.33 kg (2.9 lb)	up to Intel Core i7-3687U (2 x 2.1 GHz)	Intel QM77	Intel HD Graphics 4000	16 GB DDR3L-1600 (2 slots)		up to Intel Advanced-N 6205 (802.11a/b/g/n, 300 Mbit/s)	SRS Premium Sound PRO with integrated stereo speakers and dual-microphone array and combo headphone/microphone jack	11.6" LED, HD (1366×768)		
2570p	Ivy Bridge	27 × 305 × 209 mm	1.63 kg (3.6 lb)	up to Intel Core i7-3540M (3.0 GHz)	Intel QM77	Intel HD Graphics 4000	16 GB DDR3L-1600 (2 slots)		up to Intel Advanced-N 6205 (802.11a/b/g/n, 300 Mbit/s)		12.5" LED, HD (1366×768)		
8470p	Ivy Bridge	34 × 338 × 231 mm	2.07 kg (4.6 lb)	up to Intel Core i7-3740QM (4 x 2.70 GHz)	Intel QM77	Intel HD 4000; Option + AMD Radeon HD 7570M	16 GB DDR3L-1600 (2 slots)		up to Intel Ultimate-N 6300 (802.11a/b/g/n, 450 Mbit/s)		14.0" LED, up to HD+ (1600x900)		
8470w	Ivy Bridge	31.8 × 338 × 231.3 mm	2.25 kg (5.0 lb)	up to Intel Core i7-3840QM (4 x 2.8 GHz)	Intel QM77	Intel HD 4000 + AMD FirePro M2000	16 GB DDR3L-1600 (2 slots)		up to Intel Ultimate-N 6300 (802.11a/b/g/n, 450 Mbit/s)		14.0" LED, up to HD+ (1600x900)		
Folio 9470m	Ivy Bridge	19 × 338 × 231 mm	1.61 kg (3.5 lb)	up to Intel Core i7-3687U (2 x 2.1 GHz)	Intel QM77	Intel HD Graphics 4000	16 GB DDR3L-1600 (2 slots)		up to Intel Advanced-N 6235 (802.11a/b/g/n, Bluetooth 4.0)		14.0" LED, HD+ (1600x900)		
8570p	Ivy Bridge	34 × 374 × 251 mm	2.61 kg (5.8 lb)	up to Intel Core i7-3740QM (4 x 2.70 GHz)	Intel QM77	Intel HD 4000; Option + AMD Radeon HD 7570M	16 GB DDR3L-1600 (2 slots)		up to Intel Ultimate-N 6300 (802.11a/b/g/n, 450 Mbit/s)		15.6" LED, up to FHD (1920x1080)		
8570w	Ivy Bridge	34.5 × 382 × 257.5 mm	3.0 kg (6.6 lb)	up to Intel Core i7-3840QM (4 x 2.8 GHz)	Intel QM77	Intel + MXM; NVIDIA Quadro K2000M/ K1000M; AMD FirePro M4000	32 GB DDR3L-1600 (4 slots)		up to Intel Ultimate-N 6300 (802.11a/b/g/n, 450 Mbit/s)		15.6" LED, up to FHD (1920x1080); 15.6" LED DreamColor IPS, FHD (1920x1080)		
8770w	Ivy Bridge	37.4 × 416.5 × 272.7 mm	3.47 kg (7.7 lb)	up to Intel Core i7-3920XM (4 x 2.9 GHz)	Intel QM77	Intel + MXM; NVIDIA Quadro; K5000M/ K4000M/ K3000M; AMD FirePro M4000	32 GB DDR3L-1600 (4 slots)		up to Intel Ultimate-N 6300 (802.11a/b/g/n, 450 Mbit/s)		17.3" LED, up to FHD (1920x1080); 17.3" LED DreamColor IPS, FHD (1920x1080)		

=== Fourth generation ===
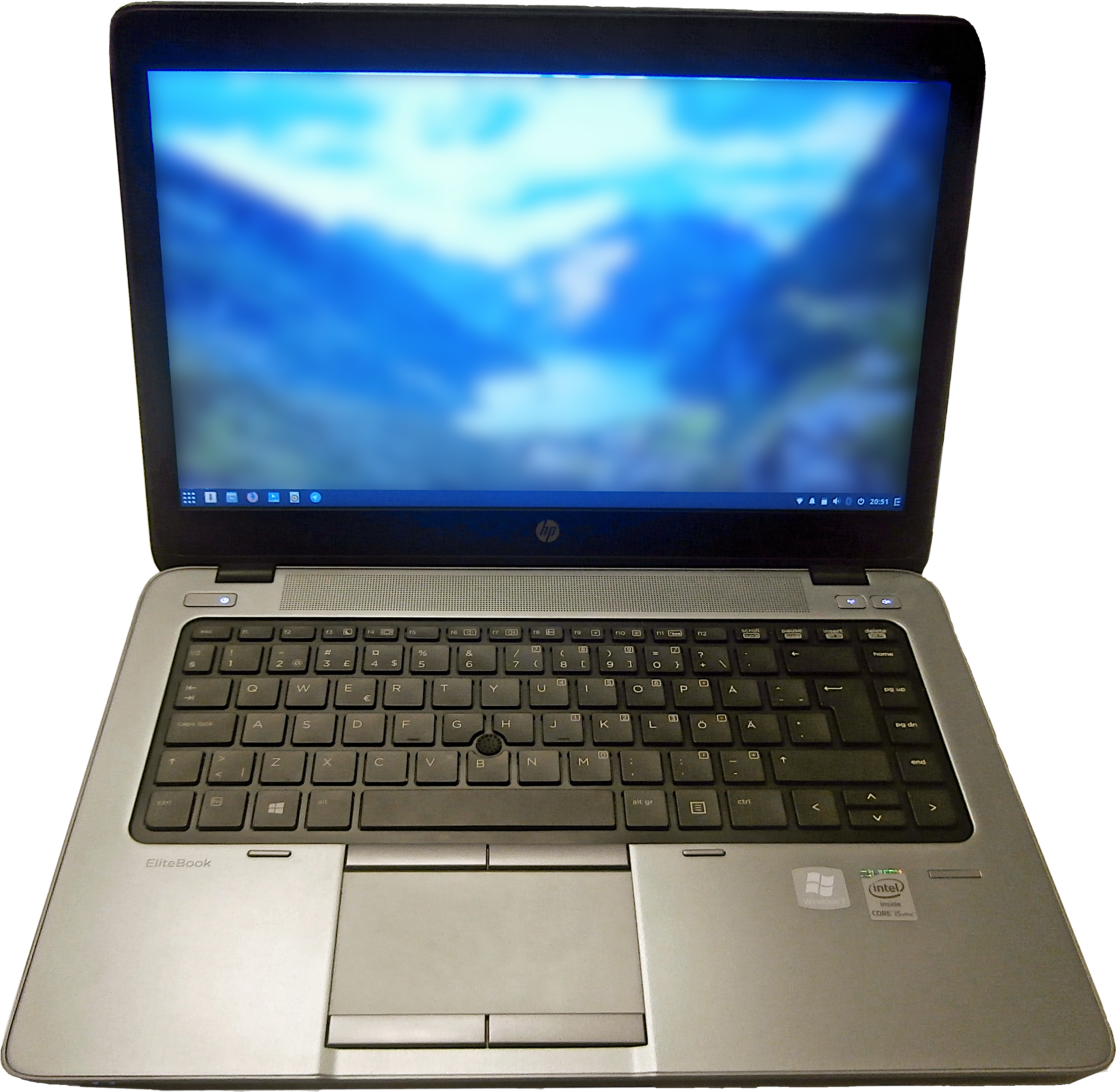
EliteBook 840 G1

This generation of EliteBook notebooks feature the Intel Haswell processors or AMD Steamroller Kaveri processors. EliteBook 800 Series G1 products with Intel processors were announced in October 2013. EliteBook Folio 1040 G1 and Revolve 810 G2 were announced in December 2013. EliteBook 700 Series G1 products with Intel processors and 700 Series G2 products with AMD processors were announced in June 2014. This generation brought changes to nomenclature on most products. Models ending with 0 use Intel processors and models ending with 5 use AMD processor. The second last digit relates to the screen size, and the remaining digits indicate the series. G number indicates the generation of the product. The external design was also refreshed, resulting in a less boxy shape and overall thinner chassis. Workstation models were split into a separate ZBook brand. AMD based models were added into EliteBook product line-up for the first time. Previously, ProBook product line-up had featured AMD APUs.

- EliteBook 720 G1: 12.5" ultraportable with Intel processor
- EliteBook 740 G1: 14.0" mainstream with Intel processor
- EliteBook 750 G1: 15.6" mainstream with Intel processor
- EliteBook 725 G2: 12.5" ultraportable with AMD processor
- EliteBook 745 G2: 14.0" mainstream with AMD processor
- EliteBook 755 G2: 15.6" mainstream with AMD processor
- EliteBook Revolve 810 G2: 11.6" tablet with Intel processor
- EliteBook 820 G1: 12.5" ultraportable with Intel processor
- EliteBook 840 G1: 14.0" mainstream with Intel processor
- EliteBook 850 G1: 15.6" mainstream with Intel processor
- EliteBook Folio 1040 G1: 14.0" ultrabook with Intel processor
- EliteBook Folio 9480m : 14.0" ultrabook with Intel processor

ElitePad 1000 G2 tablet with Intel processors was introduced with this generation. The product was announced at WMC 2014 in February 2014.

- ElitePad 1000 G2: 10.1" tablet with Intel processor

Fourth generation (2012) specifications
Model	Platform	Dimensions	Weight ^{(min)}	CPU	Chipset	Graphics	Memory (max)	Storage	Wireless	Audio	Screen	Battery	Operating system
720 G1		31 x 21.5 x 2.1 cm	1.33 kg (2.9 lb)								12.5" anti-glare flat LED-backlit (1366 x 768)		
740 G1													
750 G1													
820 G1	Haswell	21 × 310 × 215.3 mm	1.33 kg (2.9 lb)	up to Intel Core i7-4600U (2 x 2.1 GHz)		Intel HD Graphics 4400	16 GB DDR3L-1600 (2 slots)		up to Intel Wireless-AC 7260 (802.11ac, Bluetooth 4.0)		12.5" LED, HD (1366×768)		Windows 8
840 G1	Haswell	21 × 338.9 × 237 mm	1.58 kg (3.5 lb)	up to Intel Core i7-4600U (2 x 2.1 GHz)		Intel HD Graphics 4400 Option + AMD Radeon HD 8750M	16 GB DDR3L-1600 (2 slots)	320/500 GB /1 TB 5400 RPM HDD; 320/500 GB 7200 RPM HDD	up to Intel Wireless-AC 7260 (802.11ac, Bluetooth 4.0)	HD Audio with DTS Studio Sound	14.0" LED, up to FHD (1920x1080); 14.0" LED, HD+ (1600x900) touch		Windows 7 Home Premium (32/64 bit); Windows 7 Professional (32/64 bit); Windows 7 Professional 64 (available through downgrade rights from Windows 8 Pro); Windows 8; Windows 8 Pro
850 G1	Haswell	21.4 × 375 × 253 mm	1.88 kg (4.1 lb)	up to Intel Core i7-4600U (2 x 2.1 GHz)		Intel HD Graphics 4400 Option + AMD Radeon HD 8750M	16 GB DDR3L-1600 (2 slots)		up to Intel Wireless-AC 7260 (802.11ac, Bluetooth 4.0)		15.6" LED, up to FHD (1920x1080)		
Revolve 810 G2	Haswell	22.2 × 285 × 212 mm	1.4 kg (3.1 lb)	up to Intel Core i7-4600U (2 x 2.1 GHz)		Intel HD Graphics 4400	12 GB DDR3L-1600 (4 GB soldered. 1 slot)		up to Intel Wireless-AC 7260 (802.11ac, Bluetooth 4.0)		11.6" LED, HD (1366×768) with digitizer and multi-touch		
Folio 1040 G1	Haswell	15.9 × 338 × 233.5 mm	1.49 kg (3.3 lb)	up to Intel Core i7-4600U (2 x 2.1 GHz)		Intel HD Graphics 4400 or HD 5000	12 GB DDR3L-1600 (4GB soldered, 1 slot)		up to Intel Wireless-AC 7260 (802.11ac, Bluetooth 4.0)		14.0" LED, up to FHD (1920x1080); 14.0" LED, FHD (1920x1080) touch		
725 G2	Steamroller	21 × 319 × 215.3 mm	1.36 kg (non-touch); 1.63 kg (touch)	up to AMD A10 Pro-7350B (2.1 GHz)	AMD A76M	AMD Radeon R4, R5, or R6 Graphics	16 GB DDR3L-1600 (2 slots)		up to Broadcom 802.11ac, Bluetooth 4.0		12-5" LED, up to FHD (1920x1080); 12.5" LED, FHD (1920x1080) touch		
745 G2	Steamroller	21 × 339 × 237 mm	1.58 kg (3.5 lb)	up to AMD A10 Pro-7350B (2.1 GHz)	AMD A76M	AMD Radeon R4, R5, or R6 Graphics	16 GB DDR3L-1600 (2 slots)		up to Broadcom 802.11ac, Bluetooth 4.0		14.0" LED, up to FHD (1920x1080); 14.0" LED, FHD (1920x1080) touch		
755 G2	Steamroller	21.5 × 375.5 × 253.6 mm	2 kg (4.4 lb)	up to AMD A10 Pro-7350B (2.1 GHz)	AMD A76M	AMD Radeon R4, R5, or R6 Graphics	16 GB DDR3L-1600 (2 slots)		up to Broadcom 802.11ac, Bluetooth 4.0		15.6" LED, up to FHD (1920x1080); 15.6" LED, FHD (1920x1080) touch		

=== Fifth generation ===
This generation of EliteBook notebooks feature Intel Broadwell processors. EliteBook 700 Series G2, Revolve 810 G3, 800 Series G2, Folio 1020 G1, and Folio 1040 G2 were announced in December 2014. EliteBook Folio 1020 Bang & Olufsen Limited Edition was announced in July 2015.

- EliteBook 720 G2: 12.5" mainstream with Intel processor
- EliteBook 740 G2: 14.0" mainstream with Intel processor
- EliteBook 750 G2: 15.6" mainstream with Intel processor
- EliteBook Revolve 810 G3: 11.6" tablet with Intel processor
- EliteBook 820 G2: 12.5" mainstream with Intel processor
- EliteBook 840 G2: 14.0" mainstream with Intel processor
- EliteBook 850 G2: 15.6" mainstream with Intel processor
- EliteBook Folio 1020 G1 Standard/Special Edition/Bang & Olufsen Limited Edition: 12.5" lightweight with Intel processor
- EliteBook Folio 1040 G2: 14.0" lightweight with Intel processor

HP Elite x2 1011 G1 tablet with Intel processors was introduced with this generation. The product was announced in January 2015.

- Elite x2 1011 G1: 11.6" tablet with Intel processor

Fifth generation (2013–2014) specifications
Model	Platform	Dimensions	Weight ^{(min)}	CPU	Chipset	Graphics	Memory (max)	Storage	Wireless	Audio	Screen	Battery	Operating system
720 G2	Broadwell	21 × 310 × 215.3 mm	1.36 kg (3.0 lb)	up to Intel Core i5-5200U (2 × 2.2 GHz)		Intel HD Graphics 5500	32 GB DDR3L-1600 (2 slots)		up to Intel Wireless-AC 7265 (802.11ac, Bluetooth 4.0)		12.5" LED, up to FHD (1920x1080); 12.5" LED, FHD (1920x1080) touch		
820 G2	Broadwell	21 × 310 × 215.3 mm	1.36 kg (3.0 lb)	up to Intel Core i7-5600U (2 × 2.6 GHz)		Intel HD Graphics 5500	32 GB DDR3L-1600 (2 slots)		up to Intel Wireless-AC 7265 (802.11ac, Bluetooth 4.0)		14" LED, up to FHD (1920x1080); 14" LED, FHD (1920x1080) touch		
740 G2	Broadwell	21 × 339 × 237 mm	1.58 kg (3.5 lb)	up to Intel Core i5-5200U (2 × 2.2 GHz)		Intel HD Graphics 5500	32 GB DDR3L-1600 (2 slots)		up to Intel Wireless-AC 7265 (802.11ac, Bluetooth 4.0)		14.0" LED, up to FHD (1920x1080); 14.0" LED, FHD (1920x1080) touch		
840 G2	Broadwell	21 × 339 × 237 mm	1.55 kg (3.4 lb)	up to Intel Core i7-5600U (2 × 2.6 GHz)		Intel HD Graphics 5500 Option + AMD Radeon R7 M260X	32 GB DDR3L-1600 (2 slots)		up to Intel Wireless-AC 7265 (802.11ac, Bluetooth 4.0)		14.0" LED, up to FHD (1920x1080); 14.0" LED, FHD (1920x1080) touch		
Folio 1040 G2	Broadwell	15.9 × 338 × 233.5 mm	1.51 kg (3.3 lb)	up to Intel Core i7-5650U (2 × 2.2 GHz)		Intel HD Graphics 5500 or HD 6000	20 GB DDR3L-1600 (4GB soldered,1 slot)		up to Intel Wireless-AC 7265 (802.11ac, Bluetooth 4.0)		14.0" LED, up to FHD (1920x1080); 14.0" LED, FHD (1920x1080) touch		
750 G2	Broadwell	21.4 × 375 × 254 mm	1.88 kg (4.1 lb)	up to Intel Core i5-5200U (2 × 2.2 GHz)		Intel HD Graphics 5500	32 GB DDR3L-1600 (2 slots)		up to Intel Wireless-AC 7265 (802.11ac, Bluetooth 4.0)		15.6" LED, up to FHD (1920x1080); 15.6" LED, FHD (1920x1080) touch		
850 G2	Broadwell	21.4 × 375 × 254 mm	1.83 kg (4.0 lb)	up to Intel Core i7-5600U (2 × 2.6 GHz)		Intel HD 5500 Option + AMD Radeon R7 M260X	32 GB DDR3L-1600 (2 slots)		up to Intel Wireless-AC 7265 (802.11ac, Bluetooth 4.0)		15.6" LED, up to FHD (1920x1080); 15.6" LED, FHD (1920x1080) touch		
Folio 1020 G1	Broadwell	15.7 × 310 × 210 mm thick	1 kg (2.2 lb)	up to Intel Core M-5Y71 (1.2 GHz)		Intel HD Graphics 5300	8 GB DDR3L-1600 (soldered)		up to Intel Wireless-AC 7260 (802.11ac, Bluetooth 4.0)		12.5" LED, up to FHD (1920x1080); 12.5" LED, QHD (2560x1440) touch		

=== Sixth generation ===
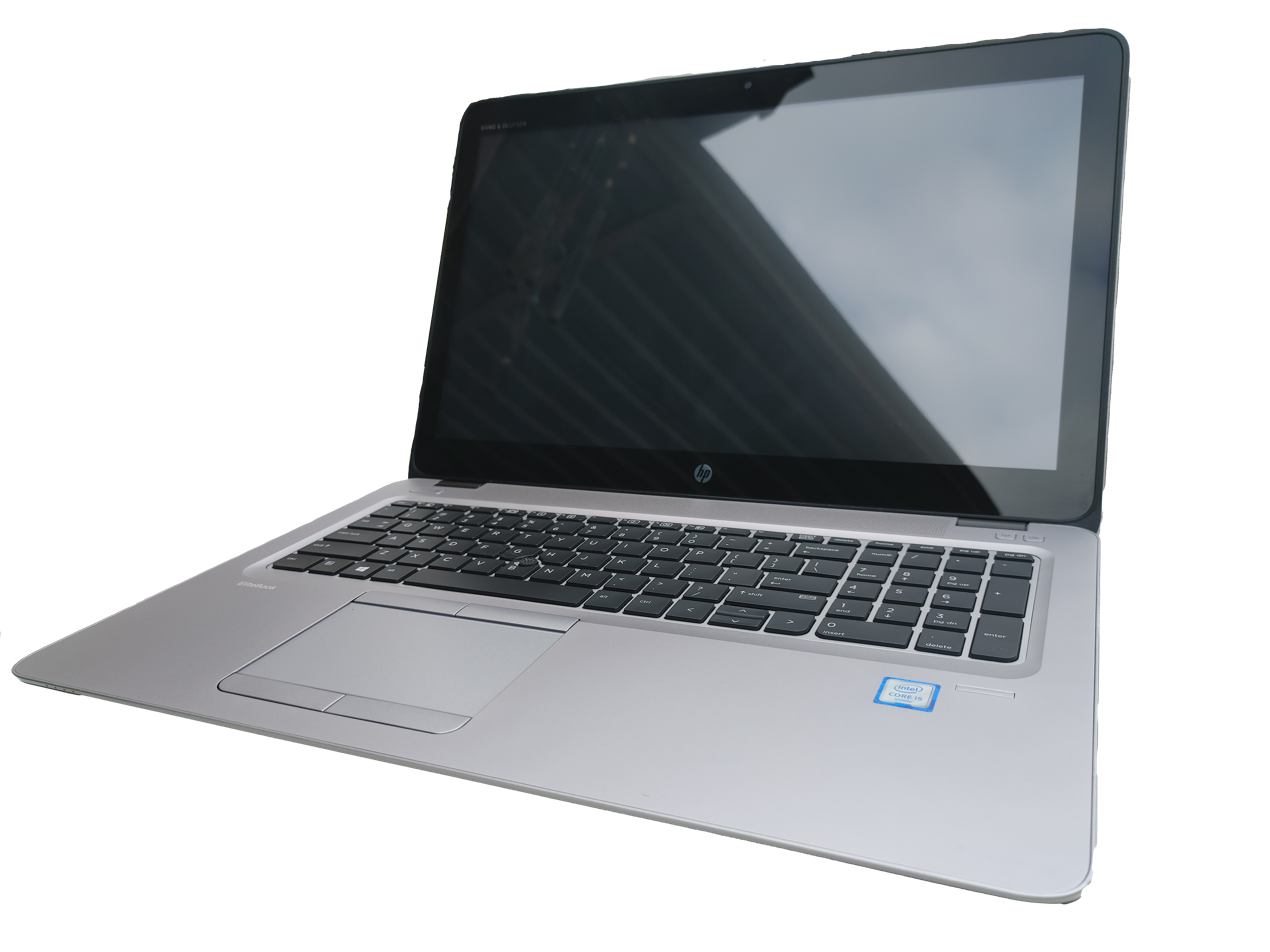
EliteBook 850 G3 equipped with a touch screen

This generation of EliteBook notebooks feature Intel Skylake processors or AMD Excavator Carrizo processors. EliteBook 725 G3, 745 G3, and 755 G3 with AMD processors were announced in September 2015. EliteBook 820 G3, 840 G3, 850 G3, 1040 G3 and Folio G1 with Intel processors were announced at CES 2016 in January 2016. EliteBook 1030 G1 was announced in May 2016.

- EliteBook 725 G3: 12.5" mainstream with AMD processor
- EliteBook 745 G3: 14.0" mainstream with AMD processor
- EliteBook 755 G3: 15.6" mainstream with AMD processor
- EliteBook 820 G3: 12.5" mainstream with Intel processor
- EliteBook 840 G3: 14.0" mainstream with Intel processor
- EliteBook 850 G3: 15.6" mainstream with Intel processor
- EliteBook Folio G1: 12.5" lightweight with Intel processor
- EliteBook 1030 G1: 13.3" lightweight with Intel processor
- EliteBook 1040 G3: 14.0" lightweight with Intel processor

HP Elite x2 1012 G1 tablet with Intel processors was introduced with this generation. The product was announced in November 2015.

- Elite x2 1012 G1: 12.0" tablet with Intel processor

Sixth generation (2015) specifications
Model	Platform	Dimensions	Weight ^{(min)}	CPU	Chipset	Memory	Graphics	Storage	Networking	Audio	Screen	Webcam	Battery	Operating system
EliteBook 725 G3	Excavator	31.1 x 21.89 x 1.89 cm	1.26 kg (2.8 lb)	AMD PRO A8-8600B (4C4T (Note: 2 full-functional cores + 2 float-point) 1.6 GHz) or AMD PRO A10-8700B (4C4T 1.8 GHz) or AMD PRO A12-8800B (4C4T 2.1 GHz)		up to 32 GB DDR4-1600 (2 SODIMM slots)	AMD Radeon R6 Graphics or AMD Radeon R7 Graphics (A12)	one M.2 2280 drive one 2.5" drive	Broadcom 5762 GbE with DASH; Realtek RTL8188EE (802.11n) or Broadcom 943228 WLAN (802.11n Bluetooth 4.0) or Intel Wireless-AC 7265 WLAN (802.11ac Bluetooth 4.2) optional HP hs3110 HSPA+ WWAN or HP lt4120 Qualcomm Snapdragon X5 LTE WWAN optional NXP NPC100 NFC	Bang & Olufsen with integrated dual array microphone, premium speakers, HP Noise Reduction Software and HP Clear Sound Amp	12.5" HD WLED SVA 300:1 60 Hz 220 nits or 12.5" FHD WLED UWVA 600:1 60 Hz 300 nits or 12.5" FHD WLED UWVA 600:1 60 Hz 300 nits touch		44 Wh	
EliteBook 745 G3	Excavator	33.8 x 23.7 x 1.89 cm	1.54 kg (3.4 lb)	AMD PRO A8-8600B (4C4T 1.6 GHz) or AMD PRO A10-8700B (4C4T 1.8 GHz) or AMD PRO A12-8800B (4C4T 2.1 GHz)		up to 32 GB DDR4-1600 (2 SODIMM slots)	AMD Radeon R6 Graphics or AMD Radeon R7 Graphics (A12)	one M.2 2280 drive one 2.5" drive	Broadcom 5762 GbE with DASH; Realtek RTL8188EE (802.11n) or Broadcom 943228 WLAN (802.11n Bluetooth 4.0) or Intel Wireless-AC 7265 WLAN (802.11ac Bluetooth 4.2) optional HP hs3110 HSPA+ WWAN or HP lt4120 Qualcomm Snapdragon X5 LTE WWAN optional NXP NPC100 NFC		14.0" HD WLED SVA 300:1 60 Hz 220 nits or 14.0" FHD WLED SVA 300:1 60 Hz 300 nits or 14.0" FHD WLED SVA 300:1 60 Hz 300 nits touch or 14.0" QHD WLED UWVA 600:1 60 Hz 340 nits or 14.0" QHD WLED UWVA 600:1 60 Hz 340 nits touch		46 Wh	
EliteBook 755 G3	Excavator	38.33 x 25.77 x 1.94 cm	1.86 kg (4.1 lb)	AMD PRO A8-8600B (4C4T 1.6 GHz) or AMD PRO A10-8700B (4C4T 1.8 GHz) or AMD PRO A12-8800B (4C4T 2.1 GHz)		up to 32 GB DDR4-1600 (2 SODIMM slots)	AMD Radeon R6 Graphics or AMD Radeon R7 Graphics (A12)	one M.2 2280 drive one 2.5" drive	Broadcom 5762 GbE with DASH; Realtek RTL8188EE (802.11n) or Broadcom 943228 WLAN (802.11n Bluetooth 4.0) or Intel Wireless-AC 7265 WLAN (802.11ac Bluetooth 4.2) optional HP hs3110 HSPA+ WWAN or HP lt4120 Qualcomm Snapdragon X5 LTE WWAN optional NXP NPC100 NFC	15.6" HD WLED SVA 300:1 60 Hz 220 nits or 15.6" FHD WLED SVA 400:1 60 Hz 300 nits or 15.6" FHD WLED SVA 400:1 60 Hz 300 nits touch			46 Wh	
EliteBook 820 G3	Skylake	31.0 x 21.89 x 1.89 cm	1.26 kg (2.8 lb)	Intel Core i3-6100U (2C4T 2.3 GHz) or i5-6200U (2C4T 2.3 GHz) or i5-6300U (vPro 2C4T 2.4 GHz) or i7-6500U (2C4T 2.5 GHz) or i7-6600U (vPro 2C4T 2.6 GHz)		up to 64 GB DDR4-2133 (2 SODIMM slots)	Intel HD Graphics 520	one M.2 2280 drive one 2.5" drive	Intel I219-V GbE or Intel I219-LM GbE (vPro); Intel Wireless-AC 3165 WLAN (802.11ac Bluetooth 4.2) or Intel Wireless-AC 8260 WLAN (802.11ac Bluetooth 4.2) optional HP hs3110 HSPA+ WWAN or HP lt4120 Qualcomm Snapdragon X5 LTE WWAN optional NXP NPC100 NFC	Bang & Olufsen with integrated dual array microphone, premium speakers; HP Noise Reduction Software, HP Clear Sound AmpDTS Studio Sound, dual speakers and dual array digital microphone	all EliteBook 725 G3 options		44 Wh	
EliteBook 840 G3	Skylake	33.8 x 23.7 x 1.89 cm	1.48 kg (3.3 lb)	Intel Core i3-6100U (2C4T 2.3 GHz) or i5-6200U (2C4T 2.3 GHz) or i5-6300U (vPro 2C4T 2.4 GHz) or i7-6500U (2C4T 2.5 GHz) or i7-6600U (vPro 2C4T 2.6 GHz)		up to 64 GB DDR4-2133 (2 SODIMM slots)	Intel HD Graphics 520	one M.2 2280 drive one 2.5" drive	Intel I219-V GbE or Intel I219-LM GbE (vPro); Intel Wireless-AC 3165 WLAN (802.11ac Bluetooth 4.2) or Intel Wireless-AC 8260 WLAN (802.11ac Bluetooth 4.2) optional HP hs3110 HSPA+ WWAN or HP lt4120 Qualcomm Snapdragon X5 LTE WWAN optional NXP NPC100 NFC		14.0" HD WLED SVA 300:1 60 Hz 220 nits or 14.0" FHD WLED SVA 300:1 60 Hz 300 nits or 14.0" FHD WLED SVA 300:1 60 Hz 300 nits touch or 14.0" FHD WLED SVA 200:1 60 Hz 275 nits Sure View or 14.0" FHD WLED UWVA 600:1 60 Hz 300 nits or 14.0" QHD WLED UWVA 600:1 60 Hz 340 nits		46 Wh	
EliteBook 850 G3	Skylake	38.33 x 25.77 x 1.94 cm	1.84 kg (4.1 lb)	Intel Core i3-6100U (2C4T 2.3 GHz) or i5-6200U (2C4T 2.3 GHz) or i5-6300U (vPro 2C4T 2.4 GHz) or i7-6500U (2C4T 2.5 GHz) or i7-6600U (vPro 2C4T 2.6 GHz)		up to 64 GB DDR4-2133 (2 SODIMM slots)	Intel HD Graphics 520 optional AMD Radeon R7 M365X (1GB GDDR5)	one M.2 2280 drive one 2.5" drive	Intel I219-V GbE or Intel I219-LM GbE (vPro); Intel Wireless-AC 3165 WLAN (802.11ac Bluetooth 4.2) or Intel Wireless-AC 8260 WLAN (802.11ac Bluetooth 4.2) optional HP hs3110 HSPA+ WWAN or HP lt4120 Qualcomm Snapdragon X5 LTE WWAN optional NXP NPC100 NFC		all EliteBook 755 G3 options or 15.6" FHD WLED UWVA 600:1 60 Hz 300 nits or 15.6" UHD WLED UWVA 1000:1 60 Hz 340 nits		46 Wh	
EliteBook Folio G1	Skylake	29.2 x 20.9 x 1.24 cm	0.97 kg (2.1 lb)	Intel Core m3-6Y30 (2C4T 900 MHz) or m5-6Y54 (2C4T 1.1 GHz) or m5-6Y57 (vPro 2C4T 1.1 GHz) or m7-6Y75 (vPro 2C4T 1.2 GHz)		up to 8 GB LPDDR3-1866 (soldered)	Intel HD Graphics 515	one M.2 2280 drive	Intel Wireless-AC 8260 WLAN (802.11ac Bluetooth 4.2)		12.5" FHD WLED UWVA or 12.5" FHD WLED UWVA touch 12.5" FHD WLED UWVA Light weight 12.5" UHD WLED UWVA touch		38 Wh	
EliteBook 1030 G1	Skylake	31 x 21 x 1.57 cm	1.15 kg (2.5 lb)	Intel Core m5-6Y54 (2C4T 1.1 GHz) or m5-6Y57 (vPro 2C4T 1.1 GHz) or m7-6Y75 (vPro 2C4T 1.2 GHz)		up to 16 GB LPDDR3-1866 (soldered)	Intel HD Graphics 515	one M.2 2280 drive	Intel Wireless-AC 8260 WLAN (802.11ac Bluetooth 4.2) optional NFC		13.3" FHD WLED UWVA 1000:1 60 Hz 300 nits or 13.3" QHD+ WLED UWVA 1000:1 60 Hz 300 nits		40 Wh	
EliteBook 1040 G3	Skylake	33.7 x 23.45 x 1.58 cm	1.43 kg (3.2 lb)	Intel Core i5-6200U (2C4T 2.3 GHz) or i5-6300U (vPro 2C4T 2.4 GHz) or i7-6500U (2C4T 2.5 GHz) or i7-6600U (vPro 2C4T 2.6 GHz)		up to 16 GB DDR4-2133 (soldered)	Intel HD Graphics 520	one M.2 2280 drive	Intel I218-LM GbE; Intel Wireless-AC 8260 WLAN (802.11ac Bluetooth 4.2) optional HP hs3110 HSPA+ WWAN or HP lt4120 Qualcomm Snapdragon X5 LTE WWAN optional NFC		14.0" FHD WLED SVA 500:1 60 Hz 300 nits or 14.0" FHD WLED SVA 200:1 60 Hz 275 nits Sure View or 14.0" FHD WLED SVA 200:1 60 Hz 275 nits touch Sure View or 14.0" QHD WLED UWVA 600:1 60 Hz 340 nits or 14.0" QHD WLED UWVA 600:1 60 Hz 340 nits touch		45.6 Wh	
Elite x2 1012 G1	Skylake	300 x 213.5 x 8.05 mm	0.802 kg (1.77 lb)	All EliteBook Folio G1 options		up to 8 GB LPDDR3-1866 (soldered)	Intel HD Graphics 515	one M.2 2280 drive	Intel Wireless-AC 8260 WLAN (802.11ac Bluetooth 4.2) or Intel Wireless-AC 18260 WLAN (802.11ac Bluetooth 4.2 WiGig) optional HP hs3110 HSPA+ WWAN or HP lt4120 Qualcomm Snapdragon X5 LTE WWAN or HP lt4225 LTE/EV-DO Gobi 4G WWAN or HP lt4226 LTE/HSPA+ Gobi 4G WWAN		12.0" WUXGA WLED UWVA 60 Hz 340 nits touch	2MP 1080p FHD (front); 5MP 1080p FHD (back)	40 Wh	

=== Seventh generation ===
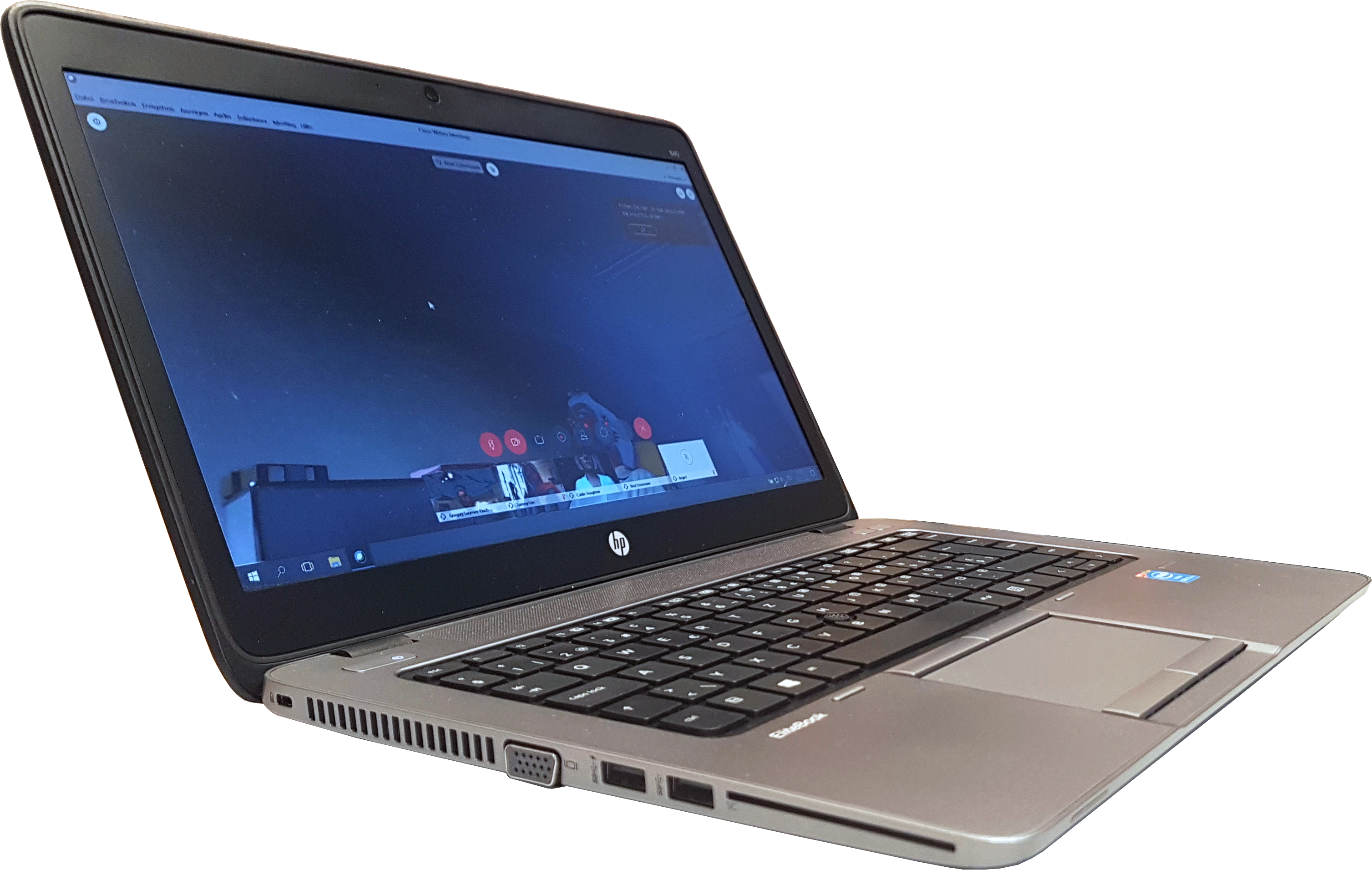
EliteBook 840 G4

This generation of EliteBook notebooks feature Intel Kaby Lake processors or AMD Excavator Bristol Ridge processors. EliteBook 725 G4, 745 G4 and 755 G4 with AMD processors were announced in November 2016. EliteBook 820 G4, 840 G4 and 850 G4 with Intel processors were announced in December 2016. EliteBook x360 1030 G2 was announced at CES 2017 in January 2017. EliteBook x360 1020 G2 and 1040 G4 were announced in September 2017. A refresh model, EliteBook 840r G4, was released in April 2018 with Intel Kaby Lake R processors as options.

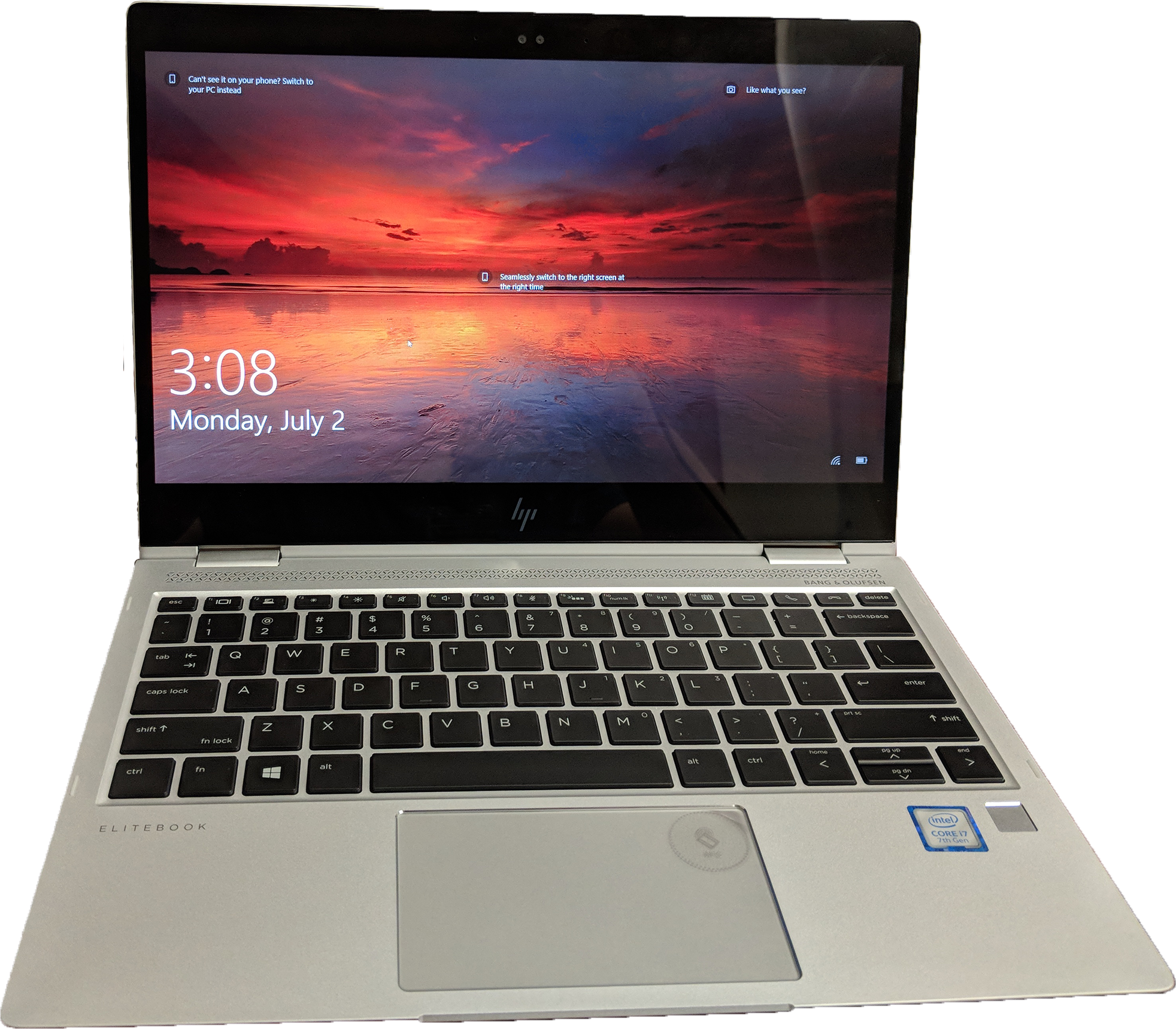
HP EliteBook x360 1020 G2

- EliteBook 725 G4: 12.5" mainstream with AMD processor
- EliteBook 745 G4: 14.0" mainstream with AMD processor
- EliteBook 755 G4: 15.6" mainstream with AMD processor
- EliteBook 820 G4: 12.5" mainstream with Intel processor
- EliteBook 840 G4: 14.0" mainstream with Intel processor
- EliteBook 850 G4: 15.6" mainstream with Intel processor
- EliteBook 840r G4: 14.0" mainstream with Intel processor
- EliteBook x360 1020 G2: 12.5" lightweight convertible with Intel processor
- EliteBook x360 1030 G2: 13.3" lightweight convertible with Intel processor
- EliteBook 1040 G4: 14.0" lightweight with Intel processor

HP Elite x2 1012 G2 tablet with Intel processors was introduced with this generation. The product was announced in May 2017.

- Elite x2 1012 G2: 12.3" tablet with Intel processor

Seventh generation (2016) specifications
Model	Platform	Dimensions	Weight ^{(min)}	CPU	Chipset	Memory	Graphics	Storage	Networking	Audio	Screen	Webcam	Battery	Operating system
EliteBook 725 G4	Excavator	31.0 x 21.89 x 1.89 cm	1.26 kg (2.8 lb)	AMD PRO A8-9600B (4C4T 2.4 GHz) or AMD PRO A10-8730B (4C4T 2.4 GHz) or AMD PRO A12-8830B (4C4T 2.5 GHz) or AMD PRO A12-9800B (4C4T 2.7 GHz)		up to 64GB DDR4-1866 (2 SODIMM slots)	AMD Radeon R5 Graphics or AMD Radeon R7 Graphics (A12)	one M.2 2280 drive one 2.5" drive	Broadcom 5762 GbE with DASH; Realtek RTL8723BE-VB WLAN (802.11n Bluetooth 4.0) or Intel Wireless-AC 3168 WLAN (802.11ac Bluetooth 4.2) or Intel Wireless-AC 7265 WLAN (802.11ac Bluetooth 4.2) optional HP hs3210 HSPA+ WWAN or HP lt4120 Qualcomm Snapdragon X5 LTE WWAN or HP It4132 LTE/HSPA+ 4G WWAN optional NXP NPC100 NFC	Bang & Olufsen	12.5" HD WLED SVA 300:1 60 Hz 220 nits or 12.5" FHD WLED UWVA 600:1 60 Hz 300 nits or 12.5" FHD WLED UWVA 600:1 60 Hz 300 nits touch	720p HD	44 Wh or 49 Wh	Windows 10 Pro
EliteBook 745 G4	Excavator	33.77 x 23.61 x 1.88 cm	1.48 kg (3.3 lb)	AMD PRO A8-9600B (4C4T 2.4 GHz) or AMD PRO A10-8730B (4C4T 2.4 GHz) or AMD PRO A12-8830B (4C4T 2.5 GHz) or AMD PRO A12-9800B (4C4T 2.7 GHz)		up to 64GB DDR4-1866 (2 SODIMM slots)	AMD Radeon R5 Graphics or AMD Radeon R7 Graphics (A12)	one M.2 2280 drive one 2.5" drive	Broadcom 5762 GbE with DASH; Realtek RTL8723BE-VB WLAN (802.11n Bluetooth 4.0) or Intel Wireless-AC 3168 WLAN (802.11ac Bluetooth 4.2) or Intel Wireless-AC 7265 WLAN (802.11ac Bluetooth 4.2) optional HP hs3210 HSPA+ WWAN or HP lt4120 Qualcomm Snapdragon X5 LTE WWAN or HP It4132 LTE/HSPA+ 4G WWAN optional NXP NPC100 NFC		14.0" HD WLED SVA 300:1 60 Hz 220 nits or 14.0" FHD WLED SVA 300:1 60 Hz 300 nits or 14.0" FHD WLED SVA 300:1 60 Hz 300 nits touch or 14.0" QHD WLED UWVA 600:1 60 Hz 340 nits	720p HD	46 Wh or 51 Wh	
EliteBook 755 G4	Excavator	38.34 x 25.64 x 1.92 cm	1.84 kg (4.1 lb)	AMD PRO A8-9600B (4C4T 2.4 GHz) or AMD PRO A10-8730B (4C4T 2.4 GHz) or AMD PRO A12-8830B (4C4T 2.5 GHz) or AMD PRO A12-9800B (4C4T 2.7 GHz)		up to 64GB DDR4-1866 (2 SODIMM slots)	AMD Radeon R5 Graphics or AMD Radeon R7 Graphics (A12)	one M.2 2280 drive one 2.5" drive	Broadcom 5762 GbE with DASH; Realtek RTL8723BE-VB WLAN (802.11n Bluetooth 4.0) or Intel Wireless-AC 3168 WLAN (802.11ac Bluetooth 4.2) or Intel Wireless-AC 7265 WLAN (802.11ac Bluetooth 4.2) optional HP hs3210 HSPA+ WWAN or HP lt4120 Qualcomm Snapdragon X5 LTE WWAN or HP It4132 LTE/HSPA+ 4G WWAN optional NXP NPC100 NFC	15.6" HD WLED SVA 300:1 60 Hz 220 nits or 15.6" FHD WLED SVA 400:1 60 Hz 300 nits or 15.6" FHD WLED SVA 400:1 60 Hz 300 nits touch		720p HD	46 Wh or 51 Wh	
EliteBook 820 G4	Kaby Lake	31.0 x 21.89 x 1.89 cm	1.26 kg (2.8 lb)	Intel Core i3-7100U (2C4T 2.4 GHz) or i5-7200U (2C4T 2.5 GHz) or i5-7300U (vPro 2C4T 2.6 GHz) or i7-7500U (2C4T 2.7 GHz) or i7-7600U (vPro 2C4T 2.8 GHz)		up to 64 GB DDR4-2133 (2 SODIMM slots)	Intel HD Graphics 620	one M.2 2280 drive one 2.5" drive	Intel I219-V GbE or Intel I219-LM GbE (vPro); Intel Wireless-AC 3168 WLAN (802.11ac Bluetooth 4.2) or Intel Wireless-AC 8265 WLAN (802.11ac Bluetooth 4.2) optional HP hs3210 HSPA+ WWAN or HP lt4120 Qualcomm Snapdragon X5 LTE WWAN or HP It4132 LTE/HSPA+ 4G WWAN optional NXP NPC100 NFC	all EliteBook 725 G4 options	49 Wh	720p HD		
EliteBook 840 G4	Kaby Lake	33.8 x 23.7 x 1.89 cm	1.48 kg (3.3 lb)	Intel Core i3-7100U (2C4T 2.4 GHz) or i5-7200U (2C4T 2.5 GHz) or i5-7300U (vPro 2C4T 2.6 GHz) or i7-7500U (2C4T 2.7 GHz) or i7-7600U (vPro 2C4T 2.8 GHz)		up to 64 GB DDR4-2133 (2 SODIMM slots)	Intel HD Graphics 620	one M.2 2280 drive one 2.5" drive	Intel I219-V GbE or Intel I219-LM GbE (vPro); Intel Wireless-AC 3168 WLAN (802.11ac Bluetooth 4.2) or Intel Wireless-AC 8265 WLAN (802.11ac Bluetooth 4.2) optional HP hs3210 HSPA+ WWAN or HP lt4120 Qualcomm Snapdragon X5 LTE WWAN or HP It4132 LTE/HSPA+ 4G WWAN optional NXP NPC100 NFC		all EliteBook 745 G4 options or 14.0" FHD WLED SVA 200:1 60 Hz 275 nits Sure View or 14.0" FHD WLED UWVA 600:1 60 Hz 300 nits	720p HD	51 Wh	
EliteBook 850 G4	Kaby Lake	38.36 x 25.77 x 1.94 cm	1.84 kg (4.1 lb)	Intel Core i3-7100U (2C4T 2.4 GHz) or i5-7200U (2C4T 2.5 GHz) or i5-7300U (vPro 2C4T 2.6 GHz) or i7-7500U (2C4T 2.7 GHz) or i7-7600U (vPro 2C4T 2.8 GHz)		up to 64 GB DDR4-2133 (2 SODIMM slots)	Intel HD Graphics 620 optional AMD Radeon R7 M465 (2 GB GDDR5)	one M.2 2280 drive one 2.5" drive	Intel I219-V GbE or Intel I219-LM GbE (vPro); Intel Wireless-AC 3168 WLAN (802.11ac Bluetooth 4.2) or Intel Wireless-AC 8265 WLAN (802.11ac Bluetooth 4.2) optional HP hs3210 HSPA+ WWAN or HP lt4120 Qualcomm Snapdragon X5 LTE WWAN or HP It4132 LTE/HSPA+ 4G WWAN optional NXP NPC100 NFC		all EliteBook 755 G4 options or 15.6" FHD WLED UWVA 600:1 60 Hz 300 nits or 15.6" UHD WLED UWVA 1000:1 60 Hz 340 nits	720p HD	51 Wh	
EliteBook 840r G4	Kaby Lake	33.8 x 23.7 x 1.89 cm	1.5 kg (3.3 lb)	Intel Core i5-7200U (2C4T 2.5 GHz) or i5-7300U (vPro 2C4T 2.6 GHz)		up to 64 GB DDR4-2133 (2 SODIMM slots)	Intel HD Graphics 620	one M.2 2280 drive one 2.5" drive	Intel I219-V GbE or Intel I219-LM GbE (vPro); Realtek RTL8822BE WLAN (802.11ac Bluetooth 4.2) or Intel Wireless-AC 8265 WLAN (802.11ac Bluetooth 4.2) optional HP lt4132 LTE/HSPA+ 4G WWAN or Intel XMM 7360 LTE-Advanced Cat 9 WWAN optional NXP NPC300 NFC	rowspan="2"	14.0" HD WLED SVA 300:1 60 Hz 220 nits 45% NTSC 6 bits (+Hi FRC) or 14.0" FHD WLED SVA 300:1 60 Hz 220 nits 45% NTSC 6 bits (+Hi FRC) or 14.0" FHD WLED SVA 300:1 60 Hz 220 nits 45% NTSC 6 bits (+Hi FRC) touch	720p HD	51 Wh	
EliteBook 840r G4	Kaby Lake R	33.8 x 23.7 x 1.89 cm	1.5 kg (3.3 lb)	Intel Core i5-8250U (4C8T 1.6 GHz) or i5-8350U (vPro 4C8T 1.7 GHz) or i7-8550U (4C8T 1.8 GHz) or i7-8650U (vPro 4C8T 1.9 GHz)		up to 64 GB DDR4-2400 (2 SODIMM slots)	Intel UHD Graphics 620	one M.2 2280 drive one 2.5" drive	Intel I219-V GbE or Intel I219-LM GbE (vPro); Realtek RTL8822BE WLAN (802.11ac Bluetooth 4.2) or Intel Wireless-AC 8265 WLAN (802.11ac Bluetooth 4.2) optional HP lt4132 LTE/HSPA+ 4G WWAN or Intel XMM 7360 LTE-Advanced Cat 9 WWAN optional NXP NPC300 NFC		14.0" HD WLED SVA 300:1 60 Hz 220 nits 45% NTSC 6 bits (+Hi FRC) or 14.0" FHD WLED SVA 300:1 60 Hz 220 nits 45% NTSC 6 bits (+Hi FRC) or 14.0" FHD WLED SVA 300:1 60 Hz 220 nits 45% NTSC 6 bits (+Hi FRC) touch	720p HD	51 Wh	
EliteBook x360 1020 G2	Kaby Lake	28.98 x 20.37 x 1.35 cm	1.13 kg (2.5 lb)	Intel Core i5-7200U (2C4T 2.5 GHz) or i5-7300U (vPro 2C4T 2.6 GHz) or i7-7500U (2C4T 2.7 GHz) or i7-7600U (vPro 2C4T 2.8 GHz)		up to 16 GB LPDDR3-1866 (soldered)	Intel HD Graphics 620	one M.2 2280 drive	Intel Wireless-AC 8265 WLAN (802.11ac Bluetooth 4.2) optional NXP NPC300 NFC		12.5" FHD WLED UWVA 800:1 60 Hz 400 nits 72% NTSC touch or 12.5" UHD WLED UWVA 1000:1 60 Hz 400 nits 95% NTSC touch	720p HD with IR	49.28 Wh	
EliteBook x360 1030 G2	Kaby Lake	31.70 x 21.84 x 1.50 cm	1.28 kg (2.8 lb)	Intel Core i5-7200U (2C4T 2.5 GHz) or i5-7300U (vPro 2C4T 2.6 GHz) or i7-7500U (2C4T 2.7 GHz) or i7-7600U (vPro 2C4T 2.8 GHz)		up to 16 GB DDR4-2133 (soldered)	Intel HD Graphics 620	one M.2 2280 drive	Intel Wireless-AC 8265 WLAN (802.11ac Bluetooth 4.2) optional HP hs3210 HSPA+ WWAN or HP It4132 LTE/HSPA+ 4G WWAN optional NXP NPC300 NFC		13.3" FHD WLED UWVA 800:1 60 Hz 300 nits touch or 13.3" UHD WLED UWVA 1400:1 60 Hz 340 nits touch	720p HD with IR	57 Wh	
EliteBook 1040 G4	Kaby Lake	32.89 x 23.29 x 1.60 cm	1.35 kg (3.0 lb)	Intel Core i5-7200U (2C4T 2.5 GHz) or i5-7300U (vPro 2C4T 2.6 GHz) or i7-7500U (2C4T 2.7 GHz) or i7-7600U (vPro 2C4T 2.8 GHz)		up to 16 GB DDR4-2133 (soldered)	Intel HD Graphics 620	one M.2 2280 drive	Intel Wireless-AC 8265 WLAN (802.11ac Bluetooth 4.2) optional HP hs3210 HSPA+ WWAN or HP lt4120 Qualcomm Snapdragon X5 LTE WWAN or HP It4132 LTE/HSPA+ 4G WWAN optional NXP NPC300 NFC		14.0" FHD WLED UWVA 600:1 60 Hz 340 nits 72% NTSC touch or 14.0" UHD WLED UWVA 1200:1 60 Hz 400 nits 72% NTSC touch	720p HD with IR	67 Wh	
EliteBook 1040 G4	Kaby Lake	32.89 x 23.29 x 1.60 cm	1.519 kg (3.35 lb)	Intel i7-7820HQ (vPro 4C8T 2.9 GHz)	Intel QM175	up to 16 GB DDR4-2133 (soldered)	Intel HD Graphics 630	one M.2 2280 drive	Intel Wireless-AC 8265 WLAN (802.11ac Bluetooth 4.2) optional HP hs3210 HSPA+ WWAN or HP lt4120 Qualcomm Snapdragon X5 LTE WWAN or HP It4132 LTE/HSPA+ 4G WWAN optional NXP NPC300 NFC		14.0" FHD WLED UWVA 600:1 60 Hz 340 nits 72% NTSC touch or 14.0" UHD WLED UWVA 1200:1 60 Hz 400 nits 72% NTSC touch	720p HD with IR	67 Wh	
Elite x2 1012 G2	Kaby Lake	299.72 x 213.36 x 7.62 mm	0.80286 kg (1.7700 lb)	Intel Core i3-7200U (2C4T 2.4 GHz) or i5-7200U (2C4T 2.5 GHz) or i5-7300U (vPro 2C4T 2.6 GHz) or i7-7600U (vPro 2C4T 2.8 GHz)		up to 16 GB LPDDR3-1866 (soldered)	Intel HD Graphics 620	one M.2 2280 drive	Intel Wireless-AC 8265 WLAN (802.11ac Bluetooth 4.2) optional HP hs3210 HSPA+ WWAN or HP lt4120 Qualcomm Snapdragon X5 LTE WWAN or HP It4132 LTE/HSPA+ 4G WWAN or HP lt4225 LTE/EV-DO Gobi 4G WWAN or HP lt4226 LTE/HSPA+ Gobi 4G WWAN		12.3" 2736x1824 WLED UWVA 60 Hz 450 nits 72% NTSC touch	5MP 1080p FHD with IR (front); 8MP 1080p FHD (back)	47Wh	

=== Eighth generation ===
This generation of EliteBook notebooks feature Intel Kaby Lake, Kaby Lake R and Coffee Lake processors or AMD Zen Raven Ridge processors. EliteBook 830 G5, 840 G5 and 850 G5 with Intel Core processors were announced in February 2018. EliteBook 735 G5, 745 G5 and 755 G5 with AMD processors were announced in May 2018. EliteBook 1050 G1 with Intel Coffee Lake processors was also announced in May 2018. One of the two lightweight convertibles, EliteBook x360 1030 G3 was announced in May 2018, and followed by EliteBook x360 1040 G5 announced in October 2018. Another convertible, EliteBook x360 830 G5, was announced at CES 2019 in January 2019. The EliteBook x360 1020 model was discontinued in this generation.

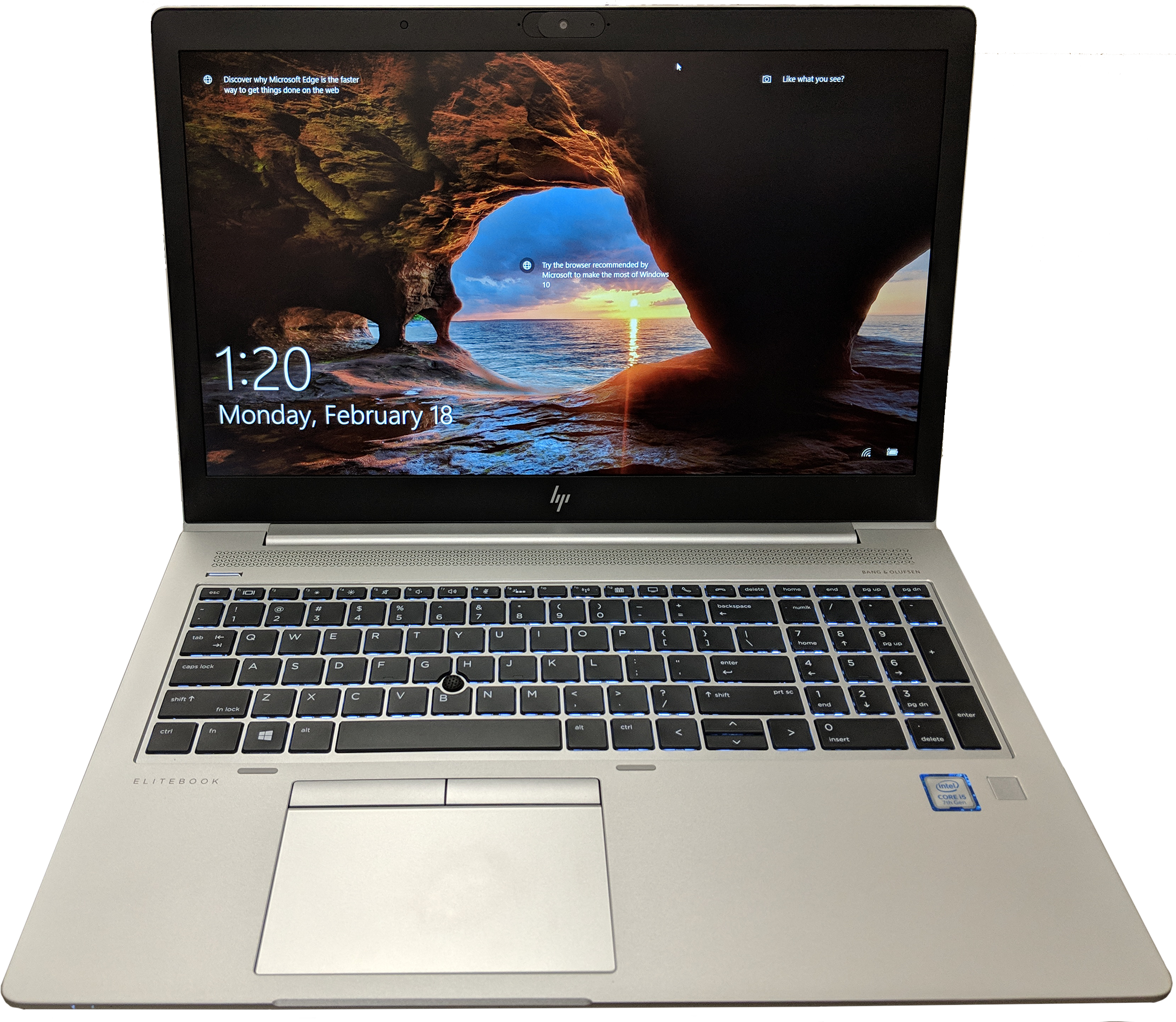
HP EliteBook 850 G5

- EliteBook 735 G5: 13.3" mainstream with AMD processor
- EliteBook 745 G5: 14.0" mainstream with AMD processor
- EliteBook 755 G5: 15.6" Mainstream with AMD processor
- EliteBook x360 830 G5: 13.3" mainstream convertible with Intel processor
- EliteBook 830 G5: 13.3" mainstream with Intel processor
- EliteBook 840 G5: 14.0" mainstream with Intel processor
- EliteBook 850 G5: 15.6" mainstream with Intel processor
- EliteBook x360 1030 G3: 13.3" lightweight convertible with Intel processor
- EliteBook x360 1040 G5: 14.0" lightweight convertible with Intel processor
- EliteBook 1050 G1: 15.6" lightweight with Intel processor

HP Elite x2 1013 G3 tablet with Intel processors was introduced with this generation. The product was announced in May 2018.

- Elite x2 1013 G3: 13" tablet with Intel processor

Eighth generation (2017) specifications
Model	Platform	Dimensions	Weight ^{(min)}	CPU	Chipset	Memory	Graphics	Storage	Networking	Audio	Screen	Webcam	Battery	Operating system
EliteBook 735 G5	Zen	31.03 x 22.94 x 1.78 cm	1.33 kg (2.9 lb)	AMD Ryzen 3 PRO 2300U (4C4T 2.0 GHz) or AMD Ryzen 5 PRO 2500U (4C8T 2.0 GHz) or AMD Ryzen 7 PRO 2700U (4C8T 2.2 GHz)		up to 64 GB DDR4-2400 (2 SODIMM slots)	AMD Radeon; Vega 6 Graphics (Ryzen 3) or Vega 8 Graphics (Ryzen 5) or Vega 10 Graphics (Ryzen 7)	one M.2 2280 drive	Realtek PCIe GbE; Realtek RTL8822BE WLAN (802.11ac Bluetooth 4.2) or Intel Wireless-AC 8265 WLAN (802.11ac Bluetooth 4.2) optional HP lt4132 LTE/HSPA+ 4G WWAN or Intel XMM 7360 LTE-Advanced Cat 9 WWAN optional NXP NPC300 NFC		13.3" FHD WLED UWVA 600:1 60 Hz 220 nits 45% NTSC 6 bits (+Hi FRC) or 13.3" FHD WLED UWVA 600:1 60 Hz 220 nits 45% NTSC 6 bits (+Hi FRC) touch or 13.3" FHD WLED UWVA 600:1 60 Hz 400 nits 72% NTSC 6 bits (+Hi FRC) or 13.3" FHD WLED UWVA 600:1 120 Hz 300 nits 72% NTSC 6 bits (+Hi FRC) Sure View	720p HD or 720p HD with IR	50 Wh	
EliteBook 745 G5	Zen	32.6 x 23.4 x 1.79 cm	1.48 kg (3.3 lb)	AMD Ryzen 3 PRO 2300U (4C4T 2.0 GHz) or AMD Ryzen 5 PRO 2500U (4C8T 2.0 GHz) or AMD Ryzen 7 PRO 2700U (4C8T 2.2 GHz)		up to 64 GB DDR4-2400 (2 SODIMM slots)	AMD Radeon; Vega 6 Graphics (Ryzen 3) or Vega 8 Graphics (Ryzen 5) or Vega 10 Graphics (Ryzen 7)	one M.2 2280 drive	Realtek PCIe GbE; Realtek RTL8822BE WLAN (802.11ac Bluetooth 4.2) or Intel Wireless-AC 8265 WLAN (802.11ac Bluetooth 4.2) optional HP lt4132 LTE/HSPA+ 4G WWAN or Intel XMM 7360 LTE-Advanced Cat 9 WWAN optional NXP NPC300 NFC		14.0" FHD WLED UWVA 600:1 60 Hz 220 nits 45% NTSC 6 bits (+Hi FRC) or 14.0" FHD WLED UWVA 600:1 60 Hz 220 nits 45% NTSC 6 bits (+Hi FRC) touch or 14.0" FHD WLED UWVA 600:1 60 Hz 400 nits 72% NTSC 6 bits (+Hi FRC) or 14.0" FHD WLED UWVA 600:1 120 Hz 700 nits 72% NTSC 6 bits (+Hi FRC) Sure View	720p HD or 720p HD with IR	50 Wh	
EliteBook 755 G5	Zen	37.08 x 25.17 x 1.83 cm	1.86 kg (4.1 lb)	AMD Ryzen 3 PRO 2300U (4C4T 2.0 GHz) or AMD Ryzen 5 PRO 2500U (4C8T 2.0 GHz) or AMD Ryzen 7 PRO 2700U (4C8T 2.2 GHz)		up to 64 GB DDR4-2400 (2 SODIMM slots)	AMD Radeon; Vega 6 Graphics (Ryzen 3) or Vega 8 Graphics (Ryzen 5) or Vega 10 Graphics (Ryzen 7)	one M.2 2280 drive	Realtek PCIe GbE; Realtek RTL8822BE WLAN (802.11ac Bluetooth 4.2) or Intel Wireless-AC 8265 WLAN (802.11ac Bluetooth 4.2) optional HP lt4132 LTE/HSPA+ 4G WWAN or Intel XMM 7360 LTE-Advanced Cat 9 WWAN optional NXP NPC300 NFC		15.6" FHD WLED UWVA 600:1 60 Hz 220 nits 45% NTSC 6 bits (+Hi FRC); 15.6" FHD WLED UWVA 600:1 60 Hz 220 nits 45% NTSC 6 bits (+Hi FRC) touch or 15.6" FHD WLED UWVA 600:1 60 Hz 400 nits 72% NTSC 6 bits (+Hi FRC) or 15.6" FHD WLED UWVA 600:1 120 Hz 650 nits 72% NTSC 8 bits Sure View	720p HD or 720p HD with IR	56 Wh	
EliteBook x360 830 G5	Kaby Lake R	30.66 x 21.52 x 1.69 cm	1.35 kg (3.0 lb)	Intel Core i3-8130U (2C4T 2.2 GHz) or i5-8250U (4C8T 1.6 GHz) or i5-8350U (vPro 4C8T 1.7 GHz) or i7-8550U (4C8T 1.8 GHz) or i7-8650U (vPro 4C8T 1.9 GHz)		up to 64 GB DDR4-2400 (2 SODIMM slots)	Intel UHD Graphics 620	one M.2 2280 drive	Intel Wireless-AC 8265 WLAN (802.11ac Bluetooth 4.2) optional Intel XMM 7262 LTE-Advanced Cat 6 WWAN or Intel XMM 7360 LTE-Advanced Cat 9 WWAN or Intel XMM 7560 LTE-Advanced Pro Cat 16 WWAN optional NXP NPC300 NFC		13.3" FHD WLED UWVA 600:1 60 Hz 220 nits 45% NTSC 6 bits touch or 13.3" FHD WLED UWVA 1500:1 60 Hz 400 nits 72% NTSC 8 bits touch or 13.3" FHD WLED UWVA 2000:1 60 Hz 1000 nits 72% NTSC 8 bits touch Sure View	720p HD or 720p HD with IR	53 Wh	
EliteBook 830 G5	Kaby Lake	31.04 x 22.94 x 1.78 cm	1.338 kg (2.95 lb)	Intel Core i5-7200U (2C4T 2.5 GHz) or i5-7300U (vPro 2C4T 2.6 GHz) or i7-7500U (2C4T 2.7 GHz) or i7-7600U (vPro 2C4T 2.8 GHz)		up to 64 GB DDR4-2400 (2 SODIMM slots)	Intel HD Graphics 620	one M.2 2280 drive	Intel I219-V GbE or Intel I219-LM GbE (vPro); Realtek RTL8822BE WLAN (802.11ac Bluetooth 4.2) or Intel Wireless-AC 8265 WLAN (802.11ac Bluetooth 4.2) optional HP lt4132 LTE/HSPA+ 4G WWAN or Intel XMM 7360 LTE-Advanced Cat 9 WWAN optional NXP NPC300 NFC		all EliteBook 735 G5 options or 13.3" FHD WLED UWVA 600:1 120 Hz 300 nits 72% NTSC 6 bits (+Hi FRC) touch Sure View	720p HD or 720p HD with IR	50 Wh	
EliteBook 830 G5	Kaby Lake R	31.04 x 22.94 x 1.78 cm	1.338 kg (2.95 lb)	Intel Core i5-8250U (4C8T 1.6 GHz) or i5-8350U (vPro 4C8T 1.7 GHz) or i7-8550U (4C8T 1.8 GHz) or i7-8650U (vPro 4C8T 1.9 GHz)		up to 64 GB DDR4-2400 (2 SODIMM slots)	Intel UHD Graphics 620	one M.2 2280 drive	Intel I219-V GbE or Intel I219-LM GbE (vPro); Realtek RTL8822BE WLAN (802.11ac Bluetooth 4.2) or Intel Wireless-AC 8265 WLAN (802.11ac Bluetooth 4.2) optional HP lt4132 LTE/HSPA+ 4G WWAN or Intel XMM 7360 LTE-Advanced Cat 9 WWAN optional NXP NPC300 NFC		all EliteBook 735 G5 options or 13.3" FHD WLED UWVA 600:1 120 Hz 300 nits 72% NTSC 6 bits (+Hi FRC) touch Sure View	720p HD or 720p HD with IR	50 Wh	
EliteBook 840 G5	Kaby Lake	32.61 x 23.42 x 1.80 cm	1.48 kg (3.3 lb)	all EliteBook 830 G5 Kaby Lake options		up to 64 GB DDR4-2400 (2 SODIMM slots)	Intel HD Graphics 620 optional AMD Radeon RX 540 (2 GB GDDR5)	one M.2 2280 drive	Intel I219-V GbE or Intel I219-LM GbE (vPro); Realtek RTL8822BE WLAN (802.11ac Bluetooth 4.2) or Intel Wireless-AC 8265 WLAN (802.11ac Bluetooth 4.2) optional HP lt4132 LTE/HSPA+ 4G WWAN or Intel XMM 7360 LTE-Advanced Cat 9 WWAN optional NXP NPC300 NFC		all EliteBook 745 G5 options or 14.0" FHD WLED UWVA 600:1 120 Hz 700 nits 72% NTSC 6 bits (+Hi FRC) touch Sure View; 14.0" UHD WLED UWVA 1200:1 60 Hz 400 nits 72% NTSC 8 bits	720p HD or 720p HD with IR	50 Wh	
EliteBook 840 G5	Kaby Lake R	32.61 x 23.42 x 1.80 cm	1.48 kg (3.3 lb)	all EliteBook 830 G5 Kaby Lake R options		up to 64 GB DDR4-2400 (2 SODIMM slots)	Intel UHD Graphics 620 optional AMD Radeon RX 540 (2 GB GDDR5)	one M.2 2280 drive	Intel I219-V GbE or Intel I219-LM GbE (vPro); Realtek RTL8822BE WLAN (802.11ac Bluetooth 4.2) or Intel Wireless-AC 8265 WLAN (802.11ac Bluetooth 4.2) optional HP lt4132 LTE/HSPA+ 4G WWAN or Intel XMM 7360 LTE-Advanced Cat 9 WWAN optional NXP NPC300 NFC		all EliteBook 745 G5 options or 14.0" FHD WLED UWVA 600:1 120 Hz 700 nits 72% NTSC 6 bits (+Hi FRC) touch Sure View; 14.0" UHD WLED UWVA 1200:1 60 Hz 400 nits 72% NTSC 8 bits	720p HD or 720p HD with IR	50 Wh	
EliteBook 850 G5	Kaby Lake	37.08 x 25.17 x 1.83 cm	1.78 kg (3.9 lb)	all EliteBook 830 G5 Kaby Lake options		up to 64 GB DDR4-2400 (2 SODIMM slots)	all EliteBook 840 G5 Kaby Lake options	one M.2 2280 drive	Intel I219-V GbE or Intel I219-LM GbE (vPro); Realtek RTL8822BE WLAN (802.11ac Bluetooth 4.2) or Intel Wireless-AC 8265 WLAN (802.11ac Bluetooth 4.2) optional HP lt4132 LTE/HSPA+ 4G WWAN or Intel XMM 7360 LTE-Advanced Cat 9 WWAN optional NXP NPC300 NFC		all EliteBook 755 G5 options or 15.6" UHD WLED UWVA 1200:1 60 Hz 400 nits 72% NTSC 8 bits	720p HD or 720p HD with IR	56 Wh	
EliteBook 850 G5	Kaby Lake R	37.08 x 25.17 x 1.83 cm	1.78 kg (3.9 lb)	all EliteBook 830 G5 Kaby Lake R options		up to 64 GB DDR4-2400 (2 SODIMM slots)	all EliteBook 840 G5 Kaby Lake R options	one M.2 2280 drive	Intel I219-V GbE or Intel I219-LM GbE (vPro); Realtek RTL8822BE WLAN (802.11ac Bluetooth 4.2) or Intel Wireless-AC 8265 WLAN (802.11ac Bluetooth 4.2) optional HP lt4132 LTE/HSPA+ 4G WWAN or Intel XMM 7360 LTE-Advanced Cat 9 WWAN optional NXP NPC300 NFC		all EliteBook 755 G5 options or 15.6" UHD WLED UWVA 1200:1 60 Hz 400 nits 72% NTSC 8 bits	720p HD or 720p HD with IR	56 Wh	
EliteBook x360 1030 G3	Kaby Lake R	30.58 x 20.5 x 1.58 cm	1.25 kg (2.8 lb)	all EliteBook 830 G5 Kaby Lake R options		up to 16 GB LPDDR3-2133 (soldered)	Intel UHD Graphics 620	one M.2 2280 drive	Intel Wireless-AC 8265 WLAN (802.11ac Bluetooth 4.2) optional HP lt4132 LTE/HSPA+ 4G WWAN or Intel XMM 7360 LTE-Advanced Cat 9 WWAN or Qualcomm Snapdragon X12 LTE-Advanced Cat 9 WWAN optional NXP NPC300 NFC		13.3" FHD WLED UWVA 800:1 60 Hz 400 nits 72% NTSC 6 bits touch or 13.3" FHD WLED UWVA 600:1 120 Hz 700 nits 72% NTSC 6 bits (+Hi FRC) touch Sure View or 13.3" UHD WLED UWVA 1400:1 60 Hz 500 nits 72% NTSC 8 bits touch	1080p FHD with IR	56.2 Wh	
EliteBook x360 1040 G5	Kaby Lake R	32.14 x 21.5 x 1.69 cm	1.36 kg (3.0 lb)	all EliteBook 830 G5 Kaby Lake R options		up to 32 GB DDR4-2400 (soldered)	Intel UHD Graphics 620	one M.2 2280 drive	Intel Wireless-AC 8265 WLAN (802.11ac Bluetooth 4.2) optional HP lt4132 LTE/HSPA+ 4G WWAN or Intel XMM 7360 LTE-Advanced Cat 9 WWAN or Intel XMM 7560 LTE-Advanced Pro Cat 16 WWAN optional NXP NPC300 NFC		14.0" FHD WLED UWVA 1200:1 60 Hz 400 nits 72% NTSC 6 bits touch or 14.0" FHD WLED UWVA 600:1 120 Hz 700 nits 72% NTSC 8 bits touch Sure View or 14.0" UHD WLED UWVA 1200:1 60 Hz 500 nits 72% NTSC 8 bits touch	1080p FHD with IR	56 Wh	
EliteBook 1050 G1	Coffee Lake	36 x 25.4 x 1.89 cm	2.06 kg (4.5 lb)	Intel Core i5-8300H (4C8T 2.3 GHz) or i5-8400H (vPro 4C8T 2.5 GHz) or i7-8750H (6C12T 2.2 GHz) or i7-8850H (vPro 6C12T 2.6 GHz)	Intel CM246	up to 64 GB DDR4-2666 (2 SODIMM slots)	Intel UHD Graphics 630 optional NVIDIA GeForce GTX 1050 Max-Q (4 GB GDDR5)	two M.2 2280 drive	Intel Wireless-AC 9560 (802.11ac Bluetooth 5.0) WLAN optional NXP NPC300 NFC		15.6" FHD WLED UWVA 600:1 60 Hz 400 nits 72% sRGB 6 bits (+Hi FRC) or 15.6" FHD WLED UWVA 600:1 120 Hz 650 nits 72% NTSC 6 bits (+FRC) Sure View or 15.6" UHD WLED UWVA 1200:1 60 Hz 400 nits 72% sRGB 6 bits (+Hi FRC)	720p HD or 720p HD with IR	64 Wh or 95.6 Wh	
Elite x2 1013 G3	Kaby Lake R	30.0 x 0.79 x 23.14 cm	0.808 kg (1.78 lb)	all EliteBook x360 830 G5 options		up to 16 GB LPDDR3-2133 (soldered)	Intel UHD Graphics 620	one M.2 2280 drive	Intel Wireless-AC 8265 WLAN (802.11ac Bluetooth 4.2) optional HP lt4132 LTE/HSPA+ 4G WWAN or HP lt4220 LTE/HSPA+ 4G WWAN		13.0" WUXGA+ WLED UWVA 600:1 120 Hz 700 nits 72% NTSC 6 bits (+Hi FRC) touch Sure View or 13.0" 3K WLED UWVA 1800:1 60 Hz 450 nits 72% NTSC 6 bits touch	5MP 1080p FHD with IR (front); 8MP 1080p FHD (back)	50 Wh	

=== Ninth generation ===
This generation of EliteBook notebooks feature Intel Whiskey Lake processors or AMD Zen+ Picasso processors. EliteBook x360 830 G6, 830 G6, 840 G6, and 850 G6 with Intel Core processors were announced in April 2019. EliteBook x360 1030 G4 and x360 1040 G6 with Intel Core processors were announced in May 2019. Elitebook 735 G6 and 745 G6 with AMD Ryzen Pro processors were announced in June 2019. New features introduced in this generation include optional 1000-nit display, privacy camera shutter, 802.11ax WiFi and Bluetooth 5.

- EliteBook 735 G6: 13.3" mainstream with AMD processor
- EliteBook 745 G6: 14.0" mainstream with AMD processor
- EliteBook x360 830 G6: 13.3" mainstream convertible with Intel processor
- EliteBook 830 G6: 13.3" mainstream with Intel processor
- EliteBook 840 G6: 14.0" mainstream with Intel processor
- EliteBook 850 G6: 15.6" mainstream with Intel processor
- EliteBook x360 1030 G4: 13.3" lightweight convertible with Intel processor
- EliteBook x360 1040 G6: 14.0" lightweight convertible with Intel processor

Other HP Elite notebook and tablet products introduced with this generation include Elite x2 G4 and Elite Dragonfly. Elite x2 G4 was announced in May 2019 with EliteBook x360 convertibles. Elite Dragonfly was announced in September 2019.

- Elite x2 G4: 12.3" or 13" tablet with Intel processor
- Elite Dragonfly: 13.3" ultra-lightweight convertible with Intel processor

Ninth generation (2018) specifications
Model	Platform	Dimensions	Weight ^{(min)}	CPU	Chipset	Memory	Graphics	Storage	Networking	Audio	Screen	Webcam	Battery	Operating system
EliteBook 735 G6	Zen+	31.04 x 22.93 x 1.77 cm	1.33 kg (2.9 lb)	AMD Ryzen 3 PRO 3300U (4C4T 2.1 GHz) or AMD Ryzen 5 PRO 3500U (4C8T 2.1 GHz) or AMD Ryzen 7 PRO 3700U (4C8T 2.3 GHz)		up to 64 GB DDR4-2400 (2 SODIMM slots)	AMD Radeon; Vega 6 Graphics (Ryzen 3) or Vega 8 Graphics (Ryzen 5) or Vega 10 Graphics (Ryzen 7)	one M.2 2280 drive	Realtek RTL8111EPH PCIe GbE; Realtek RTL8822BE WLAN (802.11ac Bluetooth 4.2) or Intel Wireless-AC 9260 WLAN (802.11ac Bluetooth 5.0) or Intel Wireless-AX 22260 (Wi-Fi 6 AX200) WLAN (802.11ax Bluetooth 5.1) optional Intel XMM 7360 LTE-Advanced Cat 9 WWAN optional NXP NPC300 NFC	Bang & Olufsen with dual stereo speakers and 3 multi array microphone	13.3" FHD WLED UWVA 600:1 60 Hz 250 nits 45% NTSC 6 bits or 13.3" FHD WLED UWVA 600:1 60 Hz 250 nits 45% NTSC 6 bits touch or 13.3" FHD WLED UWVA 1200:1 60 Hz 400 nits 72% NTSC 8 bits or 13.3" FHD WLED UWVA 2000:1 60 Hz 1000 nits 72% NTSC 8 bits Sure View	720p HD or 720p HD with IR	50 Wh	
EliteBook 745 G6	Zen+	32.61 x 23.42 x 1.78 cm	1.50 kg (3.3 lb)	AMD Ryzen 3 PRO 3300U (4C4T 2.1 GHz) or AMD Ryzen 5 PRO 3500U (4C8T 2.1 GHz) or AMD Ryzen 7 PRO 3700U (4C8T 2.3 GHz)		up to 64 GB DDR4-2400 (2 SODIMM slots)	AMD Radeon; Vega 6 Graphics (Ryzen 3) or Vega 8 Graphics (Ryzen 5) or Vega 10 Graphics (Ryzen 7)	one M.2 2280 drive	Realtek RTL8111EPH PCIe GbE; Realtek RTL8822BE WLAN (802.11ac Bluetooth 4.2) or Intel Wireless-AC 9260 WLAN (802.11ac Bluetooth 5.0) or Intel Wireless-AX 22260 (Wi-Fi 6 AX200) WLAN (802.11ax Bluetooth 5.1) optional Intel XMM 7360 LTE-Advanced Cat 9 WWAN optional NXP NPC300 NFC	Bang & Olufsen with dual stereo speakers and 3 multi array microphone	14.0" FHD WLED UWVA 600:1 60 Hz 250 nits 45% NTSC 6 bits or 14.0" FHD WLED UWVA 600:1 60 Hz 250 nits 45% NTSC 6 bits touch or 14.0" FHD WLED UWVA 600:1 60 Hz 400 nits 72% NTSC 6 bits (+Hi FRC) or 14.0" FHD WLED UWVA 2000:1 60 Hz 1000 nits 72% NTSC 8 bits Sure View	720p HD or 720p HD with IR	50 Wh	
EliteBook x360 830 G6	Whiskey Lake	30.66 x 21.52 x 1.69 cm	1.35 kg (3.0 lb)	Intel Core i3-8145U (2C4T 2.1 GHz) or i5-8265U (4C8T 1.6 GHz) or i5-8365U (vPro 4C8T 1.6 GHz) or i7-8565U (4C8T 1.8 GHz) or i7-8665U (vPro 4C8T 1.9 GHz)		up to 64 GB DDR4-2400 (2 SODIMM slots)	Intel UHD Graphics 620	one M.2 2280 drive	Intel Wireless-AC 9560 WLAN (802.11ac Bluetooth 5.0) or Intel Wireless-AX 22260 (Wi-Fi 6 AX200) WLAN (802.11ax Bluetooth 5.1) optional Intel XMM 7262 LTE-Advanced Cat 6 WWAN or Intel XMM 7360 LTE-Advanced Cat 9 WWAN or Intel XMM 7560 LTE-Advanced Pro Cat 16 WWAN optional NXP NPC300 NFC		13.3" FHD WLED UWVA 600:1 60 Hz 250 nits 45% NTSC 6 bits touch or 13.3" FHD WLED UWVA 1500:1 60 Hz 400 nits 72% NTSC 8 bits touch or 13.3" FHD WLED UWVA 2000:1 60 Hz 1000 nits 72% NTSC 8 bits touch Sure View	720p HD or 720p HD with IR	53 Wh	
EliteBook 830 G6	Whiskey Lake	31.04 x 22.93 x 1.77 cm	1.33 kg (2.9 lb)	Intel Core i3-8145U (2C4T 2.1 GHz) or i5-8265U (4C8T 1.6 GHz) or i5-8365U (vPro 4C8T 1.6 GHz) or i7-8565U (4C8T 1.8 GHz) or i7-8665U (vPro 4C8T 1.9 GHz)		up to 64 GB DDR4-2400 (2 SODIMM slots)	Intel UHD Graphics 620	one M.2 2280 drive	all EliteBook x360 830 G6 options Intel I219-V GbE or Intel I219-LM GbE (vPro)		all EliteBook 735 G6 options or 13.3" FHD WLED UWVA 2000:1 60 Hz 1000 nits 72% NTSC 8 bits touch Sure View	720p HD or 720p HD with IR	50 Wh	
EliteBook 840 G6	Whiskey Lake	32.6 x 23.43 x 1.79 cm	1.48 kg (3.3 lb)	Intel Core i5-8265U (4C8T 1.6 GHz) or i5-8365U (vPro 4C8T 1.6 GHz) or i7-8565U (4C8T 1.8 GHz) or i7-8665U (vPro 4C8T 1.9 GHz)		up to 64 GB DDR4-2400 (2 SODIMM slots)	Intel UHD Graphics 620 optional AMD Radeon RX 550X (2 GB GDDR5)	one M.2 2280 drive	all EliteBook x360 830 G6 options Intel I219-V GbE or Intel I219-LM GbE (vPro)		all EliteBook 745 G6 options or 14.0" FHD WLED UWVA 2000:1 60 Hz 1000 nits 72% NTSC 8 bits touch Sure View or 14.0" UHD WLED UWVA 1200:1 60 Hz 400 nits 72% NTSC 8 bits	720p HD or 720p HD with IR	50 Wh	
EliteBook 850 G6	Whiskey Lake	37.0 x 25.17 x 1.83 cm	1.78 kg (3.9 lb)	Intel Core i5-8265U (4C8T 1.6 GHz) or i5-8365U (vPro 4C8T 1.6 GHz) or i7-8565U (4C8T 1.8 GHz) or i7-8665U (vPro 4C8T 1.9 GHz)		up to 64 GB DDR4-2400 (2 SODIMM slots)	Intel UHD Graphics 620 optional AMD Radeon RX 550X (2 GB GDDR5)	one M.2 2280 drive	all EliteBook x360 830 G6 options Intel I219-V GbE or Intel I219-LM GbE (vPro)		15.6" FHD WLED UWVA 600:1 60 Hz 250 nits 45% NTSC 6 bits or 15.6" FHD WLED UWVA 600:1 60 Hz 250 nits 45% NTSC 6 bits touch or 15.6" FHD WLED UWVA 600:1 60 Hz 400 nits 72% NTSC 6 bits (+Hi FRC) or 15.6" FHD WLED UWVA 2000:1 60 Hz 1000 nits 72% NTSC 8 bits Sure View or 15.6" UHD WLED UWVA 1200:1 60 Hz 400 nits 72% NTSC 8 bits (+Hi FRC)	720p HD or 720p HD with IR	56 Wh	
EliteBook x360 1030 G4	Whiskey Lake	30.58 x 20.5 x 1.58 cm	1.27 kg (2.8 lb)	Intel Core i5-8265U (4C8T 1.6 GHz) or i5-8365U (vPro 4C8T 1.6 GHz) or i7-8565U (4C8T 1.8 GHz) or i7-8665U (vPro 4C8T 1.9 GHz)		up to 16 GB LPDDR3-2133 (soldered)	Intel UHD Graphics 620	one M.2 2280 drive	Intel Wireless-AX 22260 (Wi-Fi 6 AX200) WLAN (802.11ax Bluetooth 5.1) optional Intel XMM 7360 LTE-Advanced Cat 9 WWAN or Intel XMM 7560 LTE-Advanced Pro Cat 16 WWAN optional NXP NPC300 NFC		13.3" FHD WLED UWVA 800:1 60 Hz 400 nits 72% NTSC 6 bits touch or 13.3" FHD WLED UWVA 2000:1 60 Hz 1000 nits 72% NTSC 8 bits touch Sure View or 13.3" UHD WLED UWVA 1400:1 60 Hz 500 nits 72% NTSC 8 bits touch	1080p FHD with IR	56.2 Wh	
EliteBook x360 1040 G6	Whiskey Lake	32.14 x 21.5 x 1.69 cm	1.35 kg (3.0 lb)	Intel Core i5-8265U (4C8T 1.6 GHz) or i5-8365U (vPro 4C8T 1.6 GHz) or i7-8565U (4C8T 1.8 GHz) or i7-8665U (vPro 4C8T 1.9 GHz)		up to 32 GB DDR4-2666 (soldered)	Intel UHD Graphics 620	one M.2 2280 drive	Intel Wireless-AX 22260 (Wi-Fi 6 AX200) WLAN (802.11ax Bluetooth 5.1) optional Intel XMM 7360 LTE-Advanced Cat 9 WWAN or Intel XMM 7560 LTE-Advanced Pro Cat 16 WWAN optional NXP NPC300 NFC		14.0" FHD WLED UWVA 1200:1 60 Hz 400 nits 72% NTSC 6 bits touch or 14.0" FHD WLED UWVA 2000:1 60 Hz 1000 nits 72% NTSC 8 bits touch Sure View or 13.3" UHD WLED UWVA 1050:1 60 Hz 550 nits 72% NTSC 8 bits touch	1080p FHD with IR	56.2 Wh	
Elite x2 G4	Whiskey Lake	28.93 x 21.58 x 0.88 cm	0.83 kg (1.8 lb)	Intel Core i5-8265U (4C8T 1.6 GHz) or i5-8365U (vPro 4C8T 1.6 GHz) or i7-8565U (4C8T 1.8 GHz) or i7-8665U (vPro 4C8T 1.9 GHz)		up to 16 GB LPDDR3-2133 (soldered)	Intel UHD Graphics 620	one M.2 2280 drive	Intel Wireless-AX 22260 (Wi-Fi 6 AX200) WLAN (802.11ax Bluetooth 5.1) optional Intel XMM 7360 LTE-Advanced Cat 9 WWAN or Intel XMM 7560 LTE-Advanced Pro Cat 16 WWAN		12.3" WUXGA+ WLED UWVA 1200:1 60 Hz 400 nits 72% NTSC 6 bits touch or 13.0" 3K WLED UWVA 1800:1 60 Hz 450 nits 72% NTSC 6 bits touch or 13.0" FHD WLED UWVA 2000:1 60 Hz 1000 nits 72% NTSC 8 bits touch Sure View	1080p FHD with IR (front); 8MP (back)	47 Wh	
Elite Dragonfly	Whiskey Lake	30.43 x 19.75 x 1.61 cm	0.99 kg (2.2 lb)	all EliteBook x360 830 G6 options		up to 16 GB LPDDR3-2133 (soldered)	Intel UHD Graphics 620	one M.2 2280 drive	Intel Wireless-AX 22260 (Wi-Fi 6 AX200) WLAN (802.11ax Bluetooth 5.1) optional Intel XMM 7360 LTE-Advanced Cat 9 WWAN or Intel XMM 7560 LTE-Advanced Pro Cat 16 WWAN		13.3" FHD WLED UWVA 1500:1 60 Hz 400 nits 72% NTSC 8 bits touch or 13.3" FHD WLED UWVA 2000:1 60 Hz 1000 nits 72% NTSC 8 bits touch Sure View or 13.3" UHD WLED UWVA 1400:1 60 Hz 550 nits 95% sRGB 8 bits (+2 FRC) touch	720p HD with IR	38 Wh or 56.2 Wh	

=== Tenth generation ===
This generation of EliteBook notebooks feature Intel Comet Lake and AMD Zen 2 Renoir processors. New features introduced in this generation include 5G NR WWAN. Elitebook 805 series G7, 800 series G7, 1030 G7 and 1040 G7 were announced in May 2020.

- EliteBook x360 830 G7: 13.3" mainstream convertible with Intel processor
- EliteBook 830 G7: 13.3" mainstream with Intel processor
- EliteBook 840 G7: 14.0" mainstream with Intel processor
- EliteBook 850 G7: 15.6" mainstream with Intel processor
- EliteBook 835 G7: 13.3" mainstream with AMD processor
- EliteBook 845 G7: 14.0" mainstream with AMD processor
- EliteBook 855 G7: 15.6" mainstream with AMD processor
- EliteBook x360 1030 G7: 13.3" lightweight convertible with Intel processor
- EliteBook x360 1040 G7: 14.0" lightweight convertible with Intel processor

Elite Dragonfly was updated with Intel 10th Generation processors at CES 2020 in January 2020.

- Elite Dragonfly: 13.3" ultra-lightweight convertible with Intel processor

Tenth generation (2020) specifications
Model	Platform	Dimensions	Weight ^{(min)}	CPU	Chipset	Memory	Graphics	Storage	Networking	Audio	Screen	Webcam	Battery	Operating system
EliteBook 830 G7	Comet Lake	30.78 x 20.46 x 1.79 cm (non-touch); 30.78 x 20.46 x 1.9 cm (touch)	1.23 kg (non-touch); 1.35 kg (touch)	10th Gen Intel Core: i5-10210U; i5-10310U; i7-10510U; i7-10610U; i7-10710U; i7-10810U			Intel UHD Premium			Bang & Olufsen with integrated dual stereo speakers and 3 multi array microphone				Windows 10 Pro 64 – HP recommends Windows 10 Pro for business; Windows 10 Pro 64 (National Academic only); Windows 10 Home 64; Windows 10 Home Single Language 64; Windows 10 Pro (Windows 10 Enterprise available with a Volume Licensing Agreement); FreeDOS
EliteBook 840 G7	Comet Lake	WLAN: 32.36 x 21.47 x 1.79 cm (non-touch); 32.36 x 21.47 x 1.91 cm (touch); WWAN: 32.36 x 21.47 x 1.91 cm (12.74 x 8.45 x 0.75 in)	1.33 kg (non-touch); 1.46 kg (touch)	10th Gen Intel Core: i5-10210U; i5-10310U; i7-10510U; i7-10610U; i7-10710U; i7-10810U			Intel UHD Premium			Bang & Olufsen with integrated dual stereo speakers and 3 multi array microphone				
EliteBook 850 G7	Comet Lake	WLAN: 35.97 x 23.38 x 1.92 cm (non-touch); 35.97 x 23.38 x 2.0 cm (touch); WWAN: 35.97 x 23.38 x 2.0 cm (14.16 x 9.20 x 0.79 in)		10th Gen Intel Core: i5-10210U; i5-10310U; i7-10510U; i7-10610U; i7-10710U; i7-10810U			Intel UHD Premium with NVIDIA GeForce MX250			Bang & Olufsen with integrated dual stereo speakers and 3 multi array microphone				
EliteBook 835 G7		WLAN: 30.78 x 20.46 x 1.7 cm (non-touch); 30.78 x 20.46 x 1.90 cm (touch); WWAN: 32.36 x 21.47 x 1.91 cm (12.74 x 8.45 x 0.75 in)	1.26 kg (non-touch); 1.37 kg (touch)	2nd Gen AMD Ryzen PRO 4000 Series: 3-4450U; 5-4650U; 7-4750U			AMD Radeon							
EliteBook 845 G7		WLAN: 32.36 x 21.47 x 1.79 cm (non-touch); 32.36 x 21.47 x 1.91 cm (touch); WWAN: 32.36 x 21.47 x 1.91 cm (12.74 x 8.45 x 0.75 in)	1.34 kg (non-touch); 1.47 kg (touch)											
EliteBook 855 G7														
EliteBook x360 1030 G7	Comet Lake			10th Gen Intel Core: i5-10210U; i5-10310U; i7-10510U; i7-10610U; i7-10710U; i7-10810U			Intel HD Premium							
EliteBook x360 1040 G7														
Elite Dragonfly														ChromeOS

=== Eleventh generation ===
This generation of EliteBook notebooks feature Intel Tiger Lake processors. EliteBook 800 series G8 was announced in December 2020. EliteBook 840 Aero G8, x360 1030 G8, and x360 1040 G8 with Intel processors, as well as EliteBook 805 G8 series with AMD processors were announced on CES 2021.

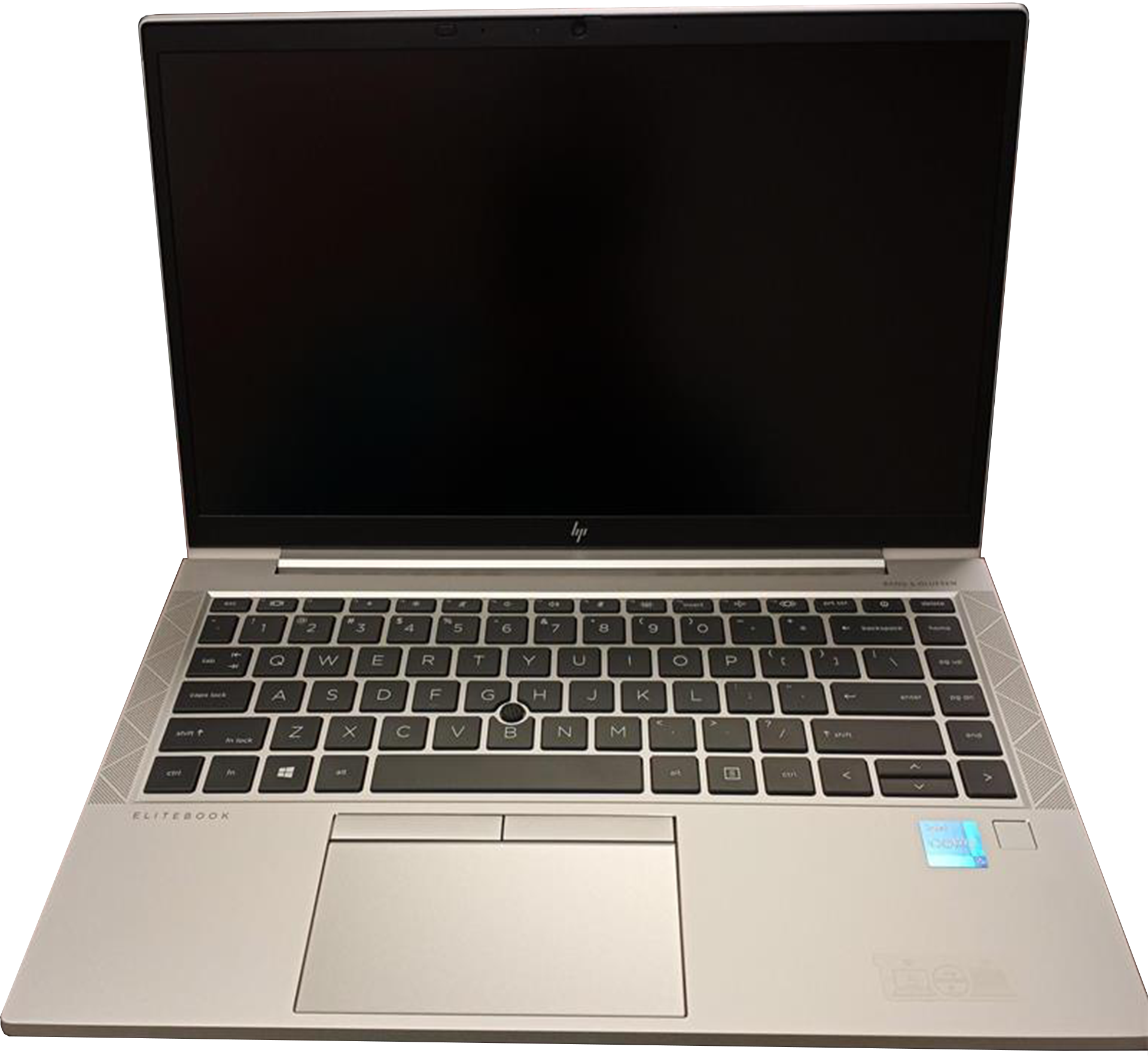
HP EliteBook 840 G8

The G8 was the final EliteBook generation to include a pointing stick and dedicated mouse-click buttons.

- EliteBook x360 830 G8: 13.3" mainstream convertible with Intel processor
- EliteBook 830 G8: 13.3" mainstream with Intel processor
- EliteBook 840 Aero G8: 14.0" with Intel processor
- EliteBook 840 G8: 14.0" mainstream with Intel processor
- EliteBook 850 G8: 15.6" mainstream with Intel processor
- EliteBook 835 G8: 13.3" mainstream with AMD processor
- EliteBook 845 G8: 14.0" mainstream with AMD processor
- EliteBook 855 G8: 15.6" mainstream with AMD processor
- EliteBook x360 1030 G8: 13.3" with Intel processor
- EliteBook x360 1040 G8: 14.0" with Intel processor

Other HP Elite notebook, tablet and accessory products are introduced at CES 2021.

- HP Elite Dragonfly G2
- HP Elite Dragonfly Max
- HP Elite Folio
- HP Elite x2 G8
- HP Elite Wireless Earbuds

==== HP Dev One ====
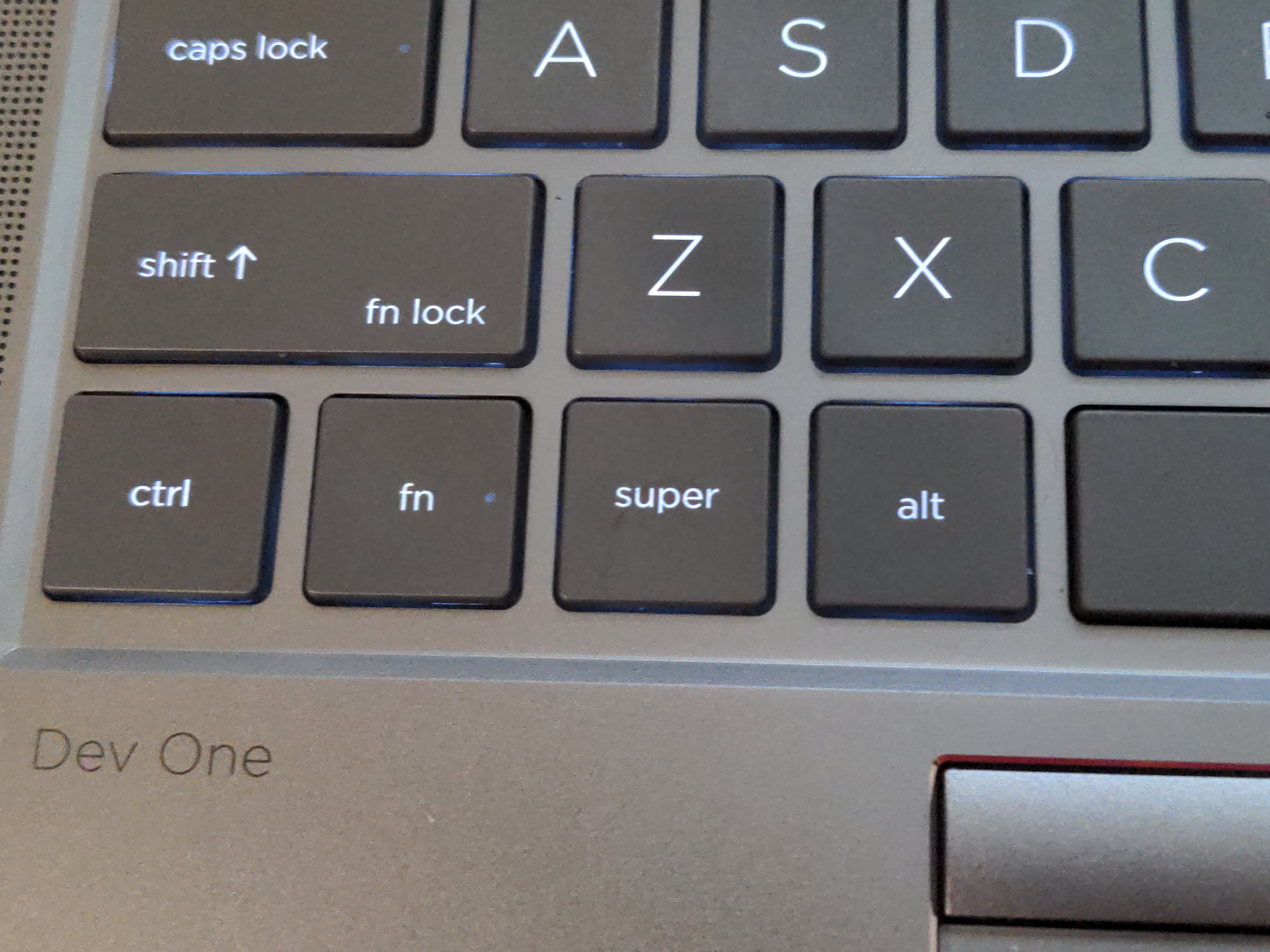
Super key on HP Dev One

HP Dev One is a Linux laptop designed by HP in collaboration with System76 and AMD, available since June 2022. HP Dev One's design is based on the HP EliteBook 845 G8. Pop! OS is preinstalled on the Dev One. The laptop is designed for software developers, and includes a Super key in place of the traditional Windows key. Additionally, the maximum display brightness is 1000 nits but premium-branded speaker technology is not included.

Eleventh generation (2021) specifications
Model	Platform	Dimensions	Weight ^{(min)}	CPU	Chipset	Memory	Graphics	Storage	Networking	Audio	Screen	Webcam	Battery	Operating system
EliteBook 830 G8	Tiger Lake	30.76 x 20.45 x 1.79 cm	1.35 kg (touch); 1.24 kg (non-touch)	11th Gen Intel Core with Intel Turbo Boost Technology: i5-1135G7; i5-1145G7; i7-1165G7; i7-1185G7			Intel Iris X^{e}			Bang & Olufsen with integrated dual stereo speakers and 3 multi array microphone			HP Long Life 3-cell, 53 Wh Li-ion	
EliteBook 840 G8	Tiger Lake			11th Gen Intel Core with Intel Turbo Boost Technology: i5-1135G7; i5-1145G7; i7-1165G7; i7-1185G7									HP Long Life 3-cell, 53 Wh Li-ion	
EliteBook 850 G8	Tiger Lake													
EliteBook 835 G8														
EliteBook 845 G8														
EliteBook 855 G8														
EliteBook x360 830 G8	Tiger Lake			11th Gen Intel Core										
EliteBook x360 1030 G8	Tiger Lake			11th Gen Intel Core										
EliteBook x360 1040 G8	Tiger Lake			11th Gen Intel Core										

=== Twelfth generation ===
This generation of EliteBook notebooks feature Intel Alder Lake processors. EliteBook 800 series G9 was announced in January 2022. The EliteBook 800 G9 series with Intel processors and EliteBook 805 G9 series with AMD processors were announced at CES 2022. This generation also brings the previous ProBook 600 and ProBook 605 series into the EliteBook lineup. Notably in this generation, the word "Book" was dropped from the two 360-degree rotatable 2-in-1 models. Instead they were renamed to just "HP Elite x360 830 G9" and "HP Elite x360 1040 G9". Also absent in this generation is a 13" version of the more premium 1000-series line, which would have succeeded last generation's HP EliteBook x360 1030 G8.

- HP EliteBook 630 G9: 13.3" with Intel processor
- HP EliteBook 640 G9: 14.0" with Intel processor
- HP EliteBook 650 G9: 15.6" with Intel processor
- HP EliteBook 635 G9: 13.3" with AMD processor
- HP EliteBook 645 G9: 14.0" with AMD Processor
- HP EliteBook 655 G9: 15.6" with AMD processor
- HP EliteBook 830 G9: 13.3" mainstream with Intel processor
- HP Elite x360 830 G9: 13.3" mainstream convertible with Intel processor
- HP EliteBook 840 G9: 14.0" mainstream with Intel processor
- HP EliteBook 860 G9: 16.0" mainstream with Intel processor
- HP EliteBook 835 G9: 13.3" mainstream with AMD processor
- HP EliteBook 845 G9: 14.0" mainstream with AMD Processor
- HP EliteBook 865 G9: 16.0" mainstream with AMD processor
- HP EliteBook 1040 G9: 14.0" premium with Intel processor
- HP Elite x360 1040 G9: 14.0" premium convertible with Intel processor

Other HP Elite notebook, tablet and accessory products introduced at CES 2022.

- HP Elite Dragonfly G3: 13.5" business premium with Intel processor
- HP Elite Dragonfly Chromebook: Premium business Chromebook with Intel processor
- HP Elite Dragonfly Chromebook Enterprise: Premium business Chromebook with Intel processor

Twelfth generation (2022) specifications
Model	Platform	Dimensions	Weight ^{(min)}	CPU	Chipset	Memory	Graphics	Storage	Networking	Audio	Screen	Webcam	Battery	Operating system
EliteBook 630 G9	Alder Lake	30.69 x 20.84 x 1.59 cm (12.08 x 8.2 x 0.62 in)	1.28 kg (2.82 lb)	12th Gen Intel Core				256 or 512 GB/1 or 2 TB SSD				720p HD with Temporal Noise Reduction; 720p HD camera+IR Camera with Temporal Noise Reduction for face authentication with Windows Hello		
EliteBook 640 G9	Alder Lake	32.19 x 21.39 x 1.99 cm (12.67 x 8.42 x 0.78 in)	1.37 kg (3.03 lb)											
EliteBook 650 G9	Alder Lake	35.94 x 23.39 x 1.99 cm (14.15 x 9.20 x 0.78 in)	1.74 kg (3.83 lb)											
EliteBook 635 G9				AMD Ryzen 5000 Series: 3-5425U; 5-5625U			AMD Radeon							
EliteBook 645 G9														
EliteBook 655 G9														
EliteBook 830 G9	Alder Lake			12th Gen Intel Core										
EliteBook 840 G9	Alder Lake			12th Gen Intel Core										
EliteBook 860 G9	Alder Lake			12th Gen Intel Core										
EliteBook 1040 G9	Alder Lake			12th Gen Intel Core										
EliteBook 635 G9														
EliteBook 645 G9														
EliteBook 655 G9														
EliteBook 835 G9														
EliteBook 845 G9														
EliteBook 865 G9														
Elite x360 830 G9	Alder Lake			12th Gen Intel Core										
Elite x360 1040 G9	Alder Lake			12th Gen Intel Core										
Elite Dragonfly G3	Alder Lake			12th Gen Intel Core										

=== Thirteenth generation ===
Announced at CES 2023. HP Elite Dragonfly was renamed to HP Dragonfly. These contain Intel's 13th-gen Raptor Lake mobile processors and AMD's Zen 4-based Phoenix CPUs.

- HP EliteBook 630 G10: 13.3" with Intel processor
- HP EliteBook 640 G10: 14.0" with Intel processor
- HP EliteBook 650 G10: 15.6" with Intel processor
- HP EliteBook 645 G10: 14.0" with AMD Processor
- HP EliteBook 655 G10: 15.6" with AMD processor
- HP EliteBook 830 G10: 13.3" mainstream with Intel processor
- HP Elite x360 830 G10: 13.3" mainstream convertible (360-degree rotatable 2-in-1) with Intel processor
- HP EliteBook 840 G10: 14.0" mainstream with Intel processor
- HP EliteBook 860 G10: 16.0" mainstream with Intel processor
- HP EliteBook 835 G10: 13.3" mainstream with AMD processor
- HP EliteBook 845 G10: 14.0" mainstream with AMD Processor
- HP EliteBook 865 G10: 16.0" mainstream with AMD processor
- HP EliteBook 1040 G10: 14.0" premium with Intel processor
- HP Elite x360 1040 G10: 14.0" premium convertible (360-degree rotatable 2-in-1) with Intel processor

Thirteenth generation (2023) specifications
Model	Platform	Dimensions	Weight ^{(min)}	CPU	Chipset	Memory	Graphics	Storage	Audio	Networking	Screen	Webcam	Battery	Operating system
EliteBook 630 G10	Raptor Lake	30.69 x 20.84 x 1.59 cm (12.08 x 8.20 x 0.62 in)	1.22 kg (2.7 lb)	13th Gen Intel Core										
EliteBook 640 G10	Raptor Lake			13th Gen Intel Core										
EliteBook 650 G10	Raptor Lake			13th Gen Intel Core										
EliteBook 830 G10	Raptor Lake			13th Gen Intel Core										
EliteBook 840 G10	Raptor Lake			13th Gen Intel Core										
EliteBook 860 G10	Raptor Lake			13th Gen Intel Core										
EliteBook 1040 G10	Raptor Lake			13th Gen Intel Core										
EliteBook 645 G10														

=== Fourteenth generation ===
Announced at Amplify event in March 2024. These contain Intel's 1st-gen "Core Ultra" Meteor Lake mobile processors and also AMD processors for the models ending in 5. Note that AMD uses Zen 4 Phoenix CPUs in the 800 and higher series, but Zen 3 Rembrandt-R CPUs in the 600 series.

- HP EliteBook 630 G11: 13.3" with Intel processor
- HP EliteBook 640 G11: 14.0" with Intel processor
- HP EliteBook 660 G11: 16.0" with Intel processor
- HP EliteBook 645 G11: 14.0" with AMD Processor
- HP EliteBook 665 G11: 16.0" with AMD processor
- HP EliteBook 830 G11: 13.3" mainstream with Intel processor
- HP Elite x360 830 G11: 13.3" mainstream convertible (360-degree rotatable 2-in-1) with Intel processor
- HP EliteBook 840 G11: 14.0" mainstream with Intel processor
- HP EliteBook 860 G11: 16.0" mainstream with Intel processor
- HP EliteBook 835 G11: 13.3" mainstream with AMD processor
- HP EliteBook 845 G11: 14.0" mainstream with AMD Processor
- HP EliteBook 865 G11: 16.0" mainstream with AMD processor
- HP EliteBook 1040 G11: 14.0" premium with Intel processor
- HP Elite x360 1040 G11: 14.0" premium convertible (360-degree rotatable 2-in-1) with Intel processor
- HP Dragonfly Pro Chromebook
- HP Dragonfly Pro
- HP Dragonfly G4

Fourteenth generation (2024) specifications
Model	Platform	Dimensions	Weight ^{(min)}	CPU	Chipset	Memory	Graphics	Storage	Networking	Audio	Screen	Webcam	Battery	Operating system
EliteBook 630 G11	Meteor Lake	30.31 x 21.51 x 1.09 cm (11.93 x 8.47 x 0.43 in)	56 Wh battery: 1.31 kg (2.90 lb); 48 Wh battery: 1.29 kg (2.86 lb)	Intel Core Ultra 5/7 U Series		64 GB DDR5-5600 MT/s RAM		256 GB	Intel Wi-Fi 6E AX211 (2x2) and Bluetooth 5.3; Intel I219-LM GbE, vPro; HP 4G LTE-A Pro CAT16 WWAN eSIM; Qualcomm 9205 LTE-M (CAT-M1 fSVC)	Poly Studio with integrated stereo speakers and dual array microphone	13.3	5 MP camera; IR Camera (select models); FHD camera (select models)	HP Long Life 3-cell, 56 Wh Li-ion polymer; HP Long Life 3-cell, 48 Wh Li-ion polymer	Windows 11
EliteBook 640 G11	Meteor Lake			Intel Core Ultra 5/7 H and U Series		64 GB DDR5-5600 MT/s RAM								
EliteBook 660 G11	Meteor Lake		1.75 kg (3.86 lb)	Intel Core Ultra 5/7 H and U Series										

=== Fifteenth generation ===
In 2025, HP restructured its EliteBook naming scheme, discontinuing the previous three-digit-plus-generation numbering (e.g. 830/840/860 Gxx) in favor of two consolidated series, HP EliteBook 6 and HP EliteBook 8, each offered in 13.3", 14" and 16" sizes. Within each series, a letter suffix denotes the processor platform: "i" for Intel Core Ultra processors, "a" for AMD Ryzen processors, and "q" for Qualcomm Snapdragon processors (EliteBook 6 only), while the leading digit indicates the sub-generation. First-generation models (G1i/G1a) use Intel Core Ultra 200-series ("Arrow Lake") or AMD Ryzen PRO 200-series processors. Second-generation models (G2i/G2a/G2q), marketed as "Next Gen AI PC" Copilot+ PCs, use Intel Core Ultra Series 3 ("Panther Lake"), AMD Ryzen AI 300-series, or Qualcomm Snapdragon X2 processors. The 360-degree convertible line, previously sold as Elite x360, was renamed EliteBook Flip.

- HP EliteBook 6 (Intel): 13.3", 14.0" or 16.0" with Intel Core Ultra processor (G1i/G2i)
- HP EliteBook 6 (AMD): 14.0" or 16.0" with AMD Ryzen processor (G1a/G2a)
- HP EliteBook 6 (Qualcomm): 14.0" with Qualcomm Snapdragon X2 processor (G2q)
- HP EliteBook 8 (Intel): 13.3", 14.0" or 16.0" with Intel Core Ultra processor (G1i/G2i)
- HP EliteBook 8 Flip (Intel): 13.3" convertible with Intel Core Ultra processor (G1i/G2i)
- HP EliteBook 8 (AMD): 13.3", 14.0" or 16.0" with AMD Ryzen processor (G1a/G2a)

== Reception ==
The HP Elitebook line has been positively received, with PC Mag giving the 6930p notebook a four out of five star review, noting its performance in all-around computing, but giving higher praise to the Thinkpad T400. The 2730p Tablet PC was well received by GottaBeMobile, but noted shortcomings in its speakers, buttons, and latches. Notebook Review called the 8530w mobile workstations "one of the most impressive workstation-class 15.4" notebooks", and Desktop Engineering found that, "In terms of price, performance, and portability, the HP EliteBook 8530w is a winner."

Geek.com commented: "In summary, you can't go wrong with the EliteBook 8540p (or the 8xx0 series for that matter). With this flagship business line HP has combined good looks, ruggedness, high performance, and tons of features into one extremely attractive package." IT Reviews said that the 8540p's "relatively high screen resolution is a real draw, and we found the keyboard to be well made and easy to use at full touch-typing speed". However, the site also noted that "it is big and heavy and so not designed for portability, though. And it is expensive too."

The EliteBook 8440p received praise from V3.co.uk for its "attractive and robust design" as well as a "powerful processor" and "good range of features", but the review also noted that the overall appeal of the laptop was diminished by "poor battery life" and HP's choice of 32-bit Windows.

A review by AnandTech gave high scores to the HP EliteBook 8740w with the DreamColor 2 LCD, but noted a somewhat high price tag on built-to-order machines.

== See also ==
- HP ZBook
- Dell Latitude and Precision
- Lenovo ThinkPad
- Toshiba Portégé
- Acer TravelMate
- ASUS ExpertBook
- List of Hewlett-Packard products
