= HP ProBook =

Laptop line manufactured by Hewlett-Packard

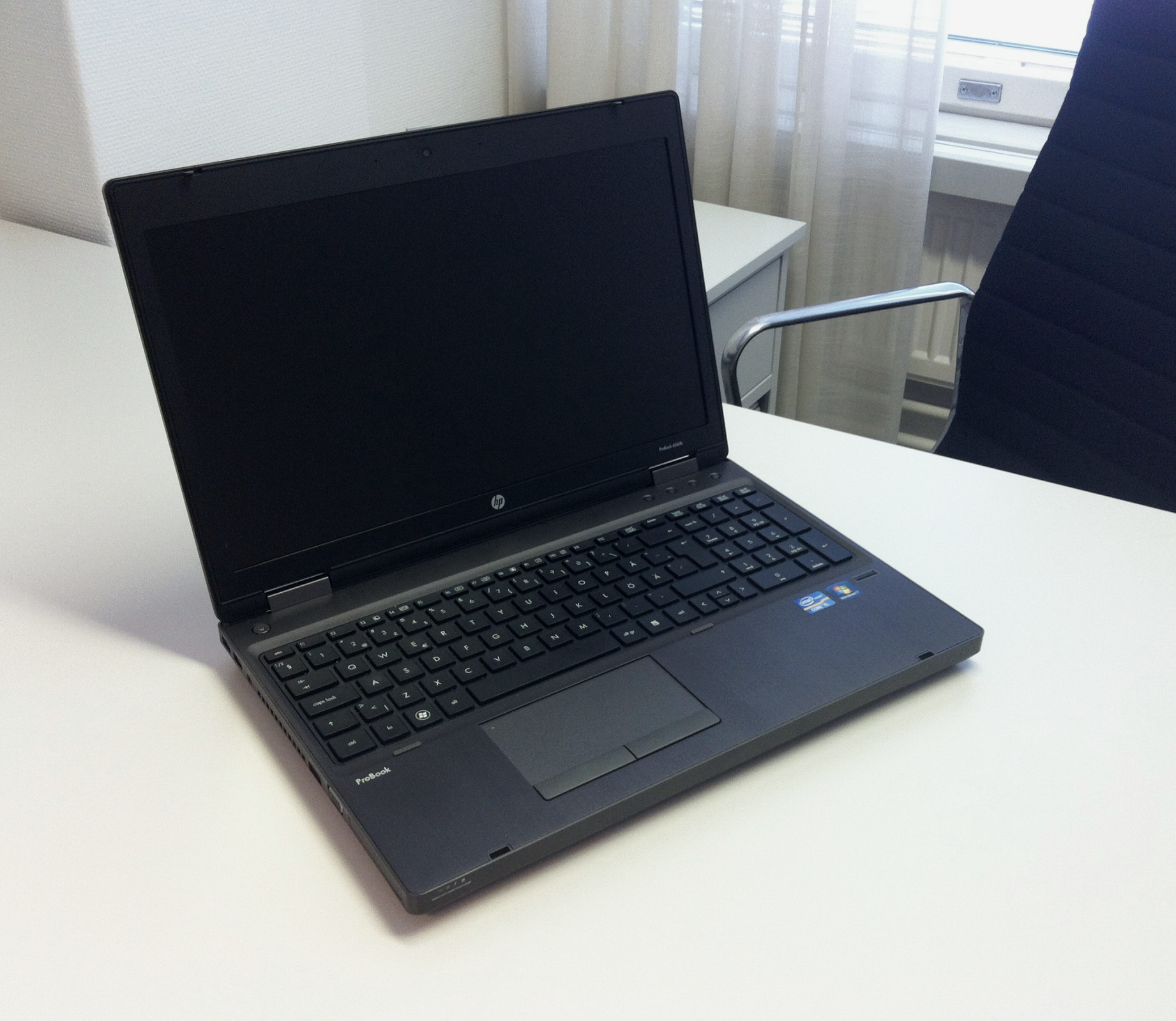
- 2011's HP ProBook 6560b 15"
- Developer: Hewlett-Packard (2009–2015); HP Inc. (2015–present)
- Manufacturer: Hewlett-Packard (2009–2015); HP Inc. (2015–present)
- Type: Laptop
- Released: April 28, 2009; 17 years ago
- Operating system: Windows
- CPU: AMD, Intel
- Graphics: AMD, Nvidia, Intel
- Marketing target: Business
- Predecessor: HP Compaq (B and S series)
- Related: HP EliteBook

The HP ProBook is a line of laptop computers aimed towards businesses, originally produced by Hewlett-Packard and later by its successor, HP Inc., with a list price lower than that of HP's higher-end EliteBook series. At its introduction in 2009, HP sold both business-oriented desktops and laptops under the HP Compaq and HP ProBook brands respectively from 2009 to 2013.

== History ==
=== S-Series (discontinued in 2012) ===
In April 2009, HP introduced the ProBook s-series (standard/essential) notebooks, which consisted of the Intel powered 4410s, 4510s, and 4710s (14", 15.6", and 17.3" screens, respectively) and the AMD powered 4415s and 4515s (14" and 15.6" screens, respectively). This was followed by the introduction of the 13.3" ProBook 4310s in June of the same year.

The s-series was updated in 2010 with Intel Core i3, i5, and i7 processors, a brushed aluminium case, chiclet keyboard, and multitouch ClickPad. Updates to the line in 2012 included a new exterior aluminium design.

==== 4x1xs ====
Model	CPU				Graphics	RAM	Storage	Screen		Audio	Battery	Operating system	Weight (kg)
Model	CPU				Graphics	RAM	Storage	Size (in)	Resolution (pixels)	Audio	Battery	Operating system	Weight (kg)
Model	Model	Cores	GHz	Cache	Graphics	RAM	Storage	Size (in)	Resolution (pixels)	Audio	Battery	Operating system	Weight (kg)
ProBook 4310s	Intel Core 2 Duo T6670	2	2.2		Intel Graphics Media Accelerator 4500MHD	3 GB		13.3	1366x768	HD Audio			2.06
ProBook 4311s	Intel Core 2 Duo P7570	2	2.26		ATI Mobility Radeon HD 4330	2 GB		13.3	1366x768				1.97
ProBook 4410s	Intel Core 2 Duo T6570	2	2.1		ATI Mobility Radeon HD 4330	2 GB		14	1366x768				2.27
ProBook 4411s	Intel Core 2 Duo P7370	2	2		ATI Mobility Radeon HD 4330	3 GB		14	1366x768				2.3
ProBook 4510s	Intel Core 2 Duo T6570	2	2.1		Intel Graphics Media Accelerator 4500M	2 GB		15.6	1366x768				2.48
ProBook 4710s	Intel Core 2 Duo P8700	2	2.53		AMD Mobility Radeon HD 4330	3 GB		17.3	1600x900				3.08
ProBook 4415s	AMD Athlon II M320	2	2.1		ATI Radeon HD 4200	2 GB		14	1366x768				2.27
ProBook 4416s	AMD Turion X2 RM-74	2	2.2		ATI Radeon HD 4330	2 GB		14	1366x768				2.27
ProBook 4515s	AMD Turion X2 Ultra ZM-86	2	2.4		ATI Radeon HD 3200	3 GB		15.6	1366x768				2.6

==== 4x2xs ====
Model		CPU				Graphics	RAM	Storage	Audio	Screen		Battery	Operating system	Weight (kg)
Model		Model	Cores	GHz	Cache	Graphics	RAM	Storage	Audio	Size (in)	Resolution (pixels)	Battery	Operating system	Weight (kg)
ProBook 4320s		Intel Core i3-380M	2	2.53		Intel Graphics Media Accelerator HD	3 GB		ADI High Definition	13.3	1366 x 768		Windows 7 Pro	2.02
ProBook 4321s		Intel Core i5-520M	2	2.4		ATI Mobility Radeon HD 4530	4 GB			13.3	1366 x 768			2.2
ProBook 4420s		Intel Core i3-370M	2	2.4		Intel HM57 Express Chipset	4 GB			13.8	1366 x 768			2.2
ProBook 4421s		Intel Core i7-620M	2	2.6		ATI Mobility Radeon HD 4530	2 GB			14	1366 x 768			2.2
ProBook 4520s		Intel Core i3-380M	2	2.53		Intel Graphics Media Accelerator HD	3GB			15.6	1366 x 768			2.39
ProBook 4720s		Intel Core i3-380M	2	2.53		Intel Graphics Media Accelerator HD	3GB			17.3	1600 x 900			2.97
ProBook 4325s		AMD V120	1	2.2		ATI Mobility Radeon HD 4250	1 GB			13.3	1366 x 768			2.15
ProBook 4326s		Intel Core i3-330M	2	2.53		Intel Graphics Media Accelerator HD	4 GB			13.3	1366 x 768			2.02
ProBook 4425s	WZ223UT	AMD Phenom II X4 P920	4	1.6		ATI Mobility Radeon HD 4530	4 GB			14	1366 x 768			2.3
ProBook 4525s	WT231EA	AMD Athlon II P340	2	2.2		ATI Mobility Radeon HD 530v	4 GB			15.6	1366 x 768			2.5

==== 4x3xs ====
- ProBook 4230s
- ProBook 4330s
- ProBook 4331s
- ProBook 4430s
- ProBook 4431s
- ProBook 4520s
- ProBook 4530s
- ProBook 4730s
- ProBook 4435s
- ProBook 4436s
- ProBook 4535s

Model	CPU				Graphics	RAM	Storage	Audio	Screen		Battery	Operating system	Weight (kg)
Model	Model	Cores	GHz	Cache	Graphics	RAM	Storage	Audio	Size (in)	Resolution (pixels)	Battery	Operating system	Weight (kg)
ProBook 4230s	Intel Core i5-2430M	2	2.4		Intel HD Graphics 3000	4 GB			12.1	1820 x 800			1.6
ProBook 4330s	Intel Core i3-2350M	2			Intel HD Graphics 3000								
ProBook 4331s													
ProBook 4430s													
ProBook 4431s													
ProBook 4435s													
ProBook 4436s													
ProBook 4520s													
ProBook 4530s													
ProBook 4535s													
ProBook 4730s													

==== 4x4xs ====
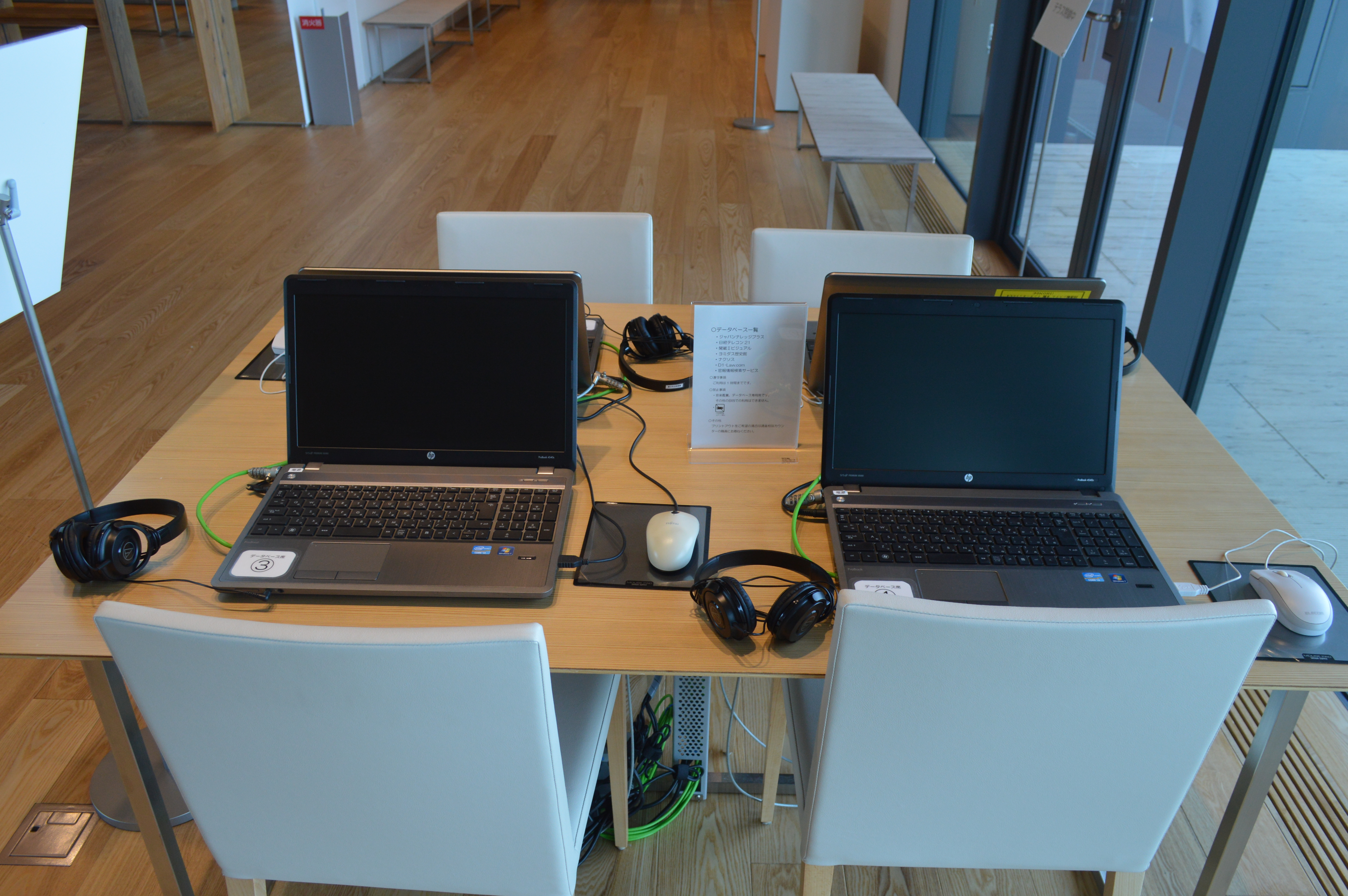
Two 2012's 4540s ProBooks 15"

- ProBook 4340s
- ProBook 4341s
- ProBook 4440s
- ProBook 4441s
- ProBook 4540s
- ProBook 4740s
- ProBook 4445s
- ProBook 4446s
- ProBook 4545s

Model	CPU				Graphics	RAM	Storage	Audio	Screen		Battery	Operating system	Weight (kg)
Model	Model	Cores	GHz	Cache	Graphics	RAM	Storage	Audio	Size (in)	Resolution (pixels)	Battery	Operating system	Weight (kg)
ProBook 4340s	Intel Core i5-3230M							SRS Premium Sound	13.3	1366 x 768			1,84
ProBook 4341s	Intel Core i5-3210m	2	2.5GHz	3MB L3	Radeon HD 7570M	4GB	500GB	SRS Premium Sound	13.3	1366 x 768		Windows 8 Pro	2,04
ProBook 4440s													
ProBook 4441s													
ProBook 4445s													
ProBook 4446s													
ProBook 4540s													
ProBook 4545s													
ProBook 4740s													

=== B-Series (discontinued in 2012) ===
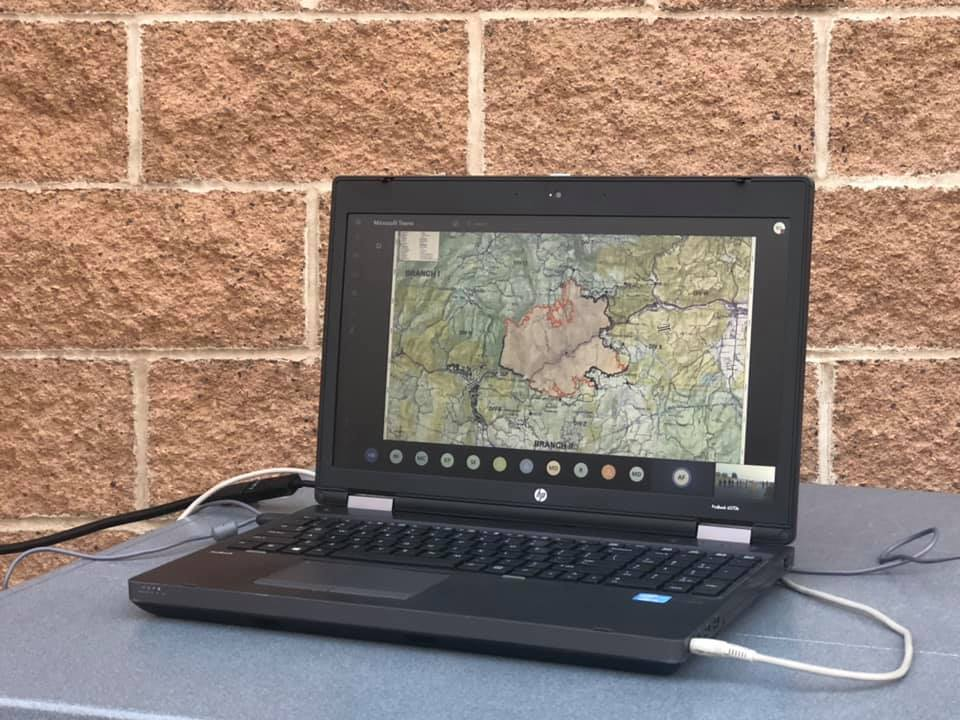
2012's HP ProBook 6570b 15"

The ProBook B-series was announced on October 13, 2009, replacing the previous HP Compaq B-series with similar design in early models. All models still have a CD drive bay, docking port, pointstick options, screen latches, draining holes, easy-replaceable battery with additional slice options, TPM chip, socketed CPU, WLAN options and two RAM slots.

Two AMD powered models were announced in 2009 — the 14" ProBook 6445b and the 15.6" ProBook 6545b; Their Intel powered counterparts were announced three months later as the 14" ProBook 6440b and the 15.6" ProBook 6540b. The next-year upgrade is an AMD-powered 6455b and 6555b, and Intel-based 6450b and 6550b.

The B-series design was updated in 2011 with the Intel-powered 6460b and 6560b, and the AMD-powered 6465b and in 2012 with the Intel-powered 6470b and 6570b, and the AMD-powered 6475b. The updated sibling EliteBook line had an additional magnesium frame under screen top lid, the keyboard LED-backlight, the aluminium bottom-cover, the 17" workstation version and the additional security options.

==== 6x4xb ====
- ProBook 6440b
- ProBook 6540b
- ProBook 6445b
- ProBook 6545b

==== 6x5xb ====
- ProBook 6450b
- ProBook 6550b
- ProBook 6455b
- ProBook 6555b

==== 6x6xb ====
- ProBook 6360b
- ProBook 6460b
- ProBook 6560b
- ProBook 6465b
- ProBook 6565b

==== 6x7xb ====
- ProBook 6470b
- ProBook 6570b
- ProBook 6475b

Model	CPU				Graphics	RAM	Storage	Audio	Screen		Battery	Operating system	Weight (kg)
Model	Model	Cores	GHz	Cache	Graphics	RAM	Storage	Audio	Size (in)	Resolution (pixels)	Battery	Operating system	Weight (kg)
ProBook 6360b													
ProBook 6440b	Intel Core i5/i7												
ProBook 6445b	AMD Turion II M320	2	2.1	1MB	Radeon HD 4200	2GB	160GB HDD		14	1366x768		Windows 7 Professional	

=== M-Series (discontinued in 2011) ===
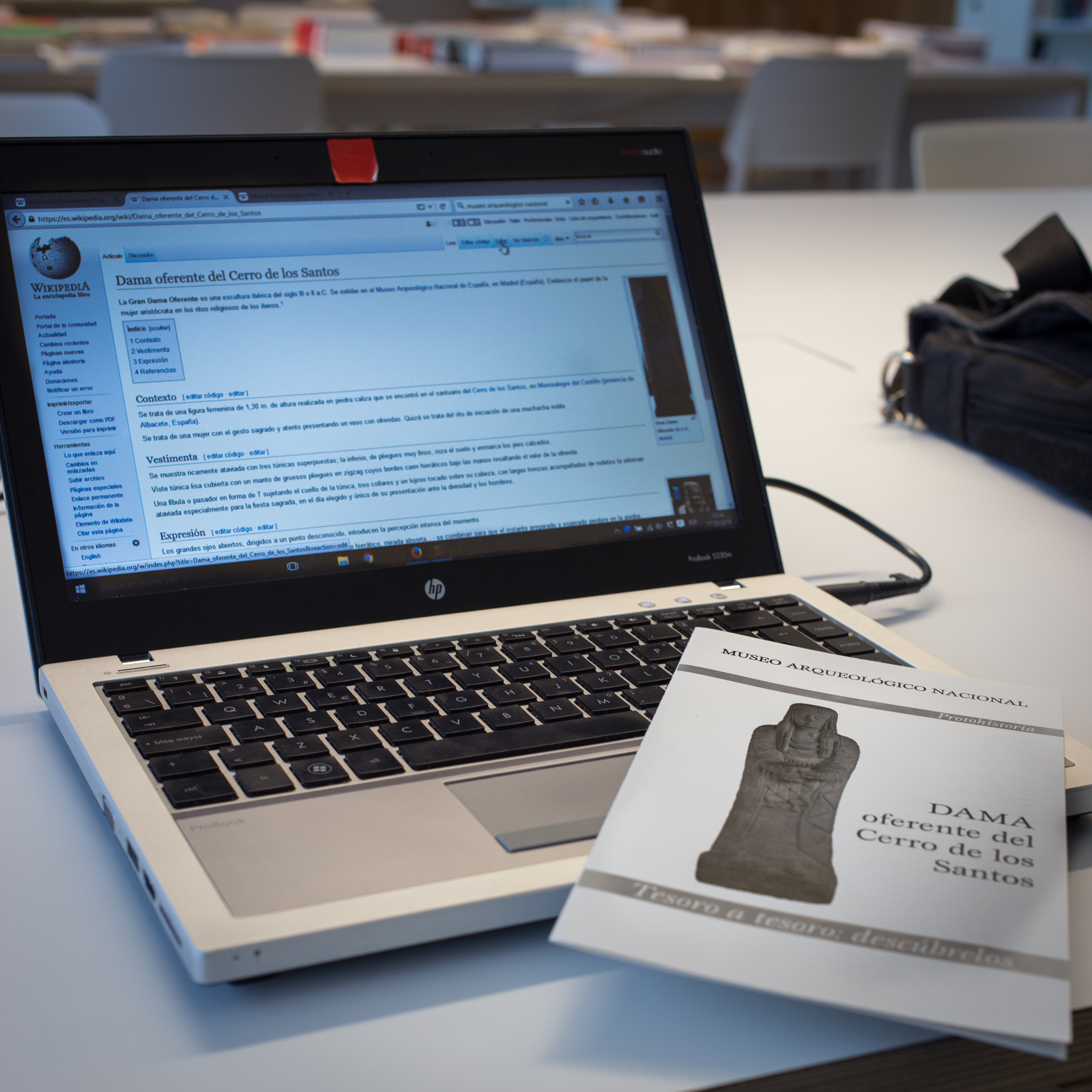
2011's ProBook 5330m 13"

HP launched the 5310m in September 2009 as a line of compact mid-range 12" and 13" ProBooks without CD-drive bay. The 5310m was enclosed by an aluminium and magnesium case, weighed under four pounds, and was less than an inch thick.

The M-series was updated in September 2010 with a 5320m, closely followed by the release of the 5330m in May 2011 which featured a dual-tone aluminium chassis and Beats Audio.

==== 5x1xm ====
- ProBook 5310m

==== 5x2xm ====
- ProBook 5220m
- ProBook 5320m

==== 5x3xm ====
- ProBook 5330m

Model	CPU				Graphics	RAM	Storage	Audio	Screen		Battery	Operating system	Weight (kg)
Model	Model	Cores	GHz	Cache	Graphics	RAM	Storage	Audio	Size (in)	Resolution (pixels)	Battery	Operating system	Weight (kg)
ProBook 5220m	Intel Celeron U3400				Intel HD Graphics								
ProBook 5310m													
ProBook 5320m													
ProBook 5330m													

=== G-Series ===
HP launched the G0 series in 2013. The computers are enclosed in an aluminium and magnesium case. The G1 series succeeded in 2014.

The first digit is a class of laptop (4## — entry, 6## — mid-class models), second digit is a display size (#3# for 13.3", #4# for 14.1", #5# for 15.6" and #7# for 17.3"). The third is an additional mark, like a ##5 for AMD-based model.

==== G0 ====
These are the ProBooks that have been released in Generation 0.

Model	CPU	Graphics		RAM (max)	Storage	Audio	Screen		Battery	Operating system	Weight (kg)
Model	CPU	Integrated	Discrete	RAM (max)	Storage	Audio	Size (in)	Resolution (pixels)	Battery	Operating system	Weight (kg)
ProBook 440 G0	Intel Core 3rd Gen	Intel HD Graphics 4000 (3rd Generation Intel configurations)	AMD Radeon HD 8750M	16 GB			14	1366 x 768			1.97
ProBook 440 G0	Intel Pentium 2020M	Intel HD Graphics (Celeron and Pentium configurations)	AMD Radeon HD 8750M	16 GB			14	1366 x 768			1.97
ProBook 440 G0	Intel Celeron 1000M	Intel HD Graphics (Celeron and Pentium configurations)	AMD Radeon HD 8750M	16 GB			14	1366 x 768			1.97
ProBook 450 G0	Intel Core 3rd Generation	Intel HD Graphics 4000 (3rd Generation Intel configurations)	AMD Radeon HD 8750M	16 GB			15.6	1366 x 768			2.4
ProBook 450 G0	Intel Pentium 2020M	Intel HD Graphics (Celeron and Pentium configurations)	AMD Radeon HD 8750M	16 GB			15.6	1366 x 768			2.4
ProBook 450 G0	Intel Celeron 1000M	Intel HD Graphics (Celeron and Pentium configurations)	AMD Radeon HD 8750M	16 GB			15.6	1366 x 768			2.4
ProBook 470 G0	Intel Core 3rd Generation	Intel HD Graphics 4000 (3rd Generation Intel configurations)	AMD Radeon HD 8750M	16 GB			17.3	1366 x 768			3
ProBook 470 G0	Intel Pentium 2020M	Intel HD Graphics (Celeron and Pentium configurations)	AMD Radeon HD 8750M	16 GB			17.3	1366 x 768			3
ProBook 470 G0	Intel Celeron 1000M	Intel HD Graphics (Celeron and Pentium configurations)	AMD Radeon HD 8750M	16 GB			17.3	1366 x 768			3

==== G1 ====
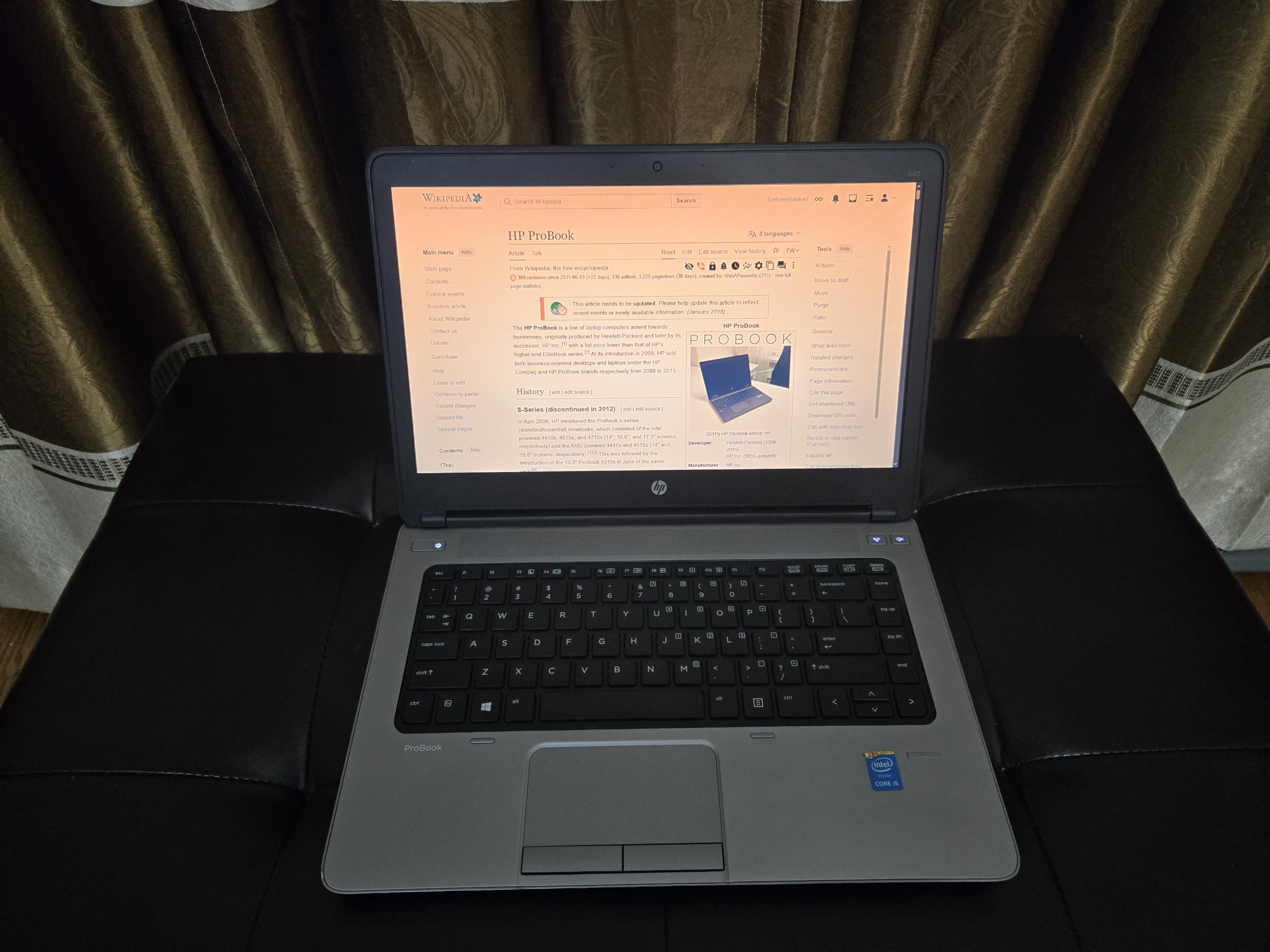
ProBook 640 G1

This line has low-end siblings (15.6" HP 350 G1 and 14.1" HP 340 G1). The 4## models is entry line. 6## is a mid-range modes with aluminum and magnesium case.

Model	CPU				Graphics	RAM	Storage	Audio	Screen		Battery	Operating system	Weight (kg)	
Model	Model	Cores	GHz	Cache	Graphics	RAM	Storage	Audio	Size (in)	Resolution (pixels)	Battery	Operating system	Weight (kg)	
ProBook x360 11 G1 EE	Intel Pentium N4200	4	1.1		Intel HD Graphics 500	4 GB	256 GB SSD		11.6	1366 x 768			Non-Touch	1.35
ProBook x360 11 G1 EE	Intel Pentium N4200	4	1.1		Intel HD Graphics 500	4 GB	256 GB SSD		11.6	1366 x 768			Touch	1.45
ProBook 430 G1	Intel Core i5-4200U	2	1.6		Intel HD Graphics 4400	4 GB	500 HDD		13.3	1366 x 768			1.6	
ProBook 440 G1	Intel Core i5-4200M	2	2.5		Intel HD Graphics 4600	4 GB	500 HDD		14	1366 x 768			2.1	
ProBook 445 G1	AMD A6-5350M	2	2.9		AMD Radeon HD 8450G	4 GB	320 GB		14	1366 x 768			1.9	
ProBook 450 G1	Intel Core i5-4200M	2	2.5		Intel HD Graphics 4600	4 GB	500 GB		15.6	1366 x 768			2.3	
ProBook 455 G1	AMD A8-4500M	4	1.9		AMD Radeon HD 8750M	4 GB	720 GB		15.6	1366 x 768			2.3	
ProBook 470 G1	Intel Core i5-4200M	2	2.5		AMD Radeon HD 8750M	4 GB	500 GB or 1 TB		17.3	1600 x 900			2.87	
ProBook 640 G1	Intel Core i5-4200M	2	2.5		Intel HD Graphics 4600	4 GB	500 GB or 1 TB		14	1366 x 768			2	
ProBook 645 G1	AMD A6-4400M	2	2.7		AMD Radeon HD 7520G	4 GB	500 GB or 1 TB		14	1366 x 768			2	
ProBook 650 G1	Intel Core i5-4200M	2	2.5		Intel HD Graphics 4600	4 GB	500 GB or 1 TB		15.6	1366 x 768			2.32	
ProBook 655 G1	AMD A6 A6-4400M	2	2.7		AMD Radeon HD 7520G	4 GB	500 GB or 1 TB		15.6	1920 x 1080			2.32	
Pro x2 410 G1	Intel Core i5-4202Y	4	1.6		Intel HD Graphics 4200	4 GB	256 GB SSD		11.6	1366 x 768			1.6	
Pro x2 612 G1	Intel Core i3-4012Y	2	1.5		Intel HD Graphics 4200	4 GB	128 GB HDD		12.5	1366 x 768			0.95	

==== G2 ====
These are the ProBooks that have been released in Generation 2.

Model	CPU				RAM	Graphics	Storage	Audio	Screen		Battery	Operating system	Weight (kg)
Model	Model	Cores	GHz	Cache	RAM	Graphics	Storage	Audio	Size (in)	Resolution (pixels)	Battery	Operating system	Weight (kg)
ProBook x360 11 G2 EE	Intel Core M3-7Y30	2	1		4 GB	Intel HD Graphics 615	128 GB SSD		11.6	1366 x 768			1.45
ProBook 430 G2	Intel Core i5-4210U	2	1.7		4 GB	Intel HD Graphics 4400	128 GB SSD		13.3	1366 x 768			1.5
ProBook 440 G2	Intel Core i5 5200U	2	2.2		4 GB	Intel HD Graphics 5500	500 HDD		14	1366 x 768			1.8
ProBook 445 G2	AMD A10-7300	4	1.9		8 GB	AMD Radeon R6	1000 HDD		14	1366 x 768			1.8
ProBook 450 G2	Intel Core i7-5500U	2	2.4		8 GB	Intel HD Graphics 4400	1000 HDD		15.6	1366 x 768			2.1
ProBook 455 G2	AMD A6 Pro-7050B	2	2.2		4 GB	AMD Radeon R4	500 HDD		15.6	1366 x 768			2.23
ProBook 470 G2	Intel Core i7-4510U	2	2		8 GB	Intel HD Graphics 4400	750 HDD		17.3	1920 x 1080			2.84
ProBook 470 G2	Intel Core i7-4510U	2	2		8 GB	AMD Radeon R5 M255	750 HDD		17.3	1920 x 1080			2.84
ProBook 640 G2	Intel Core i5-6300U	2	2.4		8 GB	Intel HD Graphics 520	256 GB SSD		14	1920 x 1080			1.95
ProBook 645 G2	AMD A6-8500B	2	1.6		8 GB	AMD Radeon R5	500 HDD		14	1366 x 768			1.95
ProBook 650 G2	Intel Core i5-6300U	2	2.4		8 GB	Intel HD Graphics 520	500 HDD		15.6	1366 x 768			2.31
ProBook 655 G2	AMD A6-8700B	4	1.8		8 GB	AMD Radeon R6	128 SSD		15.6	1920 x 1080			2.31
Pro x2 410 G2	Intel Core M3-7Y30	4	1		8 GB	Intel HD Graphics 615	256 GB SSD		12.1	1920 x 1080			1.2
Pro x2 612 G2	Intel i5-7Y54	4	1.2		4 GB	Intel HD Graphics 615	128 SSD		12.1	1920 x 1080			1.2

==== G3 ====
These are the ProBooks that have been released in Generation 3.

Model	CPU				RAM	Graphics	Storage	Audio	Screen		Battery	Operating system	Weight (kg)
Model	Model	Cores	GHz	Cache	RAM	Graphics	Storage	Audio	Size (in)	Resolution (pixels)	Battery	Operating system	Weight (kg)
ProBook x360 11 G3 EE	Intel Pentium N5000	4	1.1	4 MB	8 GB	Intel HD Graphics 605	128 GB SSD	Built-in speakers and microphone	11.6	1366 x 768		Windows 10	1.45
ProBook 430 G3	Intel Core i3-6200U	2	2.3	3 MB	4 GB	Intel HD Graphics 520	500 HDD	Built-in stereo speakers	13.3	1366 x 768			2
ProBook 440 G3	Intel Core i3-6200U	2	2.3		4 GB	Intel HD Graphics 520	500 HDD	HD audio with DTS Studio Sound	14	1920 x 1080			1.67
ProBook 446 G3									14				
ProBook 450 G3	Intel Core i5-6200U	2	2.3		4 GB	Intel HD Graphics 520	500 HDD		15.6	1920 x 1080			2.11
ProBook 455 G3	AMD A10 8700P	4	1.8		16 GB	AMD Radeon R5	1000 HDD		15.6	1366 x 768			2.15
ProBook 470 G3	Intel Core i7-6500U	2	2.5		8 GB	AMD Radeon R7 M340	1000 HDD		17.3	1920 x 1080			2.61
ProBook 640 G3	Intel Core i5-7200U	2	2.5		8 GB	Intel HD Graphics 620	500 HDD		14	1366 x 768			1.95
ProBook 645 G3	AMD A10-8730B	4	2.4		4 GB	AMD Radeon R5	500 HDD		14	1920 x 1080			1.95
ProBook 650 G3	Intel Core i5-7200U	2	2.5		4 GB	Intel HD Graphics 620	500 HDD		15.6	1920 x 1080			2.31
ProBook 655 G3	AMD A10-8730B	4	2.4		4 GB	AMD Radeon R5	500 HDD		15.6	1920 x 1080			2.4

==== G4 ====
These are the ProBooks that have been released in Generation 4.

Model	CPU				Graphics	RAM	Storage	Audio	Screen		Battery	Operating system	Weight (kg)
Model	Model	Cores	GHz	Cache	Graphics	RAM	Storage	Audio	Size (in)	Resolution (pixels)	Battery	Operating system	Weight (kg)
ProBook x360 11 G4 EE	Intel Core M3-8100Y	2	1.1		Intel UHD Graphics 615	8 GB	256 GB SSD		11.6	1366 x 768			1.44
ProBook 430 G4	Intel Core i7-7500U	2	2.7		Intel UHD Graphics 620	8 GB	256 GB SSD + 1000 HDD		13.3	1920 x 1080			1.58
ProBook 440 G4	Intel Core i7-7500U	2	2.5		Intel UHD Graphics 620	4 GB	1000 HDD		14	1366 x 768			1.64
ProBook 450 G4	Intel Core i7-7500U	2	2.5		Intel UHD Graphics 620	8 GB	1000 HDD		15.6	1920 x 1080			2.04
ProBook 455 G4	AMD A6-9210	2	2.4		AMD Radeon R5	8 GB	1000 HDD		15.6	1920 x 1080			2.08
ProBook 470 G4	Intel Core i7-7500U	2	2.7		NVIDIA GeForce 930MX	8 GB	256 GB SSD		17.3	1920 x 1080			2.77
ProBook 470 G4	Intel Core i7-7500U	2	2.7		Intel HD Graphics 620	8 GB	256 GB SSD		17.3	1920 x 1080			2.77
ProBook 640 G4	Intel Core i5-8250U	4	1.6		Intel HD Graphics 620	8 GB	256 GB SSD		14	1920 x 1080			1.73
ProBook 645 G4	AMD Ryzen 5 2500U	4	2		AMD Radeon RX Vega 8	8 GB	256 GB SSD		14	1920 x 1080			1.73
ProBook 645 G4 Pakistan (?)	AMD Ryzen 5 2500U	4	2		AMD Radeon RX Vega 8	8 GB	256 GB SSD		14	1920 x 1080			1.73
ProBook 650 G4	Intel Core i5-8250U	4	1.6		Intel HD Graphics 620	8 GB	256 GB SSD		15.6	1920 x 1080			2.2

==== G5 ====
These are the ProBooks that have been released in Generation 5.

Model	CPU				Graphics	RAM	Storage	Screen		Audio	Operating system	Weight (kg)
Model	Model	Cores	GHz	Cache	Graphics	RAM	Storage	Size (in)	Resolution (pixels)	Audio	Operating system	Weight (kg)
ProBook x360 11 G5 EE	Intel Pentium Silver N5030	4	1.1		Intel UHD Graphics 605	8 GB	256 GB SSD	11.6	1366 x 768			1.43
ProBook 430 G5	Intel Core i5-8250U	4	1.6		Intel UHD Graphics 620	8 GB	256 GB SSD	13.3	1920 x 1080			1.48
ProBook 440 G5	Intel Core i5-8250U	4	1.6		Intel UHD Graphics 620	8 GB	256 GB SSD	14	1366 x 768			2
ProBook 450 G5	Intel Core i5-8550U	4	1.8		NVIDIA GeForce 930MX	8 GB	256 GB SSD	15.6	1920 x 1080			2.1
ProBook 450 G5	Intel Core i5-8550U	4	1.8		Intel UHD Graphics 620	8 GB	256 GB SSD	15.6	1920 x 1080			2.1
ProBook 455 G5	A10-9620P	4	2.5		AMD Radeon R5	4 GB	500 HDD	15.6	1366 x 768			2.02
ProBook 470 G5	Intel Core i5-8250U	4	1.6		NVIDIA GeForce 930MX	8 GB	256 GB SSD	17.3	1920 x 1080			2.5
ProBook 640 G5	Intel Core i5-8265U	4	1.6		Intel UHD Graphics 620	8 GB	256 GB SSD	14	1920 x 1080			1.73
ProBook 650 G5	Intel Core i5-8265U	4	1.6		Intel UHD Graphics 620	8 GB	256 GB SSD	15.6	1920 x 1080			2.18

==== G6 ====
These are the ProBooks that have been released in Generation 6.

Model	CPU				Graphics	RAM	Storage	Screen		Audio	Operating system	Weight (kg)
Model	CPU				Graphics	RAM	Storage	Size (in)	Resolution (pixels)	Audio	Operating system	Weight (kg)
Model	Model	Cores	GHz	Cache	Graphics	RAM	Storage	Size (in)	Resolution (pixels)	Audio	Operating system	Weight (kg)
ProBook x360 11 G6 EE	Intel Core i5-10210Y	4	1		Intel UHD Graphics	8 GB	256 SSD	11.6	1366x768			1.44
ProBook 430 G6	Intel Core i5-8265U	4	1.6		Intel UHD Graphics 620	8 GB	256 SSD	13.3	1920x1080			1.44
ProBook 440 G6	Intel Core i5-8265U	4	1.6		Intel UHD Graphics 620	8 GB	1000 HDD	14	1366x768			1.6
ProBook 445 G6	AMD Ryzen 5 2500U	4	2		AMD Radeon RX Vega 8	8 GB	256 SSD	14	1920x1080			1.6
ProBook 445R G6	AMD Ryzen 5 3500U	4	2.1		AMD Radeon RX Vega 8	8 GB	256 SSD	14	1920x1080			1.6
ProBook 450 G6	Intel Core i7-8565U	4	1.8		NVIDIA GeForce MX130	8 GB	512 SSD	15.6	1920x1080			2
ProBook 450 G6	Intel Core i7-8565U	4	1.8		Intel UHD Graphics	8 GB	512 SSD	15.6	1920x1080			2
ProBook 455R G6	AMD Ryzen 5 3500U	4	2.1		AMD Radeon RX Vega 8	8 GB	256 SSD	15.6	1920x1080			2

==== G7 ====
These are the ProBooks that have been released in Generation 7 (2020).

Model	CPU	Graphics		RAM	Storage	Screen		Audio	Operating system	Weight (kg)
Model	CPU	Integrated	Discrete	RAM	Storage	Size (in)	Resolution (pixels)	Audio	Operating system	Weight (kg)
ProBook x360 435 G7 13.3-inch 2-in-1						13.3				
ProBook 430 G7						13.3				
ProBook 440 G7						14				
ProBook 445 G7						14				
ProBook 450 G7	Intel i#-10###U	Intel UHD Graphics 620		32		15.6				
ProBook 455 G7	AMD Ryzen (Zen 2)	AMD Radeon RX Vega		32		15.6	1920 x 1080			2
ProBook 470 G7	Intel i#-10###U	Intel UHD Graphics 620		16		17.3				

==== G8 ====
These are the ProBooks that have been released in Generation 8.

Model	CPU	Graphics		RAM	Storage	Screen		Audio	Operating system	Weight (kg)
Model	CPU	Integrated	Discrete	RAM	Storage	Size (in)	Resolution (pixels)	Audio	Operating system	Weight (kg)
ProBook x360 435 G8										
ProBook 430 G8										
ProBook 440 G8	Intel Core i7-1165G7 (up to 4.7 GHz with Intel Turbo Boost Technology, 12 MB L3 cache, 4 cores, 8 threads)	Intel Iris X^{e} Graphics		8		14	1920x1080			1.38
ProBook 445 G8	AMD Ryzen 7 5800U (up to 4.4 GHz max boost clock, 16 MB L3 cache, 8 cores, 16 threads)	RX Vega 8		8		14	1366x768			1.37
ProBook 450 G8	Intel Core i#-11##G#	Intel UHD/X^{e}		8/64	128 to 512	15.6	1920x1080		Windows 10 Pro	1.74
ProBook 630 G8	Intel Core i#-10###U									
ProBook 635 Aero G8	AMD Ryzen 5 5600U (up to 4.2 GHz max boost clock, 16 MB L3 cache, 6 cores, 12 threads)	RX Vega		8		13.3	1920x1080			
ProBook 640 G8										
ProBook 650 G8	Intel Core i#-11##G#	Intel UHD/X^{e}	NVIDIA GeForce MX450	8/64	256/512	15.6	1920x1080		Windows 10 Pro	1.74

==== G9 ====
These are the ProBooks that have been released in Generation 9.

Model	CPU				RAM	Graphics	Storage	Screen		Audio	Operating system	Weight
Model	CPU				RAM	Graphics	Storage	Size (in)	Resolution	Audio	Operating system	Weight
Model	Model	Cores	GHz	Cache	RAM	Graphics	Storage	Size (in)	Resolution	Audio	Operating system	Weight
HP ProBook 440 G9	Intel Core i7-1255U	10	3.5		16 GB	Intel Iris X^{e} Graphics	512 GB SSD	14	1920 x 1080			1.36
ProBook 450 G9	Intel Core i5-1235U	10	3.3		8 GB	Intel Iris X^{e} Graphics	512 GB SSD	15.6	1920 x 1080			1.74
ProBook 455 G9	AMD Ryzen 7 5825U	8	2		16 GB	AMD Radeon Graphics	512 GB SSD	15.6	1920 x 1080			1.74
ProBook 650 G9	Intel Core i3/i5/i7 12th gen				8+ GB	Intel Iris X^{e} Graphics	128 to 256 GB SSD	15.6	1920 x 1080		Windows 11 Pro	~1.74
ProBook x360 435 G9	AMD Ryzen 5 5625U	6	2.3		8 GB		256 GB SSD	13.3	1920 x 1080			1.45

==== G10 ====
Model	CPU	Graphics		RAM (max)	Storage	Screen		Audio	Battery	Operating system	Weight (kg)
Model	CPU	Integrated	Discrete	RAM (max)	Storage	Size (in)	Resolution (pixels)	Audio	Battery	Operating system	Weight (kg)
Pro x360 435 G10	AMD Ryzen	AMD Radeon				13.3		Integrated microphone (Dual Array)		Windows 11	1.45
ProBook 440 G10											
ProBook 445 G10											
ProBook 450 G10	13th Gen Intel Core	Intel Iris Xe/UHD	NVIDIA GeForce RTX 2050	32	128 to 512 GB SSD	15.6	1920 x 1080			Windows 11	1.79
ProBook 455 G10	AMD Ryzen #-7#30U	AMD Radeon	N/A	32	256	15.6	1920 x 1080			Windows 11 pro	1.77
ProBook 470 G10	13th Gen Intel Core	Intel Iris Xe	NVIDIA GeForce MX550	32	512	17.3	1920 x 1080			Windows 11 pro	2.08

== Timeline of releases ==
Hewlett-Packard ProBook release timeline
Screen size	Series	2009	2010	2011	2012	2013		2014	2015	2016	2017	2018	2019	2020	2021
11.6"									11 EE^{G1}
12.1"	s-series			4230s
12.1"	m-series		5220m
13.3"	s-series, g-series	4310s/ 4311s	4320s/ 4321s 4325s/ 4326s	4330s/ 4331s	4340s/ 4341s	430^{G1}		430^{G2}	430^{G3}	430^{G4}	430^{G5}	430^{G6}	430^{G7}
13.3"	m-series	5310m	5320m	5330m
13.3"	b-series			6360b
14"	s-series, g-series	4410s/ 4411s 4415s/ 4416s	4420s/ 4421s 4425s	4430s/ 4431s 4435s/ 4436s	4440s/ 4441s 4445s/ 4446s	440^{G0}	440^{G1} 445^{G1}	440^{G2} 445^{G2}	440^{G3}	440^{G4}	440^{G5}	440^{G6}	440^{G7}	440^{G8}	440^{G9}
14"	b-series	6440b 6445b	6450b 6455b	6460b 6465b	6470b 6475b
14"	g-series					640^{G1} 645^{G1}				640^{G2} 645^{G2}
15.6"	s-series, g-series	4510s 4515s	4520s 4525s	4530s 4535s	4540s 4545s	450^{G0}	450^{G1} 455^{G1}	450^{G2} 455^{G2}	450^{G3} 455^{G3}	450^{G4} 455^{G4}	450^{G5}	450^{G6}	450^{G7} 455^{G7}	450^{G8} 455^{G8}
15.6"	b-series	6540b 6545b	6550b 6555b	6560b 6565b	6570b
15.6"	g-series					650^{G1} 655^{G1}				650^{G2} 655^{G2}	650^{G3} 655^{G3}	650^{G4}	650^{G5}	650^{G8}
17.3"	s-series	4710s	4720s	4730s	4740s	470^{G0}	470^{G1}	470^{G2}	470^{G3}	470^{G4}	470^{G5}	470^{G6}	470^{G7}	470^{G8}

== See also ==
Competing laptop lines include:

- Acer TravelMate and Extensa
- ASUS ExpertBook
- Dell Latitude and Vostro
- Fujitsu Lifebook
- Lenovo ThinkPad and ThinkBook
- Toshiba Portégé and Tecra
