= Acer Extensa =

Line of Acer laptops

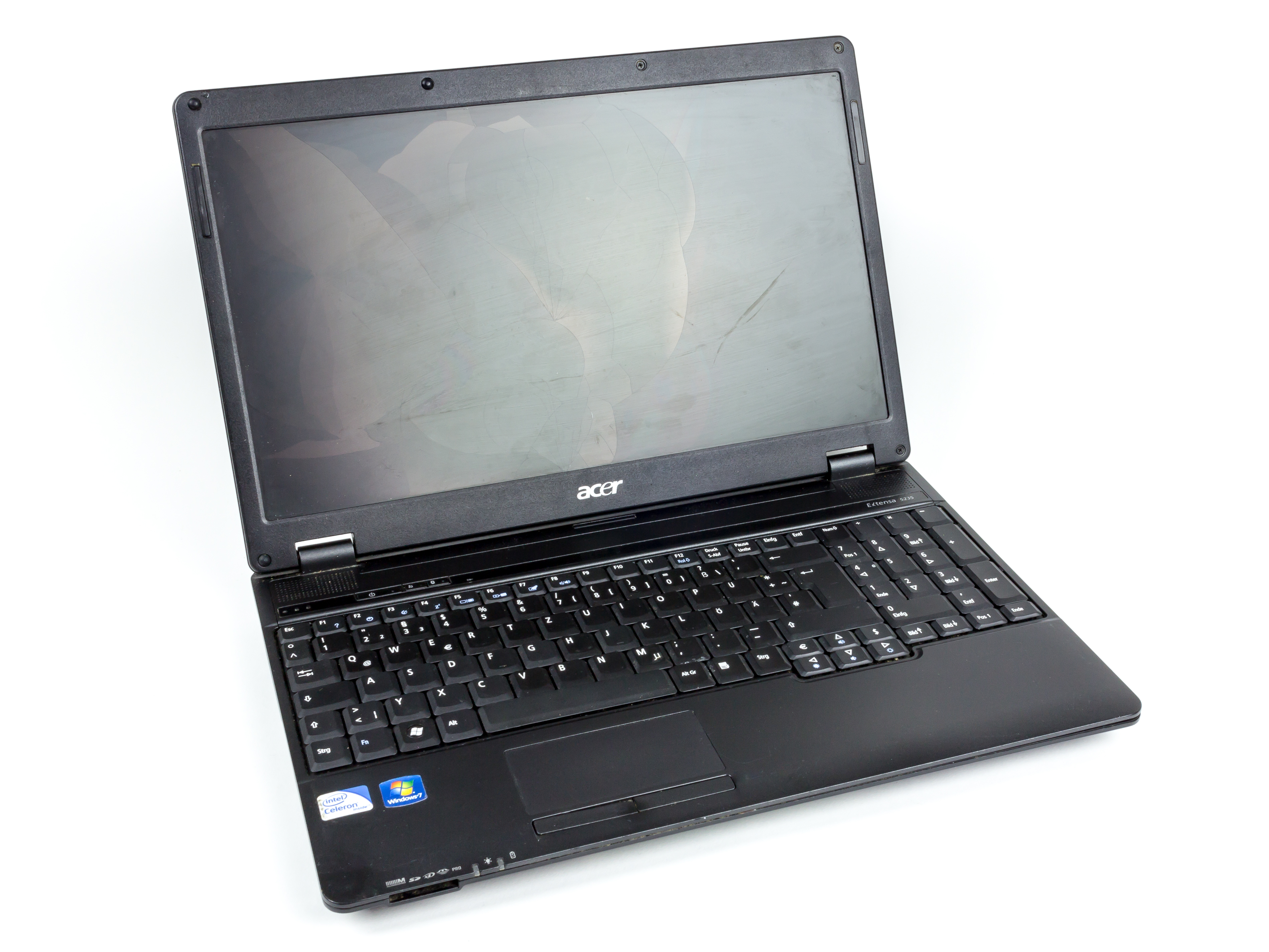
- Acer Extensa 5235
- Developer: Acer Inc.
- Type: Laptop
- Released: 1997 (as Acer Extensa); 1995 (as TI Extensa)
- Operating system: Windows
- CPU: AMD, Intel
- Graphics: AMD, Nvidia
- Marketing target: Business
- Related: Acer TravelMate, Acer Veriton

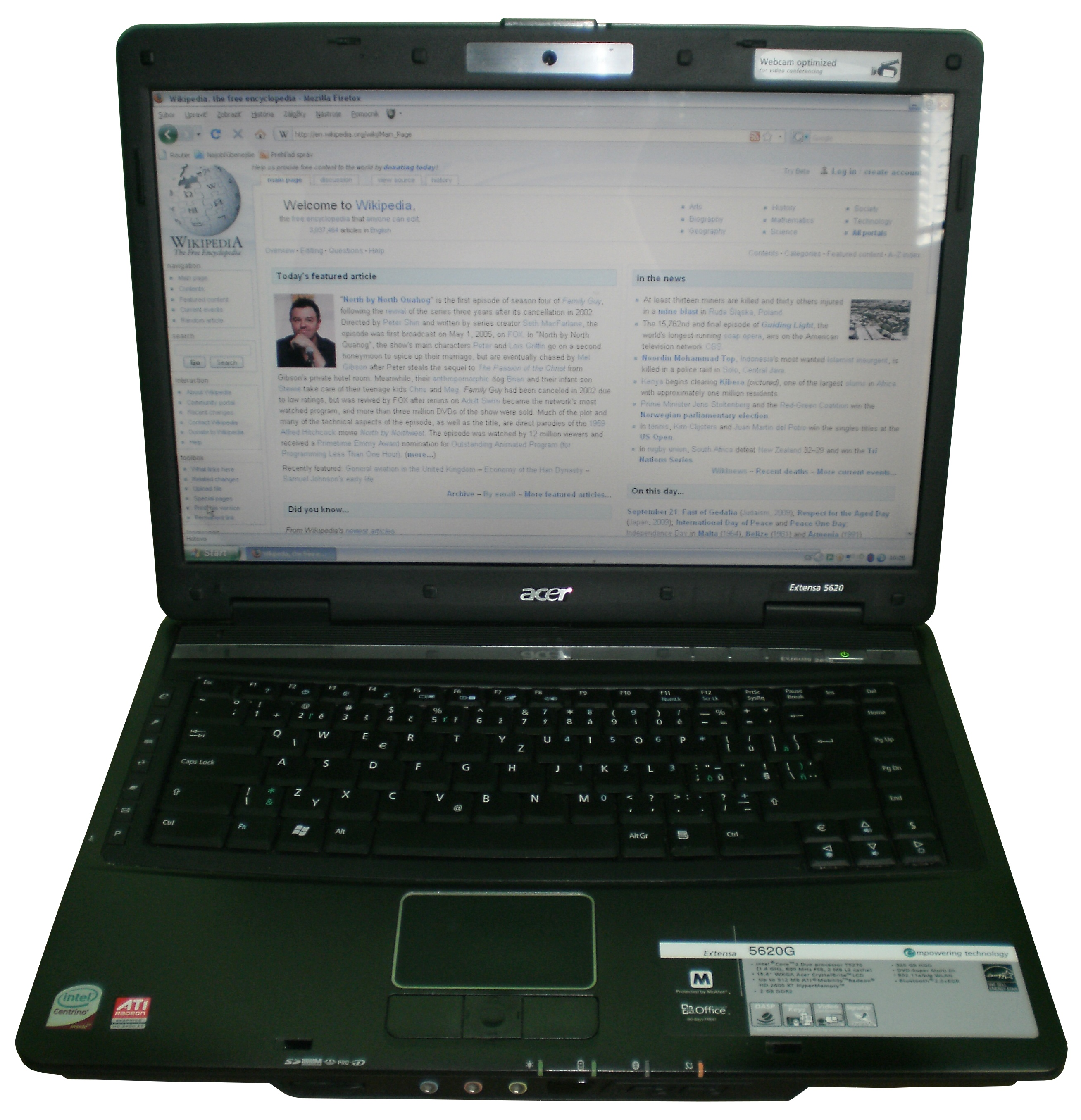
Acer Extensa 5620G displaying the Main Page of the English Wikipedia

Acer Extensa series is an affordable line of Acer laptops designed for office and business users. Its competitors include the Dell Vostro, HP ProBook and Toshiba Tecra lines and low-end Lenovo ThinkPad laptops. The Extensa series includes several notebooks with different design, performance, and functionality. The Extensa name had been used by Texas Instruments, which sold its mobile computing division to Acer in 1997.

== Models ==
=== Current models ===
Acer Extensa 15 – 15.6" model line with plastic case; 2020 model – Intel Core i3/i5 U series, 1920×1080 TN screen, button.

Model			CPU			RAM	Storage	Audio	Screen Size (in)
		Product Code	Model	Cores	GHz	RAM	Storage	Audio	Screen Size (in)
Extensa 15	EX215-55	NX.EGYEG.005	Intel i5-1235U	10	1.3	8 GB	256 GB SSD		15.6
Extensa 15	EX215-54	NX.EGJEK.009	i3-1115G4	2	1.7	8 GB	256 GB SSD		15.6
Extensa 15	EX215-53	NX.EGCEY.002	i5-1035G1	4	1	8 GB	256 GB SSD		15.6
Extensa 15	EX215-52	NX.EG8EK.005	i5-1035G1	4	1	8 GB	256 GB SSD		15.6
Extensa 15	EX215-32	NX.EGNEP.005	Intel Celeron N5100	4	1.1	4 GB	256 GB SSD		15.6
Extensa 15	EX215-22	NX.EGJET.004	i7-1165G7	4	1.2	8 GB	256 GB SSD		15.6
Extensa 14	EX214-53	NX.EGJEK.009	i7-1165G7	4	2.4	16 GB	256 GB SSD		15.6
Extensa 14	EX214-52	NX.EGFCN.004	i7-1165G7	4	2.4	16 GB	512 GB SSD		14

=== Discontinued models ===
==== Acer ====
- Extensa 2540
- Extensa 4130
- Extensa 4220
- Extensa 4230
- Extensa 4420
- Extensa 4430
- Extensa 4620
- Extensa 4630
- Extensa 5120
- Extensa 5220
- Extensa 5230
- Extensa 5235
- Extensa 5420
- Extensa 5430
- Extensa 5620
- Extensa 5630
- Extensa 7230
- Extensa 7620
- Extensa 7630

Model		CPU			RAM	Graphics	Storage	Audio	Screen		Weight (kg)	Operating system
Model		Model	Cores	GHz	RAM	Graphics	Storage	Audio	Size (in)	Resolution (pixels)	Weight (kg)	Operating system
Extensa 2540	33N4	Intel Core i3 6006U	2	2	4 GB	Intel HD Graphics 620	500 HDD		15.6	1366 x 768	2.4	
Extensa 2540	54R	Intel Core i5-7200U	2	2.5	4 GB	Intel HD Graphics 620	256 SSD		15.6	1366 x 768	2.4	
Extensa 2540	5325	Intel Core i5-7200U	2	2.5	4 GB	Intel HD Graphics 620	1000 HDD		15.6	1920 x 1080	2.4	
Extensa 2540	580K	Intel Core i5-7200U	2	2.5	8 GB	Intel HD Graphics 620	256 SSD		15.6	1920 x 1080	2.4	
Extensa 2540	312E	Intel Core i3-6006U	2	2	4 GB	Intel HD Graphics 620	500 HDD		15.6	1366 x 768	2.4	
Extensa 2540	53W6	Intel Core i5-7200U	2	2.5	8 GB	Intel HD Graphics 620	1000 HDD		15.6	1366 x 768	2.4	
Extensa 4120		AMD Sempron 3400+	1	1.8	2 GB	ATI Radeon Xpress X1250	80/120/160 GB HDD	Built-in Acer 3DSonic stereo speakers with HD audio and compatible with MS Sound	14.1	1280 x 800	2.4	
Extensa 4120		AMD Sempron 3500+	1	1.8	2 GB	ATI Radeon Xpress X1250	80/120/160 GB HDD	Built-in Acer 3DSonic stereo speakers with HD audio and compatible with MS Sound	14.1	1280 x 800	2.4	
Extensa 4120		AMD Sempron 3600+	1	2	2 GB	ATI Radeon Xpress X1250	80/120/160 GB HDD	Built-in Acer 3DSonic stereo speakers with HD audio and compatible with MS Sound	14.1	1280 x 800	2.4	
Extensa 4130		AMD Sempron SI-40	1	2	2 GB	ATI Radeon HD 3200	120 GB HDD	Built-in Acer 3DSonic stereo speakers with HD audio and compatible with MS Sound	14.1	1280 x 800	2.88	
Extensa 4130		AMD Mobile Sempron SI-42	1	2.1	2 GB	ATI Radeon HD 3200	120 GB HDD	Built-in Acer 3DSonic stereo speakers with HD audio and compatible with MS Sound	14.1	1280 x 800	2.88	
Extensa 4220		Intel Celeron M 530	1	1.73	2 GB	Intel Graphics Media Accelerator X3100	80 GB HDD	Built-in Acer 3DSonic stereo speakers with Intel HD audio and compatible with MS Sound	14.1	1280 x 800	2.4	Windows XP Professional with SP2; Windows Vista
Extensa 4220		Intel Celeron M 540	1	1.86	2 GB	Intel Graphics Media Accelerator X3100	80 GB HDD	Built-in Acer 3DSonic stereo speakers with Intel HD audio and compatible with MS Sound	14.1	1280 x 800	2.4	Windows XP Professional with SP2; Windows Vista
Extensa 4220		Intel Celeron M 550 or higher	1	2	2 GB	Intel Graphics Media Accelerator X3100	80 GB HDD	Built-in Acer 3DSonic stereo speakers with Intel HD audio and compatible with MS Sound	14.1	1280 x 800	2.4	Windows XP Professional with SP2; Windows Vista
Extensa 4230		Intel Celeron M 575	1	2	2 GB	Intel Graphics Media Accelerator 4500M	160 HDD		14.1	1280 x 800	2.35	
Extensa 4420		AMD Athlon 64 X2 TK-57	2	1.9	2 GB	ATI Radeon X1250	Up to 160 GB HDD	Built-in Acer 3DSonic stereo speakers with HD audio and compatible with MS Sound	14.1	1280 x 800	2.4	
Extensa 4430												
Extensa 4620		Intel Core 2 Duo T5450	2	1.7	1 GB	Intel Graphics Media Accelerator X3100	120 HDD		14.1	1280 x 800	2.4	
Extensa 4620Z		Intel Pentium T2310	2	1.46	2 GB	Intel Graphics Media Accelerator X3100	160 HDD		14.1	1280 x 800	2.4	
Extensa 4620Z		Intel Pentium T2330	2	1.6	2 GB	Intel Graphics Media Accelerator X3100	160 HDD		14.1	1280 x 800	2.4	
Extensa 4630		Intel Pentium T3200	2	2	2 GB	Intel Graphics Media Accelerator 4500MHD	120 HDD		14.1	1280 x 800	2.345 (with 6 cell battery)	
Extensa 4630		Intel Pentium T3200	2	2	2 GB	Intel Graphics Media Accelerator 4500MHD	120 HDD		14.1	1280 x 800	2.5 (with 9 cell battery)	
Extensa 4630G		Intel Core 2 Duo P7350	2	2	2 GB	NVIDIA GeForce 9300M GS	250 HDD		14.1	1280 x 800	2.345 (with 6 cell battery)	
Extensa 4630G		Intel Core 2 Duo P7350	2	2	2 GB	NVIDIA GeForce 9300M GS	250 HDD		14.1	1280 x 800	2.5 (with 9 cell battery)	
Extensa 4630Z		Intel Pentium T3200	2	2	2 GB	Intel Graphics Media Accelerator 4500MHD	120 HDD		14.1	1280 x 800	2.345 (with 6 cell battery)	
Extensa 4630Z		Intel Pentium T3400	2	2.16	2 GB	Intel Graphics Media Accelerator 4500MHD	120 HDD		14.1	1280 x 800	2.5 (with 9 cell battery)	
Extensa 4630ZG		Intel Pentium T3200	2	2	2 GB	NVIDIA GeForce 9300M GS	160 HDD		14.1	1280 x 800	2.345 (with 6 cell battery)	
Extensa 4630ZG		Intel Pentium T3400	2	2.16	2 GB	NVIDIA GeForce 9300M GS	160 HDD		14.1	1280 x 800	2.5 (with 9 cell battery)	

==== Texas Instruments ====
Extensa 45x series (1995)

Extensa 57x series (1996)

Features	Model 570CD	Model 575CD	Model 570CDT	Model 575CDT
11.3" Dual Scan, SVGA Color LCD	x	x		
10.4" Active Matrix (TFT), SVGA Color LCD			x	x
1.44 MB Floppy Drive Module	x	x	x	x
CD-ROM Drive Module	x	x	x	x
Windows 95	x	x	x	x
Application Software		x		x
16-Bit Stereo Sound	x	x	x	x
HDD 810 Million Bytes	x	x		
HDD 1200 Million Bytes			x	x

Extensa 60x & 65x series (1996)

== See also ==
- Acer Aspire and TravelMate
- ASUS VivoBook and ExpertBook
- Dell Vostro and Latitude
- Fujitsu Lifebook
- HP ProBook and EliteBook
- Lenovo ThinkBook and ThinkPad
- Toshiba Tecra and Portégé
