= C111 =

C111 may refer to

- Acer TravelMate C111, an Acer TravelMate model
- Discrimination (Employment and Occupation) Convention, 1958
- Mercedes-Benz C111
