= ThinkBook =

Line of laptop computers and tablets

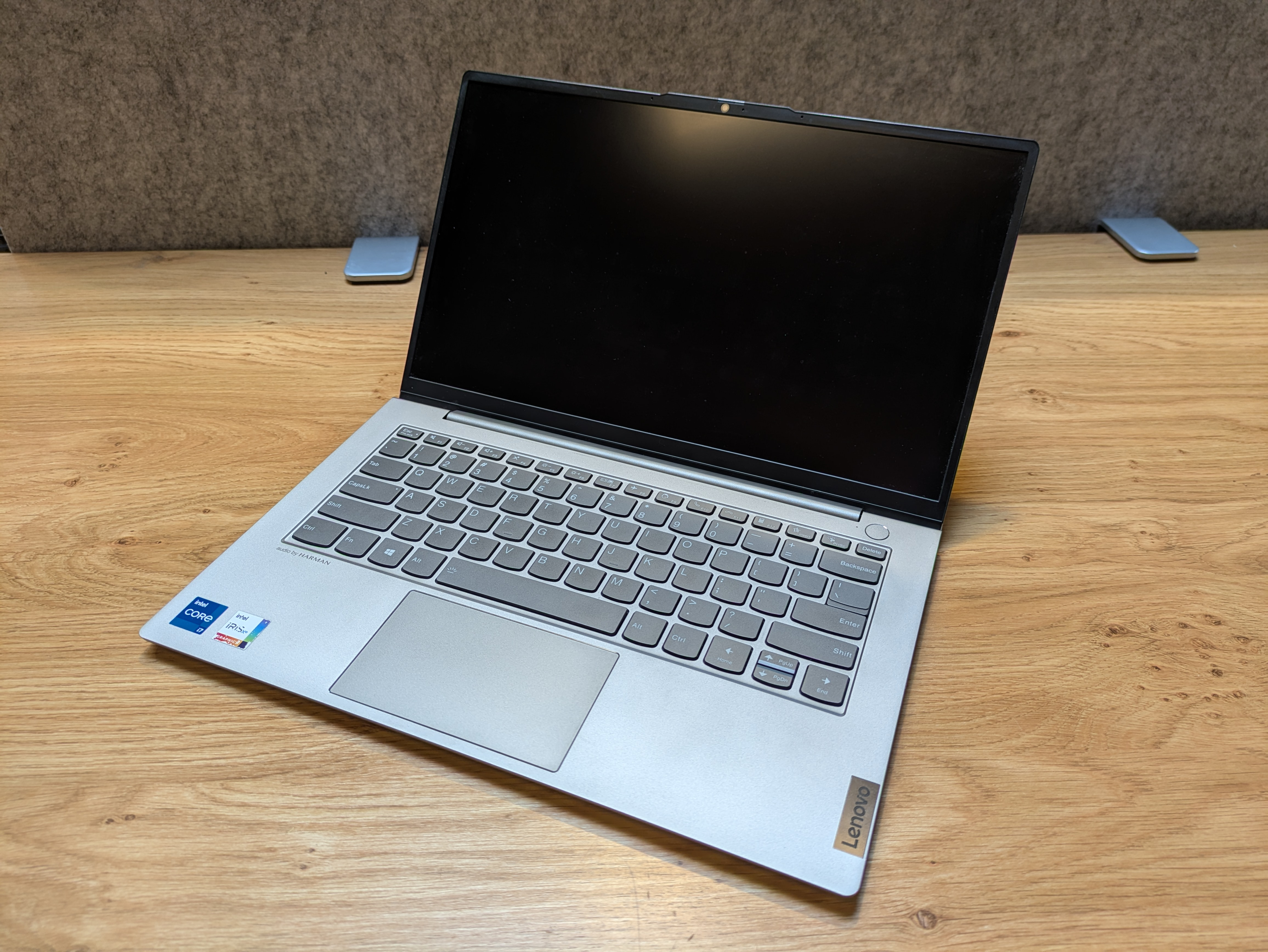
- ThinkBook 14s
- Developer: Lenovo
- Type: Laptop, Netbook
- Released: May 2019
- Operating system: Windows
- CPU: Intel, AMD
- Graphics: Intel, AMD, Nvidia
- Platform: Think
- Marketing target: Business
- Related: ThinkPad E series
- Website: ThinkBook laptops | Modern devices built for your SMB | Lenovo US

ThinkBook is a line of business-oriented laptop computers and tablets designed, developed and marketed by Lenovo aimed at small businesses.

The ThinkBook line is marketed towards small business users and gets the same market position as Lenovo's ThinkPad E series. The ThinkBook does not have a TrackPoint, physical touchpad buttons, and has a simplified keyboard layout. However, the ThinkBook has an aluminum case (instead of a plastic Thinkpad E case).

== 13s and 14s ==
The first product lineup launched in 2019 with the ThinkBook 13s and 14s. Both laptops include TPM 2.0 security chips, fingerprint readers, webcam shutters similar to those on ThinkPads, and dedicated buttons for Skype. They support 8th Generation Intel Core processors, AMD Radeon 540X graphics, M.2 SSD storage, USB-C Docks, and run Windows 10 Pro. The ThinkBook 13s has a 13-inch screen and the 14s has a 14-inch screen.

== See also ==
- Lenovo IdeaPad
- IBM/Lenovo ThinkCentre
- IBM/Lenovo ThinkPad
- Toshiba Tecra
- HP ProBook
- Dell Vostro
- Acer Extensa
