= Acer TravelMate =

Series of business-oriented laptops by Acer

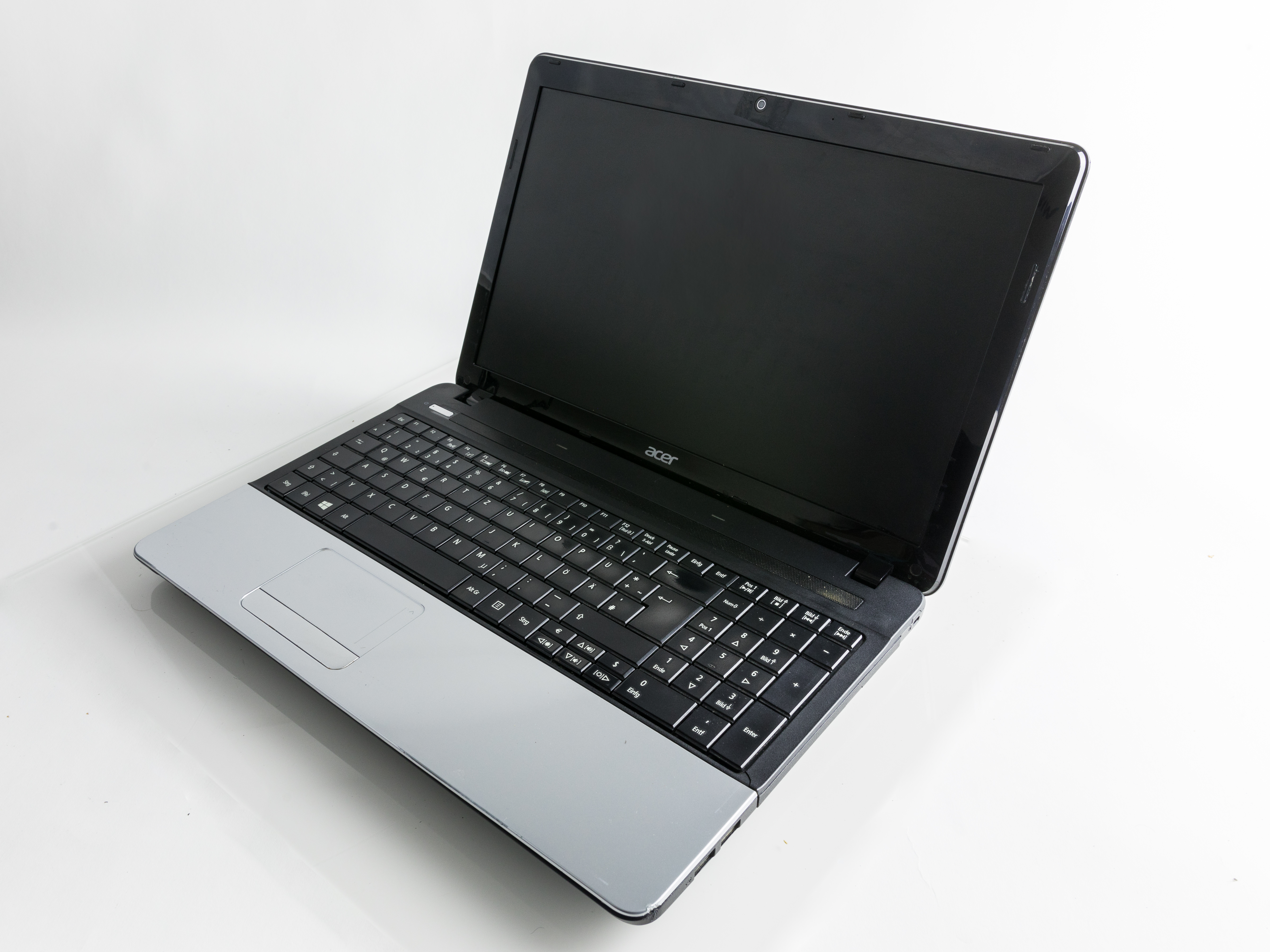
- 2012's Acer TravelMate P253-M
- Developer: Acer
- Type: Laptop, Netbook
- Released: 1997 (as Acer TravelMate); 1990 (as TI TravelMate)
- Operating system: Windows, Linux
- CPU: AMD, Intel
- Graphics: AMD, Nvidia
- Marketing target: Business
- Related: Acer Extensa, Acer Veriton
- Website: TravelMate

TravelMate is a line of business-oriented laptop computers manufactured by Acer. In recent years, the lineup has expanded to include AI- powered Copilot+ PCs featuring Intel Core Ultra and AMD Ryzen AI processors, such as the TravelMate P6 14 AI.Of the various notebook series Acer has offered, the TravelMate is designated as a lightweight business and professional computer built to withstand day-to-day activities. TravelMate laptops are well received by reviewers, often, however, they are faulted for a lack of visual appeal. The TravelMate name was previously used by Texas Instruments, which sold its mobile computing division to Acer in 1997. The TravelMate mainly competes against business computers such as Asus's ExpertBook, Dell's Latitude, HP's EliteBook, Lenovo's ThinkPad, and Toshiba's Portégé.

== Overview ==
=== Hardware ===
Depending on the model, the TravelMate series' standard features may include a full specter of actual ports, include an Ethernet adapter, and one or more PC Card slots. They may also include a docking port, an optical drive, and one VGA port. The version with soldered memory is uncommon. The higher-end models come with professional graphics cards. The TPM chip is also a common option.

As with other laptops, earlier models used CFL backlit LCD screens, later transitioning to LED backlit screens. The classic models may have a pointing stick option, a docking port, fingerprint reader, and other high-end business features. The curved keyboard layout was only a TravelMate family feature.

=== Software ===
The operating system included with the TravelMate has, at various times, been Windows 2000, Windows XP, Windows Vista, Windows 7, Windows 8, Windows 8.1 and Windows 10. Several proprietary utilities from Acer are usually provided, which interface with the operating system. These programs include Acer ePower Management for changing the computer's mobile power options, Acer eRecovery Management for flexible data backup, and Acer Launch Manager for configuring the computer's launch keys, which launch user-defined applications. Others utilities manage passwords, file encryption, memory optimization, and network connections. Many models organize these together into an interface called 'Empowering Technology'—with the aim of allowing safer, more comfortable, and practical use of the notebook.

== History ==
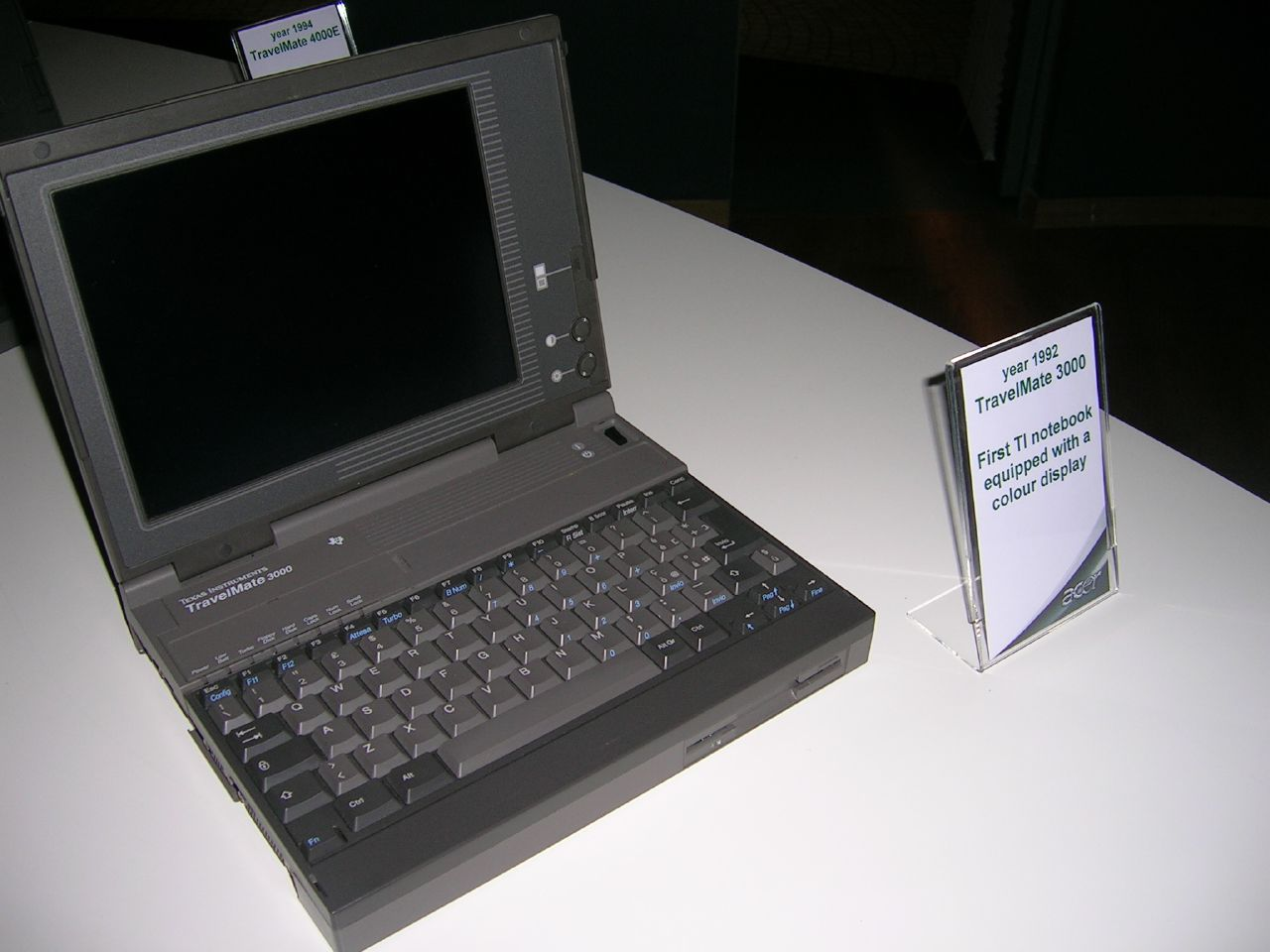
Texas Instruments TravelMate 3000

=== Texas Instruments TravelMate models ===
TravelMate 3000 (1991)

TravelMate 4000m (1995)

== Acer models ==
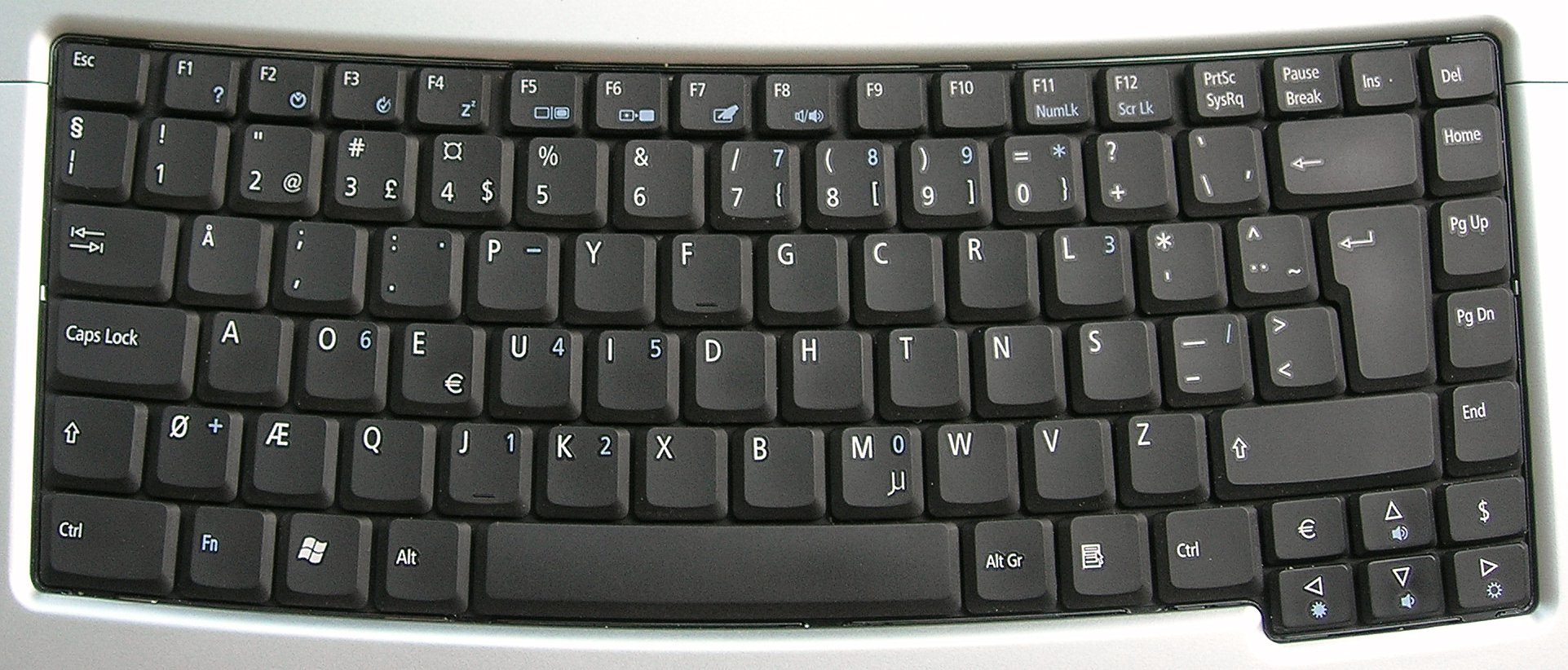
Acer TravelMate classic keyboard design

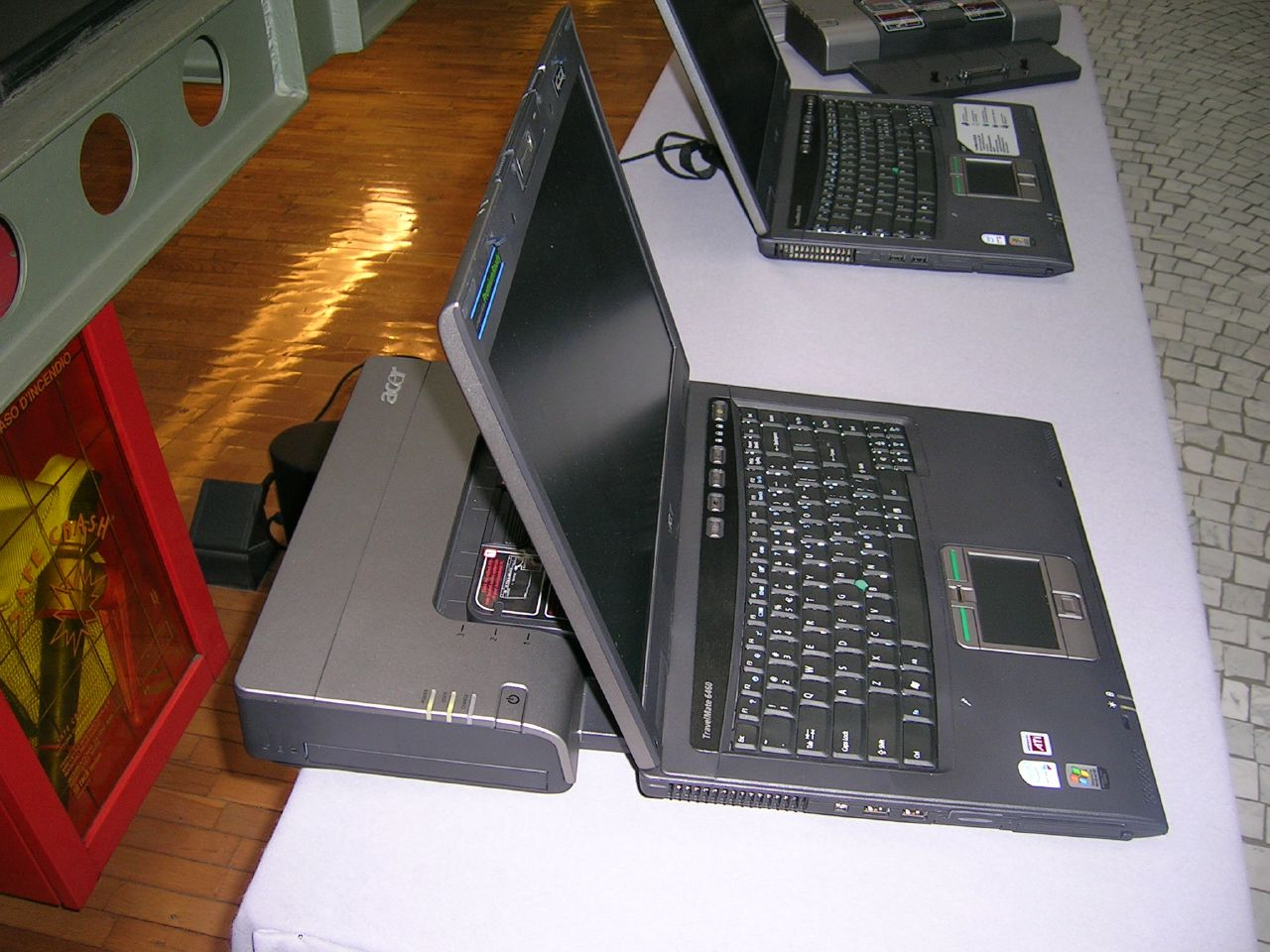
TravelMate 6450 with a docking station

=== TravelMate series ===
Model	Processor		Chipset	Memory	Graphics	Storage		Removable	Screen		Audio	Operating System
Model	Type	Speed	Chipset	Memory	Graphics	Size	Type	Removable	Type	Resolution	Audio	Operating System
Travelmate 730	Intel Pentium III	850 MHz	Intel 815EM	128 MB DDR1		20 GB	IDE HDD	3.5-inch (1.44 MB)	15" CCFL anti-glare	1024×768		
Travelmate 220	Intel Celeron	1133 MHz	Intel 830M	256 MB DDR1		40 GB	IDE HDD	3.5-inch (1.44 MB)	14.1" CCFL anti-glare	1024×768		
Travelmate 280	Intel Pentium 4	2.00 GHz	Intel 845GL	256 MB DDR1		30 GB	IDE HDD	CD-RW DVD-ROM	14.1" CCFL anti-glare	1024x768		
Travelmate 2220	Intel Celeron or Celeron D	2.60 GHz		256 MB DDR1	ATI Radeon 9000	40 GB	IDE HDD	CD-RW DVD-ROM	15" CCFL anti-glare	1024×768		
Travelmate 4220	Intel Core Duo T2300	1.67 GHz	Intel 945GM	512 MB DDR2		60 GB	IDE HDD	CD-RW DVD-ROM	15.4" CCFL anti-glare	1280×800		
Travelmate 6291	Intel Core 2 Duo T5500	1.66 GHz	Intel 945GM	2 GB DDR2	Intel GMA 950			DVDRW	12.1" CCFL	1280×800		
Travelmate 8172T	Intel Core I3-330UM	1.33 GHz		4 GB DDR3	Intel HD Graphics	320 GB	SATA HDD	DVDRW	11.6" CCFL or LED	1366×768		

==== TravelMate 2420 ====
The TravelMate 2420 was a Centrino based laptop computer, featuring either a Celeron M or a Pentium M processor at 1.7 GHz, depending on the region where it was to be distributed. As of April 2007, this model was discontinued by Acer Corp in the USA and Mexico.

In Latin America it included one 256 MB DDR2 SO-DIMM, though in other countries it included one single SO-DIMM module of 512 MB. The Latin American version also included a 40 GB, 4200 RPM hard disk. In other countries, the hard disk was 80 GB.

As it was based on the Centrino platform, it included a 10/100 Mbit/s Ethernet adapter, a wireless Ethernet adapter, a Bluetooth adapter and one PC Card slot. It also included three USB 2.0 ports, one VGA port, and a CD-RW/DVD-ROM as optical media drive.

TravelMate 5760

The TravelMate 5760 was manufactured in 2011, gaining popularity in 2012. It featured the Intel Core i3-2310M dual-core processor at 2.10 GHz. The device came with a hard drive of 250 GB, 320 GB, 500 GB, 640 GB or 750 GB and 4 GB 1066 MHz of DDR3 SDRAM. It was able to support up to 8 GB of RAM. It came with the Windows 7 Professional operating system and also featured an HDMI port, three USB 2.0 ports, one VGA port, and one RJ-45 Ethernet port.

==== TravelMate 6292 ====
The TravelMate 6292 was manufactured from 2007 to 2009. It features an Intel Centrino duo chip set consisting of 802.11a/g/draft-n, Bluetooth 2.0+edr and an Intel Core 2 Duo processor at 2.0 or 2.2 GHz. The unit came with 2 GB of 667 MHz DDR2 SO-DIMM RAM, a 160 GB HDD, and Intel GMA X3100 graphics accelerator. The laptop has been praised for its ruggedness, but faulted for its poor visual appeal. This laptop has been a popular choice for making a "Hackintosh" computer, as it had nearly identical hardware to the 2006 clamshell polycarbonate MacBook.

==== TravelMate P6 ====
Released in 2020, the model has a 14-inch screen and was equipped with 8 ports: 2 USB, 1 USB-C port, HDMI, charging port, 3.5 audio jack, SD reader and Ethernet. This model was described as a solid business machine, but keyboard typing was less comfortable than typing on a ThinkPad X1 keyboard.

=== TravelMate TimeLineX series ===
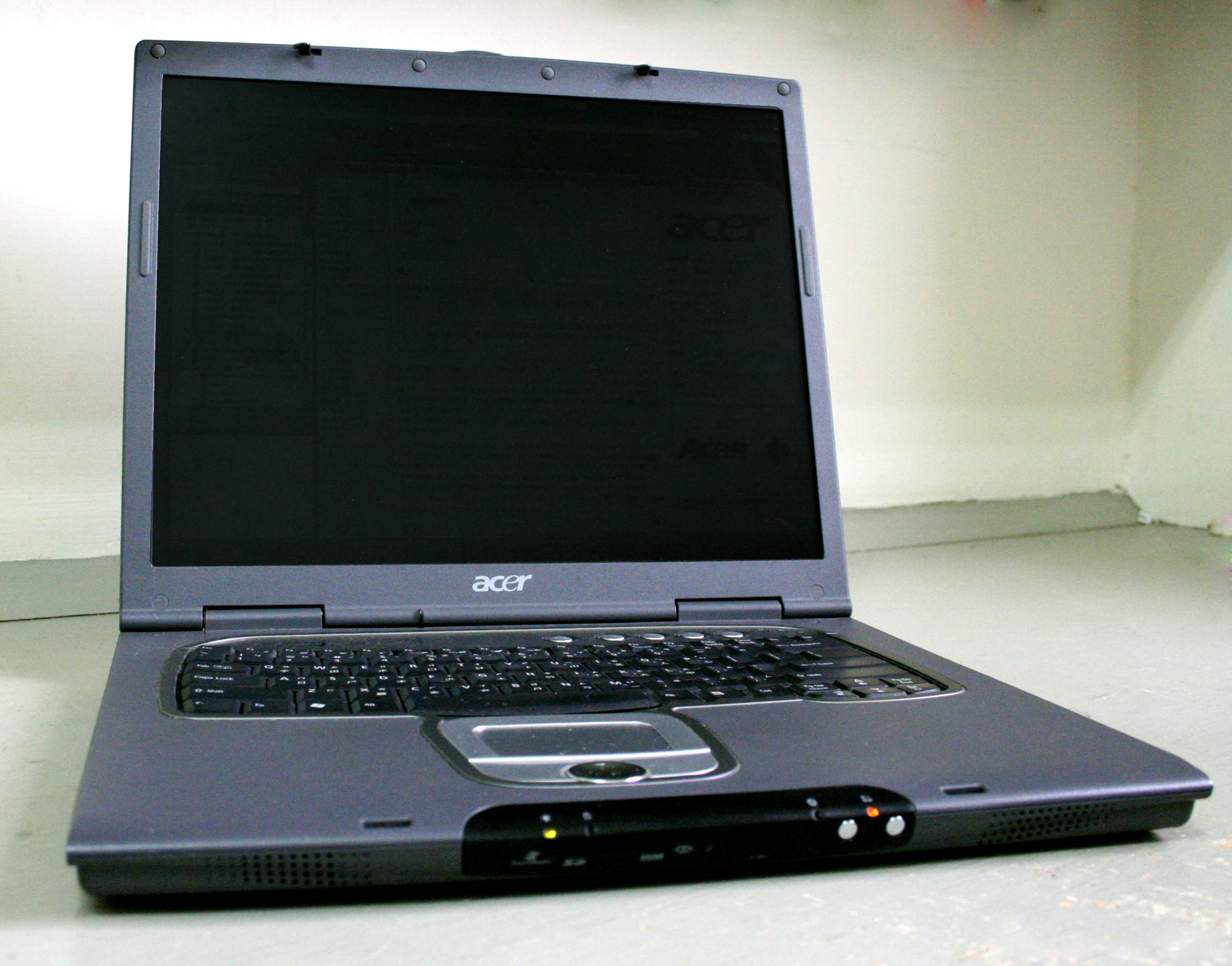
2004's TravelMate 8004

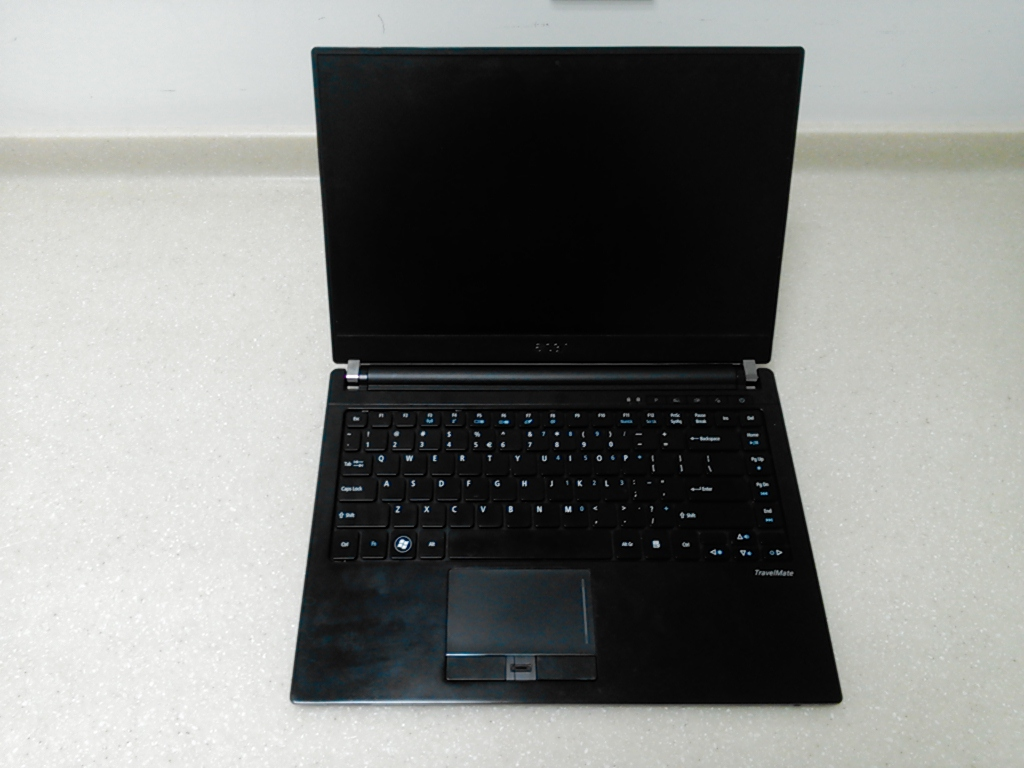
2011's TravelMate 8481TG

The TimeLineX are ranges of laptops focused on ultra-long battery life, on the order of 8 hours. In addition to the TravelMate, 'Timeline' has also been available with Acer Aspire.

- Acer TravelMate 8172
- Acer TravelMate 8371
- Acer TravelMate 8331
- Acer TravelMate 8372
- Acer TravelMate 8471
- Acer TravelMate 8431
- Acer TravelMate 8472
- Acer TravelMate 8473
- Acer TravelMate 8481
- Acer TravelMate 8552
- Acer TravelMate 8571
- Acer TravelMate 8531
- Acer TravelMate 8572

=== TravelMate Spin B1 ===
Acer TravelMate Spin B1
- Also known as: TravelMate Spin B1
- Developer: Acer
- Manufacturer: Acer
- Type: 2-in-1 PC
- Released: 2017
- Operating system: Windows 10
- CPU: Intel Celeron; Intel Pentium
- Memory: 4GB
- Storage: 256 GB/500 GB
- Display: 29.5 cm (11.6")
- Graphics: NVIDIA® GeForce® MX130 with 2 GB dedicated memory Intel® UHD Graphics 605 shared memory
- Sound: Two speakers
- Input: Headphone jack RJ-45 Ethernet port HDMI port 1 USB 3.0 port 1 USB 2.0 port SD/SDXC card
- Camera: Yes
- Touchpad: Yes
- Power: 3-cell
- Weight: 1.49 kg

=== TravelMate Spin B3 ===
Acer TravelMate Spin B3
- Also known as: TravelMate Spin B3
- Developer: Acer
- Manufacturer: Acer
- Type: 2-in-1 PC
- Released: 2021
- Operating system: Windows 10
- CPU: Intel Celeron; Intel Pentium
- Memory: 4GB
- Storage: 64 GB/128 GB
- Display: 29.5 cm (11.6")
- Graphics: Intel UHD Graphics 600/605 shared memory
- Sound: Two speakers
- Input: Headphone jack RJ-45 Ethernet port DisplayPort; USB Type-C port HDMI port 2 USB 3.0 ports microSD card (non-bootable)
- Camera: Yes
- Touchpad: Yes
- Power: 3-cell
- Weight: 1.49 kg
