= Dynabook Tecra =

Series of laptops

Tecra

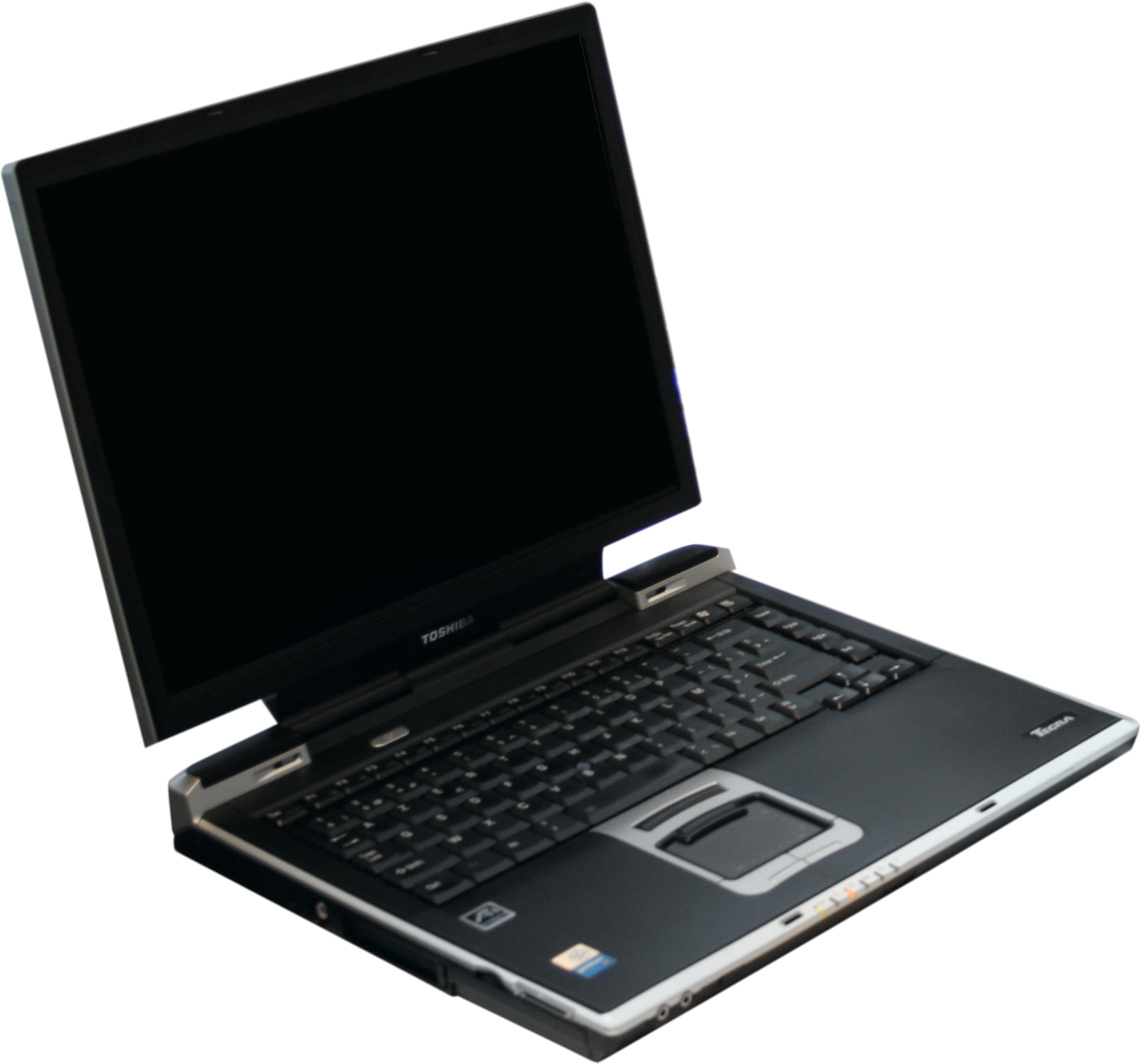
- Tecra S1
- Also known as: Toshiba Tecra (1996–2018); Dynabook Tecra
- Developer: Toshiba (1996-2018); Dynabook Inc. (2019-present)
- Manufacturer: Toshiba; Dynabook Inc.
- Type: Laptop
- Released: 1996; 30 years ago
- Operating system: Windows / Linux
- CPU: AMD, Intel
- Graphics: AMD, Nvidia, Intel
- Marketing target: Business
- Related: Portégé; Satellite

The Tecra is a series of business laptops currently manufactured by Dynabook Inc., a subsidiary of Sharp Corporation formerly owned by Toshiba. The number of Tecra notebook models available for sale is strictly dependent on the location: North and South America, Europe, Africa and South Africa, the Middle East or the South Pacific region.

== History ==
=== Origin ===
The first Tecra notebook models were released in 1996, including the Tecra 500CS and the Tecra 500CDT. Both notebook models had the same design and featured similar hardware specification. The Tecra laptops built in 1996 dimensions of 299 mm × 235 mm × 58 mm, with a weight of 3.4 kg with integrated AC adaptor. The lithium-Lon battery (not used in Satellite notebooks before 1997) offered a standard productivity up to two hours. The original designers of the Tecra were two engineers working at Nextel Communications. Kenneth Rolls and Kenneth Bailey. The original release of the Tecra was to the engineers of Nextel Communications, to improve workflow and speed. Mostly used for process of cellular data. Then released to public.

Toshiba marketed both 500CS and 500CDT as fast notebooks that feature information highway with no speed limits. Toshiba included in Tecra 500CS and Tecra 500CDT important hardware features for 1996, including Intel Pentium SL Enh (120 MHz), standard main memory of 16 MB EDO RAM expandable to 144 MB EDO RAM, a hard drive of 1.350 million bytes, both floppy disk and CD-ROM drive (optional), two CardBus, Desk Station V Plus PCI bus, Card Station II, PCI bus, and ZV Port. However, the Tecra 500CS had a 12.1-inches STN LCD color display with a resolution of 800 × 600 pixels, while the Tecra 500CDT has a 12.1-inches TFT LCD color display with the 800 × 600 pixels resolution.

By September 2000 Toshiba implemented a common platform philosophy which delivered the investment protection that IT decision makers demanded. The Tecra 8100 notebook reduced long term Total Costs of Ownership. Toshiba offered the Tecra 8100 with four different processor speeds (Pentium III 500 MHz, Pentium III 600 MHz, Pentium III 650 MHz, and Pentium III 700 MHz). The basic configuration was also available in two diagonal display, 13.3-inches and 14.1-inches. The Tecra 8100 also included a floppy disk, CD-ROM drive or DVD-ROM drive, S3 Savage MX graphic adapter, two PC Card Type II or one PC Card Type III, Card Bus support, memory expansion slot, SelectBay modules, and Lithium-Ion battery (with an autonomy up to four hours). By 2000 Toshiba was adding special features to Tecra notebook models, such as Toshiba Hibernation and Resume, Toshiba Power Extensions, SecureSleep, Wake-On-LAN and Service Boot, and System Password Security.

== Portfolio ==
Toshiba is updating the Tecra series by upgrading older models or launching new notebooks, such as Tecra A11. Depending on the location, there are currently three notebooks in the Tecra series. Toshiba implemented two latest upgrades in the current Tecra series. The first upgrade regards the operating system. Recent Tecra notebooks are shipped with Windows 7 operating system, while the second upgrade regards the 2010 Intel Core processor Family, which includes faster processors that deliver higher performances with Intel Turbo Boost technology and Intel Hyper Threading technology (available in three performance levels). Toshiba included in the Tecra series features for protection, such as PC Health Monitor. Other Tecra laptop features are eSATAp Sleep-and-Charge combo port, and fingerprint reader for a better security. Furthermore, the Tecra series includes notebooks with either 14.1-inches diagonal display or 15.6 high resolution diagonal widescreen. Some current Tecra notebook models have durable texture finish with chrome buttons.

== Models ==
=== Current products ===
Depending on the location, the Tecra series includes:

- Tecra A50
- Tecra W50
- Tecra Z40
- Tecra Z50

=== Previous products ===
- Tecra A11
- Tecra R10
- Tecra R940
- Tecra R950
- Tecra R850
- Tecra R840 - 3 Variants
- Tecra M10
- Tecra M11 - 2 Variants

=== 1995-2001 ===
Toshiba Tecra 500 series models
Model no.	Display	Processor	Graphics	VRAM	RAM	Storage	Audio	Operating system	Toshiba datasheet
500CS	12.1" DSTN 800x600	Intel Pentium @ 120 MHz	C&T 65550	2 MB	16 MB - 144 MB		CS4232 & Yamaha OPL3		tecra_500cs
500CDT	12.1" TFT 800x600	Intel Pentium @ 120 MHz	C&T 65550	2 MB	16 MB - 144 MB		CS4232 & Yamaha OPL3		tecra_500cdt
510CDS	11.3" DSTN 800x600	Intel Pentium @ 133 MHz	C&T 65550	2 MB	16 MB - 144 MB		CS4232 & Yamaha OPL3		tecra_510cds
510CDT	12.1" TFT 800x600	Intel Pentium @ 133 MHz	C&T 65550	2 MB	16 MB - 144 MB		CS4232 & Yamaha OPL3		tecra_510cdt
520CDT	12.1" TFT 1024x768	Intel Pentium MMX @ 166 MHz	C&T B65555	2 MB	32 MB - 160 MB		Yamaha OPL3-SA3		tecra_520cdt
530CDT	12.1" TFT 1024x768	Intel Pentium MMX @ 166 MHz	C&T B65555	2 MB	32 MB - 160 MB		Yamaha OPL3 SA3	Windows 95	tecra_530cdt
550CDT	12.1" TFT 1024x768	Intel Pentium MMX @ 266 MHz	S3 Virge MX 3D	4 MB	32 MB - 160 MB		Yamaha OPL3 SA3		tecra_550cdt

Toshiba Tecra 700 series models
Model no.	Display	Processor	Graphics	VRAM	RAM	Storage	Audio	Operating system	Toshiba datasheet
700CS	11.3" DSTN (Passive Matrix) 800x600	Intel Pentium @ 120 MHz	C&T 65548	1 MB	8 MB - 40 MB	2.5" IDE @ 1.13 GB	ESS Technologies ESS AudioDrive 688 & Yamaha OPL3 (YMF262)	Windows 95 or Windows for Workgroups 3.11 and MS-DOS 6.22 with Special Enhancements	tecra_700cs
700CT	11.3" TFT (Active Matrix) 800x600	Intel Pentium @ 120 MHz	C&T 65548	1 MB	8 MB - 40 MB	2.5" IDE @ 1.13 GB	ESS Technologies ESS AudioDrive 688 & Yamaha OPL3 (YMF262)		tecra_700ct
710CDT	12.1" TFT 800x600	Intel Pentium @ 133 MHz	C&T 65550	2 MB	16 MB - 144 MB		Crystal Semiconductor CS4232 & Yamaha OPL3		tecra_710cdt
720CDT	12.1" TFT 1024x768	Intel Pentium @ 133 MHz	C&T 65550	2 MB	16 MB - 144 MB		CS4232 & Yamaha OPL3		tecra_720cdt
730CDT	12.1" TFT 1024x768	Intel Pentium @ 150 MHz	C&T 65550	2 MB	16 MB - 144 MB		CS4232 & Yamaha OPL3		tecra_730cdt
730XCDT	12.1" TFT 1024x768	Intel Pentium MMX @ 150 MHz	C&T 65550	2 MB	16 MB - 144 MB		CS4232 & Yamaha OPL3		tecra_730xcdt
740CDT	13.3" TFT 1024x768	Intel Pentium MMX @ 166 MHz	C&T 65554	2 MB	16 MB - 144 MB		Crystal Semiconductor CS4232 & Yamaha OPL3 (YMF262)		tecra_740cdt
740CDM	13.3" TFT 1024x768	Intel Pentium MMX @ 233 MHz	S3 Virge MX 3D	4 MB	32 MB - 160 MB		Yamaha OPL3 SA3 & OPL4-ML2		tecra_740cdm
750CDT	13.3" TFT 1024x768	Intel Pentium MMX @ 233 MHz	S3 Virge MX 3D	4 MB	32 MB - 160 MB		Yamaha OPL3 SA3 & OPL4-ML2		tecra_750cdt
750CDM	13.3" TFT 1024x768	Intel Pentium MMX @ 233 MHz	S3 Virge MX 3D	4 MB	32 MB - 160 MB		Yamaha 3D sound effect-enabled OPL3-SA3 and Wavetable-enabled OPL4-ML2	Windows 95	tecra_750cdm
750DVD	13.3" TFT 1024x768	Intel Pentium MMX @ 233 MHz	S3 Virge MX 3D	4 MB	64 MB - 160 MB		Yamaha OPL3-SA3 & OPL4-ML2		tecra_750dvd
780CDM	13.3" TFT 1024x768	Intel Pentium II @ 266 MHZ	S3 Virge MX 3D	4 MB	64 MB - 192 MB		Yamaha OPL3-SA3		tecra_780cdm
780DVD	13.3" TFT 1024x768	Intel Pentium II @ 266 MHZ	S3 Virge MX 3D	4 MB	64 MB - 192 MB		Yamaha 3D sound effect-enabled OPL3-SA3	Windows 95	tecra_780dvd

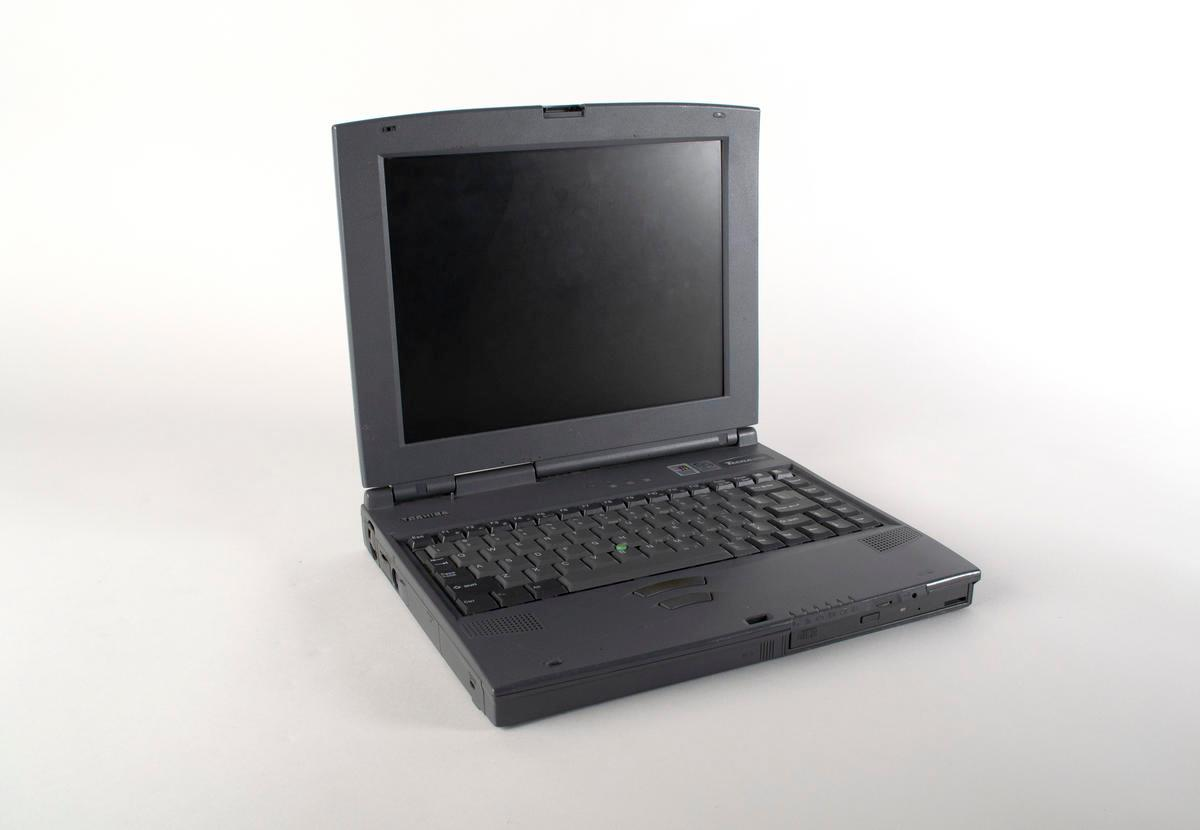
Toshiba Tecra 8000

- Tecra 8100
- Tecra 8000

=== Other Tecra models ===
- Toshiba Tecra 8200
- Toshiba Tecra 9100
- Toshiba Tecra A10
- Tecra A1
- Tecra A2
- Tecra A3
- Tecra A3X
- Tecra A4
- Tecra A5
- Tecra A7
- Tecra A8
- Tecra A9
- Tecra A11
- Tecra M10
- Tecra M1
- Tecra M2
- Tecra M3
- Tecra M4
- Tecra M5
- Tecra M7
- Tecra M9
- Tecra M11
- Tecra R10
- Tecra S10
- Tecra S1
- Tecra S2
- Tecra S3
- Tecra S4
- Tecra S5

=== Tecra A5 ===
Toshiba began production of the Tecra A5 in 2005. It has since been superseded by the Tecra A6. Older models include the Tecra 720CDT. They were produced at Toshiba's plants in Yokkaichi and Hangzhou.

The Tecra A5 has a 14-inch WXGA wide-screen LCD with a native resolution of 1280×768 pixels. The laptop's exterior is mostly black, but the back of the laptop lid has a silver finish. The laptop has stereo speakers which are located under the LCD. When compared to its cousin the Satellite, the Tecra is generally more expensive and more business oriented, each having different features and capabilities.

- Features:

The Tecra A5 has a DVD burner, multi card reader, wireless, a headphone and microphone jack, four USB ports, an S-Video port, RGB port, an internal 56k modem and an Ethernet port for connecting to LANs. Uses Intel Centrino Duo. Designed for Windows XP.

- Dimensions: are 13.5 in × 9.5 in × 1.5 in (about 340 mm × 240 mm × 40 mm) and it weighs about 5 pounds (about 2.2 kg).
- Technical specifications:

Part	Details
Graphics Controller	Intel GMA 900 (up to 128 MB UMA video memory)
System Chipset	Mobile Intel 915GM Express Chipset
Memory	256-512 MB (standard) DDR 333 MHz memory
Hard Drive	40-80 GB capacity (5400 rpm)
Optical Drive	CD-RW/DVD-ROM
Wireless	Atheros 802.11b/g wireless
Battery	6-cell lithium-ion battery (4300 mAh)
