= Dynabook Portégé =

Laptop model series

Portégé

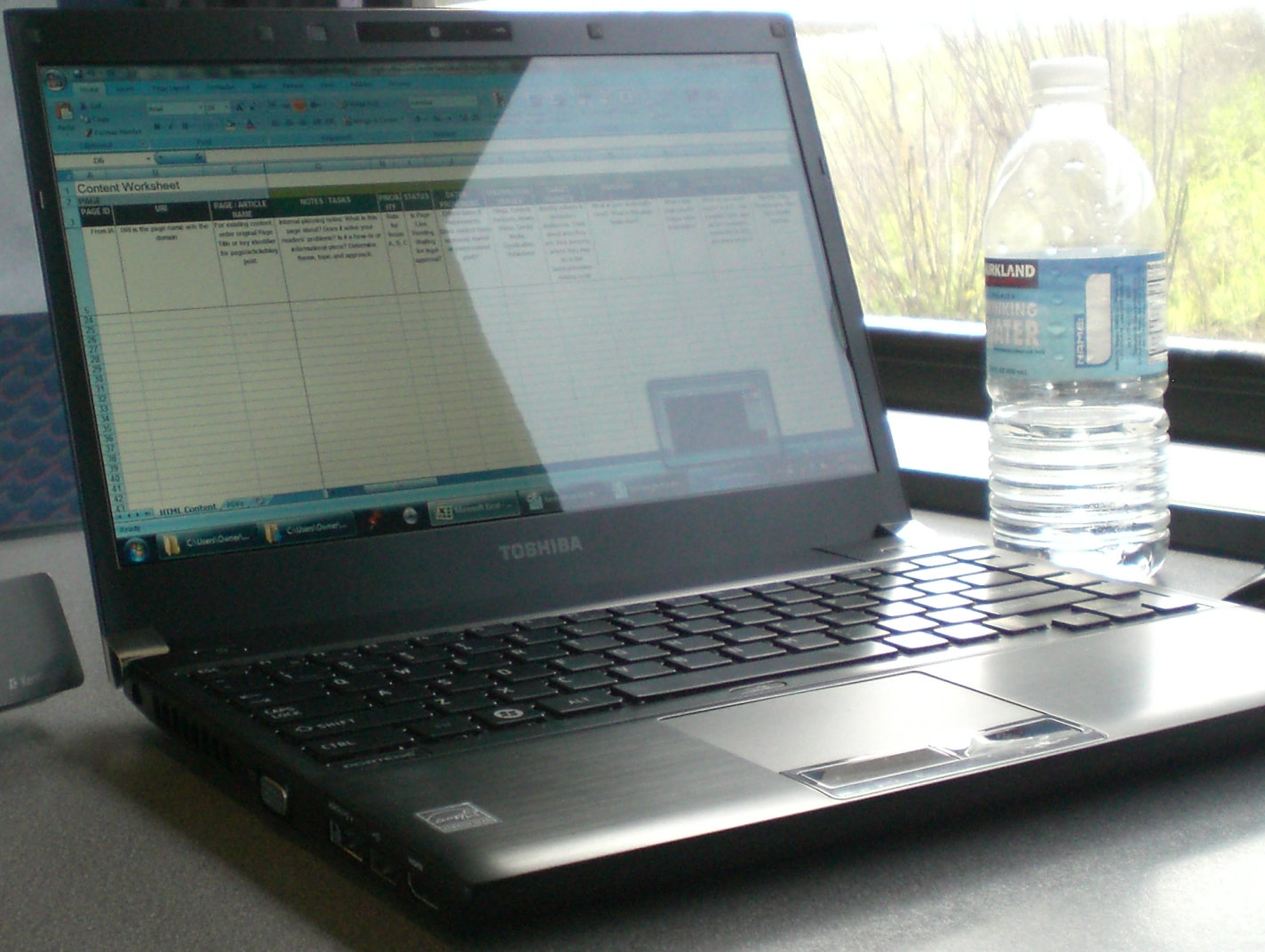
- Portégé R700
- Also known as: Toshiba Portégé (1993–2018); Dynabook Portégé
- Developer: Toshiba (1993-2018); Dynabook Inc. (2019-present)
- Manufacturer: Toshiba; Dynabook Inc.
- Type: Ultrabook; subnotebook
- Released: 1993; 33 years ago
- Operating system: Windows, Linux, OpenSolaris
- CPU: AMD, Intel
- Graphics: AMD, Nvidia, Intel
- Marketing target: Business

The Portégé is a range of business-oriented subnotebooks and ultrabooks manufactured by Dynabook Inc. From 1993 to 2018, the Portégé was manufactured by Toshiba's computer subsidiary before Sharp Corporation purchased majority interest in it.

== Overview ==
The Portégé series has a long line of several models, the latest being the 13.3-nch R30 series and the similar Z30 series. It is a lightweight series of laptops targeted to business professionals. Portégé laptops occasionally featured first-in-the-world technologies. The R500 was one such machine, first of its kind in terms of form factor, that provided an integrated DVD drive and was less than a kilogram in weight.

Portégés are designed to be mobile, with a focus on portability, style, and performance. Throughout their history, Portégé machines have been extolled due to their focus on long battery life. Furthermore, many high-end models in the Portégé line feature a Honeycomb Rib Structure, which makes the laptop stiffer and more durable. Many also come with the optional feature of a solid-state drive, which is more reliable than a traditional hard disk drive, as well as USB 3.0, which allows for faster data transfer.

Earlier models include the Portégé M780 and R700. Similar to the M750, the M780 features a flip and twist screen, which means it can be used as a notebook or a tablet. The device has a 12.1-inch LED-backlit display with a resolution of 1200×800 pixels, and comes with a stylus for scribbling notes, which slots into the side of the chassis when not being used. The M780 also has a 320 GB hard disk, and can be customized or upgraded to Intel Core i7 processor and 8 GB RAM.

Early 2011, Intel Core released their new Sandy Bridge processors. Following that release, Toshiba has released its newest range of Portégé notebooks. Worldwide, there may be more models, however, the Australian range is known as the R830. All have minimum i5-2410M processor, 4 GB of DDR3 RAM and Windows 7 Pro.

Following Toshiba's corporate issues, the Portégé line was not updated in the U.S. market from 2016. It returned to that market by Dynabook three years later. The sale to Sharp was completed on October 1, 2018.

== Models ==
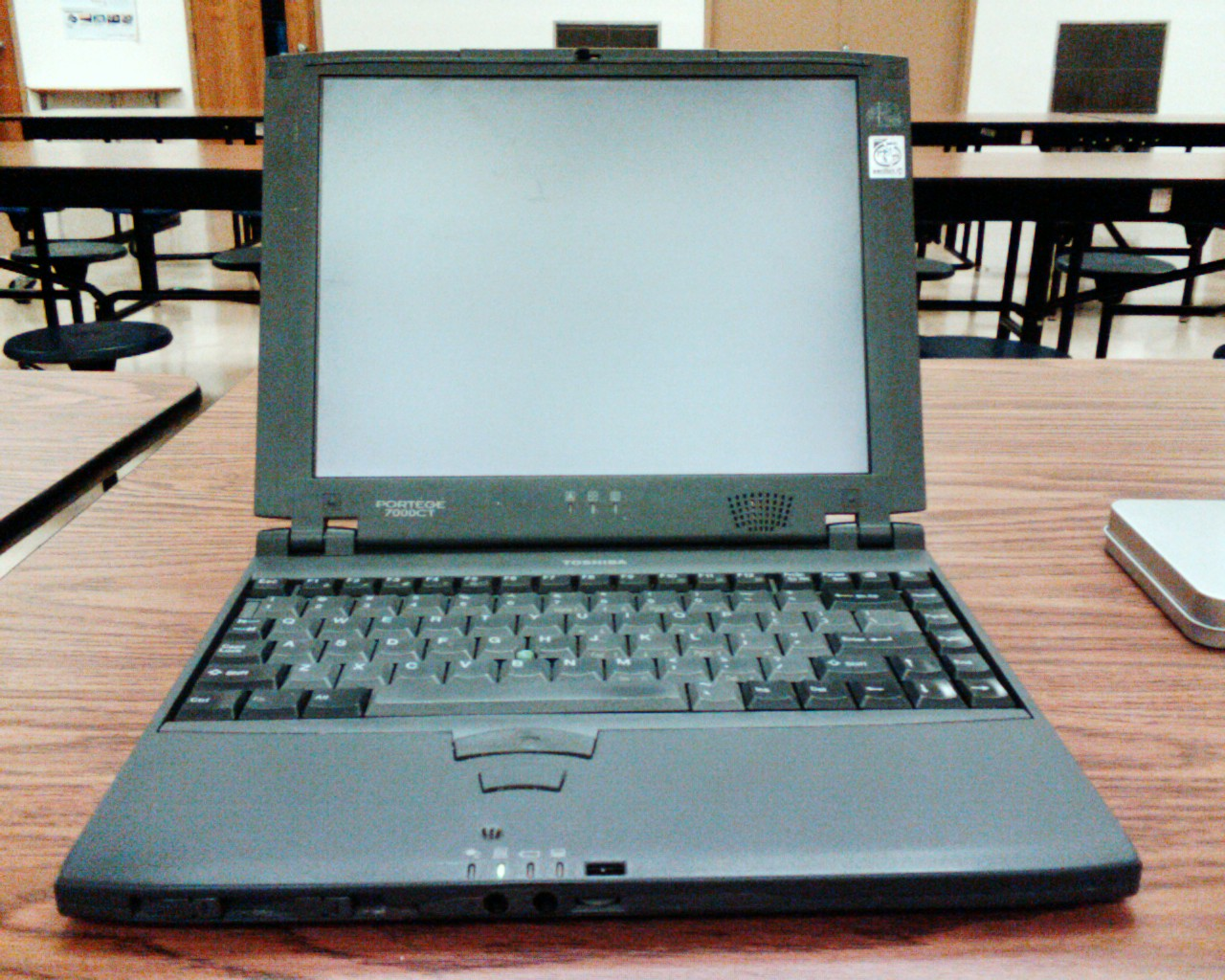
Toshiba Portege 7000ct

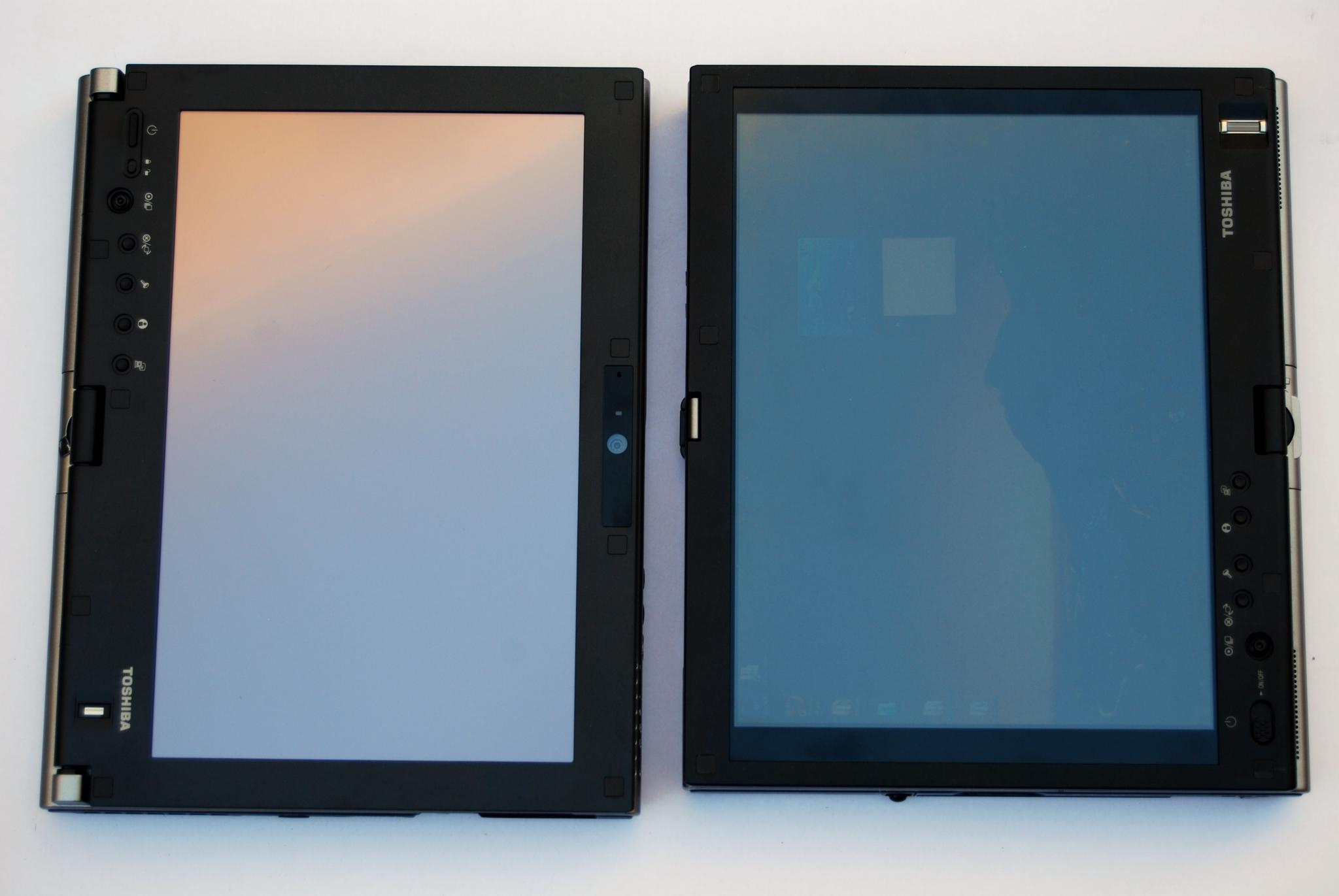
Portege M750 and M400 netvertible laptops

Model	Display	Processor options	Chipset	Graphics	RAM	Storage	Audio	Operating system	Dimensions	Weight	Release	List price (US$)
T3400CT	8.4"	80486 50 MHz		Western Digital	4 MB (20 MB Max)			MS Windows 3.1 and DOS 6.2		2 kg (4.4 lb)	1994	-
T3600CT/500	8.4"	80486DX2 50 MHz		Western Digital	4 MB (20 MB Max)					2.1 kg	1995	$4,395
610CT	9.5" VGA (640x480)	Intel Pentium @ 90 MHz		C&T F65546 @ 1 MB	8 MB @ 66 MHz (40 MB Max)		ESS Technologies ESS688 and Yamaha OPL3 (YMF262)	Windows for Workgroups 3.11 and DOS 6.22		4.8 lb (2.2 kg)	1996	-
620CT	10.4" SVGA (800x600)	Intel Pentium @ 100 MHz		C&T F65548 @ 1 MB	8 MB @ 66 MHz (40 MB Max)			Windows 95		-	1996	-
650CT	11.3" SVGA (800x600)	Intel Pentium 133 MHz		C&T HIQV32 (CT65550) @ 2 MB	16 MB @ 66 MHz (80 MB Max)		Crystal Semiconductor CS4232 and Yamaha OPL3 (YMF262)	Windows 95 or Windows for Workgroups 3.11 and MS-DOS 6.22		4.8 lb (2.2 kg)	1996	-
300CT	10.4" SVGA (1024x600)	Intel Pentium MMX @ 133 MHz		C&T F65554 (Rev c2) @ 2 MB	32 MB @ 66 MHz (64 MB Max)		Yamaha OPL3-SA3	Windows 95 or Windows for Workgroups 3.11 and MS-DOS 6.22 with Enhancements		3.9 lb (1.8 kg)	1997	$3,499
660CDT	11.3" SVGA (800x600)	Intel Pentium @ 150 MHz		C&T F65554 @ 2 MB	16 MB @ 66 MHz (80 MB Max)		Yamaha OPL3-SA2	Windows 95 or Windows for Workgroups 3.11 and MS-DOS 6.22 with Special Enhancements		5.6 lb (2.5 kg)	-	-
320CT	10.4" SVGA (1024x600)	Intel Pentium MMX @ 266 MHz		C&T 65555 @ 2 MB	32 MB @ 66 MHz (96 MB max)					3.9 lb (1.8 kg)	1997	-
3010CT 3015CT	10.4" SVGA	Intel Pentium MMX @ 266 MHz		NeoMagic 2160 2 MB	32 MB @ 66 MHz (96 MB max)					1.32 kg	1998	$1,999
3020CT	10.4" SVGA	Intel Pentium MMX @ 300 MHz		NeoMagic 2160 2 MB	32 MB @ 66 MHz (96 MB max)		Yamaha OPL3-SA3	Microsoft Windows 98		1.32 kg	1999	$1,799
3025CT	10.4" SVGA	Intel Pentium MMX @ 300 MHz		NeoMagic 2160 2 MB	32 MB @ 66 MHz (96 MB max)		Yamaha OPL3-SA3	Microsoft Windows 98		1.32 kg	1999	$1,999
3110CT	10.4" SVGA (800×600)	Intel Pentium II-M 300 MHz		Trident Cyber9525 2.5 MB	64 MB 66 MHz (128 MB max)		ESS ES1978 (16-bit stereo)	Microsoft Windows 98		1.55 kg	2000	-
3410CT	10.4" SVGA (800x600)	Intel Celeron-M @ 500 MHz		S3 Savage IX	64 MB (192 MB Max)					1.55 kg	2000	-
3440CT	11.3" XGA	Pentium III-M @ 500 MHz		S3 Savage IX @ 8 MB	64 MB @ 100 MHz (192 MB Max)		Yamaha YMF752 (16-bit stereo)	Windows 95; Windows 98 SE; Windows NT 4.0 SP5; Windows 2000		1.55 kg	2000	-
3480CT	11.3" XGA	Pentium III-M @ 600 MHz		S3 Savage IX @ 8 MB	64 MB @ 100 MHz (192MB Max)		Yamaha YMF752 (16-bit stereo)	Windows 98 SE; Windows NT 4.0 SP5; Windows 2000		1.55 kg	2000	-
3490CT	11.3" XGA	Pentium III-M @ 700 MHz		S3 Savage IX @ 8 MB	128MiB PC100 onboard, expands to 256MiB. PC100 MicroDIMM		Yamaha YMF743 (16-bit stereo)			1.55 kg	2001	-
7000CT	12.1" XGA	Pentium II-M 266 MHz (Tonga)		NeoMagic 2160 (128-bit Data Bus) @ 2 MB	32 MB 66 MHz (160 MB max)		Yamaha 3D sound effect-enabled OPL3-SA3	Windows 95		4.1 lb (1.9 kg)	1998	-
7010CT	12.1" XGA	Pentium II-M 300 MHz (Tonga)		NeoMagic 2200 (256-bit Data Bus) @ 2.5 MB	32 MB 66 MHz (160 MB max)		Yamaha 3D sound effect-enabled OPL3-SA3			4.1 lb (1.9 kg)	1998	-
7020CT	13.3" XGA	Pentium II-M 366 MHz (Dixon)	Intel 443DX (northbridge), Intel 371EB (southbridge)	NeoMagic 2200 (256-bit Data Bus) @ 2.5 MB	64 MB @ 66 MHz (192 MB max)	6.4 billion byte Ultra DMA33, 2.5”	ES1918 (Audio codec), ESS ES1978S (Maestro-2E) and software-enabled Wavetable synthesis sound		11.6” (L) x 9.5” (W) x 1.1” (H)	4.17 lbs (1.891 kg)	1999	-
7140CT	13.3'' XGA	Pentium III-M 500 MHz	Intel 443BX (northbridge), Intel 371MB (southbridge)	Trident CyberBlade e4-128 @ 4 MB	64 MB @ 100 MHz (192 MB max)	6.0 billion bytes Ultra DMA33, 2.5"	ESS ES1978S and ES1918 (codec chip)		11.7" (W) x 9.5" (D) x 1.1" (H)	4.4 lb (2.0 kg)	1999	-
7200CT	13.3" XGA	Pentium III-M @ 600 MHz with SpeedStep Technology		Trident CyberBlade e4-128 @ 4 MB	64 MB @ 100 MHZ (SDRAM)(320 MB max)		ESS ES1978S (16-bit stereo)			4.4 lb (2.0 kg)	2000	-
7200CTe	13.3" XGA	Pentium III-M @ 600 MHz with SpeedStep Technology		S3 Savage IX @ 8 MB	64 MB @ 100 MHZ (SDRAM)(320 MB max)		ESS ES1978S (16-bit stereo)			4.4 lb (2.0 kg)	2001	-
2000	12.1" XGA	Pentium III-M @ 750 MHz		Trident CyberBlade XP Ai1	256 MB 133MHz SDRAM (512 MB max)		Ali M1535B integrated software sound			1.18 kg	2002	$2,199
2010	12,1" XGA	Intel Pentium III-M @ 866 MHz with SpeedStep Technology		Trident CyberALADDiN-T	256 MB 133 MHz SDRAM (512 MB max)					1.18 kg		
3500	12.1" XGA	Pentium III-M 1.33 GHz		Trident CyberALADDiN-T	256 MB 133 MHz SDRAM (1024 MB max)					1.85 kg	2002	$2,299
3505	12.1" XGA	Pentium III-M 1.33 GHz		Trident CyberALADDiN-T	256 MB 133 MHz SDRAM (1024 MB max)					1.85 kg	2002	$2,499
4000/4005	12.1" XGA	Pentium III-M 750 MHz		Trident CyberBlade XP 2D/3D	256 MB 133 MHz SDRAM (1024 MB max)		Integrated ALi M1535 PCI bus sound chip	Windows 98SE; Windows 2000; Windows XP Professional		2.0 kg		
4010	12.1" XGA	Pentium III-M @ 933 MHz		Trident CyberALADDiN-T	256 MB 133 MHz SDRAM (1024 MB max)		ALi M1535B integrated software sound	Windows 2000 Professional; Windows XP Professional		1.9 kg		
R100	12.1" XGA	Intel Pentium M ULV Series with Centrino Mobile Technology: Pentium M ULV 900 (0.9 GHz); Pentium M ULV 1.0 (1.0 GHz); Pentium M ULV 713 (1.1 GHz)		Trident XP4m32 LP @ 16 MB	512 MB DDR (1280 MB max)					1.1 kg	2004	-
M100	12.1" XGA	Intel Pentium M ULV 753 (1.2 GHz) with Centrino Mobile Technology		Intel 855GM	-		Integrated software sound AD1981B			2 kg	2003	-
A200	12.1" XGA	Intel Pentium M ULV (1.6 GHz)		Intel 855GM	-					2 kg	2005	$2,199
M200/M205	12.1" SXGA+ (1400x1050)	Pentium M (1.5 GHz); Pentium M 735 (1.7 GHz); Pentium M 745 (1.8 GHz); Pentium M 755 (2.0 GHz)		NVIDIA GeForce FX 5200 Go	256 MB - 2048 MB PC2700 DDR 333 MHz SDRAM					2.0 kg	2004	-
R200	12.1" XGA	Pentium M ULV 753 (1.2 GHz); Pentium M ULV 773 (1.3 GHz)		Intel GMA 900	-					1.3 kg	2005	$2,099
M400	12.1" WXGA	Core 2 Solo U2200 (1.2 GHz); Core 2 Duo T5600 (1.83 GHz)		Intel GMA 950	-					1.3 kg	2006	$2,???
R400	12.1" LCD	Intel Core Duo U2500 (2 x 1.2 GHz)		Intel GMA 950	2 GB PC2-5300 DDR2-533/667 (4 GB max)					1.7 kg	2007	$2,599
R500	12.1" WXGA	Intel Core 2 Duo U Series: Core 2 Duo U7600 (2×1.2 GHz); Core 2 Duo U7700 (2×1.33 GHz)		Intel GMA 950	-					1.1 kg	2008	$2,599
A600	12.1" WXGA	Intel Core 2 Duo SU9300 (2×1.2 GHz)		Intel GMA 4500MHD	-					1.46 kg	2008	-
R600	12.1" WXGA	Intel Core 2 Duo SU9400 (2×1.4 GHz)		Intel GMA 4500MHD	-					1.1 kg	2008	-
M700	12.1" WXGA	Intel Core 2 Duo T Series: Core 2 Duo T7250 (2 GHz); Core 2 Duo T8300 (2.4 GHz); Core 2 Duo T9300 (2.5 GHz)		Intel GMA X3100	2 GB PC2-6400 DDR2-800 (4 GB max)					2 kg	2007	$1,699-$1,799
M750	12.1" WXGA	Core 2 Duo T6600; Core 2 Duo P8400; (2×2.26 GHz); Core 2 Duo P8600 (2x2.4 GHz); Core 2 Duo T9400		Intel GMA 4500MHD	2 GB PC2-6400 DDR2-800 (4 GB max)					2 kg	2009	$1,279 – $1,799
M780	12.1" WXGA	Intel Core i3-330M; Intel Core i5-M520; Intel Core i7-620M		Intel GMA 4500MHD	2 GB-4 GB @ 1066 MHz DDR3 (8 GB max)					2 kg	2009	$1,279 - $1,699 - $1,799
M800	13.3" WXGA	Intel Core 2 Duo T6400 @ 2 GHz		Intel GMA 4500MHD	-					2 kg	2008	-
R700	13.3" WXGA (1366×768)	Intel Core i3-350M 2.26 GHz; Intel Core i3-370M 2.40 GHz; Intel Core i3-380M 2.53 GHz; Intel Core i5-520M 2.40 GHz (turbo:2.93 GHz); Intel Core i5-560M 2.66 GHz (turbo:3.20 GHz); Intel Core i7-620M 2.66 GHz (turbo:3.33 GHz)		Intel Graphics Media Accelerator HM55	2 GB–4 GB DDR3-1066 (8 GB max)					1.45 kg	2010	€800–€2300
R705-P25	13.3" Matte WXGA (1366×768)	Intel Core i3-350M @ 2.26 GHz		Intel HD	4 GB DDR3-1333 (8 GB max)					1.45 kg	2010	$889.99
R835-p56X	13.3" Matte WXGA (1366×768)	Intel Core i5-2410M (Sandy bridge) 2.3 GHz 2.9 GHz (turbo)		Intel HD	4 GB DDR3-1333 (8 GB max)					1.45 kg	2011	$799.99
Z835-P330 & -P360	13.3" HD TFT LED (1366x768)	Intel Core i3-2367M @ 1.4 GHz		Intel HD Graphics 3000	4 GB DDR3-1333 (6 GB max)					1.12 kg	2011	$899.99
Z835-P370 & P372	13.3" HD TFT LED (1366x768)	Intel Core i5-2467M 1.6 GHz (2.3 GHz turbo)		Intel HD Graphics 3000	6 GB DDR3 @ 1333 MHz (6 GB max)					1.12 kg	2012	$1,049
Z930	13.3" HD TFT (1366×768)	3rd Gen Intel Core i3/i5/i7		Intel HD Graphics	4 GB DDR3 1600 MHz (10 GB max)					1.09 kg	2012	€1,300
R30-A	13.3" HD TFT (1366×768, 200 nits)	4th Gen Intel Core i3/i5/i7		Intel HD Graphics	4 GB DDR3L @ 1600 MHz (16 GB max)					1.53 kg	2013	$799.99
Z10T-A	11.6" FHD (1920x1080)	3rd and 4th Gen Intel Core: i5-3339Y @ 1.50 GHz; i5-3439Y @ 1.50 GHz; i5-4210Y @ 1.50 GHz; i7-4610Y @ 1.70 GHz		Intel HD Graphics	4/8 GB DDR3L (8 GB on i7-4610Y model) @ 1600 MHz (4/8 GB max depending on configuration)			Windows 8.0/8.1 Pro		1.44 kg	2013	$1499
Z30-A	13.3" HD TFT (1366x768, 300 nits)	Intel 4th Generation Core i3/i5/i7 4000-series		Intel HD Graphics	4 GB DDR3L @ 1600 MHz (16 GB max)					1.20 kg	2013	$899.99
A30-D (Build to order)	13.3" HD TFT (1366x768); 13.3" FHD (1920x1080)	7th Gen Intel Core: i5-7200U @ 2.5 GHz; i5-7300U @ 2.6 GHz; i7-7500U @ 2.7 GHz; i7-7600U @ 2.8 GHz		Intel HD Graphics 620	4 GB DDR4-2133 (16 GB max)					1.39 kg	2016	$994-$1,969
X20W-E (Build to order)	12.5" FHD (1920x1080)	7th and 8th Gen Intel Core: i5-7200U 2.5 GHz; i5-7300U 2.6 GHz; i7-7500U 2.7 GHz; i7-7600U 2.8 GHz; i5-8250U 1.6 GHz; i5-8350U @ 1.7 GHz; i7-8550U @ 1.8 GHz; i7-8650U @ 1.9 GHz		Intel HD Graphics 620 (7th gen. Intel processors); Intel UHD Graphics 620 (8th gen. Intel processors)	8 GB LPDDR3 @ 2133 MHz (16 GB max)					1.10 kg	2017	$1,564-2,679
X30-D	13.3" FHD (1920x1080)	7th Gen Intel Core: i3-7100U @ 2.4 GHz; i5-7200U @ 2.5 GHz		Intel HD Graphics 620		128 GB, 256 GB, 512 GB m.2 PCIe NVMe SSD					2017	$1,449-$2,109
X30T-E	13.3" FHD (1920x1080)	7th and 8th Gen Intel Core: i5-7200U @ 2.5 GHz; i5-7300U vPRO @ 2.6 GHz		Intel UHD Graphics 620 or Intel HD Graphics 620							2018	
X30-F	13.3"	8th Gen Intel Core: i3-8145U @ 2.1 GHz		Intel UHD Graphics 620							2019	
A30-E	13.3"	8th Gen Intel Core: i3-8130U (2.2 GHz, up to 3.4 GHz, 4M Cache)		Intel UHD Graphics 620			Stereo speakers enhanced with DTS Sound				2019	
X30L-G	13.3"	10th Gen Intel Core: i5-10210U Quad Core (1.6 GHz up to 4.2 GHz, 6M Cache); i7-10510U Quad Core Processor (1.8 GHz, up to 4.9 GHz, 8M Cache); i5-10310U Quad Core vPRO(1.7Hz, up to 4.4GHz, 6M Cache); i7-10610U Quad Core vPRO (1.8 GHz, up to 4.9 GHz, 6M Cache); i7-10810U 6 Cores vPRO (1.1 GHz, up to 4.9 GHz, 12M Cache)		Intel UHD Graphics 620			Stereo speakers enhanced with DTS Sound	Windows 10			2020	
X40L-K	14"			Intel Iris Xe			Four speaker systems enhanced with DTS Atmos sound technology	Windows 11 Pro			2022	
X30L-K	13.3"						Stereo speakers enhanced with DTS Atmos sound technology	Windows 11 Pro			2022	
Z40L-N	14.0" WUXGA (16:10) Anti-Glare (400 nits), IPS-Technology, resolution 1920x1200, Eyesafe Display Certified; 14.0” WUXGA (16:10) Anti-Glare (300 nits) with Touchscreen, IPS-Technology, resolution 1920x1200			Intel Arc 130V GPU (8 GB); Intel Arc 140V GPU (16 GB)		256GB/512GB/1TB/2TB NVMe M.2 PCIe Gen4 SSD	Stereo speaker system supported by Dolby Atmos technology+ AI-assisted noise reduction					

== Bibliography ==
- Toshiba Corporation. Toshiba Portégé 300CT User's Guide. Toshiba Corporation, 1997.
