= Acer smartphones =

Series of mobile phone models

This is a list of smartphones manufactured by Acer. They either run Android or Windows Mobile.

== beTouch ==
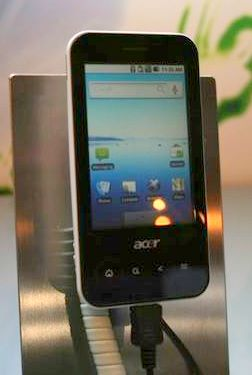
Acer beTouch E400

The Acer beTouch is the second smartphone line realized from the company since it the phone manufacturer E-ten in 2009. The series is focused on social networking, with direct links to Facebook, Twitter and other social networks.

=== E100/101 ===
The Acer beTouch E100/101 is based on Windows Mobile 6.5 and is powered by 528 MHz CPU. It was released in October 2009.

==== Main features ====
Acer beTouch E100/101 is a Windows Mobile (6.5) touchscreen phone. Both feature 3.2-inch WQVGA touch display, 2-megapixel camera, GPS and supports HSDPA networks. The homescreen can be customised with a number of apps and widgets, including the Facebook, Google Search and YouTube applications which come pre-installed. While the beTouch E100 is compatible with networks high speed 3G +, the beTouch E101 it will not work in EDGEmode.

== neoTouch ==
The Acer neoTouch is a smartphone series is the third smartphone series realized from the company since it acquired phone manufacturer E-ten in 2009, and the first to feature the Windows Mobile 6.5 OS

=== S200 ===
The Acer neoTouch S200 (also known as Acer neoTouch F1) is a Windows Mobile 6.5 designed for a business use. The Acer neoTouch was launched in October 2009 and is the second phone on the market, after the Toshiba TG01, with a 1 GHz Snapdragon processor.

==== Features ====
The following specifications are those found on the Acer website:

- Processing: Qualcomm QSD8250 1 GHz processor
- OS: Windows Mobile 6.5 with Internet Explorer 6
- Screen: 3.8" WVGA Touchscreen Display with Ambient light sensor
- Connectivity: WiFi 802.11 b/g & Bluetooth 2.1
- Camera: 5MP autofocus with LEDflash and VGA video recording

===== Windows Mobile 6.5 =====
Windows 6.5 is an upgrade to Windows Mobile 6.1 that was released to manufacturers on May 11, 2009. This update includes new added features, such as a revamped GUI and a new screen with vertically scrollable labels. It also includes the new Internet Explorer Mobile 6 browser.

=== P300 ===
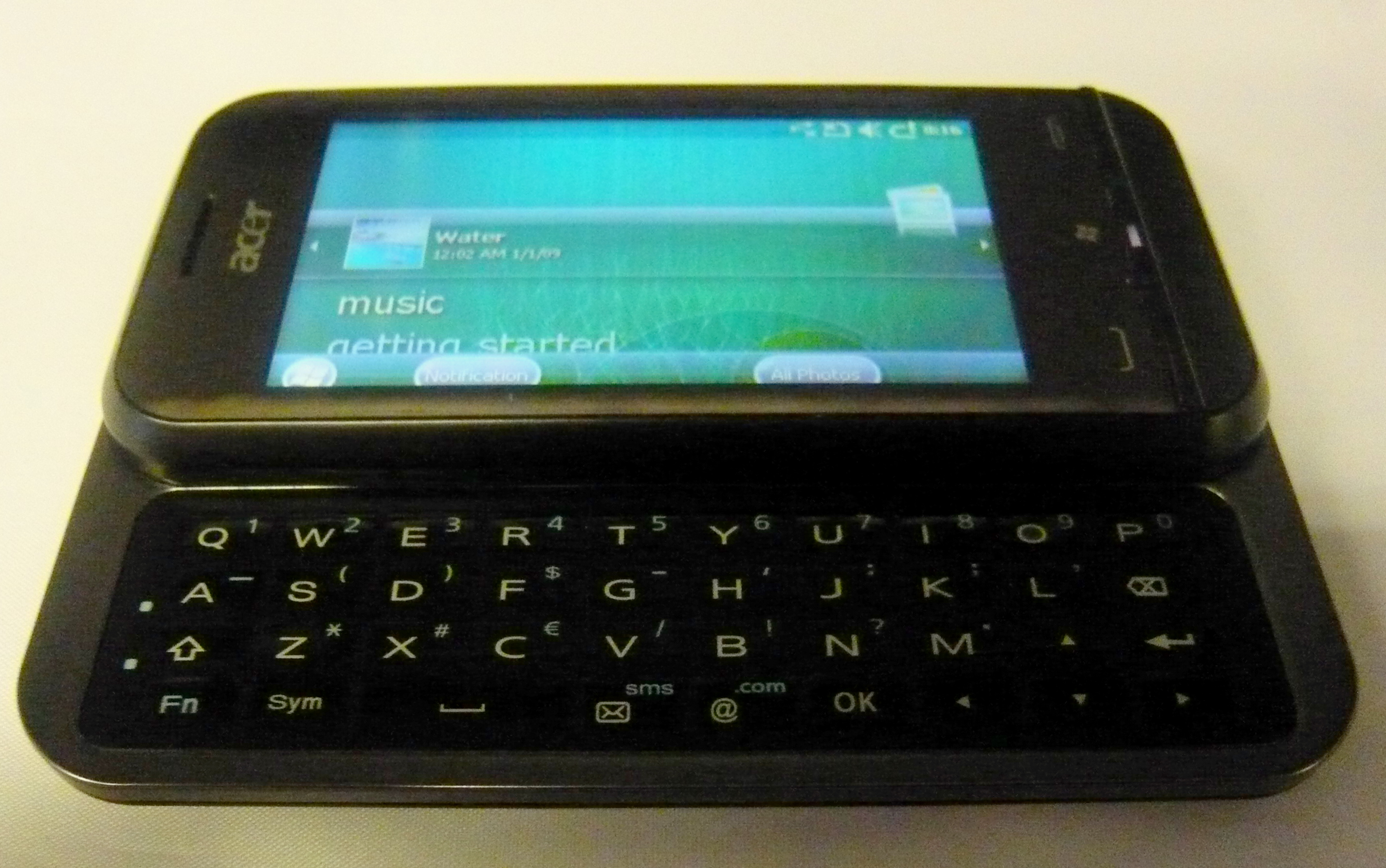
Acer Aspire P300 Smartphone

The Acer neoTouch P300 runs Windows Mobile 6.5.3. It was unveiled at the Mobile World Congress 2010 in Barcelona and it is officially available from March 2010. It has a side-slider form factor with QWERTY keyboard and features a WQVGA touchscreen, 3.2MP camera, A-GPS, Wi-Fi and is powered by 528 MHz processor.

==== Main features ====
The specifications according to Acer Inc website:

- Keyboard: QWERTY keyboard
- OS: Windows Mobile 6.5.3
- Processor: Qualcomm 7225 528 MHz
- Display: 3.2" WQVGA LCD touch screen
- Camera: 3.2 MP with autofocus
- Connectivity: 3G UMTS: 2100 MHz; WiFi: 802.11 b/g; Bluetooth 2.0
- Battery:Li-Po 970 mAh
- Size: 110 × 55 × 15.1 mm
- Weight: 130.6 g

=== P400 ===
Acer neoTouch P400
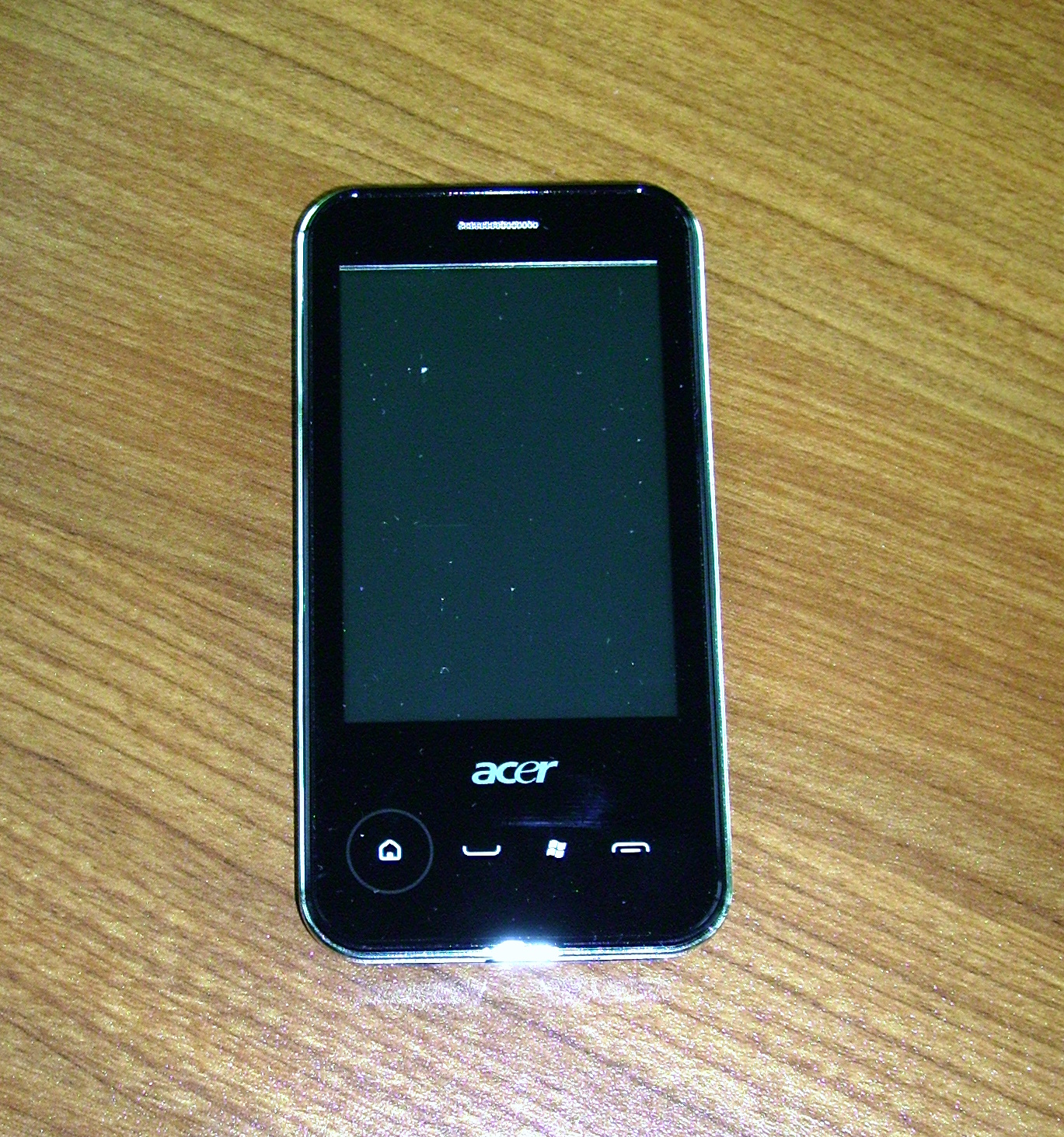
- Manufacturer: Acer Inc.
- Product family: Acer neoTouch series
- Operating system: Microsoft Windows Mobile 6.5.3
- CPU: 600 MHz Qualcomm 7227 processor
- Display: 320 x 480 px, 65,536 color, touchscreen display
- Camera: 3.15megapixel with auto focus
- Connectivity: Wi-Fi (802.11b/g), Bluetooth 2.1+EDR, ExtUSB, A-GPS; Micro SD slot, Micro USB
- Dimensions: 115x59.3X12 mmm
- Weight: 125 G

The Acer neoTouch P400 is a smartphone designed by Acer Inc. After using Android on phones such as the Acer beTouch E110 and Liquid A1, Acer has returned to Microsoft’s operating system. It shares the hardware and design with the Acer beTouch E400 but it runs Microsoft Windows Mobile 6.5.3 operating system that brings a more finger-friendly user interface. The neoTouch P400 was first introduced at the Mobile World Congress 2010 in Barcelona.
