= Home health care software =

Home health care software sometimes referred to as home care software or home health software falls under the broad category of health care information technology (HIT). HIT is “the application of information processing involving both computer hardware and software that deals with the storage, retrieval, sharing, and use of health care information, data, and knowledge for communication and decision making” Home health software is designed specifically for companies employing home health providers, as well as government entities who track payments to home health care providers.

== History ==
The first use of home health care software was in the 1990s, with companies making software based on the Omaha system of software. The first software was made available for public health departments, nurse-managed centers, and community clinics. The use of home health care software increased with the technologies of cloud computing, telehealth and business analytical tools. Implementing these technologies with home health software is attributed to the enhancement of quality care at home, and reduction of fraud. During the early stages of 2000s, the home health care software industry expanded from simple databases to agencies being able to transmit electronic health records. There was also an increase in the available types of software as a result of software vendors working directly with health care providers.

GrandPad is designed to reduce loneliness in older people.

== Types of software ==
There are clinical and non-clinical applications of home health care software. Including types such as agency software, hospice solutions, clinical management systems, telehealth solutions, and electronic visit verification. Depending on the type of software used, companies can track health care employee visits to patients, verify payroll, and document patient care. Governments can also use home health care software to verify visits from providers who bill them for services. Use of some software is mandated by government agencies such as OASIS assessment information that must be transmitted electronically by home health care providers.

=== Agency software ===
Agency software is used by home health care providers for office use and is a subset of medical practice management software used by inpatient clinics and doctors offices. Agency software is used for billing, paying vendors, staff scheduling, and maintaining records associated with the business. Agency software can be standalone or part of software packages, that include electronic visit verification to track hours of employees and time spent on home visits and patient care. Agency software can be purchased or leased through various vendors.

Agency software can range from Medical Home Health EMRs, Hospice EMRs, or non-medical Home Care Software. There are additional sub-categories of home health and related software solutions.

=== Electronic visit verification ===
Electronic visit verification (often referred to as EVV) is a method used to verify home healthcare visits to ensure patients are not neglected and to cut down on fraudulently documented home visits. EVV monitors locations of caregivers, and is mandated by certain states, including Texas and Illinois. Other states do not mandate it, but use it as part of its Medicaid fraud oversight, created by the passing of the Affordable Care Act in 2010. It is also widely used by employers of home healthcare providers to verify employee's locations and hours of work as well as document patient care.

=== Outcome and assessment information set (OASIS) ===
Home health care providers that participate in Medicaid are required to report specific data about patient care known as Outcome and Assessment Information Set-C (OASIS-C). Data includes health status, functional status, and support system information. The data is used to establish a measurement of patient home health care options. Home health care software allows health care providers to obtain and transmit such data while on location with a patient. Data collection is mandated by the Centers for Medicare and Medicaid Services, a division of the United States Department of Health and Human Services. Software for collecting and transmitting data is free through CMM and can also be purchased through private vendors as an add-on to other home health care software.

== Software delivery platforms ==
=== On-site server based model ===
The software is hosted on servers located and maintained on-site at the agency. The localization of the data provides the agency direct access to the computers hosting their software and may also require the agency to maintain the technology that hosts the software.

=== Cloud based software model ===
The software is deployed on a cloud system maintained by the software vendor. The off-site maintenance of the cloud system results in a lower cost to the home health agency and provides access to the agency's data from off-site locations.

== See also ==
- Health informatics
- List of open-source health software
- Medical record
