= Acer Liquid Metal =

Smartphone manufactured by Acer Inc.

Liquid MT (Metal)
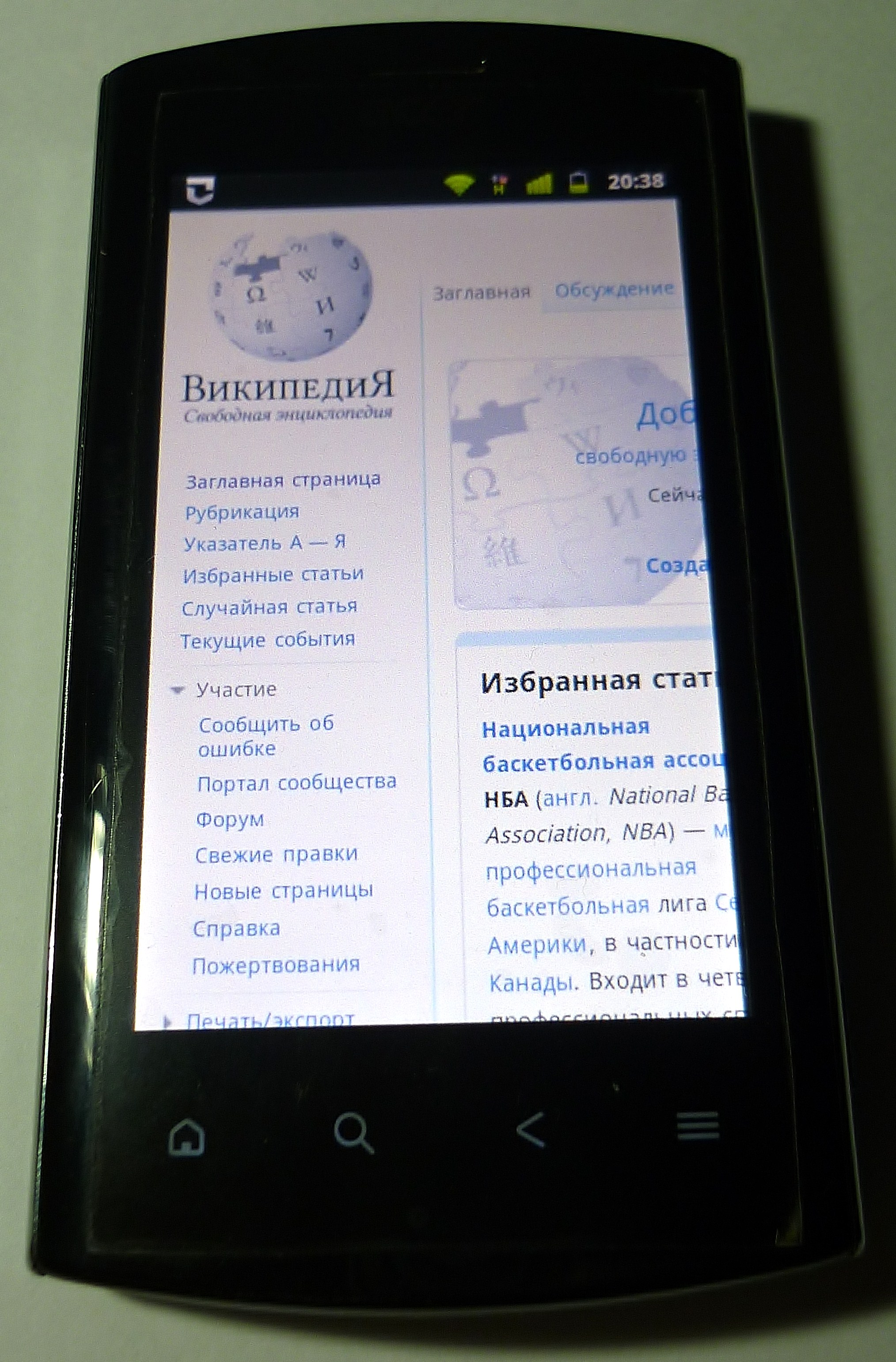
- A picture of the Liquid MT (Metal)
- Manufacturer: Acer Inc.
- Predecessor: Acer Liquid E
- Successor: Acer Liquid E2
- Dimensions: 115 x 63 x 13.5 millimetres
- Weight: 135 g (5 oz) (battery included)
- Operating system: Android 2.2 Froyo (Upgradeable to Android 2.3.5 Gingerbread)
- Removable storage: microSD, up to 32 GB
- Battery: Li-Ion 1500 mAh
- Rear camera: 5 MP, 2560х1920 pixels, autofocus
- Display: TFT LCD 3.6” WVGA multi-touch capacitive screen, 16 M colors
- Connectivity: Bluetooth 2.0 + EDR; Wi-Fi 802.11g, GPS with A-GPS

Acer Liquid MT (or Liquid Metal) is a smartphone from Acer that runs the Android operating system. After some rumors the smartphone was officially unveiled in October 2010. The smartphone runs Android 2.2 (Froyo) operating system and it is powered by an 800 MHz Qualcomm MSM7230 processor. It has 512 MB of RAM and 512 MB ROM. The device is capable of 4-finger-multitouch input and has integrated GPS, along with a 5 megapixel camera.

== Specifications ==
=== Hardware ===
The specifications according to the Acer website in October 2010:

- Size and weight: 115 x 63 x 13.5 135 g
- Screen: LCD 3.6” WVGA multi-touch capacitive screen, 16 M colors
- Connectivity: HSPA 14.4 Mbit/s, WiFi and Bluetooth
- Social applications: Built-in Facebook and UberSocial applications

The Liquid Metal is available in two colors: silver and brown

=== Software ===
Acer Liquid Metal ships with Android 2.2 Froyo. In October 2011 the Android 2.3.5 Gingerbread update for the Liquid MT was officially released by Acer.

== See also ==
- Acer Liquid A1
- Acer Liquid E
- Galaxy Nexus
- List of Android devices
