= Stan Shih =

Taiwanese businessman (born 1944)

- 施振榮
- Stan Shih in 2026
- Born: Se Shin'ei (施振榮 in Japanese); 18 December 1944 (age 81); Taichū Prefecture, Taiwan, Empire of Japan
- Education: National Chiao Tung University (BS, MS)
- Known for: President and Chairman of Acer Inc.
- Spouse: Carolyn Yeh
- Children: 3

Stan Chen-Jung Shih (Chinese: 施振榮; pinyin: Shī Zhènróng; Wade–Giles: Shih Chen-Jung; Tâi-lô: Si Tsìn-îng; born 18 December 1944) is a Taiwanese businessman and engineer who is the co-founder and honorary chairman of Acer Inc.

Shih has also been involved in philanthropy and public service, including founding the Stan Shih Foundation and serving as Taiwan's Special Envoy at APEC in 2007 and 2026. He has also held positions on the boards of various organizations, such as TSMC.

== Early life ==
Stan Shih was born on December 18, 1944, in Lukang, Changhua County, Taiwan, which was under Japanese rule at the time. His father died when he was three years old, and he was primarily raised by his mother, Chen Hsiu-Lien. To support the family, Chen ran a small business selling stationery items, duck eggs, lottery tickets, and incense candles, with Shih assisting from a young age.

As a child, Shih was reserved and introverted. Initially, he showed a stronger interest in the liberal arts but did not excel academically. However, his focus shifted after he won first place in a science and mathematics competition during high school, which encouraged him to pursue those subjects more seriously. He graduated from high school in 1962 and later enrolled at National Chiao Tung University (NCTU), where he studied electronic engineering at the Electronic Engineering Research Institute.

During his time at NCTU, Shih became more outgoing and actively participated in campus activities. Despite opportunities to study abroad, he chose to remain in Taiwan to stay close to his mother, eventually obtaining a bachelor’s and master's degree in 1971.

== Family ==
Stan Shih married Carolyn Yeh (Yeh Chi Hua) on Teacher's Day, September 28, 1971. Stan and Carolyn met though a mutual classmate during Shih's junior year of college. The two went on to have three children together: two sons and a younger daughter, though Shih fondly refers to Acer as their fourth child. Shih's oldest son Maverick Shih took on his mother's job in 2015 and is currently president of Acer's Build Your Own Cloud (BYOC) and Cloud Computing division.

== Involvement in Acer ==
Originally named Multitech in 1976, Acer was founded by 32-year-old Stan Shih alongside five other coworkers and his wife, Carolyn Yeh. Under his leadership, Acer grew into a global powerhouse dominating computer hardware and electronics, reaching a valuation of $5.8 billion by 1996. Shih drew inspiration from companies like Sony for their creativity and Philips for their journey from a small country to international success. Multitech began distributing electronic parts before shifting into the personal computer market, releasing three Micro-Professor (MPF) personal computers that resembled existing Apple products (two of them MPF-II and MPF-III, were considered Apple clones). Design-wise, Shih’s initial products were structurally similar to a PC, anticipating the company’s later shift toward the personal computer market.

Unlike the traditional Chinese model of family-owned businesses, Shih emphasized a decentralized approach within Acer. In 1992, he introduced the “fast-food model,” where Acer branches would assemble Taiwanese products locally. Additionally, he implemented a “client-server” structure, granting subsidiaries autonomy. These subsidiaries had their own stakeholders—often with local management as the majority—and made independent decisions, while Acer’s headquarters in Taiwan functioned as the "server," providing an overarching strategy. In action, these strategies made for a strong distributive network that brought down production costs, resulting in the lower pricing of Acer's PCs compared to Apple's products.

Shih retired from Acer in 2004 and subsequently founded iD SoftCapital Group, a consulting firm that provides fund and venture capital management to other companies in Taiwan, China, and the United States. In an interview, Shih expressed he's been planning this retirement (i.e. retiring at 60) for nearly ten years. However, Shih returned to Acer to lead its restructuring efforts following a disappointing quarterly performance in November 2013, during which he proposed reducing the workforce by 7 percent to mitigate losses. He officially retired for a second time in June 2014.

Shih remained active in charity work during his retirement, including serving as Taiwan's Special Envoy in the APEC Australia 2007. In November 2013, Shih returned to Acer after being reinstated as president and chairman.

Currently, he serves on the boards of Acer Inc., Taiwan Semiconductor Manufacturing Co., Nan Shan Life Insurance Co., Ltd., Taiwan Public Television Service Foundation and Chinese Television System. He is the chairman of Cloud Gate Culture and Arts Foundation, the head of Taiwan Connection Fun Club, One Song Orchestra Fun Club, the convener of the Cultural Tech Alliance, Taiwan and the chairman of CT Ambi Investment and Consulting Inc.
