= E110 =

E110 may refer to:

- Darmstadtium, element 110 in the periodic table
- Sunset yellow FCF, a food colourant with E number E110
- Embraer EMB 110 Bandeirante, a twin-turboprop light aircraft
- A medical form for international road hauliers, replaced by the European Health Insurance Card
- E110 Out-of-town travel, a Uniform Task-Based Management System expense code
- A form of Zircaloy, a corrosion-resistant Russian Zirconium-Niobium alloy used in nuclear reactors
- Toyota Corolla (E110), the eight generation in a line of Japanese compact cars, manufactured from 1995 to 2002
- Acer beTouch E110, a smartphone
