= Jason Chen (businessman) =

Taiwanese businessman

- 陳俊聖
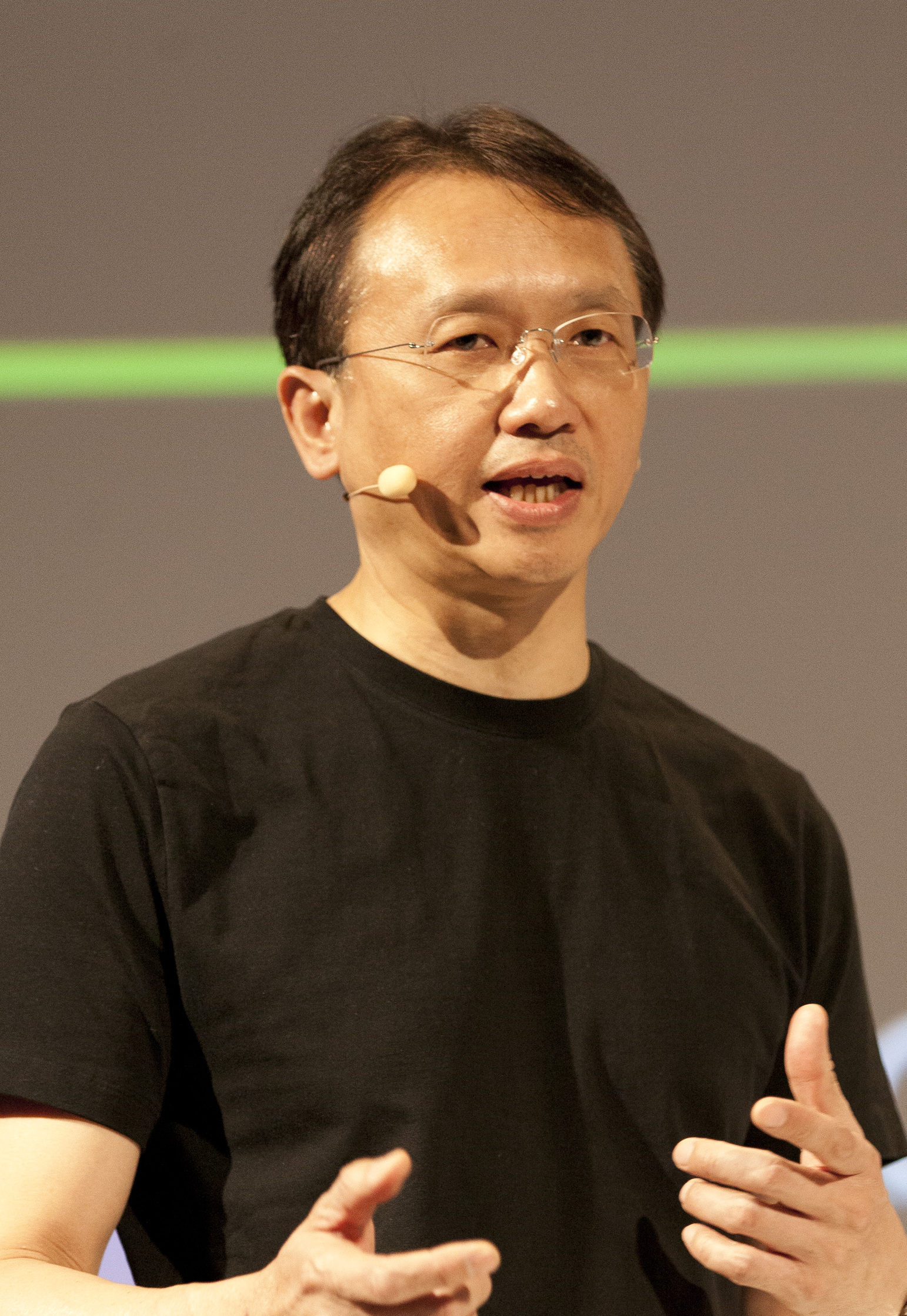
- Chen in 2016
- Born: 1961 (age 64–65)
- Education: National Cheng Kung University (BS); University of Missouri (MBA)
- Title: Senior Vice-President, TSMC; Chairman and CEO of Acer Inc.

Chinese name
- Traditional Chinese: 陳俊聖
- Simplified Chinese: 陈俊圣
Transcriptions
Standard Mandarin
- Hanyu Pinyin: Chén Jùnshèng

Chen Chun-shen (Chinese: 陳俊聖; pinyin: Chén Jùnshèng; born 1961), also known in English as Jason Chen, is a Taiwanese businessman who is the current chairman and chief executive officer (CEO) of the Taiwanese electronics company Acer Inc.

== Education ==
Chen graduated from National Cheng Kung University with a Bachelor of Science (B.S.) in management science in 1984. He then earned a Master of Business Administration (M.B.A.) from the University of Missouri in 1988.

== Business career ==
=== At Intel ===
Before joining TSMC, Chen worked for 14 years at Intel, holding a variety of sales and marketing positions. He started his tenure at Intel as a sales executive in Taiwan and later as regional sales manager for Greater China based in Singapore and Hong Kong. Chen then progressed to become vice president and general manager of the Asia Pacific region before his last assignment as the corporate vice president of international sales and marketing at Intel's headquarters in Santa Clara, California.

=== At TSMC ===
Prior to joining Acer, Chen served as senior vice president of worldwide sales and marketing at TSMC under its founder Morris Chang for a decade. Chen is a major departure from previous Acer CEOs in that he hails from a sales and marketing business background as opposed to an electrical engineering one.

=== At Acer ===
Acer appointed Jason Chen as its corporate president and CEO from January 1, 2014.

In June 2014, Acer Chief Executive Jason Chen said in an interview at the company's Taipei headquarters Thursday, "We have to expand our product offering from PC to other faster-growing segments, especially smartphones and tablets," "If you look at the top 20 most valuable enterprises in the world, none of them are pure hardware companies."

In 2015, Jason Chen, CEO of Acer Corp, told an international group of reporters. He said:“There are only four or five players in the PC industry, and all of us are survivors,” “We will be the last man standing for the PC industry.”

In June 2017, Acer Co-founder Stan Shih said the company's current CEO Jason Chen is the best candidate to take over as chairman. At that month, Acer CEO Jason Chen to become chairman of Acer.

In Feb. 2018, Acer CEO Jason Chen says gaming and esports will buttress the company's turnaround effort.
