= E400 =

E400 may refer to:

- Alginic acid
- Alexander Dennis Enviro400, a twin-axle, low-floor double-decker bus
- Eclipse 400, a light jet aircraft
- Acer beTouch E400, a smartphone
- Mercedes-Benz E400 Hybrid, an automobile
- One of the locomotives of Taiwan Railways Administration
- GV-E400 series, a DEMU train type on order by JR East in Japan
