= List of smartphones =

List of smartphones may refer to:

- List of Android smartphones
- Acer smartphones
- Comparison of Google Nexus smartphones
- Comparison of Google Pixel smartphones
- Comparison of Samsung Galaxy S smartphones
