= Acer Chromebook Tab 10 =

2018 launched Acer tablet computer

- Manufacturer: Acer Inc.
- Type: Tablet computer
- Introductory price: $329
- Operating system: ChromeOS
- System on a chip: Rockchip RK3399
- Memory: 4GiB
- Storage: 32GiB eMMC
- Connectivity: 802.11ac Wi-Fi and Bluetooth 4.1

The Acer Chromebook Tab 10 (D651N) is a tablet computer manufactured by Acer Inc. It is the first ChromeOS tablet that was released and received software updates until 2023. The tablet was announced in March 2018.

== Specifications ==
The SoC is a Rockchip OP1. It has 4GiB RAM and 32GiB of storage, which can be extended with a MicroSD card. It has a 9.7" inch display with a resolution of 2048×1536, with a dpi of 264. The code name of the device is scarlet.

It is primarily designed for education.

== Reception ==
TechRadar noted the excellent screen. PCMag noted that ChromeOS without a keyboard poses some problems.
