= Microprofessor III =

Apple IIe clone introduced in 1983 by Multitech

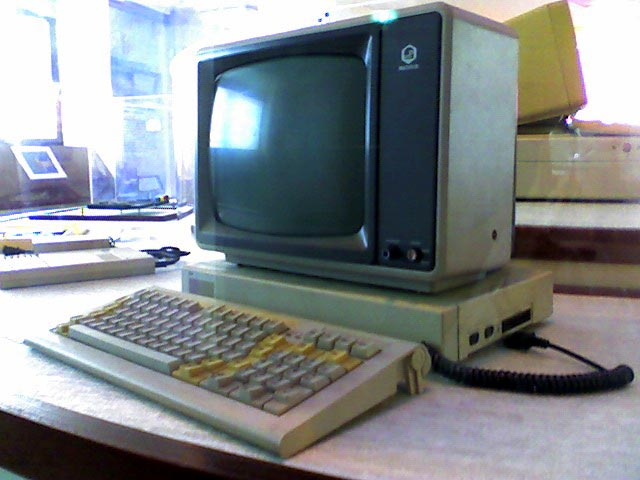
- Also known as: MPF III, Latindata MPF-III
- Manufacturer: Multitech
- Type: Personal computer
- Released: 1983; 43 years ago
- Operating system: Apple DOS 3.3, ProDOS, MPF-III BASIC
- CPU: MOS Technology 6502 @ 1 MHz
- Memory: 64KB dynamic, 2KB static
- Removable storage: Floppy Disks
- Display: Composite and RF modulator TV out; 40×24 or 80x24 text; 40×48 in 16 color, 280×192 in 6 color graphics
- Sound: One channel
- Backward compatibility: Apple IIe

Microprofessor III (MPF III), introduced in 1983, was Multitech's (later renamed Acer) third branded computer product and also (arguably) one of the first Apple IIe clones. Unlike the two earlier computers, its design was influenced by the IBM personal computer. Because of some additional functions in the ROM and different graphics routines, the MPF III was not totally compatible with the original Apple IIe computer.

One key feature of the MPF III in some models was its Chinese BASIC, a version of Chinese-localized BASIC based on Applesoft BASIC.

The MPF III included an optional Z80 CP/M emulator card. It permitted the computer to switch to the Z80 processor and run programs developed under the CP/M operating system.

In 1984 the machine had a retail price of $699 in Australia.

The different models in the MPF-III brand were the Multitech MPF-III/311 in NTSC countries (mainly in the United States and Canada) and the MPF-III/312 in PAL countries (mainly in Australia, Sweden, Spain, Finland, Italy and Singapore). It was also sold in Latin America as the Latindata MPF-III.

== Technical specifications ==
- CPU: MOS Technology 6502, 1 MHz
- Memory (RAM): 64KB dynamic RAM and 2KB static RAM
- ROM: 24KB, including MBASIC (MPF-III BASIC), monitor, sound, display and printer programs and drivers
- Operating system: DOS 3.3 or ProDOS
- Input/Output: NTSC composite video jack (MPF-III/311), TV RF modulator port, cassette port, printer port, joystick 9-pin D-type port, earphone, and external speaker jacks
- Expandability: internal slots (6), optional Z80 CP/M emulator card, one external Apple II type card slot
- Screen display:
  - Text modes: 40×24, 80x24 (with 80 columns card)
  - Graphics modes: 40×48 (16 col), 280×192 (6 col)
- Sound: one channel
- Storage: 2 optional 5.25 inch 140 KB diskette drives
- Keyboard: 90 keys keyboard with numeric keypad

== See also ==
- Microprofessor I — unrelated Z80 programming education device
- Microprofessor II
