= Acer Value Line =

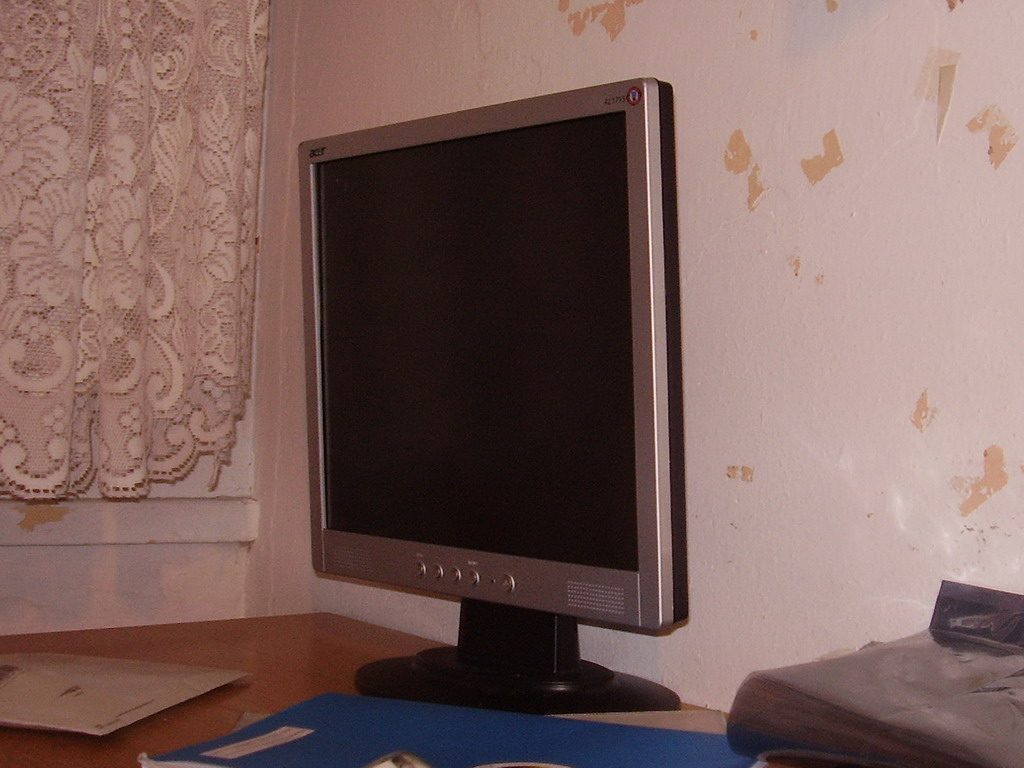
Acer AL1715 LCD Flat panel.

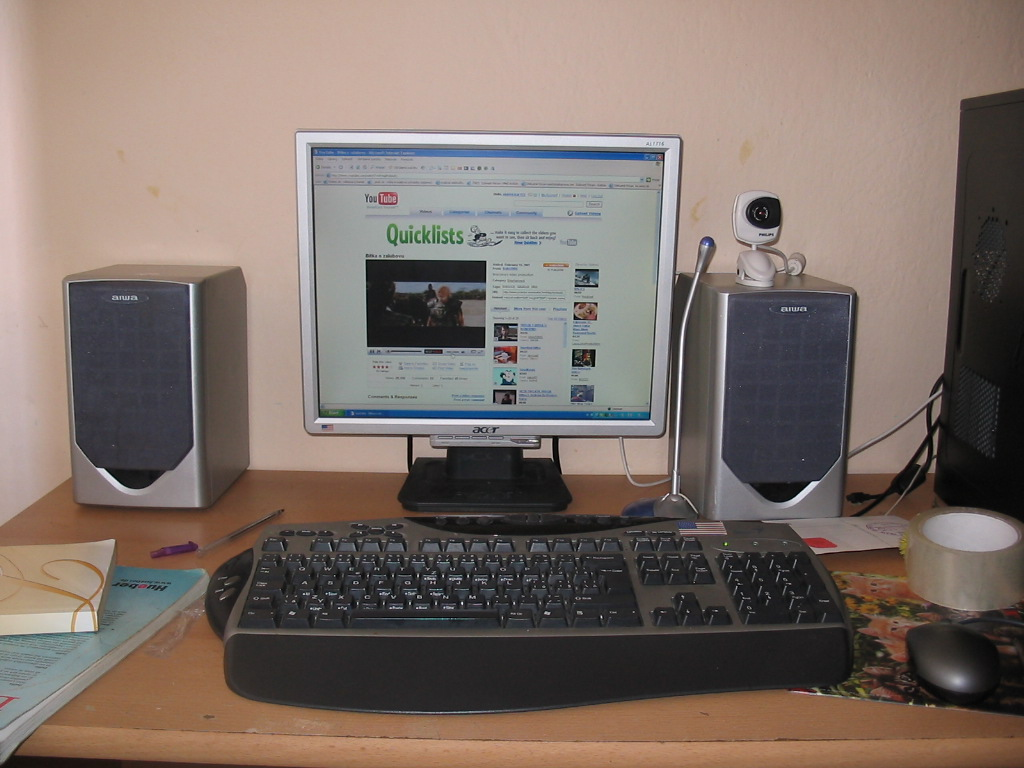
Acer AL1716 LCD Flat panel.

Acer Value Line is a product line of low-cost LCD monitors manufactured by Taiwan-based computer company Acer. Most of the liquid crystal display monitors from the Value Line series are dedicated to home or office users. Most of them have a classic design and standard functions ideal for home of office use. Value Line monitors were one of the most popular Acer products and they were available worldwide. At the end of 2008, Acer's Value line was discontinued.

== Technical overview ==
Monitors are marked "AL XX YY ZZ". This is acronym for Acer, LCD, screen size in inches, model number, additional info (widescreen, speakers, color of monitor's cover). For example AL1715SM or AL1916W. Than AL1916W monitor have 19 inch screen, it is the 16th acer model and it has a wide screen. The older models were marked "AL XXX"; it is the same marking, but only one number is used for parameter description. For market reasons Acer uses serial numbers in conformation "ET.LXXXX.XXX".

== Design ==
Monitors have a classic design, most of them have a white, black, or silver-black colored cover. Casing of monitors is thin with big screen and 5 buttons and LED indicator under the screen. 1st button is using for turn on/off monitor and last for Automatic configuration, other buttons are used for OSD menu control.
