= Micro-Professor MPF-I =

Microcomputer released by Multitech in 1981

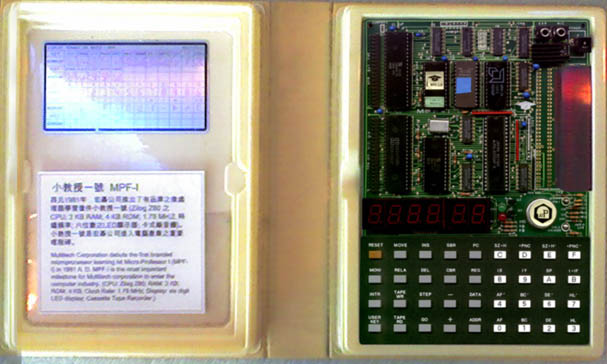
- Microprofessor I
- Also known as: MPF-1; MPF-1A; MPF-1B
- Developer: Multitech
- Manufacturer: Multitech (1981-1993); Flite Electronics International Limited (1993-)
- Released: 1981; 45 years ago
- Introductory price: $149
- Operating system: 2 KB monitor ROM
- CPU: Zilog Z80 @ 1.79 MHz
- Memory: 2 KB RAM
- Storage: Compact Cassette
- Display: Six digit 7-segment display.
- Sound: Beeper
- Input: Hexadecimal calculator-type keyboard (36 keys including, 16 hexadecimal keys, 19 function keys, and one user-definable key)
- Power: 5 V via 7805 from 9 V at 500 mA mains adapter
- Successor: MPF-1 Plus

The Micro-Professor MPF-I is a microcomputer developed by Multitech (later Acer) and released in 1981. It was the company's first branded product and served as a training system for learning machine code and assembly language for the Zilog Z80 microprocessor. After releasing several iterations of the product, Acer sold the product line to Flite Electronics in 1993.

== History ==
In 1981, Multitech released the Micro-Professor MPF-I, a Zilog Z80 microprocessor development board enclosed in a vacuum formed plastic bookcase for storage on a bookshelf. Later that year, Multitech introduced a Tiny-Basic for the MPF-I. They combined the Monitor and BASIC into a single 4 KB ROM, replacing the 2 KB monitor-only ROM. This configuration was marketed as the MPF-IB. As from this moment, the original Micro-Professor was marketed as MPF-IA.

In 1984, Multitech introduced the MPF-IP or MPF-Plus, a successor to the MPF-I with the same form factor. It featured a single line 20-digit, 14-segment fluorescent display and a click-type QWERTY keyboard. It had the same expansion connector as the MPF-I— a pin-header directly connected to the Z80 CPU—allowing several MPF-I expansion boards to be used on the MPF-IP. Compared to the MPF-1, it functioned more like a BASIC computer and included an assembler and disassembler in its 8 KB firmware. The MPF-IP featured 4 KB static RAM, with optional battery backup.

In 1985, Multitech released the MPF-I/88, the last product in the MPF-I line. It was an Intel 8088-based single board computer with a two-line LCD screen. Multitech was rebranded as Acer Inc. in 1987.

On 24 February 1993, Acer sold the Micro-Professor MPF-I product line to Flite Electronics International Limited, an international distributor for Acer based in Southampton, England. As of 2021, Flite continues manufacturing small batches of the MPF1B at a sub-contract manufacturing facility in Havant, England.

== Product specifications ==
Users enter programs on the MPF-I by typing Z80 instructions in machine code as hexadecimal numbers. The MPF-I monitor program displays both an address and data stored at that address simultaneously using a seven-segment display. There is a spare DIP socket for adding additional ROM or RAM to the MPF-I. There are also two 3.5 mm audio jacks on the top right of the computer; these are to communicate with the audio cassettes that are used to store programs and code typed into the machine. One is used to read the drive and the other is used to write data; on a conventional audio cassette deck the wires would be connected to the headphone and microphone ports. This data storage method is similar to the Radio Shack TRS-80 and Sinclair ZX-81, which also used audio cassettes to store both user-created and commercial programs.

== Modern extensions ==
PicoRAM 6116 is a 6116 SRAM emulator and SD card interface for the Microprofessor, built on the Raspberry Pi Pico. It allows storing and restoring complete SRAM memory dumps, and supports HEX files generated by Z80 assemblers—enabling a modern development workflow using PC-based assemblers and SD card file transfers.

== See also ==
- Microprofessor II — an unrelated Apple II clone made by Multitech
- Microprofessor III — an unrelated Apple IIe clone made by Multitech
