= Acer Veriton =

Series of desktop and nettop computer models

Acer Veriton series is a line of Acer PCs designed for business and professional users. The series includes several PCs with different sizes, shapes, performance and functionality. Veriton PCs come in various configurations, as well as dimensions, to cover the specific needs and demands: Micro-tower, Small Form Factor and Ultra Small Form Factor. All Acer Veriton desktop PCs labelled 'G' meet a variety of international standards for low energy consumption such as energy star 4.0, EPEAT Silver, RoHS and Green Seal.

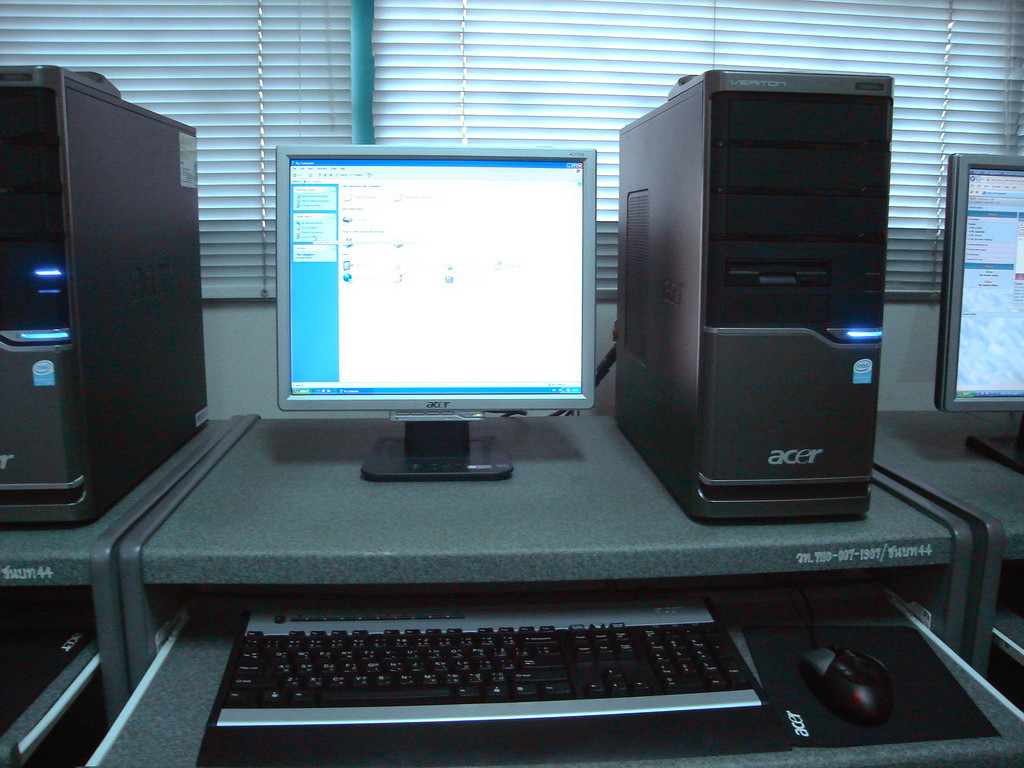
Acer Veriton found in Chiang Mai University

== Veriton N nettop models ==
Model	CPU			RAM	Chipset	Graphics	Ethernet	Wifi	Released
Model	Model	Cores	Frequency	RAM	Chipset	Graphics	Ethernet	Wifi	Released
N260G	Intel Atom N280	1	1.66 GHz	2 GB DDR2	Intel GN40	GMA 4500M	1x gigabit	None	Aug 18, 2009
N270G	Intel Atom D510	2	1.66 GHz	2 GB DDR2	Intel NM10	GMA 3150	1x gigabit	None	Unreleased (became N281G)
N281G	Intel Atom D425	1	1.8 GHz	2 GB DDR3	Intel NM10	GMA 3150	1x gigabit	802.11 b/g/n	Oct 6, 2010
N281G	Intel Atom D525	2	1.8 GHz	2 GB DDR3	Intel NM10	GMA 3150	1x gigabit	802.11 b/g/n	Oct 6, 2010
N282G	Intel Atom D425	1	1.8 GHz	2 GB DDR3	Intel NM10	Nvidia Ion	1x gigabit	802.11 b/g/n	Oct 6, 2010
N282G	Intel Atom D525	2	1.8 GHz	2 GB DDR3	Intel NM10	Nvidia Ion	1x gigabit	802.11 b/g/n	Oct 6, 2010

(Note: All using the same small form factor case as the Aspire Revo, but in a slightly different colour scheme. See Aspire Revo / Veriton and here)

== Veriton desktop models ==
All desktop models come with integrated graphics only.

Model	CPU	RAM	Chipset	Ethernet
M460	Intel Core 2	2GB DDR2	Intel 946GZ	1x Gigabit
M460	Intel Pentium	2GB DDR2	Intel 946GZ	1x Gigabit
M460	Intel Celeron	2GB DDR2	Intel 946GZ	1x Gigabit
VM2610	Intel Pentium	4GB DDR3	Intel H61	1x Gigabit
VM2610	Intel i3 (Sandy Bridge)	4GB DDR3	Intel H61	1x Gigabit
VM4618G	Intel i5 (Sandy Bridge)	4GB DDR3	Intel Q65	1x Gigabit
VM4618G	Intel i7 (Sandy Bridge)	4GB DDR3	Intel Q65	1x Gigabit

== Other Veriton desktop/nettop models ==
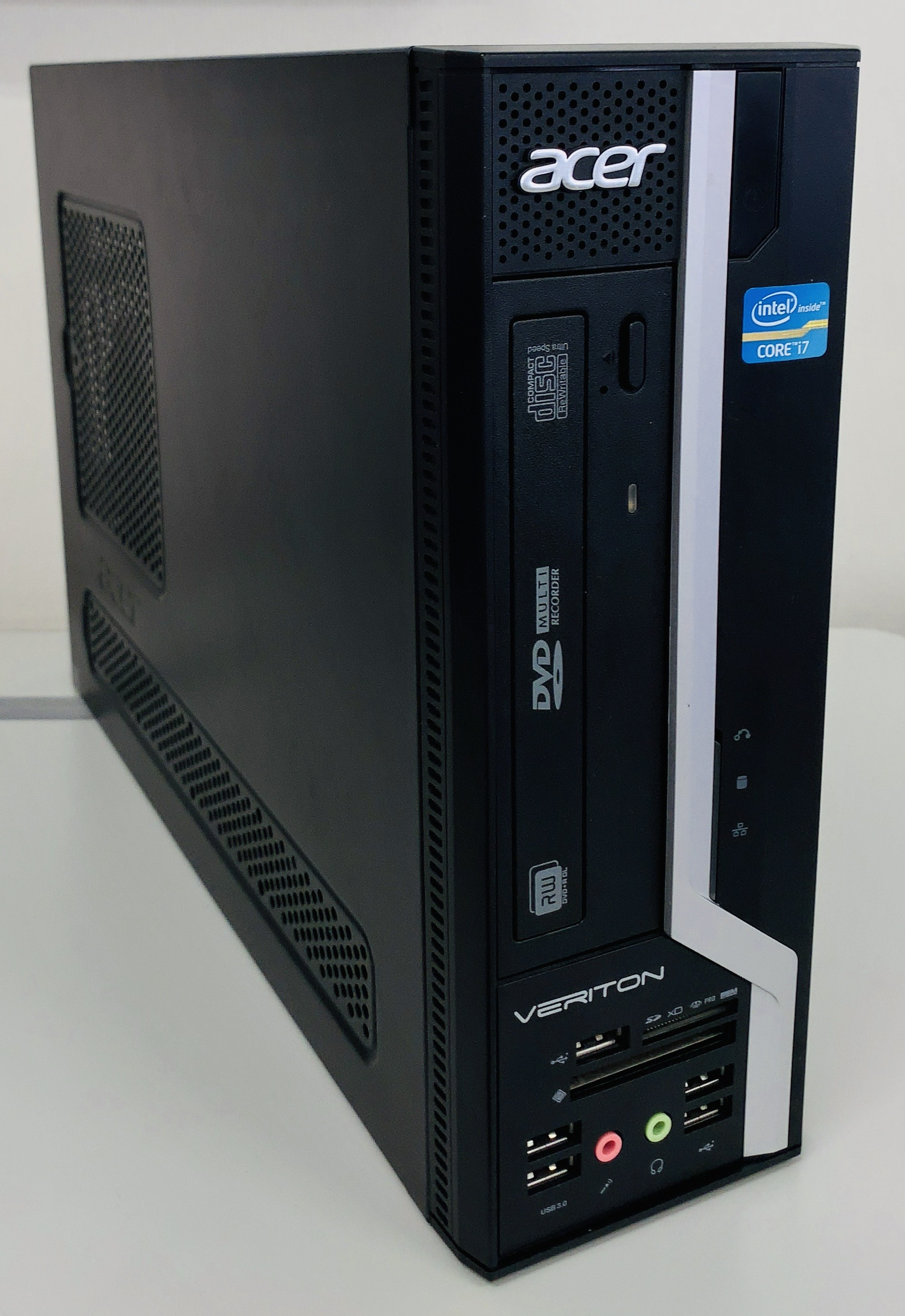
Acer Veriton X4620G

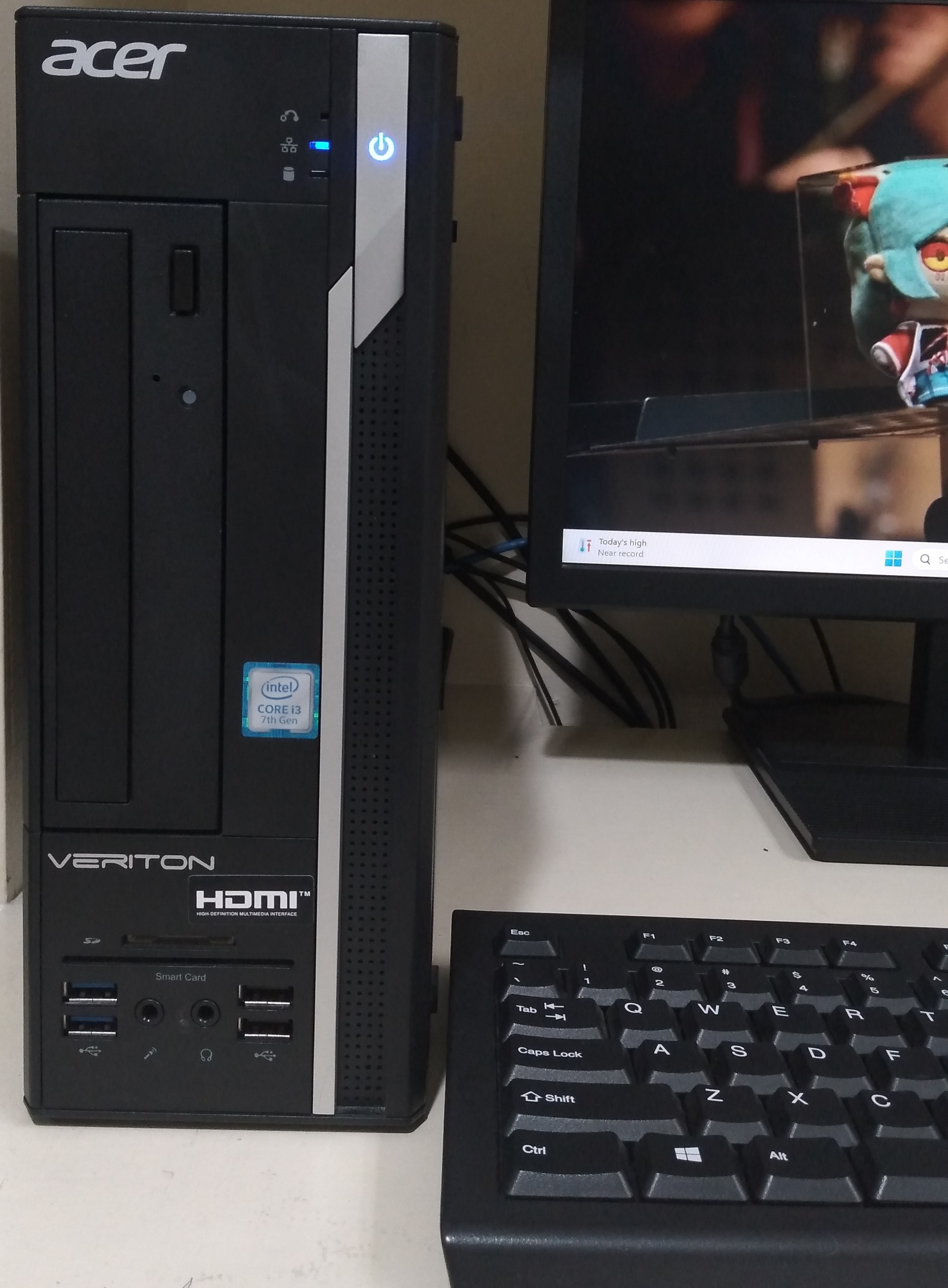
Acer Veriton X4650G

- Acer Veriton Z280G
- Acer Veriton Z410G
- Acer Veriton Z431G
- Acer Veriton M430G
- Acer Veriton M265
- Acer Veriton M275
- Acer Veriton X275
- Acer Veriton M4630G
- Acer Veriton M480G
- Acer Veriton X490G
- Acer Veriton M490G
- Acer Veriton L480G
- Acer Veriton L670G
- Acer Veriton S680G
- Acer Veriton M661
- Acer Veriton M665
- Acer Veriton M6660G | Q370H5-M6
- Acer Veriton M680G
- Acer Veriton M670G
- Acer Veriton M68WS
- Acer Veriton M67WS
- Acer Veriton M421G
- Acer Veriton X480G
- Acer Veriton X4620G
- Acer Veriton X4650G
