= Dragon Computer & Communication =

Indonesian hardware distribution company

- Native name: Dragon
- Formerly: Batumas Computer Center (BCC)
- Type: PT (Privately Owned)
- Industry: Computer Hardware Distribution
- Founded: 1980; 46 years ago
- Founder: Fransiskus Eddy Liew
- Headquarters: Mangga Dua Square, Jakarta, Indonesia
- Area served: Indonesia
- Key people: Lydiawati Dakhi, CEO; Silverius Linus Kurniawan, COO; Ince Meliana, Director; Borton Liew, Director
- Products: Notebook, Netbook, Tablet, Personal Computer, Optical Drive, Mouse, Printer, Ink Cartridge, Toner, Wireless CCTV
- Brands: Elevo, ASUS, ACER, InkTec
- Services: Computer Hardware Distribution and Service
- Website: www.dragon.co.id

Dragon Computer & Communication, commonly known as Dragon in Indonesia, was the first and largest hardware distribution company in the country. The company is headquartered in Jakarta, Java, Indonesia.

The company offers a wide range of computer hardware brands, including but not limited to Acer, ASUS, Inktec, Elevo, Lite-On, and Edimax.

== History ==
=== Batumas Computer Center (BCC) ===
Dragon, formerly known as Batumas Computer Center (BCC), was founded by Fransiskus Eddy Liew in 1980. Before establishing the company, Liew—a Malaysian national at the time—was well known as an importer of various brands, including Olivetti typewriters, Citizen calculators, and Casio digital watches, since 1973.

Eddy Liew is well known among his peers and family as an entrepreneur from the golden era of calculator and digital watch sales. He later shifted his business focus to the distribution and sale of personal computers, which was considered a novel venture with uncertain prospects at the time.

His decision proved to be quite accurate, as BCC—at the time selling Sinclair, the first computer brand in Indonesia—experienced significant success. Other brands distributed by BCC in the 1980s included Commodore, IBM, KT Technology, and Twinhead. BCC was also known as Acer Software before Acer became recognized for computer hardware and peripheral manufacturing.

=== Rebrand to 'Dragon Computer & Communication' ===
Eddy Liew's second son was born in 1988, the Year of the Dragon. In response, BCC changed its name to Dragon Computer. Additionally, Liew recognized that computer hardware and telecommunications hardware would increasingly be used together and therefore should not be separated, leading to the addition of the word "Communication" to "Dragon Computer," forming "Dragon Computer & Communication."

In 1998, the company’s small shop in Glodok, Jakarta, was targeted during a local riot and was subsequently looted and burned down. Despite this setback, it became a catalyst for the company’s growth and led to its relocation to the aptly named "The Dragon" headquarters in Mangga Dua Square, Jakarta.

Dragon is also a founding member and key supporter of the Association of Indonesian Computer Entrepreneurs (APKOMINDO) and the Indonesian Information and Technology Association (AITI).

=== Distributed brands ===
Dragon is recognized as a main distributor of Acer and ASUS in Indonesia. Under Dragon’s leadership, Acer became the #1 brand in Indonesia for nine consecutive years, from 2005 to 2013, according to IDC and GfK.

In 2014, ASUS appointed Dragon as one of its distributors, and in the same year, ASUS became the #1 brand in Indonesia, according to IDC and GfK.

In the early era of Dragon, under Eddy Liew's leadership, the company developed several well-known brands in the Indonesian market, including BENQ, Compaq, IBM Aptiva, Packard Bell, Gateway, E-Machine by Acer, Epson printers, and Inktec.

Dragon also contributed to the success of the Lite-On brand and BTC (a Taiwanese brand) in Indonesia during 2003. Lite-On became the leading brand of optical drives in the Indonesian market for eight years, from 2003 to 2010.

=== Elevo ===
In 2008, Dragon's subsidiary company, PT Elevo Technologies Indonesia, formed a partnership with Maarash Technology China (a computer distributor and manufacturer of the Compal brand) to create a notebook and netbook specifically designed for the Indonesian market. The brand quickly gained a reputation as Indonesia's own brand, offering an affordable price of under 1 million Rupiah (Rp 999,000.00). In its early years, Elevo attracted significant attention from Indonesian customers; however, since the product was not officially backed by the Indonesian government, Elevo struggled to compete effectively with well-known global brands.

=== Dragon Capital Center ===
In early 2015, Dragon bootstrapped a startup company under the name PT Dragon Capital Center. The project, which was still in stealth mode, was set to be launched in 2016.

=== Dragon's Product Roadmap ===
No	Brand	Origin	Products	Announced	Status
1	Casio	Japan	Calculator, Casio Tone, Digital Watch	1980	Sole Distributor
2	Sinclair	England	PC	1981	Sole Agent
3	Citizen	Japan	Calculator	1986	Sole Agent
4	KT Tech	Korea	PC	1989	Distributor
5	Acer	Taiwan	PC	1991	Master Dealer
6	Epson	Japan	Printer, INK	1991	Master Dealer
7	IBM	USA	PC Aptiva	1996	Distributor
8	Acer	Taiwan	PC, Notebook	1998	Sole Distributor
9	Inktec	Korea	Ink, Toner, Cartridge, Paper	1999	Sole Distributor
10	LITE-ON	Taiwan	Compact Disc, Optical Drive	2001	Sole Distributor
11	BTC	Taiwan	Optical Drive	2006	Sole Distributor
12	Asus	Taiwan	Notebook	2014	Distributor
13	Elevo	Indonesia	Notebook, Netbook	2008	Manufacturer

== Subsidiaries ==
1. PT Dragon Capital Center (Internet Product and Service Company)
2. PT Dharma Inti Teknologi (Computer Hardware Distributor)
3. PT Dharma Citra Cendekia (Computer Hardware Distributor)
4. PT Sinar Mitra Cendekia (Printer Ink and CCTV Distributor)
5. PT Elevo Technologies (Computer Importer)
