= Acer Liquid A1 =

Smartphone manufactured by Acer Inc.

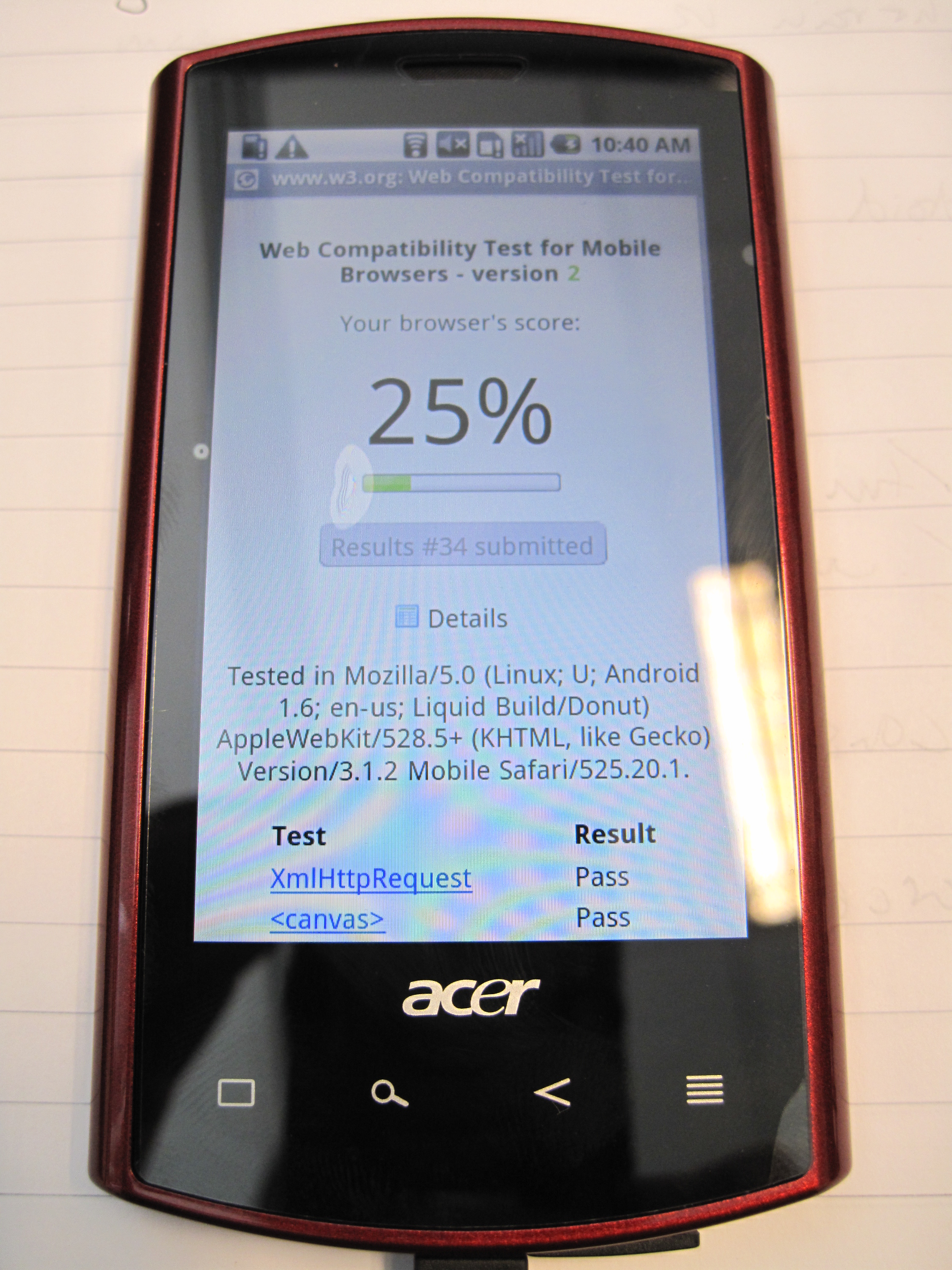
- Manufacturer: Acer Inc.
- Availability by region: December 2009 (UK)
- Successor: Acer Liquid E
- Dimensions: 62.5×115×12.5 mm (2.46×4.53×0.49 in)
- Weight: 135 g (5 oz) (battery included)
- Operating system: Android 1.6 "Donut" (Upgradeable to Android 2.1 "Eclair")
- CPU: Qualcomm QSD 8250 (Snapdragon), 768 MHz
- Removable storage: microSD, microSDHC, TransFlash, SDIO
- Battery: Li-Po 1350 mAh
- Rear camera: 5 MP, 2560х1920 pixels, autofocus
- Display: 3.5" TFT LCD, capacitive touchscreen; 480x800 pixels
- Connectivity: Bluetooth 2.0 + EDR; Wi-Fi 802.11g, GPS with A-GPS
- Other: Google turn-by-turn navigation

The Acer Liquid A1 (S100) is a smartphone manufactured by Acer Inc. of Taiwan. It was launched on 7 December 2009 in the UK. The phone is Acer's first to use the Android operating system, backed by Google. It is also the world's first Android phone to use a Snapdragon processor.

== Specifications ==
=== Hardware ===
The Acer Liquid A1 has a 3.5-inch TFT capacitive touchscreen display, 768 MHz Qualcomm Scorpion Snapdragon S1 processor, 256 MB of RAM and 512 MB of internal storage that can be expanded using microSD cards up to 32 GB. The phone has a 1350 mAh Li-ion battery, 5 MP rear camera with no selfie camera. It is available in black, white, red colors.

=== Software ===
Acer announced their intention to release an update for the Acer Liquid in the first half of 2010 that would upgrade the Android OS 1.6 version to version 2.1 (Eclair). The update finally came in July 2010.

== See also ==
- Acer Liquid E
- Acer Liquid Metal
- Galaxy Nexus
- List of Android devices
