= Acer Liquid E =

Smartphone manufactured by Acer Inc.

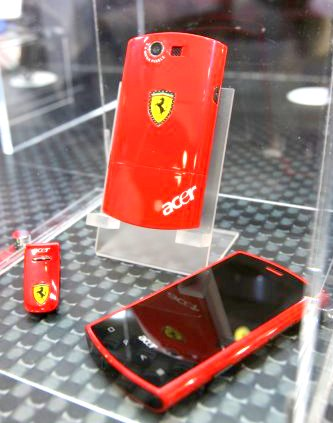
- Manufacturer: Acer Inc.
- Availability by region: August 2010 (UK)
- Predecessor: Acer Liquid A1
- Successor: Acer Liquid Metal
- Dimensions: 62.5 x 115 x 12.5 millimetres
- Weight: 135 g (5 oz) (battery included)
- Operating system: Android 2.1 "Éclair". (Upgradeable to Android 2.2 "Froyo")
- CPU: Qualcomm QSD 8250 (Snapdragon), 768 MHz
- Removable storage: microSD, up to 32GB
- Battery: Li-Po 1350 mAh
- Rear camera: 5 MP, 2560х1920 pixels, autofocus
- Display: 3.5" TFT LCD, capacitive touchscreen; 480x800 pixels
- Connectivity: Bluetooth 2.0 + EDR; Wi-Fi 802.11g, GPS with A-GPS
- Other: Google turn-by-turn navigation

The Acer Liquid E is a touchscreen smartphone developed and marketed by Acer Inc. It is the second handset designed by Acer that uses Android 2.1 (Eclair). It was introduced in February, 2010 succeeding the Acer Liquid A1.

== Features ==
The difference between the Acer Liquid E and the Acer Liquid A1 is the quantity of RAM - the Acer Liquid E has 512 MB, twice that of the Acer Liquid at 256 MB. Also it was shipped by default with Android 2.1 instead of Android 1.6.

=== Size and weight ===
The Liquid E measures 115 mm × 64 mm × 12.75 mm and weights 135 g.

=== Display ===
The display of this smartphone was TFT LCD screen capable of displaying 256k colors with a diagonal size of 3.5 in (8.9 cm) and with a capacitive touchscreen. The LCD was capable of displaying 800 by 480 pixels (WVGA) giving a pixel density of ~267 ppi.

=== Camera ===
The camera featured in the phone may take pictures up to 5 megapixels with autofocus and record videos at a resolution of 640 by 480 pixels (VGA).

=== Operating system ===
The operating system pre-installed in the units shipped was the Android 2.1. In February, 2011, Acer announced the official 2.2 upgrade for Acer Liquid E and Acer Liquid E Ferrari Edition with the new Acer-made Breeze UI. For those who prefer the stock Android UI, it is possible to change this in the phone settings.

=== Processor and memory ===
The processor installed was a Qualcomm 8250 clocked at 768 MHz.

It has 512 MB of RAM, twice the amount of the Liquid A1.

=== Storage ===
The 512 MB of internal flash memory is mostly designated to be used by the phone's own system. The phone has a microSD expansion port that allows users to install a microSD card of up to 32 GB. Normally the Liquid E was shipped with a 2 GB microSD card.

=== Connectivity ===
The 3G modem is capable of connecting to HSDPA networks in the 900 MHz, 1900 MHz and 2100 MHz bands. In addition, it has also WiFi 802.11 b/g and Bluetooth class 2.0 connectivity. There is also a GPS receiver built-in. There is also available a Mini-USB port to allow file-transfer to and from a computer and also debugging, a 3.5 mm stereo audio jack and a built-in audio speaker (in addition to the ones to be used to make phone calls).

=== Battery ===
The Liquid E is powered by a lithium-ion 1350 mAh battery that lasts up to 400 hours in stand-by or 5 hours of talk time.

== See also ==
- Acer Liquid A1
- Acer Liquid E2, using a MediaTek MT6589 SoC.
- Acer Liquid Metal
- Galaxy Nexus
- List of Android devices
