= Chinese BASIC =

Chinese-localized versions of the BASIC programming language

Chinese BASIC (Chinese: 中文培基; pinyin: Zhōngwén Péijī) is the name given to several Chinese-localized versions of the BASIC programming language in the early 1980s.

== Versions ==
At least two versions of Chinese BASIC were modified Applesoft BASIC that accepted Chinese commands and variables. They were built into some Taiwan-made Apple II clones. One of these was shipped with the best-selling Multitech Microprofessor II. Another version was shipped with MiTAC's Little Intelligent Computer (小神通).

Multitech also developed a Zilog Z80-based port of the Chinese BASIC for its own line of high-end computers.

== Example ==
In a typical Chinese BASIC environment, Chinese and English commands are interchangeable. It may also accept Chinese and Latin alphabet variables. For example, you may use PRINT A in line 50, 印 A in line 200 and ? A in line 250. They all do the same thing—to print out the value of A on screen.

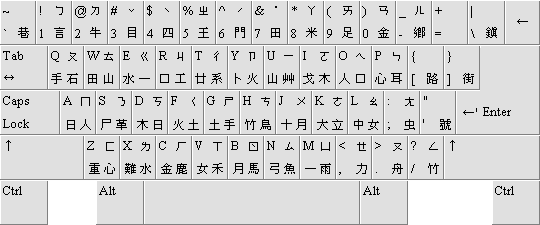
Chinese (traditional) keyboard layout

Chinese BASIC commands are printed in blue	Applesoft BASIC
10 卜=0	10 Y=0
20 入 水, 火	20 INPUT E, F
30 從 日 = 水 到 火	30 FOR A = E TO F
40 卜 = 卜+對數(日)	40 Y = Y + LOG (A)
50 下一 日	50 NEXT A
60 印 卜	60 PRINT Y

This program calculates the sum of log (E) + log (E+1) + log (E+2) + ... + log (F). The Chinese characters used as variables are the 24 radicals of the Cangjie method, one of the earliest QWERTY keyboard-compatible Chinese input methods.

The significant length of an Applesoft BASIC variable name is restricted to two bytes. Therefore, the variables THISNUMBER and THATNUMBER are treated as the same. In Multitech's Chinese BASIC, a variable can be 3 bytes long (one Chinese character + one numeral).

== See also ==
- Non-English-based programming languages
