= Acer beTouch E400 =

Smartphone manufactured by Acer Inc.

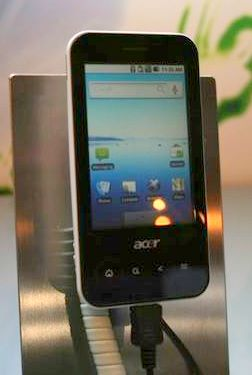
- Manufacturer: Acer Inc.
- Availability by region: April 2010
- Dimensions: 115×59.3×12 mm (4.53×2.33×0.47 in)
- Weight: 125 g (4 oz)
- Operating system: Android 2.1
- CPU: Qualcomm 7227 600 MHz processor
- Battery: Li-Po 1090 mAh
- Rear camera: 3.2 MP camera with geo-tagging
- Display: 3.2-inch HVGA touchscreen display
- Other: nemoPlayer, social networking integration

The Acer beTouch E400 is a smartphone manufactured by Acer Inc. of Taiwan. With this smartphone the company opted to go Android 2.1 (Éclair) and abandon the Windows Mobile 6.5 used in the first beTouch smartphones released starting October 2009. The Acer beTouch E400 was officially announced at the Mobile World Congress in February 2010.

== Main features ==
The E400 is powered by the 600 MHz Qualcomm QSX 7227 CPU and runs Android 2.1 Eclair. It has an 81mm (3.2-inch) touchscreen, a camera without flash, Wi-Fi, geo-tagging, digital zoom, scene modes, white balance, color effects and a simple macro mode. This phone is also able to record video and upload it to YouTube. It supports Native Microsoft Exchange Server and a shareware "Documents To Go" application that can edit and create Microsoft Word documents, Excel and PowerPoint and Adobe PDF.

The beTouch E400 comes preinstalled with Acer Sync, an application that allows automatic cloud-based and Wi-Fi synchronization with netbook, notebook or desktop.

== See also ==
- List of Android devices
- Galaxy Nexus
