= GrandPad =

American technology company

- Company type: Private
- Industry: Technology
- Founded: 2014
- Founders: Scott Lien (CEO); Isaac Lien
- Headquarters: Minneapolis, Minnesota, California, United States
- Areas served: United States; Europe
- Products: Tablet computer for the elderly
- Website: www.grandpad.net

GrandPad is an American technology company based in Minneapolis, Minnesota. that produces a touch-screen tablet computer intended to be used by senior citizens. The device's interface is designed to be more user-friendly than traditional mobile tablets. It allows users to engage in video chats, view pictures, check news, and send messages (among other features).

== History ==
GrandPad was founded in 2014 by Scott Lien, a former Intuit executive, and his son, Isaac Lien. The elder Lien serves as the company's CEO. It is headquartered in Minneapolis, Minnesota where many of the technological aspects of the business are housed. The first GrandPad tablet was launched in January 2015.

In March 2016, GrandPad entered into a strategic partnership with technology and hardware company, Acer, which saw the latter company make an equity investment in GrandPad. Later that year, GrandPad partnered with Comfort Keepers (a firm offering in-home care to seniors) to provide their tablets to seniors in the Comfort Keepers network. In 2017, an updated version of the tablet was released with input from Acer. Also that year, the company collaborated with Lyft to integrate the ride-hailing service's app into the GrandPad interface.

In May 2018, it was announced that senior citizen-focused wireless network company, Consumer Cellular, invested in GrandPad. Consumer Cellular also announced that it would become a distributor of the GrandPad tablet in the United States. In March 2019, GrandPad opened its first European office in Gorey, Ireland, which was established to support its European operations. The company also began selling its tablet through Amazon and Walgreens in 2022.

== Product ==
The tablet is 8-inches and weighs 12.5-ounces. It has a Qualcomm Snapdragon 625 processor with 2GB of RAM and uses the Android operating system but with a specialized interface. It comes with a Qi wireless charging dock and has 4G LTE internet access is built in. Contacts and photo albums are managed remotely, typically by a relative. Only approved users can send e-mail messages or video chat requests through a companion GrandPad app on their phones. Games, articles, and music are tailored to the interests of the tablet user. No Wi-Fi, home phone lines, or passwords are required. The technology is supported by a network of customer service agents who are on-call 24/7. Other features include games, an encyclopedia, news articles, weather reports, a flashlight, a magnifying glass, music, and Zoom integration. Its tablet and companion app also have language capabilities in 40 languages.
