= Toshiba TG01 =

Mobile phone model

- Manufacturer: Toshiba
- Availability by region: H2 2009
- Compatible networks: GSM 850/900/1800/1900, GPRS Class 12, EDGE, UMTS 2100, HSDPA 7.2 Mbit/s, HSUPA 2Mps
- Form factor: Slate smartphone
- Dimensions: 129×70×9.9 mm (5.08×2.76×0.39 in)
- Weight: 129 g (5 oz)
- Operating system: Windows Mobile 6.5 (formerly 6.1)
- Memory: 256 MB of RAM, 512 MB of ROM
- Removable storage: MicroSD (up to 32 GB)
- Battery: Li-ion 1000mAh
- Rear camera: 3.2 megapixel
- Display: 4.1"
- Connectivity: Wi-Fi, GPS, A-GPS
- Data inputs: Touchscreen

The Toshiba TG01 is a large touchscreen phone/Mobile Internet Device. It is based on the Windows Mobile operating system and uses Qualcomm Snapdragon chip architecture (QSD8250), rated at 1 GHz. Connectivity-wise, it is a quad-band GSM phone with support for 2100 MHz UMTS with HSDPA download speeds of up to 7.2 Mbit/s and HSUPA upload speeds of up to 2 Mbit/s. It is Wi-Fi capable, GPS-enabled with support for A-GPS, and comes with Bluetooth 2.0, microSD expandable memory (up to 32 GB) and a micro USB connector.

Physically the device is notable for its size and thinness. Available in both black and white colours, it has a Magnesium alloy casing, while its main feature is a 4.1-inch 480 x 800 pixel touchscreen. It only has two buttons, at the bottom of the screen. These are surface click buttons used for Home and Back functions. Other features include a rear-mounted 3.2MP autofocus camera.

Another feature of the TG01 is its G-Sensor, which Toshiba claims enables gesture operations, such as shaking the TG01 to take a call or tilting it to switch between applications. It also has a custom user interface, which visually is demonstrated by three vertical stripes. Software features include the Internet Explorer Mobile 6 web browser, multimedia player, push email, and support for DivX and Flash for media playback.

The first operator to announce deployment of the TG01 is O2 Germany. It was thought that the device will be exclusively available through O2 throughout Europe, but this has transpired to not be true. The second one is NTT docomo, which is the Japanese largest operator. The TG-01 for NTT docomo is named as "docomo PRO series T-01A." In June or July 2009, it will be sold. In the UK the device is ranged by Orange.

In late July 2009, the Federal Communications Commission of the United States passed the CDMA version of the TG01 for inspection, thus allowing the device to be sold in the United States.
