= Microprofessor II =

Apple II clone introduced in 1982 by Multitech

Micro-Professor II
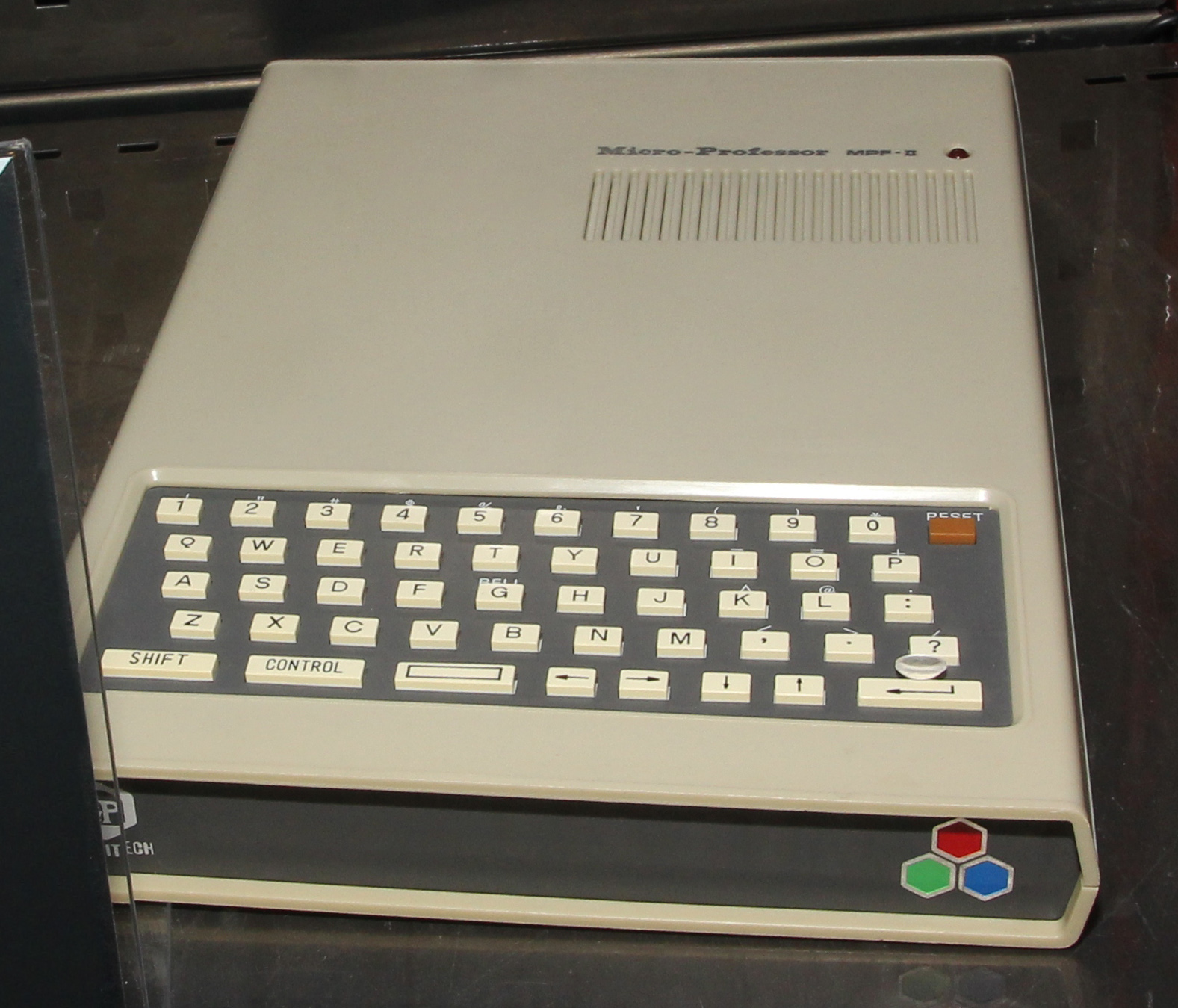
- Also known as: MPF-II
- Manufacturer: Multitech
- Type: Personal computer
- Released: 1982; 44 years ago
- Operating system: Applesoft Basic compatible / Chinese BASIC
- CPU: MOS Technology 6502 @ 1 MHz
- Memory: 64KB
- Removable storage: Floppy Disks, Audio Cassette
- Display: Composite and RF modulator TV out; 40×24 text; 48x40 and 280×192 graphics; 6 colors
- Sound: Beeper
- Backward compatibility: Apple II

Micro-Professor II (MPF-II) is an Apple II clone introduced in 1982 by Multitech (later renamed to Acer). It is Multitech's second branded computer product and also one of the earliest Apple II clones. The MPF II doesn't look like most other computers, with its case being a slab with a small chiclet keyboard on the lower part.

In 1983, the Micro-Professor II had a retail price of £269.00 in the UK and 2995FF in France.

One key feature of the MPF-II was its Chinese BASIC, a version of Chinese-localized BASIC based and compatible with Applesoft BASIC. Versions of the machine sold in Europe, Northern America, India, Singapore, and Australia didn't have Chinese localization.

Peripherals for the machine included a two floppy disk drive controller and a thermal printer.

== Differences from Apple II ==
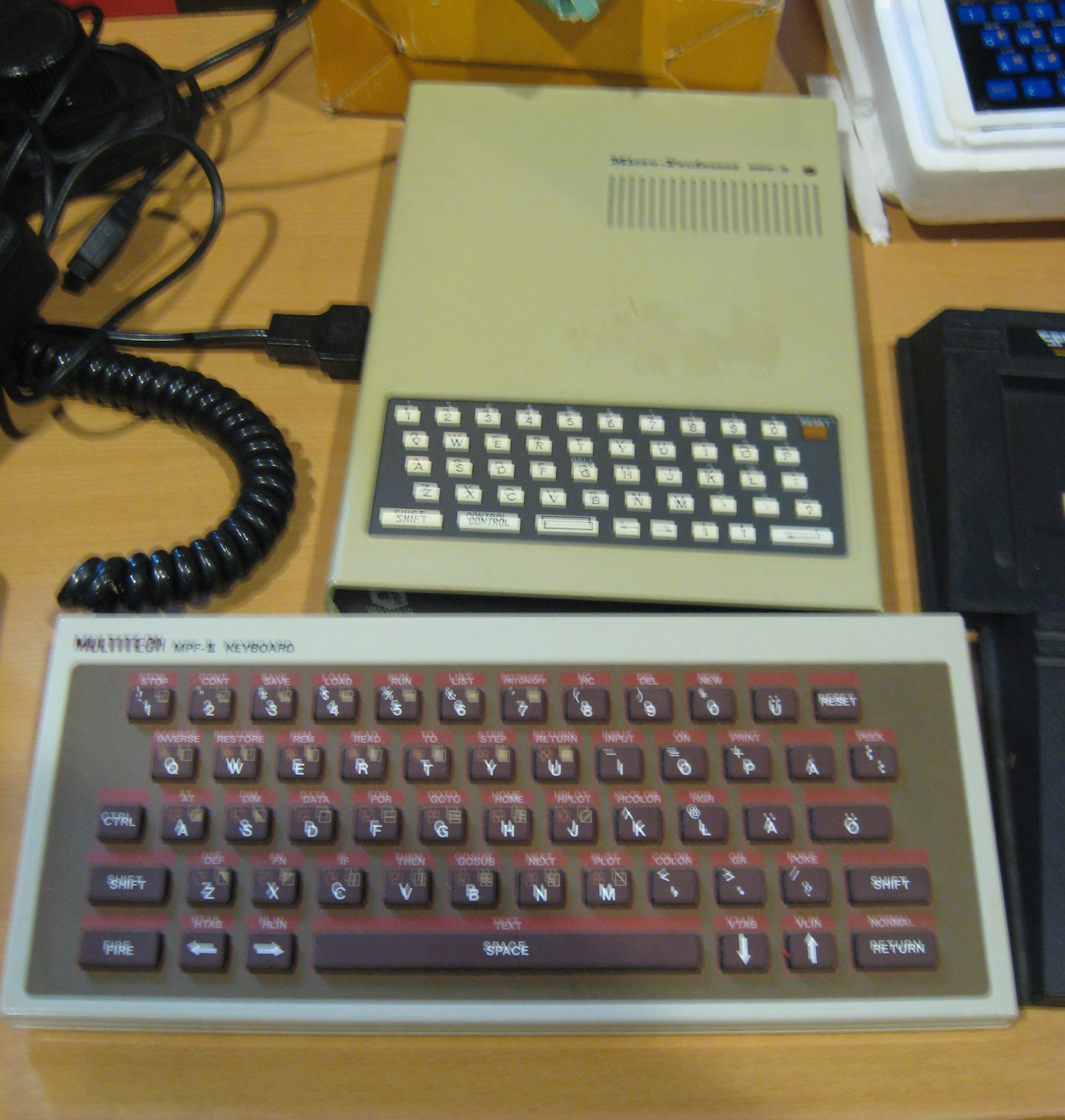
MPF II with add-on full-size keyboard attached

The MPF-II is not entirely compatible with the Apple II, not having its text mode. All the text was drawn on the screen by software rather than generated by hardware. It was the only cost-effective way to generate Chinese text on the screen at a time when a hardware-based Chinese character generator could cost hundreds of U.S. dollars.

The MPF-II second graphic buffer was at memory address A000H, while Apple II's was at 4000H. The keyboard input was also mapped to a different address, making it impossible to play Apple's games on the MPF II.

MPF-II keyboard interface was very simple and consisted of an 8-bit output port and an input port that was directly connected to the keyboard matrix. It also lacked the Apple joystick interface.

The external slot interface was also not compatible with the Apple II and the machine couldn't use any standard interface cards (like the Disk II controller).

== Technical information ==
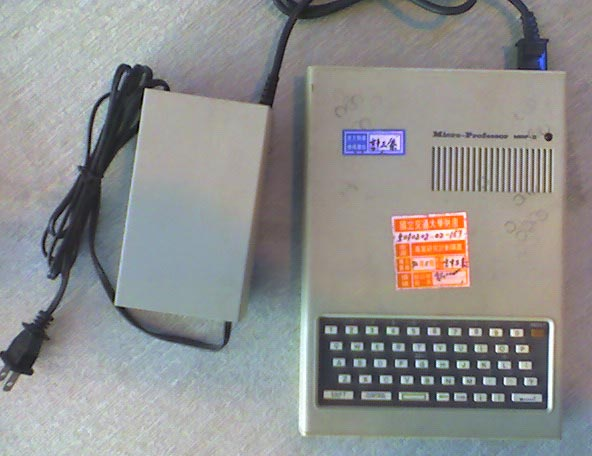

Micro-Professor II had the following specifications:

- CPU: MOS Technology 6502
- Clock rate: 1 MHz
- RAM: 64 KB (including 16KB RAM mapped at the same address as the ROM)
- ROM: 16 KB (12 KB of which is a BASIC interpreter)
- Text modes: 40 × 24 with 7 × 5 pixel normal or inverse characters
- Graphics modes: 48 × 40 or 280 × 192 in 6 colours (black, white, blue, orange, purple and yellow)
- Sound: 1 channel of 1-bit sound, internal beeper
- Connectors: keyboard, joystick, printer, cartridges, audio in and output for cassette recorder, composite video and RF modulator out
- Optional peripherals: 55 key full-size keyboard, floppy disc drive, thermal and dot-matrix printers, joystick
- Power supply: External PSU; 5 and 12V

== See also ==
- Micro-Professor I (Z80 programming education device introduced in 1981)
- Micro-Professor III (Apple IIe clone introduced in 1983)
- TK 2000 (Micro-Professor II clone by Microdigital Electrônica introduced in 1984)
