= Acer beTouch E110 =

Smartphone manufactured by Acer Inc.

Acer E110
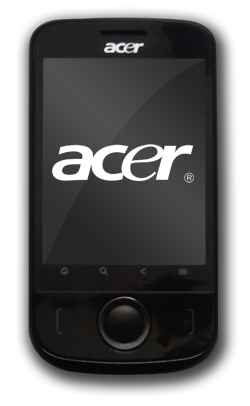
- Acer beTouch E110 Black
- Manufacturer: Acer
- Series: beTouch
- Form factor: Bar
- Weight: 105 g (4 oz)
- Operating system: Android 1.5 "Cupcake"
- Battery: 1500 mAh, chargeable through microUSB slot
- Rear camera: 3.2 megapixels
- Display: 71 mm QVGA touchscreen
- Connectivity: 3G, Bluetooth, GPS, USB 2.0
- Data inputs: Touchscreen, joystick

The Acer beTouch E110 is a smartphone manufactured by Acer Inc. of Taiwan. The phone is based on the Android 1.5 operating system. It is focused on social networking, with features for integrating with Facebook, Twitter and other social networks.

The beTouch E110 was released on February 15, 2010. The smartphone is marketed as a budget Android-powered device. It lacks Wi-Fi capability.

== Specifications ==
=== Hardware ===
The Acer beTouch E110 has a 2.8-inch TFT capacitive touchscreen display, ST-Ericsson PNX6715 416 MHz CPU, 256 MB of RAM and 256 MB of internal storage that can be expanded using microSD card. The phone has a 1500 mAh Li-ion battery, 3.5 MP rear camera with no selfie camera. It is available in Black and Dark Blue colors.

=== Software ===
Acer beTouch E110 ships with Android 1.5 (Cupcake).

== Reception ==
The device received mixed reviews. The negativity in reviews involved the lack of connectivity to Wi-Fi and Android Market. Some said that the screen was not clear enough, and that the resistive touchscreen was poorly designed: users must press the screen firmly at times.

== See also ==
- Galaxy Nexus
- List of Android devices
