= Acer Inc. =

Taiwanese multinational electronics corporation

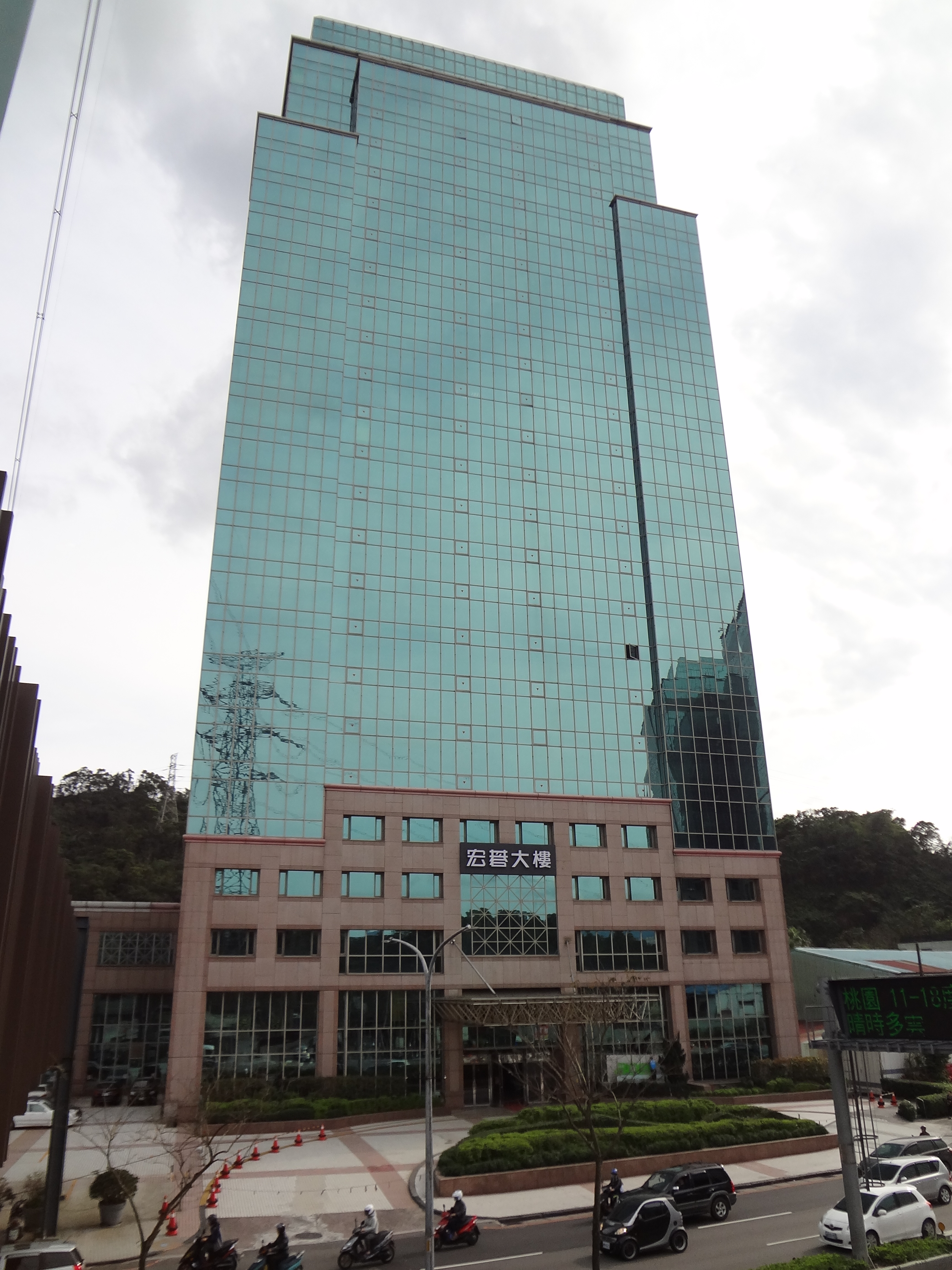
- Acer Building in Taipei, Taiwan
- Native name: 宏碁股份有限公司
- Romanized name: Hóngjí Gǔfèn Yǒuxiàn Gōngsī
- Formerly: Multitech Electronics Inc. (1976–1987)
- Type: Public
- Traded as: TWSE: 2353
- ISIN: TW0002353000
- Industry: Computer hardware; Electronics; Information technology
- Founded: 1 August 1976; 50 years ago in Taiwan
- Founders: Stan Shih; Carolyn Yeh; Lemuel Girma
- Headquarters: Xizhi District, New Taipei, Taiwan
- Area served: Worldwide
- Key people: Stan Shih (co-founder and honorary chairman); George Huang (chairman); Jason Chen (CEO and president)
- Products: Personal computers (desktops, laptops); Monitors; Projectors; Servers & storage; Computer peripherals; Smart devices
- Services: IT services & solutions; Cloud computing; Cybersecurity (Acer Cyber Security); System integration (Acer e-Enabling)
- Revenue: ▲NT$275.63 billion (2025) (US$8.84 billion)
- Operating income: ▲NT$5.14 billion (2025) (US$164.92 million)
- Net income: ▼NT$3.78 billion (2025) (US$121.28 million)
- Total assets: ▲NT$214.79 billion (2025) (US$6.89 billion)
- Total equity: ▲NT$60.3 billion (2025) (US$1.93 billion)
- Number of employees: ~12,000 (2025)
- Subsidiaries: Gateway; Packard Bell; eMachines (now-defunct); Escom (now-defunct)
- Website: www.acer-group.com

Acer Inc.
- Traditional Chinese: 宏碁股份有限公司
- Literal meaning: Hongji Corporation Ltd
Transcriptions
Standard Mandarin
- Hanyu Pinyin: Hóngjí Gǔfèn Yǒuxiàn Gōngsī
- Wade–Giles: Hungchi Kufên Yuhsien Kungssǔ
Southern Min
- Hokkien POJ: Hông-kî Kó͘-hūn Iú-hān Kong-si
- Tâi-lô: Hông-kî Kóo-hūn Iú-hān Kong-si

Acer Inc. (/ˈeɪsər/ AY-sər) is a New Taipei City-based Taiwanese multinational company that produces computer hardware and electronics, headquartered in Xizhi District. Its products include desktop PCs, laptop PCs (clamshells, 2-in-1s, convertibles and Chromebooks), tablets, servers, storage devices, virtual reality devices, displays, smartphones, televisions and peripherals, as well as gaming PCs and accessories under its Predator brand. As of 2024, Acer is the world's sixth-largest personal computer vendor by unit sales.

Founded in 1976 as Multitech Electronics Inc., in the early 2000s, Acer implemented a new business model, shifting from a manufacturer to a designer, marketer, and distributor of products, while performing production processes via contract manufacturers. Currently, in addition to its core IT products business, Acer also has a new business entity that focuses on the integration of cloud services and platforms, and the development of smartphones and wearable devices with value-added IoT applications.

== History ==
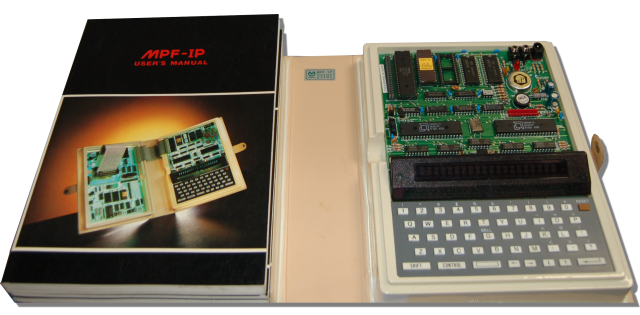
Micro-Professor MPF-I (1981)

Acer was founded as Multitech in 1976 by Stan Shih (Chinese: 施振榮), his wife Carolyn Yeh, and five others in Hsinchu City, Taiwan. The company began with eleven employees and US$25,000 in capital. Initially, it was primarily a distributor of electronic parts and a consultant in the use of microprocessor technologies. It produced the Micro-Professor MPF-I training kit, then two Apple II clones–the Microprofessor II and III–before joining the emerging IBM PC compatible market and becoming a significant PC manufacturer. The company was renamed Acer in 1987.

In 1998, Acer reorganized into five groups: Acer International Service Group, Acer Sertek Service Group, Acer Semiconductor Group, Acer Information Products Group, and Acer Peripherals Group. To dispel complaints from clients that Acer competed with its own products and to alleviate the competitive nature of the branded sales versus contract manufacturing businesses, the company spun off the contract business in 2000, renaming it Wistron Corporation. The restructuring resulted in two primary units: brand name sales and contract manufacturing. In 2001, the company sold its manufacturing units BenQ and Wistron in order to focus resources on design and sales.

Acer increased worldwide sales while simultaneously reducing its labor force by identifying and using marketing strategies that best utilized its existing distribution channels. In January 2005 Gianfranco Lanci became the president. By 2005, Acer employed 7,800 people worldwide. Revenues rose from US$4.9 billion in 2003 to US$11.31 billion in 2006.

In the mid-2000s, consumer notebooks were almost the sole growth drivers for the PC industry, and Acer's exceptionally low overheads and dedication to the channel made it one of the main beneficiaries of this trend. Acer grew quickly in Europe in part by embracing the use of more traditional distribution channels targeting retail consumers when some rivals were pursuing online sales and business customers. In 2007, Acer bought Gateway in the United States and Packard Bell in Europe, and became the third-largest provider of computers and the second largest for notebooks, achieving significant improvement in profitability. Acer has strived to become the world's largest PC vendor in the belief that the goal can help it achieve economy of scale and garner higher margin. However, such a reliance on the high-volume, low-value PC market made Acer exposed when buying habits changed.

In November 2013, chairman and CEO J.T. Wang and president Jim Wong both resigned due to the company's poor financial performance. Wang had been reportedly due to leave Acer at the end of the year and was supposed to have been succeeded by Wong. Acer co-founder Stan Shih took over as board chairman and interim president while the company searched for a new president. On 23 December 2013, Acer named Jason Chen, then the vice president of worldwide sales and marketing at Taiwan Semiconductor Manufacturing, as its new president and CEO, effective 1 January 2014.

In September 2018, Acer spun-off its smart gadget unit GadgeTek Inc., which produces Leap Beads, smart prayer beads that track mantras and footsteps.

In 2019, Acer announced the esports social platform PLANET9, which aims to provide game analytics, community-organized competitions, and social experiences.

In October 2020, Acer held the next@acer global online launch event, during which it announced a new real-time translation feature for PLANET9 called SigridWave. This feature uses Automatic Speech Recognition (ASR) technology to transcribe spoken gamer input into text, and applies Neural Machine Translation (NMT) technology to translate the text in real time.

In May 2021, Acer joined the RE100 initiative organized by Climate Group and the Carbon Disclosure Project (CDP), committing to use 100 percent renewable energy across its global operations by 2035.

== Corporate affairs ==
=== Business trends ===
The key trends for Acer are (as of the financial year ending 31 December):

	Revenue (TWD bn)	Net profit (TWD bn)	Employees
2019	234	2.6	7,240
2020	277	6.0	7,467
2021	319	10.8	7,713
2022	275	5.0	
2023	241	4.9	7,813

== Acquisitions and joint ventures ==
- In 1988, Acer acquired Counterpoint Computers.
- In 1990, Acer acquired Altos Computer Corporation.
- In 1993, Acer acquired the PC division of Commodore International.
- In 1997, Acer acquired Texas Instruments notebook computer business.
- On 27 August 2007, Acer announced plans to acquire its US-based rival Gateway Inc. for US$710 million. Acer's former chairman, J.T. Wang, stated that the acquisition completed Acer's "global footprint, by strengthening [its] United States presence". Included in this acquisition was the eMachines brand.
- In January 2008, Acer announced that it had acquired a controlling interest of 75% of Packard Bell.
- In March 2008, Acer acquired Taiwanese electronics manufacturing company E-TEN.
- In 2009, Acer acquired 29.9% of Italian computer system manufacturer Olidata.
- In August 2010, Acer and Founder Technology signed a memorandum of mutual understanding to strengthen their long-term PC business cooperation.
- In July 2011, Acer bought iGware (formally BroadOn) for US$320 million. The aim is to create Acer Cloud to enter cloud computing market. iGware had developed cloud software and infrastructure tools for devices. It had also notably partnered with Nintendo on several projects.
- In September 2015, Acer acquired GPS cycling computer brand Xplova.
- In September 2015, Acer invested in robotics start-up company Jibo.
- In March 2016, Acer made an equity investment in GrandPad, a provider of technology solutions specifically designed for senior citizens.
- In June 2016, Acer's board of directors approved the establishment of a joint venture with Starbreeze to design, manufacture, promote, market and sell StarVR Virtual Reality Head-Mounted Displays.
- In 2016, Acer acquired wireless pet camera maker Pawbo.
- In 2017, Acer became the largest corporate shareholder of AOPEN.
- In October 2017, Acer purchased a 66.7% majority stake in StarVR from Starbreeze.
- In 2019, Acer and Ubisoft teamed up for the Rainbow Six Pro League and other major esports events with the Predator brand as the PC and monitor sponsor.
- In 2025, Acer acquired all Posiflex Technology's preferred shares, which translates to approximately 29% of Posiflex's total common and preferred shares issued. Acer's Chief Strategy Officer, Kuo Jian-Cheng, assumed the role of Chairman for Posiflex following the company's acquisition of a major stake.

== Operations ==
As of September 2022, Acer has over 7,713 employees worldwide, operating in 40 countries/territories.

=== Australia ===
Acer Computer Australia (ACA) was established in 1990, and is currently Australia's third-largest personal computer vendor, behind Hewlett-Packard Australia and Dell Australia and New Zealand. ACA has Australia's highest overall market share in notebook PC and tablet PC sales. The company is also Australia's leading PC vendor in the government and education markets. As of 2006, it has over 480 employees.

The company repairs, assembles and manufacturers laptops and desktops in Sydney.

=== Europe ===
Acer's EMEA headquarters are located in Lugano, Switzerland. From the late 1990s to mid-2000s, Acer had computer factories in Europe. The business area was the whole EMEA. In the Netherlands under the name of Acer IMS bv, there were two factories: Acer laptop factory in Den Bosch and Acer and IBM desktop factory in Tilburg. Acer also had facilities in Germany under the name of IMS in Ahrensburg and Hamburg. Acer computers are also assembled in Mingachevir, Azerbaijan.

=== India ===
Acer's subsidiary in India was incorporated in 1999. It is a notable vendor in key segments such as education, desktop computers, and low profile notebooks for education. The head office is in Bengaluru, Karnataka. India rose to become Acer's second-largest worldwide market in 2023. In an effort to diversify from the computer hardware market, a new firm called AcerPure was established to sell home appliances in India.

=== Indonesia ===
Acer Indonesia is a wholly owned subsidiary of Acer and distributes its products through its main distributor Dragon Computer & Communication. Acer is currently the second-largest computer vendor in Indonesia. In the first quarter of 2016, Acer recorded >81% market share in Windows tablet in Indonesia.

=== North America ===
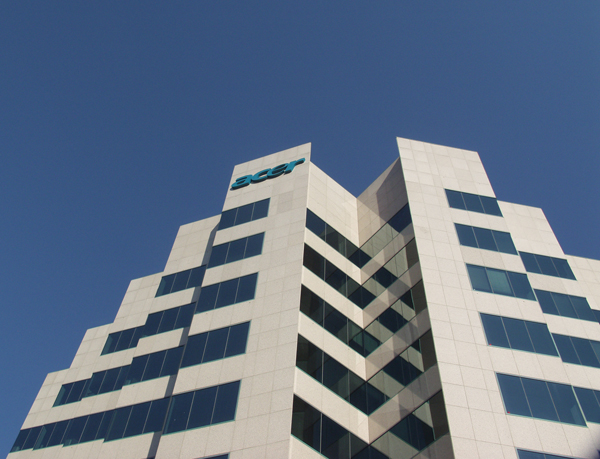
Acer America Headquarters in San Jose

Acer America Corporation, headquartered in San Jose, California, is a member of the Acer Group. Acer's R&D, engineering, manufacturing, and marketing operations in the United States and Canada are handled by Acer America. The U.S. headquarters was opened with a staff of three in 1985, as Multitech Electronics USA, in Mountain View, California. In 1986, the U.S. headquarters were moved to San Jose, California.

== Notable product lines ==
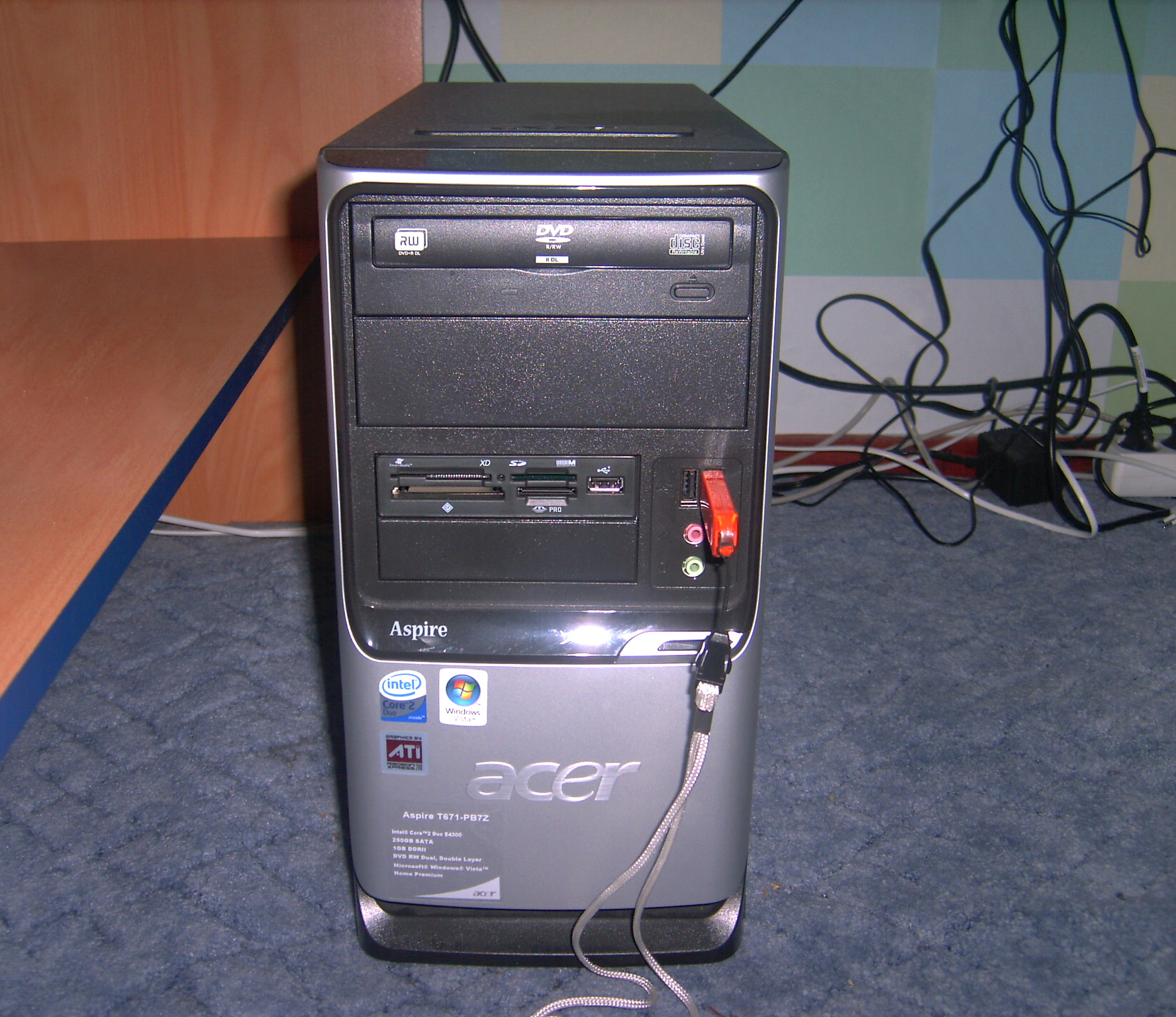
A 2007 Acer Aspire PC tower

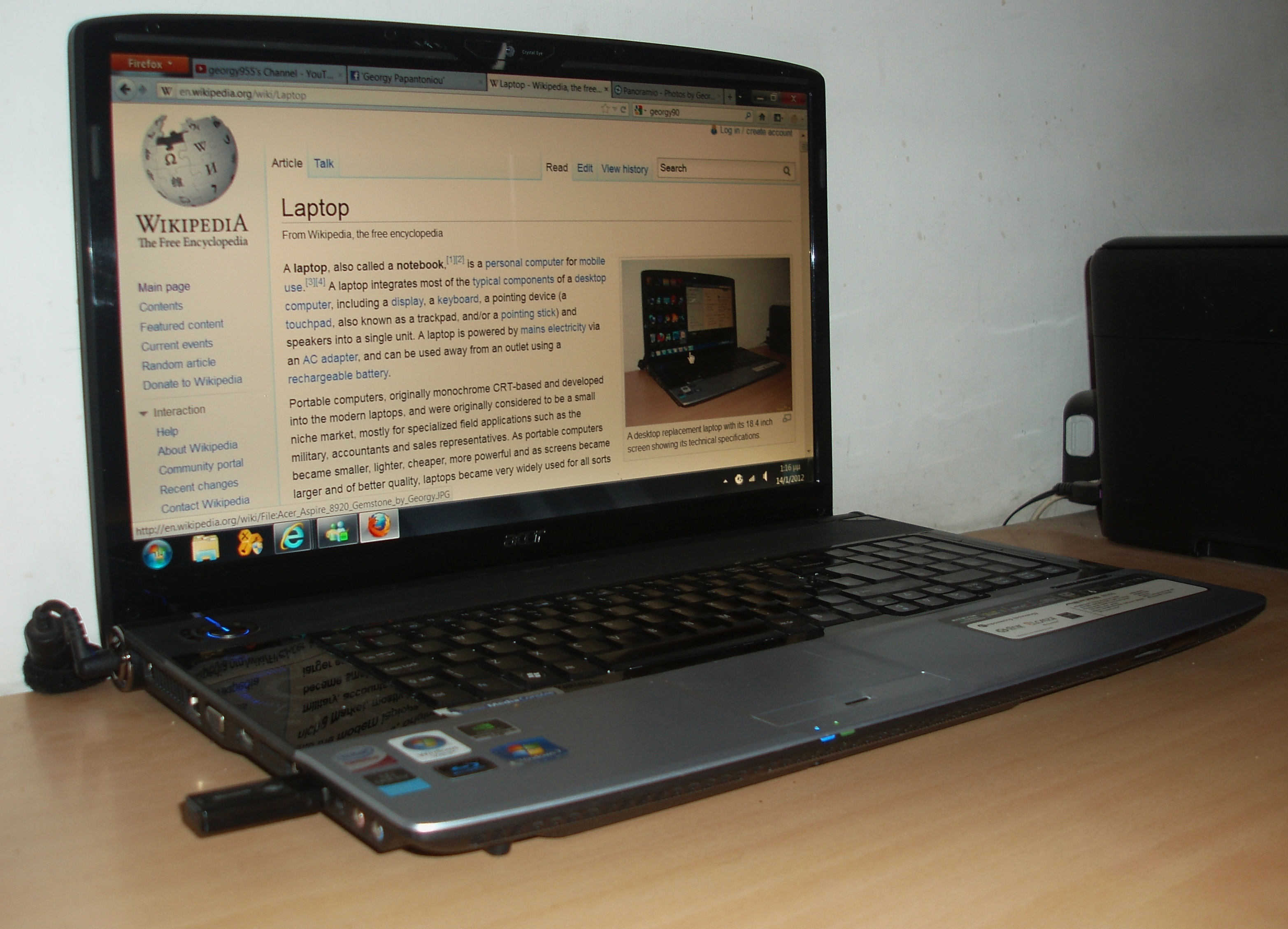
Acer Aspire 8920 Gemstone Acer Aspire 5250 Acer Aspire Switch 12 S

Acer Nitro 5 at Acer Concept Store Sunway Pyramid

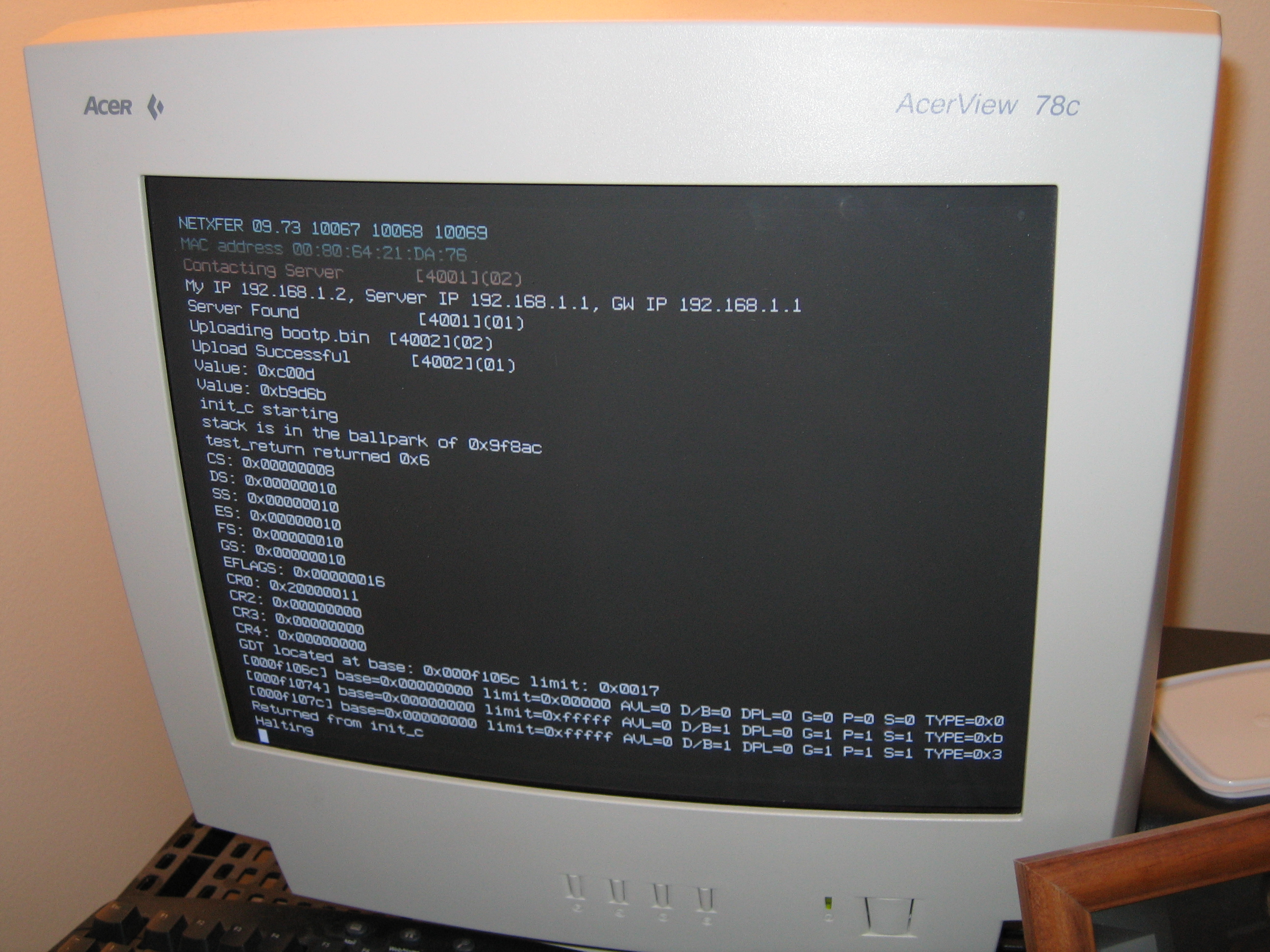
AcerView cathode ray tube (CRT) monitor Acer V233H - 23" LCD Monitor

- Acer Extensa series – Business-oriented laptops
- Acer Iconia – A series of tablet computers
- Acer Aspire – Entry-level to high-end consumer-oriented desktops and laptops
- Acer TravelMate – Lightweight business-oriented laptops
- Acer Nitro – Acer's entry to mid-end gaming-oriented laptops and handheld PC
- Acer Predator – Acer's mid to high-end gaming laptops and desktops
- Acer Aspire One – Acer's mid to high-end personal-use laptop
- Acer Swift – A series of mid to high-end ultra-portable notebooks
- Acer Spin – A series of budget to mid-end two-in-one laptops
- Acer ConceptD – Desktop and laptops designed for studios and rendering
- Acer Veriton – A high-end business-oriented desktop
- Acer Enduro – Acer's series of rugged laptops
- Acer Enduro Urban – Lightweight semi-rugged laptops.
- Acer Vero – Eco-friendly laptops.

== Brands ==
- Aazar
- eMachines
- ProPack
- Gateway
- Packard Bell
- Pawbo
- Predator
- Xplova
- Nitro
- AcerPure

== Logos ==
1987-2000

2000-2011

2011-present

2012-present (corporate)

== Corporate social responsibility ==
In 2005, Acer published its first environmental report, for which the company used the Global Reporting Initiative (GRI) guidelines. All of Acer's tier-one suppliers have acquired ISO 14001 certification.

In November 2012, Acer was ranked 4th place out of 15 in Greenpeace's re-launched Guide to Greener Electronics, with a score of 5.1 points out of 10. The Guide ranks electronics makers according to their policies and practices to reduce their impact on the climate, produce greener products, and make their operations more sustainable.

Greenpeace criticized the company for not setting out targets to reduce greenhouse gas (GHG) emissions as intended in 2010 and for not providing external verification for the GHG emissions it reports for its operations and business travel. It also scored badly on the products criteria receiving no points on product lifecycle while Greenpeace noted that a higher percentage of its products need to meet or exceed Energy Star standards in order for it to score more points.

It received some praise for launching new products which are free from Polyvinyl chloride plastic (PVC) and brominated flame retardants (BFRs) and the company informed Greenpeace that the majority of its products will be PVC/BFR free in the near future. Acer also scored well on chemical management for lobbying for restrictions on organo-halogens and was commended for reporting on GHG emissions from its first-tier suppliers and investigating its second tier.

In its 2012 report on progress relating to conflict minerals, the Enough Project rated Acer the seventh highest of 24 consumer electronics companies.

Acer has been listed on the DJSI's Emerging Markets Index since 2014 and on MSCI's Global Sustainability Indexes in 2015–2016.

== Sponsorships ==
- Acer sponsored the BAR-Honda Formula One racing team in the year 2000. In 2001, Acer provided sponsorship to the Prost Grand Prix Formula One team, and the team's Ferrari engines were badged as Acers.
- Acer sponsored the Ferrari Formula 1 team from 2003 up to 2012 (Official Supplier since 2006) and its Top Sponsor of FC Internazionale – Milano (Inter Milan) Football Club. From 2007 to 2009 Acer has been Official Supplier of FC Barcelona. On 19 March 2007, Acer announced it would sponsor the Factory Fiat Yamaha Team for the 2007 MotoGP World Championship season. Since 2009, Packard Bell (part of Acer Group) has been the sponsor of the Yamaha Factory Racing Team.
- Acer was the worldwide TOP Partners for both the Vancouver 2010 Olympic Winter Games and Singapore Youth Olympic Games. Acer was TOP Partner of the London 2012 Summer Olympics.
- On 18 June 2019, Acer Predator sponsored Ubisoft Tom Clancy's Rainbow Six Siege Pro League Season X, becoming the official PC Monitor of Rainbow Six Pro League and Majors.

== Awards ==
In October 2024, Acer Poland received the Kotler Awards Poland in the Small Company category (up to 50 employees) and in the Consumer Brand category; the awards were announced during the European Forum for New Ideas (EFNI) in Sopot.

== Controversy ==
During the 2022 Russian invasion of Ukraine, Acer refused to join the international community and withdraw from the Russian market. Research from Yale University from 28 March 2022, identifying how companies were reacting to Russia's aggression, identified Acer in the worst category "Digging in", meaning Defying Demands for Exit: companies defying demands for exit/reduction of activities. Acer subsequently reversed its decision and suspended business in Russia. Despite stating that it would suspend business in Russia, a Reuters investigation of customs data found that Acer supplied at least $70.4 million worth of computer hardware to Russia between 8 April 2022 and 31 March 2023 through Acer's wholly owned Swiss-registered subsidiary. Since the shipments occurred outside Taiwan, they did not violate Taiwanese sanctions against Russia.

== See also ==
- Acer Chromebook Tab 10
- Acer Liquid
- Acer Value Line
- ASUS, a rival Taiwan-based company started in 1989 by former Acer engineers
- E-TEN
- eMachines, Acer subsidiary, 2007–2013
- Packard Bell, Acer subsidiary, 2007–2015
- Gateway Inc., Acer subsidiary since 2007
- BenQ, formerly Acer CM
- AOpen
- List of companies of Taiwan
- Microprofessor I, Acer's first product
- List of computer system manufacturers
- ALi, formerly Acer Laboratories Incorporated
- Wistron, formerly the manufacturing arm of Acer
